= Asampurna Melakarta =

Musical system in Carnatic music

The Asampurna Melakarta (transliterated as Asaṃpūrṇa Mēḷakarta) scheme is the system of 72 ragas (musical scales) originally proposed in the 17th century by Venkatamakhin in his Chaturdanda Prakasikha. This proposal used scales with notes that do not conform to the sampurna raga system. Skipped notes or repeated notes, etc., were used in some of the ragas. Some of the ragas of any Melakarta system will use Vivadi swaras (discordant notes). The original system is supposed to avoid such ill-effects and was followed by the Muthuswami Dikshitar school. The naming of the original system followed Katapayadi system. Muthuswami Dikshitar's compositions use the name of these ragas in the lyrics of the songs and is still referred to by those names even in radio / TV announcements of these songs.

Later Govindacharya came up with a more mathematical and regular system of 72 ragas, which is currently considered fundamental ragas (musical scales) in Carnatic music (South Indian classical music). These melakarta ragas were sampurna ragas. Some of the names of the ragas had to be modified to fit into the Katapayadi system.

== Rules for Melakarta ==
In the Asampurna Melakarta system, there is no set rule for the ragas in contrast to the currently used system of Melakarta ragas. Some ragas though are the same in both systems (like 15 - Mayamalavagowla and 29 - Dheerasankarabharanam), and in some cases the scales are same, while names are different (like 8 - Janatodi and Hanumatodi, 56 - Chamaram and Shanmukhapriya).

== History ==
The mela system of ragas was first propounded by Raamamaatya in his work Svaramelakalanidhi c. 1550. He is considered the father of mela system of ragas. Later Venkatamakhin expounded in the 17th century in his work Caturdandi Prakaasikaa a new mela system known today as melakarta. He had made some bold and controversial claims and defined somewhat arbitrarily 6 swaras from the known 12 semitones, at that time, to arrive at 72 melakarta ragas. The controversial parts relate to double counting of R2 (and similar swaras) and his exclusive selection of madyamas for which there is no specific reasoning (also known as asampurna melas as opposed to sampurna ragas). However, today the 72 melakarta ragas use a standardized pattern, unlike Venkatamakhin's pattern, and have gained significant following. Govindhacharya is credited with standardization of rules and giving a different name for such standard ragas, which have different structure but same swaras as that proposed by Venkatamakhin. The scales in this page are those proposed by Govindhacharya.

== Chakras ==
The 72 melakarta ragas are split into 12 groups called chakras, each containing 6 ragas. The ragas within the chakra differ only in the dhaivatham and nishadham notes (D and N), as illustrated below. The name of each of the 12 chakras suggest their ordinal number as well.

- Indu stands for the moon, of which we have only one - hence it is the first chakra.
- Netra means eyes, of which we have two - hence it is the second.
- Agni is the third chakra as it denotes the three agnis or the holy fires (laukikaagni - earthly fire, daavaagni - lightning, and divyaagni - the Sun).
- Veda denoting four Vedas or scriptures namely Rigveda, Samaveda, Yajurveda, Atharvaveda is the name of the fourth chakra.
- Bana comes fifth as it stands for the five banas of Manmatha.
- Rutu is the sixth chakra standing for the 6 seasons of Hindu calendar.
- Rishi, meaning sage, is the seventh chakra representing the seven sages.
- Vasu stands for the eight vasus of Hinduism.
- Brahma comes next of which there are 9.
- The 10 directions, including akash (sky) and patal (nether region), is represented by the tenth chakra, Disi.
- Eleventh chakra is Rudra of which represents the eleven names of Lord Shiva.
- Twelfth comes Aditya of which stands for the twelve names of Lord Surya or the Sun God.

== Melakarta table ==
The 72 melakarta ragas can be divided into two parts: suddha Madhyamam and prati Madhyamam ragas. See Katapayadi sankhya for more information on how to derive the various swaras of a raga from its melakarta number. See swaras in Carnatic music for explanation of the notations like R1, G2, N2, etc.

'Shuddha Madhyamam ragas'
No.	Raga	Arohana	Avarohana	Sampurna raga equivalent
1. Indu Chakra
1	Kanakambari	S R₁ M₁ P D₁ Ṡ	Ṡ N₁ D₁ P M₁ G₁ R₁ S	Kanakangi
2	Phenadyuti	S R₁ M₁ P D₁ P N₂ Ṡ	Ṡ N₂ D₁ P M₁ G₁ R₁ S	Ratnangi
3	Ganasamavarali	S R₁ M₁ P D₁ N₃ Ṡ	Ṡ N₃ D₁ P M₁ G₁ R₁ S	Ganamurti
4	Bhanumati	S R₁ M₁ P D₂ N₂ Ṡ	Ṡ N₂ D₂ P M₁ G₁ R₁ S	Vanaspati
5	Manoranjani	S R₁ M₁ P D₂ N₃ Ṡ	Ṡ N₃ D₂ P M₁ G₁ R₁ S	Manavati
6	Tanukeerti	S R₁ M₁ P N₃ Ṡ	Ṡ N₃ D₃ N₃ P M₁ G₁ R₁ S	Tanarupi
2. Netra Chakra
7	Senagrani	S R₁ G₂ R₁ M₁ G₂ M₁ P N₁ D₁ Ṡ	Ṡ N₁ D₁ P M₁ G₂ M₁ G₂ R₁ S	Senavati
8	Janatodi	S R₁ G₂ M₁ P D₁ N₂ Ṡ	Ṡ N₂ D₁ M₁ P G₂ R₁ S	Hanumatodi
9	Dhunibhinnashadjam	S R₁ G₂ M₁ P D₁ N₃ Ṡ	Ṡ N₃ D₁ P M₁ G₂ R₁ S	Dhenuka
10	Natabharanam	S G₂ M₁ P N₂ D₂ N₂ Ṡ	Ṡ N₂ D₂ N₂ P N₂ P M₁ G₂ G₂ R₁ R₁ S	Natakapriya
11	Kokilaravam	S R₁ M₁ M₁ P M₁ P D₂ N₃ Ṡ	Ṡ N₃ D₂ D₂ P M₁ G₂ R₁ S	Kokilapriya
12	Rupavati	S R₁ M₁ P Ṡ Ṡ	Ṡ N₃ D₃ N₃ P M₁ G₂ S	Rupavati
3. Agni Chakra
13	Geyahejjujji	S R₁ M₁ G₃ M₁ P D₁ Ṡ	Ṡ N₁ D₁ P M₁ G₃ R₁ S	Gayakapriya
14	Vativasantabhairavi (Dhativasantabhairavi)	S R₁ G₃ M₁ P D₁ N₂ Ṡ	Ṡ N₂ D₁ M₁ G₃ M₁ P M₁ G₃ R₁ S	Vakulabharanam
15	Mayamalavagowla	S R₁ G₃ M₁ P D₁ N₃ Ṡ	Ṡ N₃ D₁ P M₁ G₃ R₁ S	Mayamalavagowla
16	Toyavegavahini	S R₁ G₃ M₁ P D₂ N₂ Ṡ	Ṡ N₂ D₂ P M₁ G₃ R₁ S	Chakravakam
17	Chayavati	S R₁ G₃ M₁ D₂ N₃ Ṡ	Ṡ N₃ D₂ P M₁ G₃ R₁ S	Suryakantam
18	Jayashuddhamalavi	S R₁ G₃ M₁ P N₃ Ṡ	Ṡ N₃ D₃ N₃ P M₁ G₃ R₁ S	Hatakambari
4. Veda Chakra
19	Jhankarabhramari	S R₂ G₂ M₁ P D₁ N₁ D₁ P D₁ Ṡ	Ṡ N₁ D₁ P M₁ G₂ R₂ G₂ R₂ S	Jhankaradhwani
20	Nariritigaula	S G₂ R₂ G₂ M₁ N₂ D₁ M₁ N₂ N₂ Ṡ	Ṡ N₂ D₁ M₁ G₂ M₁ P M₁ G₂ R₂ S	Natabhairavi
21	Kiranavali	S R₂ M₁ P D₁ P D₁ N₃ Ṡ	Ṡ N₃ P D₁ P M₁ P G₂ R₂ S	Keeravani
22	Sree	S R₂ M₁ P N₂ Ṡ	Ṡ N₂ P D₂ N₂ P M₁ R₂ G₂ R₂ S	Kharaharapriya
23	Gourivelavali	S R₂ G₂ S R₂ M₁ P D₂ Ṡ	Ṡ N₃ D₂ P M₁ G₂ R₂ S	Gourimanohari
24	Viravasantam	S R₂ M₁ P N₃ D₃ N₃ Ṡ	Ṡ N₃ P M₁ M₁ R₂ G₂ S	Varunapriya
5. Bana Chakra
25	Sharavati	S M₁ G₃ M₁ P D₁ N₁ D₁ Ṡ	Ṡ N₁ D₁ P M₁ G₃ R₂ S	Mararanjani
26	Tarangini	S R₂ G₃ P D₁ N₂ D₁ P D₁ Ṡ	Ṡ D₁ P G₃ R₂ S R₂ G₃ M₁ G₃ R₂ S	Charukesi
27	Sowrasena	S R₂ G₃ M₁ P D₁ N₃ Ṡ	Ṡ N₃ D₁ P M₁ G₃ R₂ G₃ S	Sarasangi
28	Harikedaragaula	S R₂ M₁ P N₂ Ṡ	Ṡ N₂ D₂ P M₁ G₃ R₂ S	Harikambhoji
29	Sankarabharanam	S R₂ G₃ M₁ P D₂ N₃ Ṡ	Ṡ N₃ D₂ P M₁ G₃ R₂ S	Sankarabharanam
30	Nagabharanam	S R₂ G₃ M₁ P N₃ D₃ N₃ Ṡ	Ṡ N₃ P M₁ G₃ M₁ R₂ S	Naganandini
6. Rutu Chakra
31	Kalavati	S R₃ G₃ M₁ P D₁ N₁ D₁ P D₁ Ṡ	Ṡ N₁ D₁ P M₁ R₃ G₃ M₁ R₃ S	Yagapriya
32	Ragachudamani	S M₁ R₃ G₃ M₁ P N₂ N₂ Ṡ	Ṡ N₂ D₁ P M₁ M₁ R₃ S	Ragavardhini
33	Gangatarangini	S R₃ G₃ M₁ P D₁ N₃ Ṡ	Ṡ N₃ P D₁ M₁ M₁ G₃ M₁ R₃ S	Gangeyabhushani
34	Bhogachayanata	S R₃ G₃ M₁ P N₂ N₂ Ṡ	Ṡ N₂ D₂ N₂ P Ṡ N₂ P M₁ R₃ S	Vagadheeswari
35	Shailadeshakshi	S M₁ G₃ P D₂ Ṡ	Ṡ N₃ D₂ S N₃ P M₁ R₃ S	Shulini
36	Chalanata	S R₃ G₃ M₁ P D₃ N₃ Ṡ	Ṡ N₃ P M₁ R₃ S	Chalanata
'Prati Madhyamam ragas'
7. Rishi Chakra
37	Saugandhini	S G₁ R₁ G₁ M₂ P D₁ Ṡ	Ṡ N₁ D₁ P M₂ G₁ R₁ S	Salagam
38	Jaganmohanam	S R₁ G₁ M₂ P D₁ N₂ Ṡ	Ṡ N₂ D₁ P M₂ G₁ R₁ S	Jalarnavam
39	Dhalivarali	S G₁ R₁ G₁ M₂ P D₁ N₃ Ṡ	Ṡ N₃ D₁ P M₂ G₁ R₁ S	Jhalavarali
40	Nabhomani	S G₁ R₁ M₂ P D₂ P N₂ Ṡ	Ṡ N₂ D₂ P M₂ G₁ R₁ S	Navaneetam
41	Kumbhini	S G₁ R₁ G₁ M₂ P N₃ D₂ N₃ Ṡ	Ṡ N₃ D₂ P M₂ G₁ R₁ S	Pavani
42	Ravikriya	S G₁ R₁ G₁ M₂ P N₃ D₃ N₃ Ṡ	Ṡ N₃ P M₂ G₁ R₁ S	Raghupriya
8. Vasu Chakra
43	Girvani	S R₁ G₂ M₂ P D₁ N₁ D₁ P D₁ Ṡ	Ṡ N₁ D₁ P M₂ G₂ R₁ S	Gavambhodi
44	Bhavani	S R₁ G₂ M₂ P D₁ P N₂ Ṡ	Ṡ N₂ D₁ P M₂ G₂ R₁ S	Bhavapriya
45	Shivapantuvarali	S R₁ G₂ M₂ P D₁ N₃ Ṡ	Ṡ N₃ D₁ P M₂ G₂ R₁ S	Shubhapantuvarali
46	Stavarajam	S R₁ M₂ P D₂ Ṡ	Ṡ N₂ D₂ P M₂ G₂ S	Shadvidamargini
47	Sauviram	S R₁ G₂ M₂ P D₂ N₃ Ṡ	Ṡ N₃ D₂ M₂ G₂ R₁ S	Suvarnangi
48	Jivantika	S R₁ G₂ M₂ P D₃ N₃ Ṡ	Ṡ N₃ P M₂ G₂ R₁ S	Divyamani
9. Brahma Chakra
49	Dhavalangam	S R₁ G₃ M₂ P D₁ Ṡ	Ṡ N₁ P M₂ G₃ R₁ S	Dhavalambari
50	Namadeshi	S R₁ G₃ M₂ P D₁ N₂ Ṡ	Ṡ N₂ D₁ P M₂ G₃ R₁ S	Namanarayani
51	Kashiramakriya	S G₃ R₁ G₃ M₂ P D₁ N₃ Ṡ	Ṡ N₃ D₁ P M₂ G₃ R₁ S	Kamavardani
52	Ramamanohari	S R₁ G₃ M₂ P D₂ N₂ Ṡ	Ṡ N₂ D₂ P M₂ G₃ R₁ S	Ramapriya
53	Gamakakriya	S R₁ G₃ M₂ P D₂ P Ṡ	Ṡ N₃ D₂ P M₂ G₃ R₁ S	Gamanashrama
54	Vamshavati	S R₁ G₃ M₂ P D₃ N₃ Ṡ	Ṡ N₃ P M₂ G₃ R₁ S	Vishwambari
10. Disi Chakra
55	Shamalam	S R₂ G₂ M₂ P D₁ Ṡ	Ṡ N₁ D₁ P M₂ G₂ R₂ S	Shamalangi
56	Chamaram	S R₂ G₂ M₂ P D₁ N₂ Ṡ	Ṡ N₂ D₁ P M₂ G₂ R₂ S	Shanmukhapriya
57	Sumadhyuti	S R₂ G₂ M₂ P D₁ N₃ Ṡ	Ṡ N₃ D₁ P M₂ G₂ R₂ S	Simhendramadhyamam
58	Deshisimharavam	S R₂ G₂ M₂ P D₂ N₂ Ṡ	Ṡ N₂ D₂ P M₂ G₂ R₂ S	Hemavati
59	Dhaamavati	S R₂ G₂ M₂ P D₂ N₃ Ṡ	Ṡ N₃ D₂ P M₂ G₂ R₂ S	Dharmavati
60	Nishadham	S R₂ G₂ M₂ P D₃ N₃ Ṡ	Ṡ N₃ P M₂ G₂ R₂ S	Neetimati
11. Rudra Chakra
61	Kuntalam	S R₂ G₃ M₂ P D₁ Ṡ	Ṡ N₁ D₁ P M₂ G₃ R₂ S	Kantamani
62	Ratipriya	S R₂ G₃ M₂ P D₁ N₂ Ṡ	Ṡ N₂ D₁ P M₂ G₃ R₂ S	Rishabhapriya
63	Gitapriya	S R₂ G₃ M₂ P D₁ N₃ Ṡ	Ṡ N₃ D₁ P M₂ G₃ R₂ S	Latangi
64	Bhushavati	S R₂ G₃ M₂ P D₂ N₂ Ṡ	Ṡ N₂ D₂ P M₂ G₃ R₂ S	Vachaspati
65	Shantakalyani	S R₂ G₃ M₂ P D₂ N₃ Ṡ	Ṡ N₃ D₂ P M₂ G₃ R₂ S	Mechakalyani
66	Chaturangini	S R₂ G₃ M₂ P D₃ N₃ Ṡ	Ṡ N₃ P M₂ G₃ R₂ S	Chitrambari
12. Aditya Chakra
67	Santanamanjari	S R₃ G₃ M₂ P D₁ Ṡ	Ṡ N₁ D₁ P M₂ R₃ S	Sucharitra
68	Joti	S R₃ G₃ M₂ P D₁ N₂ Ṡ	Ṡ N₂ D₁ P M₂ G₃ S	Jyoti swarupini
69	Dhautapanchamam	S R₃ G₃ M₂ P D₁ N₃ Ṡ	Ṡ N₃ D₁ P M₂ R₃ G₃ S	Dhatuvardani
70	Nasamani	S R₃ G₃ M₂ P D₂ N₂ Ṡ	Ṡ N₂ D₂ P M₂ R₃ G₃ S	Nasikabhushani
71	Kusumakaram	S R₃ G₃ M₂ P D₂ N₃ Ṡ	Ṡ N₃ D₂ P M₂ R₃ G₃ S	Kosalam
72	Rasamanjari	S R₃ G₃ S P M₂ P N₃ D₃ N₃ Ṡ	Ṡ N₃ D₃ N₃ P M₂ P R₃ G₃ S	Rasikapriya

== Popular Melakarta scheme ==
Govindacharya learnt the 72 ragas scheme above of Venkatamakin and later proposed the symmetrical scales that is more in vogue today in terms of the official Melakarta scheme.

== See also ==
- Melakarta
- Janya raga
- List of Janya Ragas
- Illustration of the notes in Melakarta ragas in a Keyboard layout at Wikimedia commons
- Katapayadi system
