= Graha bhedam =

Operation in Carnatic music

Graha Bhedam in Carnatic music is the process (or result of the process) of shifting the Tonic note (śruti) to another note in the rāgam and arriving at a different rāgam. Its equivalent in Hindustani classical music is called a murchhana. Expressed in Western music theory terms, this is the process of arriving at a different scale by shifting to another mode in the key, i.e., modulation.

Graha literally means position and Bhedam means change. Since the position of the śruti is changed (pitch of the base note or drone), it is also sometimes called Swara Bhedam or Śruti Bhedam though Śruti Bhedam and Graha Bhedam have some technical differences.

== Definition ==
Modal shift of the Tonic note to higher notes of a rāgam, while retaining the note's positions (swara sthānas – sthāna means position/ pitch), results in different rāgams. This is called Graha Bhedam.

=== Practical demo ===
A simple practical demonstration of Graha Bhedam can be taken up by playing the structure of a rāgam with the drone set to Sa (Shadjamam). Then if we keep playing the same keys/ notes, while shifting the drone to another note in the rāgam, to form the new śruti/ tonic note, the result is a different rāgam.

=== Example Illustration ===
When Graha bhedam is applied on Shankarabharanam's notes, it yields 5 other major Melakarta rāgams, namely, Kalyani, Hanumatodi, Natabhairavi, Kharaharapriya and Harikambhoji.

Rāgam	Mela #	Śruti Tonic	C	D	E	F	G	A	B	C	D	E	F	G	A	B	C
Shankarabharanam	29	C	S	R2	G3	M1	P	D2	N3	S'	R2'	G3'	M1'	P'	D2'	N3'	S' '
Karaharapriya	22	D		S	R2	G2	M1	P	D2	N2	S'						
Hanumatodi	08	E			S	R1	G2	M1	P	D1	N2	S'					
Kalyani	65	F				S	R2	G3	M2	P	D2	N3	S'				
Harikambhoji	28	G					S	R2	G3	M1	P	D2	N2	S'			
Natabhairavi	20	A						S	R2	G2	M1	P	D1	N2	S'		
Invalid Melakarta	–	B							S	R1	G2	M1	M2	D1	N2	S'	
Shankarabharanam	29	C	S	R2	G3	M1	P	D2	N3	S'	R2'	G3'	M1'	P'	D2'	N3'	S' '

Notes on above table

- C as the base for Shankarabharanam is chosen for above illustration only for convenience, as Carnatic music does not enforce strict frequency/pitch structure. The Shadjam (S) is fixed by the artist as per the vocal range or the instrument's tonic note. All the other swarams are relative to this Shadjam, falling into a Geometric progression-like frequency pattern. This note is applicable to all tables that are illustrated further below in this page.
- The 6th Graha Bhedam of Shankarabharanam has both Madhyamams (Ma) and no Panchamam (Pa) and hence will not be considered a valid Melakarta (ragam having all 7 swarams and only 1 of each). This is only a classification issue with respect to Melakarta, while this structure could be theoretically used well to create good music. Hindustani classical raga Lalit has 2 Ma and no Pa, however it has different Ga and Ni than this structure
- The gaps in the above table are for the missing swara positions in these ragams, which happens to be the Sharp / Flat notes in western music.
- The 6 Melakarta ragams in above table in graha bhedam are equivalent to the western Major Scale (Ionian mode) and it's 5 consequent modes with the exception of 7th mode (Locrian) as it doesn't correspond to any valid Melakarta ragam.

== Melakarta Rāgams ==
Graha Bhedam can be applied on most Melakarta rāgams to yield other Melakarta rāgams (16 of the 72 do not yield any valid Melakarta scale). When applying such modal shift of tonic note, some results are not valid Melakarta rāgams (rules of the definition of Melakarta are violated). Example scenarios are missing Panchamam (Pa) or two of particular note (Rishabham (Ri), Gandharam (Ga), Madhyamam (Ma), Dhaivatam (Da) or Nishadam (Ni)).

=== Shankarabharanam ===
See Example Illustration in previous section.

=== Kanakangi ===
The Graha Bhedam derivative of Kanakangi is Kamavardhini and vice versa.

Rāgam	Mela #	C		D	E	F	G		A	B	C		D
Kanakangi	01	S	R1	G1		M1	P	D1	N1		S'	R1'	G1'
Kamavardhini	51		S	R1		G3	M2	P	D1		N3	S'	

=== Mayamalavagowla ===
The Graha Bhedam derivatives of Mayamalavagowla are Rasikapriya and Simhendramadhyamam.

Rāgam	Mela #	C		D	E	F	G		A	B	C		D	E	F
Mayamalavagowla	15	S	R1		G3	M1	P	D1		N3	S'	R1'		G3'	M1'
Rasikapriya	72		S		R3	G3	M2	P		D3	N3	S'			
Simhendramadhyamam	57					S	R2	G2		M2	P	D1		N3	S'

=== Ragavardhini ===
The Graha Bhedam derivative of Ragavardhini is Varunapriya and vice versa.

Rāgam	Mela #	C	D		E	F	G		A		B	C	D		E	F
Ragavardhini	32	S		R3	G3	M1	P	D1		N2		S'		R3'	G3'	M1'
Varunapriya	24					S	R2	G2		M1		P		D3	N3	S'

=== Vachaspati ===
The Graha Bhedam derivatives of Vachaspati are Charukesi, Gourimanohari and Natakapriya.

Rāgam	Mela #	C	D	E	F		G	A		B	C	D	E	F		G	A
Vachaspati	64	S	R2	G3		M2	P	D2	N2		S'	R2'	G3'		M2'	P'	D2'
Charukesi	26		S	R2		G3	M1	P	D1		N2	S'					
Gourimanohari	23						S	R2	G2		M1	P	D2		N3	S'	
Natakapriya	10							S	R1		G2	M1	P		D2	N2	S'

=== Shanmukhapriya ===
The Graha Bhedam derivatives of Shanmukhapriya are Shoolini, Dhenuka and Chitrambari.

Rāgam	Mela #	C	D		E	F		G		A		B	C	D		E	F		G		A
Shanmukhapriya	56	S	R2	G2			M2	P	D1		N2		S'	R2'	G2'			M2'	P'	D1'	
Shoolini	35			S			R3	G3	M1		P		D2	N3	S'						
Dhenuka	09							S	R1		G2		M1	P	D1			N3	S'		
Chitrambari	66								S		R2		G3	M2	P			D3	N3	S'	

=== Keeravani ===
The Graha Bhedam derivatives of Keeravani are Hemavati, Vakulabharanam and Kosalam.

Rāgam	Mela #	C	D		E	F	G		A	B	C	D		E	F	G		A
Keeravani	21	S	R2	G2		M1	P	D1		N3	S'	R2'	G2'		M1'	P'	D1'	
Hemavati	58					S	R2	G2		M2	P	D2	N2		S'			
Vakulabharanam	14						S	R1		G3	M1	P	D1		N2	S'		
Kosalam	71							S		R3	G3	M2	P		D2	N3	S'	

=== Ratnangi ===
The Graha Bhedam derivatives of Ratnangi are Gamanashrama and Jhankaradhwani.

Rāgam	Mela #	C		D	E	F	G		A		B	C		D	E	F
Ratnangi	02	S	R1	G1		M1	P	D1		N2		S'	R1'	G1'		M1'
Gamanashrama	53		S	R1		G3	M2	P		D2		N3	S'			
Jhankaradhwani	19					S	R2	G2		M1		P	D1	N1		S'

=== Ganamurti ===
The Graha Bhedam derivatives of Ganamurti are Vishwambari and Shamalangi.

Rāgam	Mela #	C		D	E	F	G		A	B	C		D	E	F
Ganamurti	03	S	R1	G1		M1	P	D1		N3	S'	R1'	G1'		M1'
Vishwambari	54		S	R1		G3	M2	P		D3	N3	S'			
Shamalangi	55					S	R2	G2		M2	P	D1	N1		S'

=== Vanaspati ===
The Graha Bhedam derivative of Vanaspati is Mararanjani and vice versa.

Rāgam	Mela #	C		D	E	F	G	A		B	C		D	E	F
Vanaspati	04	S	R1	G1		M1	P	D2	N2		S'	R1'	G1'		M1'
Mararanjani	25					S	R2	G3	M1		P	D1	N1		S'

=== Manavati ===
The Graha Bhedam derivative of Manavati is Kantamani and vice versa.

Rāgam	Mela #	C		D	E	F	G	A	B	C		D	E	F
Manavati	05	S	R1	G1		M1	P	D2	N3	S'	R1'	G1'		M1'
Kantamani	61					S	R2	G3	M2	P	D1	N1		S'

=== Sooryakantam ===
The Graha Bhedam derivatives of Sooryakantam are Senavati and Latangi.

Rāgam	Mela #	C		D	E	F	G	A	B	C		D	E	F
Sooryakantam	17	S	R1		G3	M1	P	D2	N3	S'	R1'		G3'	M1'
Senavati	07				S	R1	G2	M1	P	D1	N1		S'	
Latangi	63					S	R2	G3	M2	P	D1		N3	S'

=== Kokilapriya ===
The Graha Bhedam derivative of Kokilapriya is Rishabhapriya and vice versa.

Rāgam	Mela #	C		D		E	F	G	A	B	C		D		E	F
Kokilapriya	11	S	R1		G2		M1	P	D2	N3	S'	R1'		G2'		M1'
Rishabhapriya	62						S	R2	G3	M2	P	D1		N2		S'

=== Gayakapriya ===
The Graha Bhedam derivative of Gayakapriya is Dhatuvardani and vice versa.

Rāgam	Mela #	C		D	E	F	G		A	B	C		D
Gayakapriya	13	S	R1		G3	M1	P	D1	N1		S'	R1'	
Dhatuvardani	69		S		R3	G3	M2	P	D1		N3	S'	

=== Dharmavati ===
The Graha Bhedam derivatives of Dharmavati are Chakravakam and Sarasangi.

Rāgam	Mela #	C	D		E	F		G	A	B	C	D		E	F		G
Dharmavati	59	S	R2	G2			M2	P	D2	N3	S'	R2'	G2'			M2'	P'
Chakravakam	16		S	R1			G3	M1	P	D2	N2	S'					
Sarasangi	27							S	R2	G3	M1	P	D1			N3	S'

=== Hatakambari ===
The Graha Bhedam derivative of Hatakambari is Gavambhodi and vice versa.

Rāgam	Mela #	C		D	E	F	G	A		B	C		D	E	F
Hatakambari	18	S	R1		G3	M1	P		D3	N3	S'	R1'		G3'	M1'
Gavambhodi	43				S	R1	G2		M2	P	D1	N1		S'	

=== Naganandini ===
The graha bhedam derivatives of Naganandini are Bhavapriya and Vagadheeshwari.

Rāgam	Mela #	C	D	E	F	G	A		B	C	D	E	F	G
Naganandini	30	S	R2	G3	M1	P		D3	N3	S'	R2'	G3'	M1'	P'
Bhavapriya	44			S	R1	G2		M2	P	D1	N2	S'		
Vagadheeshwari	34					S		R3	G3	M1	P	D2	N2	S'

=== Gangeyabhooshani ===
The graha bhedam derivative of Gangeyabhooshani is Neetimati and vice versa.

Rāgam	Mela #	C	D		E	F	G		A	B	C	D		E	F
Gangeyabhooshani	33	S		R3	G3	M1	P	D1		N3	S'		R3'	G3'	M1'
Neetimati	60					S	R2	G2		M2	P		D3	N3	S'

=== Chalanata ===
The graha bhedam derivative of Chalanata is Shubhapantuvarali and vice versa.

Rāgam	Mela #	C	D		E	F	G	A		B	C	D		E
Chalanata	36	S		R3	G3	M1	P		D3	N3	S'		R3'	G3'
Shubhapantuvarali	45				S	R1	G2		M2	P	D1		N3	S'

=== Shadvidamargini ===
The graha bhedam derivative of Shadvidamargini is Nasikabhooshani and vice versa.

Rāgam	Mela #	C		D		E	F		G	A		B	C		D		E
Shadvidamargini	46	S	R1		G2			M2	P	D2	N2		S'	R1'		G2'	
Nasikabhooshani	70				S			R3	G3	M2	P		D2	N2		S'	

== Janya rāgams ==
Graha bhedam can be applied to some of the janya rāgams to yield other janya rāgams. Unlike Melakarta rāgams, where strict rules are adhered to, in terms of which swaras can be chosen in a rāgam, janya rāgams do not have such rules. Hence, such modal shift of tonic note is valid on all swaras, but may not have been chosen as a rāgam, experimented with, elaborated and composed with. Hence they lead to theoretical rāgams, which have not yet been discovered (all combinations of notes exist, but one may never have been used or exposed to the world at large).

=== Mohanam ===
Mohanam rāgam and its graha bhedam derivatives are one of the key scales in use all over the world, especially East and South Asia. The other four derivatives are Hindolam, Shuddha Saveri, Shuddha Dhanyasi and Madhyamavathi.

Rāgam	Śruti Tonic	C	D	E	F	G	A	B	C	D	E	F	G	A	B	C
Mohanam	C	S	R2	G3		P	D2		S'	R2'	G3'		P'	D2'		S' '
Madhyamavati	D		S	R2		M1	P		N2	S'						
Hindolam	E			S		G2	M1		D1	N2	S'					
Shuddha Saveri	G					S	R2		M1	P	D2		S'			
Shuddha Dhanyasi	A						S		G2	M1	P		N2	S'		
Mohanam	C								S	R2	G3		P	D2		S'

Notes on above table

- C as the base for Mohanam is chosen for above illustration only for convenience, as Carnatic music does not enforce strict frequency/note structure. The Shadjam (S) is fixed by the artist as per the vocal range or the instrument's tonic note. All the other swarams are relative to this Shadjam, falling into a Geometric progression-like frequency pattern. This note is applicable to all tables that are illustrated further below.
- The gaps in the above table are for the missing swara positions in these ragams, which happens to be the Sharp and Flat notes along with F and B notes, in western music.
- If a Sharp / Flat key is chosen as tonic note and ONLY the black keys are played in a piano/ organ/ keyboard/ harmonium, then these 5 are the ragams played successively. That is if you have only black keys, with tonic note from C#, it is Shuddha Saveri. From D# it is Udayaravichandrika, from F# it is Mohanam, from A-flat it is Madhyamavathi and from B-Flat it is Hindolam.
- This statement is true for simplified ragam structure only. Ragams though are more complex in that there are phrases to use and phrases to avoid, gamakas, elongation of notes, a specific mood/ bhava/ rasa to be evoked while singing/ playing, etc. These cannot be captured well in scientific notations.

=== Shivaranjani ===
Shivaranjani rāgam and its Graha Bhedam derivatives are Revati and Sunadavinodini.

Rāgam	Śruti Tonic	C	D		E	F	G	A	B	C	D	
Shivaranjani	C	S	R2	G2			P	D2		S'	R2'	G2'
Revati	D		S	R1			M1	P		N2	S'	
Sunadavinodini	D#			S			G3	M2		D2	N3	S'

Notes on above table

- The difference between this set and Mohanam set shown above it, is that the 3rd note differs between E and D# (reference note purpose only). Hence, Shivaranjani differs from Mohanam by one note – G2 in place of G3, Revati differs from Madhyamavati by one note – R1 in place of R2, while Sunadavinodini differs from Hindolam in all notes other than S (as that step is equivalent of shifting down tonic note, Sa, by one note while retaining all other notes of Hindolam).

=== Hamsadhwani ===
Hamsadhwani rāgam and its graha bhedam derivative is Nagasvaravali.

Rāgam	Śruti Tonic	C	D	E	F	G	A	B	C	D	E	F	G
Hamsadhwani	C	S	R2	G3		P		N3	S'	R2'	G3'		P'
Nagasvaravali	G					S		G3	M1	P	D2		S'

=== Abhogi ===
Abhogi rāgam and its graha bhedam derivative is Valaji.

Rāgam	Śruti Tonic	C	D		E	F	G	A	B	C	D		E	F
Abhogi	C	S	R2	G2		M1		D2		S'	R2'	G2'		M1'
Kalāsāveri	D		S	R1		G2		P		N2	S'	R1'		G2'
Valaji	F					S		G3		P	D2	N2		S'

=== Amritavarshini ===
Amritavarshini rāgam and its graha bhedam derivative is Karnataka Shuddha Saveri.

Rāgam	Śruti Tonic	C		D	E	F	G		A	B	C		D	E	F
Karnataka Shuddha Saveri	C	S	R1			M1	P	D1			S'	R1'			M1'
Amritavarshini	C#		S			G3	M2	P			N3	S'			G3'

=== Gambhiranata ===
Gambhiranata rāgam and its graha bhedam derivative is Bhupalam.

Rāgam	Śruti Tonic	C	D	E	F	G	A	B	C	D	E	F
Gambhiranata	C	S		G3	M1	P		N3	S'		G3'	M1'
Bhupalam	E			S	R1	G2		P	D1		S1	R1'
Hamsanadam	F				S	R2		M2	P		N3	S

== See also ==
- Melakarta
