= Shivaranjani =

Janya raga of Carnatic music, also used in Hindustani classical music

- Thaat: Kafi
- Arohana: S R g P D Ṡ
- Avarohana: Ṡ D P g R S

Shivaranjani or Sivaranjani is a musical scale used in Indian classical music. There are two scales, one in Hindustani music and one in Carnatic music. The Hindustani rāga is a pentatonic scale, as is the Carnatic scale categorized as Audava-Audava (audava meaning 'of 5') resulting in 5 notes in the Arohanam and 5 in the Avarohanam.

== Hindustani scale ==
The Hindustani rāga Shivaranjani belongs to the Kaafi thaat in terms of classification of the scale. Its structure is as follows:

- ārohaṇa : S R g P D Ṡ (Note: Alternate notations: Carnatic: S R₂ D₂ Ṡ; Western: C D A C)
- avarohaṇa : Ṡ D P g R S (Note: Alternate notations: Carnatic: Ṡ D₂ P S; Western: C A G C)

The komal(soft) gandhar(g) in place of shuddh gandhar (G) is the difference between this rāga and the global musical scale of Bhoop/Bhupali (Mohanam in Carnatic).

=== Borrowed into Carnatic music ===
Shivaranjani scale with shadjam at C

In Karnatic Music, this is a janya rāga (derived scale) from 22nd mela-kartha raga Kharaharapriya. It is a audava-audava rāgam in Carnatic music classification (i.e., a ragam that has five notes in both its arohana and avarohana). Its ārohaṇa-avarohaṇa structure (ascending and descending scale) using swaras in Carnatic music notation is as follows:

- ārohaṇa : S R₂ G₂ P D₂ Ṡ (Note: Alternate notations: Hindustani: S R G̱ P D Ṡ; Western: C D E♭ G A C)
- avarohaṇa : Ṡ D₂ P G₂ R₂ S (Note: Alternate notations: Hindustani: Ṡ D P G̱ R S; Western: C A G E♭ D C)

(the variant notes used in this scale are chathusruthi rishabham, sadharana gandharam, chathusruthi dhaivatham other than the invariants shadjam and panchamam)

=== Popular compositions ===
- The opening stanza of Kurai ondrum illai based on lyrics of Rajaji
- Andavan Ambe composed by Papanasam Sivan
- Antaryami Alasithi Solasithi - popular rendering of Annamacharya's krithi.
- Yamanelli Kanenendu, Aluvudyatako Rangayya - popular renderings of Purandara Dasa's krithis.
- Va Velava composed by M D Ramanathan
- The traditional Marathi Abhang - Majhi Dev Puja too has a popularized version of it, in this raga.

== Film songs ==
=== Tamil ===
Year	Song	Movie	Composer	Singer
1943	"Soppana Vaazhvil"	Sivakavi	Papanasam Sivan	M. K. Thyagaraja Bhagavathar
1966	"Kaalathil Azhiyaatha"	Mahakavi Kalidas	K. V. Mahadevan	K. B. Sundarambal
1973	"Muthukku Muthaga"	Anbu Sagodharargal	K. V. Mahadevan	Ghantasala
1963	"Idayaveenai Thongum Pothu"	Iruvar Ullam	K. V. Mahadevan	P. Susheela
1972	"Kalaimagal Kai Porule"	Vasantha Maligai	K. V. Mahadevan	P. Susheela
1968	"Nalandhana" (Nilamani Ragam similar)	Thillana Mohanambal	K. V. Mahadevan	P. Susheela
1971	"Varugavae Varugavae"	Aathi Parasakthi	K. V. Mahadevan	P. Susheela
1963	"Saravana Poikaiyil"	Idhu Sathiyam	Viswanathan–Ramamoorthy	P. Susheela
1961	"Naan Pesa Ninaippathellam"	Palum Pazhamum	Viswanathan–Ramamoorthy	P. Susheela, T. M. Soundararajan
1963	"Neerodum Vaikaiyile"	Paar Magaley Paar	Viswanathan–Ramamoorthy	P. Susheela, T. M. Soundararajan
1968	"Aandavane Un"	Oli Vilakku	M. S. Viswanathan	P. Susheela
1965	"Enna Vegam Nillu"	Kuzhandaiyum Deivamum	M. S. Viswanathan	T. M. Soundararajan, A. L. Raghavan
1970	"Ellorum Nalam Vaazha"	Enga Mama	M. S. Viswanathan	T. M. Soundararajan
1977	"Thangathil Mugameduthu"	Meenava Nanban	M. S. Viswanathan	K.J. Yesudas, Vani Jairam
1984	"Naan Paadikkonde Iruppen" (pathos)	Sirai	M. S. Viswanathan	Vani Jairam
1985	"Uruguthey Idhayame"	Nooravathu Naal	Ilaiyaraaja	Vani Jairam
1988	"Vaa Vaa Anbe Anbe"	Agni Natchathiram	Ilaiyaraaja	K.J. Yesudas, K.S. Chitra
1988	"Vanna Nilavey Vaigai" (Vijayanagari Ragam similar)	Paadatha Thenikkal	Ilaiyaraaja	K.J. Yesudas, K.S. Chitra
1984	"Solai Pushpangale"	Ingeyum Oru Gangai	Ilaiyaraaja	P. Susheela, Gangai Amaran
1984	"Unnaithane Thanjam Endru"	Nallavanukku Nallavan	Ilaiyaraaja	K.J. Yesudas, Manjula Gururaj
1985	"Ponmane Kovam Yeno"	Oru Kaidhiyin Diary	Ilaiyaraaja	Unni Menon, Uma Ramanan
1984	"Kaathirunthu Kaathirunthu"	Vaidehi Kathirunthal	Ilaiyaraaja	P. Jayachandran
1985	"Kanmaniye Paesu"	Kaakki Sattai	Ilaiyaraaja	S P Balasubramaniam, S Janaki
1987	"Pethu Eduthavathaan"	Velaikkaran	Ilaiyaraaja	Malaysia Vasudevan
1989	"Oh Priya Priya!"	Idhayathai Thirudathe	Ilaiyaraaja	Mano, K.S. Chitra
1989	"Kudagu Malai" (Vijayanagari ragam)	Karakattakkaran	Ilaiyaraaja	Mano, K.S. Chitra
1991	"Kuyil Paattu"	En Rasavin Manasile	Ilaiyaraaja	Swarnalatha, Ilaiyaraaja
1986	"Adi Aathadi"	Kadalora Kavithaigal	Ilaiyaraaja	Ilaiyaraaja, S. Janaki
1983	"Chinna Ponnu Selai"	Malaiyoor Mambattiyan	Ilaiyaraaja	Ilaiyaraaja, S. Janaki
1992	"Valli Valli Enna"	Deiva Vaakku	Ilaiyaraaja	Ilaiyaraaja, S. Janaki
1991	"Yaar Aluthu Yaar Thuyaram"	Kannukoru Vannakili	Ilaiyaraaja	K.J. Yesudas, Ilaiyaraaja
1988	"Yaarai Keattu"	En Uyir Kannamma	Ilaiyaraaja	K.S. Chitra
1988	"Adhikaalai Neram"	Naan Sonnathey Sattam	Ilaiyaraaja	S. P. Balasubrahmanyam, Asha Bhosle
1992	"Manikuyil Isaikkuthadi"	Thanga Manasukkaran	Ilaiyaraaja	Mano
1985	"Vaanuyarntha Solaiyile"	Idaya Kovil	Ilaiyaraaja	S. P. Balasubrahmanyam
1993	"Sindhu Nathi Seemane" (Vijayanagari Ragam)	Ponnumani	Ilaiyaraaja	S. P. Balasubrahmanyam
1993	"Anba Sumanthu"	Ponnumani	Ilaiyaraaja	S. P. Balasubrahmanyam
2001	"Aathorathile Aalamaram"	Kasi	Ilaiyaraaja	Hariharan
2002	"Paattu Solli Paada Solli"	Azhagi	Ilaiyaraaja	Sadhana Sargam (Won National Award)
1986	"Naan Pooveduthu"	Naanum Oru Thozhilali	Ilaiyaraaja	S. P. Balasubrahmanyam, S. Janaki
1986	"Oru Jeevanthan"	Naan Adimai Illai	Vijay Anand	S. P. Balasubrahmanyam, S. Janaki
1992	"Koovurakuyilu"	Solaiyamma	Deva	S. P. Balasubrahmanyam, S. Janaki
1992	"Ezhelu Jenma Bandham"	Therku Theru Machan	Deva	S. P. Balasubrahmanyam, S. Janaki
1994	Kannathil Kannam	Watchman Vadivel	Deva	S. P. Balasubrahmanyam, K. S. Chithra
2000	Pennkiliye Pennkiliye	Sandhitha Velai	Deva	P. Unnikrishnan, Sujatha Mohan
1979	"Poovannam"	Azhiyatha Kolangal	Salil Chowdhury	P. Jayachandran, P. Susheela
1993	"Kannum Kannum"	Thiruda Thiruda	A.R. Rahman	Mano
1996	"Thaneerai Kaadhalikum"	Mr. Romeo	A.R. Rahman	Sangeetha, Sajith
1999	"Anjathe Jeeva"	Jodi	A.R. Rahman	Sirkazhi G. Sivachidambaram, Swarnalatha
2019	"Dingu Dongu"	Sarvam Thaala Mayam	A.R. Rahman	Bamba Bakya, Anthony Daasan
1983	"Vaigai Karai Katre"	Uyirullavarai Usha	Vijaya T. Rajendar	K. J. Yesudas
1986	"Padi Azhaithen"	Rasigan Oru Rasigai	Raveendran	K. J. Yesudas
1986	"Yezhisai Geethame"	Rasigan Oru Rasigai	Raveendran	K. J. Yesudas
1998	"Marikolunthu Mulla Uruthuma"	En Aasai Rasathi	Dr. Chandilyan	K. J. Yesudas
1986	"Maamarathu Poo"	Oomai Vizhigal	Manoj Gyan	S. N. Surendar, B. S. Sasirekha
1988	"Sendhoora Poove"	Senthoora Poove	Manoj Gyan	S. P. Balasubrahmanyam, B. S. Sasirekha
1990	"Yaar Padalo & Pooncholaiyai"	Panthaya Kuthiraigal	Manoj Gyan	K. J. Yesudas, Malaysia Vasudevan
1989	"Sevaanam Pookalthoovum"	Chinna Mayil	Manoj Gyan	P. Jayachandran, K.S. Chitra
1994	"Kanna Devaloga"	Rojakkal Unakkaga	Manoj Gyan	S. P. Balasubrahmanyam, Swarnalatha
1991	"Masai Matham"	MGR Nagaril	S. Balakrishnan	S. P. Balasubrahmanyam, Swarnalatha
1990	"Pattu Onnu Paadattuma"	Pudhu Vasantham	S. A. Rajkumar	K. J. Yesudas (Ver 1), S. P. Balasubrahmanyam (Ver 2)
1996	"Anantham Anantham"	Poove Unakkaga	S. A. Rajkumar	P. Unnikrishnan, K.S. Chitra
1998	"Vanathu Nilaveduthu"	Simmarasi	S. A. Rajkumar	P. Unnikrishnan, Swarnalatha
2001	"Kalyana Vaanil"	Aanandham	S. A. Rajkumar	Unni Menon,Sujatha
1982	"Enai Thedum Megam"	Kannodu Kann	Shankar–Ganesh	S. P. Balasubrahmanyam, Vani Jairam
1988	"Moongililai Kaadugale"	Penmani Aval Kanmani	Shankar–Ganesh	S. P. Balasubrahmanyam, Vani Jairam
1988	"Nee Parkama Poriye"	Manaivi Oru Manthiri	Shankar–Ganesh	S. P. Balasubrahmanyam, Uma Ramanan
1989	"Sala Sala Yena"	Ponnu Pakka Poren	K. Bhagyaraj	S. P. Balasubrahmanyam, K. S. Chithra
1992	"Nenjil Kodiyaagam"	Chinna Chittu	Devendran	S. P. Balasubrahmanyam, K. S. Chithra
1991	Vellai Rojavea	Nanbargal	Babul Bose	Satheesh,K. S. Chithra
1991	Ennuyerea Ennuyerea	Nanbargal	Babul Bose	Satheesh,K. S. Chithra
2001	"Avaravar Vazhkaiyil"	Pandavar Bhoomi	Bharadwaj	Bharadwaj
2004	"Unakkena Iruppaen"	Kaadhal	Joshua Sridhar	Haricharan
2010	"Yedi Kallachi"	Thenmerku Paruvakaatru	N. R. Raghunanthan	Vijay Prakash, Shreya Ghoshal
2008	"Kurai Ondrum Illai"(Traditional)	Arai En 305-il Kadavul	Vidyasagar	Harini
2006	"Poo Meedhu"	Dishyum	Vijay Antony	Malgudi Subha
2010	"Ooradangum Samathiley"	Kalavani	S. S. Kumaran	Senthilvelan
2017	"Unkooda Pesathaane"	Rubaai	D. Imman	Shreya Ghoshal, Anthony Daasan
2019	"Sudalamada Saamikitta"	Pettikadai	Mariya Manohar	Shreya Ghoshal

=== Hindi ===
Year	Song	Movie	Composer	Singer
1976	"Mere Naina Sawan Bhado"	Mehbooba	R. D. Burman	Kishore Kumar
1978	"Tumhen Dekhti Hoon To"	Tumhare Liye	Jaidev	Lata Mangeshkar
1989	"Teri Payal Baji Jahan"	Bade Ghar Ki Beti	Lakshmikant-Pyarelal	Mohammed Aziz & Anuradha Paudwal
2006	"Tere Ishq Mein Pagal Ho Gaya"	Humko Tumse Pyaar Hai	Anand Raaj Anand	Udit Narayan, Sapna Awasthi & Alka Yagnik
2014	"Teri Mahima Aprampaar" (Loosely based)	Entertainment	Sachin-Jigar	Anushka Manchanda & Udit Narayan
2025	"Aawaara Angara" (loosely based)	Tere Ishq Mein	A. R. Rahman	Faheem Abdullah

=== Bengali ===
Year	Song	Movie	Composer	Singer
1977	"Asha chilo bhalobasa chilo"	Ānanda Āśram	Shyamal Mitra, Gauriprasanna Majumdaar	Kishore kumar

=== Related rāgams ===
This section covers the theoretical and scientific aspects of this rāgam.

==== Graha bhedam ====
Shivaranjani's notes when shifted using Graha bhedam, yields 2 other pentatonic rāgams, namely, Sunadavinodini and Revati. Graha bhedam is the step taken in keeping the relative note frequencies same, while shifting the shadjam to the next note in the rāgam. See Graha bhedam on Shivaranjani for more details and an illustration.

==== Scale similarities ====
- Mohanam alias Bhupali (in Hindustani) is a popular rāgam which has the antara gandharam in place of sadharana gandharam. Its ārohaṇa-avarohaṇa structure is S R2 G3 P D2 S : S D2 P G3 R2 S
- Pahadi, a folk raga, is technically a Cross-Breed of Mohanam and Shivaranjani, as it has both antara gandharam and sadharana gandharam. Antara gandharam in aarohana, and sadharana gandharam in avarohana.
- Abhogi is a popular rāgam which has the shuddha madhyamam in place of panchamam. Its ārohaṇa-avarohaṇa structure is S R2 G2 M1 D2 S : S D2 M1 G2 R2 S

== Carnatic scale ==
The Carnatic scale Shivaranjani is a janya rāgam (derived scale) associated with the 64th parent scale Vachaspati (melakarta). It has vakra prayoga (zig-zag notes in its scale and note phrases) and its scale is as follows.

- ārohaṇa : S R₂ G₃ M₂ D₂ P N₂ Ṡ (Note: Alternate notations: Hindustani: S R G M̄ D P Ṉ Ṡ; Western: C D E F♯ A G B♭ C)
- avarohaṇa : Ṡ N₂ D₂ P D₂ M₂ G₃ R₂ S (Note: Alternate notations: Hindustani: Ṡ Ṉ D P D M̄ G R S; Western: C B♭ A G A F♯ E D C)

=== Compositions ===
The compositions in this scale are:

- Andavan anbe and Tarunamidaya dayai composed by Papanasam Sivan
- Maha Tripura Sundari Varnam composed by Madurai R. Muralidaran
- The first stanza of Kurai Ondrum Illai composed by Chakravarti Rajagopalachari and popularized by M S Subbulakshmi

== See also ==
- Mohanam
- Bhopali
- Pahadi
- Durga
