= Malahari =

Janya raga of Carnatic music

- Arohanam: S R₁ M₁ P D₁ Ṡ
- Avarohanam: Ṡ D₁ P M₁ G₃ R₁ S

Malahari is a Carnatic raga. This raaga is a janya of the 15th Melakarta raga Mayamalavagowla. This raga is known to be a morning raga which brings out a sense of calmness. It is associated with the rainy season.

In classical carnatic training, it is often used as a raaga for beginners using geetha right after the swara-based exercises in Mayamalavagowla. Many of the Geethas in this raga have been composed by Purandara Dasa.

Ascending scale with C as Shadjam (tonic note)

== Structure and Lakshana ==
Descending scale has one extra note G3

This raga is an asymmetric scale and is classified as an audava-shadava raga (five notes in the ascending scale and six notes in the descending scale).

- ārohaṇa: S R₁ M₁ P D₁ Ṡ (Note: Alternate notations: Hindustani: S Ṟ M P Ḏ Ṡ; Western: C D♭ F G A♭ C)
- avarohaṇa: Ṡ D₁ P M₁ G₃ R₁ S (Note: Alternate notations: Hindustani: Ṡ Ḏ P M G Ṟ S; Western: C A♭ G F E D♭ C)

The notes in this scale are shuddha rishabha, shuddha madhyama, shuddha dhaivata in arohana and additional antara gandhara in avarohana. Since this scale does not have a nishadha, it can be derived from Gayakapriya (13th melakarta) or Vakulabharanam (14th) too, but has been traditionally associated with Mayamalavagowla (15th) as the parent.
