= Raghupriya =

42nd raga in the Melakarta

- Arohanam: S R₁ G₁ M₂ P D₃ N₃ Ṡ
- Avarohanam: Ṡ N₃ D₃ P M₂ G₁ R₁ S

Raghupriya (meaning The one dear to Raghu) is a ragam in Carnatic music (musical scale of South Indian classical music). It is the 42nd melakarta rāgam (parent scale) in the 72 melakarta rāgam system of Carnatic music. It is called Ravikriya in Muthuswami Dikshitar school of Carnatic music.

== Structure and Lakshana ==
Raghupriya scale with shadjam at C

It is the 6th rāgam in the 7th chakra Rishi. The mnemonic name is Rishi-Sha. The mnemonic phrase is sa ra ga mi pa dhu nu. Its ārohaṇa-avarohaṇa structure (ascending and descending scale) is as follows (see swaras in Carnatic music for details on below notation and terms):

- ārohaṇa: S R₁ G₁ M₂ P D₃ N₃ Ṡ (Note: Alternate notations: Hindustani: S Ṟ R M̄ P Ṉ N Ṡ; Western: C D♭ E F♯ G A♯ B C)
- avarohaṇa: Ṡ N₃ D₃ P M₂ G₁ R₁ S (Note: Alternate notations: Hindustani: Ṡ N Ṉ P M̄ R Ṟ S; Western: C B A♯ G F♯ E D♭ C)

(the notes shuddha rishabham, shuddha gandharam, prati madhyamam, shatsruthi dhaivatham, kakali nishadham are used in this scale)

As it is a melakarta rāgam, by definition it is a sampoorna rāgam (has all seven notes in ascending and descending scale). It is the prati madhyamam equivalent of Tanaroopi, which is the 6th melakarta scale.
