= Sunadavinodini =

Janya raga of Carnatic music

- Arohanam: S G₃ M₂ D₂ N₃ Ṡ
- Avarohanam: Ṡ N₃ D₂ M₂ G₃ S

Sunadavinodini is a rāgam in Carnatic music (musical scale of South Indian classical music). It is an audava rāgam (or owdava rāgam, meaning pentatonic scale). It is a janya rāgam (derived scale), as it does not have all the seven swaras (musical notes). This raga was discovered by Mysore Vasudevachar.

== Structure and Lakshana ==
Sunadavinodini scale with shadjam at C

Sunadavinodini is a symmetric rāgam that does not contain rishabham and panchamam. It is a pentatonic scale (audava-audava ragam in Carnatic music classification – audava meaning 'of 5'). Its ārohaṇa-avarohaṇa structure (ascending and descending scale) is as follows (see swaras in Carnatic music for details on below notation and terms):

- ārohaṇa : S G₃ M₂ D₂ N₃ Ṡ (Note: Alternate notations: Hindustani: S G M̄ D N Ṡ; Western: C E F♯ A B C)
- avarohaṇa : Ṡ N₃ D₂ M₂ G₃ S (Note: Alternate notations: Hindustani: Ṡ N D M̄ G S; Western: C B A F♯ E C)

(notes used in this scale are antara gandharam, prati madhyamam, chathusruthi dhaivatham, kakali nishadham)

Sunadavinodini is considered a janya rāgam of Gamanashrama, the 53rd Melakarta rāgam, though it can be derived from two other melakarta rāgams, Kalyani or Kosalam, by dropping both rishabham and panchamam.
