= Rupavati =

Twelfth raga in the Melakarta

- Arohanam: S R₁ G₂ M₁ P D₃ N₃ Ṡ
- Avarohanam: Ṡ N₃ D₃ P M₁ G₂ R₁ S

Rupavati (pronounced rūpavati, meaning the beautiful one) is a rāgam in Carnatic music (musical scale of South Indian classical music). It is the 12th melakarta rāgam (parent scale) in the 72 melakarta rāgam system of Carnatic music. It is one of the few rāgams given the same name by the Muthuswami Dikshitar school of Carnatic music.

== Structure and Lakshana ==
Rupavati scale with shadjam at C

It is the 6th rāgam in the 2nd chakra Netra. The mnemonic name is Netra-Sha. The mnemonic phrase is sa ra gi ma pa dhu nu. Its ārohaṇa-avarohaṇa structure (ascending and descending scale) is as follows (see swaras in Carnatic music for details on below notation and terms):

- ārohaṇa: S R₁ G₂ M₁ P D₃ N₃ Ṡ (Note: Alternate notations: Hindustani: S Ṟ G̱ M P Ṉ N Ṡ; Western: C D♭ E♭ F G A♯ B C)
- avarohaṇa: Ṡ N₃ D₃ P M₁ G₂ R₁ S (Note: Alternate notations: Hindustani: Ṡ N Ṉ P M G̱ Ṟ S; Western: C B A♯ G F E♭ D♭ C)

The notes used in this scale are shuddha rishabham, sadharana gandharam, shuddha madhyamam, shatsruthi dhaivatham and kakali nishadham. As it is a melakarta rāgam, by definition it is a sampurna rāgam (has all seven notes in ascending and descending scale). It is the shuddha madhyamam equivalent of Divyamani, which is the 48th melakarta scale.

== Asampurna Melakarta ==
Rupavati is also the original name given to the 12th Melakarta in the list compiled by Venkatamakhin. The notes used in the scale are the same, but the scales are svarantara-shadava raga (4 notes in ascending scale and 6 are used in descending scale).

- ārohaṇa: S R₁ M₁ P Ṡ Ṡ (Note: Alternate notations: Hindustani: S Ṟ M P Ṡ Ṡ; Western: C D♭ F G C C)
- avarohaṇa: Ṡ N₃ D₃ N₃ P M₁ G₂ S (Note: Alternate notations: Hindustani: Ṡ N Ṉ N P M G̱ S; Western: C B A♯ B G F E♭ C)
