= Pavani (raga) =

41st raga in the Melakarta

- Arohanam: S R₁ G₁ M₂ P D₂ N₃ Ṡ
- Avarohanam: Ṡ N₃ D₂ P M₂ G₁ R₁ S

Pavani (pronounced pāvani, meaning the purifier) is a rāgam in Carnatic music (musical scale of South Indian classical music). It is the 41st melakarta rāgam in the 72 melakarta rāgam system of Carnatic music. It is called Kumbhini in Muthuswami Dikshitar school of Carnatic music.

== Structure and Lakshana ==
Pavani scale with shadjam at C

It is the 5th rāgam in the 7th chakra Rishi. The mnemonic name is Rishi-Ma. The mnemonic phrase is sa ra ga mi pa dhi nu. Its ārohaṇa-avarohaṇa structure is as follows (see swaras in Carnatic music for details on below notation and terms):

- ārohaṇa: S R₁ G₁ M₂ P D₂ N₃ Ṡ (Note: Alternate notations: Hindustani: S Ṟ R M̄ P D N Ṡ; Western: C D♭ E F♯ G A B C)
- avarohaṇa: Ṡ N₃ D₂ P M₂ G₁ R₁ S (Note: Alternate notations: Hindustani: Ṡ N D P M̄ R Ṟ S; Western: C B A G F♯ E D♭ C)

The notes used in this scale are shuddha rishabham, shuddha gandharam, prati madhyamam, chathusruthi dhaivatham and kakali nishadham. It is a sampurna rāgam – a rāgam that has all seven swaras (notes). It is the prati madhyamam equivalent of Manavati, which is the 5th melakarta scale.
