= Yagapriya =

31st raga in the Melakarta

- Arohanam: S R₃ G₃ M₁ P D₁ N₁ Ṡ
- Avarohanam: Ṡ N₁ D₁ P M₁ G₃ R₃ S

Yagapriya (pronounced yāgapriya) is a rāgam in Carnatic music (musical scale of South Indian classical music). It is the 31st melakarta rāgam in the 72 melakarta rāgam system of Carnatic music. It is called Kalāvati in Muthuswami Dikshitar school of Carnatic music. Like many other rāgas, Kalāvati has been adopted in Hindustani music as well.

== Structure and Lakshana ==
Yagapriya scale with shadjam at C

It is the 1st rāgam in the 6th chakra Rutu. The mnemonic name is Rutu-Pa. The mnemonic phrase is sa ru gu ma pa dha na. Its ārohaṇa-avarohaṇa structure (ascending and descending scale) is as follows (see swaras in Carnatic music for details on below notation and terms):

- ārohaṇa: S R₃ G₃ M₁ P D₁ N₁ Ṡ (Note: Alternate notations: Hindustani: S G̱ G M P Ḏ D Ṡ; Western: C D♯ E F G A♭ B C)
- avarohaṇa: Ṡ N₁ D₁ P M₁ G₃ R₃ S (Note: Alternate notations: Hindustani: Ṡ D Ḏ P M G G̱ S; Western: C B A♭ G F E D♯ C)

The notes shatsruthi rishabham, antara gandharam, shuddha madhyamam, shuddha dhaivatham and shuddha nishadham are used in this rāgam. As Yagapriya is a melakarta, by definition it is a sampoorna rāgam (has all seven notes in ascending and descending scale). It is the shuddha madhyamam equivalent of Sucharitra, which is the 67th melakarta scale.
