= Salagam =

37th raga in the Melakarta

- Arohanam: S R₁ G₁ M₂ P D₁ N₁ Ṡ
- Avarohanam: Ṡ N₁ D₁ P M₂ G₁ R₁ S

Salagam (pronounced sālagam) is a ragam in Carnatic music (musical scale of South Indian classical music). It is the 37th melakarta rāgam in the 72 melakarta rāgam system of Carnatic music. It is called Sowgandini in Muthuswami Dikshitar school of Carnatic music.

== Structure and Lakshana ==
Salagam scale with shadjam at C

It is the 1st rāgam in the 7th chakra Rishi. The mnemonic name is Rishi-Pa. The mnemonic phrase is sa ra ga mi pa dha na. Its ārohaṇa-avarohaṇa structure (ascending and descending scale) is as follows (see swaras in Carnatic music for details on below notation and terms):

- ārohaṇa: S R₁ G₁ M₂ P D₁ N₁ Ṡ (Note: Alternate notations: Hindustani: S Ṟ R M̄ P Ḏ D Ṡ; Western: C D♭ E F♯ G A♭ B C)
- avarohaṇa: Ṡ N₁ D₁ P M₂ G₁ R₁ S (Note: Alternate notations: Hindustani: Ṡ D Ḏ P M̄ R Ṟ S; Western: C B A♭ G F♯ E D♭ C)

In this scale, the notes shuddha rishabham, shuddha gandharam, prati madhyamam, shuddha dhaivatham and shuddha nishadham are used. As Salagam is a melakarta rāgam, by definition it is a sampoorna rāgam (has all seven notes in ascending and descending scale). It is the prati madhyamam equivalent of Kanakangi, which is the first melakarta.
