= Namanarayani =

50th raga in the Melakarta

- Arohanam: S R₁ G₃ M₂ P D₁ N₂ Ṡ
- Avarohanam: Ṡ N₂ D₁ P M₂ G₃ R₁ S

Namanarayani (pronounced nāmanārāyaṇi) is a rāgam in Carnatic music (musical scale of South Indian classical music). It is the 50th Melakarta rāgam in the 72 melakarta rāgam system of Carnatic music. It is called Nāmadēshi in Muthuswami Dikshitar school of Carnatic music.

== Structure and Lakshana ==
Namanarayani scale with shadjam at C

It is the 2nd rāgam in the 9th chakra Brahma. The mnemonic name is Brahma-Sri. The mnemonic phrase is sa ra gu mi pa dha ni. Its ārohaṇa-avarohaṇa structure (ascending and descending scale) is as follows (see swaras in Carnatic music for details on below notation and terms):

- ārohaṇa: S R₁ G₃ M₂ P D₁ N₂ Ṡ (Note: Alternate notations: Hindustani: S Ṟ G M̄ P Ḏ Ṉ Ṡ; Western: C D♭ E F♯ G A♭ B♭ C)
- avarohaṇa: Ṡ N₂ D₁ P M₂ G₃ R₁ S (Note: Alternate notations: Hindustani: Ṡ Ṉ Ḏ P M̄ G Ṟ S; Western: C B♭ A♭ G F♯ E D♭ C)

(this scale uses the notes shuddha rishabham, antara gandharam, prati madhyamam, shuddha dhaivatham, kaisiki nishadham)

As it is a melakarta rāgam, by definition it is a sampoorna rāgam (has all seven notes in ascending and descending scale). It is the prati madhyamam equivalent of Vakulabharanam, which is the 14th melakarta.
