= Sucharitra =

Rāgam in Carnatic music

- Arohanam: S R₃ G₃ M₂ P D₁ N₁ Ṡ
- Avarohanam: Ṡ N₁ D₁ P M₂ G₃ R₃ S

Sucharitra is a rāgam in Carnatic music (musical scale of South Indian classical music). It is the 67th melakarta rāgam (parent scale) in the 72 melakarta rāgam system of Carnatic music. It is considered an unattractive raga and is rarely performed. It is called Santāna manjari in the Muthuswami Dikshitar school of Carnatic music.

== Structure and Lakshana ==
Sucharitra scale with shadjam at C

It is the 1st rāgam in the 12th chakra Aditya. The mnemonic name is Aditya-Pa. The mnemonic phrase is sa ru gu mi pa dha na. Its ārohaṇa-avarohaṇa structure (ascending and descending scale) is as follows (see swaras in Carnatic music for details on below notation and terms):

- ārohaṇa: S R₃ G₃ M₂ P D₁ N₁ Ṡ (Note: Alternate notations: Hindustani: S G̱ G M̄ P Ḏ D Ṡ; Western: C D♯ E F♯ G A♭ B C)
- avarohaṇa: Ṡ N₁ D₁ P M₂ G₃ R₃ S (Note: Alternate notations: Hindustani: Ṡ D Ḏ P M̄ G G̱ S; Western: C B A♭ G F♯ E D♯ C)

The swaras used in this scale are shatsruthi rishabham, antara gandharam, prati madhyamam, shuddha dhaivatham and shuddha nishadham. Sucharitra, being a melakarta rāgam, by definition is a sampoorna rāgam (has all seven notes in ascending and descending scale). It is the prati madhyamam equivalent of Yagapriya, which is the 31st melakarta scale.
