= Tanarupi =

Sixth raga in the Melakarta

- Arohanam: S R₁ G₁ M₁ P D₃ N₃ Ṡ
- Avarohanam: Ṡ N₃ D₃ P M₁ G₁ R₁ S

Tanarupi (pronounced tānarūpi, meaning the one that embodies tanam) is a rāgam in Carnatic music (musical scale of South Indian classical music). It is the 6th melakarta rāgam in the 72 melakarta rāgam system of Carnatic music. It is called Tanukeerti in Muthuswami Dikshitar school of Carnatic music.

== Structure and Lakshana ==
Tanarupi scale with shadjam at C

It is the 6th rāgam in the 1st chakra Indu. The mnemonic name is Indu-Sha. The mnemonic phrase is sa ra ga ma pa dhu nu. Its ārohaṇa-avarohaṇa structure (ascending and descending scale) is as follows (see swaras in Carnatic music for details on below notation and terms):

- ārohaṇa: S R₁ G₁ M₁ P D₃ N₃ Ṡ (Note: Alternate notations: Hindustani: S Ṟ R M P Ṉ N Ṡ; Western: C D♭ E F G A♯ B C)
- avarohaṇa: Ṡ N₃ D₃ P M₁ G₁ R₁ S (Note: Alternate notations: Hindustani: Ṡ N Ṉ P M R Ṟ S; Western: C B A♯ G F E D♭ C)

The notes used in this scale are shuddha rishabham, shuddha gandharam, shuddha madhyamam, shatsruthi dhaivatham and kakali nishadham. As it is a melakarta rāgam, by definition it is a sampoorna rāgam (has all seven notes in ascending and descending scale). It is the shuddha madhyamam equivalent of Raghupriya, which is the 42nd melakarta rāgam.

== Asampurna Melakarta ==
Tanukeerti is the 6th Melakarta in the original list compiled by Venkatamakhin. The notes used in the scale are the same, but the ascending scale and descending scale are different. It is an audava-vakra sampurna raga (5 notes in ascending scale, while full 7 are used in descending scale in a zig-zag manner).

- ārohaṇa: S R₁ M₁ P N₃ Ṡ (Note: Alternate notations: Hindustani: S Ṟ M P N Ṡ; Western: C D♭ F G B C)
- avarohaṇa: Ṡ N₃ D₃ N₃ P M₁ G₁ R₁ S (Note: Alternate notations: Hindustani: Ṡ N Ṉ N P M R Ṟ S; Western: C B A♯ B G F E D♭ C)
