= Jhalavarali =

39th raga in the Melakarta

- Arohanam: S R₁ G₁ M₂ P D₁ N₃ Ṡ
- Avarohanam: Ṡ N₃ D₁ P M₂ G₁ R₁ S

Jhalavarali (pronounced Jhālavarāḻi, meaning A moon with the sun's heat), is a ragam in Carnatic music (musical scale of South Indian classical music). It is the 39th Melakarta rāgam in the 72 melakarta rāgam system of Carnatic music.

It is called Dhālivarāḻi(Varāḻi) in Muthuswami Dikshitar school of Carnatic music.

== Structure and Lakshana ==
Jhalavarali scale with shadjam at C

It is the 3rd rāgam in the 7th chakra Rishi. The mnemonic name is Rishi-Go. The mnemonic phrase is sa ra ga mi pa dha nu. Its ārohaṇa-avarohaṇa structure (ascending and descending scale) is as follows (see swaras in Carnatic music for details on below notation and terms):

- ārohaṇa: S R₁ G₁ M₂ P D₁ N₃ Ṡ (Note: Alternate notations: Hindustani: S Ṟ R M̄ P Ḏ N Ṡ; Western: C D♭ E F♯ G A♭ B C)
- avarohaṇa: Ṡ N₃ D₁ P M₂ G₁ R₁ S (Note: Alternate notations: Hindustani: Ṡ N Ḏ P M̄ R Ṟ S; Western: C B A♭ G F♯ E D♭ C)

(the notes in this scale : shuddha rishabham, shuddha gandharam, prati madhyamam, shuddha dhaivatham, kakali nishadham)

As it is a melakarta rāgam, by definition it is a sampoorna rāgam (has all seven notes in ascending and descending scale). It is the prati madhyamam equivalent of Ganamoorti, which is the 3rd melakarta.

== Janya rāgams ==
Jhalavarali has a few janya rāgams (derived scale) associated with it, of which Varali is very popular. See List of janya rāgams for full list of rāgams associated with Jhalavarali.
