= Navaneetam =

40th raga in the Melakarta

- Arohanam: S R₁ G₁ M₂ P D₂ N₂ Ṡ
- Avarohanam: Ṡ N₂ D₂ P M₂ G₁ R₁ S

Navaneetam (pronounced navanītam, meaning the eternal new one) is a rāgam in Carnatic music (musical scale of South Indian classical music). It is the 40th Melakarta rāgam (parent scale) in the 72 melakarta rāgam system of Carnatic music. It is called Nabhōmaṇi in Muthuswami Dikshitar school of Carnatic music. Navaneetham is a Sanskrit word meaning fresh butter. 'Nava' meaning fresh (new) and 'neetham' meaning butter.

== Structure and Lakshana ==
Navaneetam scale with shadjam at C

It is the 4th rāgam in the 7th chakra Rishi. The mnemonic name is Rishi-Bhu. The mnemonic phrase is sa ra ga mi pa dhi ni. Its ārohaṇa-avarohaṇa structure (ascending and descending scale) is as follows (see swaras in Carnatic music for details on below notation and terms):

- ārohaṇa: S R₁ G₁ M₂ P D₂ N₂ Ṡ (Note: Alternate notations: Hindustani: S Ṟ R M̄ P D Ṉ Ṡ; Western: C D♭ E F♯ G A B♭ C)
- avarohaṇa: Ṡ N₂ D₂ P M₂ G₁ R₁ S (Note: Alternate notations: Hindustani: Ṡ Ṉ D P M̄ R Ṟ S; Western: C B♭ A G F♯ E D♭ C)

(this scale uses the notes shuddha rishabham, shuddha gandharam, prati madhyamam, chatushruti dhaivatam, kaisiki nishadam)

As it is a melakarta rāgam, by definition it is a sampūrṇa rāgam (has all seven notes in ascending and descending scale). It is the prati madhyamam equivalent of Vanaspati, which is the 4th melakarta rāgam.
