= Suvarnangi =

47th raga in the Melakarta

- Arohanam: S R₁ G₂ M₂ P D₂ N₃ Ṡ
- Avarohanam: Ṡ N₃ D₂ P M₂ G₂ R₁ S

Suvarnangi (pronounced Suvarṇāngi, meaning the golden bodied one) is a rāgam in Carnatic music (musical scale of South Indian classical music). It is the 47th melakarta rāgam in the 72 melakarta rāgam system of Carnatic music. It is called Souveeram or Sauviram in Muthuswami Dikshitar school of Carnatic music.

== Structure and Lakshana ==
Suvarnangi scale with shadjam at C

It is the 5th rāgam in the 8th chakra Vasu. The mnemonic name is Vasu-Ma. The mnemonic phrase is sa ra gi mi pa dhi nu. Its ārohaṇa-avarohaṇa structure (ascending and descending scale) is as follows (see swaras in Carnatic music for details on below notation and terms):

- ārohaṇa: S R₁ G₂ M₂ P D₂ N₃ Ṡ (Note: Alternate notations: Hindustani: S Ṟ G̱ M̄ P D N Ṡ; Western: C D♭ E♭ F♯ G A B C)
- avarohaṇa: Ṡ N₃ D₂ P M₂ G₂ R₁ S (Note: Alternate notations: Hindustani: Ṡ N D P M̄ G̱ Ṟ S; Western: C B A G F♯ E♭ D♭ C)

Its swaras are shuddha rishabham, sadharana gandharam, prati madhyamam, chathusruthi dhaivatham and kakali nishadham. As it is a melakarta rāgam, by definition it is a sampoorna rāgam (has all seven notes in ascending and descending scale). It is the prati madhyamam equivalent of Kokilapriya, which is the 11th melakarta.

== Janya rāgams ==
Suvarnangi has a few minor janya rāgams (derived scales) associated with it. See List of janya rāgams for full list of rāgams associated with Suvarnangi.
