= Jalarnavam =

38th raga in the Melakarta

- Arohanam: S R₁ G₁ M₂ P D₁ N₂ Ṡ
- Avarohanam: Ṡ N₂ D₁ P M₂ G₁ R₁ S

Jalarnavam (pronounced jalārṇavam, meaning the ocean) is a ragam in Carnatic music (musical scale of South Indian classical music). It is the 38th Melakarta rāgam in the 72 melakarta rāgam system of Carnatic music.

It is called Jaganmōhanam in Muthuswami Dikshitar school of Carnatic music.

== Structure and Lakshana ==
Jalarnavam scale with shadjam at C

It is the 2nd rāgam in the 7th chakra Rishi. The mnemonic name is Rishi-Sri. The mnemonic phrase is sa ra ga mi pa dha ni. Its ārohaṇa-avarohaṇa structure (ascending and descending scale) is as follows (see swaras in Carnatic music for details on below notation and terms):

- ārohaṇa: S R₁ G₁ M₂ P D₁ N₂ Ṡ (Note: Alternate notations: Hindustani: S Ṟ R M̄ P Ḏ Ṉ Ṡ; Western: C D♭ E F♯ G A♭ B♭ C)
- avarohaṇa: Ṡ N₂ D₁ P M₂ G₁ R₁ S (Note: Alternate notations: Hindustani: Ṡ Ṉ Ḏ P M̄ R Ṟ S; Western: C B♭ A♭ G F♯ E D♭ C)

(the specific notes used in this scale are shuddha rishabham, shuddha gandharam, prati madhyamam, shuddha dhaivatham, kaisiki nishadham)

As it is a melakarta rāgam, by definition it is a sampoorna rāgam (has all seven notes in ascending and descending scale). It is the prati madhyamam equivalent of Ratnangi, which is the 2nd melakarta.
