= Dhavalambari =

49th raga in the Melakarta

- Arohanam: S R₁ G₃ M₂ P D₁ N₁ Ṡ
- Avarohanam: Ṡ N₁ D₁ P M₂ G₃ R₁ S

Dhavalambari (pronounced dhavaḻāmbari) is a rāgam in Carnatic music (musical scale of South Indian classical music). It is the 49th Melakarta rāgam in the 72 melakarta rāgam system of Carnatic music. It is called Dhavaḻāngam or Dhavaḻāngi in Muthuswami Dikshitar school of Carnatic music.

== Structure and Lakshana ==
Dhavalambari scale with Shadjam at C

It is the 1st rāgam in the 9th chakra Brahma. The mnemonic name is Brahma-Pa. The mnemonic phrase is sa ra gu mi pa dha na. Its ārohaṇa-avarohaṇa structure (ascending and descending scale) is as follows (see swaras in Carnatic music for details on below notation and terms):

- ārohaṇa: S R₁ G₃ M₂ P D₁ N₁ Ṡ (Note: Alternate notations: Hindustani: S Ṟ G M̄ P Ḏ D Ṡ; Western: C D♭ E F♯ G A♭ B C)
- avarohaṇa: Ṡ N₁ D₁ P M₂ G₃ R₁ S (Note: Alternate notations: Hindustani: Ṡ D Ḏ P M̄ G Ṟ S; Western: C B A♭ G F♯ E D♭ C)

(the notes used in this scale are shuddha rishabham, antara gandharam, prati madhyamam, shuddha dhaivatham, shuddha nishadham)

As it is a melakarta rāgam, by definition it is a sampoorna rāgam (has all seven notes in ascending and descending scale). It is the prati madhyamam equivalent of Gayakapriya, which is the 13th melakarta.
