= Gavambhodi =

43rd raga in the Melakarta

Gavambodhi
- Arohanam: S R₁ G₂ M₂ P D₁ N₁ Ṡ
- Avarohanam: Ṡ N₁ D₁ P M₂ G₂ R₁ S

Gavambodhi (pronounced gavāmbōdhi, meaning The teacher of the cows) is a ragam in Carnatic music (musical scale of South Indian classical music). It is the 43rd Melakarta rāgam in the 72 melakarta rāgam system of Carnatic music. It is called Geervāṇi or Girvāṇi in Muthuswami Dikshitar school of Carnatic music.

== Structure and Lakshana ==
Gavambodhi scale with Shadjam at C

It is the 1st rāgam in the 8th chakra Vasu. The mnemonic name is Vasu-Pa. The mnemonic phrase is sa ra gi mi pa dha na. Its ārohaṇa-avarohaṇa structure (ascending and descending scale) is as follows (see swaras in Carnatic music for details on below notation and terms):

- ārohaṇa: S R₁ G₂ M₂ P D₁ N₁ Ṡ (Note: Alternate notations: Hindustani: S Ṟ G̱ M̄ P Ḏ D Ṡ; Western: C D♭ E♭ F♯ G A♭ B C)
- avarohaṇa: Ṡ N₁ D₁ P M₂ G₂ R₁ S (Note: Alternate notations: Hindustani: Ṡ D Ḏ P M̄ G̱ Ṟ S; Western: C B A♭ G F♯ E♭ D♭ C)

(the notes used in this scale are shuddha rishabham, sadharana gandharam, prati madhyamam, shuddha dhaivatham, shuddha nishadham)

As it is a melakarta rāgam, by definition it is a sampoorna rāgam (has all seven notes in ascending and descending scale). It is the prati madhyamam equivalent of Senavati, which is the 7th melakarta.
