= Senavati =

Seventh raga in the Melakarta

- Arohanam: S R₁ G₂ M₁ P D₁ N₁ Ṡ
- Avarohanam: Ṡ N₁ D₁ P M₁ G₂ R₁ S

Senavati (pronounced sēnāvati) is a ragam in Carnatic music (musical scale of South Indian classical music). It is the 7th melakarta rāgam (parent scale) in the 72 melakarta rāgam system of Carnatic music. It is called Senāgrani in Muthuswami Dikshitar school of Carnatic music.

== Structure and Lakshana ==
Senavati scale with shadjam at C

It is the 1st rāgam in the 2nd chakra Netra. The mnemonic name is Netra-Pa. The mnemonic phrase is sa ra gi ma pa dha na. Its ārohaṇa-avarohaṇa structure (ascending and descending scale) is as follows (see swaras in Carnatic music for details on below notation and terms):

- ārohaṇa: S R₁ G₂ M₁ P D₁ N₁ Ṡ (Note: Alternate notations: Hindustani: S Ṟ G̱ M P Ḏ D Ṡ; Western: C D♭ E♭ F G A♭ B C)
- avarohaṇa: Ṡ N₁ D₁ P M₁ G₂ R₁ S (Note: Alternate notations: Hindustani: Ṡ D Ḏ P M G̱ Ṟ S; Western: C B A♭ G F E♭ D♭ C)

The swaras in this rāgam are shuddha rishabham, sadharana gandharam, shuddha madhyamam, shuddha dhaivatham and shuddha nishadham. As it is a melakarta rāgam, by definition it is a sampoorna rāgam (has all seven notes in ascending and descending scale). It is the shuddha madhyamam equivalent of Gavambhodi, which is the 43rd melakarta scale.

== Asampurna Melakarta ==
Senāgrani is the 7th Melakarta in the original list compiled by Venkatamakhin. The notes used in the scale are the same, but the ascending scale and descending scales are with vakra prayoga (zig-zag order in usage of notes).

- ārohaṇa: S R₁ G₂ R₁ M₁ G₂ M₁ P N₁ D₁ Ṡ (Note: Alternate notations: Hindustani: S Ṟ G̱ Ṟ M G̱ M P D Ḏ Ṡ; Western: C D♭ E♭ D♭ F E♭ F G B A♭ C)
- avarohaṇa: Ṡ N₁ D₁ P M₁ G₂ M₁ G₂ R₁ S (Note: Alternate notations: Hindustani: Ṡ D Ḏ P M G̱ M G̱ Ṟ S; Western: C B A♭ G F E♭ F E♭ D♭ C)
