= Varunapriya =

24th raga in the Melakarta

- Arohanam: S R₂ G₂ M₁ P D₃ N₃ Ṡ
- Avarohanam: Ṡ N₃ D₃ P M₁ G₂ R₂ S

Varunapriya (pronounced varuṇapriya) is a rāgam in Carnatic music (musical scale of South Indian classical music). It is the 24th melakarta rāgam (parent scale) in the 72 melakarta rāgam system of Carnatic music. It is called Viravasantam; in Muthuswami Dikshitar school of Carnatic music.

== Structure and Lakshana ==
Varunapriya scale with shadjam at C

It is the 6th rāgam in the 4th chakra Veda. The mnemonic name is Veda-Sha. The mnemonic phrase is sa ri gi ma pa dhu nu. Its ārohaṇa-avarohaṇa structure (ascending and descending scale) is as follows (see swaras in Carnatic music for details on below notation and terms):

- ārohaṇa: S R₂ G₂ M₁ P D₃ N₃ Ṡ (Note: Alternate notations: Hindustani: S R G̱ M P Ṉ N Ṡ; Western: C D E♭ F G A♯ B C)
- avarohaṇa: Ṡ N₃ D₃ P M₁ G₂ R₂ S (Note: Alternate notations: Hindustani: Ṡ N Ṉ P M G̱ R S; Western: C B A♯ G F E♭ D C)

The notes chathusruthi rishabham, sadharana gandharam, shuddha madhyamam, shatsruthi dhaivatham and kakali nishadham are used in this scale. As it is a melakarta, by definition it is a sampoorna rāgam (has all seven notes in ascending and descending scale). It is the shuddha madhyamam equivalent of Neetimati, which is the 60th melakarta scale.
