= Shadvidamargini =

46th raga in the Melakarta

Shadvidhamargini
- Arohanam: S R₁ G₂ M₂ P D₂ N₂ Ṡ
- Avarohanam: Ṡ N₂ D₂ P M₂ G₂ R₁ S

Shadvidhamargini (pronounced Shaḍvidhamārgini, meaning the one with the path to six forms of knowledge) is a ragam in Carnatic music (musical scale of South Indian classical music). It is the 46th melakarta rāgam (parent scale) in the 72 melakarta rāgam system of Carnatic music. It is called Stavarājam in Muthuswami Dikshitar school of Carnatic music.

== Structure and Lakshana ==
Shadvidamargini scale with shadjam at C

It is the 4th rāgam in the 8th chakra Vasu. The mnemonic name is Vasu-Bhu. The mnemonic phrase is sa ra gi mi pa dhi ni. Its ārohaṇa-avarohaṇa structure (ascending and descending scale) is as follows (see swaras in Carnatic music for details on below notation and terms):

- ārohaṇa: S R₁ G₂ M₂ P D₂ N₂ Ṡ (Note: Alternate notations: Hindustani: S Ṟ G̱ M̄ P D Ṉ Ṡ; Western: C D♭ E♭ F♯ G A B♭ C)
- avarohaṇa: Ṡ N₂ D₂ P M₂ G₂ R₁ S (Note: Alternate notations: Hindustani: Ṡ Ṉ D P M̄ G̱ Ṟ S; Western: C B♭ A G F♯ E♭ D♭ C)

The swaras shuddha rishabham, sadharana gandharam, prati madhyamam, chathusruthi dhaivatham and kaisiki nishadham are used in this scale. As it is a melakarta rāgam, by definition it is a sampoorna rāgam (has all seven notes in ascending and descending scale). It is the prati madhyamam equivalent of Natakapriya, which is the 10th melakarta scale.
