= Charukesi =

Melody in Carnatic music

- Arohanam: S R₂ G₃ M₁ P D₁ N₂ Ṡ
- Avarohanam: Ṡ N₂ D₁ P M₁ G₃ R₂ S
- Equivalent: Aeolian dominant scale

Charukesi (pronounced chārukēś‌i) is a rāga in Carnatic music (musical scale of South Indian classical music). It is the 26th Melakarta rāgam in the 72 melakarta rāgam system of Carnatic music. It is called Tarangini in Muthuswami Dikshitar school of Carnatic music.

Charukesi is used in devotional music. Its mood is poignant and the raga is usually easily identified.

== Structure and Lakshana ==
Charukesi scale with Shadjam at C

It is the 2nd rāgam in the 5th chakra Bana. The mnemonic name is Bana-Sri. The mnemonic phrase is sa ri gu ma pa dha ni. Its ārohaṇa-avarohaṇa structure (ascending and descending scale) is as follows (see swaras in Carnatic music for details on below notation and terms):

- ārohaṇa: S R₂ G₃ M₁ P D₁ N₂ Ṡ (Note: Alternate notations: Hindustani: S R G M P Ḏ Ṉ Ṡ; Western: C D E F G A♭ B♭ C)
- avarohaṇa: Ṡ N₂ D₁ P M₁ G₃ R₂ S (Note: Alternate notations: Hindustani: Ṡ Ṉ Ḏ P M G R S; Western: C B♭ A♭ G F E D C)

(chathusruthi rishabham, anthara gandharam, shuddha madhyamam, shuddha dhaivatham, kaisiki nishadham)

It is a sampoorna rāgam - a rāgam that has all seven swaras (notes). It is the shuddha madhyamam equivalent of Rishabhapriya, which is the 62nd melakarta.

The structure is the equivalent of an Aeolian dominant scale, also known as the Mixolydian b-6 scale.
