= Kantamani =

61st raga in the Melakarta

- Arohanam: S R₂ G₃ M₂ P D₁ N₁ Ṡ
- Avarohanam: Ṡ N₁ D₁ P M₂ G₃ R₂ S

Kantamani (pronounced kāntāmaṇi) is a ragam in Carnatic music (musical scale of South Indian classical music). It is the 61st Melakarta rāgam in the 72 melakarta rāgam system of Carnatic music. It is called Kuntalam in Muthuswami Dikshitar school of Carnatic music.

== Structure and Lakshana ==
Kantamani scale with shadjam at C

It is the 1st rāgam in the 11th chakra Rudra. The mnemonic name is Rudra-Pa. The mnemonic phrase is sa ri gu mi pa dha na. Its ārohaṇa-avarohaṇa structure (ascending and descending scale) is as follows (see swaras in Carnatic music for details on below notation and terms):

- ārohaṇa: S R₂ G₃ M₂ P D₁ N₁ Ṡ (Note: Alternate notations: Hindustani: S R G M̄ P Ḏ D Ṡ; Western: C D E F♯ G A♭ B C)
- avarohaṇa: Ṡ N₁ D₁ P M₂ G₃ R₂ S (Note: Alternate notations: Hindustani: Ṡ D Ḏ P M̄ G R S; Western: C B A♭ G F♯ E D C)

(the notes used in this scale are chathusruthi rishabham, antara gandharam, prati madhyamam, shuddha dhaivatham, shuddha nishadham)

As it is a melakarta rāgam, by definition it is a sampoorna rāgam (has all seven notes in ascending and descending scale). It is the prati madhyamam equivalent of Mararanjani, which is the 25th melakarta.
