= Neetimati =

60th raga in the Melakarta

- Arohanam: S R₂ G₂ M₂ P D₃ N₃ Ṡ
- Avarohanam: Ṡ N₃ D₃ P M₂ G₂ R₂ S

Neetimati is a rāgam in Carnatic music (musical scale of South Indian classical music). It is the 60th melakarta rāgam (parent scale) in the 72 melakarta rāgam system of Carnatic music. It is called Nishādham in Muthuswami Dikshitar school of Carnatic music.

== Structure and Lakshana ==
Neetimati scale with shadjam at C

It is the 6th rāgam in the 10th chakra Disi. The mnemonic name is Disi-Sha. The mnemonic phrase is sa ri gi mi pa dhu nu. Its ārohaṇa-avarohaṇa structure (ascending and descending scale) is as follows (see swaras in Carnatic music for details on below notation and terms):

- ārohaṇa: S R₂ G₂ M₂ P D₃ N₃ Ṡ (Note: Alternate notations: Hindustani: S R G̱ M̄ P Ṉ N Ṡ; Western: C D E♭ F♯ G A♯ B C)
- avarohaṇa: Ṡ N₃ D₃ P M₂ G₂ R₂ S (Note: Alternate notations: Hindustani: Ṡ N Ṉ P M̄ G̱ R S; Western: C B A♯ G F♯ E♭ D C)

(this scale uses the notes chathusruthi rishabham, sadharana gandharam, prati madhyamam, shatsruthi dhaivatham, kakali nishadham)

As it is a melakarta rāgam, by definition it is a sampoorna rāgam (has all seven notes in ascending and descending scale). It is the prati madhyamam equivalent of Varunapriya, which is the 24th melakarta rāgam.
