= Manavati =

Fifth raga in the Melakarta

- Arohanam: S R₁ G₁ M₁ P D₂ N₃ Ṡ
- Avarohanam: Ṡ N₃ D₂ P M₁ G₁ R₁ S

Manavati (pronounced mānavati, meaning the bride) is a rāgam in Carnatic music (musical scale of South Indian classical music). It is the 5th Melakarta rāgam in the 72 melakarta rāgam system of Carnatic music. In Muthuswami Dikshitar school of Carnatic music, the 5th melakarta is Manōranjani.

== Structure and Lakshana ==
Manavati scale with shadjam at C

It is the 5th rāgam in the 1st chakra Indu. The mnemonic name is Indu-Ma. The mnemonic phrase is sa ra ga ma pa dhi nu. Its ārohaṇa-avarohaṇa structure (ascending and descending scale) is as follows (see swaras in Carnatic music for details on below notation and terms):

- ārohaṇa: S R₁ G₁ M₁ P D₂ N₃ Ṡ (Note: Alternate notations: Hindustani: S Ṟ R M P D N Ṡ; Western: C D♭ E F G A B C)
- avarohaṇa: Ṡ N₃ D₂ P M₁ G₁ R₁ S (Note: Alternate notations: Hindustani: Ṡ N D P M R Ṟ S; Western: C B A G F E D♭ C)

(this scale uses the notes shuddha rishabham, shuddha gandharam, shuddha madhyamam, chathusruthi dhaivatham, kakali nishadham)

As it is a melakarta rāgam, by definition it is a sampoorna rāgam (has all seven notes in ascending and descending scale). It is the shuddha madhyamam equivalent of Pāvani, which is the 41st melakarta.

== Asampurna Melakarta ==
Manōranjani is the 5th Melakarta in the original list compiled by Venkatamakhin. The notes used in the scale are the same, but the ascending scale is different. It is a shadava-sampurna raga (6 notes in ascending scale, while full 7 are used in descending scale).

- ārohaṇa: S R₁ M₁ P D₂ N₃ Ṡ (Note: Alternate notations: Hindustani: S Ṟ M P D N Ṡ; Western: C D♭ F G A B C)
- avarohaṇa: Ṡ N₃ D₂ P M₁ G₁ R₁ S (Note: Alternate notations: Hindustani: Ṡ N D P M R Ṟ S; Western: C B A G F E D♭ C)
