= Vishwambari =

54th raga in the Melakarta

- Arohanam: S R₁ G₃ M₂ P D₃ N₃ Ṡ
- Avarohanam: Ṡ N₃ D₃ P M₂ G₃ R₁ S

Vishwambari is a rāgam in Carnatic music (musical scale of South Indian classical music). It is the 54th melakarta rāgam in the 72 melakarta rāgam system of Carnatic music. It is called Vamshavati in Muthuswami Dikshitar school of Carnatic music.

== Structure and Lakshana ==
Vishwambari scale with shadjam at C

It is the 6th rāgam in the 9th chakra Brahma. The mnemonic name is Brahma-Sha. The mnemonic phrase is sa ra gu mi pa dhu nu. Its ārohaṇa-avarohaṇa structure (ascending and descending scale) is as follows (see swaras in Carnatic music for details on below notation and terms):

- ārohaṇa: S R₁ G₃ M₂ P D₃ N₃ Ṡ (Note: Alternate notations: Hindustani: S Ṟ G M̄ P Ṉ N Ṡ; Western: C D♭ E F♯ G A♯ B C)
- avarohaṇa: Ṡ N₃ D₃ P M₂ G₃ R₁ S (Note: Alternate notations: Hindustani: Ṡ N Ṉ P M̄ G Ṟ S; Western: C B A♯ G F♯ E D♭ C)

Shuddha rishabham, antara gandharam, prati madhyamam, shatsruthi dhaivatham and kakali nishadham are the notes used in this scale, other than shadjam and panchamam. As Vishwambari is a melakarta, by definition it is a sampoorna rāgam (has all seven notes in ascending and descending scale). It is the prati madhyamam equivalent of Hatakambari, which is the 18th melakarta scale.
