= Naganandini =

30th raga in the Melakarta

- Arohanam: S R₂ G₃ M₁ P D₃ N₃ Ṡ
- Avarohanam: Ṡ N₃ D₃ P M₁ G₃ R₂ S

Naganandini (pronounced naga + nandini-daughter ( nandini ) of Naga/Mountain i.e. Pārvati) is a ragam (musical scale) in Carnatic music (South Indian classical music). It is the 30th Melakarta rāgam in the 72 melakarta rāgam system of Carnatic music. It is called Nagābharanam in Muthuswami Dikshitar school of Carnatic music.

== Structure and Lakshana ==
Naganandini scale with shadjam at C

It is the 6th rāgam in the 5th chakra Bana. The mnemonic name is Bana-Sha. The mnemonic phrase is sa ri gu ma pa dhu nu. Its ārohaṇa-avarohaṇa structure (ascending and descending scale) is as follows (see swaras in Carnatic music for details on below notation and terms):

- ārohaṇa: S R₂ G₃ M₁ P D₃ N₃ Ṡ (Note: Alternate notations: Hindustani: S R G M P Ṉ N Ṡ; Western: C D E F G A♯ B C)
- avarohaṇa: Ṡ N₃ D₃ P M₁ G₃ R₂ S (Note: Alternate notations: Hindustani: Ṡ N Ṉ P M G R S; Western: C B A♯ G F E D C)

(the scale uses the notes chathusruthi rishabham, antara gandharam, shuddha madhyamam, shatsruthi dhaivatham, kakali nishadham)

As it is a melakarta rāgam, by definition it is a sampoorna rāgam (has all seven notes in ascending and descending scale). It is the shuddha madhyamam equivalent of Chitrambari, the 66th melakarta.
