= Gangeyabhushani =

33rd raga in the Melakarta

- Arohanam: S R₃ G₃ M₁ P D₁ N₃ Ṡ
- Avarohanam: Ṡ N₃ D₁ P M₁ G₃ R₃ S

Gangeyabhushani (pronounced gāngæyabhūshani) is a ragam in Carnatic music (musical scale of South Indian classical music). It is the 33rd Melakarta rāgam in the 72 melakarta rāgam system of Carnatic music.

It is called Gangātarangini in Muthuswami Dikshitar school of Carnatic music.

== Structure and Lakshana ==
Gangeyabhushani scale with Shadjam at C

It is the 3rd rāgam in the 6th chakra Rutu. The mnemonic name is Rutu-Go. The mnemonic phrase is sa ru gu ma pa dha nu. Its ārohaṇa-avarohaṇa structure (ascending and descending scale) is as follows (see swaras in Carnatic music for details on below notation and terms):

- ārohaṇa: S R₃ G₃ M₁ P D₁ N₃ Ṡ (Note: Alternate notations: Hindustani: S G̱ G M P Ḏ N Ṡ; Western: C D♯ E F G A♭ B C)
- avarohaṇa: Ṡ N₃ D₁ P M₁ G₃ R₃ S (Note: Alternate notations: Hindustani: Ṡ N Ḏ P M G G̱ S; Western: C B A♭ G F E D♯ C)

The notes present in this scale are shatsruthi rishabham, antara gandharam, shuddha madhyamam, shuddha dhaivatham, kakali nishadham.

As it is a melakarta rāgam, by definition it is a sampoorna rāgam (has all seven notes in ascending and descending scale). It is the shuddha madhyamam equivalent of Dhatuvardani, which is the 69th melakarta.
