= Shamalangi =

55th raga in the Melakarta

- Arohanam: S R₂ G₂ M₂ P D₁ N₁ Ṡ
- Avarohanam: Ṡ N₁ D₁ P M₂ G₂ R₂ S

Shamalangi or Shyamalangi (pronounced shāmaḻāngi) is a ragam in Carnatic music (classical music of southern India). It is the 55th in the 72 melakarta rāgam system of Carnatic music, and is called Shāmaḻam in the Muthuswami Dikshitar school of that genre.

== Structure and Lakshana ==
Shamalangi scale with shadjam at C

Shamalang is the 1st rāgam in the 10th chakra Disi. Its mnemonic name is Disi-Pa; the mnemonic phrase associated with it is sa ri gi mi pa dha na. Its ārohaṇa-avarohaṇa structure (ascending and descending scale) is as follows (see swaras in Carnatic music for details on notation and terms):

- ārohaṇa: S R₂ G₂ M₂ P D₁ N₁ Ṡ (Note: Alternate notations: Hindustani: S R G̱ M̄ P Ḏ D Ṡ; Western: C D E♭ F♯ G A♭ B C)
- avarohaṇa: Ṡ N₁ D₁ P M₂ G₂ R₂ S (Note: Alternate notations: Hindustani: Ṡ D Ḏ P M̄ G̱ R S; Western: C B A♭ G F♯ E♭ D C)

Shamalangi's swaras are chathusruthi rishabham, sadharana gandharam, prati madhyamam, shuddha dhaivatham and shuddha nishadham. As it is a melakarta rāgam, by definition it is a sampoorna rāgam (containing all seven notes in ascending and descending scale). It is the prati madhyamam equivalent of Jhankaradhwani, which is the 19th melakarta scale.
