= Ganamurti =

Third raga in the Melakarta

- Arohanam: S R₁ G₁ M₁ P D₁ N₃ Ṡ
- Avarohanam: Ṡ N₃ D₁ P M₁ G₁ R₁ S

Ganamurti (pronounced gānamūrti, meaning the idol of music) is a ragam in Carnatic music (musical scale of South Indian classical music). It is the 3rd Melakarta rāgam in the 72 melakarta rāgam system of Carnatic music.

It is called Gānasāmavarāḷi in Muthuswami Dikshitar school of Carnatic music.

== Structure and Lakshana ==
Ganamurti scale with Shadjam at C

It is the 3rd rāgam in the 1st chakra Indu. The mnemonic name is Indu-Go. The mnemonic phrase is sa ra ga ma pa dha nu. Its ārohaṇa-avarohaṇa structure (ascending and descending scale) is as follows (see swaras in Carnatic music for details on below notation and terms):

- ārohaṇa: S R₁ G₁ M₁ P D₁ N₃ Ṡ (Note: Alternate notations: Hindustani: S Ṟ R M P Ḏ N Ṡ; Western: C D♭ E F G A♭ B C)
- avarohaṇa: Ṡ N₃ D₁ P M₁ G₁ R₁ S (Note: Alternate notations: Hindustani: Ṡ N Ḏ P M R Ṟ S; Western: C B A♭ G F E D♭ C)

The notes used in this scale are shuddha rishabham, shuddha gandharam, shuddha madhyamam, shuddha dhaivatham, kakali nishadham.

As it is a melakarta rāgam, by definition it is a sampoorna rāgam (has all seven notes in ascending and descending scale). It is the shuddha madhyamam equivalent of Jhalavarali, which is the 39th melakarta.

== Asampurna Melakarta ==
Gānasāmavarāḷi is the 3rd Melakarta in the original list compiled by Venkatamakhin. The notes used in the scale are the same, but the ascending scale is different. It is a shadava-sampurna raga (6 notes in ascending scale, while full 7 are used in descending scale).

- ārohaṇa: S R₁ M₁ P D₁ N₃ Ṡ (Note: Alternate notations: Hindustani: S Ṟ M P Ḏ N Ṡ; Western: C D♭ F G A♭ B C)
- avarohaṇa: Ṡ N₃ D₁ P M₁ G₁ R₁ S (Note: Alternate notations: Hindustani: Ṡ N Ḏ P M R Ṟ S; Western: C B A♭ G F E D♭ C)
