= Shulini =

35th raga in the Melakarta

- Arohanam: S R₃ G₃ M₁ P D₂ N₃ Ṡ
- Avarohanam: Ṡ N₃ D₂ P M₁ G₃ R₃ S

Shulini (pronounced shūlini) is a ragam in Carnatic music (musical scale of South Indian classical music). It is the 35th melakarta rāgam in the 72 melakarta rāgam system of Carnatic music. It is also spelled as Sulini, Shoolini or Soolini. It is called Shailadesākshi or Shailadeshi in Muthuswami Dikshitar school of Carnatic music.

== Structure and Lakshana ==
Shulini scale with shadjam at C

It is the 5th rāgam in the 6th chakra Rutu. The mnemonic name is Rutu-Ma. The mnemonic phrase is sa ru gu ma pa dhi nu. Its ārohaṇa-avarohaṇa structure (ascending and descending scale) is as follows (see swaras in Carnatic music for details on below notation and terms):

- ārohaṇa: S R₃ G₃ M₁ P D₂ N₃ Ṡ (Note: Alternate notations: Hindustani: S G̱ G M P D N Ṡ; Western: C D♯ E F G A B C)
- avarohaṇa: Ṡ N₃ D₂ P M₁ G₃ R₃ S (Note: Alternate notations: Hindustani: Ṡ N D P M G G̱ S; Western: C B A G F E D♯ C)

The notes used in this scale are shatsruthi rishabham, antara gandharam, shuddha madhyamam, chathusruthi dhaivatham and kakali nishadham.

As it is a melakarta rāgam, by definition it is a sampoorna rāgam (has all seven notes in ascending and descending scale). It is the shuddha madhyamam equivalent of Kosalam, which is the 71st melakarta scale.
