= Ragavardhini =

32nd raga in the Melakarta; major part of the alapana of a raga

- Arohanam: S R₃ G₃ M₁ P D₁ N₂ Ṡ
- Avarohanam: Ṡ N₂ D₁ P M₁ G₃ R₃ S

Ragavardhini (pronounced rāgavardini) has two separate meanings in Indian classical music:

- a major part of the alapana of a raga. The performer gives a step-by-step elaboration of the raga, pausing at each major note or swara.
- the 32nd melakarta raga in the Katapayadi sankhya scheme of Carnatic music.

== Melakarta ==
It is the 32nd melakarta rāgam in the 72 melakarta rāgam system of Carnatic music. It is called Rāgachudāmaṇi in Muthuswami Dikshitar school of Carnatic music.

== Structure and Lakshana ==
Ragavardini scale with shadjam at C

It is the 2nd rāgam in the 6th chakra Ritu. The mnemonic name is Ritu-Sri. The mnemonic phrase is sa ru gu ma pa dha ni. Its ārohaṇa-avarohaṇa structure is as follows (see swaras in Carnatic music for details on below notation and terms):

- ārohaṇa: S R₃ G₃ M₁ P D₁ N₂ Ṡ (Note: Alternate notations: Hindustani: S G̱ G M P Ḏ Ṉ Ṡ; Western: C D♯ E F G A♭ B♭ C)
- avarohaṇa: Ṡ N₂ D₁ P M₁ G₃ R₃ S (Note: Alternate notations: Hindustani: Ṡ Ṉ Ḏ P M G G̱ S; Western: C B♭ A♭ G F E D♯ C)

The notes in this scale are shatsruthi rishabham, antara gandharam, shuddha madhyamam, shuddha dhaivatham and kaisiki nishadham. As it is a melakarta, by definition it is a sampurna rāga (has all seven notes in ascending and descending scale). It is the shuddha madhyamam equivalent of Jyoti swarupini, which is the 68th melakarta scale.
