= Divyamani =

48th raga in the Melakarta

- Arohanam: S R₁ G₂ M₂ P D₃ N₃ Ṡ
- Avarohanam: Ṡ N₃ D₃ P M₂ G₂ R₁ S

Divyamani (pronounced Divyamaṇi, meaning the divine gem) is a rāgam in the 72 melakarta rāgam system of Carnatic music. It is the 48th in the series. It is called Jeevantika or Jeevantini in Muthuswami Dikshitar school of Carnatic music.

== Structure and Lakshana ==
Divyamani scale with Shadjam at C

It is the 6th rāgam in the 8th chakra Vasu. The mnemonic name is Vasu-Sha. The mnemonic phrase is sa ra gi mi pa dhu nu. Its ārohaṇa-avarohaṇa structure (ascending and descending scale) is as follows (see swaras in Carnatic music for details on below notation and terms):

- ārohaṇa: S R₁ G₂ M₂ P D₃ N₃ Ṡ (Note: Alternate notations: Hindustani: S Ṟ G̱ M̄ P Ṉ N Ṡ; Western: C D♭ E♭ F♯ G A♯ B C)
- avarohaṇa: Ṡ N₃ D₃ P M₂ G₂ R₁ S (Note: Alternate notations: Hindustani: Ṡ N Ṉ P M̄ G̱ Ṟ S; Western: C B A♯ G F♯ E♭ D♭ C)

(the notes used in this scale are shuddha rishabham, sadharana gandharam, prati madhyamam, shatsruthi dhaivatham, kakali nishadham)

As it is a melakarta rāgam, by definition it is a sampoorna rāgam (has all seven notes in ascending and descending scale). It is the prati madhyamam equivalent of Roopavati, which is the 12th melakarta.
