= Mararanjani =

25th raga in the Melakarta

- Arohanam: S R₂ G₃ M₁ P D₁ N₁ Ṡ
- Avarohanam: Ṡ N₁ D₁ P M₁ G₃ R₂ S

Mararanjani (pronounced māraranjani) is a rāgam in Carnatic music (musical scale of South Indian classical music). It is the 25th Melakarta rāgam in the 72 melakarta rāgam system of Carnatic music. It is called Sharāvati in Muthuswami Dikshitar school of Carnatic music.

== Structure and Lakshana ==
Mararanjani scale with shadjam at C

It is the 1st rāgam in the 5th chakra Bana. The mnemonic name is Bana-Pa. The mnemonic phrase is sa ri gu ma pa dha na. Its ārohaṇa-avarohaṇa structure (ascending and descending scale) is as follows (see swaras in Carnatic music for details on below notation and terms):

- ārohaṇa: S R₂ G₃ M₁ P D₁ N₁ Ṡ (Note: Alternate notations: Hindustani: S R G M P Ḏ D Ṡ; Western: C D E F G A♭ B C)
- avarohaṇa: Ṡ N₁ D₁ P M₁ G₃ R₂ S (Note: Alternate notations: Hindustani: Ṡ D Ḏ P M G R S; Western: C B A♭ G F E D C)

(the notes in this scale are chathusruthi rishabham, antara gandharam, shuddha madhyamam, shuddha dhaivatham, shuddha nishadham)

As it is a melakarta rāgam, by definition it is a sampoorna rāgam (has all seven notes in ascending and descending scale). It is the shuddha madhyamam equivalent of Kantamani, which is the 61st melakarta.
