= Nasikabhushani =

70th raga in the Melakarta

- Arohanam: S R₃ G₃ M₂ P D₂ N₂ Ṡ
- Avarohanam: Ṡ N₂ D₂ P M₂ G₃ R₃ S
- Equivalent: Hungarian major scale

Nasikabhushani (pronounced nāsikābhūshaṇi) is a rāgam in Carnatic music (musical scale of South Indian classical music). It is the 70th Melakarta rāgam in the 72 melakarta rāgam system of Carnatic music. It is called Nāsāmaṇi in Muthuswami Dikshitar school of Carnatic music.

== Structure and Lakshana ==
Nasikabhushani scale with shadjam at C

Nasikabhushani is the 4th rāgam in the 12th chakra Aditya. The mnemonic name is Aditya-Bhu. The mnemonic phrase is sa ru gu mi pa dhi ni. Nasikabhushani's ārohaṇa-avarohaṇa structure (ascending and descending scale) is as follows:

- ārohaṇa: S R₃ G₃ M₂ P D₂ N₂ Ṡ (Note: Alternate notations: Hindustani: S G̱ G M̄ P D Ṉ Ṡ; Western: C D♯ E F♯ G A B♭ C)
- avarohaṇa: Ṡ N₂ D₂ P M₂ G₃ R₃ S (Note: Alternate notations: Hindustani: Ṡ Ṉ D P M̄ G G̱ S; Western: C B♭ A G F♯ E D♯ C)

The notes used in this scale are shatsruthi rishabham, antara gandharam, prati madhyamam, chathusruthi dhaivatham, kaisiki nishadham. See swaras in Carnatic music for details on above notation and terms.

Nasikabhushani is a melakarta rāgam and hence by definition it is a sampoorna rāgam (that is, it has all seven notes in ascending and descending scale). It is the prati madhyamam equivalent of Vagadheeswari, which is the 34th melakarta rāgam.
