= Chitrambari =

Ragam in Carnatic music

- Arohanam: S R₂ G₃ M₂ P D₃ N₃ Ṡ
- Avarohanam: Ṡ N₃ D₃ P M₂ G₃ R₂ S

Chitrambari (pronounced chitrāmbari) is a ragam in Carnatic music (musical scale of South Indian classical music). It is the 66th Melakarta rāgam in the 72 melakarta rāgam system of Carnatic music. It is called Chaturangini in Muthuswami Dikshitar school of Carnatic music. It is the prati madhyamam equivalent of Naganandini, which is the 30th melakarta.

== Structure and Lakshana ==
Chitrambari scale with Shadjam at C

It is the 6th rāgam in the 11th chakra Rudra. The mnemonic name for this rāgam is Rudra-Sha. The mnemonic phrase is sa ra gu mi pa dhu nu. Its ārohaṇa-avarohaṇa structure (ascending and descending scale) is (see swaras in Carnatic music for details on below notation and terms):

- ārohaṇa: S R₂ G₃ M₂ P D₃ N₃ Ṡ (Note: Alternate notations: Hindustani: S R G M̄ P Ṉ N Ṡ; Western: C D E F♯ G A♯ B C)
- avarohaṇa: Ṡ N₃ D₃ P M₂ G₃ R₂ S (Note: Alternate notations: Hindustani: Ṡ N Ṉ P M̄ G R S; Western: C B A♯ G F♯ E D C)

(the notes in this scale are chathushruti rishabham, antara gandharam, prati madhyamam, shatshruti dhaivatam, kakali nishadam)

Since it is a melakarta rāgam, by definition it is a sampoorna rāgam (it has all 7 notes in ascending and descending scale).
