= Jhankaradhvani =

Nineteenth raga in the Melakarta

- Arohanam: S R₂ G₂ M₁ P D₁ N₁ Ṡ
- Avarohanam: Ṡ N₁ D₁ P M₁ G₂ R₂ S

Jhankaradhvani or Jhankaradhwani (pronounced jhankāradhvani) is a ragam in Carnatic music (musical scale of South Indian classical music). It is the 19th Melakarta rāgam in the 72 melakarta rāgam system of Carnatic music.

It is called Jhankārabhramari in the Muthuswami Dikshitar school of Carnatic music.

== Structure and Lakshana ==
Jhankaradhvani scale with shadjam at C

It is the 1st rāgam in the 4th chakra Veda. The mnemonic name is Veda-Pa. The mnemonic phrase is sa ri gi ma pa dha na. Its ārohaṇa-avarohaṇa structure (ascending and descending scale) is as follows (see swaras in Carnatic music for details on below notation and terms):

- ārohaṇa: S R₂ G₂ M₁ P D₁ N₁ Ṡ (Note: Alternate notations: Hindustani: S R G̱ M P Ḏ D Ṡ; Western: C D E♭ F G A♭ B C)
- avarohaṇa: Ṡ N₁ D₁ P M₁ G₂ R₂ S (Note: Alternate notations: Hindustani: Ṡ D Ḏ P M G̱ R S; Western: C B A♭ G F E♭ D C)

(the notes in this scale are chathusruthi rishabham, sadharana gandharam, shuddha madhyamam, shuddha dhaivatham, shuddha nishadham)

As it is a melakarta rāgam, by definition it is a sampoorna rāgam (has all seven notes in ascending and descending scale). It is the shuddha madhyamam equivalent of Shamalangi, which is the 55th melakarta.

== Asampurna Melakarta ==
Jhankārabhramari is the 19th Melakarta in the original list compiled by Venkatamakhin. The notes used in the scale are the same, but the zig-zag usage of notes in both ascending and descending scle (vakra prayoga) is the difference.

- ārohaṇa: S R₂ G₂ M₁ P D₁ N₁ D₁ P D₁ Ṡ (Note: Alternate notations: Hindustani: S R G̱ M P Ḏ D Ḏ P Ḏ Ṡ; Western: C D E♭ F G A♭ B A♭ G A♭ C)
- avarohaṇa: Ṡ N₁ D₁ P M₁ G₂ R₂ G₂ R₂ S (Note: Alternate notations: Hindustani: Ṡ D Ḏ P M G̱ R G̱ R S; Western: C B A♭ G F E♭ D E♭ D C)
