= Shubhapantuvarali =

45th raga in the Melakarta

- Arohanam: S R₁ G₂ M₂ P D₁ N₃ Ṡ
- Avarohanam: Ṡ N₃ D₁ P M₂ G₂ R₁ S

Shubhapantuvarali (pronounced śubhapantuvarāḻi, meaning the auspicious moon) is a rāgam in Carnatic music (musical scale of South Indian classical music). It is the 45th melakarta rāgam in the 72 melakarta rāgam system of Carnatic music. It is called Shivapantuvarāḻi in Muthuswami Dikshitar school of Carnatic music. Todi (thaat) is the equivalent in Hindustani music. Being sad in tone, it is usually used for sad songs by musicians.

== Structure and Lakshana ==
Shubhapantuvarali scale with shadjam at C

It is the 3rd rāgam in the 8th chakra Vasu. The mnemonic name is Vasu-Go. The mnemonic phrase is sa ra gi mi pa dha nu. Its ārohaṇa-avarohaṇa structure (ascending and descending scale) is as follows (see swaras in Carnatic music for details on below notation and terms):

- ārohaṇa: S R₁ G₂ M₂ P D₁ N₃ Ṡ (Note: Alternate notations: Hindustani: S Ṟ G̱ M̄ P Ḏ N Ṡ; Western: C D♭ E♭ F♯ G A♭ B C)
- avarohaṇa: Ṡ N₃ D₁ P M₂ G₂ R₁ S (Note: Alternate notations: Hindustani: Ṡ N Ḏ P M̄ G̱ Ṟ S; Western: C B A♭ G F♯ E♭ D♭ C)

This scale uses the notes shuddha rishabham, sadharana gandharam, prati madhyamam, shuddha dhaivatham and kakali nishadham. As it is a melakarta rāgam, by definition it is a sampoorna rāgam (has all seven notes in ascending and descending scale). It is the prati madhyamam equivalent of Dhenuka, which is the 9th melakarta scale.
