= Bhavapriya =

44th raga in the Melakarta

- Arohanam: S R₁ G₂ M₂ P D₁ N₂ Ṡ
- Avarohanam: Ṡ N₂ D₁ P M₂ G₂ R₁ S

Bhavapriya (meaning The one dear to Bhava (Shiva)) is a ragam (musical scale) in Carnatic music (South Indian classical music). It is the 44th Melakarta rāgam in the 72 melakarta rāgam system of Carnatic music.

It is called Bhavāni in Muthuswami Dikshitar school of Carnatic music.

== Structure and Lakshana ==
Bhavapriya scale with Shadjam at C

It is the 2nd rāgam in the 8th chakra Vasu. The mnemonic name is Vasu-Sri. The mnemonic phrase is sa ra gi mi pa dha ni. Its ārohaṇa-avarohaṇa structure (ascending and descending scale) is as follows (see swaras in Carnatic music for details on below notation and terms):

- ārohaṇa: S R₁ G₂ M₂ P D₁ N₂ Ṡ (Note: Alternate notations: Hindustani: S Ṟ G̱ M̄ P Ḏ Ṉ Ṡ; Western: C D♭ E♭ F♯ G A♭ B♭ C)
- avarohaṇa: Ṡ N₂ D₁ P M₂ G₂ R₁ S (Note: Alternate notations: Hindustani: Ṡ Ṉ Ḏ P M̄ G̱ Ṟ S; Western: C B♭ A♭ G F♯ E♭ D♭ C)

(shuddha rishabham, sadharana gandharam, prati madhyamam, shuddha dhaivatham, kaisiki nishadham)

As it is a melakarta rāgam, by definition it is a sampoorna rāgam (has all seven notes in ascending and descending scale). It is the prati madhyamam equivalent of Hanumatodi (also known as Todi), which is the 8th melakarta.
