= Dhatuvardhani =

69th raga in the Melakarta

- Arohanam: S R₃ G₃ M₂ P D₁ N₃ Ṡ
- Avarohanam: Ṡ N₃ D₁ P M₂ G₃ R₃ S

Dhatuvardhani (pronounced Dhātuvardhani) is a ragam in Carnatic music (musical scale of South Indian classical music). Dhatuvardhani is the 69th Melakarta rāgam in the 72 melakarta rāgam system of Carnatic music. It is called Dhautapanchamam in Muthuswami Dikshitar school of Carnatic music.

== Structure and Lakshana ==
Dhatuvardhani scale with Shadjam at C

Dhatuvardhani is the 3rd rāgam in the 12th chakra Aditya. The mnemonic name is Aditya-Go. The mnemonic phrase is sa ru gu mi pa dha nu. Dhatuvardhani's ārohaṇa-avarohaṇa structure (ascending and descending scale) is as follows (see swaras in Carnatic music for details on below notation and terms):

- ārohaṇa: S R₃ G₃ M₂ P D₁ N₃ Ṡ (Note: Alternate notations: Hindustani: S G̱ G M̄ P Ḏ N Ṡ; Western: C D♯ E F♯ G A♭ B C)
- avarohaṇa: Ṡ N₃ D₁ P M₂ G₃ R₃ S (Note: Alternate notations: Hindustani: Ṡ N Ḏ P M̄ G G̱ S; Western: C B A♭ G F♯ E D♯ C)

The notes used in this scale are shatsruthi rishabham, antara gandharam, prati madhyamam, shuddha dhaivatham and kakali nishadham.

As Dhatuvardhani is a melakarta rāgam, by definition it is a sampurna rāgam (it has all 7 notes in ascending and descending scale). It is the prati madhyamam equivalent of Gangeyabhushani, which is the 33rd melakarta.
