= Ratnangi =

Second raga in the Melakarta

- Arohanam: S R₁ G₁ M₁ P D₁ N₂ Ṡ
- Avarohanam: Ṡ N₂ D₁ P M₁ G₁ R₁ S

Ratnangi (pronounced ratnāngi, meaning the one with a gem-like body) is a rāgam in Carnatic music (musical scale of South Indian classical music). It is the 2nd melakarta rāgam (parent scale) in the 72 melakarta rāgam system of Carnatic music. It is called Phenadhyuti in Muthuswami Dikshitar school of Carnatic music.

== Structure and Lakshana ==
Ratnangi scale with shadjam at C

It is the 2nd rāgam in the 1st chakra Indu. The mnemonic name is Indu-Sri. The mnemonic phrase is sa ri ga ma pa dha ni. Its ārohaṇa-avarohaṇa structure (ascending and descending scale) is as follows (see swaras in Carnatic music for details on below notation and terms):

- ārohaṇa: S R₁ G₁ M₁ P D₁ N₂ Ṡ (Note: Alternate notations: Hindustani: S Ṟ R M P Ḏ Ṉ Ṡ; Western: C D♭ E F G A♭ B♭ C)
- avarohaṇa: Ṡ N₂ D₁ P M₁ G₁ R₁ S (Note: Alternate notations: Hindustani: Ṡ Ṉ Ḏ P M R Ṟ S; Western: C B♭ A♭ G F E D♭ C)

The scale uses the notes shuddha rishabham, shuddha gandharam, shuddha madhyamam, shuddha dhaivatham and kaisiki nishadham. As it is a melakarta rāgam, by definition it is a sampoorna rāgam (has all seven notes in ascending and descending scale). It is the shuddha madhyamam equivalent of Jalārnavam, which is the 38th melakarta scale.

== Asampurna Melakarta ==
Phenadhyuti is the 2nd Melakarta in the original list compiled by Venkatamakhin. The notes used in the scale are the same, but the ascending scale is different.

- ārohaṇa: S R₁ M₁ P D₁ P N₂ Ṡ (Note: Alternate notations: Hindustani: S Ṟ M P Ḏ P Ṉ Ṡ; Western: C D♭ F G A♭ G B♭ C)
- avarohaṇa: Ṡ N₂ D₁ P M₁ G₁ R₁ S (Note: Alternate notations: Hindustani: Ṡ Ṉ Ḏ P M R Ṟ S; Western: C B♭ A♭ G F E D♭ C)
