= Hatakambari =

Eighteenth raga in the Melakarta

- Arohanam: S R₁ G₃ M₁ P D₃ N₃ Ṡ
- Avarohanam: Ṡ N₃ D₃ P M₁ G₃ R₁ S

Hatakambari (pronounced Hātakāmbari) is a ragam in Carnatic music (musical scale of South Indian classical music). It is the 18th Melakarta rāgam in the 72 melakarta rāgam system of Carnatic music.

It is called Jayashuddhamālavi in Muthuswami Dikshitar school of Carnatic music.

== Structure and Lakshana ==
Hatakambari scale with Shadjam at C

It is the 6th rāgam in the 3rd chakra Agni. The mnemonic name is Agni-Sha. The mnemonic phrase is sa ra gu ma pa dhu nu. Its ārohaṇa-avarohaṇa structure (ascending and descending scale) is as follows (see swaras in Carnatic music for details on below notation and terms):

- ārohaṇa: S R₁ G₃ M₁ P D₃ N₃ Ṡ (Note: Alternate notations: Hindustani: S Ṟ G M P Ṉ N Ṡ; Western: C D♭ E F G A♯ B C)
- avarohaṇa: Ṡ N₃ D₃ P M₁ G₃ R₁ S (Note: Alternate notations: Hindustani: Ṡ N Ṉ P M G Ṟ S; Western: C B A♯ G F E D♭ C)

(the notes used in this scale are shuddha rishabham, antara gandharam, shuddha madhyamam, shatsruthi dhaivatham, kakali nishadham)

As it is a melakarta rāgam, by definition it is a sampoorna rāgam (has all seven notes in ascending and descending scale). It is the shuddha madhyamam equivalent of Vishwambari, which is the 54th melakarta.

== Asampurna Melakarta ==
Jayashuddhamālavi is the 18th Melakarta in the original list compiled by Venkatamakhin. The notes used in the scale are the same, but the scales are different. It is an shadava-sampurna raga (6 notes in ascending scale, while full 7 are used in descending scale in zig-zag manner, vakra prayoga).

- ārohaṇa: S R₁ G₃ M₁ P N₃ Ṡ (Note: Alternate notations: Hindustani: S Ṟ G M P N Ṡ; Western: C D♭ E F G B C)
- avarohaṇa: Ṡ N₃ D₃ N₃ P M₁ G₃ R₁ S (Note: Alternate notations: Hindustani: Ṡ N Ṉ N P M G Ṟ S; Western: C B A♯ B G F E D♭ C)
