= Rishabhapriya =

Musical scale of South Indian classical music

- Arohanam: S R₂ G₃ M₂ P D₁ N₂ Ṡ
- Avarohanam: Ṡ N₂ D₁ P M₂ G₃ R₂ S

Rishabhapriya is a ragam in Carnatic music (musical scale of South Indian classical music). It is the 62nd melakarta rāgam (parent scale) in the 72 melakarta rāgam system of Carnatic music. It is the prati madhyamam equivalent of Charukesi, which is the 26th melakarta. It is called Ratipriya in Muthuswami Dikshitar school of Carnatic music.

== Structure and Lakshana ==
Rishabhapriya scale with shadjam at C

It is the 2nd rāgam in the 11th chakra Rudra. The mnemonic name is Rudra-Sri. The mnemonic phrase is sa ri gu mi pa dha ni. Its ārohaṇa-avarohaṇa structure (ascending and descending scale) is as follows (see swaras in Carnatic music for details on below notation and terms):

- ārohaṇa: S R₂ G₃ M₂ P D₁ N₂ Ṡ (Note: Alternate notations: Hindustani: S R G M̄ P Ḏ Ṉ Ṡ; Western: C D E F♯ G A♭ B♭ C)
- avarohaṇa: Ṡ N₂ D₁ P M₂ G₃ R₂ S (Note: Alternate notations: Hindustani: Ṡ Ṉ Ḏ P M̄ G R S; Western: C B♭ A♭ G F♯ E D C)

This scale uses the notes chathusruthi rishabham, antara gandharam, prati madhyamam, shuddha dhaivatham and kaisiki nishadham. As it is a melakarta rāgam, by definition it is a sampoorna rāgam (has all seven notes in ascending and descending scale).
