= Dhenuka (raga) =

Ninth raga in the Melakarta

- Arohanam: S R₁ G₂ M₁ P D₁ N₃ Ṡ
- Avarohanam: Ṡ N₃ D₁ P M₁ G₂ R₁ S
- Equivalent: Neapolitan minor scale

Dhenuka (pronounced dhēnukā) is a rāgam (musical scale) in Carnatic music. It is the 9th Melakarta rāgam in the 72 melakarta rāgam system of Carnatic music.

It is called Dhunibinnashadjam in Muthuswami Dikshitar school of Carnatic music.

== Structure and Lakshana ==
Dhenuka scale with Shadjam at C

It is the 3rd rāgam in the 2nd chakra Netra. The mnemonic name is Netra-Go. The mnemonic phrase is sa ri ga ma pa dha ni. Its ārohaṇa-avarohaṇa structure (ascending and descending scale) is as follows (see swaras in Carnatic music for details on below notation and terms):

- ārohaṇa: S R₁ G₂ M₁ P D₁ N₃ Ṡ (Note: Alternate notations: Hindustani: S Ṟ G̱ M P Ḏ N Ṡ; Western: C D♭ E♭ F G A♭ B C)
- avarohaṇa: Ṡ N₃ D₁ P M₁ G₂ R₁ S (Note: Alternate notations: Hindustani: Ṡ N Ḏ P M G̱ Ṟ S; Western: C B A♭ G F E♭ D♭ C)

(Suddha Rishabham, Sadharana Gandharam, Suddha Madhyamam, Suddha Dhaivatham, Kakali Nishadham)

As it is a melakarta rāgam, by definition it is a sampoorna rāgam (has all seven notes in ascending and descending scale). It is the Suddha madhyamam equivalent of Shubhapantuvarali, which is the 45th melakarta.

== Asampurna Melakarta ==
Dhunibinnashadjam is the 9th Melakarta in the original list compiled by Venkatamakhin. The notes used in the scale are the same as Dhenuka.

== Janya Rāgams ==
Dhenuka has a few janya rāgams (derived scales) associated with it. See List of Janya Rāgams for full list of rāgams associated with Dhenuka.
