= Vachaspati (raga) =

Rāgam in Carnatic music

- Arohanam: S R₂ G₃ M₂ P D₂ N₂ Ṡ
- Avarohanam: Ṡ N₂ D₂ P M₂ G₃ R₂ S
- Equivalent: Acoustic scale

Vachaspati (pronounced Vāchaspati, meaning Lord of speech) is a rāgam in Carnatic music (musical scale of South Indian classical music). It is the 64th melakarta rāgam in the 72 melakarta rāgam system. It is known as Bhushāvati according to the Muthuswami Dikshitar school. It was borrowed into Hindustani music, like many other ragas from Carnatic rāgams.

== Structure and Lakshana ==
Vachaspati scale with shadjam at C

It is the 4th rāgam in the 11th chakra Rudra. The mnemonic name is Rudra-Bhu. The mnemonic phrase is sa ri gu mi pa dhi ni. Its ārohaṇa-avarohaṇa structure (ascending and descending scale) is as follows (see swaras in Carnatic music for details on below notation and terms):

- ārohaṇa: S R₂ G₃ M₂ P D₂ N₂ Ṡ (Note: Alternate notations: Hindustani: S R G M̄ P D Ṉ Ṡ; Western: C D E F♯ G A B♭ C)
- avarohaṇa: Ṡ N₂ D₂ P M₂ G₃ R₂ S (Note: Alternate notations: Hindustani: Ṡ Ṉ D P M̄ G R S; Western: C B♭ A G F♯ E D C)

This scales uses the notes chathusruthi rishabham, antara gandharam, prati madhyamam, chathusruthi dhaivatham and kaisiki nishadham. It is a sampoorna rāgam - a rāgam that has all seven swaras (notes). It is the prati madhyamam equivalent of Harikambhoji, which is the 28th melakarta scale.

== Janya rāgams ==
It has many janya rāgams (derived scales) associated with it, out of which Bhooshavali and Saraswathi are popular. See List of janya rāgams for all scales associated with Vachaspati.
