= Vakulabharanam =

Fourteenth raga in the Melakarta

- Arohanam: S R₁ G₃ M₁ P D₁ N₂ Ṡ
- Avarohanam: Ṡ N₂ D₁ P M₁ G₃ R₁ S
- Equivalent: Phrygian dominant scale

Vakulabharanam (pronounced vakuḷābharaṇam) is a rāgam in Carnatic music (musical scale of South Indian classical music). It is the 14th melakarta rāgam in the 72 melakarta rāgam system of Carnatic music. It is called Dhātivasantabhairavi or Vātivasantabhairavi in Muthuswami Dikshitar school of Carnatic music. Hindustani equivalent of this ragam is raga basant mukhari

== Structure and Lakshana ==
Vakulabharanam scale with shadjam at C

It is the 2nd rāgam in the 3rd chakra Agni. The mnemonic name is Agni-Sri. The mnemonic phrase is sa ri ga ma pa dha ni. Its ārohaṇa-avarohaṇa structure (ascending and descending scale) is as follows (see swaras in Carnatic music for details on below notation and terms):

- ārohaṇa: S R₁ G₃ M₁ P D₁ N₂ Ṡ (Note: Alternate notations: Hindustani: S Ṟ G M P Ḏ Ṉ Ṡ; Western: C D♭ E F G A♭ B♭ C)
- avarohaṇa: Ṡ N₂ D₁ P M₁ G₃ R₁ S (Note: Alternate notations: Hindustani: Ṡ Ṉ Ḏ P M G Ṟ S; Western: C B♭ A♭ G F E D♭ C)

Shuddha rishabham, antara gandharam, shuddha madhyamam, shuddha dhaivatham and kaisiki nishadham are the swaras used in this scale. As this scale is a melakarta rāgam, by definition it is a sampoorna rāgam (has all seven notes in ascending and descending scale). It is the shuddha madhyamam equivalent of Nāmanārāyaṇi, which is the 50th melakarta scale.

== Asampurna Melakarta ==
Vātivasantabhairavi is the 14th Melakarta in the original list compiled by Venkatamakhin. The notes used in the scale are the same, but the descending scale has notes used in zig-zag manner (vakra prayoga).

- ārohaṇa: S R₁ G₃ M₁ P D₁ N₂ Ṡ (Note: Alternate notations: Hindustani: S Ṟ G M P Ḏ Ṉ Ṡ; Western: C D♭ E F G A♭ B♭ C)
- avarohaṇa: Ṡ N₂ D₁ M₁ G₃ M₁ P M₁ G₃ R₁ S (Note: Alternate notations: Hindustani: Ṡ Ṉ Ḏ M G M P M G Ṟ S; Western: C B♭ A♭ F E F G F E D♭ C)
