= Kosalam =

71st raga in the Melakarta

- Arohanam: S R₃ G₃ M₂ P D₂ N₃ Ṡ
- Avarohanam: Ṡ N₃ D₂ P M₂ G₃ R₃ S
- Equivalent: Lydian #2 scale

Kosalam (pronounced kōsalam) is a ragam in Carnatic music (musical scale of South Indian classical music). It is the 71st Melakarta rāgam in the 72 melakarta rāgam system of Carnatic music and is the prati madhyamam equivalent of Shoolini, which is the 35th melakarta. It is called Kusumākaram in Muthuswami Dikshitar school of Carnatic music.

== Structure and Lakshana ==
Kosalam scale with shadjam at C

Kosalam is the 5th rāgam in the 12th chakra Aditya. The mnemonic name is Aditya-Ma. The mnemonic phrase is sa ru gu mi pa dhi nu. Its ārohaṇa-avarohaṇa structure (ascending and descending scale) is as follows (see swaras in Carnatic music for details on below notation and terms):

- ārohaṇa: S R₃ G₃ M₂ P D₂ N₃ Ṡ (Note: Alternate notations: Hindustani: S G̱ G M̄ P D N Ṡ; Western: C D♯ E F♯ G A B C)
- avarohaṇa: Ṡ N₃ D₂ P M₂ G₃ R₃ S (Note: Alternate notations: Hindustani: Ṡ N D P M̄ G G̱ S; Western: C B A G F♯ E D♯ C)

(the scale's notes are shatsruthi rishabham, antara gandharam, prati madhyamam, chathusruthi dhaivatham, kakali nishadham)

Kosalam is a melakarta rāgam and hence, by definition, it is a sampoorna rāgam (it has all seven notes in ascending and descending scale).
