= Gayakapriya =

Thirteenth raga in the Melakarta

- Arohanam: S R₁ G₃ M₁ P D₁ N₁ Ṡ
- Avarohanam: Ṡ N₁ D₁ P M₁ G₃ R₁ S

Gayakapriya (pronounced gāyakapriya) is a ragam in Carnatic music (musical scale of South Indian classical music). It is the 13th Melakarta rāgam in the 72 melakarta rāgam system of Carnatic music.

It is called Geyahejjujji in Muthuswami Dikshitar school of Carnatic music.

== Structure and Lakshana ==
Gayakapriya scale with Shadjam at C

It is the 1st rāgam in the 3rd chakra Agni. The mnemonic name is Agni-Pa. The mnemonic phrase is sa ra gu ma pa dha na. Its ārohaṇa-avarohaṇa structure (ascending and descending scale) is as follows (see swaras in Carnatic music for details on below notation and terms):

- ārohaṇa: S R₁ G₃ M₁ P D₁ N₁ Ṡ (Note: Alternate notations: Hindustani: S Ṟ G M P Ḏ D Ṡ; Western: C D♭ E F G A♭ B C)
- avarohaṇa: Ṡ N₁ D₁ P M₁ G₃ R₁ S (Note: Alternate notations: Hindustani: Ṡ D Ḏ P M G Ṟ S; Western: C B A♭ G F E D♭ C)

(the notes used in this scale are shuddha rishabham, antara gandharam, shuddha madhyamam, shuddha dhaivatham, shuddha nishadham)

As it is a melakarta rāgam, by definition it is a sampoorna rāgam (has all seven notes in ascending and descending scale). It is the shuddha madhyamam equivalent of Dhavalambari, which is the 49th melakarta.

== Asampurna Melakarta ==
Geyahejjujji is the 13th Melakarta in the original list compiled by Venkatamakhin. The notes used in the scale are the same, but the ascending scale is different and vakra (zig-zag usage of notes in phrases of the scale). It is an shadava-sampurna raga (6 notes in ascending scale, while full 7 are used in descending scale).

- ārohaṇa: S R₁ M₁ G₃ M₁ P D₁ Ṡ (Note: Alternate notations: Hindustani: S Ṟ M G M P Ḏ Ṡ; Western: C D♭ F E F G A♭ C)
- avarohaṇa: Ṡ N₁ D₁ P M₁ G₃ R₁ S (Note: Alternate notations: Hindustani: Ṡ D Ḏ P M G Ṟ S; Western: C B A♭ G F E D♭ C)
