= Sampurna raga =

In Indian classical music, Sampūrṇa rāgas (संपूर्ण, Sanskrit for 'complete', also spelt as sampoorna) have all seven swaras in their scale. In general, the swaras in the Arohana and Avarohana strictly follow the ascending and descending scale as well. That is, they do not have vakra swara phrases (वक्र, meaning 'crooked').

In Carnatic music, the Melakarta ragas are all sampurna ragas, but the converse is not true, i.e., all sampurna ragas are not Melakarta ragas. An example is Bhairavi raga in Carnatic music (different from the Bhairavi of Hindustani music). Some examples of Melakarta ragas are Mayamalavagowla, Todi, Sankarabharanam and Kharaharapriya.
