= Arohana =

Ascending scale of a raga

Arohana, arohanam, aroh or aroha, in the context of Indian classical music, is the ascending scale of notes in a raga. The pitch increases as we go up from Shadja (Sa) to the Taar Shadja (Sa), possibly in a crooked (vakra) manner.

It contrasts with an avarohana, avarohanam or avaroha the descending scale of any raga. The notes descend in pitch from the upper tonic (taar shadja or Sa) down to the lower tonic, possibly in a crooked (vakra) manner.

== Scale ==
In Hindustani classical music, the ascending scale's notes are S R G M P D and N. Lower forms of notes are written in lower case, like r g m d n (S and P are fixed notes), while the first scale given above is that of higher form of the notes. The English notes C D E F G A and B correspond to S R G M P D and N, when C is taken as the tonal note (S is sung at C).

In Carnatic music, the ascending scale's notes for the variant notes R G M D and N have a subscript number indicating the specific variant (see examples below).

== Examples ==
=== For arohana ===
In Multani, the aroha is 'N S g M P N S' (lowercase notes are the lower forms, while uppercase notes are the higher forms, and an apostrophe preceding or following a note denotes the lower or higher octave respectively – see swara).

In Sankarabharanam ragam (29th Melakarta in 72 parent ragam scheme of Carnatic music) the Arohana is S R2 G3 M1 P D2 N3 S. See swaras in Carnatic music for explanation of notation.

In Abhogi ragam, which is a janya ragam of 22nd melakarta Kharaharapriya, the Arohana is S R2 G2 M1 D2 S. In this ragam certain notes are excluded so the raga is totally changed.

=== For avarohana ===
In raga Darbari, an Asavari-thaat raga with vadi-samvadi R-P, the avroha is R' n S' d~ n P, m P g~ m R S, with andolan on the dhaivat and gandhar.

In Malahari, which is janya raga of 15th melakarta Mayamalavagowla, the avarohana is S D1 P M1 G2 R1 S. See swaras in Carnatic music for description of this notation.

In Sahana, a janya raga of 28th melakarta Harikambhoji, the Avarohana is S N2 D2 P M1 G3 M1 R2 G3 R2 S. This raga in its avarohana has the notes jumping from one to another (a bit like Dattu). This changes the whole feel of the raga, making Sahana a beautiful raga to listen to.
