= Vishnu Narayan Bhatkhande =

Indian musicologist, music theorist and scholar (1860-1936)

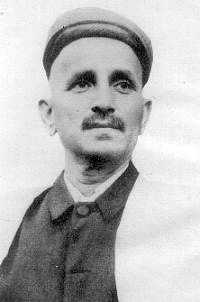

Background information
- Born: 10 August 1860; Bombay, India
- Origin: India
- Died: 19 September 1936 (aged 76) Bombay, India
- Genres: Hindustani classical; Mewati Gharana
- Years active: 1875–1935

Vishnu Narayan Bhatkhande (10 August 1860 – 19 September 1936) was an Indian musicologist, music theorist and scholar of Hindustani classical music. He played a major role in systematizing the study and teaching of Hindustani music in the early 20th century. Drawing on both historical Sanskrit treatises and his study of contemporary musicians, he developed a system for classifying Hindustani ragas into ten thaats, devised a widely used system of musical notation, documented compositions from different musical traditions, and produced influential theoretical and pedagogical works.

== Early life ==
Vishnu Narayan Bhatkhande was born on 10 August 1860 in Walkeshwar, Bombay.

Bhatkhande was exposed to music at home through his mother's singing and his father's amateur playing of the swarmandal. While not a professional musician, his father, Narayanrao Bhatkhande, guided Vishnu Narayan and his siblings to receive classical music training. During his school years, he sang devotional and folk songs, participated in poetry recitations, and learned to play the bansuri. After turning fifteen, he began studying the sitar and subsequently began studying Sanskrit texts that dealt with music theory with Vallabhdas Damulji and Gopal Giri.

Bhatkhande attended Elphinstone High School and Elphinstone College in Bombay, as well as Deccan College in Pune for about a year, graduating with a B.A. in 1885 He subsequently earned his LL.B. (law) degree from Bombay University in 1887 and practiced law in both Karachi and in Bombay.

In 1884, Bhatkhande became a member of Gayan Uttejak Mandali, a music appreciation society in Bombay, which broadened his experience with music performance and teaching. He studied at the Mandali for six years and learned a variety of compositions in both khayal and dhrupad forms under musicians such as Shri Raojibua Belbagkar and Ustad Ali Hussain.

After the death of his wife in 1900 and his daughter in 1903, Bhatkhande abandoned his law practice and fully dedicated his time to music.

== Career ==
Bhatkhande studied musicological literature in Sanskrit, Gujarati, Marathi, Hindi, Bengali, Telugu, and Tamil which led him to question the Hindustani classical music that was performed at his time. This concern inspired his research journey into Hindustani classical music.

=== Research travels and fieldwork ===
Bhatkhande traveled throughout India, meeting with experts, also known as ustads and pandits, and researching music. He began the study of ancient texts such as the Natya Shastra and Sangeet Ratnakara.

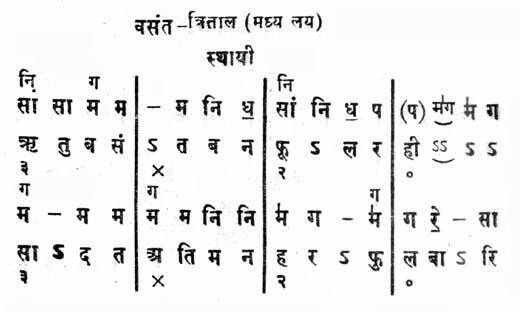
Music notations developed by Bhatkhande

In 1904, Bhatkhande traveled throughout western and southern India, including Gujarat, Kutch, Madras, Tanjore, Madurai, Ettayapuram, Rameshwaram, Mysore and Bangalore. With the help of local contacts, he began to familiarise himself with the world of Carnatic music. He established contact with stalwarts such as Tiruvottriyur Tyagayyar and Tachur Singaracharya in Madras, Poochi Srinivasa Iyengar in Ramanathapuram and Subbarama Dikshitar in Ettayapuram but the language barrier made these interactions less fruitful than he expected. Notes from a journal maintained of his time there were later published as Meri Dakshin Bharat Ki Sangeet Yatra (My Musical Journey in Southern India).

While his conversations with exponents of Carnatic music weren't very successful, Bhatkhande procured two valuable manuscripts on the art: the Chaturdandiprakashika by Venkatamakhin and the Svaramelakalanidhi of Ramamatya, both treatises that sought to classify ragas. The two works along with others and his observations from his travels in North India enabled Bhatkhande to classify Hindustani ragas using a system of ten, much like the melakartas of the Carnatic style.

Later, in 1907, Bhatkhande journeyed through and studied central and eastern India and in northern India between 1908-1909. He visited Nagpur, Calcutta, Puri, Hyderabad, Jabalpur, Allahabad, Banaras, Gaya, Mathura, Agra, Lucknow, Delhi, Jaipur, Bikaner, Jodhpur and Udaipur.

He used a comparative methodology, collecting and comparing compositions by individual musicians of the same repertoire. In Bombay, he collected over 300 khayal compositions from Muhammad Ali Khan and Ashiq Ali Khan. While at Rampur he studied with Wazir Khan, a direct descendant of Tansen, and worked with musicians associated with the court of Nawab Hamid Ali Khan. He also investigated musical traditions in Gwalior and other centers.

Bhatkhande continued this work after his principal research tours, including visits to princely states and music institutions. In 1928, he organized a workshop at Hardwar where musicians compared and discussed different versions of compositions in an effort to reconcile variants before publication.

=== Systematization of the thaat system ===
One of Bhatkhande's most important contributions was his classification of Hindustani ragas through the thaat system. He rejected the older raga–ragini–putra approach, which associated ragas with personified male and female figures because he considered it unsuitable as a systematic classification of the contemporary system.

His research in South India influenced his thinking about musical classification. The organizational principles he encountered in the South Indian tradition (Karnatik) provided a model for arranging musical material systematically, although Bhatkhande adapted this approach to the requirements and aesthetics of Hindustani music.

Bhatkhande defined a thaat as a seven-note scalar arrangement in ascending order beginning with Sa. Although twelve-note pitch material theoretically permits a larger number of seven-note combinations, he selected ten thaats that he considered sufficient for classifying the principal body of Hindustani ragas in contemporary practice.

The ten thaats are Bilawal, Kalyan, Khamaj, Bhairav, Poorvi, Marva, Kafi, Asavari, Bhairavi, and Todi.

The thaat was established as a classificatory framework rather than as a melodic form performed as a raga. Individual ragas could be associated with a thaat according to their underlying pitch material, while their identity depended on additional characteristics such as ascent (arohana) and descent (avaroha), principal (vadi) and secondary (samvadi) notes, characteristic phrases (pakad) and melodic movement (chalan).

Bhatkhande's classifications were based on contemporary practice and on comparisons between different musical traditions and gharana variants. Some musicians objected that assigning a large and varied repertoire to a limited number of thaats could oversimplify distinctions between ragas. Nevertheless, the system became an important framework for general education and discussion of Hindustani music.

=== Major works and publications ===
Bhatkhande's main writings combined music theory, historical research, raga classification, notation and collections of compositions.

His early theoretical work included the Shri Mallakshaya Sangeetam published under the name Chaturpandit. He later published the four-volume Hindustani Sangeet Paddhati, written in Marathi in the form of a teacher–student dialogue. The work discussed musical theory, historical sources, raga structures and other aspects of Hindustani music and is still used to teach students today.

Bhatkhande also composed Lakshan Geetas, which presented the characteristics of ragas in song form. These works provided students with a practical and memorable way to associate theoretical descriptions with musical examples.

To complement his theoretical works, Bhatkhande published Swar Malika, a compilation of rhythmic solfège exercises (sargams) which also contained detailed descriptions of some ragas.

His most extensive collection was the six-volume Kramik Pustak Malika, published between 1919 and 1937. The series presented a graded sequence of musical material using Bhatkhande's notation system and included more than 2,000 traditional compositions together with approximately 300 Lakshan Geetas and other supplemental teaching material.

The Kramik Pustak Malika was organized for progressive study, with the earlier volumes intended for students beginning their study and later volumes dealing with a broader and more advanced concepts. The final two volumes appeared after Bhatkhande's death and were prepared for publication by his successors.

Bhatkhande also published historical and theoretical works including A Short Historical Survey of the Music of Upper India, Abhinava Raga Manjari and works dealing with rhythm (tala). He also edited or prepared editions of earlier Sanskrit musicological texts.

Bhatkhande sometimes published his works under the pseudonyms, Vishnu Sharma and Chaturpandit.

His disciple S N Ratanjankar, famous musician Dilipkumar Roy, Ratanjankar's disciple K. G. Ginde, S.C.R. Bhatt, Ram Ashrey Jha 'Ramrang', Sumati Mutatkar and Krishna Kumar Kapoor are among the notable scholars who were influenced by Bhatkhande. His notation system became standard, and though later scholars like Pandit V. D. Paluskar, Pandit Vinayakrao Patwardhan and Pandit Omkarnath Thakur introduced their improved versions, it remained a publisher's favorite. It suffered a setback with the onset of desktop publishing, which found inserting marks above and below Devanagari text cumbersome; as a result, books carrying compositions yielded to theoretical texts. A recently developed notation system, Ome Swarlipi, follows the logical structure introduced by Bhatkhande but uses symbols instead of Devanagari alphabets.

=== Music conferences ===
Bhatkhande valued discussion and cooperation between musicians and musicologists as an important pillar in developing Hindustani music theory. He believed that differences between musical traditions and gharanas should be examined through collective discussion rather than remaining solely within individual lineages.

The first All-India Music Conference was held at Baroda in March 1916 under the patronage of Maharaja Sayajirao Gaekwad III. Bhatkhande served as the general secretary of its working committee. Additional conferences were held in Delhi in 1918, Banaras in 1919, and Lucknow in 1924 and 1925.

These meetings included discussions of raga classification, differences in musical practice, and the organization of music education. They provided a forum in which musicians and scholars could compare practices that had previously been transmitted through separate traditions.

=== Music education and institutions ===
Bhatkhande sought to expand music education through organized courses, textbooks, notation and teacher training while emphasizing practical teacher-student instruction as an essential part of musical training.

In 1915, he was invited by Sayajirao Gaekwad III to reorganize the Baroda State Music School. The institution incorporated systematic instruction in music theory and notation, together with a guided approach to musical study.

In Gwalior, Bhatkhande was invited by Maharaja Madhavrao Scindia to help organize the Madhav Sangeet Mahavidyalaya, which opened in 1918. Several court musicians were sent to Bombay to study his methods, including notation, theoretical classification and classroom teaching, before returning to Gwalior.

He also participated in workshops to train teachers in Bombay, where music teachers learned how to use use his notational system and practice classroom discussions. His approach was consequently not limited to teaching individual performers, but included methods for preparing teachers to instruct larger groups of students.

In 1926, Bhatkhande helped establish the Marris College of Music in Lucknow with the support of Rai Umanath Bali and Raja Nawab Ali Khan and under the patronage of Governor Sir William Marris. The institution adopted a structured curriculum and used Bhatkhande's textbooks as part of its instructional program. The college was later renamed Bhatkhande College of Hindustani Music and is now known as Bhatkhande Sanskriti Vishwavidyalaya.

By the late 1920s, Bhatkhande reported that his books were being used at several music institutions and universities, including institutions in Banaras, Gwalior, Nagpur and Baroda, as well as at the Hindu Women's University and in numerous Bombay schools.

Although his educational work made theoretical knowledge and basic musical literacy accessible outside hereditary gharana structures, practical performance skills continued to depend heavily on direct instruction from traditional teachers.

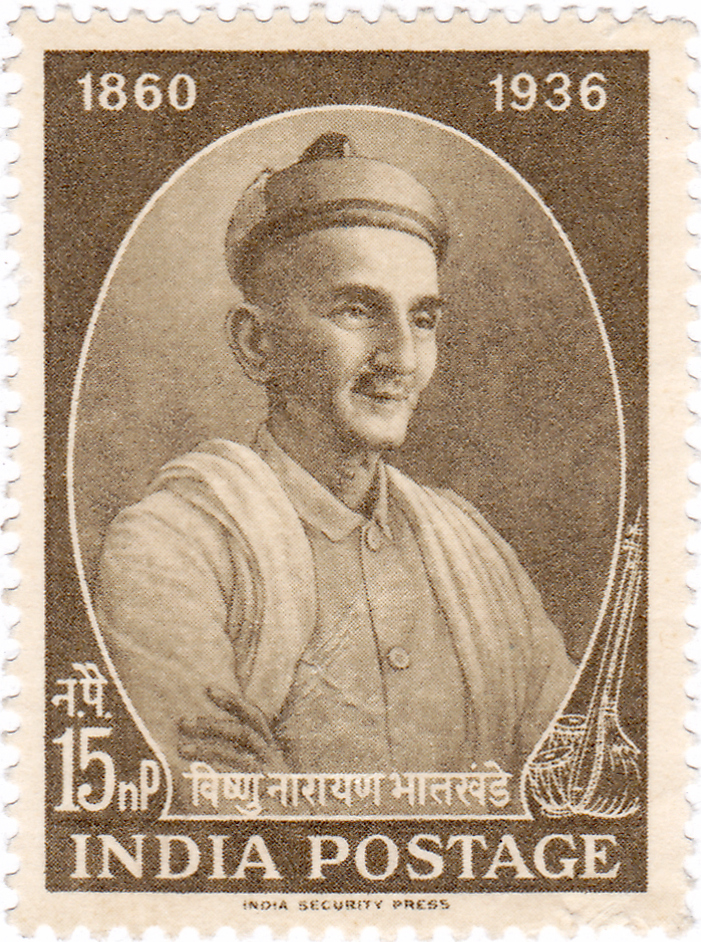
Bhatkhande on a 1961 stamp of India

== Personal life and final years ==
Bhatkhande married Madhubai and had a daughter named Sitabai. Both his wife and daughter died during the early years of the 20th century, although sources differ on the precise dates.

His legal career provided him with financial independence, allowing him to devote increasing amounts of time to musical research. His musical activities expanded considerably around the beginning of the 20th century, and he undertook his major research journeys from 1904 onward. He formally retired from legal practice in 1910 and completely devoted himself to his musicological work.

During the final decade of his life, Bhatkhande remained involved in the development of music education and continued to evaluate and advise institutions. He made his final visit to Lucknow in 1933.

After returning to Bombay in 1933, Bhatkhande suffered a paralytic stroke and became increasingly weak. He died on 19 September 1936, in Walkeshwar, Bombay at the age of 76.

The final two volumes of the Kramik Pustak Malika were published posthumously in 1937. The Marris College of Music was renamed Bhatkhande Sangeet Vidyapeeth in 1947, and the Government of India issued a commemorative postage stamp bearing Bhatkhande's image in 1961.

== Bibliography ==
1. Shrimallakshya-sangeetam – A treatise, in Sanskrit, on the theory of music in slokas and describing the important ragas. (Lakshya=current)
2. Lakshan Geet Sangrah in three parts. Compositions descriptive of the Ragas, giving their characteristics in songs composed by Pandit Bhatkhande.
3. Hindustani Sangeet Paddhati in 4 parts – A commentary on the Lakshya Sangeetam in Marathi. It is a detailed study and discussion of the theory of music and explanation of 150 Ragas of Hindustani music. This important work has been translated into Hindi.
4. Kramik Pustak Malika – This book was published in six parts. It is a detailed textbook of Hindustani music, describing all the important Ragas, their theory and illustrated with well-known compositions in notations. It contains about 1,200 such compositions.
5. Swara Malika (in Gujarati characters) Notation of Ragas in swara and tala.
6. A Comparative Study of the Music Systems of the 15th, 16th, 17th and 18th Centuries (in English).
7. Historical Survey of the Music of India.
8. Geet Malika – which was originally published in 23 monthly issues, each containing 25 to 30 classical compositions of Hindustani Sangeet in notation.
9. Abhinav Raga Manjari – A treatise on the Ragas of Hindustani music, each being described briefly in one sloka in Sanskrit.
10. Abhinav Tala Manjari – A textbook in Sanskrit on the Talas

== Manuscripts edited by Bhatkhande ==
1. Swara Mela Kalanidhi by Ramamatya
2. Chaturdandi Prakashika by Venkatamakhin
3. Raga Lakshanam
4. Raga Tarangini by Lochan
5. Raga Tatva Vibodh by Shriniwas
6. Sadraga Chandrodaya by Pundarik Vithal
7. Raga Manjari by Pundarik Vithal
8. Raga Mala by Pundarik Vithal
9. Nartan Niranaya by Kashinath Shashtri Appa Tulsi
10. Sangeet Sudhakar by Kashinath Shashtri Appa Tulsi
11. Sangeet Kalp Drumankur by Kashinath Shashtri Appa Tulsi
12. Raga Chandrika by Kashinath Shashtri Appa Tulsi
13. Raga Chandrika Sar (Hindi)
