= Dev Ashish =

Australian-born Indian spiritual leader (1946–2017)

Sri Dev Ashish

Personal life
- Born: David Beresford; 1946 Sydney, New South Wales, Australia
- Died: 27 July 2017 (aged 70–71) Mirtola, Almora district, India

Religious life
- Temple: Mirtola

Senior posting
- Teacher: Sri Madhava Ashish

Sri Dev Ashish (1946–2017) was an Australian-born Indian spiritual leader who ran the Mirtola ashram in Uttarakhand from 1997 to 2017.

== Biography ==
Dev Ashish was born David Beresford in Sydney in 1946 to Nelson Venters Beresford, a Surrey-born farmer in Turramurra, and his artist wife Ethelene Flora (née Venables). The Beresfords were interested in Eastern spirituality and spent time in India, first as followers of Jiddu Krishnamurti and later at the Sri Aurobindo Ashram in Pondicherry, and David grew up in Kumaon.

Though they had originally intended to place David in a biodynamic farm in England, the Beresfords instead moved to Mirtola, then managed by two British-born gurus, Krishna Prem and his disciple Madhava Ashish. "The moment Sri Madhava Ashish set eyes on David," writes Madhava Ashish's disciple Bill Aitken, "he knew he had found his spiritual heir.

After the death of his param-guru, Krishna Prem, in November 1965, Dev Ashish, along with Madhava Ashish, worked to transform the ashram farm and forest, making it a model for environmentally sound rural development. For his work on environmental education, the latter was awarded the Padma Shri in 1992.

In addition to his practical skills, Dev Ashish had a "deep intuitive side" with he would "batter people's personality traits in the mode of the Gurdjieffian 'Madame Vanity and Mr Self-Love'." He was also called 'Dev Da', "Da" meaning elder brother, in the tradition established by his predecessors Krishna Prem ('Gopal Da') and Madhava Ashish ('Ashish Da').

He was deeply devoted to his guru and "attended to him with single-pointed selfnessness" in the last stages of his life. Following Madhava Ashish's death in April 1997, Dev Ashish took over the running of the Mirtola ashram.

== Death and legacy ==
Dev Ashish died by gunshot wound on 27 July 2017. Local authorities said the death of Dev Ashish, who "was deeply involved in social and religious work in the region", appeared to be suicide.

According to the academic Andrew Rawlinson, by appointing "another Westerner, the Australian, David Beresford/Dev, as his successor", Madhava Ashish further cemented Mirtola as an ashram run by a succession of Western-origin teachers. "In other words, there is a branch of Gaudiya Vaishnavism in India that has an established lineage of Western gurus," he writes.
