= Kishansinh Chavda =

- કિશનસિંહ ગોવિંદસિંહ ચાવડા
- Born: Kishansinh Govindsinh Chavda; 17 November 1904; Baroda, Baroda State, British India
- Died: 1 December 1979 (aged 75); Mirtola, near Almora, Uttar Pradesh, India
- Education: Gujarat Vidyapith, Santiniketan
- Occupations: Author, journalist, translator
- Writing career
- Pen name: Gypsy
- Language: Gujarati
- Notable works: Amasna Tara; Gypsy Ni Ankhe
- Notable awards: Narmad Suvarna Chandrak (1950)

Kishansinh Govindsinh Chavda (17 November 1904 – 1 December 1979), also known by his pen name Gypsy, was an Indian Gujarati-language writer and journalist. He studied at Gujarat Vidyapith and Santiniketan, and taught briefly. He started a printing press and was also involved in a writing career. He had spiritual interests which drove him to Aurobindo and Mirtola Ashrams. He wrote autobiographical works and translated some books.

== Life ==
Kishansinh was born on 17 November 1904 at Baroda. He was a native of Bhanj village near Sachin, Surat. He studied in Baroda, Gujarat Vidyapith and Santiniketan. He taught at the Fellowship High School, Bombay for a brief period. He worked as the personal assistant of the rulers of several princely states. He resided at Sri Aurobindo Ashram, Pondicherry from 1927 to 1928. In 1948, he went to Carnegie Institute of Technology, Pittsburgh, US to study printing plant management for six months. After returning, he started a printing press in Baroda, Sadhna Mudranalaya. He was the director of Kshatriya and coeditor of Navjivan magazines. He moved to Mirtola Ashram near Almora in 1960. He died there on 1 December 1979.

== Works ==
While running his press in Baroda, he came in contact with Umashankar Joshi which drew him in the field of literature. He relied on his own experiences and started writing personal essays and later autobiography. His Amasna Tara and Gypsy ni Ankhe are collections of essays about characters and incidents from his own life. Himalaya ni Pada-yatra is about his stay in Himalayas. Amasthi Poonam Bhani is his autobiographical work. He was well-acquainted with Bengali and Hindi literature and had done some translation from both the languages into Gujarati. He translated two commentaries on the Bhagavad Gita in Gujarati, Jnaneshwari from Marathi and Krishna Prem's The Yoga of The Bhagwadgita from English. He also translated the autobiography of Dhondo Keshav Karve in Gujarati.

== Recognition ==
He received Narmad Suvarna Chandrak in 1950 for his book Amasna Tara.

== See also ==
- List of Gujarati-language writers
