= Wasantha Sandanayake =

Sri Lankan singer and playback singer

- වසන්තා සන්දනායක
- Born: Mudunkotuwa Munasinghe Arachchige Leelawathi Perera; 18 October 1917; Balapitiya, Sri Lanka
- Died: 24 November 2000 (aged 83)
- Education: Kegalu Balika Vidyalaya
- Occupation(s): Singer, playback singer
- Spouse: Don Dharmapala Sandanayake
- Children: Don Sarath Sandanayake, Srimathi Sandanayake, Daya Hemantha Abeysekara, Don Sisira Sandanayake, Sujatha Sandanayake, Don Gamini Sandanayake
- Parents: Arnolis Perera (father); Nilenthige Nani Nona (mother)
- Relatives: Shanthi Abeysekera (son-in-law); Supriya Abeysekera (niece); Sadhana Abeysekera (niece); Wimala Kantha (sister-in-law); Sujatha Aththanayaka (cousin daughter); Ranjani Perera (cousin daughter); Susil Perera (cousin son)
- Musical career
- Genres: soul; Indian classical music
- Instrument: Vocals
- Years active: 1937–1992
- Labels: Karolis; His Master's Voice; Colombia; Odian; Saraswathi; Gemtone

Mudunkotuwa Munasinghe Arachchige Leelawathi Perera (Sinhala: වසන්තා සන්දනායක; 18 October 1917 – 24 November 2000), popularly known by her stage name Wasantha Sandanayake, was a Sri Lankan singer, primarily worked as a playback singer in Sinhala film industry. She is often described as a symbol of the Buddhist song tradition in Sri Lanka.

== Personal life ==
She was born on 18 October 1917 in Randombe, Balapitiya as the second child in a family with seven siblings. Her father was Arnolis Perera from Uthuwankande, Kegalle and mother was Nilenthige Nani Nona. She had to move with his family due to the busy schedule of her father. Therefore, she educated from several schools such as Kegalu Balika Vidyalaya, Urapola Madya Maha Vidyalaya and Kollupitiya Jinaraja Vidyalaya.

She has one elder brother Dharmadasa, two younger sisters; Kamala, Chandrawathi, and two younger brothers; Srimath and Dharmadasa. Elder brother Dharmadasa was married to popular Tower Hall actress Wimala Kantha. They have five children, including popular singer Sujatha Aththanayaka, a renowned dance teacher, Ranjani Perera and a popular comedian and musician, Susil Perera. Chandraravathi was married to a station master at Nawalapitiya.

Wasantha was married to Don Dharmapala Sandanayake, who was a police constable. They were married on 10 November 1937. The couple had one son, Sarath and one daughter, Daya Hemantha. Sarath started education from St. Mary's College, Nawalapitiya and later to Mahabodhi Vidyalaya, Maradana. The daughter, Daya Hemantha was married to renowned artist Shanthi Abeysekera. The couple had two daughters, Supriya and Sadhana, both are popular singers. Sadhana is married to Nanditha Ranatunga, the son of veteran artists Dayarathna Ranatunga and Amara Ranatunga. Sarath is married to Karunawathi Perera and the couple has one son; Thushara Sanjaya.

== Career ==
Since school times, she performed in school stage both singing and acting. After school times, she joined with Odian Disc Producers under the guidance of sister-in-law Wimala Kantha. She sang her first solo song Rudu Gathiyen Prane written by U. D. Perera and then Pujemi Buddhan Kusumena Nena for Karolis Label. Later she continued to sing many Buddhist devotional songs. After Odian label, she moved to the Columbia label and His Master's Voice] studios to record the songs. She sang the popular songs Kalyani Ganga Rajini, Nokiyama Eda Esala Mahe and Balanna Budu Samine during this period. She sang the songs Onna Puthe Oya Na Mala and Mage Dayabara Gemunu with her son Sarath.

Due to the popularity among public, she was selected for playback singing for the films Banda Nagarayata Paminima, Saradiel and Susila. She made several duets with the popular singer at that time, including; Mohideen Baig, Dharmadasa Walpola, M. Joharsa, Thilakasiri Fernando and Henry Fonseka. In 1948 Independence Day celebrations, she voiced to Seetha Molamure for the drama depicted for the royalists. During this period, she also recorded the songs; Dola laga Guru Para and Mahaweli Nadiye, which became very popular.

In 1952, she obtained A grade from the Radio Ceylon during a competition held by Indian musician Shrikrishna Narayan Ratanjankar. When D. S. Senanayake was the Minister of Agriculture, Wasantha won the first place in the song competition on agriculture. She also won the first place in the Mother Song Competition held in 1995 among radio singers. In the competition, she sang the emotional song Saadara Karunaa Saagarayak written by Mervyn Senaratne.

During the two years 1984 and 1985, she sang on two cassettes of the productions, "Kalyani Ganga", "Mahaweli Nadiye" at the request of Karunajeewa Ganegoda. She has sung to the music of Mohammad Sally for the Saraswati label and to the music of Sarath Balasuriya for the Gemtone label. She has been involved in the "Peradina Tharu Pela" Music Festival hosted by the Tower Hall Theater Foundation for a long time since the inception of the Gam Udawa project established by president.
