= Yashoda Mai =

Hindu guru (1882–1944)

- Sri Yashoda Mai
- Born: Monica Roy; 1882; Ghazipore, United Provinces, British Raj
- Died: 2 December 1944 (aged 62); Mirtola, Uttarakhand, India
- Occupations: Hindu guru, founder of Mirtola Ashram
- Successor: Sri Krishna Prem
- Spouse: Gyanendra Nath Chakravarti
- Children: 4 biological, 40 adopted

Sri Yashoda Mai (1882–1944), born Monica Roy, was a Hindu guru and the founder of the Mirtola Ashram, also known as Uttar Brindaban, in the Himalayas. She was the wife of Gyanendra Nath Chakravarti, a Theosophist leader and the first Indian vice-chancellor of Lucknow University. While she is primarily remembered as the guru of the British scholar-saint Sri Krishna Prem (Ronald Nixon), she was also a translator of Hindu scripture, having produced a Hindi version of the Bhagavata Purana.

== Early life ==
Monica Devi was born into a Theosophist family in 1882, the daughter of Rai Bahadur Gagan Chandra Roy (b. 1848–49). According to biographer Dilip Kumar Roy, Swami Vivekananda recognized her spiritual potential during her childhood. During a visit to Ghazipur in the 1890s, Swami Vivekananda reportedly selected her for the ritual of Kumari Puja, venerating her as a ritual manifestation of the goddess.

She married Dr. Jnanendra Nath Chakravarti, a Theosophist leader who became the first Indian vice-chancellor of Lucknow University. As the wife of a high-ranking academic administrator in Lucknow, she occupied a significant position in colonial Indian society. She hosted gatherings of Lucknow's intellectual elite and was noted by contemporaries for her charm and wit.

Privately, she maintained a devotional practice behind her social activities. She attended devotional hymns (kirtans), where she was reportedly often moved to tears by songs about Krishna.

In addition to her devotional inclinations, she was also known for her compassion. While raising her four biological children, one of whom, Moti Rani, eventually became a disciple at her ashram, Monica Devi adopted forty other children. She would also rear orphaned puppies that she found. When she eventually departed for the Himalayas due to her health and spiritual calling, leaving her large household reportedly caused her significant distress.

== Spiritual transition ==
Her husband was committed to his Hindu spiritual practice, meditating three hours daily starting at 3:00 a.m., and he was a leader in the Theosophical Society. However, in her search for a spiritual guide, Monica Devi initially sought out various Hindu holy men to find one who could become her guru. Eventually, she requested spiritual initiation from her husband, accepting him as her primary teacher as she felt no other teacher she had encountered possessed his level of spiritual aptitude. In the late 1920s, she reported a spiritual experience of the "unity of being" that she understood to be a culmination of her spiritual endeavors.

=== Spiritual relationship with Ronald Nixon ===
In the 1920s, Ronald Nixon, a British Air Force pilot-turned-English professor at Lucknow University, lived in the Chakravarti household as an adopted member of their family. Following her spiritual experience, Monica Devi wrote to Ronald Nixon: "What you are seeking, that I have found." Impressed by her religious convictions, Nixon requested initiation from her. She agreed to secretly initiate him into Vaishnava Hinduism on the condition that he commit to her as his guru permanently, avoiding what she viewed as the dilettantism of many Western seekers. Scholar David Haberman notes that this relationship inverted the typical colonial dynamic, with an Indian woman serving as the spiritual superior to an educated British male, which helped many Hindus reaffirm the value of their own traditions in the face of colonial derision.

=== Renunciation ===
In 1926, Dr. Chakravarti retired from his position at Lucknow University and the family moved to Varanasi. Monica Devi soon began to feel that her domestic obligations conflicted with her spiritual goals. Additionally, a lung condition that doctors warned could be fatal if she did not move to a cooler climate led her to contemplate leaving home. In 1928, she sought her husband's permission to take sannyasa (renunciant vows) and continue her spiritual endeavors in the Himalayas. He granted her request and personally initiated her into a renunciant order, where she assumed the name Sri Yashoda Ma. Soon thereafter, Nixon gave up his academic career and took renunciant initiation from her, becoming Sri Krishna Prem.

== Mirtola Ashram ==
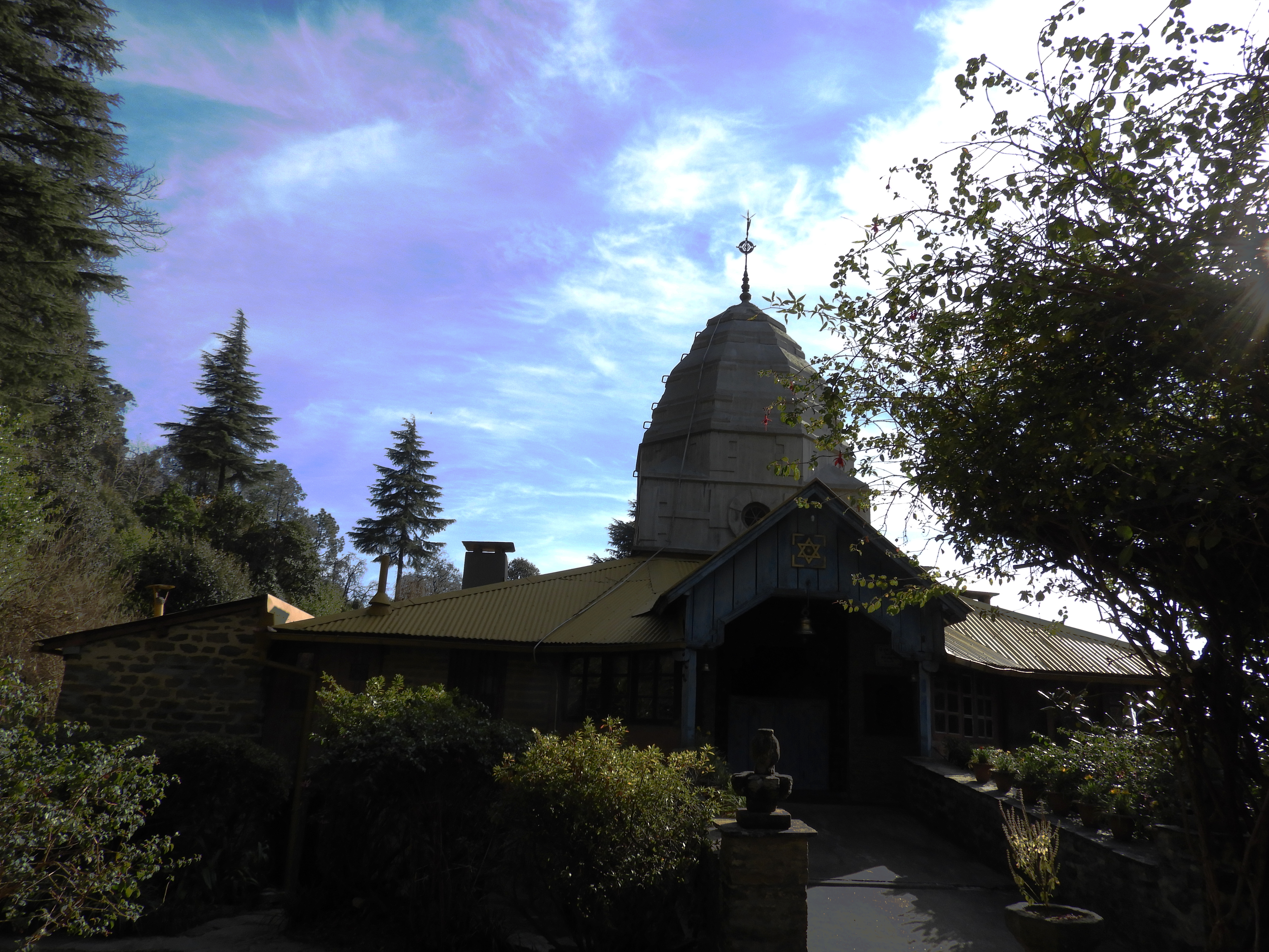
Radha-Krishna Temple at Mirtola Ashram

Yashoda Ma and Krishna Prem relocated to the Almora region of the Himalayas. For the first two years, they had no permanent residence. Krishna Prem collected alms door-to-door for their food in accordance with the Hindu traditions of mendicancy. In 1930, they founded the Mirtola ashram eighteen miles from Almora, naming it "Uttar Brindaban" (Northern Vrindavan). A temple dedicated to Radha and Krishna was completed on the site in 1931.

=== Formal initiation and lineage ===
Although Yashoda Ma functioned as a guru, she had practiced for years without a formal affiliation to a specific Hindu lineage (sampradaya). In February 1931, she and Krishna Prem met Balkrishna Goswami, a spiritual leader of the Radha Raman Temple in Vrindavan. Recognizing the need for a formal lineage connection, Yashoda Ma requested initiation from him. On June 21, 1932, Balkrishna Goswami formally initiated her with the Gopal and Gayatri mantras, thereby affiliating Mirtola with the Gaudiya Vaishnavism of the Vraj region.

=== Discipline and teaching philosophy ===
As the head of the ashram, Yashoda Ma enforced a strict code of traditional Hindu conduct. This included rigorous physical austerities, such as the requirement for disciples to bathe in frigid water during the winter. Her disciples characterized her pedagogical approach as maternal yet uncompromisingly severe towards the ego. She was known to target a student's personal vulnerabilities, employing abrasive language and unrefined metaphors to uncover concealed character faults. If a disciple attempted to argue, she would systematically catalogue their deficiencies, sometimes characterizing them as repugnant to the Divine, a method designed to instill humility.

Together with this strict discipline, her instruction was individualized. For example, when the musician and intellectual Dilip Kumar Roy expressed difficulties with the technical aspects of meditation, she counseled him against forcing a practice that went against his inherent nature. Instead, she advised him to abandon traditional meditative techniques and to channel his spiritual longing through his musical talent, urging him to focus on singing to Krishna.

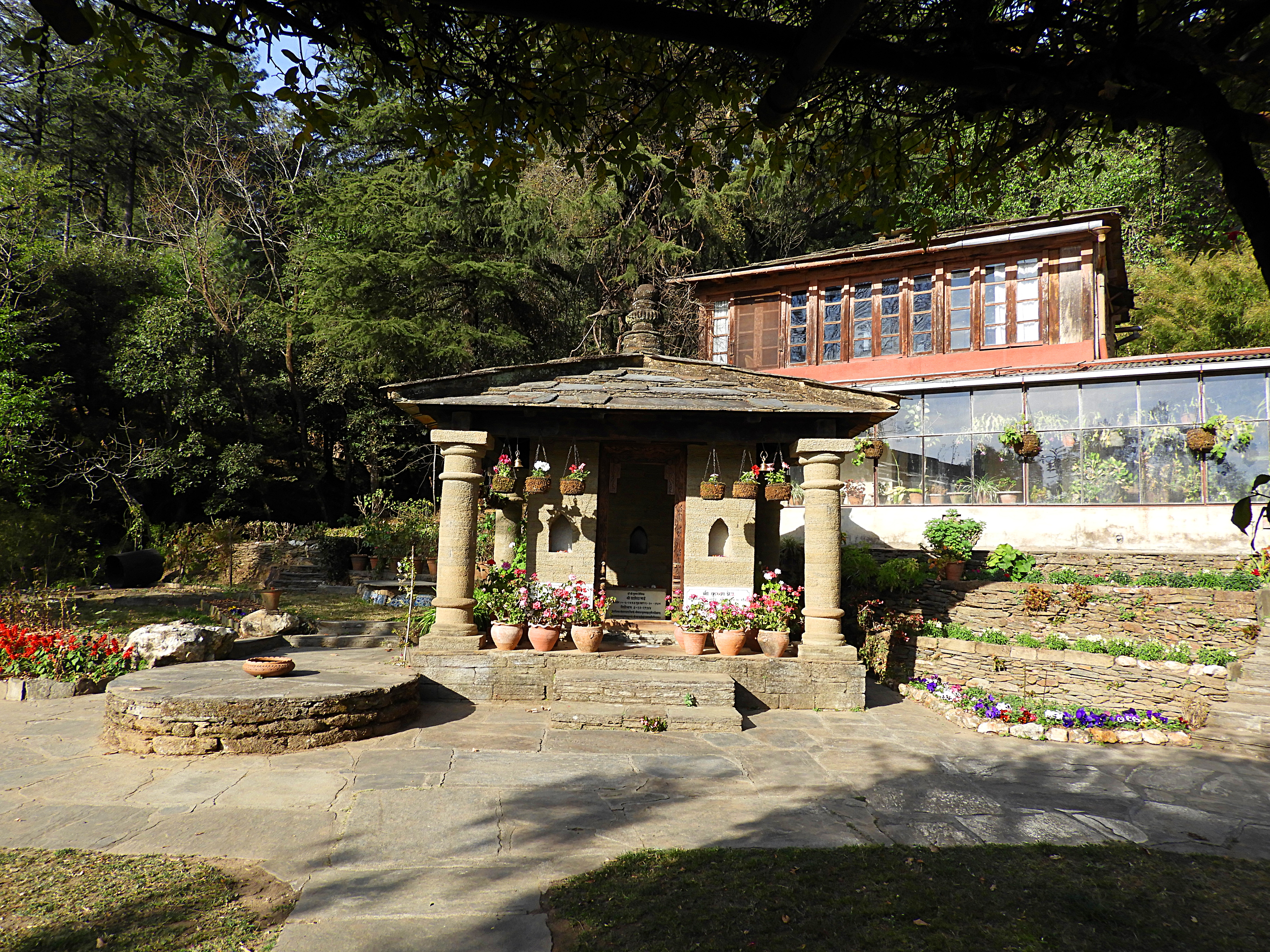
Memorial Shrines for Shri Yashoda Ma and Shri Krishna Prem at Mirtola Ashram

== Death and legacy ==
In 1930, her physician warned that she had only two years to live due to her chronic illnesses. However, she survived for another fourteen years, during which time she was often nursed through her illnesses by Krishna Prem. She died on December 2, 1944, following an acute attack of gallstones. She was cremated on the ashram grounds at a site that became a shrine for later devotees. She had appointed Sri Krishna Prem as her successor, and the ashram continued under his leadership and later that of Sri Madhava Ashish.
