= Mirtola =

- village
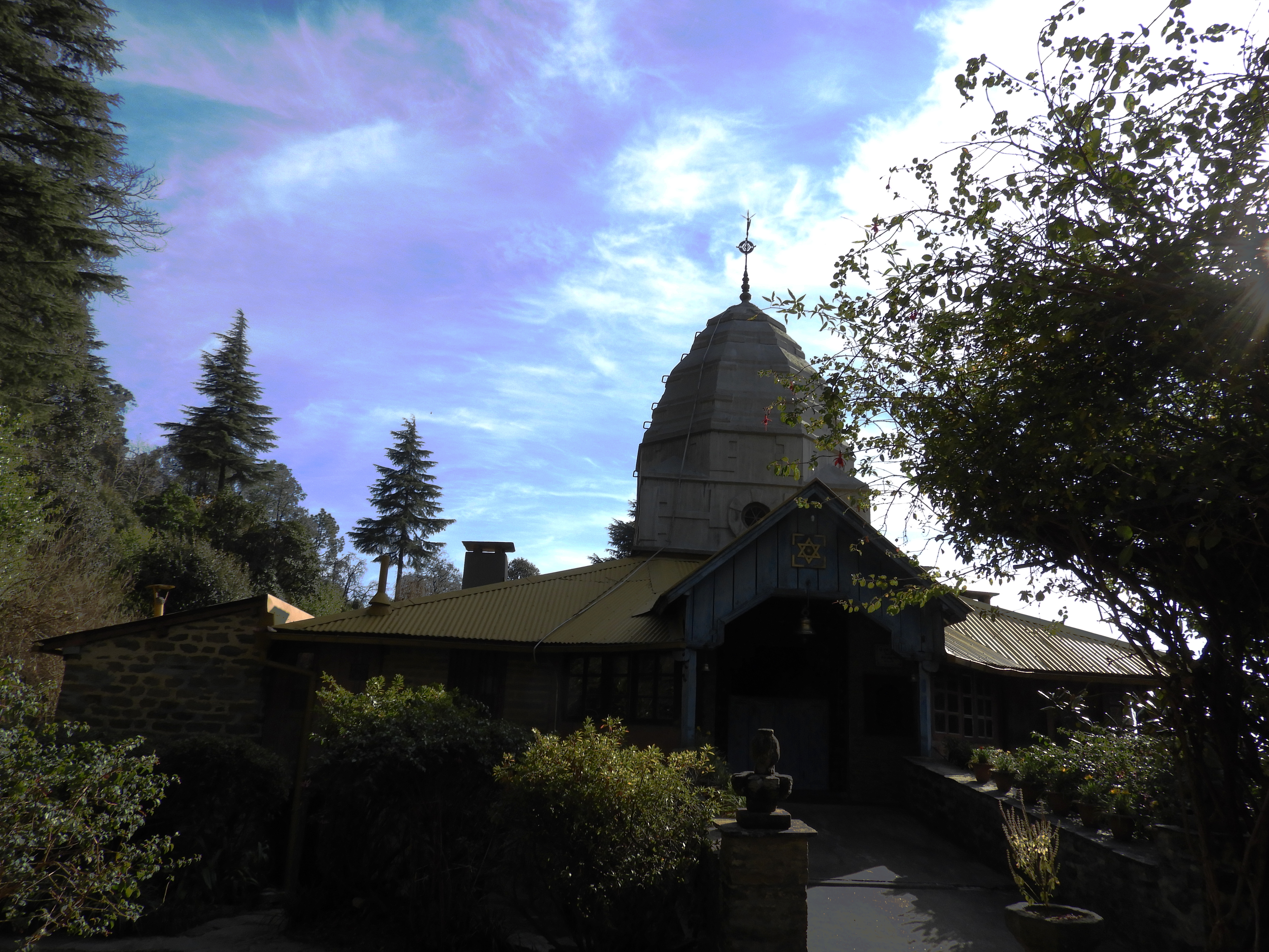
- Radha Krishna Temple at Mirtola Ashram

- Location in Uttarakhand, India Mirtola (India)
- Coordinates: 29.59718°N 79.6570°E
- Country: India
- State: Uttarakhand
- District: Almora
- Elevation: 2,118 m (6,949 ft)

Languages
  - Official: Hindi
- Time zone: UTC+5:30 (IST)
- PIN: 263623
- Vehicle registration: UK
- Climate: Alpine (BSh) (Köppen)
- Website: uk.gov.in

Mirtola is a village 10 km away from Almora, in Uttarakhand state in India. It is best known for an ashram by the same name, also called Uttar Brindaban ("Brindaban of the North"), set up by Sri Yashoda Ma, a housewife turned ascetic in the 1930, along with her disciple Sri Krishna Prem (1898–1965), a mystic of the 20th Century. The ashram was later run by his disciple, Sri Madhava Ashish (1920–1997), another Briton, who also later settled in India.

Mirtola is en route to Pithoragarh from Almora, 3 km to the left of the main road after Panuanaula, 25 km after Almora. The place is also known for a Radha-Krishna temple, Uttar Brindaban, built in 1931 by Sri Yashoda Ma, the founder and the spiritual head of the ashram.

== History ==
=== Origin ===
Yashoda Ma (née Monika Devi) was the wife of Gyanendra Nath Chakravarti, the first vice-chancellor of Lucknow University, who was a well-known theosophist.

Meanwhile, Ronald Henry Nixon, a young English fighter pilot in the World War I, who later took a degree from Cambridge University, came to India in 1921, after he took up a job as a lecturer at the Department of English at the newly opened Lucknow University, it was here that became close to the Chakravartis. In 1927, when Monika Devi moved to the hills on doctors' advice, Ronald Nixon, followed his Guru, and together they stayed in Almora for a while.

Later, in 1928, Monika Devi took the vows of sannyasa (renunciation), under the name 'Sri Yashoda Ma', and a shortly afterwards, Ronald Nixon under the name, 'Sri Krishna Prem'; he was later known as Gopal Da, at the Ashram, which they together established in 1930. Amongst its early inhabitants were Moti Rani (Yashoda Ma's youngest daughter) and Major Robert Dudley Alexander, who retired from his post of Principal, Lucknow Medical College prematurely, to be with Shri Krishna Prem. In October 1943, noted Indian saint Sri Anandamayi Ma, visited the Mirtola Ashram.

Sri Krishna Prem went on to take over the running of the Ashram, after Yashoda Ma's death in 1944, Gopal Da himself passed over on 14 November 1965; before that he wrote books like, The Yoga of the Bhagavad Gita and The Yoga of the Katho-panishad, amongst others and handed over the working of the Ashram to Sri Madhav Ashish in 1955. He has the distinction of being the first westerner, to be included in the Vaishnav form of Hinduism, he also was fluent in Hindi and Bengali.

=== 1960s onwards ===
Sri Krishna Prem (Gopal Da), was followed as a guru, by his disciple, 'Sri Madhav Ashish' (Ashish Da), previously 'Alexander Phipps', was an English aircraft engineer assembling Merlin engines, who came to India during the Second World War in 1942, and met Sri Krishna Prem at Mirtola in 1946, and soon became his disciple. In the following years, they together wrote many books including their two-part work on the Stanzas of Dzyan, contained in the Book of Dzyan, 'Man, the measure of all things: In the stanzas of Dzyan', and 'Man, Son of Man'. Mirtola Ashram became a pilgrimage for Indian theosophists and started working extensively with the local communities pioneering hill farming techniques which he encouraged them to adopt, a work for which Sri Madhava Ashish was awarded the Padma Shri in 1992 by the Indian government, he later died on 13 April 1997, succeeded by his disciple, Sri Dev Ashish.

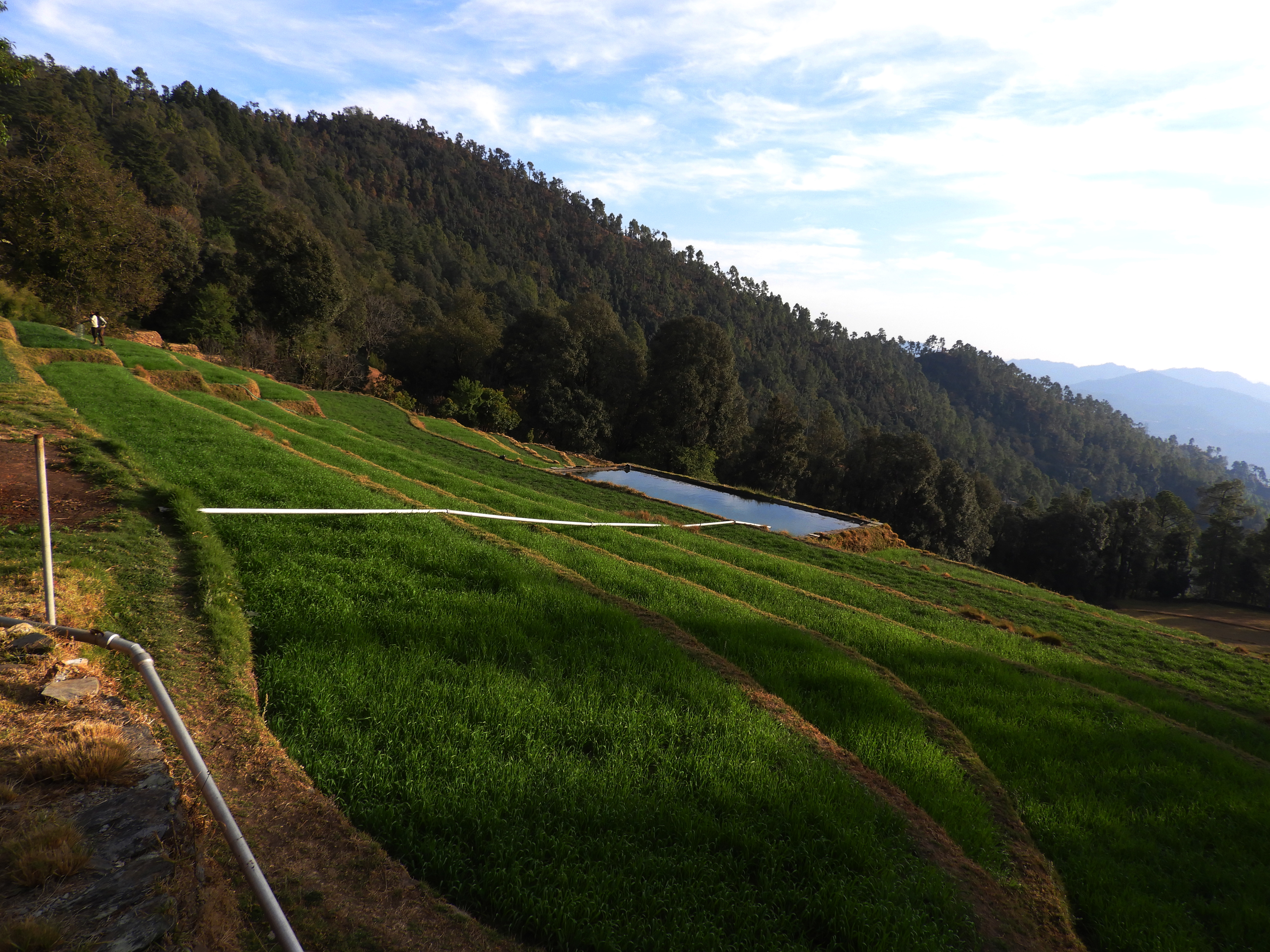
Rainwater harvesting at Mirtola Ashram, 2017

Over the years, the Ashram evolved a unique philosophy based on Eastern mystical thought from the Bhakti traditions, ideas of Shri Nisargadatta and western philosophies like that of G. I. Gurdjieff, Theosophy of Madame Blavatsky, and Jungian dream work, among others. Thus a large number of Gurdjieffians visited the ashram, including Olga de Hartmann, Phillipe Lavastine, Lizelle Reymond, Laurence Rosenthal, James George, and Bernard Courtenay-Mayers; even Jeanne de Salzmann met Ashish Da in Delhi 1971.

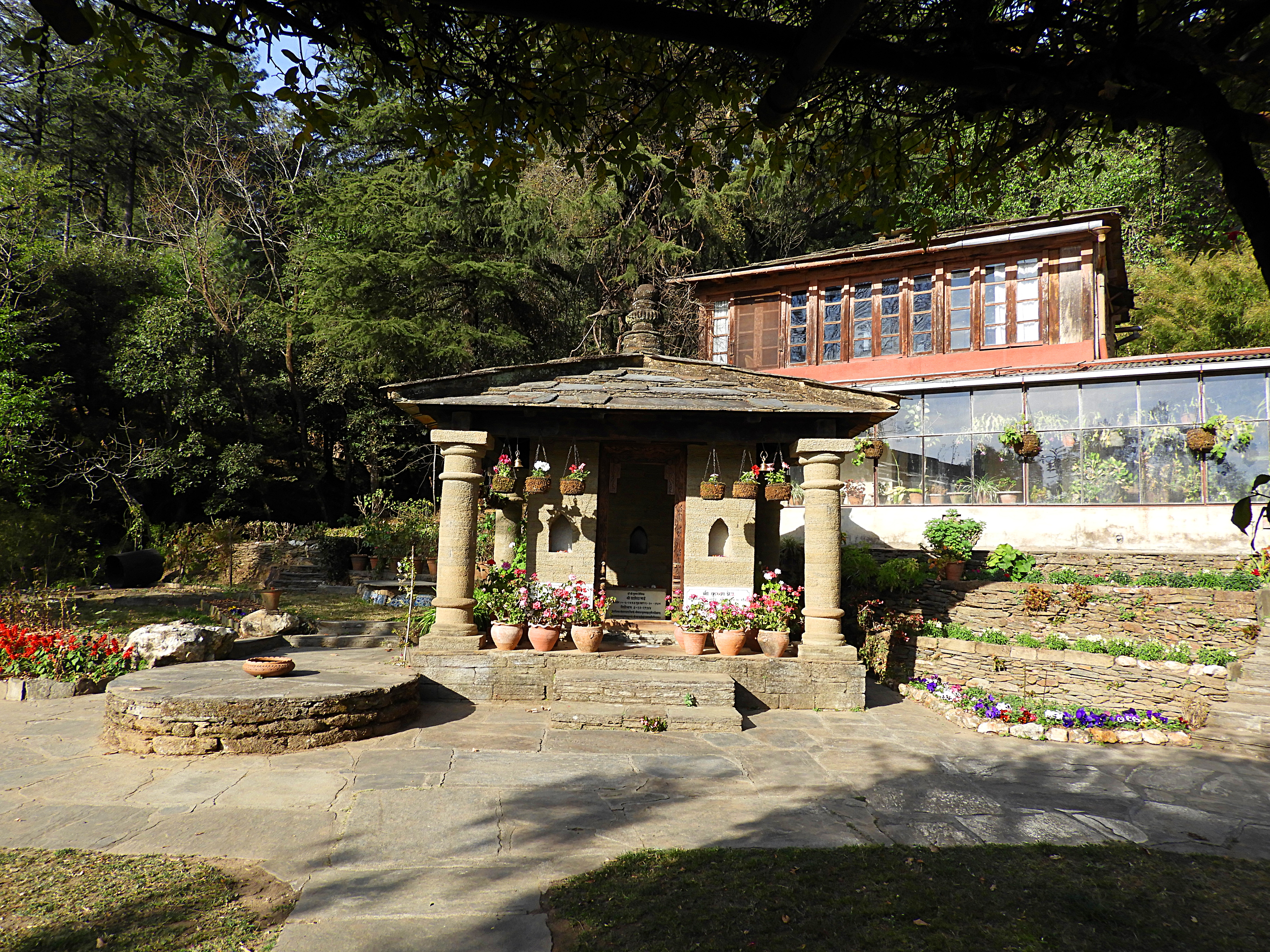
Memorials of Yashoda Ma, Krishna Prem and Madhav Ashish at Mirtola Ashram

Amongst the noted disciples of the 'Mirtola Ashram' are, Seymour B. Ginsburg, the co-founder of the Gurdjieff Institute of Florida; Karan Singh, former Indian Ambassador to the US and present Member of the Indian Parliament, the Rajya Sabha, and travel-writer Bill Aitken. Besides that, many followers of Gurdjieff teachings continued to visit the Ashram for several decades

== See also ==
- Theosophy
- Madame Blavatsky

== Bibliography ==
- The Yoga of the Katho-panishad, Sri Krishna Prem.1955 John M. Watkins.ISBN 0722400748.
- Yogi Sri Krishnaprem by Dilipkumar Roy. 1968 Bharatiya Vidya Bhavan.
- The Yoga of the Bhagavad Gita, Sri Krishna Prem.1973 Penguin.ISBN 0140035729.
- Initiation into Yoga, Sri Krishna Prem, 1976, ISBN 0-09-125631-3.
- Yoga dalam tindak pemulaan, oleh Sri Krishna Prem, Tek Hoay Kwee, (Indonesian),1962 Swastika.
- Writings of Sri Krishna Prem : an introduction, Narendra Nātha Kaul. 1980 Bharatiya Vidya Bhavan.
- Man, the Measure of All Things: In the Stanzas of Dzyan by Sri Krishna Prem, Sri Madhava Ashish. 1969 Theosophical Publishing House. ISBN 978-0-8356-0006-4.
- Man, Son of Man by Sri Madhava Ashish. 1970 Theosophical Publishing House. ISBN 0-8356-0011-4.
- In Search of the Unitive Vision: Letters of Sri Madhava Ashish to an American Businessman, 1978-1997. Seymour B. Ginsburg. 2001, New Paradigm Books, ISBN 1-892138-05-0.
- Guru by Your Bedside, S.D. Pandey. 2003, Penguin, ISBN 0-14-302954-1.
- Letters from Mirtola: Shri Krishna Prem and Shri Madhav Ashish. Ed. Jyotsna Singh, 2004, Bhartiya Vidya Bhavan. ISBN 81-7276-356-5.
- The Unknowable Gurdjieff, memoir, by Margaret Anderson, 1962, Arkana. ISBN 0-14-019139-9.
- The Secret Doctrine as a Contribution to World Thought:Sri Madhava Ashish H.P. Blavatsky and the Secret Doctrine: Commentaries on Her Contributions to World Thought, by Virginia Hanson. Quest Books, 1988. ISBN 0-8356-0630-9, ISBN 978-0-8356-0630-1.page 47-56.
- What Is Man? Selected Writings of Sri Madhava Ashish. Foreword by Karan Singh. Penguin Book, 2010. ISBN 978-0-14-306574-6.
- Chapter VII: In the Realm of Krishna Himalayan Memoirs, by Navnit Parekh. Published by Popular Prakashan, 1986. ISBN 0-86132-126-X.
- Seymour B. Ginsburg (2010). The Masters Speak: An American Businessman Encounters Ashish and Gurdjieff. Quest Books. ISBN 978-0-8356-0882-4.

Articles

- Seymour B. Ginsburg (ed.). "Mirtola: A Himalayan Ashram with Theosophical Roots". Theosophical Society in America, Quest Magazine (Summer 2012). pp. 98–105. Archived from the original on 31 January 2023.
- A description of Sri Krishna Prem's encounter with Ramana Maharishi in 1948
- Dilip Kumar Roy (January–February 2006). "Beyond "Nama-Rupa"" (PDF). The Maharishi (Newsletter of Arunachala Ashrama, NY). pp. 1–2.
