= C. R. Vyas =

Indian classical singer (1924–2002)

Chintaman Raghunath Vyas
- Born: Chintaman Raghunath Vyas; 9 November 1924
- Origin: Osmanabad, Maharashtra, India
- Died: 10 January 2002 (aged 77) Kolkata, West Bengal, India
- Education: Bhatkhande Sanskriti Vishwavidyalaya
- Genre: Hindustani classical music
- Occupation: Singer

Chintaman Raghunath Vyas (9 November 1924 – 10 January 2002), popularly known as C. R. Vyas, was an Indian classical singer. He was known for singing khyal style.

== Early life ==
Vyas was born in Osmanabad, Maharashtra, into a family of Sanskrit scholars and Hari kirtankars. He was influenced by the singing of his father and grandfather, episodes from Ramayan and Mahabharata.

He had his initial music training from Govindrao Bhatambrekar of the Kirana gharana for a decade. Then he learnt from Rajarambua Paradkar of Gwalior. While he was training in the Gwalior style of singing, he was impressed by Jagannathbuwa Purohit who belonged to the Agra gharana and started learning from him. He also got guidance from Yeshwantbuva Mirashi. He also benefited from association with other scholars/musicians, namely S N Ratanjankar, Chidanand Nagarkar, S.C.R. Bhat and K. G. Ginde.

== Career ==
C. R. Vyas had an open-throated voice and sang a blend of all the different gharanas he was trained in, but the influence of the Gwalior gayaki is quite prominent.

He had been employed at ITC in a white collar job. Music was not a primary vocation. In his own words, "In our time we did not think of earning either fame or money through music". He was a leading artist in AIR and on TV. He has participated in major musical events in India as well as abroad.

Among his disciples are Shripad Paradkar (son of his own guru Legendary Gwalior gharana vocalist Pt Rajarambua Paradkar), Prabhakar Karekar, Sriram Parasuram, Mangala Ranade, Sanjeev Chimmalgi, Ganapati Bhat and his son Suhas Vyas. Jitendra Abhisheki was his student for almost ten years.

== Personal life ==
He was married to Smt Indira Vyas. They have three sons-Suhas Vyas, a veteran classical vocalist himself, Satish Vyas, prominent Santoor Player and Shashi Vyas, a Chartered Accountant by profession and now the Managing Director of Pancham Nishad, the leading most event management/organising company of Classical Music.

He also researched traditional ragas and bandishes and composed more than 200 bandishes in different ragas under the pen-name Gunijaan. As a tribute to his Guru Gunidas he started the Gunidas Sangeet Sammelan in 1977. He has written a book Raag Sarita which sums up his work in the field of music. The updated edition of the book was recently released in 2019 by his son Suhas Vyas.

== Awards and recognition ==
- Tansen Sanman by Government of Madhya Pradesh in 1999
- Master Dinanath Mangeshkar Puraskar in 1999
- Marathwada Gaurav Puraskar in 1998
- Ustad Hafiz Ali Khan Award in 1994
- Padma Bhushan in 1992
- Maharashtra Gaurav Puraskar in 1990
- Sangeet Natak Akademi Award in 1987

== Discography ==
- Etched in Time — Pandit C. R. Vyas (VCD — Released in 2007)
- Tapasya — Vol 1 & 2 (2005) This album features Live recordings of Pandit Jasraj, Bhimsen Joshi & Vyas
- Sangeet Sartaj - C R Vyas (Vocal) This double volume album will feature the great Hindustani classical vocalist Vyas. The maestro has rendered in this album ragas like Bihag, Bimpalasi and Ahiri Lalit to name a few.
- Eternal Rhapsody - C R Vyas Live Recording In Mumbai
