= Rajeshwar Bali =

Taluqdar ruler of Rampur - Dariyabad, British India

The Honourable Dr. Raja Saheb Rajeshwar Bali Bahadur OBE MLA RB
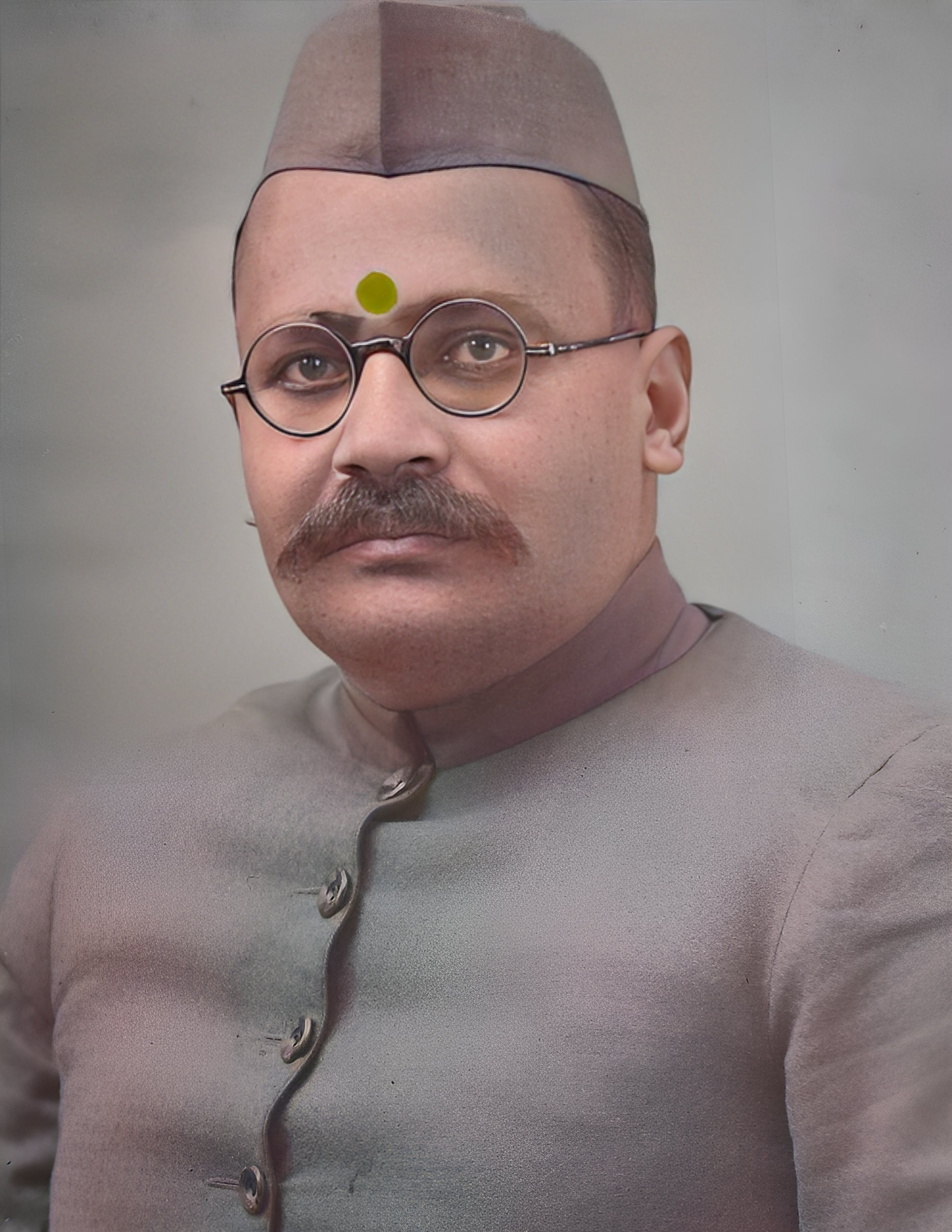

14th Taluqdar Raja of Rampur-Dariyabad
- Preceded by: Raja Rai Narain Bali
- Succeeded by: Raja Rai Dina Nath Bali

Personal details
- Born: 30 July 1889 Dariyabad, North-Western Provinces, British India
- Died: 1944 (aged 54–55) Dariyabad, United Provinces, British India
- Spouse: Rani Shushila Bali
- Children: Bindeshwari, Pushpa Chandra, Rai Dina Nath Bali, Rai Kailash Nath Bali, Mithleshwari Devi, Rai Gopeshwar Bali, Rai Madan Gopal Bali, Rai Kaushlendra Bali

Dr. Raja Rai Rajeshwar Bali Bahadur OBE, MLA, RB (1889–1944) was Taluqdar ruler of Rampur-Dariyabad and an intellectual reformer of British India.

== Life ==
Dr. Raja Rai Rajeshwar Bali Bahadur was born into the royal family of Rampur-Dariyabad. His father, Raja Rai Narain Bali Bahadur, died early when Rajeshwar was 10 years of age. After completing his studies, he took over the reign of Dariyabad as 14th Taluqdar. Dariyabad was a large Kayastha state in Awadh (Oudh), United Provinces (since 1950 called Uttar Pradesh). During his lifetime, he was the head of the Taluqdar Association of Oudh. From 1924 to 1928, he was the education minister of the United Provinces. Under the Diarchial System of Government of India Act 1919, he was elected to the United Provinces Legislative Council (UP Assembly) from the non-Muslim rural area of Barabanki district.

His main contributions were the passage of the Agra University act, the creation of the Bhatkhande College of Hindustani Music(now known as Bhatkhande Sanskriti Vishwavidyalaya), and the creation of the primary education system of India.

== In office ==
From July 1924 – June 1928 He was Minister of Education, Medical Relief & Public Health and Local Self-Government of the UP Assembly. In 1920 he represented the non-Muslim rural constituency of Barabanki district. He was appointed an officer of the Order of the British Empire in the 1919 New Year Honours by King George V. The passing of the Agra University Act and Primary Education Bill in the UP Assembly was also due to his efforts. For this, he was conferred a Doctor of Literature degree by Lucknow University and he was included in the Encyclopedia of Great Men of the World, published in the US.

After getting into the ministry, he gave concrete shape to the development schemes he was planning. Several reforms were enacted during his ministry. The establishment of different educational institutions and community health services without discrimination to religion, caste, or creed was one of the achievements of his tenure. It was his wish that no foreigner could call his countrymen illiterate and uncultured. He planned several educational and health schemes and made the government provide maximum financial assistance.

After independence, the prime minister of India Jawaharlal Nehru disclosed to Sri Mahesh Chandra, a senior journalist from The Statesman that he and other Congress members had Raja Saheb's name in mind for the first President of India.

== University of Lucknow ==
Raja Saheb contributed towards the annual membership of University of Lucknow from his estate from 1917, when it was known as Canning College. As reported in History of Lucknow University Vol. 1 (1921–1951) by B. N. Puri, when the first meeting of the Lucknow University Court was held on March 21, 1921, under the presidency of Chancellor Harcourt Butler, He was among the top 45 members who attended it. He also contributed to the development of the university. The university honored him for his services with a Doctorate of Literature during its convocation in 1936. Later he was a member of the executive council of the university for several years. A gold medal in the Hindi department is awarded annually in his name by the university.

In the early part of the 20th century, Hindustani classical music was confined to temples. He was instrumental in bringing the music to the public by opening one of the first music colleges of India, called the Bhatkhande College of Hindustani Music in Lucknow. For this, he invited Vishnu Narayan Bhatkhande and requested him to write the grammar of Hindustani classical music.

The then-governor of the United Provinces Sir William Marris appointed Raja Saheb as the minister of education in 1922.

== Rampur-Dariyabad Palace - Dr. Raja Rai Rajeshwar Bali Bahadur ==
Dariyabad Palace was built by Hon'ble Dr. Raja Saheb and is a remarkable example of Rajput architecture. Construction began in 1924, making it the third palace of the royal family in Rampur Dariyabad.

Raja Saheb, seeking to accommodate his growing family, embarked on an ambitious project to expand his ancestral home. He constructed a new palace next to the original one, drawing inspiration from India’s art and music traditions, which played a central role in the design of the building.

== Other prominent work ==
Dr. Raja Saheb was appointed Chairman of the United Provinces Franchise Committee on Jan 26, 1932, the main aim of which was to decide the voting rights of women and the representation of the backward classes and labor classes.

In 1924, he also built a new palace in Dariyabad in the Hindustani architectural style and encouraged his family members to develop their talent in Hindustani music.

The Kayastha community made him the president of the All-India Kayastha Conference in 1933. He was the chairman of the Hindu Educational Society from 1929 until 1944. Later in 1957, a hostel of the Society's Civil Engineering School in Lucknow was named after him.

He was succeeded by his eldest son Rai Dina Nath Bali. Rai Kaushlendra Bali, his youngest son, was also an avid Krishna and Ram Bhakt and wrote many poems. In 2011, 2012, and 2013 he received a national language pride award from the All India Hindi Service Institute for his work in Hindi literature.

Rai Dina Nath Bali took over the state in 1944 and became the last ruling taluqdar of Rampur-Dariyabad.
