= Amara Ranatunga =

Prof. Amara Ranatunga අමරා රණතුංග
- Born: Dona Amara Kasthuriarachchi; 22 August 1939; Gampaha, Sri Lanka
- Died: 16 October 2018 (aged 79); Colombo
- Resting place: Borella General Cemetery
- Education: Hanwella Rajasinghe Central College
- Alma mater: Bhatkhande University; Banaras Hindu University
- Occupations: Singer, Music Director
- Spouse: Dayarathna Ranatunga (m. 1964)
- Children: 3
- Awards: Bharatha Mithra; Janabhimani
- Musical career
- Genres: Pop; soul; Ragadhari music; Indian classical music
- Instruments: Vocals, Tanpura
- Years active: 1948–2018
- Label: Vijitha Trade Centre

Prof. Dona Amara Kasthuriarachchi (Sinhala:අමරා රණතුංග: born 22 August 1939 – 16 October 2018), popularly known as Amara Ranatunga, was a Sri Lankan singer and music director. One of the most honored singers of Sri Lanka, Amara is the first Professor of Music in Sri Lanka.

== Personal life ==
Amara was born on 22 August 1939 in Batuwatta, Gampaha as the fifth child of the family with eleven siblings. Her father, Don Wiyolis Kasthuriarachchi was the Head Master of the Hanwella Primary School. Her mother, Dona Alpinona Meegahapola was a housewife. Her father was from Batuwatta and her mother was from Mathugama. She was educated at Hanwella Primary School and later attended to Hanwella Rajasinghe Central College. She played netball and attended other activities at school including learning ballet under maestro Wasantha Kumara.

She was married to Dr. Dayarathna Ranatunga (born as Ranatunga Arachchige Dayarathna Ranatunga) where they got registered on 8 August 1963 and celebrated wedding on 30 January 1964. Dayarathna was born on 29 October 1940 as the youngest child to a family of six in Nawala, Nugegoda. His father Charles Peter Ranatunga was a school principal and his mother Dona Maslin Kolombage was a housewife. He completed education from Ananda Sastralaya, Kotte. After SSC exam, he attended to Zahira College, Colombo and studied in the Maths stream. In 1964, he was selected to a research officer post at the Tyre Corporation. Without any satisfaction from the career, he again moved to music where he was invited for Sri Lanka Broadcasting Corporation (SLBC). In 1969, Dayarathna joined with SLBC as the first Producer in the Music Unit where he was promoted as the Head of Department - Controller of Sinhala Music in 1978. Dayarathna's elder sister, Somalatha Ranatunga is also a singer. Dayarathna's maternal uncle D. M. Kolambage was the first Sinhala announcer at the Radio Ceylon.

The couple has two sons: Nanditha Sarada, Pulasthi Indika and a daughter, Kumudumathie Rupashika. Their son, Pulasthi sang the song Senpathiyan Gena Nawpathiyan Gena with mother Amara at the age of eight. Nanditha is married to Sadhana Abeysekara, who is the granddaughter of late songstress Wasantha Sandanayake. Sadhana's sister, Supriya is also a popular singer in Sri Lanka.

On 16 October 2018, Amara died at the age of 79 while receiving treatment at a private hospital for a heart attack. Her remains were brought to the University of the Visual & Performing Arts at 1.00 pm and later the final rites were held at the Borella General Cemetery on 18 October 2018.

== Career ==
She started her singing career at the age of eight or ten with the first song Yamuna Yamuna Sobana Yamuna. She got the opportunity to sing in a play after recognizing Ananda Sarath Wimalaweera and U. A. S. Perera in her college days, who were involved in the radio service during this period. She got the opportunity of singing according to the music of the musician Lionel Edirisinghe, and playing a role in the play Keppetipola produced by the program 'Lama Uyana' presented by Sarath Wimalaweera. She was an artist in the "Lama Uyana" program in 1948-49 and soon sang a motherly song under the scholar B. S. Wijeratne. In 1950, she had the opportunity to act in Wasantha Kumara's play Sanda Kinduru.

While in the school in 1952, Amara joined Heywood and mastered classical music under B. S. Wijeratne. Both Amara and Dayarathna began studying classical music at the age of twelve. Dayarathna was the first male student of Heywood, whereas Amara was the first female student. At the end of the six-year course at the Heywood College of Music, Amara and Dayaratne got teaching appointments at the age of 18. Amara was appointed to the Meegoda Central College and Dayaratne received the appointment at Richmond College, Galle. She continued to work as a teacher for 43 years.

In 1961, Amara entered Bhatkhande University in India. After returning to Sri Lanka in 1964, she worked as a lecturer at the Government College of Music on 1 February. Meanwhile, she became a graduate of the Banaras Hindu University and later served as the Head of the Department of Aesthetics at the University of Kelaniya for some time. She studied "Dhrupad" vocal methods under Prof. Ritwik Sanyal and "Khyal" singing from Dr. Chitta Ranjan Jyothish. After the Department of Fine Arts was later transformed into the University of the Visual and Performing Arts, Amara also served as its Professor and Head of the Department.

In 1986, she started her career in music professionally. Due to her excellence in the field of classical research music, she also became its Head of Department and later promoted to professor in 1995. For her doctorate, she composed own classical melodies for 34 Hindi lyrics and 10 Sinhala songs. Her first duet came with her husband, Maha Ra Yame. Later, she sang several popular classical songs such as Selalihiniyo Numba Danne Na, Eye Ra Oba Sihinen, Radha Krishna and Amara Devi. Apart from that, she wrote several books such as Amara Geetha, Sarasa Sambhava, Saundarya Avabodhaya and Sambhavya Sangeethaya.

In 1997, to commemorate the 55th Independence of India, the Indian Government awarded "Bharatha Mithra" to the Amara and her husband Dayarathna. From 1997 to 2001, Dayarathna and Amara became lecturers on North Indian Classical music in the Ethno Musicology Department at the California University. On 6 December 2007, a completed cd album produced by Vijitha Trade Centre label known as "Udumbara" in 2008. felicitation ceremony "Maha Re Yame, Dayaratna-Amara Abhinandana" was held at 6.30 p.m. at BMICH. On 17 August 2011, a CD containing new songs was released at 5 pm in the Ananda Samarakoon studio of the Sri Lanka Broadcasting Corporation. On that day, Yapa Bandara Seneviratne's book "Sinhala Sangeethaye Dayaratne Ranatunga Suvipul Siyatsara" was also released.
