= Bill Aitken (writer) =

British-Indian writer (1934–2025)

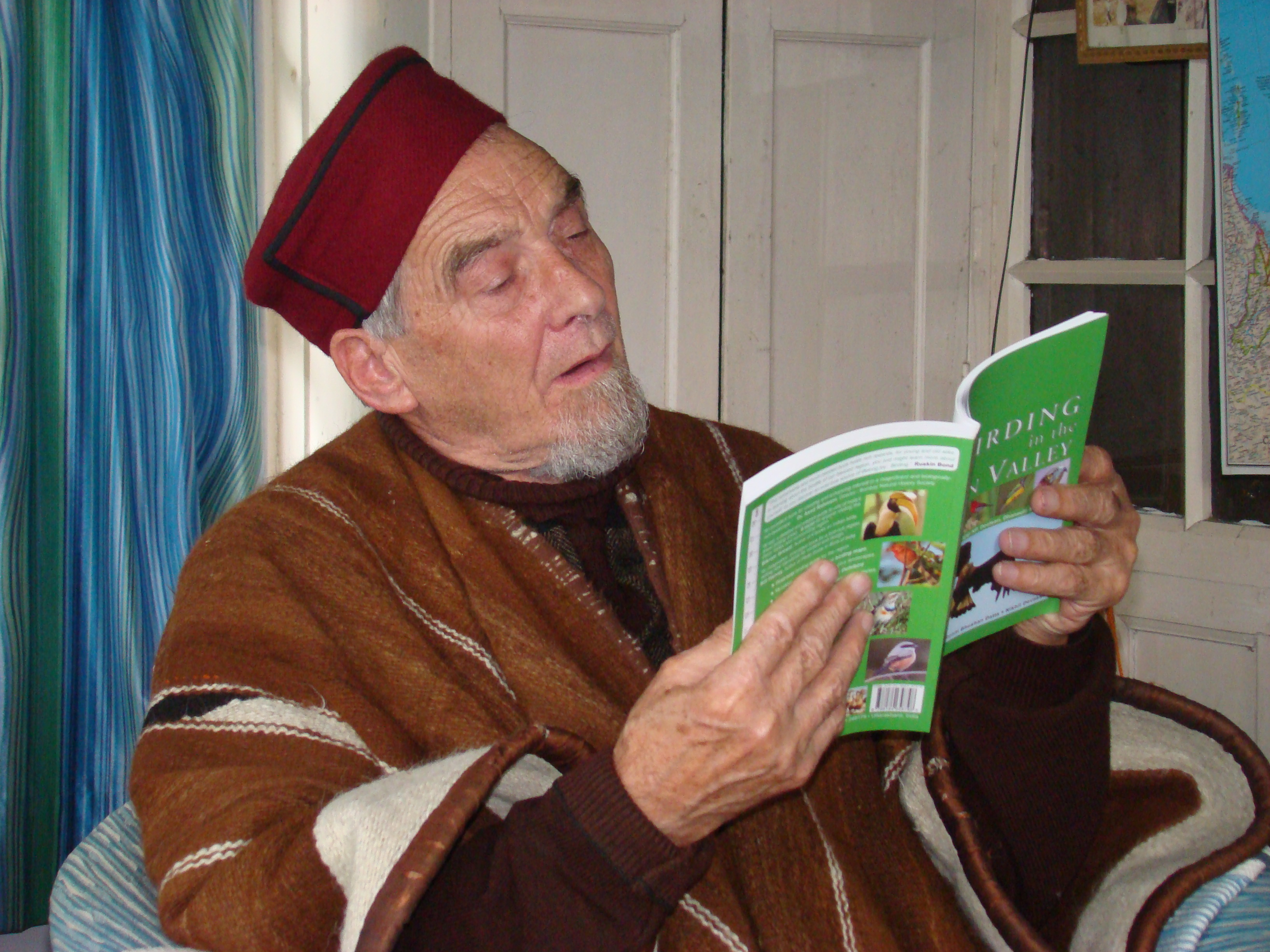
- Aitken at his Mussoorie home, 2012
- Born: 31 May 1934; Tullibody, Scotland
- Died: 16 April 2025 (aged 90); Dehradun, Uttarakhand, India
- Occupations: Traveller, writer
- Writing career
- Period: 1975–2025

William McKay Aitken (31 May 1934 – 16 April 2025) was a British-born Indian travel writer and mountain enthusiast. He was the author of a number of books about India, its mountains, rivers and its steam trains.

== Life and career ==
Aitken was born in Tullibody in Clackmannanshire, Scotland, in 1934. He attended Handsworth Grammar School in Birmingham and completed an M.A in comparative religion at the University of Leeds. In 1959, he hitchhiked overland to India and taught for a year at Hindi High School in Calcutta. From 1960 to 1972, he lived in Himalayan ashrams at Kausani and Mirtola, where he studied under Sri Krishna Prem. In 1972, he became a naturalised Indian citizen. With the blessings of guru Sri Madhava Ashish he joined Prithwi Bir Kaur, the dowager Maharani of the erstwhile Sikh Princely state of Jind, as a companion. Based in Delhi and Mussoorie, Aitken travelled widely in India, covering the religious landscape in a dozen travel books. His writings are characterised by a free-wheeling description of his travels, interspersed with intimate details of the land and its people and their religious beliefs. He was President of the Friends of the National Rail Museum in New Delhi and hon. Librarian of the Himalayan Club.

From the 1970s until his death in 2025, Aitken lived in the hill station of Mussoorie in the Lower Western Himalaya. The surrounding region provided much of the material for his writings. With the death of Prithwi Bir Kaur in 2010, he was appointed a trustee of the Maharani Prithwi Jind Memorial Trust till 2014.

Aitken died in Dehradun, Uttarakhand, on 16 April 2025, at the age of 90. He had suffered a fall at his home a few days earlier and had been rushed to a medical facility in Dehradun.

== Works ==
- Seven Sacred Rivers, 1992 (Penguin Books India), ISBN 0-14-015473-6
- Divining the Deccan – A Motorbike to the Heart of India, (Oxford, 1999), ISBN 0-19-564-7114
- Footloose in the Himalaya, (Delhi, Permanent Black, 2003), ISBN 81-7824-052-1
- The Nanda Devi Affair, 1994 (Penguin Books India), ISBN 0-14-024045-4
- Touching Upon the Himalaya: Excursions and Enquiries, 2004 (Indus Books, New Delhi, 2004), ISBN 81-7387-169-8
- Exploring Indian Railways, (Oxford University Press, New Delhi, 1994), ISBN 0-19-563109-9
- Branch Line to Eternity, 2001 (Penguin Books India), ISBN 0-14-100537-8
- Sri Sathya Sai Baba – A Life, 2004 (Viking/Penguin Books India Pvt. Ltd.), ISBN 0-670-05807-6
- Literary Trails (1996), HarperCollins, ISBN 81-7223-240-3
- Riding the Ranges – Travels on my Motorcycle (1997), Penguin Books India, ISBN 0-14-026804-9
- Mountain Delight, English Book Depot, Dehradun, (1994), ISBN 81-85567-16-6
- Travels By a Lesser Line, HarperCollins, (1993), ISBN 81-7223-086-9
- Zanskar, 1999, Rupa Classic India, ISBN 81-7167-199-3
- 1000 Himalayan Quiz, 1995, Rupa, ISBN 81-7167-290-6
