= Veronika Dassanayaka =

Sri Lankan dancer, choreographer, artist

Veronika Dassanayaka also spelt Veronika Dassanayake is a Sri Lankan dancer, choreographer, artist and lecturer. She has also served as a major of Sri Lanka Army and also served as the leader of Sri Lanka Army dancing troupe.

== Biography ==
She pursued an interest in dancing since her school days. She began her primary education at the Pushpadana Girls' College in Kandy and she later switched to Anula Vidyalaya in Nugegoda to complete the remainder of her school studies. She initially learned Kandyan dancing under the guidance of Vidhawathi Rajapaksha.

== Career ==
Veronika received the Indian Council for Cultural Relationship (ICCR) scholarship offer in 2002 and enrolled at the Bhatkhande Sanskriti Vishwavidyalaya (also known as Bhatkhande Music University), an art school based in Lucknow. She received the opportunity to study at Bhatkhande Music University soon after completing her GCE Advanced Level Examination. She obtained her Bachelor of Arts degree with in 2008 from the Bhatkhande Music University.

She gained her training sessions in Kathak dance from Kathak teacher, Arjun Mishra. She obtained her Master of Arts degree at the University of Visual and Performing Arts in 2012. She has also conducted Kathak dance lectures to students in Sri Lanka. Two of Veronika Dassanayaka's Kathak dance students, Chithreena Medis and Thelma Medis, became the first mother-daughter duo to conduct a Kathak dance stage performance. During her career, she created and developed a unique style of performing arts as part of her experiments in order to enhance the quality of performing arts by adding a wider canvas of emotions, expressions, and dimensions.

She has performed Kathak dances catering to Indian audiences during occasional tours to India in and has also toured other countries, performing recitals and lecture demonstrations.
