= Chaturdandiprakashika =

Sanskrit treatise by Venkatamakhin

The Chaturdandiprakashika (IAST: Caturdaṇḍīprakāśikā; "The Illuminator of the Four Pillars of Music") is a Sanskrit treatise written by the musicologist Venkatamakhin in the mid-17th century. It introduced a theoretical melakarta system to classify and organise ragas in the Carnatic music tradition of India. In the 20th-century, this system would form the basis of the thaat system that is used in Hindustani classical music today. Some portions of the Chaturdandiprakashika are now lost.

== Description ==
In Carnatic music, a mela is a scale of svaras in ascending order in a melodic unit forms the basis and gives birth to ragas. While the concept of melas is said to have been introduced by Vidyaranya in the 14th century, and a number of other musicologists before Venkatamakhin had expounded on the subject, there was a lack of a standard work that systematically classified the ragas of classical music. Vijayaraghava Nayak (r. 1633–1673) commissioned Venkatamakhin to prepare such a treatise which led to the creation of the Chaturdandiprakashika. The title translates to "the illuminator of the four pillars" (of music). It alludes to a system of four divisions of composition, namely ālāpa (rhythmically free exposition of a raga), ṭhāya (melodic inflection), gīta (vocal composition in a raga) and prabandha (a compositional structure). The work led to the creation of the melakarta system of classification and the formulation of the 72 mela (or parent) ragas that are the foundation of the classical music of South India today.

In the early 20th-century, Vishnu Narayan Bhatkhande, a musicologist from Bombay, chanced upon the Chaturdandiprakashika and used its melakarta system as the basis for the thaat system that is currently used to organise and classify ragas in Hindustani classical music.

Some portions of the treatise are now lost.
