= Dayarathna Ranatunga =

Dr. Dayarathna Ranatunga දයාරත්න රණතුංග
- Born: Ranatunga Arachchige Dayaratne Ranatunga; 29 October 1940 (age 85); Nugegoda, Sri Lanka
- Education: Ananda Sastralaya, Kotte
- Alma mater: Bhatkhande University
- Occupations: Singer, Music Director
- Spouse: Amara Ranatunga (m. 1964)
- Children: 3
- Parents: Charles Peter Ranatunga (father); Dona Maslin Kolombage (mother)
- Awards: Bharatha Mithra; Janabhimani
- Musical career
- Genres: Pop; soul; Ragadhari music; Indian classical music
- Instrument: Vocals
- Years active: 1984–present
- Label: Vijitha Trade Centre

Dr. Ranatunga Arachchige Dayarathna Ranatunga (Sinhala: දයාරත්න රණතුංග; born 29 October 1940), popularly known as Dayarathna Ranatunga, is a Sri Lankan singer and music director. One of the most honored singers of Sri Lanka, Dayarathna is considered as an icon in Ragadhari music in Sri Lanka.

== Early life ==
Dayaratne was born on 29 October 1940 as the youngest child to a family of six in Nawala, Nugegoda. His father, Charles Peter Ranatunga, was a school principal and his mother, Dona Maslin Kolombage, was a housewife. He completed his education from Ananda Sastralaya, Kotte. After his SSC exam, he attended Zahira College, Colombo and studied in the Maths stream. During his years in school, he excelled at Volleyball and Wrestling.

Dayarathna's elder sister, Somalatha Ranatunga, is also a singer. Dayarathna's maternal uncle D. M. Kolambage was the first Sinhala announcer at the Radio Ceylon.

He was married to Prof. Amara Ranatunga (born as Dona Amara Kasthuriarachchi) where they got registered on 8 August 1963 and celebrated their wedding on 30 January 1964. Amara was born on 22 August 1939 at Hanwella as the fifth child of the family with eleven siblings. Her father, Don Wiyolis Kasthuriarachchi, was the Head Master of the Hanwella Primary School. Her mother, Dona Alpinona Meegahapola, was a housewife. She completed her education at Hanwella Central College. In 1961, Amara entered Bhatkhande University in India where she later became the first Sri Lankan Professor in Hindustani classical music in the University of Visual and performing arts.

On 16 October 2018, Amara died at the age of 79 while receiving treatment at a private hospital for a heart attack. Her remains were brought to the University of the Visual & Performing Arts at 1.00 pm and later the final rites were held at the Borella General Cemetery on 18 October 2018.

The couple has two sons: Nanditha Sarada and Pulasthi Indika, and a daughter, Kumudumathie Rupashika. Their son Pulasthi sang the song Senpathiyan Gena Nawpathiyan Gena with his mother Amara at the age of eight. Nanditha is married to Sadhana Abeysekara, who is the granddaughter of late songstress Wasantha Sandanayake. Sadhana's sister, Supriya, is also a popular singer in Sri Lanka.

== Career ==
While in the school in 1952, Dayarathna joined Heywood and mastered classical music. Both Dayarathna and Amara began studying classical music at the age of twelve. He was the first male student of Heywood, whereas Amara was the first female student. After his school years, he completed the London B.Sc. in Maths. At the end of the six-year course at the Heywood College of Music, Amara and Dayaratne got teaching appointments at the age of 18. Amara was appointed to the Hanwella school and Dayaratne received the appointment at Richmond College, Galle. However, he quit from the job after one day. Later, he joined Maradana technical college.

After that, he joined with the Buddhist University College, Rosmead Place for a short period. To accomplish as a musician, he went India and studied Eastern Music in Bhatkhande University. He later obtained Visharada along with his wife Amara. In 1964, he was selected to a research officer post at the Tyre Corporation. Without any satisfaction from the career, he again moved to music where he was invited for Sri Lanka Broadcasting Corporation (SLBC). In 1969, she joined with SLBC as the first Producer in the Music Unit. In 1978, he was promoted as the Head of Department - Controller of Sinhala Music.

In 1984, Dayarathna became the Director of Music and Music Research where he was the in-charge of all four music units - Sinhala, English, Tamil, Hindi and Muslim, as well as all the regional services. He continued to render the musical service and guidance to the music field through the SLBC and finally retired in 1996. His duet 'Maha Re yame' was first sung by him and his elder sister, Somalatha Ranatunga.

Apart from music, Dayarathna wrote several classical books to the local students who sit for the Bhathkanda classical exams such as "Sangeetha Vimarshana" and "Sangeethaya". He is also the pioneer to introduce music as a therapy for the first time in Sri Lanka with his book "Music Mind Therapy". In his book, "Polynesian Music and Dancing" depicts the culture and performing arts of Oceanian islands; Australia, New Zealand and Fiji Islands. He also wrote a children's book, "Salmal". In 1994, he won the UNDA International Award.

In 1997, to commemorate the 55th Independence of India, the Indian Government awarded "Bharatha Mithra" to Dayarathna and his wife Amara. From 1997 to 2001, Dayarathna and Amara became lecturers on North Indian Classical music in the Ethno Musicology Department at the California University. On 6 December 2007, a felicitation ceremony, a completed CD album produced by Vijitha Trade Centre label known as "Udumbara" in 2008 "Maha Re Yame, Dayaratna-Amara Abhinandana" was held at 6.30 p.m. at BMICH. On 17 August 2011, a CD containing new songs was released at 5 pm in the Ananda Samarakoon studio of the Sri Lanka Broadcasting Corporation. On that day, Yapa Bandara Seneviratne's book "Sinhala Sangeethaye Dayaratne Ranatunga Suvipul Siyatsara" was also released.

In 2019, The Janabhimani or Hela Maha Rawana Rajabhimani Awards Ceremony was held at the Jasmine Auditorium at the BMICH where Dayarathna won the Best Service Award.
