= Kegalu Balika Vidyalaya =

- කෑගලු බාලිකා විද්‍යාලය

Location
- Bandaranayaka Avenue; Kegalle, Sabaragamuwa Province; Sri Lanka; 7°14′58″N 80°21′3″E

Information
- Former names: Kegalu Buddhist English Ladies College
- Type: National School
- Motto: Sinhala: ආලෝකයෙන් ආලෝකයට (Lighted to Lighten)
- Religious affiliation: Buddhism
- Established: 2 November 1943; 82 years ago
- Founder: Anula Udalagama
- Principal: H. A. T. D. K. Jayarathna
- Teaching staff: 187
- Grades: 1 to 13
- Gender: Girls
- Age range: 6 to 19
- Enrolment: 4,000
- Language: Sinhala and English
- Colours: Blue and light blue
- Alumni name: Old KBVians
- Website: www.kegalubalika.com

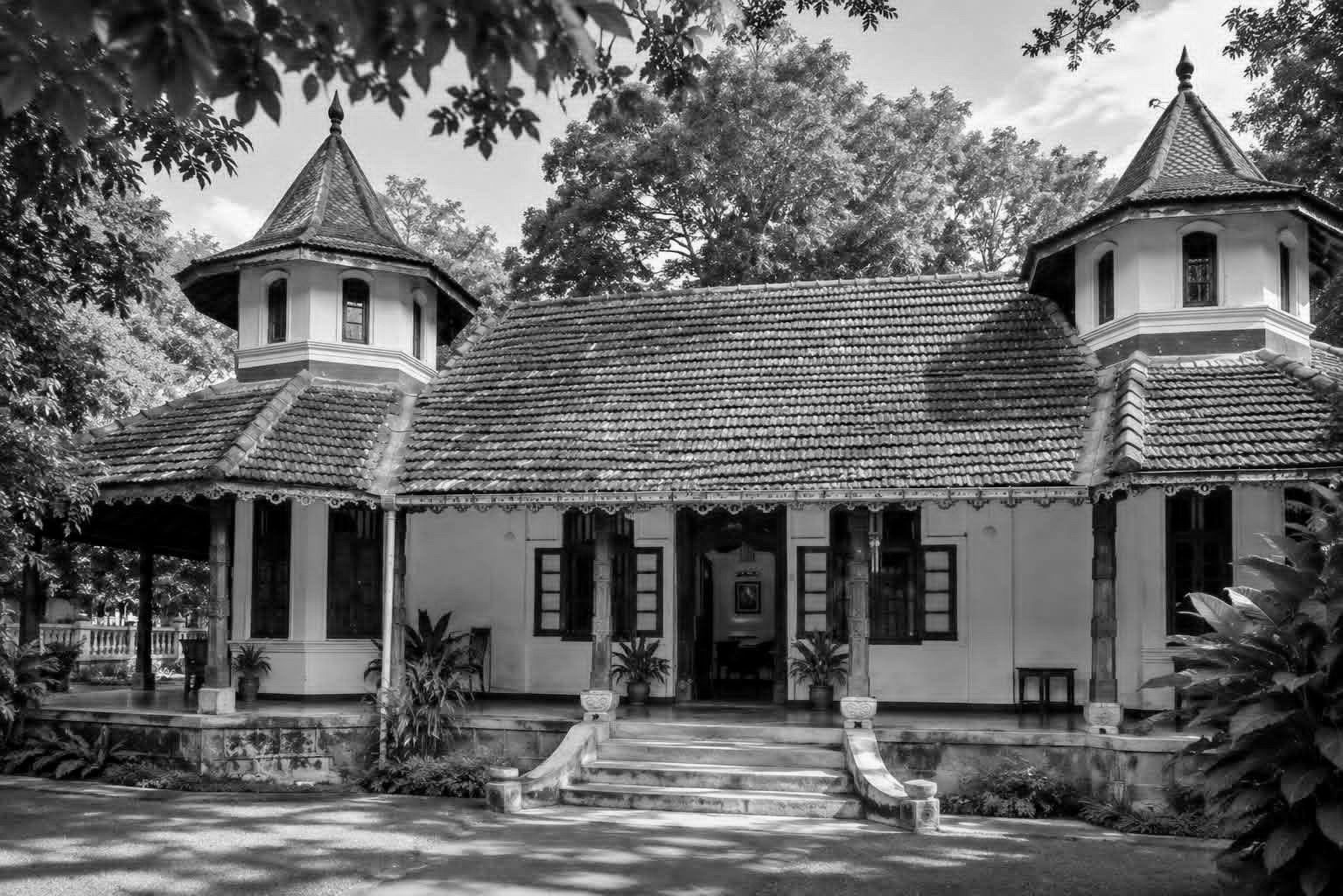
Hostel of Kegalu Balika Vidyalaya, Kegalle. (Buddenipola Walauwa, Kegalle, Sri Lanka now owned by the Government of Sri Lanka was The ancestral home of Sir Edwin Wijeyeratne & Lady Leela Wijeyeratne)

Kegalu Balika Vidyalaya (Sinhala: කෑගලු බලිකා විද්‍යාලය) is a National Buddhist girls' School in Kegalle, Sri Lanka.

The school, the Kegalu Buddhist English Ladies College, was established on 2 November 1943 by the Buddhist Theosophical Society, in response to the prevailing English missionary school system. It was the first Buddhist girls’ school in the Kegalle District. The initial enrolment was seven students, and the founding principal was Anula Udalagama.

== Principals ==
1. Anula Udalagama - 1943/11/02 - 1970/06/23
2. Irini Muthunayake - 1970/06/24 - 1977/10/17
3. Seetha Amarakoon - 1977/10/08 - 1980/05/14
4. Rupa Malawana - 1980/05/15 - 2002/01/04
5. Mallika Ranasinghe - 2002/05/24 - 2009/08/15
6. A. M. U. K. Amarasinghe - 2009/08/19 - 2014/06/02
7. Manel Wasala - 2014/06/03 - 2017/05/18
8. Chandima Himali Thennakoon - 2018/04/05 - 2024/08/31
9. H. A. T. D. K. Jayarathna - 2024/08/01 - present
