= Bhatkhande Sanskriti Vishwavidyalaya =

University in Uttar Pradesh, India

- Former names: Bhatkhande Music Institute Deemed University, Bhatkhande College of Hindustani Music, Marris College of Music
- Type: State university
- Established: 16 April 1926; 100 years ago
- Chancellor: Governor of Uttar Pradesh
- Vice-Chancellor: Mandavi Singh
- Location: Lucknow, Uttar Pradesh, India; 26°51′13″N 80°55′59″E
- Website: bhatkhandeuniversity.ac.in

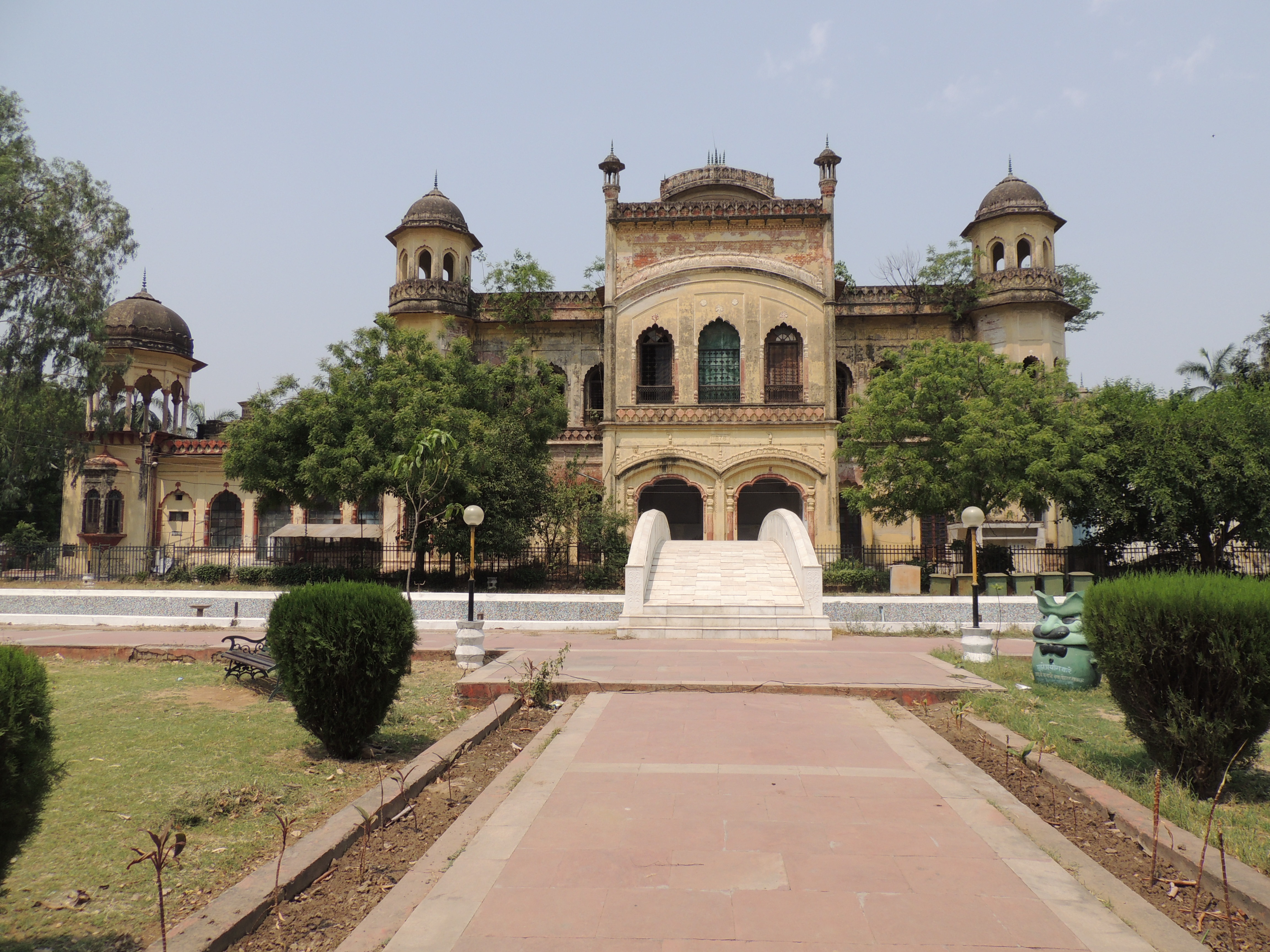
Bhatkhande Sangeet Sansthan Campus

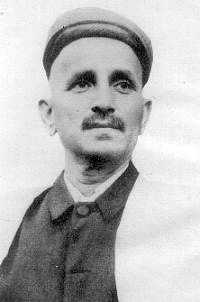
Vishnu Narayan Bhatkhande, co-founder of the institution.

Bhatkhande Sanskriti Vishwavidyalaya (BSV), formerly Bhatkhande Music Institute Deemed University (2000-2022), Bhatkhande College of Hindustani Music (1966-2000) and Marris College of Music (1926-1966), is a state university in Lucknow. Co-founded in 1926 by Vishnu Narayan Bhatkhande, it was declared a deemed university by University Grants Commission (UGC) in 2000, and upgraded into a state university in 2022 by The Bhatkhande Sanskriti Vishwavidyalaya Act, 2022. It offers music education in Vocal Music, Instrumental, Rhythms, Dance, Musicology and Research and Applied Music.

== History ==
The Institute finds its origin in the Marris College of Music, established in 1926 by renowned classical singer and musicologist, Vishnu Narayan Bhatkhande and Rai Umanath Bali with the help of Dr. Raja Rai Rajeshwar Bali (OBE, Ex MLC), taluqdar ruler of Rampur-Dariyabad state (U.P.) and then Minister of Education, Medical Relief & Public Health and Local Self-Government (UP Assembly) of United Provinces, the institution was formally inaugurated by then Governor of United Provinces, Sir William Sinclair Marris, and was also named after him.

Later, on 26 March 1966, the Government of Uttar Pradesh took over the college and renamed it after its founder as Bhatkhande Music College of Hindustani Music, later and now Bhatkhande Music Institute Deemed University, after Government of India through a notification on 24 October 2000, declared the institute a deemed university.

During the 1970s and 1980s, the institute organised annual festivals in which the most eminent of the country's musicians performed. Some of the memorable concerts, that included performances by stars like Ravi Shankar, Amjad Ali Khan, Ustad Zakir Hussain, N Rajam, V.J Jog, Sitara Devi, etc. were part of the Lucknow Festival in the 1970s. During the same period various new courses, like "Thumri" (singer Mrs. Begum Akhtar was the honorary faculty), were introduced.

In 2005, it organised a three-day classical music festival part of the Lucknow Mahotsav.

Primarily teaching vocal, dance, musicology and applied music in Hindustani classical music, the institute also started teaching western classical music in 2009, a move that didn't go well with some chauvinists (not musicians or affiliated to the Institute), who feared that addition of Western classical music could later lead to replacement of Bharatnatyam courses by 'belly dancing.'

In 2022 it was upgraded into a teaching and affiliating state University, and name was changed into Bhatkhande Sanskriti Vishwavidyalaya.

== Departments ==
- Vocal (Gayan)- Classical, Semi-Classical and Light Vocal.
- Instrumental (Vadan)
  - Swaravadya - Sitar, Sarod, Violin, Guitar, Sarangi, Flute and Harmonium or Keyboard.
  - Talavadya - Tabla and Pakhawaj
- Dance (Nritya)
  - Kathak, Bharatnatyam, Manipuri dance and Folk dance.
- Musicology & Research
- Applied Music

The institute offers courses in Vocal Music, Instrumental, Rhythms, Dance, Musicology & Research and Applied Music leading up to: Diploma in Music - 2 years, Bachelor of Performing Arts (B.P.A.) - 3 years, Master of Performing Arts (M.P.A.) - 2 years and Ph.D. Apart from this there are special for the training in Dhrupad-Dhamar, Thumri singing and Light classical music which includes music composition and direction.

== Notable alumni ==
- Leela Desai
- Saraswati Devi, film score composer
- Pt K. G. Ginde - Classical Vocal
- Vijay Patil (RaamLaxman), music director
- Anup Jalota, singer
- Anindita Paul, singer, songwriter and composer
- V. G. Jog
- Kanika Kapoor, singer
- Shanno Khurana
- Talat Mahmood, playback singer
- maestro W. D. Amaradeva, Sri Lankan Singer composed the melody for the National anthem of Maldives
- Nanda Malini, Sri Lankan Singer
- Sujatha Attanayake, Sri Lankan Singer
- Edward Jayakody, Sri Lankan Singer
- Deepika Priyadarshani, Sri Lankan Singer
- Amit Mishra
- Dayarathna Ranatunga, Sri Lankan Singer
- Sumati Mutatkar
- Sanath Nandasiri, Sri Lankan musician
- Kalpana Patowary, playback and folk singer
- Roshan, film score composer
- Sunil Santha, Sri Lankan musician
- Pahari Sanyal, Bengali film-actor
- C. R. Vyas
- Naushad
- Sapna Awasthi
- Shanti Hiranand
- Anurag Bhadouria
- Krishna Bose
- Neeti Mohan
- Malini Awasthi
- Jaya Bhattacharya
- Anupama Raag
- Chinmoy Lahiri
- Raghunath Seth
- Veronika Dassanayaka, dancer and choreographer
- Abhisheka Wimalaweera Sri Lankan Singer

== Notable faculty ==
- S. N. Ratanjankar, principal
- Mohanrao Kallianpurkar
- Ahmed Jan Thirakwa
- Begum Akhtar
- Puru Dadheech
- Shruti Sadolikar

== See also ==
- Bhatkhande Sanskriti Vishwavidyalaya alumni
- Faculty of Fine Arts, University of Lucknow
- Bhartendu Academy of Dramatic Arts
- Indira Kala Sangeet Vishwavidyalaya
- Karnataka State Dr. Gangubhai Hangal Music and Performing Arts University
- Tamil Nadu Music and Fine Arts University
- Raja Mansingh Tomar Music & Arts University
- Manipur University of Culture
