= Umanath Bali =

- Origin: India

Umanath Bali belonged to the erstwhile family of Daryabad in Oudh. He was a Member of Legislative Council of Uttar Pradesh and also represented Barabanki district as the Chairman of its District Board. He was an ardent Congressman and was affiliated with the Indian National Congress.

Along with renowned individuals they established the Bhatkhande Sangit Vidyapith (Bhatkhande Sanskriti Vishwavidyalaya) at Lucknow, an examining and affiliating body that conducts examinations and awards diplomas in Vocal, Instrumental and Indian Classical Dance and Music. Today, the Bhatkhande Sangit Vidyapith is managed by his grandson, Swareshwar Bali under the Presidency of Former Agriculture Minister & Several time Member of parliament, Raja Anand Singh.

Today, the Umanath Bali Auditorium in Lucknow and Umanath Bali Mahila Mahavidyalaya, Daryabad is named after him.

== Family ==
Umanath Bali was survived by four sons and two daughters. His eldest son, Brajeshwar Bali succeeded him as the Vice President of Bhatkhande Sangit Vidyapith.

His grandson, Swareshwar Bali, is now the Vice President of Bhatkhande Sangit Vidyapith. Swareshwar has also been involved in Politics of Barabanki District, changing political parties from time to time. His great-grandson, Sanidhya Sanjai Bali, was actively involved in student and youth politics of the Indian National Congress. Though, he is currently working as a Psephologist, Pollster & Political Strategist under his startup, ARIES.
