= Madhava Ashish =

Scottish-Indian spiritualist, mystic, agriculturist (1920–1997)

Sri Madhava Ashish
- Born: 23 February 1920; Edinburgh, Scotland
- Died: 13 April 1997 (aged 77); Mirtola, Uttarakhand, India
- Other name: Alexander Phipps
- Citizenship: United Kingdom (former); India
- Occupations: Agriculturist; Spiritualist; Mystic writer
- Known for: Spiritualism; Agriculture
- Awards: Padma Shri

Madhava Ashish (1920–1997) was a Scottish-born naturalised Indian spiritualist, mystic, writer and agriculturist, known for his services to Indian agriculture. He was the head of the Mirtola Ashram located in the village of same name, near Almora, in the Indian state of Uttarakhand. He published several articles on the topics of agriculture and ecology of India. He was also the author of four books, What is Man?, Man, The Measure of All Things, Man, Son of Man and An Open Window. The Government of India awarded him the fourth highest civilian honour of the Padma Shri in 1992 for his contributions to the agriculture sector in India.

== Early life and education ==
Madhava Ashish was born Alexander Phipps, on 23 February 1920 at Edinburgh to a Colonel working in the British Indian Army and his early schooling was at Hove and Sherborne. Later, he studied aeronautical engineering at Chelsea Polytechnic and joined Royal Air Force to be based at Doncaster and at Brooklands, Surrey. When World War II started in 1939, Phipps was deputed to India, at a glider manufacturing unit near Dum Dum airport, Kolkata where he is reported to have been engaged in the repairs of Supermarine Spitfire engines.

== Work ==
The turning point in his life reportedly came when, on a vacation in 1944, he had the opportunity to visit Ramana Ashram of Ramana Maharshi, at Tiruvannamalai and known to have come under the influence of the renowned Indian sanyasin. When the war ended the same year, he stayed on in India to continue his spiritual searches. Assisted by Esther Merston, the author of Village Life By the Ganges, he moved to Mirtola Ashram, a spiritual base at the foothills of the Himalayas, near Almora district, in the Kumaon valley. Since then, the ashram, founded in 1929 by Sri Yashoda Mai (full monastic name: Krishna Sevika Sri Sri Yashoda Mai Vairagini) (married name: Monica Devi Chakravarti) (née Monica Roy) (1882–1944) and Krishna Prem (1898–1965), remained his home till his death in 1997.

At the ashram, Phipps submitted to the way of life there, turned into a vegetarian Vaishnav sanyasin, and practised meditation. He also took up the name of Madhava Ashish. When, Krishna Prem, then head of the ashram, died in 1965, he became the head and oversaw the management of the institution till his death. He also involved himself with ecological and environmental issues and started experimenting with agricultural techniques which he passed on to the local farmers. Under his stewardship, the ashram became self-sufficient with own agricultural, dairy and poultry farming. His work is also known to have influenced the government to introduce agriculture as a subject of instruction in the schools in the region. He wrote several articles on agriculture and preservation of ecology. He also wrote three books, What is Man?, Man, Son of Man and An Open Window and co-authored Man, the Measure of All Things, along with Sri Krishna Prem, the sanyasin he succeeded as the head of Mirtola Ashram. The book was started by Sri Krishna Prem but Ashish completed it and the book narrates the life and times of Helena Blavatsky, the co-founder of the Theosophical Society of India.

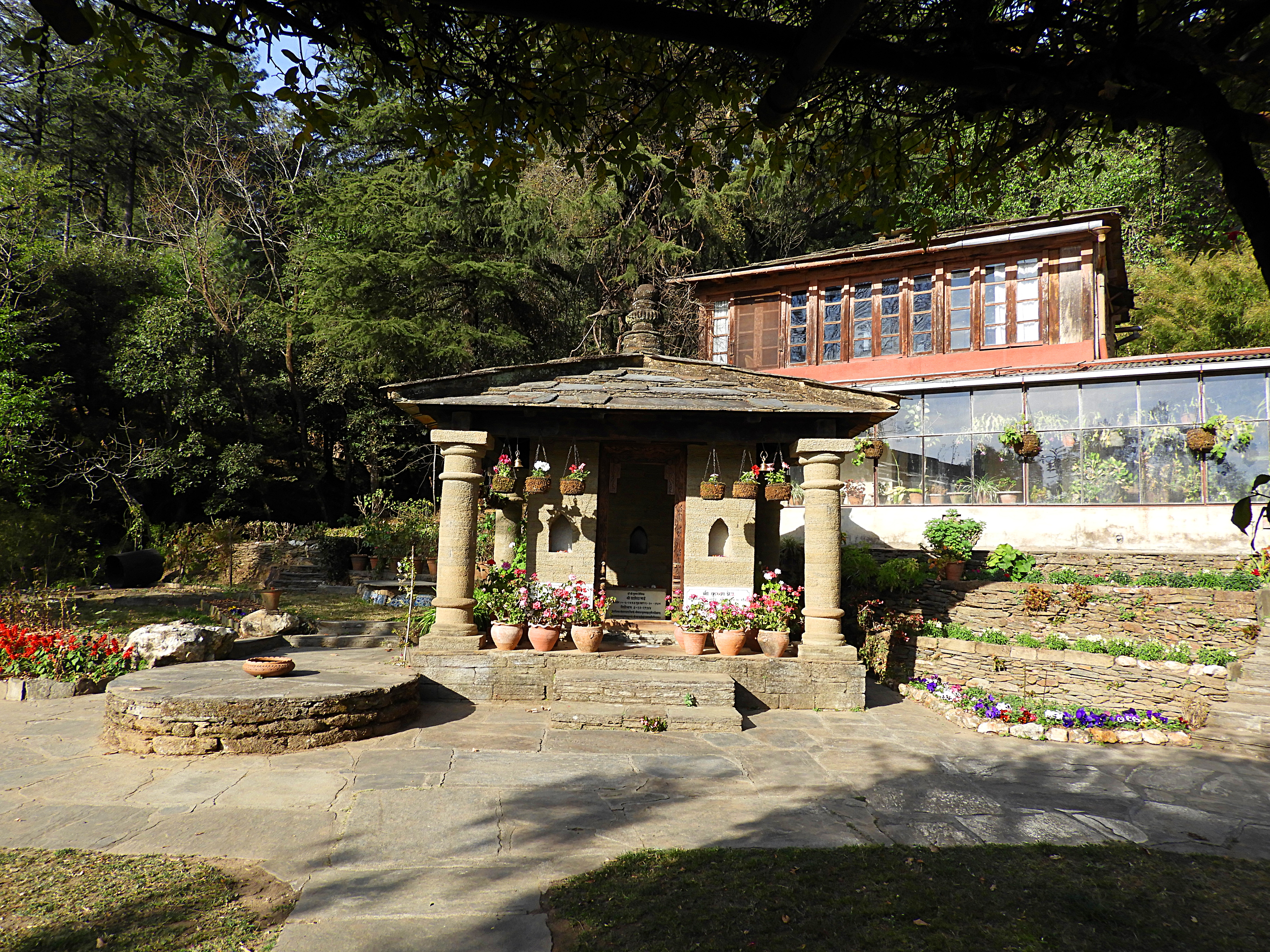
Memorials of Yashoda Ma, Krishna Prem and Madhav Ashish at Mirtola Ashram

His involvement with agriculture and ecology earned him memberships in many committees of the Planning Commission of India. The Government of India awarded him the civilian honour of the Padma Shri in 1992. Five years later, Ashish died on 13 April 1997, succumbing to cancer, which had been troubling him for some time, and was succeeded as head of the ashram by his disciple Dev Ashish. He left behind an unfinished book, the biography of his mentor, Krishna Prem. His life has been the subject of many writings and Masters Speak: An American Businessman Encounters Ashish and Gurdjieff recounts the experiences of Seymour Buddy Ginsburg (b. 27 August 1934), an American businessman and the founder president of Toys R Us, US based children's goods retailer, had with Ashish, during his visit to Mirtola. Guru by Your Bedside: The Teachings of a Modern Seer is a Penguin India publication by Satish Datt Pandey (b. 1930), a biographical account of Ashish which includes details about Mirtola and its spirituality.A Way Within - Seven Year's In A Himalayan Ashram by Madhu Tandan published by Speaking Tiger in December 2023 is a personal account of her stay in Mirtola under Madhava Ashish's tutelage, following his 'soil to soul' philosophy, where every experience was viewed as an opportunity to grow.

== Bibliography ==
- Sri Krishna Prem, Sri Madhava Ashish (1969). Man The Measure of All Things. Quest Books. p. 360. ISBN 978-0835600064.
- Sri Madhava Ashish (1970). Man, Son of Man. Quest Books. p. 352. ISBN 978-0835601139.
- Madhava Ashish (2007). An Open Window. Penguin India. p. 134. ISBN 9780143100232.
- Madhava Ashish (2010). What is Man?. Penguin India. p. 320. ISBN 9780143065746.

== See also ==
- Mirtola
- Ramana Maharshi
- George Gurdjieff
- Helena Blavatsky
