= Venkatamakhin =

Musicologist, composer

Venkatamakhi
- Other names: Venkateswara
- Occupations: Minister; Scholar
- Years active: fl. c. 1630
- Notable work: Chaturdandiprakashika
- Father: Govinda Dikshita

Venkatamakhin (IAST: Veṅkaṭamakhin; fl. c. 1630) or Venkatamakhi, was an Indian poet, musician, and musicologist of Carnatic music. He is renowned for his Chaturdandiprakashika in which he explicates the melakarta system of classifying ragas. Venkatamakhin composed geethams and prabandhas, as well as 24 ashtapadis in praise of Lord Thyagaraja of Tiruvarur.

== Biography ==
Venkatamakhin or Venkateswara Dikshita was the son of the musician, scholar, and priest, Govinda Dikshita, a Kannada Hoysala Karnataka Brahmin from Honnali near Shivamogga, who was also a minister of Raghunatha Nayak of Thanjavur. He was instructed in the veena by his father and his brother, Yagnanarayan. He was later schooled in the scholarly aspects of classical music by Tanappacharya. Venkatamakhin was also versed in Sanskrit and equipped with knowledge in varied subjects such as astrology, logic, philosophy, and alankara.

Like his father, Venkatamakhin served as a minister to Raghunatha Nayak's successor, Vijayaraghava Nayak (r. 1633–1673). Seeing as to how there was no authoritative treatise on the classification of ragas in Carnatic music, the king commissioned Venkatamakhin to compile the Chaturdandiprakashika, his most renowned work. He was devotee of Tyagesha, the presiding deity of Tiruvarur, and composed 24 ashtapadis in his honour.

Venkatamakhin composed the Gita ‘Gandharva Janata’ (Arabhi) in praise of Tanappacharya.

Venkatamakhin's Chaturdandi Prakasika was a landmark in the annals of Carnatic music. It had been in circulation only in manuscript form until it was taken up for print early in the 20th century. It gives a systematic and scientific classification of Mela ragas based on swaras. The name itself means ‘Exposition or illumination of the four channels through which a raga manifests itself’. Out of the ten chapters, the last and part of the ninth are said to be missing. Twelve hundred and odd couplets available are in simple, elegant Sanskrit. His grandson, Muddu Venkatamakhi, added a supplement to the work.

It is said that Venkatamakhin freed himself from thieves by singing ‘Hare Nipidakantaka Dushpradesa’ (Lalita). He cared for his people too and freed them from the order of the ruler to get the symbols of conch and wheel tattooed by singing ‘Sankha Chakranganatyachara re’ (Ritigowla). He has also composed Lakshya Gitas and Prabandhas in Bandira Bhasha.
