= Krishna Prem =

British-born Indian spiritual practitioner (1898–1965)

Sri Krishna Prem
- Krishna Prem in the early 1950s

Personal life
- Born: Ronald Henry Nixon; 10 May 1898 Cheltenham, England
- Died: 14 November 1965 (aged 67) Mirtola, Almora district, India
- Resting place: Krishna Prem's samadhi mandir, Mirtola; 29.64237°N 79.82751°E
- Notable work(s): The Search for Truth, Initiation into Yoga, The Yoga of the Bhagavat Gita, The Yoga of the Kathopanishad
- Education: King's College, Cambridge
- Website: www.mirtolareflections.com

Religious life
- Religion: Hinduism
- Denomination: Vaishnavism
- Temple: Uttar Brindaban ashram, Mirtola
- Sect: Gaudiya Vaishnavism

Religious career
- Teacher: Sri Yashoda Mai

Sri Krishna Prem (10 May 1898 – 14 November 1965), born Ronald Henry Nixon, was a British spiritual aspirant who went to India in the early 20th century. Together with his spiritual teacher Sri Yashoda Mai (1882–1944), he founded an ashram at Mirtola, near Almora, India. He was one of the first Europeans to pursue Vaishnavite Hinduism, and was highly regarded, with many Indian disciples. Later, according to the account of his foremost disciple Sri Madhava Ashish, Krishna Prem transcended the dogmas and practices of the Gaudiya Vaishnava tradition into which he had been initiated and affirmed a universal spiritual path shorn of "orthodoxy" and blind traditionalism.

== Early life ==
Ronald Henry Nixon was born in Cheltenham, England, in 1898, and educated in Taunton. His mother was a Christian Scientist and his father was reportedly in the glass and china business.

At age 18, Nixon became a British fighter pilot in the First World War: he was commissioned as a temporary second lieutenant on probation on 10 May 1917, was confirmed in his rank on 12 June, and was appointed a flying officer in the Royal Flying Corps on 15 June. On one occasion, he experienced an escape from death that he believed was miraculous, in which a "power beyond our ken" saved him from several enemy planes. His experiences of death and destruction during the war filled him with a "sense of futility and meaninglessness". He was transferred to the unemployed list of the Royal Air Force on 11 January 1919 and relinquished his temporary Army commission on 3 December that year.

After the war, Nixon enrolled in King's College, Cambridge, where he studied English literature. During this period Nixon also studied philosophy, and became acquainted with Theosophy, Advaita Vedanta Hinduism, Buddhism, and Pali, and developed an interest in going to India to learn more about the practical aspects of Indian religion.

== Life in India ==
In 1921, while still in England, Nixon accepted the offer of a teaching position at the University of Lucknow, in northern India. As it turned out, the university's vice-chancellor, Gyanendra Nath Chakravarti, was also spiritually inclined and interested in Theosophy, and offered Nixon assistance. Over time, Nixon came to regard Gyanendra's wife, Monica Devi Chakravarti, as his spiritual teacher. In 1928, Monika took vows of renunciation in the Gaudiya Vaishnavite tradition, where these vows are called vairagya. She adopted the monastic name of Sri Yashoda Mai. Soon thereafter, she initiated Nixon into vairagya, and he adopted Krishna Prem as his monastic name.

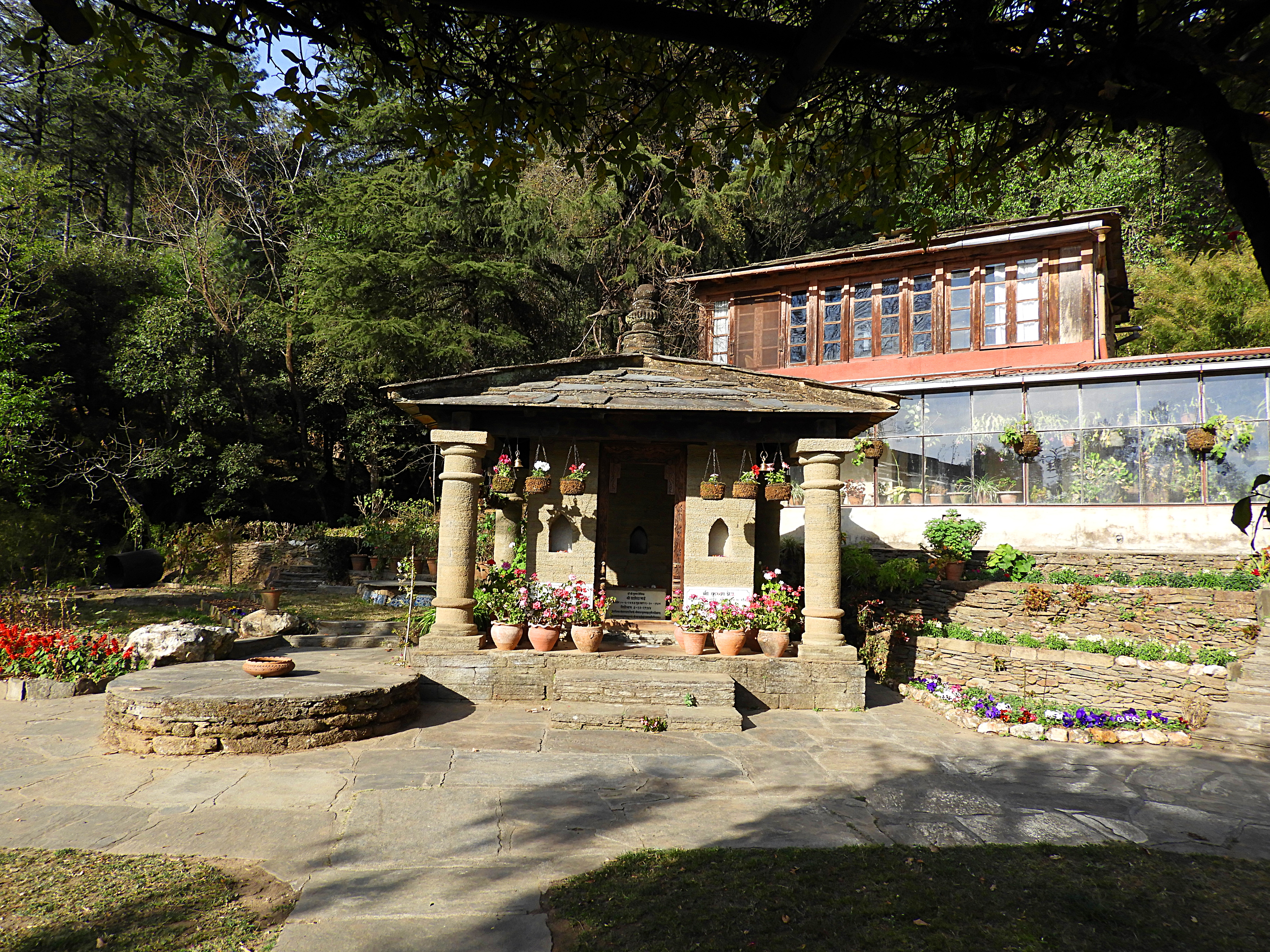
Memorials of Yashoda Mai, Krishna Prem and Madhava Ashish at Mirtola Ashram.

In 1930, Sri Yashoda Mai and Krishna Prem together founded an ashram at Mirtola, near Almora, in mountainous north-central India (state of Uttarakhand). The ashram "began and has continued to be" aligned with strict orthodox Vaishnavism. In 1944, Yashoda Ma died and Krishna Prem succeeded her as head of the ashram. He travelled little, but in 1948 he visited South India, meeting Sri Ramana Maharshi, as well as Sri Aurobindo and Mirra Alfassa ("The Mother"). Sardella states that Nixon appears to have been "the first European to embrace Vaishnavism in India". Haberman states that Nixon "was perhaps the first Westerner to tread the path of Krishna-bhakti, and was certainly the first to have any official affiliation with the Gaudiya Vaishnavism of Braj."

Krishna Prem, despite his English origins, became widely accepted and admired in the Indian Hindu community. Brooks wrote that "Krishna Prem's evident intellectual and inspirational qualities gained him wide fame and many disciples in India, as reflected in numerous books on his life and teachings." Gertrude Emerson Sen wrote that "I know of no other person like Krishnaprem, himself 'foreign' to begin with, who has drawn so many Indians to himself". His biographer Dilip Kumar Roy wrote that Krishnaprem "had given a filip [stimulus] to my spiritual aspiration".

Haberman wrote that Krishna Prem "was recognized as a Hindu saint by many Indians of his day." When Nixon died in 1965, he was hailed by Sarvepalli Radhakrishnan, then president of India, as a "great soul". Nixon's final words were "my ship is sailing".

== Works ==
- Krishna Prem; Madhava Ashish; Karan Singh (2004). Letters from Mirtola. Mumbai, India: Bharatiya Vidya Bhavan. ISBN 9788172763565. OCLC 223080940. (194 pages) (original edition 1938)
- Krishna Prem, Sri (1988). The yoga of the Bhagavat Gita. Shaftesbury, UK: Element. ISBN 9781852300234. OCLC 59891805. ISBN 185230023X (224 pages)
- Krishna Prem, Sri (1976). Initiation into yoga: An introduction to the spiritual life. London: Rider. ISBN 9780091256319. OCLC 2440284. ISBN 0091256313 (128 pages)
- Krishna Prem, Sri; Ashish Madhava (1969). Man, the measure of all things, in the stanzas of Dzyan. London: Rider. ISBN 9780090978700. OCLC 119543. ISBN 0090978706 (360 pages)
- Krishna Prem, Sri (1955). The yoga of the Kathopanishad. London: John M. Watkins. OCLC 14413144. (264 pages)
- Krishna Prem, Swami (1938). The search for truth. Calcutta, India: Book Land. OCLC 35694199. (138 pages)
- Kaul, Narendra Nātha (1980). Writings of Sri Krishna Prem: an introduction. Bombay, India: Bharatiya Vidya Bhavan. OCLC 7730748. (111 pages)

== Biographical sources ==
- Chapple, Jon (2024). Sri Krishna Prem: A Wing and a Prayer (1st ed.). Kirksville, Missouri: Blazing Sapphire Press. ISBN 9781952232886. (316 pages)
- Roy, Dilip Kumar (1992). Yogi Sri Krishnaprem (3rd, revised ed.). Bombay, India: Bharatiya Vidya Bhavan. OCLC 421016835. (312 pages) (original edition, 1968)
- "The Case of Sri Krishna Prem" in Brooks, Charles R. (1989). The Hare Krishnas in India. Motilal Banarsidass. pp. 98–101. ISBN 9788120809390. OCLC 28169795.
- Haberman, David L. (1 July 1993). "A cross‐cultural adventure: The transformation of Ronald Nixon". Religion. 23 (3). Routledge: 217–227. doi:10.1006/reli.1993.1020. ISSN 0048-721X.
- Joneja, G. L. (June 1981). "Yogi Sri Krishnaprem". Yoga Magazine. Bihar School of Yoga. Archived from the original on 6 February 2020.
- "Krishna Prem, Sri (1898–1965) Western-born Vaishnavite Guru" in Jones, Constance; James D. Ryan (2006). Encyclopedia of Hinduism. Infobase Publishing. p. 246. ISBN 9780816075645. OCLC 191044722.
- "Sri Krishna Prem (Ronald Nixon)" in Oldmeadow, Harry (2004). Journeys East: 20th Century Western Encounters with Eastern Religious Traditions. Bloomington, IN, USA: World Wisdom. pp. 70–71. ISBN 9780941532570. OCLC 54843891.
- "Sri Krishna Prem / Ronald Nixon" in Rawlinson, Andrew (1997). The book of enlightened masters: Western teachers in eastern traditions. Chicago: Open Court. pp. 380–384. ISBN 0812693108. OCLC 36900790.
- "Sri Yashoda Ma 1882–1944" (chapter 20) in Chambers, John (2009). The Secret Life of Genius: How 24 Great Men and Women Were Touched by Spiritual Worlds. Inner Traditions / Bear & Co: Inner Traditions. pp. 226–239. ISBN 9781594779268.
