= Shrikrishna Narayan Ratanjankar =

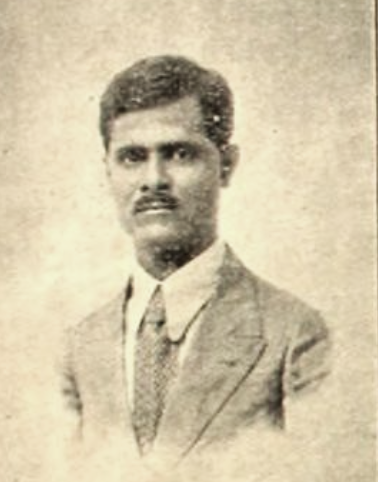

Background information
- Born: 31 December 1899
- Origin: Mumbai
- Died: 14 February 1974 (aged 73–74)
- Genre: Hindustani classical music
- Occupation: Musicologist

Shrikrishna Narayan Ratanjankar (31 December 1899 - 14 February 1974) was a scholar and teacher of Hindustani classical music, from the Agra gharana. Foremost disciple of Vishnu Narayan Bhatkhande and Faiyaz Khan of Baroda State, he also remained principal of Bhatkhande Music Institute (Bhatkande Sangeet Sansthan), Lucknow, for many years, where he trained many noted names in the field of music.

== Early life ==
His father Narayan Govind Ratanjankar was born in Mumbai. Ratanjankar's grandfather, Govindrao came to Mumbai in the middle of the 19th century. After graduation Shrikrishna's father, Narayanrao became a police officer in the then British regime. At the age of 7, S.N.Ratanjankar was trained under the guidance of Krishnam Bhatt of Karwar. He also received instruction from Anant Manohar Joshi (Gwalior gharana) and later under Faiyaz Khan of Agra gharana. In 1911, he started training with musicologist Vishnu Narayan Bhatkhande and is today his most well known disciple. He graduated from Bombay University in 1926. It was his Vishnu Narayan Bhatkhande who sent Ratanjankar to Ustad Faiyaz Khan for a six-year studentship.

== Career ==
In the year 1925, Ratanjankar graduated (BA) from the Wilson College, Mumbai. He was the Principal of Bhatkhande Music University (earlier known as Marris Music College), at Lucknow for several years, and later was appointed Vice-Chancellor at Indira Sangeet Kala Vishva Vidyalaya, Khairagarh, Madhya Pradesh. Later he was once again called to head the Bhatkhande Sangeet Vidyapeeth on a two-year contract. His students include K. G. Ginde, SCR Bhatt, Chidanand Nagarkar, V.G. Jog, Dinkar Kaikini, Shanno Khurana, Sumati Mutatkar, Prabhakar Chinchore, C R Vyas, Chinmoy Lahiri, Yashwant Mahale, S.N.Tripathi, Roshan Lal Nagrath (music director).

As a vocalist he sang Dhrupad and Khayal styles of Agra gharana. A known musicologist like his mentor Bhatkhande, Ratanjankar has more than 800 compositions under his pen name "Sujaan", notated and documented diligently by his disciple K. G. Ginde. He also published books including Geet Manjari, Taan Sangrah, Sangeet Shiksha, and Abhinava Raga Manjari.

He also composed some new ragas such as Marga Bihag, Gopika Basant, Kedar Bahar, Sawani Kedar, Ranjani Kalyan, Hansaranjani, and Salagvarali.

He was appointed Chairman of the Jury of Auditions of AIR (All India Radio) in the mid-1950s.

In 1957 he was awarded the Padma Bhushan by the Government of India, and in 1963 the Sangeet Natak Akademi, India's National Academy for Music, Dance and Drama, awarded him its highest honour for lifetime achievement, the Sangeet Natak Akademi Fellowship.
