= Dilipkumar Roy =

Bengali musician, singer, musicologist, novelist, poet, essayist and yogi

- Born: 22 January 1897; Krishnanagar, Nadia, Bengal Presidency, India (now West Bengal, India)
- Died: 6 January 1980 (aged 82); Pune, India
- Occupations: playwright and musician
- Writing career
- Genres: Drama, song, essay

Dilip Kumar Roy (22 January 1897 – 6 January 1980), also spelt Dilipkumar Roy, was an Indian musician, singer, musicologist, novelist, poet, essayist and yogi. He was the son of Dwijendralal Ray (or Roy). In 1965, the Sangeet Natak Akademi, India's National Academy for Music, Dance and Drama, awarded him its highest honour for lifetime achievement, the Sangeet Natak Akademi Fellowship.

== Early life and education ==
Son of Dwijendralal Ray (1863–1913), the Bengali poet, playwright, and composer, Roy and his younger sister Maya lost their mother Surabala Devi in 1903. On his paternal grandmother's side, the family descended from Vaishnava ascetic Advaita Acharya, one of the apostles of the medieval Bengali saint Shri Chaitanya. His mother Surabala Devi was the daughter of distinguished homeopath physician Pratap Chandra Majumdar.

Since his childhood, Roy had a fascination for Sanskrit, English, chemistry and mathematics. His passion for music stopped him from securing the highest marks in the Matriculation examination: he stood the twenty-first and, with a scholarship, joined the Presidency College of Kolkata. Here he came close to Subhas Chandra Bose. With a first class honours in mathematics, he went to Cambridge in 1919 for a tripos. Shortly before this three-year trip to Europe, in his teens he had come under the personal spell of the musicologist Bhatkhande. Roy had taken advantage of his family background and learnt scores of popular and classical compositions. This forged his determination to embrace music as a vocation. Therefore, in 1920, in addition to the first part of his tripos, he passed also the examination in Western music. Along with his lessons in piano, he grew fluent in French, German and Italian, before leaving for Germany and Italy to pursue his studies in music. Inviting Roy through the International Peace and Freedom Society, Romain Rolland arranged for him a seminar on Indian classical music in Lugano, and had his lectures translated and published in French. At this juncture, Roy met personalities like Bertrand Russell, Hermann Hesse, and Georges Duhamel. From Vienna, invited by president Masaryk, Roy visited Prague, on his way to Budapest, Rome, Florence and Naples, to discover the heart of the tradition of European music. The ancient modes like Ionian, Lydian, Mixolydian, Dorian, Aeolian, and Phrygian, reminded him, respectively, of the Indian that or melakarta ("parent scales") like Bilâval, Iman, Khamâj, Kâfi, Asâvari, and Bhaïravi.

== Romain Rolland ==
In his diary, Inde, Romain Rolland speaks of Roy frequently. He records Roy's first visit on 23 August 1920: "...His is no ordinary intelligence... A young man, tall and well-built, (...) in his complexion the orange-brown of a Créole features, except for the lips..." Talking about his songs, Rolland mentions, "Especially a religious song by Tansen... I find there some affinity with Gregorian melodies and, furthermore, with the Greek hymns that had been at the very source (...)" And Rolland goes on: "By listening to the popular melodies one is better able to grasp the pure and natural genius of the Hindu race. Dilipkumar Roy sings some of them, so charmingly, delicately, cheerfully, poetically, exhibiting such a mastery of rhythm - that they could just as well be popular songs of our own (...) One realizes - how popular art admits far fewer boundaries than sophisticated art." And about Dilip's voice: "He sings with nasal intonations and his voice reaches quite high, with a singular suppleness in the ceaseless blossoming of vocal improvisations and ornaments..." On 24 October 1927, Romain Rolland describes another visit from Roy: "He belongs to a type which is the best of aristocratic India." On listening to an old hymn to the goddess Kali sung by Roy, Rolland mentions: "It is simply captivating, an overflow of passion that implores, laments, reaches fever pitch, subsides, from soprano to bass notes (...) and begins again, with doubled and exacting ecstasy..."

== Experiments in music ==
While in Europe, Roy realised "the greatness and the deficiency" of Indian classical music as practiced by his contemporaries. Instead of mediocre word - supports to elaborate melodic and rhythmic compositions, Roy was convinced that the modern Indian languages, the daughters of Sanskrit, could provide more adequate lyrics for the classical models (as demonstrated by composers like his own father or Tagore, among others). Back in India, he joined Bhatkhande and, following the latter's methodology, he set to travelling widely, collecting and publishing serial notes on raga-variants from regional masters, with notations of specific compositions. He took lessons from musicians like Abdul Karim, Faiyaz Khan, Chandan Chaube, Gaurishankar Mishra, Surendranath Majumdar, and Hafiz Ali Khan. In his works, bhramyaman ('Globe-trotting'), sangitiki ('About Music'), gitashri ('Song as an Art') etc., he recorded in detail his experiences, illustrated by notations. Like Bhatkhande and his pupil Ratanjankar, Roy wrote and demonstrated how Indian classical music could be taught on a purely academic basis, with a syllabus, somewhat demystifying the shrouded master-to-disciple secrecy. As an outspoken music critic, he attained considerable fame, especially in his analysis of the sacrosanct Gurus. His first-hand experience, enhanced by his deep investigation and reflections, opened a new horizon in the domain of thinking, practising and teaching music.

== Embracing the Cosmic Soul ==
Whereas the very ancient Indian tradition of lieder-like lyrics, passing through the 9th century carya-pada songs, admitted and encouraged the tana (improvised musical phrases), Tagore, who had composed more than 2000 lyrics, wanted to individualise his compositions in the European way and protect their execution according to an authorised notation. An expert of the tana and phrase-variations, Roy had sought and obtained Tagore's permission to interpret the latter's songs as he wished. Composing songs in Sanskrit, Bengali, Hindi and English, keeping intact some popular or classical melodies even from Russian, German, Italian or French music, he had the rare facility of passing from one language to another, while interpreting them.

Among the paramount contributions of Roy, is an Indian type of opera, based on the traditional model of the kirtana: this involves an emotional catharsis through a succession of modal and rhythmic patterns, compatible with the classical schools of Indian dance. After a long discussion with Tagore on the subtleties of Bengali prosody, Roy saw the aged poet dedicating him the former's study on the subject, chhanda. Requested by the University of Calcutta, Roy himself also wrote a treatise on the subject, chhandasiki. In one of his letters to Roy, the poet admitted : "I have a sincere affection for you. My heart is attracted by your unmixed truthfulness and frankness." Roy was admired by listeners like Sri Aurobindo and Tagore. In the 1940s, a hit film in Hindi flooded the country with the songs of Mirabai, the princess-saint of medieval India. Though they were sung by Bharat Ratna M.S. Subbulakshmi, they had all been collected or composed by Roy. In homage to her teacher, Subbulakshmi has written that when Dilip "sings (...), it is an outpouring of the individual soul, yearning to be embraced by the cosmic soul." . In the late 1930s Subbulakshmi and Roy sang two songs together, Vande Mataram and Dhano Dhanya Pushpe Bora.

Roy created his own style of fiction, involved in a constant psychological analysis. Most of his characters are mystic or spiritual in their essence, situated at a meeting point between the East and the West. As a poet, instead of following the melodic lyrical style developed by Tagore, Roy followed the harmonic structure created by Michael Madhusudan Dutta and brought up to-date by his father Dwijendralal Ray.

== Later years and death ==
After a second visit to Europe, in 1928 Roy settled at the Ashram of Sri Aurobindo in Pondicherry. His imposing correspondence with Sri Aurobindo reveals a hitherto unknown aspect of the Master who declared cherishing him "like a friend and a son". In the early 50s, two patriotic songs composed by Roy ("Ham bharatke" and "Nishan uncha, kadam badha") appealed to the General Cariappa, who wanted to include them in the official list of marching songs for the Indian Army.

In 1953, on returning from a world tour, accompanied by his disciple Indira Devi, he founded the Hari Krishna Mandir in 1959 at Pune. Roy co-authored an autobiographical book titled Pilgrims of the Stars with Indira Devi. Pilgrims of the Stars offers the reader a glimpse into the daily struggles and victories of two great souls. East West Journal stated that the book was, "...as remarkable as it is rewarding for the reader." The book has been translated into Gujarati (translator Ramaṇalāl Sonī; Amadāvāda: Vorā, 1977; and Rājakoṭa: Pravīna Pustaka Bhanḍāra, 1991).

Honoured by the Sanskrit Academy of Kolkata as the 'Source of the Nectar of Melody' (sura-sudhâkara), Roy was elected member of the Indian State Academy of Fine Arts. He was the author of more than 50 records (several of them are still reprinted by Saregama, previously known as His Master's Voice); 8 volumes of songs with notation; 21 volumes in English and 46 in Bengali containing novels, poems, plays, epistles, reminiscences and essays.

Roy died in Hari Krishna Mandir, Pune on 6 January 1980.
