= K. G. Ginde =

Krishna Gundopant Ginde
- Also known as: K G Ginde
- Born: 26 December 1925
- Origin: Bailhongal, Belgaum District, Karnataka, India
- Died: 13 July 1994 (aged 68) Kolkata, West Bengal, India
- Genres: Hindustani classical music, Musicologist
- Occupation: Vocalist
- Years active: 1936–1994

Krishna Gundopant Ginde, better known as K.G. Ginde (26 December 1925 – 13 July 1994) was an Indian classical singer and teacher. His guru S N Ratanjankar was his biggest influence.

== Biography ==
Ginde, called "Chhotu" (small) by family members and close friends because he was the 8th among 9 children, was born on 26 December 1925, in Bailhongal, near Belgaum. When he was just 11 years old, he moved to Lucknow and started his music training under music scholar S N Ratanjankar at Marris College of Music (now Bhatkhande Sanskriti Vishwavidyalaya)

He moved to Mumbai in 1951 to take up a teaching post with Bharatiya Vidya Bhavan. In 1962 he became principal of Vallabh Sangeet Vidyalaya.

On his sixtieth birthday, some of the biggest names in Hindustani music, including Bhimsen Joshi, Kumar Gandharva, and Purushottam Laxman Deshpande, graced the function.

Ginde died on 13 July 1994, age 68 in Calcutta after suffering a massive heart attack.
