= Gyanendra Nath Chakravarti =

Indian Theosophist (1861–1936)

Rai Bahadur Gyanendra Nath Chakravarti
- জ্ঞানেন্দ্র নাথ চক্রবর্তী
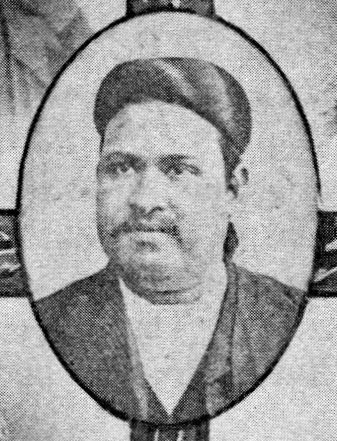
- Portrait of G. N. Chakravarti
- Appointed by: Harcourt Butler, Governor of United Provinces

Personal details
- Born: January 1, 1861 Benares, North-Western Provinces, Company Raj (now Varanasi, India)
- Died: October 7, 1936 (aged 75) Lucknow, United Provinces of Agra and Oudh, British India (now in Uttar Pradesh, India)
- Spouse: Monica Devi Chakravarti ('Yashoda Mai')
- Children: 4 biological, 40 adopted
- Education: LL.B., M.A.
- Alma mater: University of Calcutta
- Occupation: Academic Administrator

Gyanendra Nath Chakravarti (January 1, 1861 – October 7, 1936), also known as G.N. Chakravarti, was an Indian theosophist and scholar. In 1893, he lectured at the World's Parliament of Religions in Chicago.

== Early life and education ==
Chakravarti received his early education at a missionary school in Banaras. He studied at the University of Calcutta and earned a Bachelor's Degree in Law and a Master's Degree in Arts.

== Career ==
Chakravarti began his career as a lecturer in physical science at a college in Bareilly, Uttar Pradesh. In 1893, he was appointed as Professor of Mathematics at the University of Allahabad. During his time at university, he became friends with Motilal Nehru. Later, he served as the Chief Inspector of Schools in the United Provinces.

He was appointed the first Vice-Chancellor of the University of Lucknow on December 16, 1920, after previously serving as pro-vice-chancellor at Banaras Hindu University.

=== Theosophical Society ===
Chakravarti was introduced to the Theosophical Society by his uncle and became a member of the organization.

In 1893, the Theosophical Society sent a delegation to the World's Parliament of Religions in Chicago that included Chakravarti and Annie Besant. After traveling to England, he sailed for the U.S. in August 1893 with Besant to meet with American Theosophists to organize lectures.

== Reception ==
Chakravarti was awarded the title and medal of "Rai Bahadur" by the British colonial administration. The Dr. Chakravarti Gold Medal is awarded annually at the University of Lucknow for "social service contributions."

== Writings ==
The Union Index of Theosophical Periodicals lists two articles by or about Chakravarti.

- The Influence of Theosophy on the Life and Teachings of Modern India. 1906. Adyar Pamphlet Series No. 35. Reviewed in The Theosophic Messenger 7.8 (May 1906), 124.
- Spirituality and Psychism. 1914. Adyar Pamphlet Series, No. 48

== Personal life ==
Chakravarti was married to Monica Devi Chakravarti (1882–1944). The couple had four biological children and forty adopted children. In 1928, Monika Devi sought her husband's permission to take sannyasa (renunciant vows) and continue her spiritual endeavors in the Himalayas. He granted her request and personally initiated her into a renunciant order, where she assumed the name Sri Yashoda Ma.
