= List of Yuva Puraskar winners for Malayalam =

List of winners of a literary honor in India

Part of a series on

Sahitya Akademi Awards
Category
Sahitya Akademi Award winners by language
- Assamese
- Bengali
- Bodo
- Dogri
- English
- Gujarati
- Hindi
- Kannada
- Kashmiri
- Konkani
- Maithili
- Malayalam
- Marathi
- Meitei (Manipuri)
- Nepali
- Odia
- Punjabi
- Rajasthani
- Sanskrit
- Santali
- Sindhi
- Tamil
- Telugu
- Urdu
Sahitya Akademi Translation Prizes
- Assamese
- Bengali
- Bodo
- Dogri
- English
- Gujarati
- Hindi
- Kannada
- Kashmiri
- Konkani
- Maithili
- Malayalam
- Marathi
- Meitei (Manipuri)
- Nepali
- Odia
- Punjabi
- Rajasthani
- Sanskrit
- Santali
- Sindhi
- Tamil
- Telugu
- Urdu
Sahitya Akademi Yuva Puraskar
- Assamese
- Bengali
- Bodo
- Dogri
- English
- Gujarati
- Hindi
- Kannada
- Kashmiri
- Konkani
- Maithili
- Malayalam
- Meitei (Manipuri)
- Marathi
- Nepali
- Odia
- Punjabi
- Rajasthani
- Sanskrit
- Santali
- Sindhi
- Tamil
- Telugu
- Urdu
Sahitya Akademi Bal Sahitya Puraskar
- Assamese
- Bengali
- Bodo
- Dogri
- English
- Gujarati
- Hindi
- Kannada
- Kashmiri
- Konkani
- Maithili
- Malayalam
- Meitei (Manipuri)
- Marathi
- Nepali
- Odia
- Punjabi
- Rajasthani
- Sanskrit
- Santali
- Sindhi
- Tamil
- Telugu
- Urdu
Related
- Eighth Schedule to the Constitution of India
- Official Languages Commission
- List of languages by number of native speakers in India

Yuva Puraskar is given each year to young writers for their outstanding works in the 24 languages, since 2011.

== Recipients ==
Following is the list of recipients of Yuva Puraskar for their works written in Malayalam. The award comprises a cash prize of Rs. 50,000 and an engraved copper plaque.

| Year | Author | Work | Genre | References |
|---|---|---|---|---|
| 2011 | Susmesh Chandroth | Marana Vidyalayam | short stories | |
| 2012 | Lopamudra R. | Parasparam | Poetry | |
| 2013 | P. V. Shajikumar | Vellaroppadam | short stories | |
| 2014 | Indu Menon | Chumbanasabdatharavali | short stories | |
| 2015 | Aryambika S. V. | Thonniyapoloru Puzha | poetry | |
| 2016 | Soorya Gopi | Uppumazhayile Pachilakal | short stories | |
| 2017 | Aswathy Sasikumar | Josephinte Manam | Short stories | |
| 2018 | Amal Pirappancode | Vyasanasamuchayam | novel | |
| 2019 | Anuja Akathoottu | Amma Urangunnilla | poetry | |
| 2020 | Abin Joseph | Kallyassery Thesis | short stories | |
| 2021 | Mobin Mohan | Jacaranda | Novel | |
| 2022 | Anagha J. Kolath | Mezhukuthirikku Swantham Theeppetti | Poetry collection | |
| 2023 | Ganesh Puthur | Achante Alamara | Poetry | |
| 2024 | Shyamkrishnan R. | Meeshakkallan | Short Stories | |
| 2025 | Akhil P. Dharmajan | Ram C/o Anandhi | Novel | |

== See also ==
- List of Sahitya Akademi Award winners for Malayalam
- List of Sahitya Akademi Translation Prize winners for Malayalam
