= Sufi Paranja Katha (film) =

- Directed by: Priyanandanan
- Based on: Sufi Paranja Katha by K. P. Ramanunni
- Produced by: Silicon Media
- Starring: Thampi Antony; Prakash Bare; Babu Antony; Sharbani Mukherjee; Samvrutha Sunil; Geetha Vijayan
- Cinematography: K. G. Jayan
- Edited by: Venugopal
- Music by: Mohan Sithara
- Production company: Chithranjali
- Distributed by: Central Pictures
- Release date: 19 February 2010
- Running time: 125 minutes
- Country: India
- Language: Malayalam

Sufi Paranja Katha is a 2010 Indian Malayalam-language film directed by Priyanandanan based on K. P. Ramanunni's novel with the same title. Ramanunni himself wrote the story, screenplay, and dialogues for the film. Thampi Antony, Prakash Bare, and Sharbani Mukherjee did the main roles in this film. The film has been distributed by Central Pictures. It is widely regarded as one of the defining movies of the Malayalam New Wave.

== Plot ==
This film is a narrative by Sufi, a Muslim scholar.

Karthy belongs to a prestigious Hindu Tharavad. She falls in love with a Muslim trader named Mamootty and starts living in Mamootty's house after converting to Islam. But she doesn't give up her original beliefs of her original religion Hinduism. To save Karthy from the need to go to the temple, Mamootty builds one inside his house. When the local Muslim people learns of this, they create problems, causing the couple to move apart.

== Cast ==
- Sharbani Mukherjee as Karthi, Suhara
- Thampi Antony as Sanku Menon
- Prakash Bare as Mamootty
- Jagathy Sreekumar as Avaru Musaliar
- V. K. Sreeraman as Saidu Mullah
- Babu Antony as Sufi
- Augustine as Putthan Adhikari
- Indrans as Velayi
- Irshad as Beeran
- Vineeth Kumar as Writer
- Mullanezhi as Vaidyar
- K. B. Venu as Kesava Menon
- Aliyar
- Samvrutha Sunil as Young woman at Jaram
- Hima Shankar as Parukutty
- Sona Nair as Beeyatthu
- Geetha Vijayan as Meenakshi
- Valsala Menon as Grandmother
- Sunitha Nedungadi as Ayisha

== Writing ==
Ramanunni says he had no intention of making the novel into a film. But producer, Kalam Karasseri, had wanted to do a film based on it for years and Ramanunni complied. Ramanunni says he has not deviated much from the novel and wrote the script with a lot of care as it dealt with a sensitive theme. "In order to enhance cinematic effects, only one small portion of the story has been done away with and the anti-colonial sentiments have been highlighted. The dialogues of the film celebrate the co-existence of different religions," says Ramanunni.

== Awards ==
It was one of three Indian films selected for International competition section of the 2010 edition of the International Film Festival of Kerala (IFFK). It won four Kerala State Film Awards.

- Kerala State Film Award for Best Cinematography - KG Jayan
- Kerala State Film Award for Best Lyrics - Rafeeq Ahammed (Thekkini Kolaaya)
- Kerala State Film Award for Best Music Director - Mohan Sithara (Thekkini Kolaaya)
- Kerala State Film Award for Best Processing - Chithranjali

== Songs ==
The film has two songs written by Rafeeq Ahammed, with music by Mohan Sithara.

1. "Thekkini Kolaaya Chumaril": K. S. Chithra, Sunil. Mohan Sithara won the 2009 Kerala State Film Award for Best Music Director and Rafeeq Ahammed the Kerala State Film Award for Best Lyrics for this song.
2. "Saayam Sandhye Neerum Thiri Pol": Latha Krishna
