= Mazha =

2000 Malayalam-language film

- Theatrical release poster
- Directed by: Lenin Rajendran
- Written by: Lenin Rajendran
- Based on: Nashtappetta Neelambari by Madhavikkutty
- Produced by: G. Harikumar
- Starring: Biju Menon; Samyuktha Varma; Lal; Thilakan
- Cinematography: S. Kumar
- Edited by: Beena Paul; B. Ajithkumar
- Music by: Songs: Ravindran; Score: Biju
- Production company: Millenium Cinema Productions
- Distributed by: Murali Films; Aakash Films; Thanoof Films
- Release date: 4 August 2000
- Country: India
- Language: Malayalam

Mazha (transl. Rain) is a 2000 Indian Malayalam-language drama film written and directed by Lenin Rajendran based on the short story Nashtappetta Neelambari by Madhavikkutty. It stars Biju Menon, Samyuktha Varma, and Lal. The musical score was composed by Biju and the songs were composed by Ravindran. The film won five Kerala State Film Awards, a National Film Award, and a South Filmfare Award.

== Plot ==
Mazha is the love story of Bhadra (Samyuktha Varma) and her music teacher, Sastrigal (Biju Menon). A teenaged Bhadra coming to learn music from Sastrigal and gets infatuated with him and his singing in Sivapuram. The story describes her character and behavior in a nice mood. In her teenage years, Sivapuram is a beautiful village inhabited by Tamil Brahmins, including the shasthrikal. She falls in love with her music teacher (shasthrikal) because of her young age and curiosity towards his music.

The story runs in the surroundings of the famous Meenakshi Amman Temple in Tamil Nadu. Bhadra's creative talents for poetry starts to flourish under his influence. Sastrigal is not much aware of Bhadra's love and considers her only as his talented student. Coming to know about Bhadra's infatuation, her parents take her with them, and Sastrigal is obliged to marry his fiancée(Sindhu).

Bhadra becomes a doctor (like her father) and is married to Chandran (Lal), who is a computer engineer. Chandran happens to see her diary one day, and the relationship goes for a toss. Of course, there are no names in the diary. So he goes on to doubt every male in her life – including the elderly senior doctor Thilakan. He becomes a victim of his drinking and dies of a related illness.

In the end, Bhadra sets out in search of Sastrigal to Madurai, where she discovers that Sastrigal also has lost much – his wife is a mental patient. The final shock is when she finds out that Sastrigal has lost his beautiful voice to cancer.

== Cast ==
- Samyuktha Varma as Dr. Bhadra Nair
- Biju Menon as Ramanuja Sasthrigal
- Lal as Chandran
- Sindhu Shyam as Jnanam
- Thilakan as Dr.
- Devi Ajith as Gayathri
- Urmila Unni as Saraswathy Madhavan Nair
- Jagathy Sreekumar as vaikunda Shastrikal

== Music ==
The film's score was composed by Biju and the nine songs featured in the film were composed by Ravindran. The lyrics were by Bharathiyar, Kaithapram Damodaran Namboothiri, O. V. Usha, Yusuf Ali Kecheri, and K. Jayakumar.

#	Title	Singer(s)	Raga(s)	Lyricist
1	"Ithramel Manamulla"	K. J. Yesudas	Mohanam	K. Jayakumar
2	"Manjinte"	K. S. Chitra	Bageshri	K. Jayakumar
3	"Geyam Harinaamadheyam"	K. J. Yesudas, Arundhathi, Neyyattinkara Vasudevan	Charukesi	Yusuf Ali Kecheri
4	"Himashaila"	K. J. Yesudas, K. S. Chitra, Arundhathi	Neelambari, Kharaharapriya, Kalyanavasantam	Kaithapram Damodaran Namboothiri
5	"Vaarmukile"	K. S. Chitra	Jog	Yusuf Ali Kecheri
6	"Aashaadham"	K. J. Yesudas, K. S. Chitra	Amrithavarshini	K. Jayakumar
7	"Paarukkulle Nalla Naadu"	Neyyattinkara Vasudevan	Jonpuri	Bharathiyar
8	"Aaraadyam"	Asha G. Menon	Mohanam	O. V. Usha
9	"Himashaila"	K. J. Yesudas	Neelambari, Kharaharapriya, Kalyanavasantam	Kaithapram Damodaran Namboothiri

== Reception ==
Despite positive reviews, the film was a commercial failure.

According to Arun of The Indian Express, "it's due to the phenomenal success of Narasimham. Its massive success cast a gigantic shadow that devoured the entire Malayalam film industry. Well almost "The Narasimham hangover is terrifically strong and it has, at least for the moment, killed the prospects of good films. I don't see any other reason for the failure of well made female-oriented films like Mazha and Madhuranombarakkattu."

== Awards ==
National Film Awards

- Best Lyricist: Yusufali Kechery

Kerala State Film Awards

- Best Actress: Samyuktha Varma
- Best Lyrics: O. V. Usha
- Best Background Score: Biju Paulose
- Best Singer: Asha G. Menon
- Best Sound Recordist: N. Hari Kumar

Asianet Film Awards

- Best Actress : Samyuktha Varma
- Best Lyrics : O V Usha & Jayakumar
- Music Direction : Raveendran
- Best Female Playback Singer : K S Chithra
- Voice of the year : Asha G Menon
- Best Supporting Actor : Biju Menon

Filmfare Awards South

- Best Malayalam Actress : Samyuktha Varma
