= Jisha Abhinaya =

Indian woman playwright and theatre director

- Born: Alappuzha, Kerala, India
- Occupations: Playwright , theatre director, Theatre actress,Jouranalist
- Spouse: Anil Kumar
- Children: Abhinaya
- Parents: Jayan Chetthallur (father); Usha (mother)
- Awards: Kerala Sahitya Akademi Award for Drama (2019)

Jisha Abhinaya is an Indian theatre artist, theatre director and playwright from Kerala. Jisha's collection of eight plays, Eli Eli Lama Sabakthani, won the Kerala Sahitya Akademi Award for Drama in 2019.

== Biography ==
Jisha was born in Thrissur, Kerala, to Jayan Chetthallur and Usha, both of whom are theatre artists. She started her career in drama by portraying a tribal girl named Chomi in an amateur drama competition organized by Kozhikode Kala while studying in 5th class. She won the award for best child actress for that character.

Jisha and her husband Anil Sincere have one daughter, Abhinaya.

== Career ==
Jisha Abhinaya runs a theatre group, 'Abhinaya Nataka Samithi', in Thrissur. Jisha who is also a journalist is a sub-editor in Deshabhimani.

== Plays ==
The play, Eli, Eli, lama sabachthani, written and directed by Jisha is themed after the biblical prayer that begins, "My God, my God, why hast Thou forsaken me?" and features a girl named Anna as the central character. In the play Ente Shareeramaanu Ente Swathantryam [meaning:My Body is My Freedom], the characters are Sugandhi, a flower vendor, Sheela, a cleaner, and Kanchana, a sex worker. The play Otta, which tells the story of Parimalam and her husband Madhavan, focuses on the selfishness and ego of men. The play Shyama Madhavam is based on Prabha Varma's poetry, which evaluates Krishna as a human being. The play is set in the backdrop of the Tholpavakoothu. The play Suryasomapookkal Vitarumbol is a work against the demonstrative devotional industry and godmen. The play Mulanavukaratodu Chila Suvisheshangal is about lives of people where even the body is no longer one's own.

Savithri, a solo play written, directed, and performed by Jisha Abhinaya, centers on a woman who guards a cemetery and communicates with the dead. Using this setting she communicates about social injustice and the blame often placed on women.

Her one-act play, Avan /Aval [meaning:He/She], is a play that reveals insights into the life of a transgender person. Her play Farida won the award for best playwriting at the M.G. Soman Foundation Drama Festival.

== Books published ==
- Eli Eli Lama Sabakthani [My God, my God, why hast Thou forsaken me?] (in Malayalam). Fabian Books. 2019. Collection of 8 plays.

== Awards ==
Jisha's collection of eight plays, Eli Eli Lama Sabakthani, won the Kerala Sahitya Akademi Award for Drama in 2019. 'Eli Eli Lama Sabaktani' also received the 2017 Edasseri Award, and the 2019 Muthukulam Parvathy Amma Award. She won the VSNS Kavunkara Bhargavi Award for best playwriting in the state-level playwriting competition organized by the state level women's drama society called 'Vanithasahithi Samsthana Nataka Sangam (VSNS)' in 2026.
