= Muthukulam Parvathy Amma =

Indian writer and social reformer

- Born: 28 January 1904; Muthukulam, Alappuzha district, British India
- Died: 15 September 1977 (aged 73)
- Occupations: Writer, social reformer
- Parents: P. Rama Panicker (father); Velumbiamma (mother)
- Writing career
- Language: Malayalam

Muthukulam Parvathy Amma (1904–1977) was a Malayalam language poet, teacher, translator, freedom fighter and social reformer from Kerala, India. She published books in various genres of literature, including poetry, short poems, plays, short stories, children's literature, translations and biographies. Parvathy Amma, a follower of Narayana Guru, supported the Indian freedom struggle, and was inclined towards the Indian National Congress. Muthukulam Parvathy Amma Award is a literary award given to woman writers.

== Biography ==
Muthukulam Parvathy Amma was born on Thursday, January 28, 1904, as the youngest daughter of Ramapanicker from Thattakkattussery house in Muthukulam, and Velumbiamma of Nallanikkal Kandathil house in Arattupuzha, in present-day Alappuzha district of Kerala. Ramapanicker an astrologer by profession was also a progressive thinker. Even during the time untouchability in Kerala, he copied and wrote down the Hindu epics Ramayana and Mahabharata and distributed to many. When Parvathy was one and a half years old, her father died.

Her subsequent life was full of hardship. They were not likely to get the family share of her father, according to the common law of that time. Therefore, they moved from Thattakattussery to a little property and a small house that they had previously acquired. There were hardships at home, but her older brother raised her in a way that didn't affect her at all. Parvathy's primary education was at Muthukulam Varanapalli Primary School and Keerikad School. The upper-caste students did not like to sit close to the dark and thin Parvathy because of her caste and appearance. She was able to continue in class only because the law allowed it. She also studied under Krishnan Nair of Muthukulam.

Parvati Amma studied Sanskrit from Sanskrit scholars Chepad Achyutavariyar, Chalil Veluvasan and Padmanabhapanikar. She attained scholar status after studying Sanskrit poems from Sriramodantham to Kumarasambhavam Raghuvansham Magham. This later helped her poetry writing. When she joined VH School in Kollam, she met poets Mary John Thottam, Mundakkal Lakshmi and Mayyanad Lakshmi. They used to write letters to each other in verse. After passing the ninth standard, Parvathy took up teaching career. Then she also passed the Vdwan and Visharad examinations from the University of Madras. She also acquired a general knowledge of Hindi, Tamil, and Bengali languages during this time.

Parvathy Amma, a follower of Narayana Guru wanted to establish a sangha (group) of women followers of the Guru. The Mahila Ashram (ashram for women) she wanted to set up was a refuge like that which existed for the Buddhist nuns.

Parvati Amma, who supported the Indian freedom struggle, was inclined towards the Indian National Congress. She campaigned for the Congress party in the 1960 general elections and traveled all over Kerala, speaking at various meetings. The play Save India written by her for the election campaign was performed allover the Kerala. She also took part in the struggles related to the Vaikom Satyagraha.

The women of Muthukulam have long wanted a maternity ward at the Muthukulam Public Health Center. Parvati Amma is one of the prominent people who worked to make this possible. She was a great propagandist of Gandhian ideas and actively participated in anti-alcohol activities and wrote and preached extensively to educate the people about the evils of alcoholism.

Parvathi Amma, who was also a dancer, was the headmistress at the Harippad Government Girls' School when she composed the Kayarupinni Thiruvathira, a modification of traditional Thiruvathira dance.

She died on 15 September 1977.

== Literary career ==
Started writing poetry at the age of twelve, Parvathy Amma's first work named Yathartha jeevitham (meaning:real life) was published in T. C. Kalyaniyamma's Sharda, a women's magazine. The introduction to the first collection of poems published under the name Udayaprabha (meaning:morning light) was written by Ulloor. Ulloor observe that her style is very close to that of Kumaran Asan.

On Sree Narayana Guru’s birthday celebrations in 1924, She had prepared and sung a felicitation in verse, written in the Kilippattu style dedicating to the Guru. Hearing the poem, Guru praised her very much.

She has published books in various genres of literature, including poetry, short poems, plays, short stories, translations and biographies. Sreebudha Charitha (biography of Buddha) the incomplete work of the poet Kumaran Asan was completed by Parvati Amma. She has also written one act plays for children.

== Works ==
- Udayaprabha
- Sree Chithira Maha Vijayam
- Maathru Vilapam (meaning:Mother's lament)
- Asrukudeeram or Bakthameerayude Divyasamadi (in Malayalam). SRP Press. 1951.
- Oru Vilapam (meaning:A lament)
- Meera (in Malayalam). VV Press. 1963.
- Gananjali
- Gana Devatha (meaning:Goddess of Songs)
- Pookkari (meaning:Florist) (poetry collections)
- Bhuvanadeepika
- Ahalya
- Save India (play)
- Dharma Bali (play)
- Karmaphalam
- Kathamanjari (stories)
- Sree Narayana Margam (philosophy)
- Randu Devathakal (meaning:Two Goddesses) (Biography)
- Sri Buddha charitam
- Srimad Bhagavad Gita (translation)
- Geethanjali (translation)
- Bharatheeya Vanithakal (meaning:Indian Women) (Translations)
- Muthukulam Parvathy Ammayude Kavithakal. Sahithya Pravarthaka Co-operative Society. 2016. ISBN 978-0000305732.

== Works on her ==
Her biography published in 2005 is written by V. Dethan and published by Fabian Books, Nooranad. In 2016, Kerala Bhasha Institute published Parvathy Amma's biography named Muthukulam Parvathy Amma (ISBN 9788120039582) written by Nirmala Rajagopal.

== Muthukulam Parvathy Amma Award ==
Muthukulam Parvathy Amma Award is a literary award given to woman writers, in the name of Parvati Amma. The award consists of Rs. 10,000 and a Certificate of Merit. Works from any literary genre will be considered for the award. Works that have been published for the first time in the last three years will be considered for the award.

=== Awardees ===
- 2003: Chandramathi
- 2010: C. S. Chandrika, for her essay titled Aarthavamulla Sthreekal.
- 2017: Shahina E. K.
- 2019: Jisha Abhinaya, for Eli Eli Lama Sabaktani a collection of plays.
- 2020: E. K. Sheeba, for the work Manja Nadikalude Sooryan.
- 2021: V. P. Suhra, for her autobiography Jorayude Katha (meaning:'The Story of Jora')
- 2023: V. K. Deepa, for her short story collection Woman Eaters.
- 2024: Sheela Tomy. The award was given for her novel titled Aa nadiyod peru chodikkaruth.
- 2025: Sudha Menon, for her work Charithram adrishyamakkiya murivikal (meaning: Wounds Made Invisible by History).
