= Annagh =

Annagh or Anagh may refer to:

== Places ==
=== Republic of Ireland ===
- Annagh, County Cavan, townland
- Annagh, County Limerick, townland
- Annagh, townland in Kilkenny West civil parish, barony of Kilkenny West, County Westmeath, Republic of Ireland

Note: Nearly 30 other townlands in the Republic of Ireland bear the name Annagh

=== Northern Ireland ===
- Anagh (barony), County Londonderry, Northern Ireland; now called Tirkeeran

== See also ==
- Anagha, an Indian actress
- Anagha Deshpande, an Indian cricketer
- Anagha J. Kolath, an Indian Malayalam-language poet
- Enagh Lough, County Londonderry, Northern Ireland; pair of loughs
