= Keeravani =

21st raga in the Melakarta

- Arohanam: S R₂ G₂ M₁ P D₁ N₃ Ṡ
- Avarohanam: Ṡ N₃ D₁ P M₁ G₂ R₂ S
- Equivalent: Harmonic minor scale

Keeravani (pronounced keeravāṇi) is a rāgam in Carnatic music (musical scale of South Indian classical music). It is the 21st Melakarta rāgam in the 72 melakarta rāgam system of Carnatic music. The 21st melakarta rāgam as per Muthuswami Dikshitar school of music is Kiraṇāval̥i.

This rāgam is a popular scale in western music as well. The Western equivalent is the Harmonic minor scale. It is said to be borrowed into Hindustani music from Carnatic music.

== Structure and Lakshana ==
Keeravani scale with shadjam at C

L. Ramakrishnan: instrumental (Veena) improvisation – Alapana and tAnam – in the rAga kIravANI, recorded at Lars Nesbakken's home studio in Portland, Oregon, on Jan 1, 2004.

It is the 3rd rāgam in the 4th chakra Veda. The mnemonic name is Veda-Go. The mnemonic phrase is sa ri gi ma pa dha nu. Its ārohaṇa-avarohaṇa structure (ascending and descending scale) is as follows (see swaras in Carnatic music for details on below notation and terms):

- ārohaṇa: S R₂ G₂ M₁ P D₁ N₃ Ṡ (Note: Alternate notations: Hindustani: S R G̱ M P Ḏ N Ṡ; Western: C D E♭ F G A♭ B C)
- avarohaṇa: Ṡ N₃ D₁ P M₁ G₂ R₂ S (Note: Alternate notations: Hindustani: Ṡ N Ḏ P M G̱ R S; Western: C B A♭ G F E♭ D C)

The notes used in this scale are chathusruthi rishabha, sadharana gandhara, suddha madhyama, panchama, suddha dhaivatha, kakali nishadha.

As it is a melakarta rāgam, by definition it is a sampoorna rāgam (has all seven notes in ascending and descending scale). It is the shuddha madhyamam equivalent of Simhendramadhyamam, which is the 57th melakarta.

== Janya Rāgams ==
Keeravani has many janya rāgams (derived scales) associated with it. Kalyāna vasantam is a popular janya of Keeravani. See List of janya rāgams for full list of rāgams associated with Keeravani. Other popular janya ragams include Chandrakouns, Sāmapriya and Vasantamanohari.
