= Shahina E. K. =

Indian writer

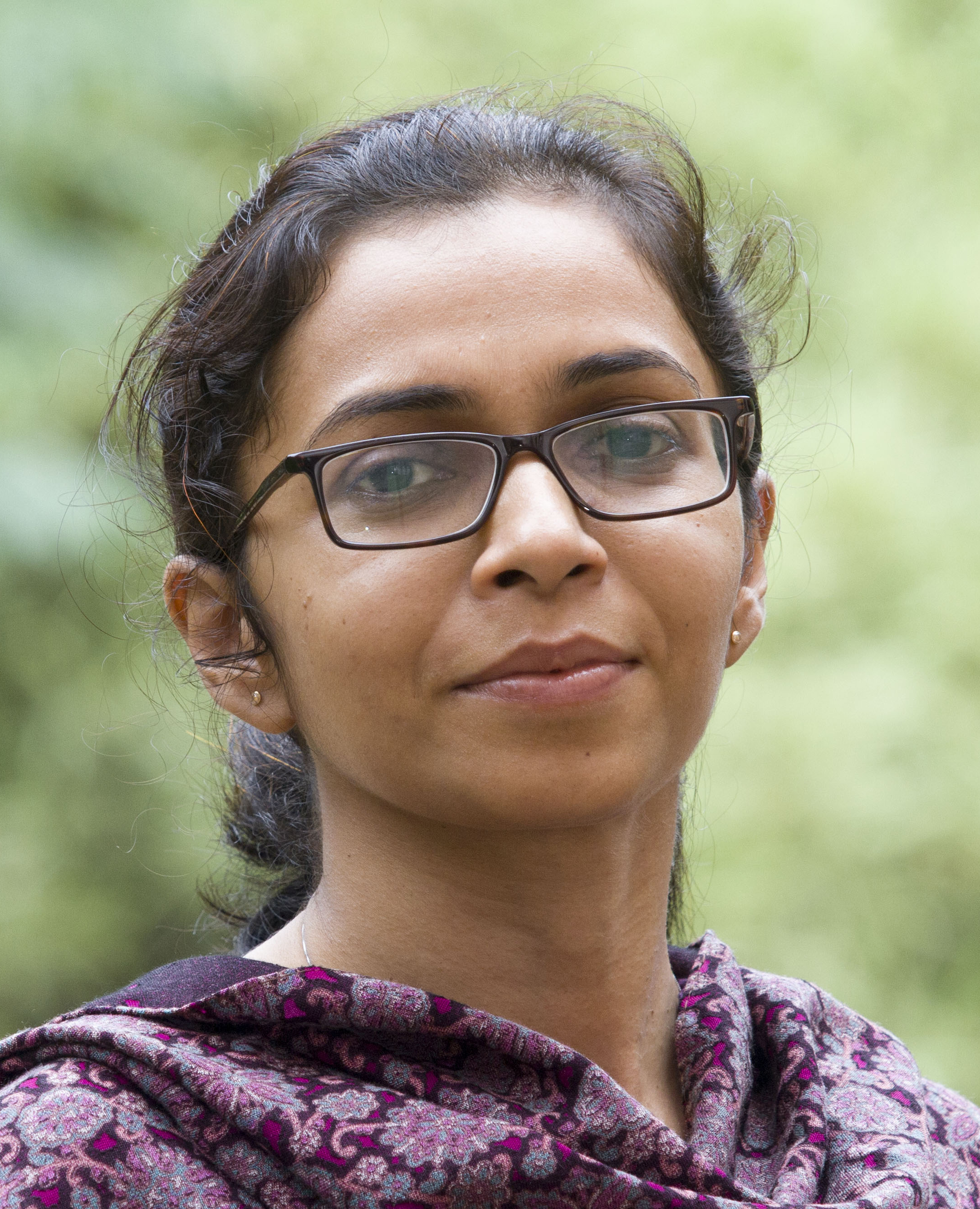
- Born: 29 June 1978 (age 48); Perinthalmanna, Malappuram district, Kerala, India
- Occupations: Writer, teacher
- Writing career
- Genre: Short story
- Notable works: Anandapadmanabhante Marakkuthirakal; Puthumazha Choorulla Chumbanangal
- Notable awards: 2017 Muthukulam Parvathy Amma Award; 2016 T. V. Kochubava Award; 2015 Edasseri Award; 2013 Avneebala Puraskaram; 2011 Kadathanatt Madhaviyamma Kavitha Award; 2007 Gruhalaksmi Award

Shahina E. K. (born 29 June 1978) is an Indian contemporary short story writer from Kerala. She is one of the notable writers in Malayalam literature. She was born in Perinthalmanna, Malappuram district in Kerala. Her stories speak about the common people and the issues related with them. The author’s way of writing is very sharp and powerful.

Translation, novelette, children's literature, poetry etc are her other interested genres and published an anthology of poems, novelette, novel for children etc. Her book, Puthumazha choorulla chumbanangal won Edasseri Award in 2015.

== Bibliography ==
=== Collections of short stories ===
- Phantom Bath
- Anandapadmanabhante marakkuthirakal - (Malayalam:അനന്തപദ്മന്ഭാന്റെ മരക്കുതിരകൾ)
- Puthumazha choorulla chumbanangal - (Malayalam:പുതുമഴ ചൂരുള്ള ചുംബനങ്ങൾ)
- Pranayathinte Theekkadinumappuram
- Neelatheevandi - (Malayalam:നീലത്തീവണ്ടി)
- Unni Express Delheennu Mutthashi veettileykk - (Malayalam:ഉണ്ണി എക്സ്പ്രസ്സ് ഡെൽഹീന്ന് മുത്തശ്ശി വീട്ടിലേക്ക് - children's literature _novel)

=== Translation works ===
- The prophet to (Malayalam:പ്രവാചകൻ)

=== Poems ===
- Ottanjodi kavithakal to (Malayalam: ഒറ്റഞൊടി കവിതകൾ)
