= Kalyanavasantam =

Janya raga of Carnatic music

- Arohanam: S G₂ M₁ D₁ N₃ Ṡ
- Avarohanam: Ṡ N₃ D₁ P M₁ G₂ R₂ S

Kalyanavasantam (also written as kalyanavasantham) is a rāgam in Carnatic music (musical scale of South Indian classical music). It is a janya rāgam (derived scale) from the 21st melakarta scale Keeravani. It is a janya scale, as it does not have all the seven swaras (musical notes) in the ascending scale. It is a combination of the pentatonic scale Chandrakauns of Hindusthani music and the sampurna raga scale Keeravani.

== Structure and Lakshana ==
Ascending scale with shadjam at C, which is same as Chandrakauns scale

Descending scale with shadjam at C, which is same as Keeravani scale

Kalyanavasantam is an asymmetric rāgam that does not contain rishabham or panchamam in the ascending scale. It is an audava-sampurna rāgam (or owdava rāgam, meaning pentatonic ascending scale). Its ārohaṇa-avarohaṇa structure (ascending and descending scale) is as follows:

- ārohaṇa : S G₂ M₁ D₁ N₃ Ṡ (Note: Alternate notations: Hindustani: S G̱ M Ḏ N Ṡ; Western: C E♭ F A♭ B C)
- avarohaṇa : Ṡ N₃ D₁ P M₁ G₂ R₂ S (Note: Alternate notations: Hindustani: Ṡ N Ḏ P M G̱ R S; Western: C B A♭ G F E♭ D C)

The notes used in this scale are shadjam, sadharana gandharam, shuddha madhyamam, shuddha dhaivatham and kakali nishadham in ascending scale, with panchamam and chathusruthi rishabham included in descending scale. For the details of the notations and terms, see swaras in Carnatic music.
