= Emil Madhavi =

Indian playwright and theatre director

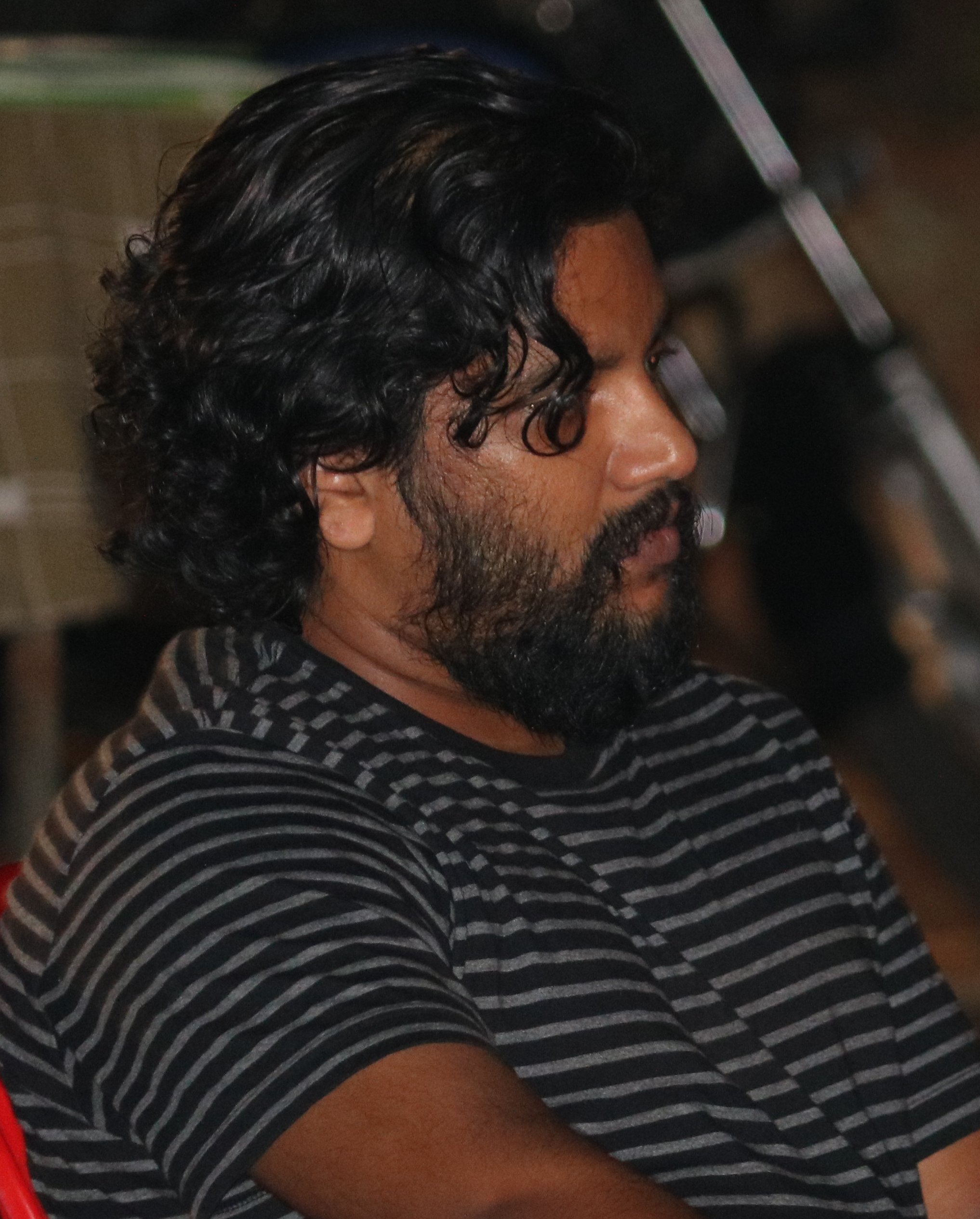
- Emil Madhavi
- Born: Kozhikode, Kerala, India
- Occupations: Playwright, theatre director, acting trainer
- Spouse: Roshni Swapna
- Awards: Kerala Sahitya Akademi Award for Drama (2022)

Emil Madhavi is a writer, theatre actor, playwright, director, and acting trainer from Kerala India. His play collection Kumaru won the 2022 Kerala Sahitya Akademi Award for Drama, 2022 Edasseri Award and the 2022 Abu Dhabi Sakthi Award for drama.

== Biography ==
Emil Madhavi was born in Kozhikode. He graduated in Chemistry from St. Joseph's College, Devagiri, Kozhikode, and graduated with first rank in drama studies from School of Drama and Fine Arts, Thrissur. Later he took post-graduate studies in drama from University of Hyderabad. He also studied yoga from Rishikesh Yoga Vedanta Academy. He is the founder and creative director of 'Theatre Company' in Kozhikode.

He is doing his PhD research on 'Sound Scenography and Contemporary Theatre Performance'.

=== Personal life ===
Emil's life partner is Roshni Swapna, a poet, novelist, painter, and teacher at Thunchath Ezhuthachan Malayalam University, Tirur. They live in Tirur in Malappuram district now.

== Career ==
Emil acted in 40 theatre productions and directed 25 plays. The main plays he directed are Imitation of Death, Divine Comedy, Varinia, Image Book, and A Secret Tile of an Invisible Mirror.

He is currently a Graded Artist in the Drama Department of All India Radio.

Emil is active in research activities in intimate theater and applied theater, which allows to experience the body's movement potential at its highest level. He has authored about twenty research papers related to drama.

Emil who experimented with different modes of theatre production, introduced a novel method of involving a limited audience and making them part of the play. Emil has named this 'The Performance Museum Project'. A Performance Museum is a concept similar to how one experiences an art museum, where the audience can see the characters and also immerse themselves in the play. He also developed an acting training program called Inner Circle Acting Methods and conducts acting training classes in India and abroad.

== Noted works ==
=== Marananukaranam ===
Imitation of Death (Marananukaranam in Malayalam) is a play that only accommodates 15 audience. The audience becomes part of the play. Another unique feature is that a single performance of this play takes place in eighteen different locations. Along with the concept of death, the play focuses on the sounds, smells, the smell of his grandfather, witchcraft, rituals, and other things that he loved since his childhood. Most of the play is performed with the audience blindfolded. It was first staged in Hyderabad, in 2017 Yasir Amin writes in Thejas News that the theater performance "An Imitation of Death" gave him a rare experience in which death itself instilled courage in someone who was afraid to think about death.

=== Kumaru ===
The theme of the play Kumaru is the search for truth carried out by a thief. However, Emil says that it is not just a thief's search but the search of every human being, and that the play does not seek the truth but what is the language of truth.

=== Raghavan Dai ===
Raghavan Dai, written and directed by Emil, is a crime thriller play set in the 1990s. This play was presented by Al Quso Theatre Dubai at the 13th Bharat Murali Drama Festival held in Abu Dhabi in 2025 January.

=== Mayyazhipuzhayute Theerangalil ===
Another notable work of Emil is the drama adaptation of M. Mukundan's famous novel Mayyazhippuzhayude Theerangalil. The play with the same name as the novel was first staged at the Kannur Collectorate Grounds in May 2024 as part of the Deshabhimani M Mukundan Literary Festival. That was the first time the novel is being staged. More than 32 artists perform in this two-hour play, which is performed on a stage that extends into the audience.

=== Varinia ===
Scripted by Civic Chandran, and directed by Emil and his wife Roshni Swapna, Varinia is a play adaptation of the story of Spartacus.

== Books published ==
- Kumaru. Ivory Books. 1 January 2020. ISBN 8194821517. Collection of plays.
- Appakkunjungalude Aakasayathra. Green Books. 1 January 2017. ISBN 9789387331082. Collection of short plays in children's literature.

== Awards and honors ==
Emil Madhavi won the 2022 Kerala Sahitya Akademi Award for best play collection, for Kumaru. This book also received the 2022 Edasseri Award and the 2022 Abu Dhabi Sakthi Award for drama.
