= O. V. Usha =

Indian writer

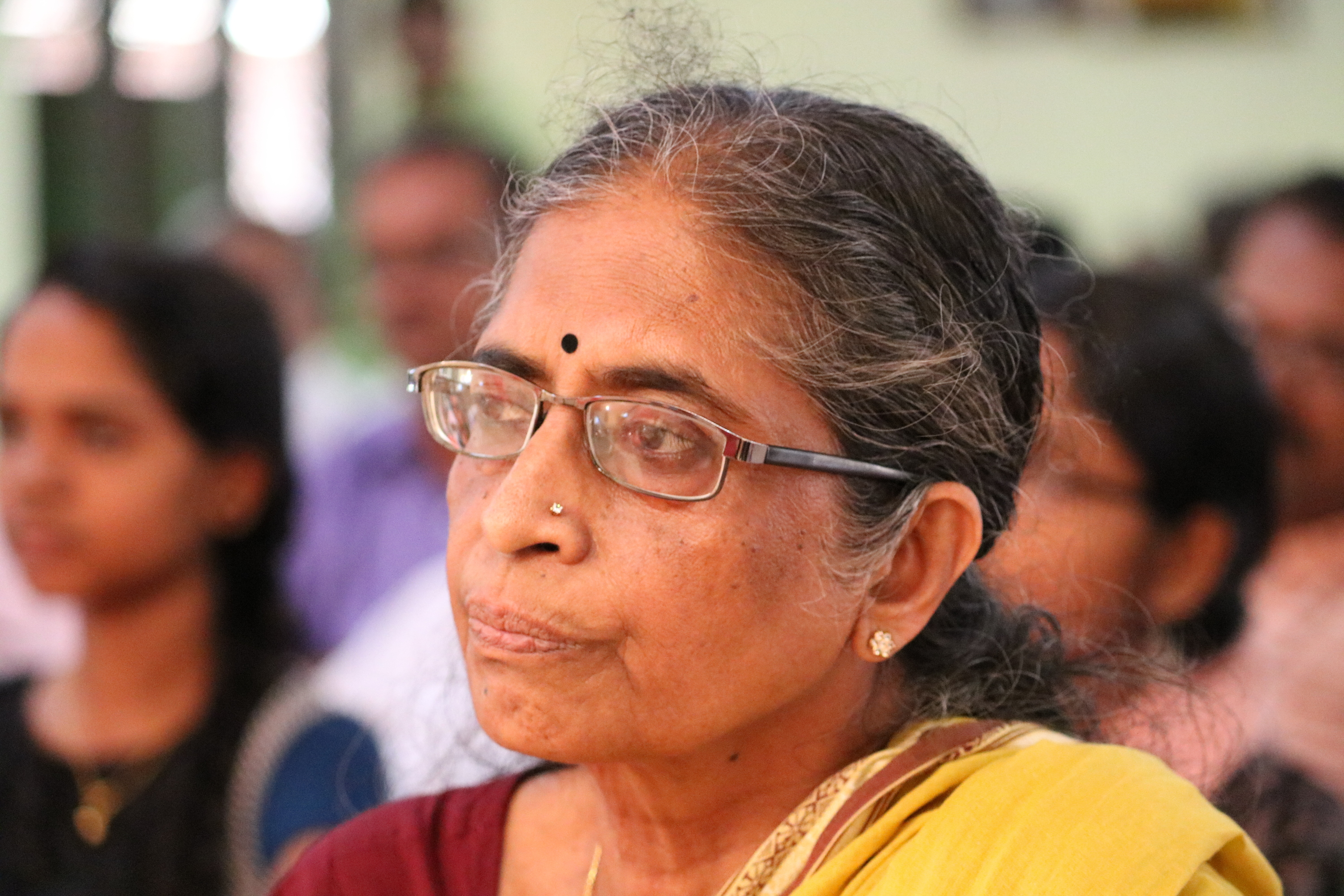
- O. V. Usha in 2016
- Born: 4 November 1948 (age 77)
- Occupations: Poet, novelist
- Relatives: O. V. Vijayan (brother)

Ottupulackal Velukkuty Usha (born 4 November 1948) is a Malayalam poet and novelist. She has written four volumes of poems and a few short stories while also authoring a novel. She has also written articles in various journals. Usha served the Mahatma Gandhi University Kottayam as its director of publications. She won the Kerala State Film Award for Best Lyrics for Mazha, a Malayalam film released in 2000.

== Biography ==
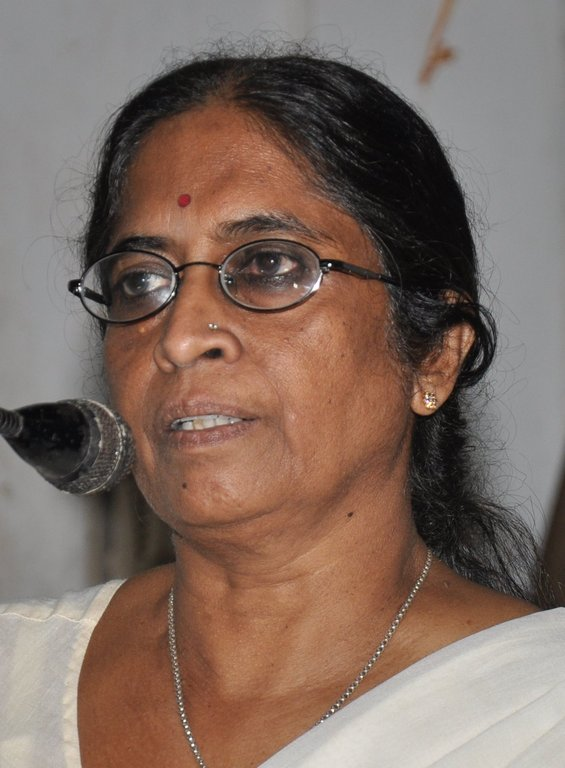

Usha was born in a small village near Palakkad, Kerala as the youngest child of her family. Her childhood was mostly spent in her native village. Her father was employed at "Malabar Special Police" while her eldest brother O. V. Vijayan was a novelist and cartoonist.

Usha was drawn to Malayalam literature by her mother thus developing an interest towards it at an early age. Usha started writing poems at the age of 13, and was a frequent contributor to the "Children's Corner" of the Malayalam weekly Mathrubhumi. Her poems were published regularly in the weekly till 1973 when she was aged 25. After her schooling, she moved to Delhi, as her brother was settled there, and completed a post graduate degree in English literature from the Delhi University.

Upon completing her degree, Usha started her career as an editorial trainee and later became the editor-in-chief of a publishing house. In 1971, one of her short stories titled "Inquilab Zindabad" was made into a film of the same name. In the same film she wrote a song ( 'aarude manasile gaanamayi njan', music G. Devarajan, Singer P.Leela) presumably by first women lyricist in modern Malayalam filmdom.

From 1973, she did not contribute more for a period of ten years. In 1982, she resumed writing and has been a frequent contributor since then. While most of her poems are not published in a "book form", her only novel Shahid Naama was published in 2001.

She was one among the jury members of the Kerala State Film Awards in 2008 and served the Mahatma Gandhi University, Kottayam as its director of publications.

== Works ==
- Snehageethangal (Poetry)
- Dhyaanam (Poetry)
- Agnimitrannoru Kurippu (Poetry)
- Shahid Naama (Novel, 2001)
- Nilam Thodaa Mannu (Short story)

== Awards ==
- 2000 – Kerala State Film Award for Best Lyrics for Mazha

== Notes ==
=== Sources ===
- George, K. M. (1992). Modern Indian Literature, an Anthology: Plays and prose. Sahitya Akademi. ISBN 978-81-7201-324-0.
- Tharu, Susie J.; Lalita, Ke (1993). Women Writing in India: The twentieth century. Feminist Press at CUNY. ISBN 978-1-55861-029-3.
