= Kolachery =

- Census Town
- Location in Kerala, India Kolachery (India)
- Coordinates: 11.9737°N 75.4083°E
- Country: India
- State: Kerala
- District: Kannur
- Taluk: Taliparamba

Government
  - Type: Panchayati raj (India)
  - Body: Kolachery Grama Panchayat

Area
  - Total: 10.89 km^{2} (4.20 sq mi)

Population (2011)
  - Total: 17,095
  - Density: 1,570/km^{2} (4,066/sq mi)

Languages
  - Official: Malayalam, English
- Time zone: UTC+5:30 (IST)
- PIN: 670601
- Nearest city: Kannur

Kolachery is a census town and Grama Panchayat in the Kannur District of Kerala state, India. Kolachery is located 15 kilometres (9.3 mi) northeast of Kannur city.

== Local administration ==
Kolachery Grama Panchayat was formed by merging two villages (viz) Kolachery census town & Cheleri village. It belongs to Edakkad Block and politically part of Taliparamba Assembly constituency under Kannur Loksabha constituency. The panchayat was awarded the best panchayath in the district in 2015.

== Demographics ==
As of 2011 Census, Kolacherry had a population of 17,095 with 7,847 males and 9,248 females. Kolachery census town spreads over an area of 10.89 km^{2} (4.20 sq mi) with 3,307 families residing in it. The sex ratio was 1,178 higher than the state average of 1,084. In Kolachery, the population of children under 6 years was 13.2%. Kolachery had overall literacy of 93% higher than national average of 59% and lower than state average of 94%.

== Religion ==
As of 2011 Indian census, Kolachery census town had a population of 17,095 which constituted 47% Hindus, 52.6% Muslims, and 0.4% others.

== Suburbs ==
Karinkalkuzhi, Kolacherimukku, Kambil, Pampuruthi, Patyam, Chelerimukku, Pallipparamba.

== Transportation ==
The national highway passes through Valapattanam town. Goa and Mumbai can be accessed on the northern side and Cochin and Thiruvananthapuram can be accessed on the southern side. The road to the east of Iritty connects to Mysore and Bangalore. The nearest railway station is Kannur on Mangalore-Palakkad line. Trains are available to almost all parts of India subject to booking over the internet. There are airports at Mattanur, Mangalore, and Calicut. All of them are international airports but direct flights are available only to Middle Eastern countries.

== Notable people ==
- Shyamkrishnan R., short story writer, winner of Yuva Puraskar
