= C. S. Chandrika =

Indian author

C.S. Chandrika
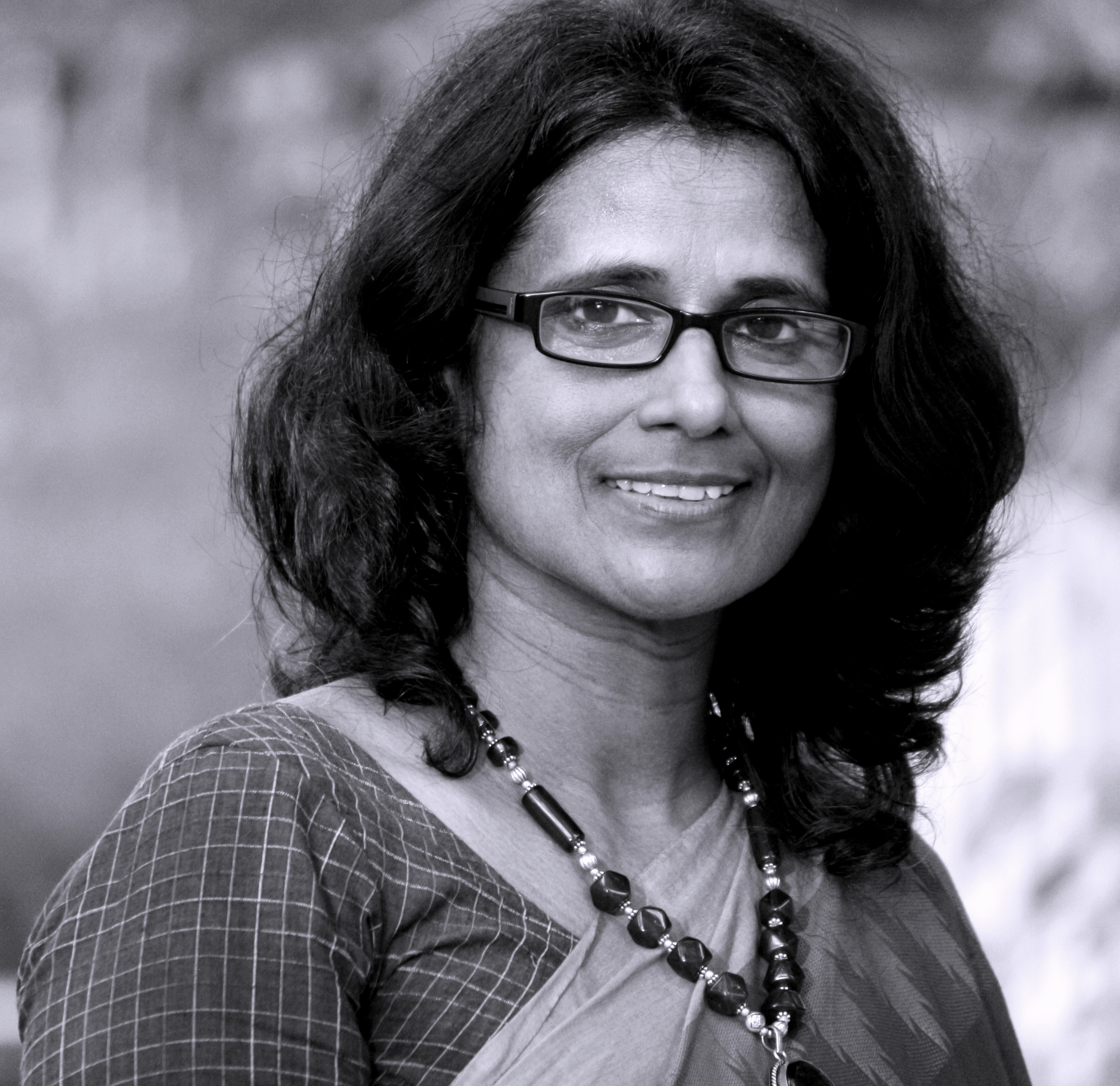
- Chandrika in 2019
- Born: 1967 (age 58–59); Peringottukara, Thrissur
- Education: University of Calicut (Ph.D.)
- Occupation: Writer
- Writing career
- Language: Malayalam
- Notable work: Kleptomania
- Notable awards: Thoppil Ravi Award

C.S. Chandrika is an Indian author in Malayalam from Kerala who writes fiction and non-fiction and is also a social scientist, activist, and columnist involved in women's and human rights and environmental and development concerns.

== Education ==
Chandrika gained a bachelor's degree in botany and a master's degree in Malayalam language and literature and women studies. She has a PhD in Fine Arts from University of Calicut.

== Career ==
Chandrika has taught at the Centre for Women's Studies, Pondicherry, and has also worked widely in the area of gender and development. She is also associated with Sakhi Women's Resource Centre, Kerala.

== Publications ==
Chandrika has published both academic and fictional works. She was one of the editors of The Oxford India Anthology of Malayalam Dalit Writing, which was a collection of Malayalam Dalit writing of the 20th century. She won the Thoppil Ravi Award for her story collection Kleptomania in 2012. The Muthukulam Parvathy Amma Award was bestowed upon her in 2010 for her essay titled "Aarthavamulla Sthreekal". Her interview along with her story was published in Malayalathinte Kathakarikal, which listed her among ten prominent Malayali women writers. Many of her works have been translated into English, Tamil and Kannada languages. They include:

- Pira
- Bhoomiyude Pathaka
- Ladies Compartment
- Ente Pachakkarimve
- Kleptomania
- "Aarthavamulla Sthreekal" (Essay)

She had published a monograph on K. Saraswathi Amma, who was an early 20th century Malayalam feminist writer.
