= Asha G. Menon =

Indian playback singer

Asha G Menon
- Born: 25 October 1985 (age 40); Thrissur
- Occupation: Singer
- Children: 2
- Parents: C.Govindankutty Menon (father); Nandini Nambiath (mother)

Asha G. Menon (born 25 October 1985) is a well-known Malayalam film playback singer, who is widely remembered for her first song 'Aaradyam Parayum' from the film 'Mazha' (2000). At the age of 15, she won the Kerala State Award for the Best Female Playback Singer in 2001. The song Aaradyam Parayum in the film Mazha directed by Lenin Rajendran starring Biju Menon and Samyuktha Varma won the award. She is also popular as a TV presenter who anchored the music show on Asianet - 'Hrudayaragam' for many years. Today she is a music teacher at Indian High School, Oud Metha Campus in Dubai.

== Personal life ==
Asha was born in Thrissur. She was born in 1985. Her father C.Govindankutty Menon (Kuruppath family, Thrissur) died when Asha was 3 years old. Asha started learning music at a very young age, initially from Thrissur Vaidyanada Bhagavathar and later from Shri.Mangad Nadesan. Currently, a music teacher in Dubai, Asha devotes her time teaching music to kids and grownups in and around UAE. She also runs online classes for students located in UK and USA.
