= K. P. Ramanunni =

Indian novelist

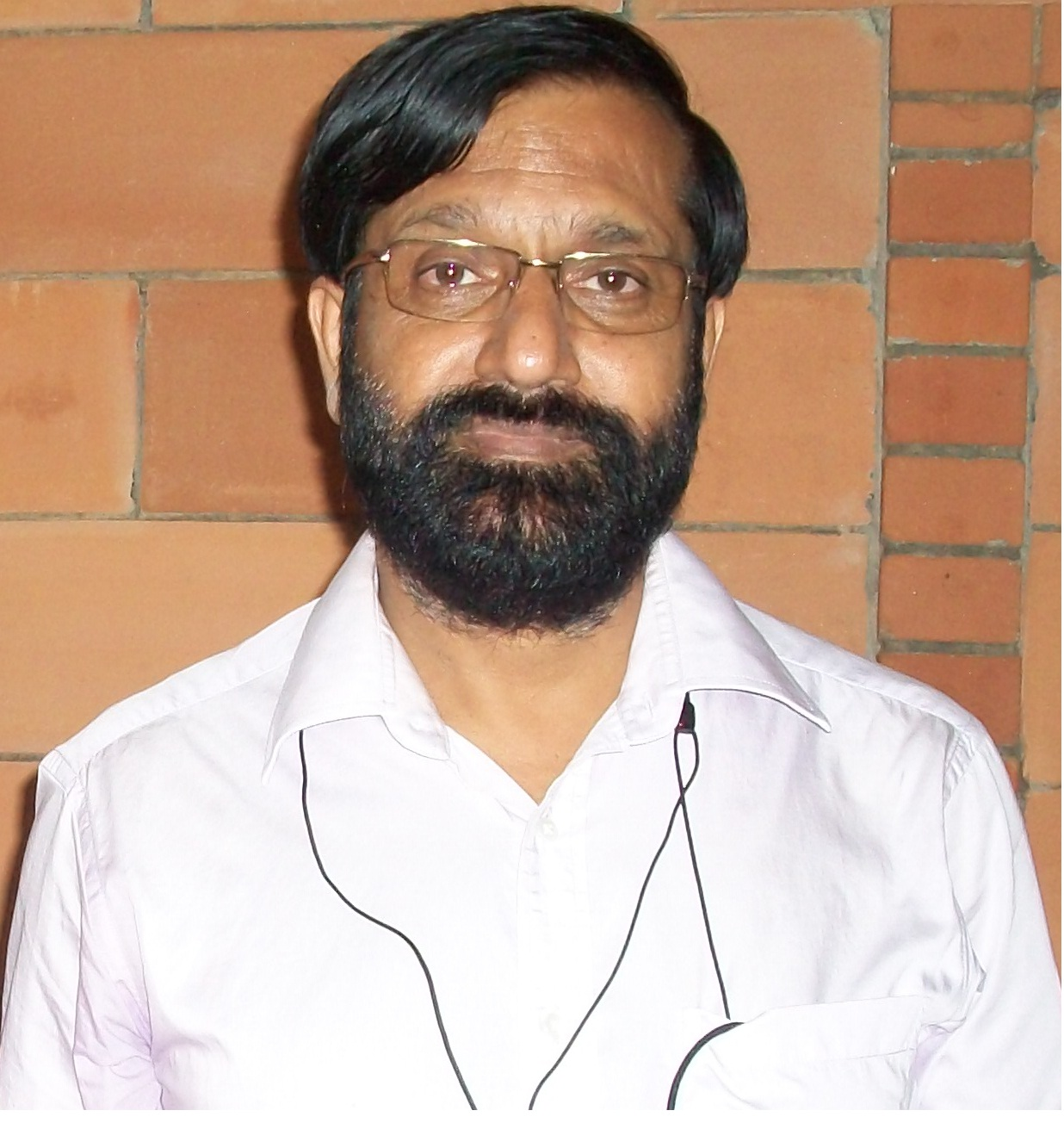
- Born: 1955 (age 70–71); Ponnani, Malabar District, Madras State, India
- Occupations: Writer; Administrator, Thunjan Memorial Trust, Tirur

K. P. Ramanunni is a novelist and short-story writer from Kerala, India. His first novel Sufi Paranja Katha (What the Sufi Said) won the Kerala Sahitya Akademi Award in 1995 and the novel Daivathinte Pusthakam (God's Own Book) won the Kendra Sahitya Akademi Award in 2017. Jeevithathinte Pusthakam (Book of Life) won the 2011 Vayalar Award.

== Life ==
It took nearly fifty years for Ramanunni to produce his next novel, Charama Varshikam (Death Anniversary).Oxford University Press has brought out his second novel Charamavarshikam in English as Death Anniversary. And five years more to write his next novel Jeevithathinte Pusthakam (Book of life). The theme of the novel is woven around the life of a bank officer in the grip of amnesia. It was urban hypocrisy and the rural benevolence that he tried to portray in it. Experiences from his own life had added colour to the story, he says. Critics have hailed Jeevithathinte Pusthakam as a significant contribution to Malayalam literature. 'DaivathintePusthakam' won the National literary award of India in 2017. (Kendra Sahitya Akademi Award.) The novel had also received Sadbhavana Award, Basheer Award Abudhabi Sakthi Award and Asghar Ali Engineer National Award.

Ramanunni's short stories which appeared in various leading Malayalam journals have been published in fifteen collections. His very first short story Shavasamskaram won the Prize for the best Short story from Samastha Kerala SahityaParishad. Another Short Story Mukalakshanam was awarded the V.P. Sivakumar Smaraka Keli Award. The short story JatiChodikkuka won the Padmarajan Puraskaram and Katha award, New Delhi. The short story Manushyan Mrugam Eninganne was awarded Bahrain Keraleya Samajam Prize. His collection of short stories PurushaVilapam won AbudabiSakthi Award and the short story collection Jadhi Chodikukka won Kalakkad Award. His selected short story collection won the C.V. Sreeraman Award of 2009 & T.V. Kochubava Award of 2009.

Ramanunni has participated in many National and International Literary Seminars. As a senior fiction writer in Malayalam he has represented the language in the international Katha Seminar in New Delhi. He has visited America three times on invitation from Federation of Kerala Associations in North America. He has also visited England, Europe, U.A.E, Oman, Bahrain, Qatar, Bangkok, Iraq, Jordhan, Egypt and Singapore on invitation from different Malayalee organizations. K.P. Ramanunni was the member of writers' delegation sent to China by Kendra Sahitya Akademi in 2007. K.P. Ramanunni was the Malayalam advisory board member of Sahitya Akademi, New Delhi. He was also the member of Kerala Sahitya Akademi and curriculum committee. Now he is the governing body member of Malayalam Mission.

Ramanunni is an activist working in the field of communal harmony and Mother tongue movement in Kerala. He led so many campaigns against the communal division of the society. He has addressed the communal problems from the standpoint of a real believer. His initiative in this field has been duly acknowledged throughout India.

== Works ==
=== Novels ===
- Sufi Paranja Katha (What the Sufi Said)
- Charama Varshikam (Death Anniversary)
- Jeevithathinte Pusthakam (Book Of Life)
- Daivathinte Pusthakam (God's Own Book)

=== Short story collections ===
- Vidhathavinte Chiri
- Vendapettavante Kurish
- Purusha Vilapam
- Jathi Chodikkuka
- Selected Short Stories of K.P. Ramanunni
- achyuthammama
- Entrance Ezhuthunnakutty (Balasahityam)
- Priyappetta Kathakal
- Fokso
- Grama Kathakal
- Prakasamparathunna Aankutti
- Aval Mozhiyukayanu
- Tanthappratheyyam
- Pranayaparvam
- Kurks

=== Collection of Essays ===
1. Kriminal Kuttamakunna Rathi 2. Shirshasanam 3. Anubhavam, Orma, Yathra 4. Jeevitham Oru Arthikarante Kayyil 5. Oruviswasiyude Mathethara Chinthakal 6. Manas Malayalam

=== Screenplay ===
- Sufi Paranja Katha

== Awards ==
K. P. Ramanunni has won several awards and recognitions for his contributions towards Malayalam literature:

- Kendra Sahitya Academy Award (2017 for Daivathinte Pusthakam)
- Kerala Sahitya Akademi Award for Novel (1995 for Sufi Paranja Katha)
- Vayalar Award (2011 for Jeevithathinte Pusthakam)
- Edasseri Award (1989 for Sufi Paranja Katha)
- Padmarajan Award (1999 for Jaathi Chodikkuka)
- Vayalar Award (2011 for Jeevithathinte Pusthakam)
- Abu Dhabi Sakthi Award (Story) (for Purushavilapam)
- Abu Dhabi Sakthi Award (Novel) (2015 for Daivathinte Pusthakam)
- V.P. Sivakumar Smaraka Keli Award
- Bharathiya bhasa parishad National Award
- Dr. Asghar Ali Engineer Memorial Lifetime Achievement Award
- Malayatoor Award
- Basheer Award
- Katha Award
- Bahrain Keraleeya Samajam Award
- A. P. Kalakkadu Award
- C. V. Sreeraman Award
- Indian Islamic Centre Abu Dhabi Literary Award 2023
- T.V. Kochubava Award
