= B. Sandhya =

Retired Indian police officer from Kerala

B. Sandhya IPS
- Born: 25 May 1963 (age 63); Palai, Kottayam, Kerala
- Occupation: Police officer
- Years active: 1988 – 2023
- Spouse: Madhu Kumar
- Children: 1
- Parents: S. Bharathadas; Karthyayani Amma

B. Sandhya (born May 25, 1963) is a retired officer of the Indian Police Service and a former Director General of the Kerala Fire and Rescue Services, Home Guard, and Civil Defence. She is also known for her literary contributions which have won her a number of awards including the Edasseri Award in 2007. She retired from the service with the rank of Director General of Police on May 31, 2023.

== Early life ==
Sandhya was born on 25 May 1963 to Bharathadas and Karthyayani Amma at Palai in the Kottayam district of Kerala.

Sandhya is married to K. Madhukumar, the former Controller of Examinations, University of Kerala. The couple has a daughter, Hyma.

== Education ==
Sandhya studied at St. Antony's Girls' High School in Alappuzha and at Sacred Heart Girls' High School, Bharananganam. She then completed her M.Sc. in Zoology from Alphonsa College, Palai.

She was trained in Human Resources Management at Wollongong University, Australia, and passed the PGDBA course from Pondicherry University. She then earned her Ph.D. from the Birla Institute of Technology and Science, Pilani. Her dissertation was entitled "The Accessibility of Women to the Criminal Justice System and Customer Orientation of Police Personnel Towards Women."

== Career ==
Sandhya started her career as Project Officer at Matsyafed (Kerala State Co-operative Fisheries Federation) from where she joined the Indian Police Service, after passing the Indian Civil Services Examination in 1988. She served as Assistant Superintendent of Police, Shornur, Joint Superintendent of Police, Alathur, Superintendent of Police, CBCID, Kannur, District Superintendent of Police, Kollam and Thrissur, Asst. Inspector General of Police, Headquarters, Thiruvananthapuram, Deputy Inspector General of Police, Crime Investigation, Southern Range, Thiruvananthapuram. Inspector General of Police Central Zone, Ernakulam. From 2013 Sandhya holds the post of Additional Director General of Police.

== Police Service ==
Insignia	Designation	Unit Name
	Director-General	Kerala Fire and Rescue Services (January, 2021-May, 2023 )
	ADGP(Training) & Director, KEPA	Kerala Police Academy (2018-2020)
	ADGP	South Zone (2016-2017)
	ADGP	Modernisation (2015)
	ADGP	Armed Police Battalions (2013-2015)
	IG	CBCID EOW CSO (2012)
	IG	Thrissur Range (2011)
	IG	Ernakulam Range(2010)
	IG	Traffic (2009)
	IG	Apbn. & Traffic (2007-2009)
	DIG	Thrissur Range (2005-2006)
	DIG	CBCID (2001-2005)
	AIG	PHQ (1999-2001)
	SP	Kollam (1994-1995) & (1998-1999)
	Training in Australia	University of Wollongong (3 months)
	SP	Thrissur (1996-1998)
	SP	Kollam (1995 & 1998-1999)
	SP	CBCID (1993-1994)
	AAIG	PHQ (One month)
	ASP & JSP	Alathur (1992-1993)
	ASP	Shornur (1991-1992)

== Significant contributions ==
- Convener of the Kerala Police Act (2011) drafting committee.
- Founding Nodal Officer for the highly successful Community Policing Project of Kerala (Janamaithri Suraksha Project).
- As Law and Order IG and ADGP, introduced Women Helpline, Pink Patrol and many innovative programmes and maintained Law & Order in an outstanding fashion through professional policing and public trust.
- Investigated a number of high profile crimes including murders, crimes against women and terrorism successfully.
- As first Traffic Inspector General of Kerala introduced a number of innovative projects.
- Managing Editor of the ISSN registered Journal of Kerala Police viz; Janamaithri: A Journal of Democratic Policing.
- While leading Armed Police Battalions, instrumental in formation of the Commando Wing of Kerala Police and the KATS.
- Trained the first Women Battalion of Kerala, including Women Commandos.
- Organized Global Conclave on Community Policing and several seminars/ conferences for the Kerala Police, including the first Police Science Congress, Kerala Police Academy.
- Worked as Special Officer of the Government of Kerala for the Tribal Areas of Northern Districts.
- Introduced the system of ‘Certified Trainers’ in Kerala Police. Blended training methodologies are also introduced. Almost all the Police personnel of Kerala (52,876) were given training in 2018 and almost all personnel are given Cyber Training during 2019. System of webinar and online tutorials are introduced to train personnel. Police – academia collaborations have been established with several Universities and a large number of Police personnel (rank agnostic) have passed out on subjects relevant to current day Policing. Research Wing is established at Kerala Police Academy which undertakes several researches to promote evidence based policing. The Research Wing has brought out a book on Floods 2018.
- Published a number of scholarly articles on Criminal Justice and Policing (https://scholar.google.com/citations?user=v8NnFD4AAAAJ&hl=en)

== Awards ==
- Best Police District Award of the Chief Minister of Kerala in the year 1997 for Thrissur District, while working as Superintendent of Police, Thrissur.
- Awarded President of India’s Police Medal for Meritorious Service on the occasion of Republic Day 2006.
- International Association of Women Police – Annual Award 2010. Awarded at Minneapolis, U.S., for the outstanding contribution in the field of Community Policing and Crimes Against Women.
- Awarded President of India's Police Medal for Distinguished Service on the occasion of Republic Day 2014.
- Received the Guinness Book of Award for Janamaithri Police of Kerala State for participating in an environmental programme organized by Asianet News Network, Thiruvananthapuram, on World Forest Day on 21 April 2017.
- Received the Police Excellence Award 2017 for Janamaithri Suraksha Project, Community Policing Scheme of Kerala from the Foundation for Police Research, New Delhi.
- Received the Guinness Book of Award for participating in the largest physical self defense lesson consisting of 2886 participants at Nishagandhi Auditorium, Kanakakkunnu Palace, Thiruvananthapuram, Kerala India on 28 July 2017.
- Received the Badge of Honour from the Director General of Police, Kerala on 26 January 2018 for successful investigation and prosecution of criminals in a sensational Murder cum rape case of a Dalit woman (Crime No.909/16 of Kuruppumpady, Ernakulam Rural)
- Received Kerala State e-Governance Award (2016–17) from the Government of Kerala for being a member of the Project Team which instituted the 'Kerala Police Academy e-Learning System (KeLS)’, which won the first prize under the category of e-Learning.
- Received a certificate of appreciation from DGP & State Police Chief, Kerala for successfully conducting National Workshop on “New Trends in Police Training Methodologies” on 29 May 2018 at KEPA, Thrissur.
- Received a certificate of appreciation from DGP & State Police Chief, Kerala for successfully conducting National Workshop on “Knowledge Management Strategies for the Police” on 27 June 2018 at Police Training College, Thiruvananthapuram.
- Received a certificate of appreciation from DGP & State Police Chief, Kerala dated 3 April 2019 for training all the officials of Kerala Police Department during 2018, the ‘Year of training and learning’.
- Received a certificate of appreciation from DGP & State Police Chief, Kerala for successfully conducting National Workshop on “Predictive Policing and Cyber Techniques for Policing” on 6 & 7 February 2019 at Police Training College, Thiruvananthapuram

== Investigating officer ==
In 2006, Sandhya was involved in the investigation into allegations of sexual assault made against former Kerala Public Works minister P. J. Joseph. In 2009, Sandhya implemented The Janamaithri Suraksha Project (the Community Policing Project of Kerala), a successful model of Community Policing. She has also served as a member of the Micro Mission 02 project of the Bureau of Police Research & Development and in 2016, she led the investigation team in the Jisha murder case.

== Awards and honours ==
In 2010, the International Association of Women Police (IAWP), based in the US, awarded Sandhya the International Scholarship of Distinction. In 2006, the Kerala Police awarded Sandhya the President's Police Medal for Meritorious Service. Her novel Neelakoduveliyude Kavalkkari won the Edasseri Award in 2007, and the work Attakkilikunnile Athbhudangal won the Abu Dhabi Sakthi Award in 2012 in children's literature category. She also received the Gopalakrishnan Kolazhi Award-2001, Kunjunni Puraskaram-2013, E.V Krishnapillai Sahithya Puraskaram-2019, and Punaloor Balan Puraskaram-2019.

== Literary and creative work ==
Sandhya has published many books of literature and several research papers in police science. In addition, Sandhya edited Impressions, a Short History of Kerala Police, published by the Director General of Police, Kerala, Thiruvananthapuram. She also conceptualised a website, Kerala Police History

=== Literary publications (Malayalam) ===
Children's Literature

- Tharatthu (The Lullabies) – 1999, Saindhava Books
- Balavadi (The Nursery) – 2001, State Institute of Children's Literature. Won the Kolazhi Gopalakrishna Panikker memorial children's literature award.
- Kattarente Koottukari (Forest river my friend) – 2007, Poorna Publications
- Ethra Nalla Ammu (Ammu, how nice she is), Won Kunjunni Puraskaram 2013
- Attakkilikunnile Athbhudangal (The Wonders in the Sparrow Hill) – 2009, Novel, SPCS, Kottayam. Won Abu Dhabi Sakthi Award – 2012

Collection of poems

- Ranthal Vilakku (The lantern) – 2002, current Books, Kottayam
- Neermaruthile Uppan (Greater coucal on the tree of Neermaruth) – 2004, Saindhava Books, Kollam
- Chempakam Nee Madangippokalle (Oh ! Chempa tree, Do not Return) -2013, SPCS, Kottayam
- Selected Poems of B.Sandhya – 2013, DC Books
- Sakthi Seetha - 2020, Mathrubhumi Books

Novels

- Neelakkoduvelitude Kavalkkari (The Protectress of Neelakkoduveli) – 2006, Mathrubhumi Books
- Ithihasathinte Ithalukal (Petals of the Epic) – 2015, Mathrubhumi Books.

Articles

- Oru Punchiri Mattullavarkkayi,(Collection of articles)-2021, Sign Books.
- Mahapralayam,(കേരളം നേരിട്ട പ്രളയദുരന്തത്തിൽ സമാനതകളില്ലാത്തവിധം രക്ഷാപ്രവർത്തനം നടത്തിയ കേരളപോലീസിന്റെ ഇടപെടലുകളെക്കുറിച്ചുള്ള പഠനം)-2022, Mathrubhumi Books
