= Ulloor Award =

Malayalam literary award

Ulloor S. Parameswara Iyer was one of the modern triumvirate poets of Malayalam poetry. There are two major annual literary awards instituted in his memory, both known by the name Ulloor Award.

The older among the two awards was instituted by Mahakavi Ulloor Memorial Library and Research Institute and presented at Ulloor Memorial in Jagathy, Trivandrum, in Kerala, coinciding with the birth anniversary of the poet. The award is given in two categories: Ulloor Literary Award is given to poetry collections published in the last three years as first edition in Malayalam–language and Ulloor Endowment Award is given for the best critical work on the poet. The literary award carries a ₹10,000 cash prize and a citation, and the endowment carries ₹5,000 cash and a citation.

The other award was instituted in 2017 by Ulloor Service Cooperative Bank.

== Recipients of Ulloor Award instituted by Ulloor Memorial Library and Research Institute ==
=== Award for poetry ===
Year	Recipient	Work	Ref.
2003	M. P. Appan	—	
2009	Ettumanoor Somadasan	Jalasamadhi	
2014	Neelamperoor Madhusoodanan Nair	Avan Njan Thanne Aakunnu	
2017	N. K. Desam	Mudra	
2018	Sudarsan Karthikaparambil	Kumarasambhavam	
2022	V. P. Joy (Joy Vazhayil)	Kaanaamara	

=== Endowment Award ===
Year	Recipient	Work	Ref.
2009	Sr. Ancy S. H.	Ulloorum Prabhodhanathmakangalum	
2014	K. F. Susheela	Moolyasankalpam Ulloor Kavithayil	
2018	Dr. S. Harikrishnan	Ulloorinte Unmayum Ullolikalum	
2022	Dr. C. Unnikrishnan	Mahakavi Ulloor: Parswavatkarikkapetta Vyaktitvam	

== Recipients of award instituted by Ulloor Service Cooperative Bank ==
Year	Recipient	Work	Ref.
2017	Prabha Varma	Aparigraham	
2018	Ravivarma Thampuran	Poojyam	
2019	—	—	—
2020	E. P. Sreekumar	Adhwanavetta	
2021	Sunil P. Ilayidom	Mahabharatham : Samskarika Charithram	
2022	Azeem Thannimoodu	Marathine Thirichu Vilikunna Vithu	
2025	T P Venugopalan	Thunnalkkaran	
