= Edasseri Award =

Indian literary award for literary works in Malayalam language

- Award for individual contributions to Malayalam literature
- Awarded for: Literary award in India
- Sponsored by: Edasseri Smaraka Samithi, Ponnani
- First award: 1982
- Final award: 2021

Highlights
- First winner: N. K. Desam
- Website: www.edasseri.org

Edasseri Award is an Indian annual literary award given to outstanding literary works produced in Malayalam language. The award was instituted in 1982 by Edasseri Smaraka Samithi in memory of Malayalam poet Edasseri Govindan Nair. Each year a separate branch of literature, like poetry, novel, short story, etc., is considered for the award. A short-list is prepared after a preliminary scrutiny of the manuscripts and/or printed books received for consideration, and a three-member jury chooses the recipient of the award out of the short-listed selection.

== Recipients ==
| Year | Recipient | Work | Ref. |
|---|---|---|---|
| 1982 | N. K. Desam | Ullekham | |
| 1983 | S. Ramesan Nair | Soorya Hridayam | |
| 1984 | S. V. Venugopan Nair | Rekhayillatha Oral | |
| 1985 | Nellikkal Muraleedharan | Purappad | |
| 1986 | Ashitha | Vismaya Chhihnangal | |
| 1987 | Nalini Bekal | Moochilottamma | |
| 1988 | N. P. Hafis Muhamed | Poovum Puzhayum | |
| 1989 | K. P. Ramanunni | Sufi Paranja Katha | |
| 1990 | Paul Kallanode | Aalparppillatha Veedu | |
| 1991 | A. V. Sreekanta Poduval | Venuganam | |
| 1992 | Karimpuzha Ramachandran | Sloka Kacheri | |
| 1993 | Sreedharanunni | Vazhi | |
| 1994 | Joy Mathew | Madhyadharanyazhi | |
| 1995 | Ashokan Charuvil | Oru Ratrikku Oru Pakal | |
| 1996 | M. Krishnan Namboodiri | Akshara Soundaryam | |
| 1997 | P. Udaya Bhanu | Atanja Vathil | |
| 1998 | K. Raghunath | Samadhanathinnu Vendiyulla Yudhangal | |
| 1999 | Sathish K. Sathish | Rose Mary Parayanirunnathu | |
| 2000 | Ambikasuthan Mangad | Commercial Break | |
| 2001 | Prameela Devi | Vatakaveettile Sandhya | |
| 2002 | C. Ashraf | Chila Visudha Janmangalude Viseshangal | |
| 2003 | M. Kamaruddin | Puthiya Niyamam | |
| 2004 | Haridas Karivallur | Jeevitham Thudakkan Oru Thoovala | |
| 2005 | Divakaran Vishnumangalam | Jeevante Button | |
| 2006 | Budhanoor Raghunath | Kuthirakkarante Makan | |
| 2007 | B. Sandhya | Neelakoduveliyude Kavalkkari | |
| 2008 | Susmesh Chandroth | Swarnamahal | |
| 2010 | P. M. Govindanunni | Amaratharakam | |
| 2011 | P. Vijayakumar | Mahayathra | |
| 2012 | Raphael Thaikattil | Munnootti Ambathi Nalilekku Neengunna Yatrakal | |
| 2013 | M. R. Raghava Varier | Malayalakavitha:AdhunikathayumParambaryvum | |
| 2014 | Unnikrishnan Cheruthuruthy | Dehali | |
| 2015 | N. Rajan | Moonnu Mudivettukar | |
| 2015 | Shahina E. K. | Puthumazha choorulla chumbanangal | |
| 2015 | T. P. Venugopalan | Kunnumpuram Karnival | |
| 2016 | Valsalan Vathusseri | Malayala Sahitya Niroopanam | |
| 2016 | A. N. Krishnan | Atarukal, Atayalangal Arthasamvadam | |
| 2016 | Mini Prasad | Penkathakalude Feminist Vayana | |
| 2016 | S. Girishkumar | Gandhamadanagirinirakalil | |
| 2017 | Riyaz | Aadupuliyattam | |
| 2017 | Padman Narath | Vishadakandam | |
| 2017 | Jisha Abhinaya | Eli Eli Lama Sabakthani | |
| 2017 | A. Santhakumar | Nasar, Ninte Perenthanu? | |
| 2018 | Prabha Varma | Aparigraham | |
| 2018 | Lopa | Vaikkolppava | |
| 2018 | Kanimol | Nilathezhuthu | |
| 2018 | Aryambika S. V. | Kattilodunna Theevandi | |
| 2019 | Unni R. | Vaank | |
| 2019 | G. R. Indugopan | Kollappatti Daya | |
| 2019 | V. R. Sudheesh | Penkathakalude Feminist Vayana | |
| 2019 | E. Sandhya | Anantharam Charulatha | |
| 2020 | Dr. P. Soman | Vyloppilli Kavitha Oru Idathupaksha Vayana | |
| 2020 | Dr. N. Ajayakumar | Vakkile Nerangal | |
| 2020 | Dr. S. S. Sreekumar | Kavithayude Vidvamsakatha | |
| 2020 | Dr. E. M. Suraja | Kavithayile Kaalavum Kaalpadukalum | |
| 2021 | K. V. Sarathchandran | Vithakkunnavante Upama | |
| 2021 | Rajmohan Neeleswaram | Jeevitham Thunnumpol | |
| 2021 | Emil Madhavi | Kumaru | |
