= Kerala State Film Award for Best Lyricist =

Annual Indian film award

- State award for contributions to Malayalam cinema
- Sponsored by: Kerala State Chalachitra Academy
- First award: 1969
- Final award: 2024
- Most recent winner: Vedan

Highlights
- Total awarded: 53
- First winner: Vayalar Ramavarma
- Website: www.keralafilm.com

The Kerala State Film Award for Best Lyricist is presented annually at the Kerala State Film Awards of India to a lyricist for best lyrics in a Malayalam film. Until 1997, the awards were managed directly by the Department of Information and Public Relations of the Government of Kerala. Since 1998, the awards have been organized by the Kerala State Chalachitra Academy, an autonomous, non-profit institution functioning under the Department of Cultural Affairs (Kerala). The awardees are decided by an independent jury constituted every year by the government. Their names are announced by the Minister for Cultural Affairs and the awards are presented by the Chief Minister.The first Kerala State film Awards ceremony was held in 1970 with Vayalar Ramavarma receiving the award for Nadhi and Kadalpalam (1969). O. N. V. Kurup is the most honoured lyricist with 14 awards, followed by Gireesh Puthenchery with seven.

== Most awards ==
Lyricist	Image	Wins	Years
O.N.V Kurup		14	1973, 1976, 1977, 1979, 1980, 1983, 1984, 1986, 1987, 1988, 1989, 1990, 2008, 2016
Gireesh Puthenchery		7	1995, 1997, 1999, 2001, 2002, 2003, 2004
Rafeeq Ahammed		6	2007, 2009, 2010, 2012, 2015, 2022
Vayalar Ramavarma		4	1969, 1972, 1974, 1975

== The Kerala State Film Award for Best Lyricist winners ==
Year	Lyricist	Image	Film(s)	Song(s)
1969	Vayalar Ramavarma		Nadhi, Kadalpalam	
1970	P. Bhaskaran		Sthree	
1971	Sreekumaran Thampi		Vilakku Vangiya Veena	
1972	Vayalar Ramavarma		Chembarathi	
1973	O. N. V. Kurup		Swapnam	
1974	Vayalar Ramavarma		Nellu, Athithi	
1975	Vayalar Ramavarma		Chuvanna Sandhyakal, Swami Ayyappan	
1976	O. N. V. Kurup		Survey Kallu	
1977	O. N. V. Kurup		Madanolsavam	
1978	Kavalam Narayana Panicker		Vadakakku Oru Hridayam	
1979	O. N. V. Kurup		Ulkkadal	
1980	O. N. V. Kurup		Yagam, Ammayum Makalum	
1981	Bichu Thirumala		Thrishna, Thenum Vayampum	
1982	Kavalam Narayana Panicker		Marmaram	
1983	O. N. V. Kurup		Adaminte Vaariyellu, Parasparam	
1984	O. N. V. Kurup		Aksharangal, Ithiripoove Chuvannapoove	
1985	P. Bhaskaran		Kochu Themmadi	
1986	O. N. V. Kurup		Nakhakshathangal	
1987	O. N. V. Kurup		Manivathoorile Aayiram Sivarathrikal	
1988	O. N. V. Kurup		Vaishali	
1989	O. N. V. Kurup		Oru Sayahnathinte Swapnam, Purappadu	
1990	O. N. V. Kurup		Radhaamadhavam	
1991	Bichu Thirumala		Kadinjool Kalyanam	
1992	P. Bhaskaran		Venkalam	
1993 †	Yusuf Ali Kechery		Ghazal	
1993 †	Kaithapram		Paithrukam	
1994	Yusuf Ali Kechery		Parinayam	
1995	Gireesh Puthenchery		Agnidevan	Oru Poovithalin
1996	Kaithapram		Azhakiya Ravanan	Vennilachandanakkinam
1997	Gireesh Puthenchery		Krishnagudiyil Oru Pranayakalathu	Pinneyum Pinneyum
1998	Yusuf Ali Kechery		Sneham	
1999	Gireesh Puthenchery		Punaradhivasam	Kanakamunthirikal
2000	O. V. Usha		Mazha	Aaradyam Parayum
2001	Gireesh Puthenchery		Raavanaprabhu	Aakasha Deepagal Sakshi
2002	Gireesh Puthenchery		Nandanam	Karmukil Varnante Chundil
2003	Gireesh Puthenchery		Gaurisankaram	Urangathe Ravurangi Njan
2004	Gireesh Puthenchery		Kathavasheshan	Kannunattu Kathirunnittum
2005	Ponnkunnam Damodaran		Nottam	Pachapanam Thathe
2006	Prabha Varma		Out of Syllabus	Poyi Varuvan Koode Varu
2007	Rafeeq Ahammed		Pranayakalam	Etho Vidooramam
2008	O. N. V. Kurup		Gulmohar	Oru Naal Subharathri
2009	Rafeeq Ahammed		Sufi Paranja Katha	Thekkini Kolaya Chumaril
2010	Rafeeq Ahammed		Sadgamaya	Oru Pooviniyum VIdarum
2011	Sreekumaran Thampi		Naayika	Nanayum Nin Mizhiyoram
2012	Rafeeq Ahammed		Spirit	Mazha Kondu Mathram
2013	Prabha Varma		Nadan	Ethu Sundara Swapna Yavanika
2013	Dr. Madhu Vasudev		Nadan	Ottakku Paadunna
2014	O. S. Unnikrishnan		La Sa Gu	Ithra Pakalinodothu Chernnittumee
2015	Rafeeq Ahammed		Ennu Ninte Moideen	Kathirunnu Kathirunnu
2016	O. N. V. Kurup		Kambhoji	Nadavathil Thurannila
2017	Prabha Varma		Clint	Olathil Melathal
2018	B.K.Harinarayanan		Joseph; Theevandi	Kannethadooram; Jeevamshamayi
2019	Sujesh Hari		Sathyam Paranja Viswasikkuvo	"Pularippoo Pole Chirichum"
2020	Anwar Ali	.jpg	Bhoomiyile Manohara Swakaryam; Maalik	"Smaranakal Kadalay" "Theerame Theerame"
2021	B.K.Harinarayanan		Kaadakalam	"Kanniru Kadanja"
2022	Rafeeq Ahammed		Viddikalude Mash	"Thiramaalayaanu Nee"
2023	Hareesh Mohanan		Chaaver	"Chenthamara Poovil"
2024	Vedan		Manjummel Boys	"Viyyarppu Thunniyitta Kuppayam"
