= E. P. Sreekumar =

Indian short story writer and novelist

E. P. Sreekumar is an Indian short story writer and novelist in Malayalam. He received the Kerala Sahitya Akademi Award for Story in 2010 for his collection Parasya Sareeram. He is also a recipient of Abu Dhabi Sakthi Award, C. V. Sreeraman Award and Ulloor Award.

== Biography ==
Sreekumar was born in Pallipuram near Cherai in Ernakulam district, Kerala. He worked for 35 years at the People's Urban Cooperative Bank in Tripunithura and retired as its General Manager in 2014. He published a science fiction novel titled Maramudra in 2002 which a prize in a competition held as part of the golden jubilee of Current Books. His other works include the short story collections Parasya Sareeram, Currency and Adhwanavetta, and the novels Mamsapporu and Dravyam.

== Awards ==
Sreekumar is a recipient of several awards including:

- Kerala Sahitya Akademi Award for Story in 2011 for Parasya Sareeram
- Abu Dhabi Sakthi Award in 2015 for Currency
- K. R. Manoraj Award in 2015 for Currency
- C. V. Sreeraman Award in 2018 for Adhwanavetta
- Ulloor Award in 2019 for Adhwanavetta
- Current Books Golden Jubilee Novel Award for Maramudra
- T. V. Kochubava Award
- S. K. Pottekkatt Award
- SBT Literary Award

== Works ==
=== Short story collections ===
- Parasya Sareeram (DC Books, 2008)
- Currency (Mathrubhumi Books, 2014)
- Kanneerppasu (Logos Books, 2017)
- Adhwanavetta (DC Books, 2017)
- Khalasi (DC Books, 2022)

=== Novels ===
- Maramudra (Current Books, 2002)
- Mamsapporu (DC Books, 2013)
- Dravyam (DC Books, 2021)
