= N. K. Desam =

Indian poet and literary critic (1936–2024)

- എൻ. കെ. ദേശം
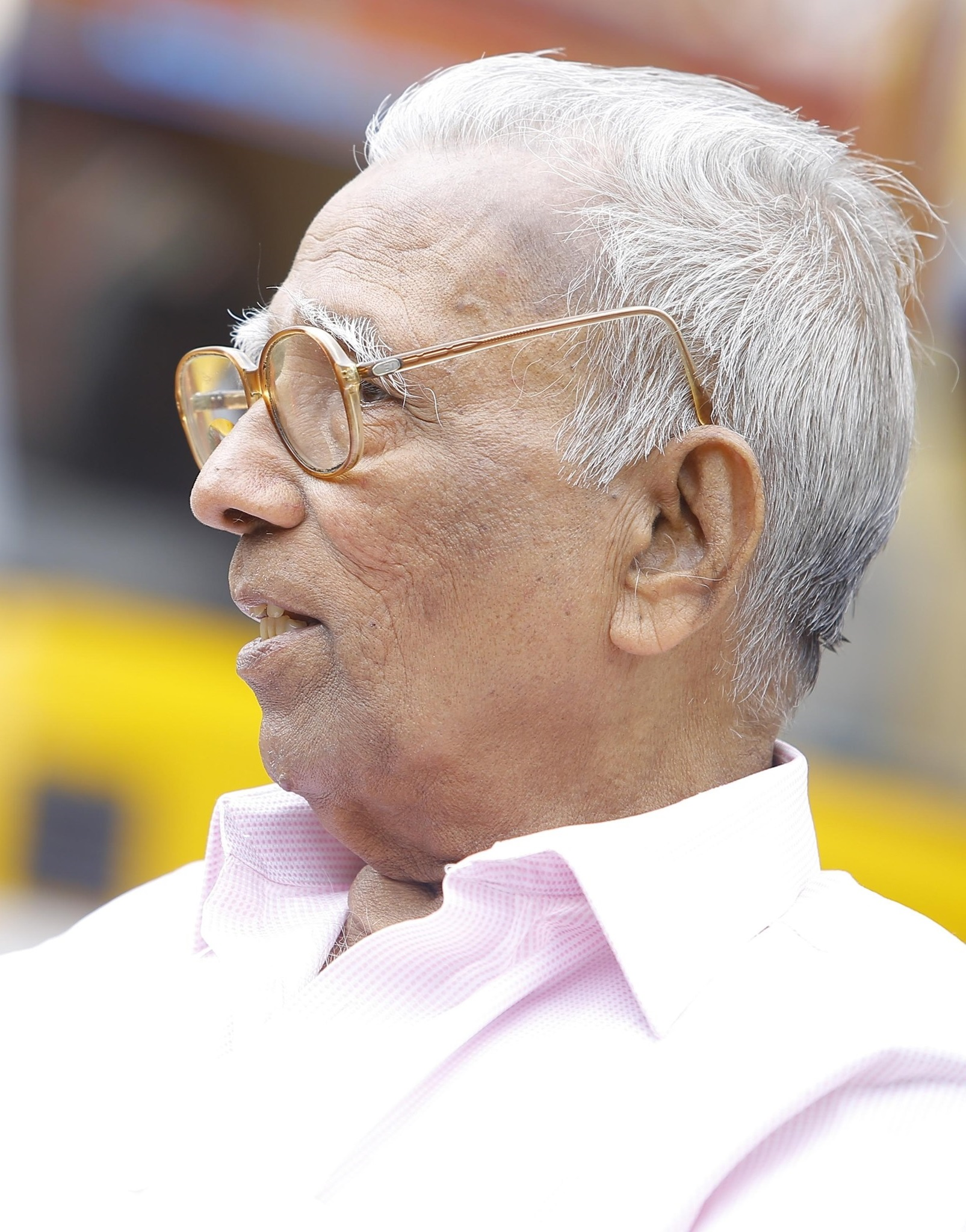
- Desam in 2021
- Born: N. Kuttikrishna Pillai; 31 October 1936; Desom, Alwaye, Cochin, India
- Died: 4 February 2024 (aged 87); Kothakulangara, Angamaly, Kerala, India
- Occupations: Poet, literary critic, Translator
- Spouse: R. Leelavathi
- Writing career
- Language: Malayalam
- Notable works: Mudra, Gitanjali
- Notable awards: Kerala Sahitya Akademi Award, Odakkuzhal Award, Sahitya Akademi Translation Prize

N. Kuttikrishna Pillai (31 October 1936 – 4 February 2024), better known as N. K. Desam, was an Indian Malayalam-language poet and literary critic from the southern state of Kerala. In 2009, his poetry collection Mudra won the Kerala Sahitya Akademi Award. In 2017, his Malayalam transliteration of Gitanjali by Rabindranath Tagore was selected for the Kendra Sahitya Akademi Translation Prize.

== Biography ==
N. K. Desam was born on 31 October 1936 in Desom village near Alwaye. He was an officer at the Life Insurance Corporation and retired in 1996. He was married to R. Leelavathi and had three children. He started writing from the early age of twelve and went on to publish more than 10 poetry collections. His first collection 'Anthimalari' was published in 1973. In 2016, he received the Kendra Sahitya Akademi award for the translation of Rabindranath Tagore’s ‘Gitanjali’ in Malayalam language.

N. K. Desam died on 4 February 2024, at a hospital in Kodungallur. He was 87. His body was cremated the next day. Hundreds of people gathered at his cremation site along with local Policemen to pay their last tribute.

== Works ==
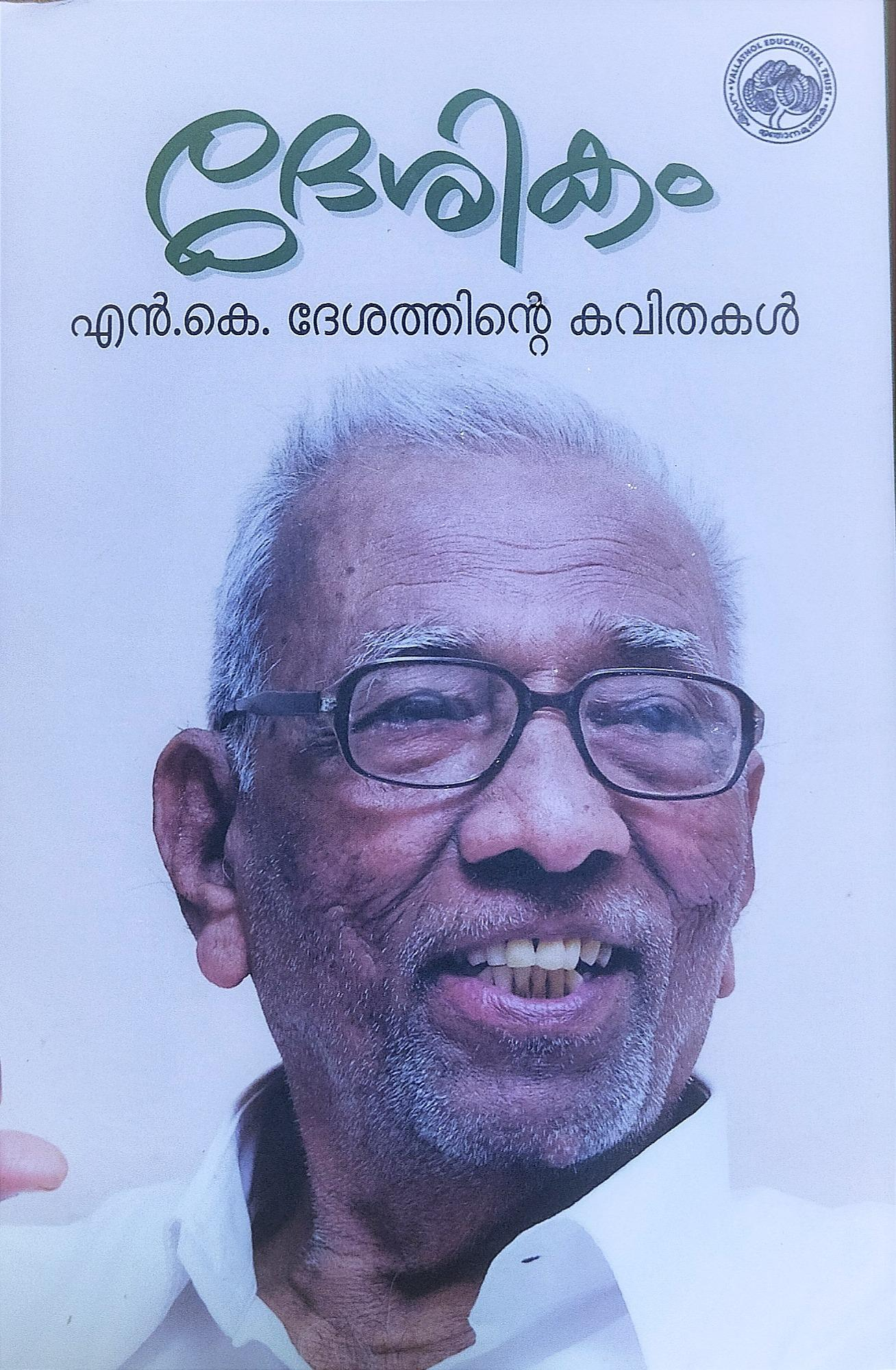
Complete works

Year	Title	Publisher	Notes
1973	Anthimalari	S.P.C.S., Kottayam	
1975	Kanyahridayam	S.P.C.S., Kottayam	
1979	Appooppanthadi	Kerala Sahitya Akademi, Trichur	
1979	Chottayile Seelam	S.P.C.S., Kottayam	
1981	Pavizhamalli	S.P.C.S., Kottayam	
1984	Ullekham	N.B.S., Kottayam	
1999	Anpathonnaksharalee	S. T. Reddiar & Sons, Cochin	
2001	Elimeesa	S.P.C.S., Kottayam	
2003	Kavyakeli	Green Books, Trichur	
2006	Mudra	Current Books, Kottayam	
2006	Mazhathullikal	Kurukshethra Publications, Cochin	
2010	Geethanjali	Green Books, Trichur	Translation of Gitanjali
2016	Vyloppilli Kathakavithakal	Green Books, Trichur	
2016	Desikam	Vallathol Vidyapeedam, Sukapuram; N.B.S., Kottayam	Complete works

== Awards ==
- 1982: Edasseri Award (Ponnani) – Ullekham
- 1987: Kavanakuthukam Award (Trichur) – Anthyapranamam
- 1984: Nattarangu (Trivandrum) – Total contribution
- 1992: Bodhi (Aluva) – Total contribution
- 2007: Sahodaran Ayyappan Award (Cherai) – Mudra
- 2007: Odakkuzhal Award (Cochin) – Mudra
- 2008: Nalappadan Award (Punnayurkkulam) – Mudra
- 2008: Vennikulam (Thodiyur) – Mudra
- 2009: Kerala Sahitya Akademi Award (Trichur) – Mudra
- 2009: Katharagam (Bangalore) – Mudra
- 2010: Changampuzha Award (Cochin) – Mudra
- 2011: Cherukad Award (Perithalmanna) – Mudra
- 2013: Asan Prize (Chennai) – Total contribution
- 2013: Krishnankutty Memorial Award (Trichur) – Contribution to Aksharaslokam
- 2013: Mukthakam (Trichur)
- 2013: Kavikulapathi (Pambakuda)
- 2017: Paanini Puraskaaram (Mavelikkara)
- 2013: Kaliyath Damodaran Award (Trichur) – Gitanjali
- 2017: Mukthakasree (Chengamanad) – Total contribution
- 2017: Chethala Vaishnavam (Shoranur) – Total contribution
- 2016: Sahitya Akademi Translation Prize (Chandigarh) – Gitanjali (Translation)
- 2018: Ulloor Award (Trivandrum) – Mudra
- 2019: Ettumanoor Somadasan Award (Ettumanoor) – Various works
- 2020: Sanjayan Award
