= Mobin Mohan =

Indian Malayalam language novelist

- മോബിൻ മോഹൻ
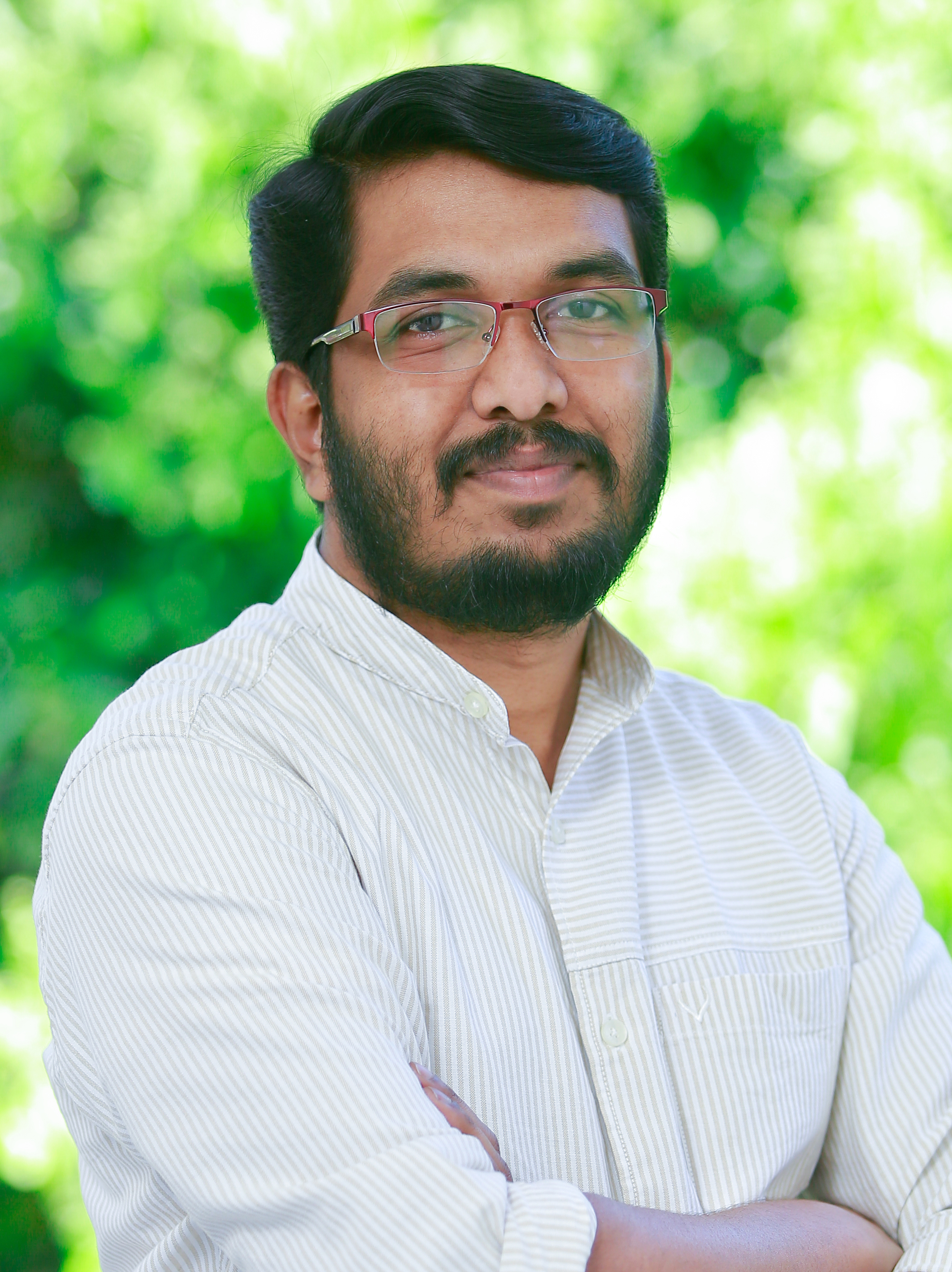
- Mobin Mohan
- Born: 1988 (age 37–38)
- Spouse: Rosmin
- Children: One
- Writing career
- Language: Malayalam
- Notable works: Jakkarandha; Purampokku; AKasham petta Thumbikal
- Notable awards: Kendra Sahithya Akademi YuvaPuraskar (2021); BookCafe Akbar Kakkattil Novel Award

Mobin Mohan is an Indian novelist who writes in the Malayalam language. He is a recipient of the Kendra Sahitya Akademi Yuva award of 2021. He was born in 1988 at Kanchiyar, Idukki district. His grandfather migrated to Idukki from Kottayam in 1944. He was born as the son of NG Mohanan and Sobhana. He completed his education from St Mary's School Kanchiyar, St Mary's school Marykulam, St Jerome's HSS Vellamkudy, college of applied science Kattappana. He was a lecturer of St Sebastian's college, Kattappana. He worked as the District Project coordinator of Kerala cultural department.He is a general council member of Kerala Sahithya Akademi member. He is currently working at Munsiff's court Kattappana.

== Works ==
- Aakaasam petta thumpikal (Story Collection)
- Purambokku (Story Collection )
- Jacaranda (Novel)

== Awards ==
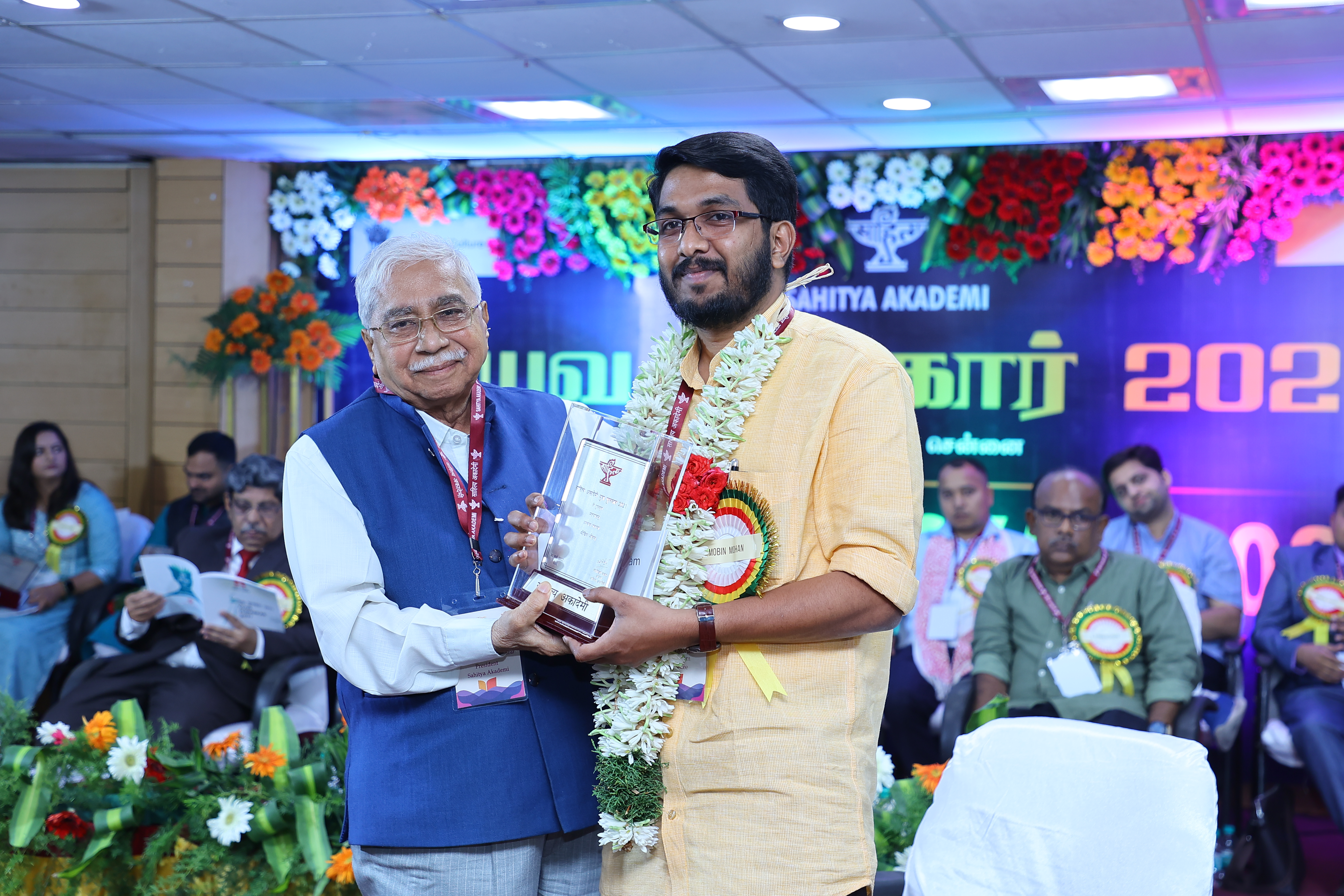
Receiving Yuva Pursaskar 2021 from Kendra Sahitya Akademi President Chandrashekhara Kambara

- Kendra sahitya Akademi Yuva Award 2021 for Jacaranda (novel)
- Book cafe - Akbar Kakkattil award
- Nalanda Puraskaram
- Kolumban Kadha Puraskaram
