= Chandrakauns =

Hindustani Classical Music

- Type: Audava
- Time of day: Late night, 12–3
- Arohana: S G M D N Ṡ
- Avarohana: Ṡ N D M G S
- Synonym: Chandrakosh
- Similar: Malkauns; Hindolam

Chandrakauns is a raga in Hindustani classical music. It is also used in tail pieces and lighter presentations of Carnatic music. In Carnatic music, it is considered a Janya of Melakarta 21 Keeravani
