= Soorya Gopi =

Indian writer

Dr Soorya Gopi
- സൂര്യ ഗോപി
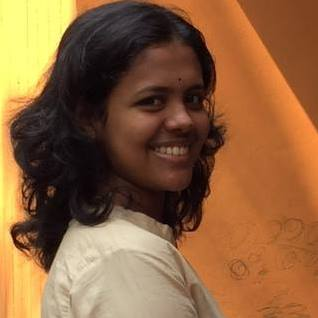
- Born: 26 August 1987 (age 39); Kollam, Kerala, India
- Education: Zamorin's Guruvayurappan College; Mahatma Gandhi University
- Occupations: Litterateur short story writer, sociologist
- Spouse: P.K. Sujith (m. 2012)
- Children: 1
- Writing career
- Notable awards: Kendra Sahitya Akademi Yuva Award

Soorya Gopi is an Indian litterateur, short story writer, and sociologist. Soorya is the recipient of Kendra Sahitya Akademi Yuva Award 2016. She was born on 26 August 1987 at Kollam, Kerala, India to poet P. K. Gopi and Komalam.

== Early life and education ==
She was educated at the Presentation High School and Basel Evangelical Mission Higher Secondary School, both of which are in Kozhikode. She has a bachelor's degree in Sociology and Malayalam and a master's degree in Sociology from Zamorin's Guruvayurappan College, ranking first in University of Calicut in both cases. She has acquired a doctoral degree in Sociology from Mahatma Gandhi University, Kottayam.

== Career ==
Soorya Gopi had worked as a Sociology lecturer in various institutions in Kerala. WWK reviews her story as :The story “Chirakulla Changalakal” (“Chains with Wings”) is included here. The content of this story are the thoughts in loneliness of a girl who was sold. The author presents very beautifully in simple and effortless style, how a girl who was sold by her own parents as a housemaid sits in a sort of solitary confinement and views the outerworld with a wounded heart writing in intense pain and sorrow. The story ends where the girl escapes from the man who bought her and disappears in the crowded city. The symbols and metaphors that flash through the story and noteworthy. At the very outset of the story, there is an indication of a dead, rotten and stinking donkey and this is followed by the story of a few lives imprisoned in an inevitable tragedy. Dr. Soorya has been contributing to her area of interests like gender, media and literature for the past two decades, through academic endeavors.

== Bibliography ==
- Pookkale Snehicha Penkutti (2006)
- Uppumazhayile Pachilakal (2012)
- Pranayamathryum (2016)
- Kaamuki Kaduva (2020)
- Marutha (2025)

== Awards ==
- Kendra Sahitya Akademi Yuva Award
- Ankanam E. P. Sushama endowment award for best short story (2013)
- Madhyamam-Velicham award best short story (2009)
- Ankanam - Geetha Hiranyan Best Short Story award (2008)
- Muttathu Varkey Kalaalaya Sahitya award for best short story (2008)
- State Bank of India-SBT award for the book Pookkale Snehicha Penkutti (2006)
- Malayala Manorama best short story award (2006)
- Poorna Uroob award for best short story (2005)

== Personal life ==
Soorya married P.K. Sujith in 2012. They have a daughter named Chilanka.
