= Shyamkrishnan R. =

Indian Malayalam language writer

- Born: Kolachery, Kannur district, Kerala
- Education: All India Institute of Medical Sciences, Bhubaneswar; Kozhikode Medical College
- Occupation: Short story writer
- Spouse: Kavya P. G.
- Writing career
- Notable work: Meeshakallan
- Notable awards: Yuva Puraskar

Shyamkrishnan R. is a Malayalam language short story writer from Kerala, India. His short story collection Meeshakallan won many awards including the Yuva Puraskar (2024) by Sahitya Akademi.

== Biography ==
Shyamkrishnan was born in a small town named Kolachery in Kannur district of Kerala state, India. His father A.P. Rameshan was a former school headmaster, and his mother O.C. Prasanna is working as AEO of Kannur North. He studied at St. Michael's School in Kannur.

=== Personal life ===
Shyamkrishnan met his wife Kavya P. G., who is also a poet, at a literature camp in Thrissur in 2015. In 2022, they got married.

== Literary career ==
He used to write short poems during his school days, but focussed seriously on writing, mainly short stories, when he was studying for MBBS in Kozhikode Medical College. In 2015, when he was in his final year of MBBS, he received the KV Anoop Memorial Award for his story named Madakkam.

The book Meeshakallan consists of eight short stories written from 2019 to 2022 and published in various periodicals.

== Pr‌ofessional career ==
After completing his MBBS from Kozhikode Medical College, Shyam Krishnan did his MD in Biochemistry from AIIMS, Bhubaneswar. Currently he is assistant professor of biochemistry at Malabar Medical College, Kozhikode.

== Awards ==
His short story collection Meeshakallan won many awards including the Yuva Puraskar (2024) by Sahitya Akademi. Other stories in the collection have won other regional awards also. Meeshakallan also won CV Sriraman Smriti Puraskaram instituted by the CV Sriraman Trust, for young writers in Malayalam, and the KV Anup short story award given as part of the carnival of poetry held at Pattambi Government Sanskrit College.
