= E. K. Sheeba =

Sheeba E.K
- Born: May 20, 1975 (age 51); Perinthalmanna, Malappuram District
- Occupations: Novelist, short story writer
- Writing career
- Pen name: Sheeba
- Genres: Novel, short story
- Notable works: Duniya, Neelalohitham

Sheeba E.K (Malayalam:ഇ.കെ ഷീബ; born 20 May 1975 to E K SOOPI and K. AYISHA) is an Indian author who writes in Malayalam. She was born in Perinthalmanna, Malappuram district in Kerala state. Sheeba was educated at GHS Perinthalmanna, PTM Government College Perinthalmanna and M.E.S. KALLADI COLLEGE Mannarkkad. She took her master's degree in commerce from MES Kalladi College Mannarkkad.She is working as Senior Clerk in Department of General Education Kerala since 2001.Based upon her story, named The Survival, a short film for children has been produced by Perinthalmanna Municipality. .

== Awards ==
- Dala T V kochubava Award
- AVANEEBALA AWARD
- ANKANAM E P SUSHAMA ENDOWMENT

== Bibliography ==
=== Novels ===
- Duniya
- manja nadikalude sooryan

=== Short Novels ===
- Rithumarmarangal

=== Collections of short stories ===
- Y2K
- Neelalohitham
- kanalezhuth

https://web.archive.org/web/20170129102520/http://www.dcbooks.com/kanalezhuth-book-review-by-dr-jissa-jose.html

=== Translation works ===
- Typhoon
- Saraswathi park
- The Novice
- Beyond The Veil

=== Memory ===
- Azhichu kalayanavathe aa chilankakal
