= Aryambika S. V. =

Indian Malayalam language poet

- Born: 1981 (age 44–45); Edanadu, Pala, Kottayam district, Kerala, India
- Education: Sree Sankaracharya University of Sanskrit
- Occupations: Poet, Assistant Professor
- Spouse: Sreedas
- Children: 2
- Parent(s): K. N. Viswanathan Nair; M. K. Savithriamma
- Writing career
- Genre: Poetry
- Notable awards: Yuva Puraskar; Kanakasree Award

Aryambika S. V. (born 1981) is a Malayalam language poet from Kerala, India. She received several awards including Yuva Puraskar by Sahithya Akademi and Kanakasree Award by Kerala Sahitya Akademi.

== Biography ==
Aryambika was born on 1981 at Edanadu, Pala, Kottayam district, Kerala to K. N. Viswanathan Nair and M. K. Savithriamma. Her mother Savitriamma was a Sanskrit teacher. Her father Viswanathan Nair, who was a teacher and exponet in Aksharaslokam, discovered her ability to write and encouraged her to write poetry. After completing primary education from Edanad Govt. L. P. School and Edanad Shakthivilasam N.S.S. High School, she done her graduation from Sree Sankaracharya University of Sanskrit (Thiruvananthapuram Regional Center & Kalady). Aryambika worked as a teacher at Poovarani Govt LP School near Pala. She currently works as Assistant Professor of Sanskrit at Sanskrit department, Mahathma Gandhi College, Thiruvananthapuram.

=== Personal life ===
Aryambika and her husband Sreedas, a native of Panangad and an IT auditor have one son.

== Literary career ==
Aryambika has excelled in Aksharaslokam and poetry since childhood. She also writes songs, and also wrote the lyrics for the musical documentary Amma Abhayam directed by Babu Gopalakrishnan. The opening song for the 2016 Kerala School Kalolsavam was written by Aryambika. She had also wrote the song for the Kerala government's Sutharya Keralam program. She is also active in a shloka organization named Pala Kairaleeshlokarangam.

== Works ==
- Rathriyude Niramulla Janala (in Malayalam). Kottayam: DC books. 2021. ISBN 9789354329807. Poetry collection.
- Thonniyapoloru Puzha (in Malayalam). Kottayam: DC books. 2010. ISBN 9788126428595. Poetry collection.
- Kattilodunna Theevandi (in Malayalam). Kottayam: D. C. Books. 2017. ISBN 9788126476442. Poetry collection.
- Mannamkattayum Kariyilayum (in Malayalam). Pala: Kairalishlokarangam. 2006. Poetry collection.
- Ankanam Kavithakal (in Malayalam). Thrissur: Ankanam Books. 2007. Anthology

== Awards and honors ==
- Yuva Puraskar 2015 by Sahithya Akademi
- Kanakasree Award 2012 by Kerala Sahitya Akademi
- Edasseri Award for Poetry 2018
- Second place in Kavyakeli (poetry) in Kerala School Kalolsavam held in Kottayam in 1996
