= Sufi Paranja Katha =

Malayalam Novel

- Author: K. P. Ramanunni
- Translator: N. Gopalakrishnan
- Illustrator: Artist Namboothiri
- Cover artist: N. Ajayan
- Language: Malayalam
- Publisher: DC Books
- Publication date: November 1993
- Publication place: India
- Pages: 126
- Awards: Kerala Sahitya Akademi Award; Edasseri Award
- ISBN: 978-8-171-30604-6

Sufi Paranja Katha (Sūphi parañña katha; സൂഫി പറഞ്ഞ കഥ) (meaning, The Story as Told by the Sufi) is the debut novel of Malayalam novelist K. P. Ramanunni. It was originally serialised in Kalakaumudi in 1989 and published as a book in 1993. The novel has been translated into eight languages, including English (titled What the Sufi Said) and French. Priyanandanan adapted the novel into a film of the same name in 2010. K. P. Ramanunni himself wrote the dialogue and script of the film.

== Background ==
Ramanunni deals with a complex theme in this novel. A theme that was influenced by his childhood in Ponnani. "I lost my father when I was three and was attached to my mother. We were close to our neighbours who were Muslims. My friend Abdul Khayoom's father was fond of me. Eventually, I realised that the inner core of religion is spirituality," says Ramanunni.

The background of the novel is that of northern Kerala a few decades after the British established their authority. The Nair society that existed there was matrilineal. A child belonged to its mother's family. In the story, a character called Muthassi is the oldest living member of the family. The family consists of her children, grandchildren and great-grandchildren. In this set-up, known as a Tharavad, the oldest man is the administrator or the Karanavar. Sanku Menon is the Karanavar of the Melepullarath Tharavad. He is the grandson of Muthassi. Muthassi's daughter is Sanku Menon's mother. Sanku Menon's sister Ammalu is the mother of Karthy, the principal character. The children did not inherit the property of their father. The inheritance was through the women of the family. In certain parts of Kerala, Muslims also give special importance to the wife's house. Sufi Paranja Katha develops the theme from this complex background.

== Plot summary ==
The story revolves around the love and marriage between Mamootty, a Muslim and Karthy, a Nair Hindu. Though converted to Islam, Karthy is unable to resist the primeval tug of her original religion. We see pantheistic pagan traditions asserting themselves over members of all communities-as Mother Goddess for Hindus, as the Beevi and Jarum for the Muslims. The novel speaks about religious feelings and relationships and the mystic reach of these aspects.

== Publication history ==
Sufi Paranja Katha was serialised in Kalakaumudi weekly in 1989 with the accompaniment of illustrations by the Artist Namboothiri. It was published as a book in November 1993. First DC Books edition came in December 1995.

== Awards ==
- 1995: Kerala Sahitya Akademi Award for Novel
- 1989: Edasseri Award

== Translations ==
Sufi Paranja Katha has been translated into English, French, Hindi, Kannada, Tamil, Konkani, Telugu and Bengali. The English translation by N. Gopalakrishnan titled What the Sufi Said, was published by Rupa & Co. in February 2002. The French translation, made on Gopalakrishnan's English version and titled Tharavad : Ce que disait le soufi, was published by Pondichery-based publishing house Kailash Éditions in 2008. L. R. Swamy translated the novel into Telugu under the title Sufi Cheppina Katha (సూఫీ చెప్పిన కథ) which was published by Saranga Books in August 2012. The Bengali translation was brought out with the support of Bengali writer Krishnendu and a Kerala-based writer Sunil Njaliyathu. The book was released in October 2014 in connection with a book fair in Frankfurt by Christian Weiss, director of the publication house- Draupadi Verlag, which brings out Indian books in German language.

== Film adaptation ==
The 2010 film adaptation of the novel was released with Sharbani Mukherjee as Karthy, Thampi Antony as Sanku Menon and Prakash Bare as Mammootty, directed by Priyanandanan. K. P. Ramanunni himself wrote the screenplay and dialogues for the film. The film won various awards, including four Kerala State Film Awards.

Ramanunni says he had no intention of making the novel into a film. But producer, Kalam Karasseri, had wanted to do a film based on it for years and Ramanunni complied. Ramanunni says he has not deviated much from the novel and wrote the script with a lot of care as it dealt with a sensitive theme. "In order to enhance cinematic effects, only one small portion of the story has been done away with and the anti-colonial sentiments have been highlighted. The dialogues of the film celebrate the co-existence of different religions," says Ramanunni.
