= Lopamudra R. =

Indian poet and translator

Lopa R.
- Lopaa
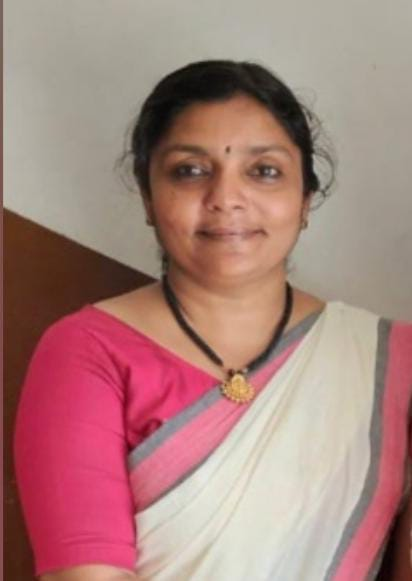
- Born: 26 April 1978; Haripad, Kerala, India
- Education: Bishop Moore College, Mavelikkara
- Occupations: Writer; Translator
- Spouse: Manoj Neelakandan
- Children: 1
- Writing career
- Pen name: Lopamudra
- Notable works: Parasparam, Vykkol Pava
- Notable awards: Kendra Sahitya Akademi Yuva Award, 2012

Lopa R. is an Indian poet and translator writing in Malayalam language with the pen name Lopamudra.

== Early life and education ==
Born in Ayaparampu, Cheruthana Panchayat in Haripad, Alleppey in 1978, she is the daughter of N. Muraleedharan and Renuka. She inherited the literary affinity from her grandfather R. K. Kottarathil, who was a Harikatha artist, scholar and teacher. She lost her father at the age of two.

She completed her master's degree in English language and literature.

== Career ==
After completing her education, Lopa focussed more on her literary works. She has written many poems in Malayalam and translated many from English.

Her works include Parasparam, Vykkolppaava, which have won literary awards. She began writing poems during her college days and became well known among literary circles at the age of 22 when she got first prize for Vishuppathipp poetry competition conducted by Mathrubhumi weekly in April 2000. She has been writing for in Malayalam periodicals since early 2000s and has translated many English poets into Malayalam.

Currently she serves as a member of the English faculty at Alagappa Nagar Government Higher Secondary School in Thrissur.

== Awards and honours ==
- Kunchu Pilla Award in 2001
- V. T. Kumaran Award in 2002
- Geetha Hiranyan Memorial Ankanam Award
- Muthukulam Parvathy Amma Award
- Malayattoor Award
- O V Vijayan Award 2017
- Edasseri Award 2018
- Kendra Sahitya Akademi Yuva Award 2012

== Notable works ==
- 2011 - Parasparam - poetry collection
- 2015 - Vykkol Pava - poetry collection
