= Prabha Varma =

Indian journalist, poet and television presenter (born 1959)

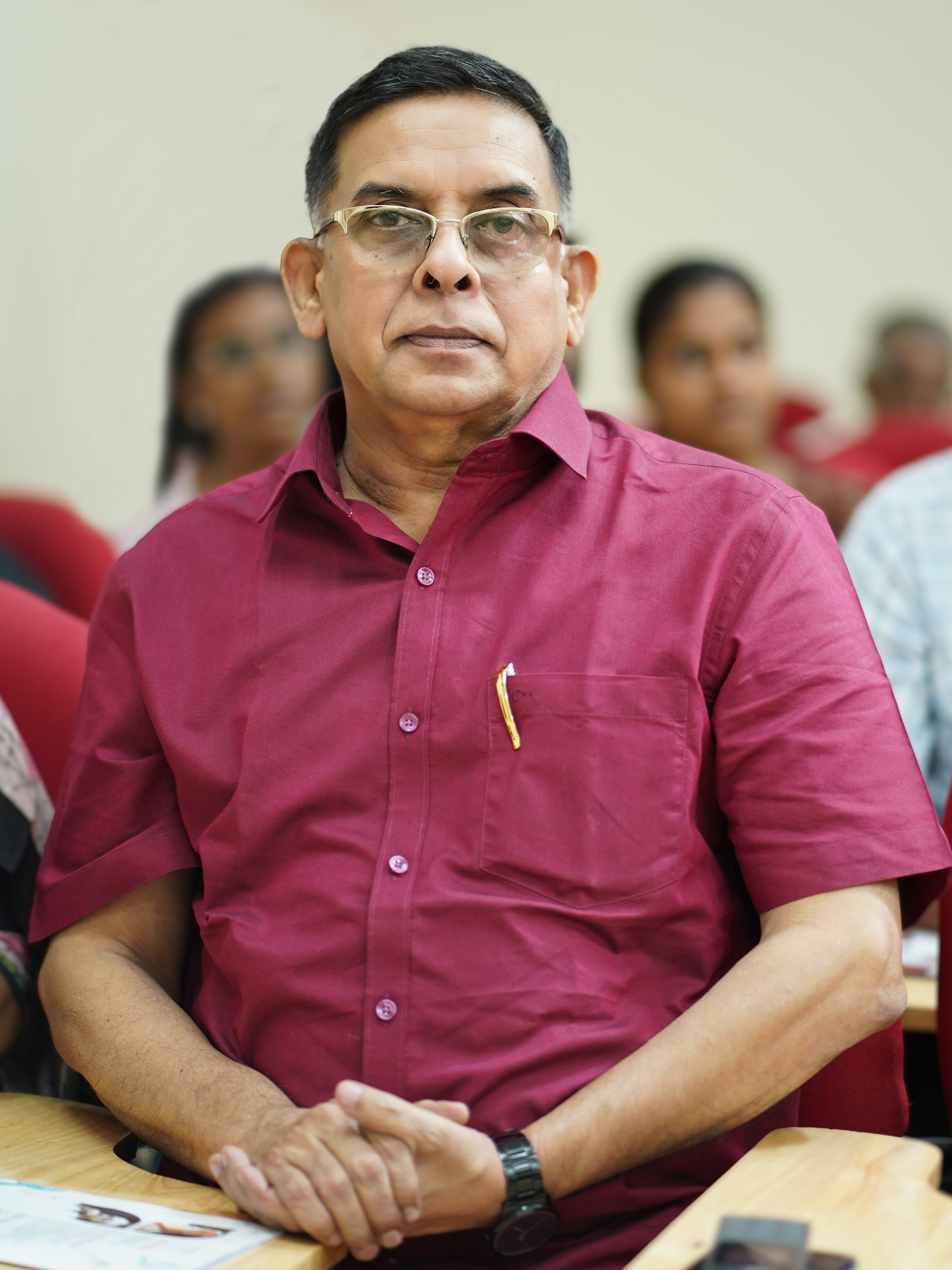
- Born: 30 May 1959 (age 67)
- Education: MA, LL.B.
- Alma mater: Devaswom Board College, Parumala; NSS Hindu College, Changanassery; Kerala Law Academy Law College, Trivandrum
- Occupations: Poet, lyricist, journalist, television presenter, Media Advisor to the Chief Minister of Kerala
- Spouse: Manorema
- Writing career
- Language: Malayalam, English
- Notable awards: Sahitya Akademi Award, Kerala Sahitya Akademi Award, Vayalar Award, Asan Prize, Ulloor Award, Vallathol Award

Prabha Varma (born 30 May 1959) is a poet, lyricist, journalist and television presenter known for his works in Malayalam cinema. He has published ten collections of poems, three novels in verse, six books on the contemporary socio-political milieu and literature, six collections of essays in criticism, a study on media, a travelogue and a novel in English.

== Early years and personal life ==
Prabha Varma was born in 1959 at Kadapra, Thiruvalla as the youngest son of late T. K. Narayanan Namboothiri and late N. Pankajakshi Thampuratty. He had four siblings - two brothers and two sisters. Varma has a master's degree and a degree in law. He studied at the Devaswom Board College, Parumala, NSS Hindu College, Changanassery, and Kerala Law Academy Law College, Trivandrum. He was a student activist and was elected to the executive of the Kerala University Union during the academic year of 1979–80. Varma's family comprises Manorema (wife), Jyotsna (daughter), Col. K.V Mahendra (son-in-law) and Jahnavi (Grand Daughter). Jyothir Mahendra (Grand Son)

== Career ==
=== Literary career ===
Varma's first collection of poems was Sourparnika, published in 1990. It won him the Vyloppilli Award and also the Ankanam Award. His second anthology Arkkapoornima won the Kerala Sahitya Akademi Award for Poetry. This was followed by poetical collections like Chandananazhi, Aaardram, Kalaprayaga, Avicharitham, Manjinotu Veyil Enna Poleyum, Aparigraham and Ponnin Kolus. He has also published collections of his poems.

His magnum opus Shyama Madhavam is a novel in verse (kaavyakhyayika) in 15 chapters. It revolves around Lord Krishna and the lives of those who came across him during his earthly sojourn, which the poet says is not a series of ecstasies as many believe, but agonies. It portrays the travails of a solitary soul and the rare courage with which Krishna deals with life. The work begins in a dramatically poignant and pensive mood and culminates in his swargaarohana, between which he lapses into a series of confessions and repentance. Shyama Madhavam offers a wide spectrum of Chhandas, Alankaaras and metric patterns such as Dandakas on the one hand and brings out the genuine concern of the lonely inner voice of the legendary hero against the backdrop of changing times. Varma received the Vayalar Award (2013), Malayattoor Award (2013) and the Central Sahitya Akademi Award for this work. Shyama Madhavam was adjudged as the best book of the decade by the Kerala State Library Council in the year 2020. Shyama Madhavam has been published in English with the title Lament of the Dusky Lord.

Varma's other work is Kanal Chilambu, which is a novella in verse. The story, told in seven chapters of around five thousand words, is about love, lust, intrigue, power, revenge and incest. In short, all the elements that go into the making of tragedies are in full play here. Most importantly, this poignant story of love and revenge answers an age-old riddle that posits the question: "why did the milkmaid laugh when her earthen pot of milk fell to doom?" This is the second narrative poem written by Prabha Varma after Shyama Madhavam. The professional drama based on Kanal Chilambu was staged on more than 500 stages all over Kerala. Shyama Madhavam was also repeatedly staged as a musical drama. The English version of Kanal Chilambu has been published with the title "Anklet of Fire".

The third novel in verse is Roudra Sathwikam, which deals with the perennial conflict that exists between art and power. It is placed against the backdrop of the erstwhile Soviet Union and in it, the poet addresses the binary opposites, such as violence/non-violence, poetry/power, environment/development, etc.

Other works he has penned include a travelogue titled Diary of Malaysia, Paarayanathinte Reethibhedangal (essays in criticism), Kevalathwavum Bhavukathwavum (Poetics), Rathiyude Kaavyapadangal Thanthree Laya Samanvitham (Analytical Study of Poems), Innilekku Oru Jaalekam (Political Essays), Drishyamadhyamangalum Samskaravum (Media Study), Sandehiyude Ekanthayaathra and Dala Marmaram (Reminiscences).

Jnanpith Award O. N. V. Kurup complimented Varma, saying, "He has inherited the subtle poetic richness of the eminent poet Vyloppilly Sreedhara Menon, who himself picked up the quality from Kumaranasan'. Literary critic M. Krishnan Nair wrote that "Prabha Varma is a born poet". Varma's poems are composed of a confluence of tradition and modernity. They have soft romantic emotions, a plethora of poetic images, original and innovative narrative skill, philosophical insights, and a deep understanding of the meaning of life.

Varma is a recipient of numerous awards. They include the Vayalar Award, Asan Prize, Ulloor Award, Vallathol Award, Vyloppilli Award (1990), Kunchupillai Award (1993), Krishnageethi Puraskar (1994), Mooloor Award (1995), Changampuzha Award (1997), Mahakavi P Puraskaram (1997), Kadavanad Award (1999), Abu Dhabi Sakthi Award (1987), Vennikulam Award (2003), A.P. Kalakkad Award (2006), Kannassa Puraskaram (2011), Kadathanad Udayavarma Puraskaram (2006), Mullanezhi Award (2012), Premji Puraskaram (2012), Malayattoor Award (2013) Mahakavi Pandalam Keralavarma Kavitha Puraskaram (2016), Padmaprabha Award (2016), Kesavadev Award (2018), Edasseri Award (2020), JKV Award, Mar Gregorious Award, and Bahrain Keraleeya Samajam Award.

=== Lyricist ===
Varma is a lyricist in Malayalam cinema and bagged 'the National Film Award for Best Lyrics in 2019. He also won the Kerala State Film Award for Best Lyricist three times (2006, 2013, 2012). Nadan, Sheelabathi, Saayahnam, Sthithi, Kalaapam, Gramapanchayath, Nagravadhu, Ee Puzhayum Kadannu, Varsha, Hareendran Oru Nishkalankan, Odiyan, Thakkol, Thelivu, Clint, Kolambi, Kunhalimarikkar etc. are some of the films for which he has written lyrics. He won the Kerala Film Critics Association Awards for Best Lyricict for the songs of Nagaravadhu in 2000 and Nadan in 2013. He won the State Government Awards for Best Lyrics for Professional Dramas in the years 2009 and 2017. His film songs "Oru Chembaneer Pooviruthu" (Sthithi, 2003), "Poonthen Nermozhi" were hits. When Varma bagged the 67th National Film Award for the best lyrics in 2019 for his song "Aarodum Parayuka Vayya" it was widely noted as he was bringing the national award for lyrics to Malayalam after a gap of two decades.

Varma has written many padams for Mohiniyattam, which is a classical dance form of Kerala. Pranab Mukherjee, the former President of India, honoured him at the Rashtrapathi Bhavan with a citation and shawl for his lyrical contribution to performing arts in the year 2016. He has composed more than a dozen classical kritis which are set to ragas and sung profusely in Carnatic music concerts.

=== Journalist ===
Varma has been a media personality for the last 40 years. All these years, he has been contributing articles to various journals, both in Malayalam and English. He won the State Government Award for the best general reporting in 1996. In 1988–90, the Trivandrum Press Club conferred on him the K. C. Sabastian Award. He also received the K. Madhavan Kutty Award for the best feature in English and Dr. B.R. Ambedkar Award. He also won the Media Trust award and K C. Daniel Award.

Varma presented a paper on 'Emerging Democracies', at the Doha International Meet, held under the auspices of the United Nations. He attended the world youth festival held in Pyongyang, North Korea in the 80s and addressed the North American journalist's conference held in New York in 2009. He has covered both the houses of the Indian Parliament, the Non-aligned Summit, Commonwealth Meet, etc. for more than a decade.

Varma was the Director (News) of People TV, Kairali TV from 2001– 2010, and has won the State Government award, Drishya TV Award etc. The weekly programme 'India Inside,' presented by him was an in-depth analysis of the socio-political labyrinth of the present-day world. He has also published a book on the social influence of electronic media, titled Drishyamadhyamangalum Samskaravum.

=== Positions held ===
Varma worked as the Press Secretary to the Chief Minister of Kerala for a period of five years from 1996 to 2001 and as the Resident Editor of Deshabhimani, the third largest circulated daily in Kerala. Other public offices he has held are as a member of the General Council of the Kendra Sahitya Academy Delhi between 2007 and 2012, and as the Vice-President of the Kerala Sahitya Academy between 2008 and 2010.

Presently he is the Media Advisor to the Chief Minister of Kerala, Executive member of the Sahithya Academy, Delhi (National Academy of Letters) convener of the South Indian board of Kendra Sahithya Academy, member of Kerala Sahithya Academy and the convener of Malayalam advisory council of Kendra Sahithya Academy. He is a member of the final jury of Jnanpith Award.

== Works ==
=== Poetry ===
- Souparnika
- Arkkapoornima
- Chandana Nazhi
- Aardram
- Kalaprayaga
- Avicharitham
- Manjinodu Veyil Ennapoleyum
- Shyama Madhavam (Novel in verse)
- Aparigraham
- Kanal Chilambu (Novel in verse)
- Roudra Satwikam (Novel in verse)
- Ponninkoluss

=== Others ===
- Rethiyude Kaavyapadam (Study)
- Kevalathwavum Bhavukathwavum (Study)
- Drishya Maadhyamangalum Samskaaravum (Study)
- Enthukondu Fascism? (Study)
- Innilekku Oru Jaalakam (Essays)
- Sandehiyude Ekantha Yaathra (Reminiscences)
- Parayanathinte Reethibhedangal (Essays)
- Malaysian Diary Kurippukal (Travelogue)
- Thanthree Laya Samanvitham
- After the Aftermath (English novel)

== Awards ==
Poetry

- 1987: Abu Dhabi Sakthi Award – Mrithyumjayam
- 1987: V. T. Kumaran Award
- 1990: Vyloppilli Award
- 1993: Kunjupilla Award
- 1995: Kerala Sahitya Akademi Award for Poetry – Arkkapoornima
- 1995: Mooloor Award
- 1997: Changampuzha Puraskaram
- 1998: P. Kunhiraman Nair Award – Chandana Nazhi
- 1999: Kadavanad Award
- 2003: Vennikkulam Award
- 2006: Kadathanadu Udayavarmma Puraskaram
- 2006: A.P. Kalakkad Award
- 2011: Kannassa Puraskaram
- 2012: Premji Puraskaram
- 2012: Mullanezhi Puraskaram
- 2013: Vayalar Award – Shyama Madhavam
- 2013: Malayattoor Award – Shyama Madhavam
- 2014: Asan Poetry Prize
- 2016: Kendra Sahitya Akademi Award – Shyama Madhavam
- 2016: Padmaprabha Literary Award
- 2016: Mahakavi Pandalam Keralavarma Poetry Award – Aparigraham
- 2017: Vallathol Award
- 2017: Ulloor Award – Aparigraham
- 2017: Bahrain Kerala Samajam Award
- 2018: P. Kesavadev Literary Award
- 2019: J. K. V. Literary Award – Kanal Chilambu
- 2020: State Library Council Award – Shyama Madhavam
- 2020: Kunchan Nambiar Award
- 2023: Saraswati Samman – Roudra Sathwikam
- Mar Gregorius Award
- Krishnageethi Puraskaram
- T S Thirumumpu Puraskaram
- Venmani Award
- Sreekanteswaram Puraskaram
- Ankanam Award
- Ezhumangalam Puraskaram
- Kuwait Kala Puraskaram
- Sidhartha Sahitya Puraskaram

Journalism

- Kerala State Journalism Award for Best General Reporting
- K. Madhavankutty Award for the Best English Feature
- Media Trust Award For Journalism
- K. C. Sebastian Puraskaram
- Special Mention in State TV Awards

Film

- 2000: Kerala Film Critics Association Award for Best Lyricist – Nagaravadhu
- 2003: Filmfare Award for Best Lyricist – Malayalam (Nominated) – "Oru Chempaneer Pooviruthu" from Sthithi
- 2006: Kerala State Film Award for Best Lyrics – "Poyi Varuvan Koode Varu" from Out of Syllabus
- 2013: Kerala State Film Award for Best Lyrics – "Ethu Sundara Swapna Yavanika" from Nadan
- 2013: Kerala Film Critics Association Award for Best Lyricist – Nadan
- 2017: Kerala State Film Award for Best Lyrics – "Olathin Melathal" from Clint
- 2019: National Film Award for Best Lyrics – "Arodum Parayuka Vayya" from Kolaambi
- 2018: Adoor Bhasi Award
- 2021: Prem Nazir Film Award for Best Lyrics – ("Ilaveyil" from Marakkar: Arabikadalinte Simham and "Kanneer Kadalil" from Uru)
- Kerala Sangeetha Nataka Akademi Awards for the Best Lyrics of Drama (twice)
