= Anagha J. Kolath =

Indian Malayalam language poet

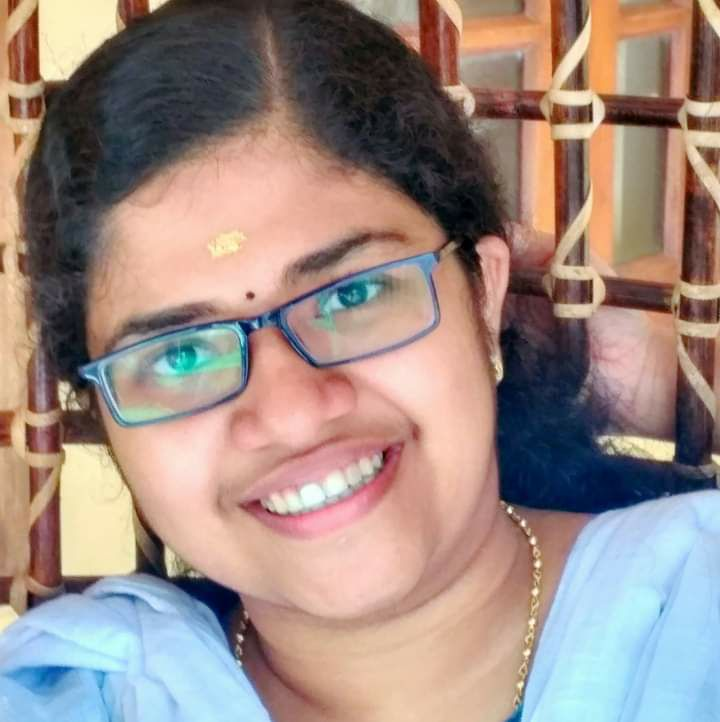
- Born: December 1994 (age 31); Kottayam district, Kerala, India
- Occupation: poet
- Writing career
- Notable work: Mezhukuthirikku Swantham Theeppetti
- Notable awards: Yuva Puraskar 2022

Anagha J. Kolath is a Malayalam language poet from Kerala, India. In 2022, she received Sahitya Akademi Yuva Puraskar.

== Biography ==
Anagha J. Kolath was born in 1994, at Kolath House in Pala, Kottayam district of Kerala, the youngest of three daughters of KN Jayachandran, a bank officer, and PG Shyamaladevi, a retired school teacher. She has two sisters Anjana and Archana.

Anagha done her primary education at Pala Sakthivilasam NSS School. After passing Plus Two from NSSHSS, Kitangur, she graduated in English from Government Women's College, Thiruvananthapuram. After passing post graduation from NSS Hindu College in Changanassery, Anagha studied at the School of Letters to obtain her Masters in Malayalam.

== Literary career ==
Anagha wrote her first poem while in the second grade. She is good not only at writing poetry but also at reciting it. From a young age, she participated in the Narayaniyam and Poonthanam reciting competitions held by the Guruvayoor Devaswom. In 2013, she was awarded the Suvarna mudra (Golden Seal) from Guruvayoor temple. She has also won the third position in a poetry recitation competition on a leading Malayalam channel.

== Works ==
It was the writer K. Jayakumar who forced Anagha, who was reluctant to compile and publish her poems, to publish the poem and provided the necessary assistance. Anagha's first collection of poems titled Njan Arinja Kadal, including about 30 poems, was published in 2014. A poetry recital CD called Kavyamritham has also been released with 51 poems. She was selected for Sahitya Akademi's online Kaviyarang (poetry discussion platform) in 2020.

Apart from poetry, Anagha is active in writing stories and articles in periodicals and online.

== Awards and honours ==
Anagha has won many awards including Akashvani Yuvavani Award for best poetry, received on the International Day of Mother Tongue-2014, Ankanam Kavitha Award (2014) K M Sukumaran Memorial Award for College students (2014) and Punalur Balan Poetry Award (2020). In 2022, she received Sahitya Akademi Yuva Puraskar for her poetry collection Mezhukuthirikku Swantham Theeppetti.
