= M. Balamuralikrishna =

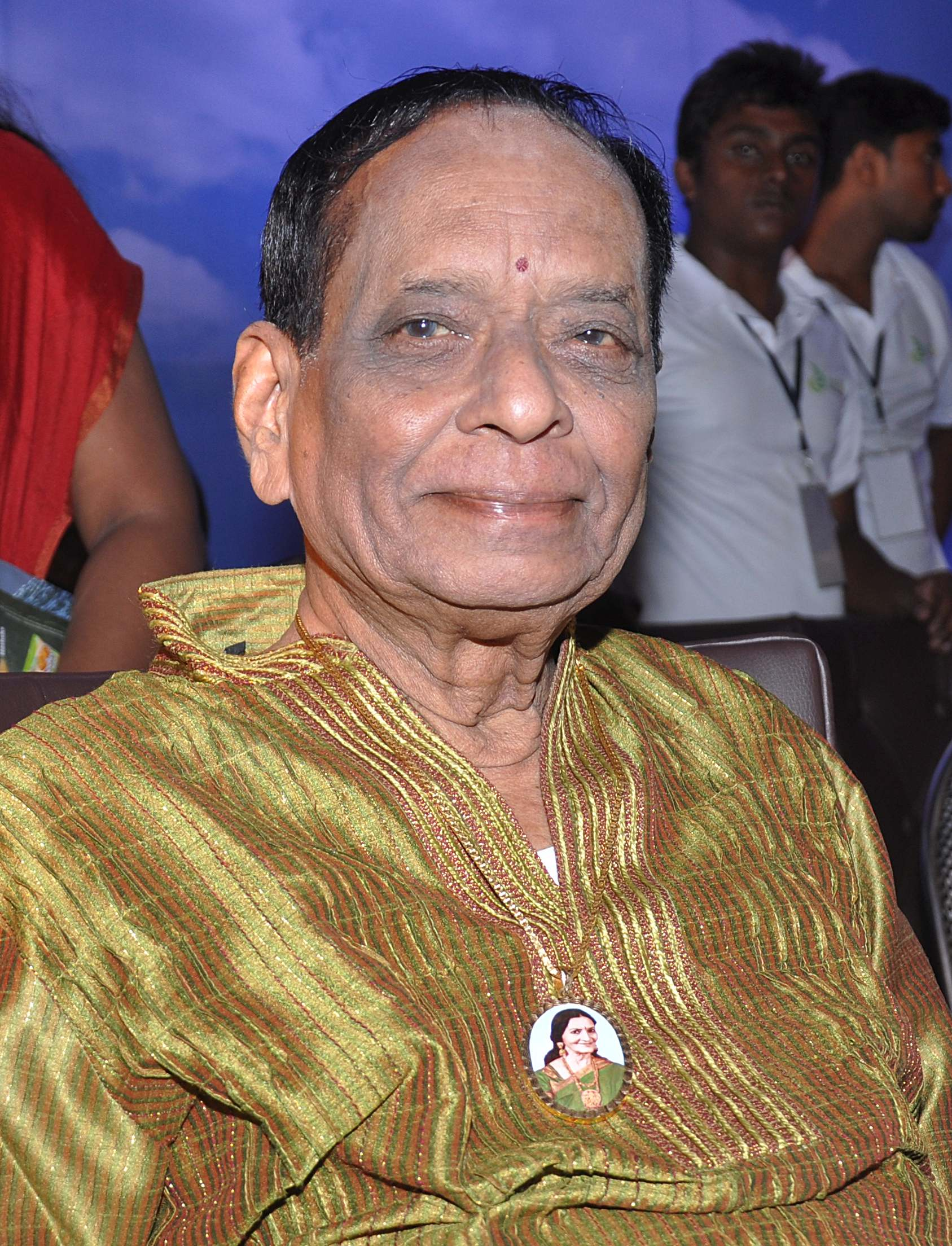
- Balamuralikrishna at Rajarani Music Festival, Bhubaneswar, Odisha

Background information
- Born: Mangalampalli Balamuralikrishna; 6 July 1930; Sankaraguptam, East Godavari District, Andhra Pradesh, India
- Died: 22 November 2016 (aged 86) Chennai, Tamil Nadu, India
- Genre: Carnatic music
- Occupations: Musician
- Instruments: Vocals, Viola, Mridangam, Kanjira
- Years active: 1938–2016
- Labels: Lahari Music, Sangeetha, PM Audios & Entertainments, Aditya Music
- Awards: Padma Vibhushan 1991

Mangalampalli Balamuralikrishna (né Muralikrishna; 6 July 1930 – 22 November 2016) was an Indian Carnatic vocalist, musician, multi-instrumentalist, playback singer, composer, and character actor. He was awarded the Madras Music Academy's Sangeetha Kalanidhi in 1978. He garnered two National Film Awards (1976, 1987), the Sangeet Natak Akademi Award in 1975, the Padma Vibhushan, India's second-highest civilian honor in 1991, for his contribution towards arts, the Mahatma Gandhi Silver Medal from UNESCO in 1995, the Chevalier of the Ordre des Arts et des Lettres by the French Government in 2005, the Sangeetha Kalanidhi by Madras Music Academy, and the Sangeetha Kalasikhamani in 1991, by the Fine Arts Society, Chennai to name a few.

Balamuralikrishna started his career at the age of six. In his life-time, he gave over 25,000 concerts worldwide. Apart from Pandit Bhimsen Joshi, he presented jugalbandi concerts (duets) with Pandit Hariprasad Chaurasia, Pandit Ajoy Chakrabarty and Kishori Amonkar, among others. He is also known for popularizing the compositions of Sri Bhadrachala Ramadasu, Sri Annamacharya, and others.

Balamuralikrishna's concerts combined sophisticated vocal skills and rhythmic patterns of classical music with the popular demand for entertainment value. Balamuralikrishna presented concerts in many countries, including the US, Canada, UK, Italy, France, Russia, Sri Lanka, Malaysia, Singapore, countries in the Middle East, and elsewhere. Apart from his native tongue, Telugu, he has also composed in other languages including Kannada, Sanskrit, Tamil, Malayalam, Hindi, Bengali, and Punjabi.

He appeared as a featured soloist with an award-winning British choir, performing the "Gitanjali Suite" with words from Rabindranath Tagore's Nobel Prize-winning poetry and music by "Dr. Joel", the noted UK-based Goan composer. His clear diction in several languages prompted an invitation to record Tagore's entire Rabindra Sangeet compositions in Bengali, preserving them for posterity. He had sung in French, and even ventured into jazz fusion, collaborating with the top Carnatic percussion teacher, Sri T.H. Subash Chandran, in a concert for Malaysian royalty.

== Early life ==
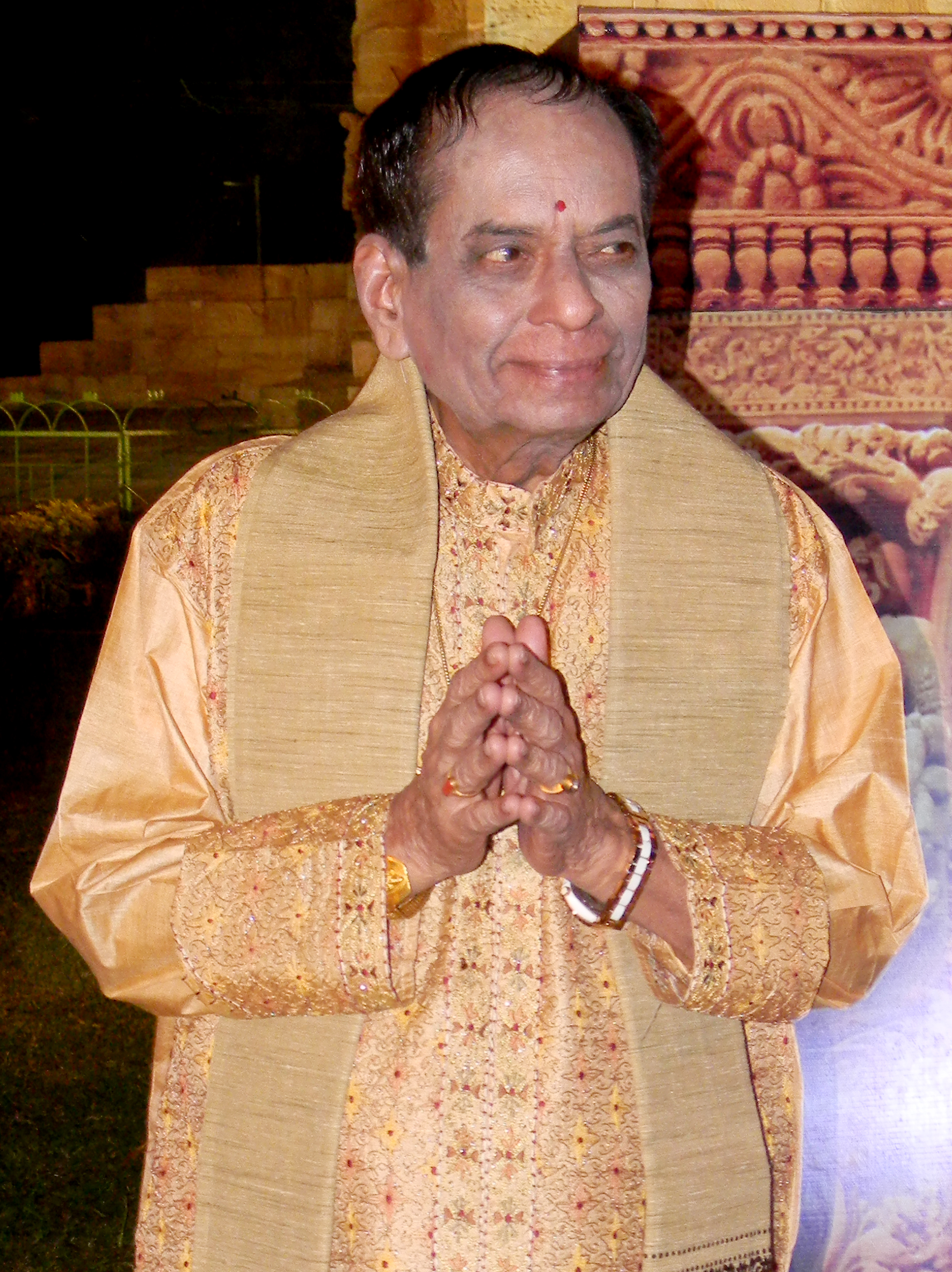
M. Balamuralikrishna during Rajarani Music Festival at Bhubaneswar on 19 January 2013

Balamuralikrishna was born in a Hindu family at Sankaraguptam, East Godavari District, Madras Presidency (now a part of Andhra Pradesh state). His father, Mangalampalli Pattabhiramayya, was a well known musician and his mother, Suryakanthamma, was a veena player. Balamuralikrishna's mother died when he was an infant and he was raised by his father. Observing his interest in music, his father put him under the tutelage of Parupalli Ramakrishnayya Pantulu, a direct descendant of the shishya parampara (lineage of disciples) of Tyagaraja. Under his guidance, the young Balamuralikrishna learned Carnatic music. At the age of eight, he gave his first full-fledged concert at a Thyagaraja Aradhana in Vijayawada. Musunuri Suryanarayana Murty Bhagavatar, a Harikatha performer, saw the musical talent in him and gave the prefix "Bala" (lit. child) to the young Balamuralikrishna. (Prior to this, his name was Muralikrishna; following Bhagavatar's addition of the prefix, he began to be known as Balamuralikrishna.)

Having begun his musical career at a very young age, by age fifteen he had mastered all the 72 melakartha ragas and had composed krithis in each of them. His Janaka Raga Manjari was published in 1952 and recorded as Raagaanga Ravali in a nine-volume series by the Sangeeta Recording Company. Not merely content with his fame as a Carnatic vocalist, he also played the kanjira, mridangam, viola, and violin. He accompanied various musicians on the violin. He also presented solo viola concerts. He was the person who introduced viola to classical Indian music.

== Experimentation ==
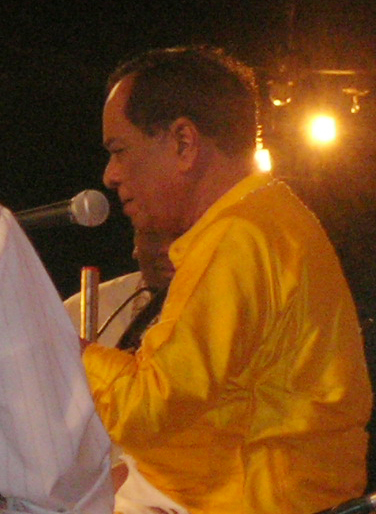
Balamuralikrishna performs in 2005

Characteristic of Balamuralikrishna's musical journey have been his non-conformism, spirit of experimentation, and boundless creativity. Balamuralikrishna has experimented with the Carnatic music system by keeping its rich tradition untouched. Ragas such as Ganapathi, Sarvashri, Mahati, Lavangi etc. are credited to him. The ragas which he invented represent his quest for new frontiers. Ragas such as Lavangi are set to three or four notes in ascending and descending scale. Ragas such as Mahathi, Lavangi, Sidhdhi, Sumukham that he created have only four notes; while his other ragaa creations such as Sarva Sri, Omkaari, and Ganapathy have only three notes.

He also innovated in the tala (rhythm) system. He has incorporated "gati bhEdam" (గతి భేదం) in the "sashabda kriya" (సశబ్ద క్రియ). Actions that can produce sound/shabda (శబ్ద) in talas are called sashabda kriya – సశబ్ద క్రియ and are a part of the existing Tala chain. New chains are possible, too. Saint Arunagirinaadhar used to inject such systems in his famous Thirupugazh, but only as Sandham, while Balamuralikrishna is known to be the pioneer in bringing such Sandhams into a logical rhythm, with Angam and definition. Trimukhi, Panchamukhi, Saptamukhi, and Navamukhi are the basic classifications in his New Tala System.

He gave his authorisation to S. Ram Bharati to found "Academy of Performing Arts and Research" in Switzerland. He also worked on music therapy. After his death, his family started a trust in his name 'Dr.M.Balamuralikrishna Memorial Trust' to honor and keep his legacy alive.

== Compositions ==
Balamuralikrishna has over 400 compositions to his credit including varnams, kritis, thillanas and devotional songs. He was also one of the few composers to have composed in all 72 melakarta ragas and created several ragas using four or three notes, as well as a new tala system. His compositions encompass every genre in Carnatic Music including Varnas, Krithis, Thillanas, Bhavageethas.

== Cinema ==
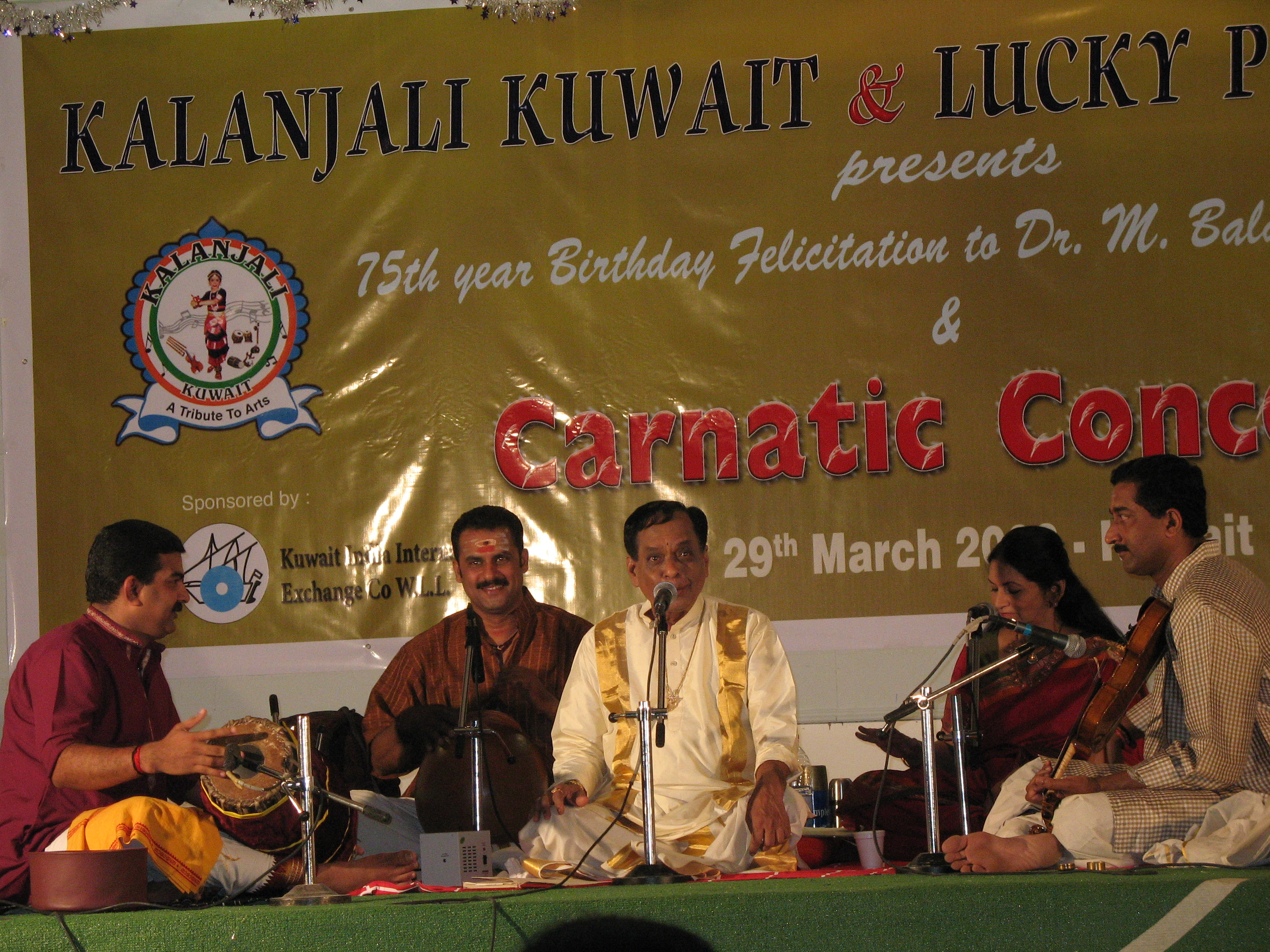
Balamuralikrishna during a concert in Kuwait on 29 March 2006, accompanied by Mavelikkara Sathees Chandran (violin), Perunna G. Harikumar (mridangam), Manjoor Unnikrishnan (ghatam)

Balamuralikrishna has sung in several films in Telugu, Sanskrit, Malayalam, Kannada and Tamil. He made his acting debut with the Telugu film Bhakta Prahlada (1967) as Narada, and has acted in a few other films in Telugu, Tamil and Malayalam.

== Death ==
Balamuralikrishna died at his residence in Chennai on 22 November 2016; he was 86. He died in deep sleep at around five in the evening, due to a cardiac arrest. He was cremated with full state honours at Besant Nagar Crematorium in Chennai the following day. Thousands attended his funeral. He is survived by three daughters and three sons who are all doctors. His wife, Smt. Annapurna, outlived him by three months, and died on 16 February 2017.

== Legacy ==
His family has formed the Dr. M. Balamurali Krishna Memorial Trust to represent him after his death.

== Awards and honours ==
=== Civilian honours ===
- Padma Shri (1971)
- Padma Bhushan
- Padma Vibhushan (1991)
- Chevalier of the Ordre des Arts et des Lettres from the Government of France (2005)

=== National Film Awards (India) ===
- Best Male Playback Singer for the Kannada musical movie Hamsageethe (1975)
- Best Music Direction for the Kannada film Madhvacharya (1986)

==== Kerala State Film Award ====
- Best singer for Swathi Thirunal (1987)
- Best Classical Music Singer for Gramam (2010)

==== Tamil Nadu State Film Award ====
- Best Male Playback singer for Pasanga (2009)

=== Other honours ===
- Sangeet Natak Akademi Award (1975)
- Sangeetha Kalanidhi by Madras Music Academy (1978)
- Raja-Lakshmi Award in 1980 by Sri Raja-Lakshmi Foundation in Chennai
- Doctor of Letters from Shri Venkateshwara University (1981)
- Honorary PhD from Andhra University
- Doctor of Science from Andhra University
- Doctor of Letters from Andhra University
- Sangeetha Kalasikhamani by The Fine Arts Society, Chennai (1991)
- Mahatma Gandhi Silver Medal from UNESCO (1995)
- Natya Kalasikhamani The Fine Arts Society, Chennai (2001)
- Sangeetha Kalasarathy (2002)
- "Sangeetha Virinchi" title conferred by Sangeetha Bharathi music School, Auckland, New Zealand (2009)
- Lifetime Achievement Award by the Global Indian Music Academy Awards (2011)
- First Citizen Award from Vijayawada City
- "Wisdom Man of the Year" (1992)
- "Naada Maharishi" by the Nrityalaya Aesthetics Society (1996)

A documentary film, The Melody Man, was made on his life by the Government of India Films Division. The film was directed by National award winner Director Gul Bahar Singh.

- Telugu Book of Records honoured him for Telugu Legendary Personality in 2014 at Vijayawada
- Kalidas Samman (2001)

== Guru Of ==
- Ajoy Chakraborty
- Prince Rama Varma
- Aruna Sayeeram
- Kamala Haasan
- Vyjayanthimala Bali

== Ragas created ==
Ragam	Scale	Remarks	Ref.
Ganapati	Arohanam: S G2 P S Avarohanam: S P G2 S		
Lavangi	Arohanam: S R1 M1 D1 S Avarohanam: S D1 M1 R1 S		
Sarvasri (Trishakti)	Arohanam: S M1 P S Avarohanam: S P M1 S	Renamed to Trishakti	
Mahati	Arohanam: S G3 P N2 S Avarohanam: S N2 P G3 S		
Mohana Gandhi		Created in honor of Mahatma Gandhi	
Sushama	Arohanam: S R2 M1 P D1 S Avarohanam: S D1 P M1 R2 S		
Pushkara Godavari	Arohanam: S R2 M1 D2 S Avarohanam: S D2 M1 R2 S	On the occasion of Godavari Pushakaras	
Jaya Jaya Lalitha		In honor of Tamil Nadu Chief Minister Jayalalithaa	

== Talas created ==
The 'Mukhi' Tala system builds on the traditional Adhi Tala or Chathusra Jaathi Triputa Tala ( I 0 0 ), however the first kriya or mukha (meaning face) of each anga takes the gathi of its tala name and the rest in chathusra gathi. For example: Panchamukhi – the first kriya of each anga will be in kanda gathi and so the tala consists of 35 Matras (5 + 4 + 4 + 4 | 5 + 4 | 5 + 4 || ).

Following this method, four Talas can be generated:

The Mukhi Talas
Tala	Structure	Matras
Trimukkhi	3 + 4 + 4 + 4 | 3 + 4 | 3 + 4 ||	29
Panchamukhi	5 + 4 + 4 + 4 | 5 + 4 | 5 + 4 ||	35
Sapthamukhi	7 + 4 + 4 + 4 | 7 + 4 | 7 + 4 ||	41
Navamukhi	9 + 4 + 4 + 4 | 9 + 4 | 9 + 4 ||	47

This scheme can be extended across all 35 sooladi thalas, however currently these four are in practice.

Compositions:

There have been many pallavis set to panchamukhi Tala such as 'Isai inbathirku ēdillaye ivulakil – sentamil' in ragam Lathangi composed by Amrutha Venkatesh and 'Aadi Vaa, Pirai Soodi Vaa, Aalavaai Naathane' in ragam Abheri composed by Rameshvaidya and tuned by S.J Jananiy and also others in Bilahari, Thodi and Kalyani composed by Dr. Balamuralikrishna himself.

There have also been Alarippus composed for Bharathanatyam in Panchamukhi.

== Selected compositions ==
Composition	Ragam	Type	Deity/Saint	Remarks
Omkaara Pranava	Shanmukhapriya	Varnam	Ganesha	
Amma Anandha Dayini	Gambhiranata	Varnam		
Ye Naadhamu	Naata	Varnam		
Chalamu Chaesina	Ramapriya	Varnam		
Aapaala Gopaalamu	Amritavarshini	Varnam		
Ninu Nera Nammithi	Kharaharapriya	Varnam		
Entha Sudiname	Shankarabharanam	Varnam		
Vesariti Neeve	Khamas	Varnam		
Saraguna Gaavamu	Hanumatodi	Varnam		
Saakaara Sadguna	Raga Svarashtram(Combination of Sourashtram, Chakravakam and Suryakantham)	Varnam		
Sri Sakala Ganadhipa Palayamam	Aarabhi	Kriti		Three Pallavis on Ganapathy, Maaruthi and Krishna
Mahadevasutham	Aarabhi	Kriti	Ganesha	
Gam Gam Ganapathim	Ganapathi	Kriti	Ganesha	on Ganapathi-Tri Tonal Raga: Sa Ga Pa
Ganaadhipam	Nattai	Kriti	Ganesha	
Pirai Aniyum Perumaan	Hamsadhvani	Kriti	Ganesha	
Uma Sutham Namaami	Sarvasri	Kriti	Ganesha	on Ganapathi-Tri Tonal Raga: Sa Ma Pa
Mahaneeya Namasulivae	Sumukham	Kriti	Ganesha	on Ganapathi-Tetra Tonal Raga: Sa Ri Ma Ni
Omkara karini	Lavangi	Kriti	Durga	Tetra Tonal Raga: Sa Ri Ma Dha
Sidhdhi Naayakena	Amritavarshini	Kriti	Ganesha	
Sidhdhim Dhehi Mae	Sidhdhi	Kriti	Ganesha	on Ganapathi-Tri Tonal Raga: Sa Ri Dha
Heera Ganapathiki	Surati	Kriti	Ganesha	
Mahaneeya Madhura Moorthae	Mahathi	Kriti	Guru	Ode to Guru-Tetra Tonal Raga: Sa Ga PA Ni
Guruni Smarimpumo	Hamsavinodhini	Kriti	Guru	Ode to Guru
Varuha Varuha	Panthuvaraali	Kriti	Kartikeya	
Thunai Neeyae	Charukesi	Kriti	Kartikeya	
Nee Dhaya Raadha	Poorvikalyani	Kriti	Durga	
Gathi Neeve	Kalyani	Kriti	Durga	
Siva Ganga	Nagasvaravali	Kriti	Durga	
Maa Maanini	Thodi	Kriti	Durga	on Ambika-Swara Saahithyam
Amma Ninukori	Kamas	Kriti	Durga	
Gaana Maalinchi	Kalyanavasantam	Kriti	Durga	
Sadhaa Thava Paadha	Shanmukhapriya	Kriti	Shiva	
Bruhadheeswara	Kaanada	Kriti	Shiva	Composed on Brihadeeswarar in Thanjavur
Thripura Tharpa			Shiva	Mangalam on Siva
Kamala Dhalaayatha	Bahudari	Kriti		on Nethra Soundharya
Thillana	Brundhaavani	Thillana		Telugu Charanam
Thillana	Chakravaaham	Thillana		
Thillana	Dhwijaawanthi	Thillana		Tamil Charanam
Thillana	Kunthalvaraali	Thillana		Tamil and Telugu Charanam
Thillana	Kathanakuthoohalam	Thillana		
Thillana	Garudadhvani	Thillana		Paanini Sutra Reference,
Thillana	Behag	Thillana	Tyagaraja	
Thillana	Ragamalika	Thillana		Amritavarshini, Mohanam, Kannada and Hindolam
Thillana	Ragamalika	Thillana		Taaya Ragamaalika, Based on Sruthi Bhedam
Thillana	Ragamalika	Thillana		Pancha "Priya" Raagas, with Gathi Bhedam
Maamava Gaana Lola	Rohini	Kriti		Ragam using two Madhyamas
Gaana Lola	Ragamalika	Kriti	Vishnu	Composed on Venkateshvara in Tirumala
Sangeethamae	Kalyani	Kriti		About Music
Nee Saati Neevae	Chandrika	Kriti	Vishnu	
Sankarabharana Sayanuda	Sankarabharanam	Kriti	Vishnu	
Vegamae	Abhogi	Kriti	Vishnu	
Hanuma	Sarasangi	Kriti	Hanuman	
Vandhe Maatharam	Ranjani	Kriti	Bharat Mata	
Gaana Sudha Rasa	Naattai	Kriti	Tyagaraja	
Sama Gana	Amritavarshini	Kriti	Tyagaraja	
Maragatha Simhasana	Simhendra Madhyamam	Kriti	Vishnu	on Yadhagiri Narasimha
Simha Rupa Dheva	Kambhoji	Kriti	Vishnu	on Narasimha
Raja Raja	Sankarabharanam	Kriti	Raghavendra Tirtha	
Chintayami satatam Sri Muttuswami Dikshitam	Sucharitra	Kriti	Muthuswami Dikshitar	
Ambamamava	Ragamalika	Kriti		Ragas: Ranjani, Niranjani and Janaranjani
Bangaaru Murali Sringaara Ravali	Neelambari	Kriti	Krishna	Composed on Krishna in Udupi
Bhaavame Mahaa Bhaagyamura	Kapi	Kriti		Sri Thyagaraja to Balamuralikrishna-Guru Parampara
Paahi Sameera Kumaara	Mandari	Kriti	Hanuman	description of Panchamukha Hanuman
Vasama	Dharmavathi	Kriti	Tripura Sundari	prayer on Lalita Devi

== Albums and songs ==
Balamuralikrishna has composed songs few albums and has sung, list of albums and songs below

Year	Album	Language	Song	Co-singer(s)	Lyrics	Record label	Ref(s)
2019	Kaiwara Amara Nareyanamrutam-Vol 1	Telugu	Meklukonave	Solo	Kaiwara Sri Yogi Nareyana	PM Audios & Entertainments	
2019	Kaiwara Amara Nareyanamrutam-Vol 1	Telugu	Sri Krishnayanu	Solo	Kaiwara Sri Yogi Nareyana	PM Audios & Entertainments	
2019	Kaiwara Amara Nareyanamrutam-Vol 1	Telugu	Brahmamu Nivera	Solo	Kaiwara Sri Yogi Nareyana	PM Audios & Entertainments	
2019	Kaiwara Amara Nareyanamrutam-Vol 1	Telugu	Pahi Ramaprabho	Solo	Kaiwara Sri Yogi Nareyana	PM Audios & Entertainments	
2019	Kaiwara Amara Nareyanamrutam-Vol 1	Telugu	Naadamu Vinarada	Solo	Kaiwara Sri Yogi Nareyana	PM Audios & Entertainments	
2019	Kaiwara Amara Nareyanamrutam-Vol 1	Telugu	Telisinandaku	Solo	Kaiwara Sri Yogi Nareyana	PM Audios & Entertainments	
2019	Kaiwara Amara Nareyanamrutam-Vol 1	Telugu	Agnaniye Merugu	Solo	Kaiwara Sri Yogi Nareyana	PM Audios & Entertainments	
2019	Kaiwara Amara Nareyanamrutam-Vol 1	Telugu	Sri Rama Nee Namamu	Solo	Kaiwara Sri Yogi Nareyana	PM Audios & Entertainments	
2019	Divine Collections of Sri Rama	Telugu	Pahi Ramaprabho Pahi Ramaprabho	Solo	Kaiwara Sri Yogi Nareyana	PM Audios & Entertainments	
2019	Divine Collections of Sri Rama	Telugu	Sri Rama Nee Namamu	Solo	Kaiwara Sri Yogi Nareyana	PM Audios & Entertainments	
2019	Ramuni Bhajana Seyave	Telugu	Chudu Chudu Adigo Chukka	Solo	Kaiwara Sri Yogi Nareyana	PM Audios & Entertainments	
2019	Ramuni Bhajana Seyave	Telugu	Sri Nareyana Nama	Solo	Kaiwara Sri Yogi Nareyana	PM Audios & Entertainments	
2019	Ramuni Bhajana Seyave	Telugu	Choodaganti Swamini	Solo	Kaiwara Sri Yogi Nareyana	PM Audios & Entertainments	
2019	Ramuni Bhajana Seyave	Telugu	Intaga Vedina Neramulenchaka	Solo	Kaiwara Sri Yogi Nareyana	PM Audios & Entertainments	
2019	Ramuni Bhajana Seyave	Telugu	Ramuni Bhajana Seyave	Solo	Kaiwara Sri Yogi Nareyana	PM Audios & Entertainments	
2019	Ramuni Bhajana Seyave	Telugu	Emi Sethura Krishna	Solo	Kaiwara Sri Yogi Nareyana	PM Audios & Entertainments	
2019	Ramuni Bhajana Seyave	Telugu	Kulamu Vidichinaramu	Solo	Kaiwara Sri Yogi Nareyana	PM Audios & Entertainments	
2019	Ramuni Bhajana Seyave	Telugu	Maravanoyamma Maguru Bhoodana	Solo	Kaiwara Sri Yogi Nareyana	PM Audios & Entertainments	
2019	Ramuni Bhajana Seyave	Telugu	Aru Matamulameeda	Solo	Kaiwara Sri Yogi Nareyana	PM Audios & Entertainments	

== Film compositions ==
Balamuralikrishna acted in few films and gave his voice to some selected songs in Indian cinema.

=== Singer ===
==== Film songs ====
Year	Film	Language	Song	Music director	Co-singer
1957	Sati Savitri	Telugu	Narayanathe Namo Namo	S. V. Venkatraman	
1957	Sati Savitri	Telugu	Poyenayyo Ippudu	S. V. Venkatraman	
1957	Sati Savitri	Telugu	Kshtriya Jaati Butti	S. V. Venkatraman	
1957	Sati Savitri	Telugu	Kurula Soubhagyambu	S. V. Venkatraman	
1957	Sati Savitri	Telugu	Kanudammul	S. V. Venkatraman	
1957	Sati Savitri	Telugu	Aluka Vahinchena	S. V. Venkatraman	
1957	Sati Savitri	Telugu	Vividhayudha	S. V. Venkatraman	
1959	Jayabheri	Telugu	Suklaam Brahma Vichaara Saara Paramaam (Sloka)	Pendyala Nageswara Rao	
1962	Swarna Gowri	Kannada	Natavara Gangaadhara Umashankara	M. Venkataraju	
1962	Swarna Gowri	Kannada	Jaya Jaya Narayana 1	M. Venkataraju	
1962	Swarna Gowri	Kannada	Jaya Jaya Narayana 2	M. Venkataraju	
1962	Swarna Gowri	Telugu	Palinchu Prabhuvula (Padyam)	M. Venkataraju	
1962	Swarna Gowri	Telugu	Jaya Jaya Narayana 1	M. Venkataraju	
1962	Swarna Gowri	Telugu	Jaya Jaya Narayana 2	M. Venkataraju	
1963	Nartanasala	Telugu	Salalitha Raga Sudharasa Saaram	S. Dakshinamurthi	Bangalore Latha
1964	Karna	Telugu	Punyame Idhiyanchu (Padyam)	Viswanathan–Ramamoorthy & R. Govardhanam	
1964	Karna	Telugu	Kunthiyu Andharu Puthrulu (Padyam)	Viswanathan–Ramamoorthy & R. Govardhanam	
1964	Karna	Telugu	Neevu Nenu Valachithime	Viswanathan–Ramamoorthy & R. Govardhanam	P. Susheela
1964	Karna	Telugu	Varalu Shanthashurulu (Padyam)	Viswanathan–Ramamoorthy & R. Govardhanam	
1964	Karna	Telugu	Shanthimbondhuta Neekun (Padyam)	Viswanathan–Ramamoorthy & R. Govardhanam	
1964	Karna	Telugu	Maranamme Yenchi Kalathapadu (Padyam)	Viswanathan–Ramamoorthy & R. Govardhanam	
1964	Karna	Telugu	Nanne Telusuko (Padyam)	Viswanathan–Ramamoorthy & R. Govardhanam	
1964	Karna	Telugu	Thana Dharmarakthitho	Viswanathan–Ramamoorthy & R. Govardhanam	
1964	Karna	Telugu	Sigguche Yerupekke	Viswanathan–Ramamoorthy & R. Govardhanam	
1964	Mahiravana	Telugu	Prabhavinchinanthane Bhaskaru (Padyam)	S. Rajeswara Rao	Ghantasala
1964	Mahiravana	Telugu	Sree Anjaneyam Prasannanjaneyam (Slokam)	S. Rajeswara Rao	
1964	Ramadasu	Telugu	Mogisi Japayagnamulu (Padyam)	G. Ashwathama & Chittor V. Nagaiah	
1964	Ramadasu	Telugu	Chorulu Korani Nidhiyai (Padyam)	G. Ashwathama & Chittor V. Nagaiah	
1964	Ramadasu	Telugu	Ye Mahaneeya Tejudu (Padyam)	G. Ashwathama & Chittor V. Nagaiah	
1964	Ramadasu	Telugu	Sri Rama Manthrambhu (Padyam)	G. Ashwathama & Chittor V. Nagaiah	
1965	Dorikite Dongalu	Telugu	Tirupativasa Srivenkatesa	S. Rajeswara Rao	P. Susheela & Bangalore Latha
1965	Kalai Kovil	Tamil	Thanga Radham Vandhadhu	Viswanathan–Ramamoorthy	P. Susheela
1965	Pandava Vanavasam	Telugu	Sri Vishnum Jagatham	Ghantasala	
1965	Thiruvilayadal	Tamil	Oru Naal Pothuma	K. V. Mahadevan	
1965	Uyyala Jampala	Telugu	Etiloni Keratalu	Pendyala Nageswara Rao	
1966	Palnati Yudham	Telugu	Seelamu Galavari Chinavada	S. Rajeswara Rao	P. Susheela
1966	Palnati Yudham	Telugu	Rati Cheti Rachiluka	S. Rajeswara Rao	P. Susheela
1966	Srikakula Andhra Mahavishnu Katha	Telugu	Vasanta Gaaliki Valapulu Rega	Pendyala Nageswara Rao	S. Janaki
1966	Sadhu Mirandal	Tamil	Arulvaaye Nee Arulvaaye	T. K. Ramamoorthy	
1967	Bhakta Prahlada	Telugu	Aadi Anaadiyu Neeve Deva Narada Sannuta Narayana	S. Rajeswara Rao	S. Janaki
1967	Bhakta Prahlada	Telugu	Siri Siri Laali Chinnari Laali	S. Rajeswara Rao	S. Janaki
1967	Bhakta Prahlada	Telugu	Varamosage Vanamali Naa Vanchitammu Neraverunuga	S. Rajeswara Rao	
1967	Bhakta Prahlada	Tamil	Aadi Anaadiyu Neeye Deva Narada Sannuta Narayana	S. Rajeswara Rao	S. Janaki
1967	Bhakta Prahlada	Tamil	Chinna Chinna Kanne	S. Rajeswara Rao	S. Janaki
1967	Bhakta Prahlada	Tamil	Aadhi Anaadhiyum Neeye	S. Rajeswara Rao	
1967	Gruhalakshmi	Telugu	Madhana Janaka Giridhaari	S. Rajeswara Rao	
1967	Shiva Leelalu	Telugu	Okataipodhama Nedokataiodhama	K. V. Mahadevan & T. Chalapathi Rao	
1968	Kodungallooramma	Malayalam	Kodungallooramme	K. Raghavan	
1968	Kodungallooramma	Malayalam	Kaverippoompattanathil	K. Raghavan	P. Susheela
1968	Pedaraasi Peddamma Katha	Telugu	Siva Manoranjanee Varapaanee	S. P. Kodandapani	
1968	Veeranjaneya	Telugu	Nava Ragame Saagenule	S. Rajeswara Rao	Ghantasala & P. B. Srinivas
1968	Veeranjaneya	Telugu	Rama Nee Namamubayataarakamayya (Padyam)	S. Rajeswara Rao	Ghantasala & P. B. Srinivas
1969	Suba Dhinam	Tamil	Puttham Pudhu Meni	K. V. Mahadevan	P. Susheela
1970	Kann Malar	Tamil	Odhuvaar Un Peyar	K. V. Mahadevan	Soolamangalam Rajalakshmi
1970	Kann Malar	Tamil	Ambalathu Nadaraja	K. V. Mahadevan	S. Janaki
1970	Yamalokapu Gudachari	Telugu	Idhe Jeevitham Velugu Needala Dheepam	V. Siva Reddy	
1971	Pavitra Hrudayalu	Telugu	Karunamaya Sarada	T. Chalapathi Rao	Nookala Chinna Satyanarayana
1971	Sri Venkateswara Vaibhavam	Telugu	Kasturi Tilaka	S. Rajeswara Rao	
1971	Sri Venkateswara Vaibhavam	Telugu	Thera Theeyaraa	S. Rajeswara Rao	
1973	Andala Ramudu	Telugu	Paluke Banagamayera Andala Rama	K. V. Mahadevan	Madhavapeddi Satyam & J. V. Raghavulu
1973	Andala Ramudu	Telugu	Sri Shankara	K. V. Mahadevan	
1975	Hamsageethe	Kannada		M. Balamuralikrishna	
1975	Muthyala Muggu	Telugu	Srirama Jayarama Seetarama	K. V. Mahadevan & Sajjad Hussain	
1975	Muthyala Muggu	Telugu	Sri Raghavam Dasharadhathmaja Maprameyam	K. V. Mahadevan & Sajjad Hussain	
1975	Sri Ramanjaneya Yuddham	Telugu	Meluko Srirama Meluko Raghurama	K. V. Mahadevan	P. Leela
1975	Sri Ramanjaneya Yuddham	Telugu	Karunalola Narayana Sritajanapala Deenavana	K. V. Mahadevan	
1975	Sri Ramanjaneya Yuddham	Telugu	Kshmame Kadha	K. V. Mahadevan	
1976	Dharma Nirnayam	Telugu	Sirasa Nahi Nahire	M. Janardhan	
1976	Iddaru Iddare	Telugu	Amlana Pushp Sankeernam (Slokam)	K. Chakravarthy	
1977	Kurukshetram	Telugu	Kuppinchi Egasina Kundalambula Kanthi (Padyam)	S. Rajeswara Rao	
1977	Kavikkuyil	Tamil	Chinna Kannan Azhaikkiraan	Ilaiyaraaja	
1977	Kavikkuyil	Tamil	Aayiram Kodi	Ilaiyaraaja	
1977	Muthyala Pallaki	Telugu	Thillana	Satyam	S. Janaki
1977	Navarathinam	Tamil	Kuruvikkara Machane	Kunnakudi Vaidyanathan	Vani Jairam
1977	Navarathinam	Tamil	Palukku Kanda Sa Kerugu	Kunnakudi Vaidyanathan	Vani Jairam
1977	Poojakkedukkatha Pookkal	Malayalam	Kannante Kavilil Nin	K. Raghavan	
1977	Poojakkedukkatha Pookkal	Malayalam	Nabhassil Mukilinte	K. Raghavan	
1977	Poojakkedukkatha Pookkal	Malayalam	Saarasaaksha Paripaalayamaamayi	K. Raghavan	
1977	Suprabadham	Tamil	Vada Thisaiyil	M. S. Viswanathan	Vani Jairam
1977	Uyarnthavargal	Tamil	Raman Neeye	Shankar–Ganesh	
1978	Sati Savitri	Telugu	Sri Karamulie	Ghantasala & Pendyala Nageswara Rao	
1978	Sati Savitri	Telugu	Lalithe Sivasaroopya (Slokam)	Ghantasala & Pendyala Nageswara Rao	
1979	Guppedu Manasu	Telugu	Mauname Nee Bhasha O Mooga Manasa	M. S. Viswanathan	
1979	Nool Veli	Tamil	Mounathil Vilayadum	M. S. Viswanathan	
1979	Sri Madvirata Parvam	Telugu	Jeevithame Krishna Sangeetamu	S. Dakshinamurthi	
1979	Sri Madvirata Parvam	Telugu	Aadave Hamsagamana	S. Dakshinamurthi	
1981	Deiva Thirumanangal	Tamil	Thangam Vairam	K. V. Mahadevan, M. S. Viswanathan & G. K. Venkatesh	Vani Jairam
1982	Ekalavya	Telugu	Pradhamamuna	K. V. Mahadevan	
1982	Ekalavya	Telugu	Sarva Jeevula	K. V. Mahadevan	
1982	Ekalavya	Telugu	Yaakundedu	K. V. Mahadevan	
1982	Ente Mohangal Poovaninju	Malayalam	Chakkini Raaja	V. Dakshinamoorthy	S. Janaki
1982	Ente Mohangal Poovaninju	Malayalam	Manasuna Neekai Maruthogo... Raghuvaranum	V. Dakshinamoorthy	K. J. Yesudas & S. Janaki
1982	Mantralaya Raghavendra Vaibhavam	Telugu	Chuthamu Randi Kalyanam Yennadu	Chitti Babu	
1982	Mantralaya Raghavendra Vaibhavam	Telugu	Karuna Deepam Veligenu Manishiki	Chitti Babu	
1982	Meghasandesam	Telugu	Paadana Vani Kalyaniga	Ramesh Naidu	
1982	Thaai Mookaambikai	Tamil	Thaaye Moogambikaiye	Ilaiyaraaja	M. S. Viswanathan, Seerkazhi Govindarajan & S. Janaki
1983	Adi Shankaracharya	Sanskrit		M. Balamuralikrishna	
1983	Kaman Pandigai	Tamil	Kalai Nilaa Aadinaal	Shankar–Ganesh	
1983	Miruthanga Chakravarthi	Tamil	Idhu ketka thigatttatha Gaanam	M. S. Viswanathan	
1986	Madhvacharya	Kannada		M. Balamuralikrishna	
1986	Mahasakthi Mariamman	Tamil	Magarandham Paaloorum	K. V. Mahadevan	
1986	Mahasakthi Mariamman	Tamil	Thhayaai Irukkum	K. V. Mahadevan	
1986	Isai Paadum Thendral	Tamil	Raghuvara Ninnu	Ilaiyaraaja	K. J. Yesudas & S. Janaki
1986	Sree Narayana Guru	Malayalam	Udaya Kunkumam	G. Devarajan	
1986	Sree Narayana Guru	Malayalam	Mizhimuna Kondu	G. Devarajan	
1987	Swathi Thirunal	Malayalam	Moksha Mukalada	M. B. Sreenivasan	
1987	Swathi Thirunal	Malayalam	Pannakendra Sayana	M. B. Sreenivasan	K. J. Yesudas & Neyyattinkara Vasudevan
1987	Swathi Thirunal	Malayalam	Jamuna Kinaare	M. B. Sreenivasan	
1987	Swathi Thirunal	Malayalam	Bhaja Bhaja Manasa	M. B. Sreenivasan	
1987	Swathi Thirunal	Malayalam	Entharo	M. B. Sreenivasan	
1989	Thalaivanukkor Thalaivi	Tamil	Kelvi Rendu	M. Balamuralikrishna	
1990	Ankitham	Telugu	Sangeetha Ganga Tharangalalo	Yuvaraj	S. P. Balasubrahmanyam
1990	Muthina Haara	Kannada	Devaru Hoseda Premada Daara	Hamsalekha	K. S. Chithra
1991	Bharatham	Malayalam	"Raajamathangi" ("Dhwani prasadham")	Raveendran	K. J. Yesudas & K. S. Chithra
1993	Bhagvad Gita	Sanskrit		M. Balamuralikrishna	
1994	Indhu	Tamil	Nagumo	Deva	
1997	Priyamaina Srivaaru	Telugu	Jatakalu Kalisevela Jeevitalu Mugisaayi	Vandemataram Srinivas	
2009	Pasanga	Tamil	Anbaley Azhgagum Veedu	James Vasanthan	Sivaangi Krishnakumar
2015	Prabha	Tamil	Poove Pesum Poove	S. J. Jananiy	

==== Television songs ====
Year	Series	Language	Song	Music director	Co-singer	Notes
2003	Sahana	Tamil	"Aanma Endralum"	Rajesh Vaidhya	Sudha Raghunathan	Also appeared in cameo in one of the episodes

=== Composer ===
Year	Film	Language	Notes
1983	Adi Shankaracharya	Kannada	
1986	Madhavacharya	Kannada	
1989	Thalaivanukkoru Thalaivi	Tamil	
1993	Bhagavad Gita	Sanskrit	
1997	Thodu	Telugu	
