= List of composers who created ragas =

The following is a list of composers of Carnatic and Hindustani music, subgenres of Indian classical music, who have created ragas.

Composer	Genre	Raga Created	Remarks	Ref
Goddess Parvati		Malkauns	Its believed that this raga was created by goddess Parvati to calm lord Shiva	
Lord Shiva		Deepak	This raga believed to be created by Lord Shiva and there is a myth that singing it creates fire. Tansen sang this raga in court of Akbar	
Swami Haridas	Hindustani music	Brindavani Sarang	It is believed Swami Haridas brought Lord Krishna to earth by singing this raga who took the form of an idol which can still be seen in Mathura	
Tana Riri	Hindustani music	Malhar	Twin sisters became renowned as the only singers who were able to cure Tansen in whole India by singing Raag Malhar	
Tansen	Hindustani music	Megh Malhar		
Tansen	Hindustani music	Miyan ki Malhar	Tansen created this raga to bring rain	
Tansen	Hindustani music	Gaud Malhar		
Bilas Khan	Hindustani music	Bilaskhani Todi		
M. Balamuralikrishna	Carnatic music	Mahati	Balamuralikrishna created this raga in four notes	
M. Balamuralikrishna	Carnatic music	Lavangi	Balamuralikrishna created this raga in four notes	
M. Balamuralikrishna	Carnatic music	Ganapati	Balamuralikrishna created this raga using three notes	
Tyagaraja	Carnatic music	Vivardhani	Saint Tyagaraja invented two ragas both ragas with four swaras in the arohana and have six swaras in the avarohana	
Tyagaraja	Carnatic music	Navarasa Kanada	Saint Tyagaraja invented two ragas both ragas with four swaras in the arohana and have six swaras in the avarohana	
Mahesh Mahadev	Carnatic music & Hindustani music	Sri Tyagaraja	Mahesh Mahadev created this raga and named after saint 'Tyagaraja'	
Mahesh Mahadev	Hindustani music	Amritha Kalyani		
Mahesh Mahadev	Hindustani music	Nada Kalyani		
Mahesh Mahadev	Hindustani music	Mukthipradayini		
Mahesh Mahadev	Carnatic music & Hindustani music	Rajasadhaka	Raga named after Indian scientist Y. S. Rajan	
Mahesh Mahadev	Carnatic music & Hindustani music	Binduroopini		
Mahesh Mahadev	Carnatic music	Sri Jnanakshija	Mahesh Mahadev created "Sri Jnanakshija" raga which is named after goddess Jnanakshi Rajarajeshwari, Janya raga of the 21st Melakarta raga Keeravani.	
Mahesh Mahadev		Neelanjana	Mahesh Mahadev created "Neelanjana" raga named after Lord Shani. A Janya raga of the 50th Melakarta, Namanarayani in Carnatic music	
Mahesh Mahadev		Kamakhyapriya	Mahesh Mahadev created "Kamakhyapriya" raga which is named after goddess Kamakhya Janya raga of the 20st Melakarta raga Natabhairavi.	
Mahesh Mahadev	Carnatic music & Hindustani music	Samya	Mahesh Mahadev created this Raga on Chaitra Purnima day, named after Lord Chitragupta, Samya is a raga attributed to justice and fairness, ensuring impartial judgment of individual deeds.	
Mahesh Mahadev	Carnatic music & Hindustani music	Mayurapriya		
Mahesh Mahadev	Carnatic music & Hindustani music	Thyagaraja Mangalam	Mahesh Mahadev created this raga and named after carnatic musician T. M. Thyagarajan	
Mahesh Mahadev	Carnatic music & Hindustani music	Tapaswi		
Mahesh Mahadev	Carnatic music & Hindustani music	Ekamukha		
Mahesh Mahadev	Carnatic music & Hindustani music	Srirangapriya	Mahesh Mahadev created this raga and composed kirtana with Graha bedam with Ahir Bhairav raga written by Yogi Nareyana sung by S. P. Balasubrahmanym	
Mahesh Mahadev	Carnatic music & Hindustani music	Srijanani		
Mahesh Mahadev	Carnatic music & Hindustani music	Hameer Tarang		
Mahesh Mahadev	Carnatic music & Hindustani music	Shivakanthi		
Mahesh Mahadev	Carnatic music & Hindustani music	Ekamukha		
Mahesh Mahadev	Carnatic music & Hindustani music	Rudraranjani		
Mahesh Mahadev	Carnatic music & Hindustani music	Lalithavarali		
Mahesh Mahadev	Carnatic music & Hindustani music	Mayakara		
Mahesh Mahadev	Hindustani music	Bhimsen	Mahesh Mahadev created this raga and named after ‘Bharat Ratna’ Pandit Bhimsen Joshi (BHIM) Miaya Tansen (SEN)	
Mahesh Mahadev	Carnatic music & Hindustani music	Pranava		
Mahesh Mahadev	Carnatic music & Hindustani music	Naagadhaari		
Mahesh Mahadev	Carnatic music & Hindustani music	Thrinayani		
Muthuswami Dikshitar	Carnatic music	Amritavarshini	Muthuswami Dikshitar brought rain at Ettayapuram, Tamil Nadu, India by singing his composition in this raga, "Aanandaamrutakarshini amrutavarshini".	
Muthuswami Dikshitar	Carnatic music	Udayaravichandrika		
Ramaswami Dikshitar	Carnatic music	Hamsadhvani	This raga was created by Ramaswami Dikshitar (1735–1817), father of Muthuswami Dikshitar.	
Shyama Shastri	Carnatic music	Chintamani	Shyama Shastri created this raga and composed 'Devi Brova Samayamide' Kriti in Telugu	
Lalmani Misra	Hindustani music	Madhu Bhairava		
Jayachaamarajendra Wadiyar	Carnatic music	Jayasamvardini		
Maharaja Swathi Thirunal	Carnatic music	Saranganatta		
Maharaja Swathi Thirunal	Carnatic music	Lalita Panchamam		
Maharaja Swathi Thirunal	Carnatic music	Dvijavanti		
Maharaja Swathi Thirunal	Carnatic music	Gopika Vasantam		
Maharaja Swathi Thirunal	Carnatic music	Mohana Kalyani		
Ravi Shankar	Hindustani music	Shyam Bihag		
Ravi Shankar	Hindustani music	Baleshwari		
Ravi Shankar	Hindustani music	Jog Todi		
Ravi Shankar	Hindustani music	Ahir Lalit		
Ravi Shankar	Hindustani music	Rasiya		
Ravi Shankar	Hindustani music	Yaman Manjh		
Ravi Shankar	Hindustani music	Gunji Kanhara		
Ravi Shankar	Hindustani music	Tilak Shyam		
Ravi Shankar	Hindustani music	Rasiya		
Ravi Shankar	Hindustani music	Banjara		
Ravi Shankar	Hindustani music	Suvarna		
Ravi Shankar	Hindustani music	Piloo Banjara		
Ravi Shankar	Hindustani music	Doga Kalyan		
Ravi Shankar	Hindustani music	Nanda Dhwani		
Ravi Shankar	Hindustani music	Natacharuka	Created for his daughter Anoushka	
Ravi Shankar	Hindustani music	Janasanmodini		
Ravi Shankar	Hindustani music	Bairagi		
Ilayaraja	Carnatic music	Panchamukhi		
Ravana		Khamboji	Created to praise lord shiva	
Mysore Manjunath	Carnatic music	Yaduveer Manohari	Named after Yaduveer Krishnadatta Chamaraja Wadiyar	
Sadananda Mukhopadhyaya	Hindustani Music	Daiva Malhar		

== See also ==
- List of rāgas in Indian classical music
