= Nagasvaravali =

Janya raga of Carnatic music

- Arohanam: S G₃ M₁ P D₂ Ṡ
- Avarohanam: Ṡ D₂ P M₁ G₃ S

Nāgasvarāvaḻi, is a rāgam in Carnatic music (musical scale of South Indian classical music). It is an audava rāgam (or owdava, meaning pentatonic scale). It is a janya rāgam (derived scale), as it does not have all the seven swaras (musical notes).

== Structure and Lakshana ==
Nāgasvarāvaḻi scale with shadjam at C

Nāgasvarāvaḻi is a symmetric rāgam that does not contain rishabham or nishādam. It is a pentatonic scale (audava-audava ragam in Carnatic music classification - audava meaning 'of 5'). Its ārohaṇa-avarohaṇa structure (ascending and descending scale) is as follows (see swaras in Carnatic music for details on below notation and terms):

- ārohaṇa : S G₃ M₁ P D₂ Ṡ (Note: Alternate notations: Hindustani: S G M P D Ṡ; Western: C E F G A C)
- avarohaṇa : Ṡ D₂ P M₁ G₃ S (Note: Alternate notations: Hindustani: Ṡ D P M G S; Western: C A G F E C)

(the notes used in this musical scale are shadjam, antara gandharam, shuddha madhyamam, panchamam, chathusruti dhaivatam)

Nāgasvarāvaḻi is considered a janya rāgam of Harikambhoji, the 28th Melakarta rāgam, though it can be derived from other melakarta rāgams, Chakravakam, Sooryakantam, Shankarabharanam, Vagadheeswari or Shoolini, by dropping both rishabham and nishādam.
