= Mahati =

Janya raga of Carnatic music

- Arohanam: S G₃ P N₂ Ṡ
- Avarohanam: Ṡ N₂ P G₃ S

Mahati It is also written as Mahathi is a rāga in Carnatic music (musical scale of South Indian classical music) created by M. Balamuralikrishna. It is a four notes scale (tetratonic scale). It is classified as a janya of 14th Vakulabharanam, 28th Harikāmbhōji or 34th melakarta rāgam Vagadhishvari in the 72 melakarta rāgam system of Carnatic music.

There is no equivalent raga in Hindustani music and scale in western music.

== Structure and Lakshana ==
same notes as Harikambhoji scale with Shadjam at C

Mahati is an symmetric rāgam does not contain rishabham, madhyamam and dhaivatam in the ascending and descending of the scale. Its ārohaṇa-avarohaṇa structure (ascending and descending scale) is as follows.

- ārohaṇa: S G₃ P N₂ Ṡ (Note: Alternate notations: Hindustani: S G P Ṉ Ṡ; Western: C E G B♭ C)
- avarohaṇa: Ṡ N₂ P G₃ S (Note: Alternate notations: Hindustani: Ṡ Ṉ P G S; Western: C B♭ G E C)

The notes used in this scale are shadjam, antara gandharam, panchamam, kaishiki nishadham in both ascending and descending scale. It is a chaturswara rāgam

== Compositions ==
The music composition available in this rāgam

- Mahaneeya Madhura - composed and sung by M Balamuralikrishna
- Adhisaya Ragam (film) - composed by M S Viswanathan, and sung by K J Yesudas for the 1975 film Apoorva Ragangal
