= Parupalli =

Parupalli (Telugu: పారుపల్లి) is a Telugu surname. Notable people with the surname include:

- Parupalli Ramakrishnayya Pantulu (1883–1951), Indian musician
- Parupalli Kashyap (born 1986), Indian badminton player
