= Rasikapriya =

72nd and last raga in the Melakarta

- Arohanam: S R₃ G₃ M₂ P D₃ N₃ Ṡ
- Avarohanam: Ṡ N₃ D₃ P M₂ G₃ R₃ S

Rasikapriya is a rāgam in Carnatic music (musical scale of South Indian classical music). It is the last (72nd) melakarta rāgam in the 72 melakarta rāgam system of Carnatic music. It is called Rasamanjari in Muthuswami Dikshitar school of Carnatic music.

== Structure and Lakshana ==
Rasikapriya scale with shadjam at C

It is the 6th rāgam in the 12th chakra Aditya. The mnemonic name is Aditya-Sha. The mnemonic phrase is sa ru gu mi pa dhu nu. Its ārohaṇa-avarohaṇa structure (ascending and descending scale) is as follows (see swaras in Carnatic music for details on below notation and terms):

- ārohaṇa: S R₃ G₃ M₂ P D₃ N₃ Ṡ (Note: Alternate notations: Hindustani: S G̱ G M̄ P Ṉ N Ṡ; Western: C D♯ E F♯ G A♯ B C)
- avarohaṇa: Ṡ N₃ D₃ P M₂ G₃ R₃ S (Note: Alternate notations: Hindustani: Ṡ N Ṉ P M̄ G G̱ S; Western: C B A♯ G F♯ E D♯ C)

(the scale uses the notes shatsruthi rishabham, antara gandharam, prati madhyamam, shatsruthi dhaivatham, kakali nishadham)

As it is a melakarta rāgam, by definition it is a sampoorna rāgam (has all seven notes in ascending and descending scale). It is the prati madhyamam equivalent of last suddha madhyamam melakarta, Chalanata, which is the 36th melakarta scale.
