= Amritavarshini =

Janya raga of Carnatic music

- Arohanam: S G₃ M₂ P N₃ Ṡ
- Avarohanam: Ṡ N₃ P M₂ G₃ S

Amr̥tavarṣiṇi is a rāgam in Carnatic music (musical scale of South Indian classical music), created in the early nineteenth century by Muthuswami Dikshitar. It is an audava rāgam (meaning pentatonic scale) in which only five of the seven swaras (musical notes) are used. It is a janya rāgam (derived scale), fairly popular in Carnatic music. There is a belief that Amr̥tavarṣiṇi causes rain ( The name of the rāgam is derived from the Sanskrit words Amrita: meaning Nectar and Varshini: meaning one who causes a shower or rain, and hence the association with rain ), and that the Carnatic composer Muthuswami Dikshitar brought rain at Ettayapuram, Tamil Nadu, India by singing his composition, Aanandaamrutakarshini amrutavarshini.

== Structure and Lakshana ==
Amritavarshini scale with shadjam at C

Amr̥tavarṣiṇi is a rāgam that does not contain rishabham and dhaivatam. It is a symmetric pentatonic scale (audava-audava ragam in Carnatic music classification). Its ārohaṇa-avarohaṇa structure (ascending and descending scale) is as follows (see swaras in Carnatic music for details on below notation and terms):

- ārohaṇa : S G₃ M₂ P N₃ Ṡ (Note: Alternate notations: Hindustani: S G M̄ P N Ṡ; Western: C E F♯ G B C)
- avarohaṇa : Ṡ N₃ P M₂ G₃ S (Note: Alternate notations: Hindustani: Ṡ N P M̄ G S; Western: C B G F♯ E C)

The notes used in this scale are shadjam, antara gandharam, prati madhyamam, panchamam and kakali nishādam)

Amr̥tavarṣiṇi is considered a janya rāgam of Chitrambari, the 66th Melakarta rāgam, although it can be derived from other melakarta rāgams, such as Kalyani, Gamanashrama or Vishwambari, by dropping both rishabham and dhaivatam. There is another scale that has the same name but is less practiced in current performances. This scale is associated with the 39th melakarta Jhalavarali.

Arohanam and Arohanam for Amritavarshini with tambura

== See also ==
- List of film songs based on ragas
