= Carnatic raga =

Melodic framework used in Carnatic music

A Carnatic raga (ರಾಗ, రాగం, ராகம், രാഗം, ରାଗ) refers to ragas used in Carnatic music. It has several components: a primordial sound (nāda), tonal system (swara), pitch (śruti), scale, ornaments (gamaka), and important tones.

== Origins and history ==
=== Carnatic raga classification ===
==== Janaka (Melakarta) ragas and Janya (Upanga) ragas ====
Janaka ragas, or Sampoorna ragas, are parent ragas from which more ragas are derived. As the name suggests, Sampoorna ragas are those in which all seven swaras are present. They are also called Melakarta ragas. These ragas have all seven swaras (notes) in their scales (only one of each swara, Sa, Re, Ga, Ma, Pa, Dha, Ni), following strict ascending and descending scales and are sung in all octaves. Example of melakartha ragas are: Shankarabharanam, Kalyani, Natabhairavi, Chala Nattai, Harikambhoji, Kharaharapriya, Mayamalavagowla, and Chakravakam. Janya ragas are derived from Janaka ragas (Melakarta ragas). They may have more or less than seven notes in their scales, zig-zag (vakra) notes that step up and down, and frequently have asymmetrical scales. Janya ragas are also called Upanga ragas. Examples of Upanga ragas are: Malahari, Mohanam, Begada, Shriragam, Hamsadhvani, Vasanta, Janaranjani, Hindolam, and Todi.

===== 72 Melakartha ragas (Mathematical computation) =====
There are different types of swara sthayis, or note pitches, that lead to the total number of melakartha ragas. These different variations of swaras lead to more than one combination of the musical scale. The different variations in swaras are mentioned below. Using this, it is possible to mathematically ascertain the total number of melakartha ragas.

- Sa (Shadja) - only one
- Ri (Rishabha) - Shuddha, Chathushruthi, and Shatshruti Rishabha in increasing order of pitch
- Ga (Gandhara) - Shuddha, Sadharana, and Antara Gandhara in increasing order of pitch
- Ma (Madhyama) - Shuddha and Prathi Madhyama in increasing order of pitch
- Pa (Panchama) - only one
- Dha (Daivata) - Shuddha, Chatushruti, and Shatshruti Daivata in increasing order of pitch
- Ni (Nishada) - Shuddha, Kaishiki, and Kakali Nishadham in increasing order of pitch

However, there are only some combinations that are allowed. For instance, only Shatshruthi Ri can combine with Antara Gandhara and only Chathushruti Rishabha can combine with Sadharana and Antara Gandhara. Likewise, the same principle holds good for Dha and Ni. If we label these swaras as Sa, Ra, Ri, Ru, Ga, Gi, Gu, Ma, Mi, Pa, Dha, Dhi, Dhu, Na, Ni, Nu.
The total combinations are:
a) 1 Sa X 1 Ra X 3(Ga, Gi, Gu) Ga + 1 Sa X Ru X 2 Ga (Gu, Gi) + 1 Sa X Ri X Gu = 6.
b) Ma, Mi =2
c) 1 Pa X Dha X 3 Ni (Na, Ni, Nu)+ 1 Pa X Dhu X 2 Ni (Nu, Ni)+ 1 Pa X Dhi X Ni =6
Multiplying these 3 combinations we get 72.

The 72 melakartha ragas are arranged in a cycle called katapayadi sutra, named due to the index of the raga; we can get the name of the raga and the exact swara combination. The first 36 melakartha ragas have suddha madhyama, whereas the next 36 ragas have prathi madhyama.

The 72 combinations of melakartha ragas gives rise to a wide variety of musical textures. Any sampurna raga is present in this 72 melakartha cycle. From these 72 melakartha ragas, there are more than a thousand janya ragas that contain more musical notations. While getting to know the details of a raga, it is important to know which sampurna raga the janya raga is derived from in order to know the swara types.

==== Janya ragas ====
Janya ragas are ragas that are derived from Janaka ragas (Melakarta ragas). They may have less than 7 notes in their scales, or have additional notes in them, zig-zag (vakra) notes that step and down, asymmetrical scales, etc. See full list of Janya ragas. E.g. of janya ragas are bilahari and hamsadhwani (derived from shankarabharana), sriranjani and darbar (derived from kharaharapriya) and so on.

==== Vakra ragas ====
Vakra ragas are janya ragas that have swaras arranged in a zigzag manner. For e.g. Raga Sri has the following arohanam and avarohanam : S R M P N S^{.} S^{.} N P M R G R S. Such a raga is called vakra raga.

==== Auḍava rāgas ====
Auḍava rāgas are janya ragas that have exactly five notes in ascending and descending scale (arohana and avarohana). Examples are :
1)Mohanam (S R G P D S^{.} S^{.} D P G R S)
2)Hamsadhwani (S R G P N S^{.} S^{.} N P G R S)

==== Shadava Ragas ====
Shadava rāgas are janya ragas that have exactly six notes in ascending and descending scales.

== Components of Carnatic raga ==
A Carnatic raga has several components - a primordial sound (nāda), tonal system (swara), intervals (shruti), scale, ornaments (gamaka) and important tones (vadi and samvadi).

=== Nāda ===
An aim of composer-performers of the past and present is to realise nāda, however, the sound that is audible to human ears is only a fraction of a primordial sound.

=== Swara ===
The Carnatic tonal system consists of seven basic pitches, expressed by the solfa syllables: Sa (shadja), Ri (rishabha), Ga (gandhara), Ma (madhyama), Pa (panchama), Dha (dhaivata) and Ni (nishadha).

=== Scale ===
A Carnatic raga consists of an ascending and descending scale pattern (known as aarohana and avarohana respectively). Both ascent and descent should have at least five tones, although rarer ragas contain fewer tones. Scales establish rules for all performers to adhere to in melodic performance, and provide a tonal boundary. Typical scale features also act to help listeners identify ragas.

=== Gamaka ===
Gamaka, or ornamentation, is essential in Carnatic raga performance. Gamaka encompasses controlled shaking, articulating, sliding, glottal stops and other vocal or instrumental manipulation.

The swara and scale defines only the skeletal structure of a raga. The handling of Gamaka actually defines the raga.

== Raga in improvisation ==
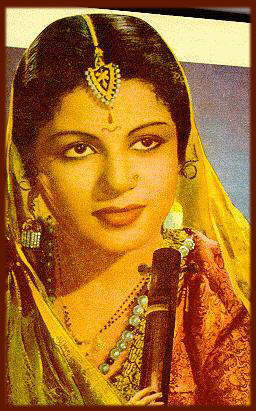
Bharat Ratna M. S. Subbulakshmi, renowned vocalist of Carnatic classical music

=== Types ===
Improvisation in raga is the soul of Indian classical music - an essential aspect. "Manodharma sangeetham" or "kalpana sangeetham" ("music of imagination") as it is known in Carnatic music, embraces several varieties of improvisation.

==== Raga Alapana ====
An alapana, sometimes also called ragam, is the exposition of a raga or tone - a slow improvisation with no rhythm, where the raga acts as the basis of embellishment. In performing alapana, performers consider each raga as an object that has beginnings and endings and consists of sequences of thought.

The performer will explore the ragam and touch on its various nuances, singing in the lower octaves first, then gradually moving up to higher octaves, while giving a hint of the song to be performed.

==== Niraval ====
Niraval, usually performed by more advanced performers, consists of singing one or two lines of a song repeatedly, but with a series of melodic improvised elaborations. The lines are then also played at different levels of speed which can include double, triple, quadruple and even sextuple speed.

==== Kalpanaswaram ====
Kalpanaswaram, also known as swarakalpana, consists of improvising melodic and rhythmic passages using swaras (solfa syllables). Kalpanaswaras are sung to end on a particular swara in the raga of the melody and at a specific place (idam) in the tala cycle. Generally, the swaras are sung to end on the samam (the first beat of the rhythmical cycle), and can be sung at the same speed or double the speed of the melody that is being sung, though some artists sing triple-speed phrases too.

==== Tanam ====
Tanam is one of the most important forms of improvisation, and is integral to Ragam-Tanam-Pallavi. Originally developed for the veena, it consists of expanding the raga with syllables like tha, nam, thom, aa, nom, na, etc.

==== Ragam-Tanam-Pallavi ====
Ragam-Tanam-Pallavi is the principal long form in concerts, and is a composite form of improvisation. As the name suggests, it consists of raga alapana, tanam, and a pallavi line. Set to a slow-paced tala, the pallavi line is often composed by the performer. Through niraval, the performer manipulates the pallavi line in complex melodic and rhythmic ways. The niraval is followed by kalpanaswarams.

=== Learning and performing ===
When learning a raga, it is never enough just to know the basic scale of the raga. Different ragas can sometimes have the same scales. For example, the raga pairs Bhairavi and Manji, Mayamalavagowla and Nadanamakriya, Bilahari and Mand, Shankarabharanam and Kurinji, among others, have exactly the same scale, but are clearly distinct ragas due to the way the notes and musical phrases are rendered. In addition, the scale of the raga often does not offer insight into some of the subtleties of the raga, such as the usage of gamakas, anya swaras, and ragabhavam. This is especially true for heavier ragas like Yadhukula Kambodhi, Thodi, Sahana, Huseni, Varali, etc.

There is similarity between the ragas Darbar and Nayaki. Both are upanga janyas of the 22nd mela Kharaharapriya, and have similar patterns in both their ascending and descending scales. However, the two ragas are distinctly different, especially where the usage of the gandhara and nishada are concerned. When singing Darbar, these swaras are rendered more quickly with gamaka, and more pronounced when jante prayogas are used while descending. On the other hand, these swaras are more elongated in Nayaki, as illustrated in the pallavi of Muttusvami Dikshitar's famous composition, RanganayakamBhavayeham.

The best way to learn a raga and account for all its subtleties, therefore, is to refer to compositions, which often contain a wealth of phrases that lend beauty to the raga. Before an artist attempts to sing a raga, he or she should be familiar with several compositions in that raga. They should have also listened to multiple different renderings of the raga by various artists, in order to get a better sense of how certain phrases can be applied.

== Raga in non-classical traditions ==
=== Raga in Harikatha ===
The Harikatha tradition, which originated in the Indian state of Maharashtra, involves popular storytelling combined with dance and music. Krishna Bhagavathar, an exponent of Carnatic music, is responsible for creating the South Indian harikatha style - singing in raga, dancing with tala, and narrating stories in a manner that sustains the attention of the audience. In effect, Harikatha is an art form that requires knowledge of raga, Carnatic music, dance, speech, diction and dramatic technique. Harikatha performance aims to communicate with non-literate and literate audiences. Ajjada Adibhatla Narayana Das is credited as creator of modern Harikatha format.

Well-known harikatha performers had a broad knowledge of Carnatic music in the early part of the 20th century - some were well established Carnatic musicians, while others were composers. Today, a few performers keep this tradition alive and use ragas from both Carnatic music and Hindustani music traditions.

== Raga Discovery ==
In Indian classical music, ragas are precise and well organised melodic structures which have the capability to evoke distinct moods and emotions. There are multiple attempts of raga creations by Harikesanallur Muthaiah Bhagavathar and others. In the 21st century, Dr. M. Balamuralikrishna has created raga in three notes. Ragas such as Mahathi, Lavangi, Sidhdhi, Sumukham have been created using four notes.

== Raga and light classical music ==
=== Raga in film songs ===
In south Indian cinema, one can find a number of examples where a film song is composed based on a Carnatic raga or song. Ragas such as Mohanam, Shankarabharanam, Kalyani, etc. find their way into multiple film songs.

Here are some excerpts from Telugu cinema:

- Om namashivaya from Sagara Sangamam - Hindolam raga.
- Nada vinodamu from Sagara Sangamam - sriranjini.
- Omkara nadanu Sankarabharanam- sankarabharanam.
- Shivashankari from Jagadeka Veeruni Katha- Darbaari Kaanada.
- Paadana vani kalyaniga from Meghasandesam - Kalyani.

Here are some excerpts from Tamil cinema:

- Adhisaya Ragam from Aboorva Ragangal movie - Mahathi raga.
- Aadatha manamum undo from Manadhi Mannan movie - Lathangi Raga.
- Pon enben from Policekaran magal movie - Darbari Kanada Raga.
- Paatum Naane from Thiruvilaiyadal movie - Gowrimanohari Raga.
- Maname muruganin from Motor sundaram pillai Movie - Hindolam Raga.
- Thenavan Thaainaatu singarame from Tenaliraman movie - Reethi Gowla Raga.
- Isaiketaal puvi from Thavapudhalvan movie - Kalyani Raga.
- Thanga Radham vandhadhu from Kalaikovil movie - Abhogi Raga.
- Sivakami Aadavandhal from Paatum Bharathamum movie - Amritavarshini Raga.
- Nadhamenum Kovilile from Manamadha leelai movie - Sri ranjani Raga.
- Poi vaa magale from Karnan movie - Aananda Bhairavi Raga.
- Kallellam Maanika kallaguma from Alayamani movie - Mayamalavagowla Raga.
- Maadhavi Ponmayilaal from Iru Malargal Movie - Karaharapriya Raga.
- Pon ondru kanden from Padithaal matum podhuma - Brindavana Saranga Raga.
- Aadal Kalaye Deivam Thandhadhu from Raghavendra movie - Charukesi Raga.
- Rukku Rukku from Avvai Shanmukhi - Sahana Raga.
- Kalaivaniye from Sindhu Bhairavi - Kalyani Raga.
- Poomalai Vangi from Sindhu Bhairavi - Kanada Raga.
- Kannodu Kanbadethallam from Jeans - Abheri Raga.
- Sorgame Enralum - Hamsanadam Raga.
- Aaruyire Aaruyire - Charukesi Raga.

In Hindi cinema: Mand Raaga - Tu Chanda main Chandani (Reshma aur Shera)

== See also ==
- List of composers who created ragas
- Carnatic music
- Raga
