= Chalanata =

36th raga in the Melakarta

- Arohanam: S R₃ G₃ M₁ P D₃ N₃ Ṡ
- Avarohanam: Ṡ N₃ D₃ P M₁ G₃ R₃ S

Chalanata (pronounced chalanāta) is a rāgam in Carnatic music (musical scale of South Indian classical music). It is the 36th Melakarta rāgam in the 72 melakarta rāgam system of Carnatic music. It is one of the few rāgams referred by the same name in Muthuswami Dikshitar school of Carnatic music.

== Structure and Lakshana ==
Chalanata scale with Shadjam at C

It is the 6th rāgam in the 6th chakra Rutu. The mnemonic name is Rutu-Sha. The mnemonic phrase is sa ru gu ma pa dhu nu. Its ārohaṇa-avarohaṇa structure (ascending and descending scale) is as follows (see swaras in Carnatic music for details on below notation and terms):

- ārohaṇa: S R₃ G₃ M₁ P D₃ N₃ Ṡ (Note: Alternate notations: Hindustani: S G̱ G M P Ṉ N Ṡ; Western: C D♯ E F G A♯ B C)
- avarohaṇa: Ṡ N₃ D₃ P M₁ G₃ R₃ S (Note: Alternate notations: Hindustani: Ṡ N Ṉ P M G G̱ S; Western: C B A♯ G F E D♯ C)

The notes used in this scale are shadjam, shatsruthi rishabham, antara gandharam, shuddha madhyamam, panchamam, shatsruthi dhaivatham and kakali nishadham. As it is a melakarta rāgam, by definition it is a sampurna rāgam (has all seven notes in ascending and descending scale). It is the shuddha madhyamam equivalent of Rasikapriya, which is the 72nd (last) melakarta.

== Janya Rāgams ==
Chalanāta (also pronounced Chalanāttai) has two popular janya rāgams (derived scales) associated with it, namely Nāta (Nāttai) and Ghambheeranāta (Gambheeranāttai). Nāta ragam compositions are sung often in concerts and it overshadows Chalanāta. See List of Janya Rāgams for list of janya rāgams associated with Chalanāta.
