= Gamanashrama =

53rd raga in the Melakarta

- Arohanam: S R₁ G₃ M₂ P D₂ N₃ Ṡ
- Avarohanam: Ṡ N₃ D₂ P M₂ G₃ R₁ S

Gamanashrama (pronounced gamanāshrama) is a ragam in Carnatic music (musical scale of South Indian classical music). It is the 53rd Melakarta rāgam in the 72 melakarta rāgam system of Carnatic music. This is the Carnatic equivalent of Marva in Hindustani Classical Music.

Gamanashrama is the Prathi Madhyamam equivalent of the 17th Melakarta raga Suryakantam

It is called Gamakakriya in Muthuswami Dikshitar school of Carnatic music.

== Structure and Lakshana ==
Gamanashrama scale with Shadjam at C

It is the 5th rāgam in the 9th chakra Brahma. The mnemonic name is Brahma-Ma. The mnemonic phrase is sa ra gu mi pa dhi nu. Its ārohaṇa-avarohaṇa structure (ascending and descending scale) is as follows (see swaras in Carnatic music for details on below notation and terms):

- ārohaṇa: S R₁ G₃ M₂ P D₂ N₃ Ṡ (Note: Alternate notations: Hindustani: S Ṟ G M̄ P D N Ṡ; Western: C D♭ E F♯ G A B C)
- avarohaṇa: Ṡ N₃ D₂ P M₂ G₃ R₁ S (Note: Alternate notations: Hindustani: Ṡ N D P M̄ G Ṟ S; Western: C B A G F♯ E D♭ C)

The notes used in this scale are shadjam, shuddha rishabham, antara gandharam, prati madhyamam, panchamam, chathusruthi dhaivatham and kakali nishadham. As it is a melakarta rāgam, by definition it is a sampurna rāgam (has all seven notes in ascending and descending scale). It is the prati madhyamam equivalent of Suryakantam, which is the 17th melakarta.
