= Latangi =

63rd raga in the Melakarta

- Arohanam: S R₂ G₃ M₂ P D₁ N₃ Ṡ
- Avarohanam: Ṡ N₃ D₁ P M₂ G₃ R₂ S

Latangi (pronounced latāngi) is a ragam in Carnatic music (musical scale of South Indian classical music). It is the 63rd Melakarta rāgam in the 72 melakarta rāgam system of Carnatic music. It is called Geetapriya or Gitapriya in the Muthuswami Dikshitar school of Carnatic music.

== Structure and Lakshana ==
Latangi scale with shadjam at C

It is the 3rd rāgam in the 11th chakra Rudra. The mnemonic name is Rudra-Go. The mnemonic phrase is sa ri gu mi pa dha nu. Its ārohaṇa-avarohaṇa structure (ascending and descending scale) is as follows (see swaras in Carnatic music for details on below notation and terms):

- ārohaṇa: S R₂ G₃ M₂ P D₁ N₃ Ṡ (Note: Alternate notations: Hindustani: S R G M̄ P Ḏ N Ṡ; Western: C D E F♯ G A♭ B C)
- avarohaṇa: Ṡ N₃ D₁ P M₂ G₃ R₂ S (Note: Alternate notations: Hindustani: Ṡ N Ḏ P M̄ G R S; Western: C B A♭ G F♯ E D C)

(the notes used in this scale are chathusruthi rishabham, antara gandharam, prati madhyamam, shuddha dhaivatham, kakali nishadham)

As it is a melakarta rāgam, by definition it is a sampoorna rāgam (has all seven notes in ascending and descending scale). It is the prati madhyamam equivalent of Sarasangi, which is the 27th melakarta.
