= Amritha Kalyani =

Raga created by Mahesh Mahadev

- Arohanam: S G₃ M₂ P N₃ Ṡ
- Avarohanam: Ṡ N₃ D₂ P M₂ G₃ R₂ S

Amritha Kalyani is a rāga in Carnatic music (musical scale of South Indian classical music) created by music composer Mahesh Mahadev who has created many ragas. It is the Janya raga of 65th melakarta rāgam Mechakalyani in the 72 melakarta rāgam system of Carnatic music.

It is equivalent to Lydian mode of western music but the second and sixth note is omitted in ascending. This rāgam is also named as Amrith Kalyan Hindustani music.

== Structure and Lakshana ==
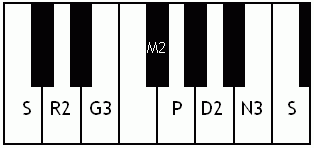
Descending is same as Kalyani scale with Shadjam at C

Amritha Kalyani is an asymmetric rāgam does not contain rishabham and dhaivatam in the ascending scale. It is an audava-sampurna rāgam (or owdava rāgam, meaning pentatonic ascending scale). Its ārohaṇa-avarohaṇa structure (ascending and descending scale) is as follows.

- ārohaṇa: S G₃ M₂ P N₃ Ṡ (Note: Alternate notations: Hindustani: S G M̄ P N Ṡ; Western: C E F♯ G B C)
- avarohaṇa: Ṡ N₃ D₂ P M₂ G₃ R₂ S (Note: Alternate notations: Hindustani: Ṡ N D P M̄ G R S; Western: C B A G F♯ E D C)

The notes used in this scale are shadjam, chatushūruti rishabam, antara gandharam, prati madhyamam, chatushruti dhaivatam, kakali nishadam in the ascending, chatushruti rishabham and chatushruti daivatam added in descending scale. It is a audava - sampurna rāgam

== Compositions ==
The composition in this rāgam

Achyutam Keshavam - composed by Mahesh Mahadev, sung by Priyadarshini

Ragapravaham - Ganesh Kumaresh
