= Gambhiranata =

Janya raga of Carnatic music

- Arohanam: S G₃ M₁ P N₃ Ṡ
- Avarohanam: Ṡ N₃ P M₁ G₃ S

Gambhiranata is a rāga in Carnatic music (musical scale of South Indian classical music) and Yakshagana where it is called Naati. It is an audava rāgam (or owdava rāga, meaning pentatonic scale). It is a janya rāga (derived scale), as it does not have all the seven swaras (musical notes). Gambhiranata is also known as Shuddha Nata.

== Structure and Lakshana ==
Gambhiranata scale with shadjam at C

Gambhiranata is a symmetric rāga that does not contain rishabham or dhaivatam. It is a pentatonic scale (audava-audava ragam in Carnatic music classification – audava meaning 'of 5'). Its ascending and descending scale structure (ārohaṇa-avarohaṇa) is as follows:

- ārohaṇa : S G₃ M₁ P N₃ Ṡ (Note: Alternate notations: Hindustani: S G M P N Ṡ; Western: C E F G B C)
- avarohaṇa : Ṡ N₃ P M₁ G₃ S (Note: Alternate notations: Hindustani: Ṡ N P M G S; Western: C B G F E C)

The notes used in this scale are shadjam, antara gandharam, shuddha madhyamam, panchamam and kakali nishadam (see swaras in Carnatic music for details on below notation and terms). Gambhiranata is considered a janya rāgam of Chalanata, the 36th Melakarta rāgam, though it can be derived from 8 other melakarta rāgams, by dropping both rishabham and dhaivatam.

== Popular compositions ==
Gambhiranata rāgam lends itself for elaboration due to the pentatonic nature and symmetricity of the scale. The mallari tune played in Nadhaswaram at temple processions are set to this musical scale.
