= Natakapriya =

Tenth raga in the Melakarta

- Arohanam: S R₁ G₂ M₁ P D₂ N₂ Ṡ
- Avarohanam: Ṡ N₂ D₂ P M₁ G₂ R₁ S
- Equivalent: Dorian ♭2 scale

Natakapriya, (pronounced nāţakapriya, meaning the one dear to theatre) is a rāgam in Carnatic music (musical scale of South Indian classical music). It is the 10th melakarta rāgam (parent scale) in the 72 melakarta rāgam system. According to the Muthuswami Dikshitar school, the 10th melakarta rāgam is called Naţābharanam.

== Structure and Lakshana ==
Natakapriya scale with shadjam at C

It is a sampoorna rāgam - rāgam having all 7 swarams. It is the 4th rāgam in the 2nd chakra Netra. The mnemonic name is Netra-Bhu. The mnemonic phrase is sa ra gi ma pa dhi ni. Its ārohaṇa-avarohaṇa structure (ascending and descending scale) is as follows (see swaras in Carnatic music for details on below notation and terms):

- ārohaṇa : S R₁ G₂ M₁ P D₂ N₂ Ṡ (Note: Alternate notations: Hindustani: S Ṟ G̱ M P D Ṉ Ṡ; Western: C D♭ E♭ F G A B♭ C)
- avarohaṇa : Ṡ N₂ D₂ P M₁ G₂ R₁ S (Note: Alternate notations: Hindustani: Ṡ Ṉ D P M G̱ Ṟ S; Western: C B♭ A G F E♭ D♭ C)

The notes used in this scale are shuddha rishabham, sadharana gandharam, shuddha madhyamam, chathusruthi dhaivatham and kaisiki nishadham. Natakapriya is the shuddha madhyamam equivalent of Shadvidamargini, which is the 46th melakarta rāgam.

== Asampurna Melakarta ==
Naţābharanam is the 10th Melakarta in the original list compiled by Venkatamakhin. The notes used in the scale are the same, but the scales are vakra (zig-zag usage in phrases of the scale). It is an shadava-sampurna raga (6 notes in ascending scale, while full 7 are used in descending scale).

- ārohaṇa: S G₂ M₁ P N₂ D₂ N₂ Ṡ (Note: Alternate notations: Hindustani: S G̱ M P Ṉ D Ṉ Ṡ; Western: C E♭ F G B♭ A B♭ C)
- avarohaṇa: Ṡ N₂ D₂ N₂ P N₂ P M₁ G₂ G₂ R₁ R₁ S (Note: Alternate notations: Hindustani: Ṡ Ṉ D Ṉ P Ṉ P M G̱ G̱ Ṟ Ṟ S; Western: C B♭ A B♭ G B♭ G F E♭ E♭ D♭ D♭ C)
