= Ganapati (raga) =

Janya raga of Carnatic music

- Mela: Kanakangi
- Arohanam: S G₁ P Ṡ
- Avarohanam: Ṡ P G₁ S

Ganapati also written as Ganapathi is a rāgam in Carnatic music (musical scale of South Indian classical music) created by M. Balamuralikrishna with only three notes and Introduced to Carnatic music with a composition 'Gam Ganapathim'. It is a janya rāga (derived scale) of the 7th Melakarta rāgam Senavati.

== Scale ==
The Ganapati raga contains three notes in ascending and descending of the scale:

- Arohana : S G₂ P Ṡ (Note: Alternate notations: Hindustani: S G̱ P Ṡ; Western: C E♭ G C)
- Avarohana : Ṡ P G₂ S (Note: Alternate notations: Hindustani: Ṡ P G̱ S; Western: C G E♭ C)

== Compositions ==
Composition	Language	Talam	Composer	Singer	Lyrics	Audio Label	Ref
Gam Ganapathim	Sanskrit	Adi	M Balamurali Krishna	M Balamurali Krishna	M Balamurali Krishna	Geetanjali	
