= Lavangi (scale) =

Janya raga of Carnatic music

- Mela: Hanumatodi
- Arohanam: S R₁ M₁ D₁ Ṡ
- Avarohanam: Ṡ D₁ M₁ R₁ S

Lavangi is a rāgam (musical scale) of Carnatic music (South Indian classical music).

It is a janya rāgam (derived scale) of the 8th Melakarta rāgam Hanumatodi. M. Balamuralikrishna is credited with introducing it into Carnatic music and using this scale first for compositions. His most popular kriti in this ragam is 'Omkaaraakarini'.

== Scale ==
The Lavangi scale contains four swarams:

- Arohana : S R₁ M₁ D₁ Ṡ (Note: Alternate notations: Hindustani: S Ṟ M Ḏ Ṡ; Western: C D♭ F A♭ C)
- Avarohana : Ṡ D₁ M₁ R₁ S (Note: Alternate notations: Hindustani: Ṡ Ḏ M Ṟ S; Western: C A♭ F D♭ C)

== Origin ==
The ragam Lavangi is derived from the Sanskrit words 'Lava' (beautiful) and 'Anga' (parts), and means "one with beautiful parts". M. Balamuralikrishna built the raga to have 4 swaras, excluding the low sadharna as it is generic.

== Compositions ==
Composition	Language	Talam	Composer	Singer	Lyrics	Audio Label
Omkaarakarini	Sanskrit	Adi	M Balamurali Krishna	M Balamurali Krishna	M Balamurali Krishna	Living Media India Limited
Sakala Grahabalanene	Kannada	Khanda Chapu	Purandara Dasa	Priyadarshini	Purandara Dasa	PM Audios

== Film Songs ==
=== Language:Tamil ===
Song	Movie	Composer	Singer
Kangalukul Unnai	Thanthu Vitten Ennai	Ilaiyaraaja	S. Janaki
