= Nada Kalyani =

Raga created by Mahesh Mahadev

- Arohanam: S R₂ M₂ P N₃ Ṡ
- Avarohanam: Ṡ N₃ D₂ P M₂ G₃ R₂ S

Nada Kalyani is a rāga in Carnatic music(musical scale of South Indian classical music) created by music composer Mahesh Mahadev who has created many ragas in classical music. Nada Kalyani is the Janya raga of 65th melakarta rāgam Mechakalyani in the 72 melakarta rāgam system of Carnatic music.

It is equivalent to Lydian mode of western music but the third and sixth note is omitted in ascending. This rāgam is named as Nada Kalyan in Hindustani music.

== Structure and Lakshana ==
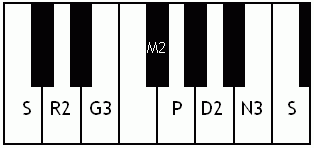
Descending is same as Kalyani scale with Shadjam at C

Nada Kalyani is an asymmetric rāgam does not contain gandharam and dhaivatam in the ascending scale. It is an audava-sampurna rāgam (or owdava rāgam, meaning pentatonic ascending scale). The structure ārohaṇa-avarohaṇa of this raga as follows.

- ārohaṇa: S R₂ M₂ P N₃ Ṡ (Note: Alternate notations: Hindustani: S R M̄ P N Ṡ; Western: C D F♯ G B C)
- avarohaṇa: Ṡ N₃ D₂ P M₂ G₃ R₂ S (Note: Alternate notations: Hindustani: Ṡ N D P M̄ G R S; Western: C B A G F♯ E D C)

The notes used in this scale are shadjam, chatushūruti rishabam, prati madhyamam, panchamam, kakali nishadam in the ascending, antara gandharam and chatushruti daivatam added in descending scale. It is a audava - sampurna rāgam

== Compositions ==
The composition in this rāgam

Achyutam Keshavam — composed by Mahesh Mahadev and sung by Priyadarshini
