= Sankaraguptam =

- village
- Interactive map of Sankaraguptam
- Coordinates: 16.39°N 81.85°E
- Country: India
- State: Andhra Pradesh
- District: Dr. B.R. Ambedkar Konaseema

Government
  - Type: Local self
  - Body: Panchayat

Population (2011)
  - Total: 11,528

Languages
  - Official: Telugu
- Time zone: UTC+5:30 (IST)
- PIN: 533250
- Lok Sabha constituency: Amalapuram
- Vidhan Sabha constituency: Razole

Sankaraguptam is a village in Malikipuram Mandal of Dr. B.R. Ambedkar Konaseema district, Andhra Pradesh, India. It is located in the delta region of Godavari known as Konaseema. Coconut, rice, and casuarina are the major crops grown. This is also the birth village of the legendary Carnatic musician M. Balamuralikrishna.

== Etymology ==
The name is said to be derived when Sankara hid here to protect himself from Bhashmasura who was blessed with boon by Lord Sankara that the head on which he places his palm would be burnt into ashes). Sankara refers to Lord Shiva and guptam is a secret, the place where Lord Shiva hid to protect himself from Bhasmasura.

== Demographics ==
According to Indian census, 2001 and 2011, the demographic details of this village are as follows:

	2001 census	2011 census
Total population	10,768	11,528
Sex ratio (Note: Females per 1000 males)	1,004	976
Literacy	70.04%	77.79%
Children under 6	1,329	990
Households	2,608	2,929
