= Suryakantam =

Seventeenth raga in the Melakarta

- Arohanam: S R₁ G₃ M₁ P D₂ N₃ Ṡ
- Avarohanam: Ṡ N₃ D₂ P M₁ G₃ R₁ S

Suryakantam or Sooryakantam (pronounced sūryakāntam) is a rāgam in Carnatic music (musical scale of South Indian classical music). It is the 17th melakarta rāgam (parent scale) in the 72 melakarta rāgam system of Carnatic music. It is called Chāyāvati in Muthuswami Dikshitar school of Carnatic music.

== Structure and Lakshana ==
Suryakantam scale with shadjam at C

It is the 5th rāgam in the 3rd chakra Agni. The mnemonic name is Agni-Ma. The mnemonic phrase is sa ra gu ma pa dhi nu. Its ārohaṇa-avarohaṇa structure (ascending and descending scale) is as follows (see swaras in Carnatic music for details on below notation and terms):

- ārohaṇa: S R₁ G₃ M₁ P D₂ N₃ Ṡ (Note: Alternate notations: Hindustani: S Ṟ G M P D N Ṡ; Western: C D♭ E F G A B C)
- avarohaṇa: Ṡ N₃ D₂ P M₁ G₃ R₁ S (Note: Alternate notations: Hindustani: Ṡ N D P M G Ṟ S; Western: C B A G F E D♭ C)

This scale uses the swaras, shuddha rishabham, antara gandharam, shuddha madhyamam, chathusruthi dhaivatham and kakali nishadham. As it is a melakarta rāgam, by definition it is a sampoorṇa rāgam (has all seven notes in ascending and descending scale). It is the shuddha madhyamam equivalent of Gamanashrama, which is the 53rd melakarta scale.

== Asampurna Melakarta ==
Chāyāvati is the 17th Melakarta in the original list compiled by Venkatamakhin. The notes used in the scale are the same, but the actual ascending scale is different, where-in the panchamam is not used.

- ārohaṇa: S R₁ G₃ M₁ D₂ N₃ Ṡ (Note: Alternate notations: Hindustani: S Ṟ G M D N Ṡ; Western: C D♭ E F A B C)
- avarohaṇa: Ṡ N₃ D₂ P M₁ G₃ R₁ S (Note: Alternate notations: Hindustani: Ṡ N D P M G Ṟ S; Western: C B A G F E D♭ C)

== Janya rāgams ==
Suryakantam has many janya rāgams (derived scales) associated with it, of which Vasanta, Sowrashtram and Bhairavam are popular in concerts. See List of janya rāgams for those associated with Suryakantam.

== Related rāgams ==
This section covers the theoretical and scientific aspect of this rāgam.

Suryakantam's notes when shifted using Graha bhedam, yields 2 melakarta rāgams, namely Senavati and Latangi. Graha bhedam is the step taken in keeping the relative note frequencies same, while shifting the shadjam to the next note in the rāgam. For further details and an illustration refer Graha bhedam on Suryakantam.
