= Parupalli Ramakrishnayya Pantulu =

Gayaka Sarvabhauma Śri Parupalli Ramakrishnayya Pantulu
- Born: Parupalli Ramakrishnayya Pantulu
- Origin: Parupalli, Guntur district, Madras Presidency, British India
- Genre: Carnatic music
- Occupation: vocalist of indian classical music
- Instrument: vocals
- Years active: 1883–1951

Parupalli Ramakrishnayya Pantulu (1883–1951) was a Carnatic vocalist. He is better known as a Guru producing maestros like M. Balamuralikrishna and many more renowned musicians.

Sri Pantulu was a direct descendant of the śishya parampara of Saint Thyagaraja. In the order of Guru Parampara, the musician is directly the fourth in the line of disciples of saint Tyagaraja, after Susarla Dakshinamoorthy Sastry, Akumadugula Manambuchavadi Venkata Subbayya and Saint Tyagaraja.

Born on 15 December 1882 to Smt. Mangamma and Sri . Seshachalam at Village Srikakulam, Andhra Pradesh, Sri. Pantulu garu (Garu – an honorific title). After formal education and upanayanam (formal coming-of-age ceremony), took up the job of Thanedar - a village law enforcement official in the principality of Challapalli in the Krishna district of Andhra Pradesh
