= Sarasangi =

27th raga in the Melakarta

- Arohanam: S R₂ G₃ M₁ P D₁ N₃ Ṡ
- Avarohanam: Ṡ N₃ D₁ P M₁ G₃ R₂ S
- Equivalent: Harmonic major scale

Sarasangi (pronounced sarasāngi) is a ragam in Carnatic music (musical scale of South Indian classical music). It is the 27th melakarta rāgam (parent scale) in the 72 melakarta rāgam system of Carnatic music. It is called Sowrasena in Muthuswami Dikshitar school of Carnatic music. In Western music it is known as the Harmonic major scale.

== Structure and Lakshana ==
Sarasangi scale with shadjam at C

It is the 3rd rāgam in the 5th chakra Bana. The mnemonic name is Bana-Go. The mnemonic phrase is sa ri gu ma pa dha ni. Its ārohaṇa-avarohaṇa structure (ascending and descending scale) is as follows (see swaras in Carnatic music for details on below notation and terms):

- ārohaṇa: S R₂ G₃ M₁ P D₁ N₃ Ṡ (Note: Alternate notations: Hindustani: S R G M P Ḏ N Ṡ; Western: C D E F G A♭ B C)
- avarohaṇa: Ṡ N₃ D₁ P M₁ G₃ R₂ S (Note: Alternate notations: Hindustani: Ṡ N Ḏ P M G R S; Western: C B A♭ G F E D C)

This rāgam uses the swaras chathusruthi rishabham, antara gandharam, shuddha madhyamam, shuddha dhaivatham and kakali nishadham.

By definition, Sarasangi, a melakarta rāgam, is a sampurna rāgam (has all seven notes in ascending and descending scale). It is the shuddha madhyamam equivalent of Latangi, which is the 63rd melakarta scale.
