= Kalyani (raga) =

Musical scale (raga) in Carnatic music

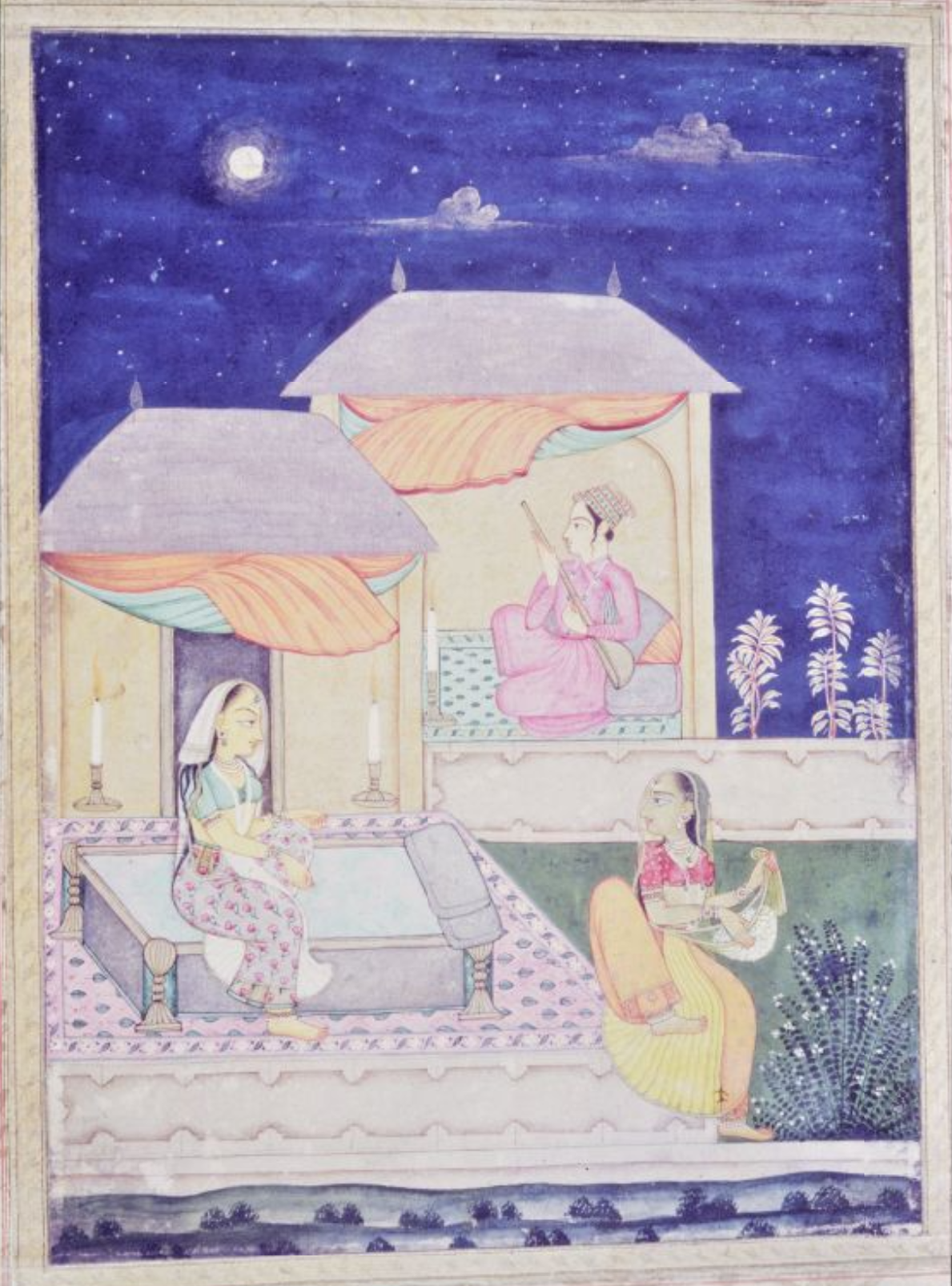
- Arohanam: S R₂ G₃ M₂ P D₂ N₃ Ṡ
- Avarohanam: Ṡ N₃ D₂ P M₂ G₃ R₂ S
- Equivalent: Lydian mode

Kalyani is a melakarta ragam (parent musical scale) in the Carnatic music. It is the prati madhyama equivalent of the raga Sankarabharanam. It was called Kalyan but is now more popularly called Yaman in Hindustani Music. Its Western equivalent is the Lydian mode.

== Kalyani in Carnatic music ==
In South Indian weddings it is a very prominently played ragam. The word Kalyani means she who causes auspicious things. It is the 65th melakarta ragam under the Katapayadi sankhya. It is also called Mechakalyani. The notes for Kalyani are S R_{2} G_{3} M_{2} P D_{2} N_{3}. Kalyani is the first Prathi Madhyama raga that was ever discovered. It was obtained by the process of Graha Bhedam or modal shift of tonic of the ancient Shadja Grama.

=== Specifics on this raga ===
Kalyani has scope for elaborate alapana. One should not remain too long on panchamam (pa) or alternate between shadjamam and panchamam too frequently. Kalyani is prominently known among the public. It is often performed at the beginning of concerts because it is considered auspicious.

=== Structure and lakshana ===
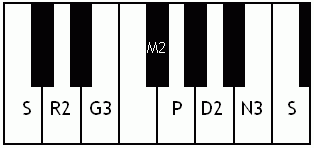
Kalyani scale with Shadjam at C

It is the 5th ragam in the 11th chakra Rudra. The mnemonic name is Rudra-Ma. The mnemonic phrase is sa ri gu mi pa dhi (or 'di') nu. Its arohana-avarohana structure is as follows (see swaras in Carnatic music for details on below notation and terms):

- arohana: S R₂ G₃ M₂ P D₂ N₃ Ṡ (Note: Alternate notations: Hindustani: S R G M̄ P D N Ṡ; Western: C D E F♯ G A B C)
- avarohana: Ṡ N₃ D₂ P M₂ G₃ R₂ S (Note: Alternate notations: Hindustani: Ṡ N D P M̄ G R S; Western: C B A G F♯ E D C)

The notes used in this scale are shadjam, chatushūruti rishabam, antara gandharam, prati madhyamam, panchamam, chatushruti dhaivatam, kakali nishadam. It is a Sampurna raga in Carnatic music, that is to say, has all the seven notes: Sa, Ri, Ga, Ma, Pa, Dha, Ni. It is the prati madhyamam equivalent of Sankarabharanam, which is the 29th melakarta. This raga is very significant to the chart, because it is sung with all higher notes.

=== Janya ragams ===
Kalyani has many janya ragams (derived scales)associated with it, of which Hamir Kalyani, Mohanakalyani, Amritha Kalyani, Saranga, Nada Kalyani, Sunadavinodini and Yamunakalyani are very popular. See List of Janya Ragams for full list of rāgams associated with Kalyani.

== Film songs ==
The most popular film composition set in Kalyani is "Mannavan Vandhanadi Thozhi" by K. V. Mahadevan rendered by P. Susheela.

== Historical information ==
Yaman/Aiman is not an ancient raga. It is first mentioned in the literature in the late 16th century, by which time it was very popular: The Sahasras contains 45 dhrupad song-texts for Kalyan and five for Iman-Kalyan. According to Venkatamakhin (1620), Kalyan was a favourite melody to the Arabs, and Pundarika included Yaman among his 'Persian' Ragas.

== Literature ==
Bor, Joep (1997), The Raga Guide, Charlottesville, Virginia: Nimbus Records
Kaufmann, Walter (1968), The Ragas of North India, Calcutta: Oxford and IBH Publishing Company.
Bagchee, Sandeep (1998), Nād, Understanding Rāga Music, Mumbai: Eshwar (Business Publications Inc.).
Bhatt, Balvantray (1964–1974), Bhāvaranga, Varanasi: Motilal Barnasidas.
Gandharva, Kumar (1965), Anūparāgavilāsa, Bombay: Mauj Prakashan.
Patwardhan, Vinayak Rao (1961–74), Rāga Vijñāna, Poona: Sangeet Gaurav Granthamala.
Srivastava, Harichandra (1973–79), Rāga Paricaya, Allahabad: SangeetSadan Prakashan.
Telang, Gokulanand; Bhartendu, Banwari Lal (1962), Sangīta Rāga Aṣṭachāpa, Hathras: Sangeet Karyalaya.
Thakar, Vasant Vaman, Sangīta Rāga Darśana, Prayag: Gandharva Mahavidyalaya Mandal Prakashan.
Rao, B. Subba (1964–66), Raganidhi, Madras: Music Academy.
