= Vagadheeswari =

34th raga in the Melakarta

- Arohanam: S R₃ G₃ M₁ P D₂ N₂ Ṡ
- Avarohanam: Ṡ N₂ D₂ P M₁ G₃ R₃ S

Vagadheeswari (pronounced vāgadheeśwari) is a rāgam in Carnatic music (musical scale of South Indian classical music). It is the 34th melakarta rāgam (parent scale) in the 72 melakarta rāgam system of Carnatic music. It is called Bhogachhāyānāţa in Muthuswami Dikshitar school of Carnatic music.

== Structure and Lakshana ==
Vagadheeshwari scale with shadjam at C

It is the 4th rāgam in the 6th chakra Rutu. The mnemonic name is Rutu-Bhu. The mnemonic phrase is sa ru gu ma pa dhi ni. Its ārohaṇa-avarohaṇa structure (ascending and descending scale) is as follows (see swaras in Carnatic music for details on below notation and terms):

- ārohaṇa: S R₃ G₃ M₁ P D₂ N₂ Ṡ (Note: Alternate notations: Hindustani: S G̱ G M P D Ṉ Ṡ; Western: C D♯ E F G A B♭ C)
- avarohaṇa: Ṡ N₂ D₂ P M₁ G₃ R₃ S (Note: Alternate notations: Hindustani: Ṡ Ṉ D P M G G̱ S; Western: C B♭ A G F E D♯ C)

The swaras shatsruthi rishabham, antara gandharam, shuddha madhyamam, chathusruthi dhaivatham and kaisiki nishadham are used in this scale. As Vagadheeshwari is a melakarta rāgam, by definition it is a sampoorna rāgam (has all seven notes in ascending and descending scale). It is the shuddha madhyamam equivalent of Nasikabhooshani, which is the 70th melakarta scale.
