= Raga =

Melodic mode of improvisation in Indian music

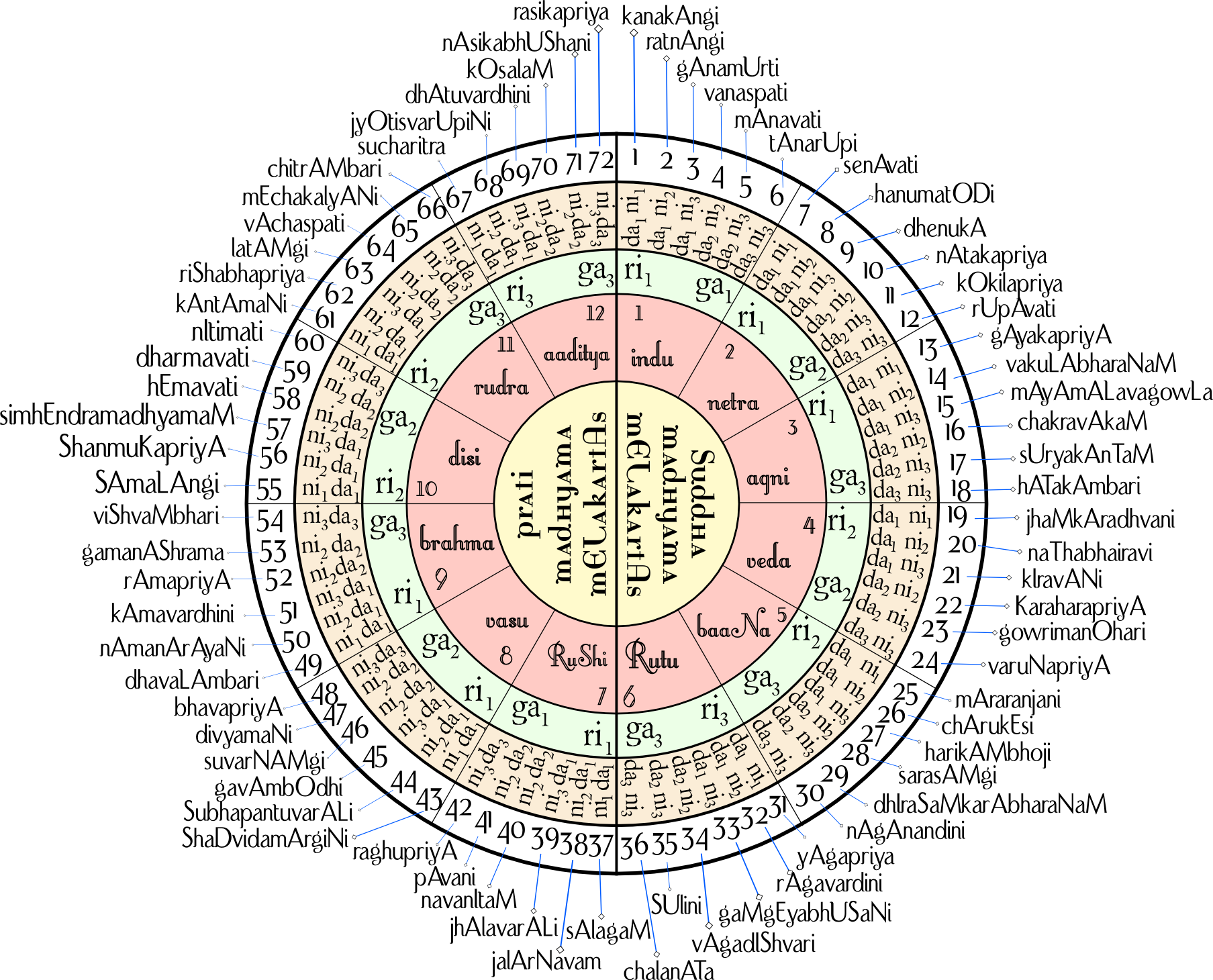
Melakarta ragas of Carnatic music. While ragas in Hindustani music are divided into thaats, ragas in Carnatic music are divided into melakartas.

A raga (Note: Also ragam, rāg (in modern Hindustani), or its feminine counterpart ragini.) (Note: The word rāga is derived from the Sanskrit verb रञ्ज् IAST: rañj 'to dye' or 'to colour' – itself inherited from the Proto-Indo-European root *reg- 'to dye'.) (/ˈrɑːɡə/ RAH-gə; IAST: rāga, Sanskrit: [ɾäːɡɐ]; lit. 'colouring', 'tingeing' or 'dyeing') is a melodic framework for improvisation in Indian classical music akin to a melodic mode. It is central to classical Indian music. Each raga consists of an array of melodic structures with musical motifs; and, from the perspective of the Indian tradition, the resulting music has the ability to "colour the mind" as it engages the emotions of the audience.

Each raga provides the musician with a musical framework within which to improvise. Improvisation by the musician involves creating sequences of notes allowed by the raga in keeping with rules specific to the raga. Ragas may change over time, with an example being Marwa, the primary development of which has been going down into the lower octave, in contrast with the traditional middle octave. Each raga traditionally has an emotional significance and symbolic associations such as with season, time and mood. Ragas are considered a means in the Indian musical tradition for evoking specific feelings in listeners. Hundreds of ragas are recognized in the classical tradition, of which about 30 are common, and each raga has its "own unique melodic personality".

There are two main classical music traditions, Hindustani (North Indian) and Carnatic (South Indian), and the concept of raga is shared by both. Raga is also found in Sikh traditions such as in Guru Granth Sahib, the primary scripture of Sikhism. Similarly, it is a part of the qawwali tradition in Sufi Islamic communities of South Asia. Some popular Indian film songs and ghazals use ragas in their composition.

Every raga has a svara (a note or named pitch) called shadja, or adhara sadja, whose pitch may be chosen arbitrarily by the performer. This is taken to mark the beginning and end of the saptak (loosely, octave). The raga also contains an adhista, which is either the svara Ma or the svara Pa. The adhista divides the octave into two parts or anga – the purvanga, which contains lower notes, and the uttaranga, which contains higher notes. Every raga has a vadi and a samvadi. The vadi is the most prominent svara, which means that an improvising musician emphasizes or pays more attention to the vadi than to other notes. The samvadi is consonant with the vadi (always from the anga that does not contain the vadi) and is the second most prominent svara in the raga.

== Terminology ==
The Sanskrit word rāga (Sanskrit: राग) has Indian roots, as the Indo-European root *reg- connotes 'to dye'. Cognates are found in Greek, Persian, Khwarezmian, Kurdish. The words "red" and "rado" are also related. According to Monier Monier-Williams, the term comes from a Sanskrit word for "the act of colouring or dyeing", or simply a "colour, hue, tint, dye". The term also connotes an emotional state referring to a "feeling, affection, desire, interest, joy or delight", particularly related to passion, love, or sympathy for a subject or something. In the context of ancient Indian music, the term refers to a harmonious note, melody, formula, building block of music available to a musician to construct a state of experience in the audience.

The word appears in the ancient Principal Upanishads of Hinduism, as well as the Bhagavad Gita. For example, verse 3.5 of the Maitri Upanishad and verse 2.2.9 of the Mundaka Upanishad contain the word rāga. The Mundaka Upanishad uses it in its discussion of soul (Atman-Brahman) and matter (Prakriti), with the sense that the soul does not "colour, dye, stain, tint" the matter. The Maitri Upanishad uses the term in the sense of "passion, inner quality, psychological state". The term rāga is also found in ancient texts of Buddhism where it connotes "passion, sensuality, lust, desire" for pleasurable experiences as one of three impurities of a character. Alternatively, rāga is used in Buddhist texts in the sense of "color, dye, hue".

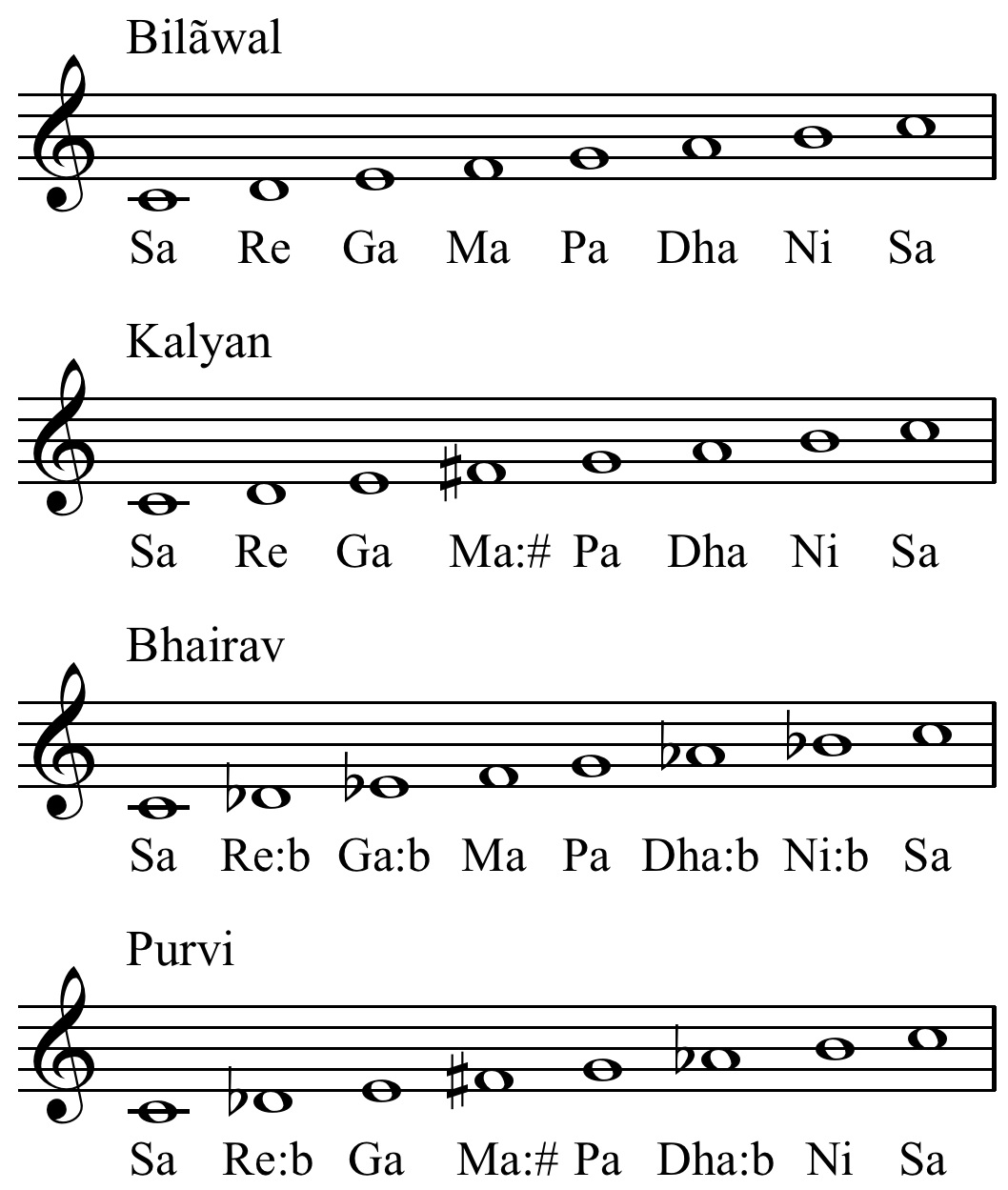

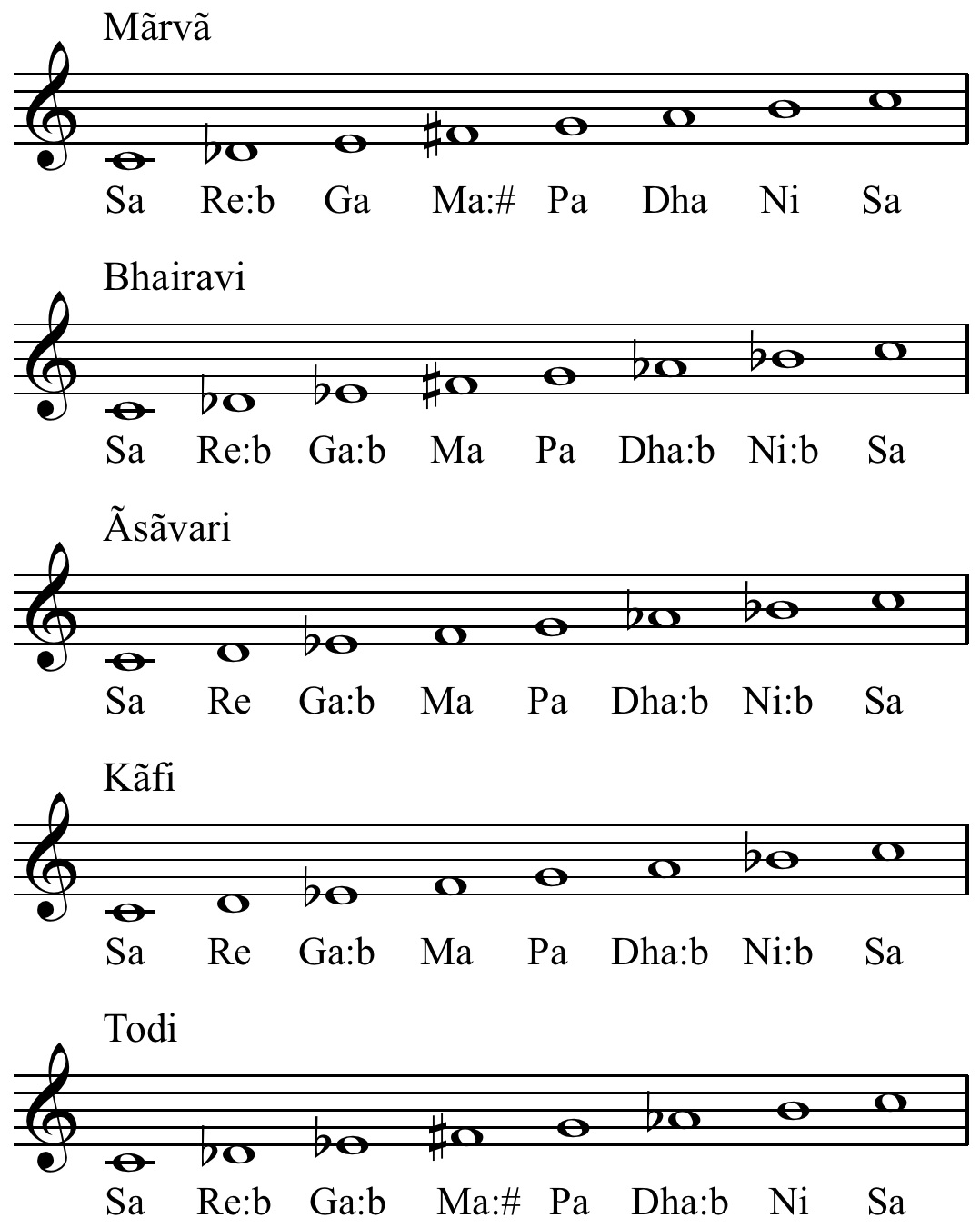
Raga groups are called thaat.

The term rāga in the modern connotation of a melodic format occurs in the Brihaddeshi by Mataṅga Muni dated c. 8th century, or possibly 9th century. The Brihaddeshi describes rāga as "a combination of tones which, with beautiful illuminating graces, pleases the people in general".

According to Emmie te Nijenhuis, a professor in Indian musicology, the Dattilam section of Brihaddeshi has survived into the modern times, but the details of ancient music scholars mentioned in the extant text suggest a more established tradition by the time this text was composed. The same essential idea and prototypical framework is found in ancient Hindu texts, such as the Naradiyasiksa and the classic Sanskrit work Natya Shastra by Bharata Muni, whose chronology has been estimated to sometime between 500 BCE and 500 CE, probably between 200 BCE and 200 CE.

Bharata describes a series of empirical experiments he did with the Veena, then compared what he heard, noting the relationship of fifth intervals as a function of intentionally induced change to the instrument's tuning. Bharata states that certain combinations of notes are pleasant, and certain others are not so. His methods of experimenting with the instrument triggered further work by ancient Indian scholars, leading to the development of successive permutations, as well as theories of musical note inter-relationships, interlocking scales and how this makes the listener feel. Bharata discusses Bhairava, Kaushika, Hindola, Dipaka, SrI-rāga, and Megha. Bharata states that these can to trigger a certain affection and the ability to "color the emotional state" in the audience. His encyclopedic Natya Shastra links his studies on music to the performance arts, and it has been influential in Indian performance arts tradition.

The other ancient text, Naradiyasiksa dated to be from the 1st century BCE, discusses secular and religious music, compares the respective musical notes. This is earliest known text that reverentially names each musical note to be a deity, describing it in terms of varna ('colours') and other motifs such as parts of fingers, an approach that is conceptually similar to the 12th century Guidonian hand in European music. The study that mathematically arranges rhythms and modes (rāga) has been called prastāra ('matrix').(Khan 1996, p. 89, Quote: "… the Sanskrit word prastāra, … means mathematical arrangement of rhythms and modes. In the Indian system of music there are about the 500 modes and 300 different rhythms which are used in everyday music. The modes are called Ragas.")

In the ancient texts of Hinduism, the term for the technical mode part of rāga was jati. Later, jati evolved to mean quantitative class of scales, while rāga evolved to become a more sophisticated concept that included the experience of the audience. A figurative sense of the word as 'passion, love, desire, delight' is also found in the Mahabharata. The specialized sense of 'loveliness, beauty', especially of voice or song, emerges in classical Sanskrit, used by Kalidasa and in the Panchatantra.

== History and significance ==
Indian classical music has ancient roots and developed to serve both spiritual (moksha) and entertainment (kama) purposes. Conceptions of sound can be traced back to the Vedic period. Sound is thought to carry a metaphysical power, thus the memorisation of Vedic texts also required precise intonation.

Raga, along with performance arts such as dance and music, has long been an integral part of Hinduism. Most Hindus do not regard music as merely entertainment but as a spiritual practice and path to moksha (liberation). In this tradition, ragas are believed to have an inherent natural existence that is discovered rather than invented by artists. Music resonates with human beings because it reflects the hidden harmonies of the ultimate creation. Ancient texts such as the Sama Veda (~1000 BCE), which also arranges the Rigveda to melodic patterns, are entirely structured according to melodic themes. The ragas were envisioned by the Hindus as a manifestation of the divine, with each musical note treated as a god or goddess with complex personality.

During the Bhakti movement of Hinduism, which dates to about the middle of 1st millennium CE, ragas became an integral part of the musical expression of spirituality. Bhajan and kirtan were composed and performed by the early pioneers in South India. A bhajan is a free-form devotional composition based on melodic rāgas. A kirtan, on the other hand, is a more structured team performance, typically with a call and response musical structure, resembling an intimate conversation. It includes two or more musical instruments, and incorporates various ragas such as those associated with Hindu gods like Shiva (Bhairav) or Krishna (Hindola).

The early 13th century Sanskrit text Sangitaratnakara, by Sarngadeva patronized by King Sighana of the Yadava dynasty in the North-Central Deccan region (today a part of Maharashtra), mentions and discusses 253 ragas. This is one of the most comprehensive surviving historic treatises on the structure, technique, and reasoning behind ragas.

The tradition of incorporating rāga into spiritual music is also found in Jainism and in Sikhism. In the Sikh scripture, the texts are set to specific raga and are sung according to the rules of that raga. According to Pashaura Singh, a professor of Sikh and Punjabi studies, the rāga and tāla of ancient Indian traditions were carefully selected and integrated by the Sikh Gurus into their hymns. They also picked from the "standard instruments used in Hindu musical traditions" for singing kirtans in Sikhism.

During the Islamic rule period of the Indian subcontinent, particularly in and after the 15th century, the mystical Islamic tradition of Sufism developed devotional songs and music called qawwali. It incorporated elements of rāga and tāla.

The Buddha discouraged music intended for entertainment among monks seeking higher spiritual attainment, but instead encouraged chanting of sacred hymns. The various canonical Tripitaka texts of Buddhism, for example, outline the Dasha-shila or ten precepts for those following the Buddhist monastic order. Among these is the precept advising monks to "abstain from dancing, singing, music and worldly spectacles". Buddhism does not forbid music or dance for Buddhist lay followers, but its emphasis has been on chants rather than on musical raga.

== Description ==
A raga is sometimes explained as a melodic rule set that a musician works with, but according to Dorottya Fabian and others, this is now generally accepted among music scholars to be an explanation that is too simplistic. According to them, a raga of the ancient Indian tradition can be compared to the concept of non-constructible set in language for human communication, in a manner described by Frederik Kortlandt and George van Driem; audiences familiar with raga recognize and evaluate performances of them intuitively.

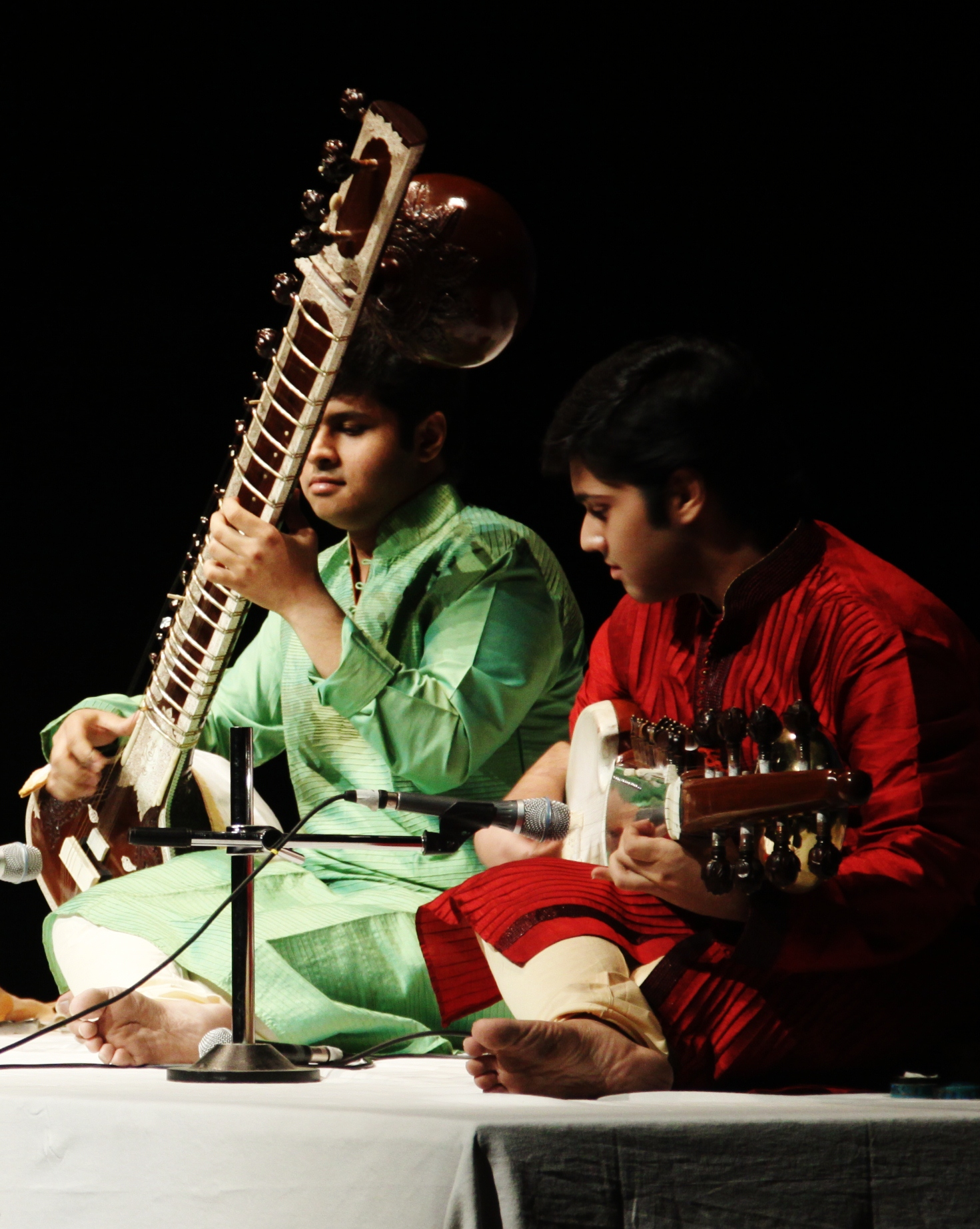
Two Indian musicians performing a rāga duet called Jugalbandi

The attempt to appreciate, understand and explain rāga among European scholars started in the early colonial period. In 1784, Jones translated it as "mode" of European music tradition, but Willard corrected him in 1834 with the statement that a raga is both modet and tune. In 1933, states José Luiz Martinez – a professor of music, Stern refined this explanation to "the raga is more fixed than mode, less fixed than the melody, beyond the mode and short of melody, and richer both than a given mode or a given melody; it is mode with added multiple specialities".

The raga is a central concept of Indian music, predominant in its expression, yet the concept has no direct Western translation. According to Walter Kaufmann, though a remarkable and prominent feature of Indian music, a definition of rāga cannot be offered in one or two sentences. A raga is a fusion of technical and ideational ideas found in music, and may be roughly described as a musical entity that includes note intonation, relative duration and order, in a manner similar to how words flexibly form phrases to create an atmosphere of expression. In some cases, certain rules are considered obligatory, in others optional. The raga allows flexibility, where the artist may rely on simple expression, or may add ornamentations yet express the same essential message but evoke a different intensity of mood.

A raga has a given set of notes, on a scale, ordered in melodies with musical motifs. A musician playing a raga, states Bruno Nettl, may traditionally use just these notes but is free to emphasize or improvise certain degrees of the scale. The Indian tradition suggests a certain sequencing of how the musician moves from note to note for each raga, in order for the performance to create a rasa ('mood, atmosphere, essence, inner feeling') that is unique to each raga. A raga can be written on a scale. Theoretically, thousands of ragas are possibly given five or more notes, but in practical use, the classical tradition has refined and typically relies on several hundred. For most artists, their basic perfected repertoire has some forty to fifty ragas. Ragas in Indian classical music is intimately related to tala or guidance about "division of time", with each unit called a matra ('beat; mora').

A raga is not a tune because the same raga can yield an infinite number of tunes. A defining feature of many ragas is the pakad (also called chalan), a characteristic melodic phrase or pattern that helps establish the raga's identity during performance. Even when two ragas share the same scale, differences in their characteristic phrases and treatment of notes enable experienced listeners to distinguish between them. A raga is not a scale, because many ragas can be based on the same scale. A raga, according to Bruno Nettl and other music scholars, is a concept similar to a mode, something between the domains of tune and scale, and it is best conceptualized as a "unique array of melodic features, mapped to and organized for a unique aesthetic sentiment in the listener". The goal of a raga and its artist is to create rasa with music, as classical Indian dance does with performance arts. In the Indian tradition, classical dances are performed with music set to various ragas.

Joep Bor of the Rotterdam Conservatory of Music defined rāga as a "tonal framework for composition and improvisation." Nazir Jairazbhoy, chairman of UCLA's department of ethnomusicology, characterized ragas as separated by scale, line of ascent and descent, transilience, emphasized notes and register, and intonation and ornaments.

=== Raga-Ragini system ===
Rāginī (रागिनी) is a term for the "feminine" counterpart of a "masculine" rāga. These are envisioned to parallel the god-goddess themes in Hinduism, and described variously by different medieval Indian music scholars. For example, the Sangita-darpana text of 15th-century Damodara Misra proposes six ragas with thirty ragini, creating a system of thirty six, a system that became popular in Rajasthan. In the north Himalayan regions such as Himachal Pradesh, the music scholars such as 16th century Mesakarna expanded this system to include eight descendants to each raga, thereby creating a system of eighty four. After the 16th-century, the system expanded still further.

In Sangita-darpana, the Bhairava raga is associated with the following raginis: Bhairavi, Punyaki, Bilawali, Aslekhi, Bangali. In the Meskarna system, the masculine and feminine musical notes are combined to produce putra ragas called Harakh, Pancham, Disakh, Bangal, Madhu, Madhava, Lalit, Bilawal.

This system is no longer in use today because the 'related' ragas had very little or no similarity and the raga-ragini classification did not agree with various other schemes.

=== Ragas and their symbolism ===
The North Indian raga system is also called Hindustani, while the South Indian system is commonly referred to as Carnatic. The North Indian system suggests a particular time of a day or a season, in the belief that the human state of psyche and mind are affected by the seasons and by daily biological cycles and nature's rhythms. The South Indian system is closer to the text, and places less emphasis on time or season.

The symbolic role of classical music through raga has been both aesthetic indulgence and the spiritual purifying of one's mind (yoga). The former is encouraged in Kama literature (such as Kamasutra), while the latter appears in Yoga literature with concepts such as "Nada-Brahman" (metaphysical Brahman of sound). Hindola raga, for example, is considered a manifestation of Kama (god of love), typically through Krishna. Hindola is also linked to the festival of dola, which is more commonly known as "spring festival of colors" or Holi. This idea of aesthetic symbolism has also been expressed in Hindu temple reliefs and carvings, as well as painting collections such as the ragamala.

In ancient and medieval Indian literature, the raga are described as manifestation and symbolism for gods and goddesses. Music is discussed as equivalent to the ritual yajna sacrifice, with pentatonic and hexatonic notes such as "ni-dha-pa-ma-ga-ri" as Agnistoma, "ri-ni-dha-pa-ma-ga as Asvamedha, and so on.

During the Middle Ages, music scholars of India began associating each raga with seasons. The 11th-century Nanyadeva, for example, recommends that Hindola raga is best in spring, Pañcama in summer, Sadjagrama and Takka during the monsoons, Bhinnasadja in early winter, and Kaisika in late winter. In the 13th century, Sarngadeva went further and associated raga with rhythms of each day and night. He associated pure and simple ragas to early morning, mixed and more complex ragas to late morning, skillful ragas to noon, love-themed and passionate ragas to evening, and universal ragasl to night.

=== Raga and Yoga Sutras ===
In the Yoga Sutras II.7, rāga is defined as the desire for pleasure based on remembering past experiences of pleasure. Memory triggers the wish to repeat those experiences, leading to attachment. Ego is seen as the root of this attachment, and memory is necessary for attachment to form. Even when not consciously remembered, past impressions can unconsciously draw the mind toward objects of pleasure.

=== Raga and mathematics ===
According to Cris Forster, mathematical studies on systematizing and analyzing South Indian raga began in the 16th century. Computational studies of rāgas is an active area of musicology.

== Notations ==
Although notes are an important part of raga practice, they alone do not make the raga. A raga is more than a scale, and many ragas share the same scale. The underlying scale may have four, five, six or seven tones, called svaras. The svara concept is found in the ancient Natya Shastra in Chapter 28. It calls the unit of tonal measurement or audible unit as Śruti, with verse 28.21 introducing the musical scale as follows,

तत्र स्वराः –
षड्‍जश्‍च ऋषभश्‍चैव गान्धारो मध्यमस्तथा ।
पञ्‍चमो धैवतश्‍चैव सप्तमोऽथ निषादवान् ॥ २१॥

— Natya Shastra, 28.21

These seven degrees are shared by both major rāga system, that is the North Indian (Hindustani) and South Indian (Carnatic). The solfege (sargam) is learnt in abbreviated form: sa, ri (Carnatic) or re (Hindustani), ga, ma, pa, dha, ni, sa. Of these, the first that is "sa", and the fifth that is "pa", are considered anchors that are unalterable, while the remaining have flavors that differs between the two major systems.

Svara in North Indian system of Rāga
| Svara (Long) | Sadja (षड्ज) | Rishabha (ऋषभ) | Gandhara (गान्धार) | Madhyama (मध्यम) | Pañcham (पञ्चम) | Dhaivata (धैवत) | Nishada (निषाद) |
| Svara (Short) | Sa (सा) | Re (रे) | Ga (ग) | Ma (म) | Pa (प) | Dha (ध) | Ni (नि) |
| 12 Varieties (names) | C (sadja) | D♭ (komal re), D (suddha re) | E♭ (komal ga), E (suddha ga) | F (suddha ma), F♯ (tivra ma) | G (pañcama) | A♭ (komal dha), A (suddha dha) | B♭ (komal ni), B (suddha ni) |

Svara in South Indian system of rāga
| Svara (Long) | Shadjam (षड्ज) | Risabham (ऋषभ) | Gandharam (गान्धार) | Madhyamam (मध्यम) | Pañcamam (पञ्चम) | Dhaivatam (धैवत) | Nishadam (निषाद) |
| Svara (Short) | Sa (सा) | Ri (री) | Ga (ग) | Ma (म) | Pa (प) | Dha (ध) | Ni (नि) |
| 16 Varieties (names) | C (sadja) | D♭ (suddha ri), D♯ (satsruti ri), D♮ (catussruti ri) | E♭ (sadarana ga), E (suddha ga), E♮ (antara ga) | F♯ (prati ma), F♮ (suddha ma) | G (pañcama) | A♭ (suddha dha), A♯ (satsruti dha), A♮ (catussruti dha) | B♭ (kaisiki ni), B (suddha ni), B♮ (kakali ni) |

The music theory in the Natyashastra, states Maurice Winternitz, centers around three themes – sound, rhythm and prosody applied to musical texts. The text asserts that the octave has 22 srutis or micro-intervals of musical tones or 1,200 cents. Ancient Greek system is also very close to it, states Emmie te Nijenhuis, with the difference that each sruti computes to 54.5 cents, while the Greek enharmonic quarter-tone system computes to 55 cents. The text discusses gramas (scales) and murchanas (modes), mentioning three scales of seven modes (21 total), some Greek modes are also like them . However, the Gandhara-grama is just mentioned in Natyashastra, while its discussion largely focuses on two scales, fourteen modes and eight four tanas (notes). The text also discusses which scales are best for different forms of performance arts.

These musical elements are organized into scales (mela), and the South Indian raga system works with 72 scales, as first discussed by Caturdandi prakashika. They are divided into two groups, purvanga and uttaranga, depending on the nature of the lower tetrachord. The anga itself has six cycles (cakra), where the purvanga or lower tetrachord is anchored, while there are six permutations of uttaranga suggested to the artist. After this system was developed, the Indian classical music scholars have developed additional ragas for all the scales. The North Indian style is closer to the Western diatonic modes, and built upon the foundation developed by Vishnu Narayan Bhatkhande using ten Thaat: kalyan, bilaval, khamaj, kafi, asavari, bhairavi, bhairav, purvi, marva and todi. Some ragas are common to both systems and have same names, such as kalyan performed by either is recognizably the same. Some ragas are common to both systems but have different names, such as malkos of Hindustani system is recognizably the same as hindolam of Carnatic system. However, some rāgas are named the same in the two systems, but they are different, such as todi.

Recently, a 32 thaat system was presented in a book Nai Vaigyanik Paddhati to correct the classification of North Indian-style ragas.

Ragas containing four svaras are called surtara (सुरतर; 'tetratonic') ragas; those with five svaras are called audava (औडव; 'pentatonic') ragas; those with six are called shādava (षाडव; hextonic'); and those with seven are called sampurna (संपूर्ण; 'complete, heptatonic'). The number of svaras may differ in the ascending and descending like the Bhimpalasi raga, which has five notes in the ascending and seven notes in descending or Khamaj with six notes in the ascending and seven in the descending. Ragas differ in their ascending or descending movements. Those that do not follow the strict ascending or descending order of svaras are called vakra (वक्र; 'crooked') ragas.

== Carnatic raga ==
In Carnatic music, the principal ragas are called Melakarthas, which literally means "lord of the scale". It is also called Asraya raga—meaning 'shelter-giving raga', or Janaka raga—meaning 'father raga'.

A thaata in the South Indian tradition are groups of derivative rāgas, which are called Janya ('begotten') ragas or Asrita ('sheltered)' ragas. However, these terms are approximate and interim phrases during learning, as the relationships between the two layers are neither fixed nor has unique parent-child relationship.

Janaka ragas are grouped together using a scheme called Katapayadi sutra and are organised as Melakarta ragas. A Melakarta raga is one which has all seven notes in both the ārōhanam ('ascending scale') and avarōhanam ('descending scale'). Some Melakarta ragas are Harikambhoji, Kalyani, Kharaharapriya, Mayamalavagowla, Sankarabharanam, and Hanumatodi. Janya ragas are derived from Janaka ragas, using a combination of the swarams (usually a subset of swarams) from the parent raga. Some janya ragas are Abheri, Abhogi, Bhairavi, Hindolam, Mohanam and Kambhoji.

In the 21st century, few composers have discovered new ragas. Dr. M. Balamuralikrishna who has created raga in three notes Ragas such as Mahathi, Lavangi, Sidhdhi, Sumukham that he created have only four notes.

A list of janaka ragas would include Kanakangi, Ratnangi, Ganamurthi, Vanaspathi, Manavathi, Thanarupi, Senavathi, Hanumatodi, Dhenuka, Natakapriya, Kokilapriya, Rupavati, Gayakapriya, Vakulabharanam, Mayamalavagowla, Chakravakam, Suryakantam, Hatakambari, Jhankaradhvani, Natabhairavi, Keeravani, Kharaharapriya, Gourimanohari, Varunapriya, Mararanjani, Charukesi, Sarasangi, Harikambhoji, Sankarabharanam, Naganandini, Yagapriya, Ragavardhini, Gangeyabhushani, Vagadheeswari, Shulini, Chalanata, Salagam, Jalarnavam, Jhalavarali, Navaneetam, Pavani.

== Training ==
Classical music has been transmitted through music schools or through Guru–Shishya parampara ('teacher–student tradition') through an oral tradition and practice. Some are known as gharana (houses), and their performances are staged through sabhas (music organizations). Each gharana has freely improvised over time, and differences in the rendering of each raga is discernible. In the Indian musical schooling tradition, the small group of students lived near or with the teacher, the teacher treated them as family members providing food and boarding, and a student learnt various aspects of music thereby continuing the musical knowledge of their guru. The tradition survives in parts of India, and many musicians can trace their guru lineage.

== Persian râk ==
The music concept of râk or rang ('colour') in Persian is probably a pronunciation of rāga. According to Hormoz Farhat, it is unclear how this term came to Persia, as it has no meaning in the modern Persian language and the concept of rāga is unknown in Persia.

== See also ==
- List of ragas in Indian classical music
- List of composers who created ragas
- Carnatic raga
  - List of Janya ragas
  - List of Melakarta ragas
- Prahar
- Samayā
- Rasa (aesthetics)
- Raga, a documentary about the life and music of Ravi Shankar
- Raga rock
- Arabic maqam
- Persian dastgah
