= Chembai discography =

This is a listing of the commercially published recordings of Chembai Vaidyanatha Bhagavatar (1895–1974).

== Gurusmarana ==
Chembai Vaidyanatha Bhagavatar and K.J.Yesudas - Live concert
Violin: M.S.Gopalakrishnan
Mridangam: T.V.Gopalakrishnan
Ghatam: Alangudi Ramachandran
Venue: Chembai Parthasarathy Swami Temple, Palghat
Label: BMG Crescendo/Tharangini

Kriti	Raga	Tala	Composer
Viriboni (Varnam)	Bhairavi	Ata	Pacchimiriam Adiyappa
Vathapi Ganapathim	Hamsadhwani	Adi	Muthuswami Dikshitar
Pavana Guru	Hamsanandi	Adi	Lalita Dasar
Ksheera Sagara	Devagandhari	Adi	Thyagaraja
Siva Siva Siva	Panthuvarali	Adi	Thyagaraja

== Chembai - The Greatest ==
Accompanists: L. Subramaniam (Violin), T. V. Gopalakrishnan (Mridanga), Alangudi Ramachandran (Ghatam)
Label: His Master's Voice

Kriti	Raga	Tala	Composer
Sri Mahaganapathe	Gowla	Misrachapu	Muthuswami Dikshitar
Sri Balasubramanya	Bilahari	Misrachapu	Muthuswami Dikshitar
Varanarada	Vijayasri	Adi	Thyagaraja
Inkaa Dayarada	Chakravakam	Adi	Patnam Subramania Iyer
Samagana Vinodini	Hamsanandi	Adi	Lalita Dasar
Ksheera Sagara	Devagandhari	Adi	Thyagaraja
Varijadala	Arabhi	Adi	Lalita Dasar
Evariki Telusunamma	Dhanyasi	Adi	Lalita Dasar
Ennil Kanindha	Sankarabharanam	Adi	Lalita Dasar
Nadamadi Thirintha	Kambhoji	Khandachapu	Papavinasa Mudaliyar
Arukku Ponn Ambalam	Bilahari	Adi	Gopalakrishna Bharathi
Rara Muralidhara	Vijayanagari	Adi	Lalita Dasar

== Live Concert 1 ==
Title: Sri Chembai Vaidyanatha Bagavathar - Live Concert 1
Accompanists: Lalgudi Jayaraman (Violin), Palani Subramaniam Pillai (Mridanga), Alangudi Ramachandran (Ghatam)
Release Date: 1 January 1987
Label: Inreco

Kriti	Raga	Tala	Composer	mm:ss
Raghuvamsa Sudha	Kathanakuthookalam	Adi	Patnam Subramania Iyer	05:36
Vadera Deivamu Manasa	Pantuvarali	Adi	Thyagaraja	14:48
Saraguna Palimpa	Kedaragowla	Adi	Poochi Srinivasa Iyengar	08:28
Sri Subramanyaya	Kambhoji	Rupaka	Muthuswami Dikshitar	19:02
Manasayetulo	Malayamarutam	Rupaka	Thyagaraja	04:50
Vande Matharam Ambikam	Varali	-	-	03:58

== Classical Live Concert ==
Title: Sri Chembai Vaidyanatha Bagavathar - Classical Live Concert
Label: Inreco

Kriti	Raga	Tala	Composer	mm:ss
Endaro Mahaanubhaavulu	Sree	Adi	Thyagaraja	12:03
Nidhichala Sukhama	Kalyani	Misrachapu	Thyagaraja	16:13
Mahishasura Mardhini	Bilahari	Misrachapu	Muthuswami Dikshitar	08:39
Durmarga chara	Ranjani	Rupaka	Thyagaraja	04:25
Nrithyathi mama	Ragamalika	Adi	Lalita Dasar	06:37
Saraswathi Chaya	Chaya Tharangini	Adi	Muthuswami Dikshitar	02:35
Thillana	Jonpuri	Adi	Veene Sheshanna	04:10

== Live Concert ==
Title: Sri Chembai Vaidyanatha Bagavathar - Live Concert
Label: Gitaa

Kriti	Raga	Tala	Composer
Vathapi Ganapathim	Hamsadhwani	Adi	Muthuswami Dikshitar
Shankaracharyam	Shankarabharanam	Adi	Subbarama Dikshitar
Ragam Tanam Pallavi	Anandabhairavi	Adi	-
Thaye Yashoda	Thodi	Adi	Oottukkadu Venkata Kavi
Karuna Cheivan	Yadukula Kambhoji	Adi	Irayimman Thampi

== Gayana Gandharva ==
Chembai Vaidyanatha Bhagavatar Vocal Support: Jayan & Vijayan Violin: M.S.Gopalakrishnan Mridangam: T. V. Gopalakrishnan Label: AVM Audio

Kriti	Raga	Tala	Composer
Bantureethi	Hamsanadham	Adi	Thyagaraja
Manavyalakim	Nalinakanti	Adi	Thyagaraja
Ethavedu	Saraswati Manohari	Adi	Thyagaraja
Samagana Vinodini	Hamsanandi	Adi	Lalita Dasar
Ela Nee Daya	Atana	Adi	Thyagaraja
Ragam Tanam Pallavi	Bhairavi	-	-

== See also ==
- Chembai Vaidyanatha Bhagavatar
- Carnatic Music
