= List of Carnatic composers =

List of composers of Carnatic music, a subgenre of Indian classical music. Chronologically they can be grouped into 4 different Eras: Pre-Trinity Era, Trinity Era, Post Trinity Era and Modern Era. Composers are listed here based on this classification and their birth years are provided to the extent available.

== Pre-Trinity Era composers (17th century and prior) ==
These are early stage composers that created the rules and foundations of classical music.

1. Allama Prabhu (12th century)
2. Andal (9th century)
3. Tirugnana sambandar (7th century)
4. Arunagirinathar (b.1480)
5. Bhadraachala Raama daasu (1620–1688)
6. Jayadeva, (12th Century) - Composed Gita Govinda
  1. Prathama Vaggeyakara(First poet-composer) of Carnatic and Hindustani music forms to compose art music (in contrast to traditional bhakti poems) involving ragas; he is praised for his contributions to dance and music by his contemporary and later musicologists in their musical treatises
7. Kanakadasa (1509–1609)
8. Karaikkal Ammeiyar (7th century)
9. Kshetrayya (1600–1680)
10. Madhwacharya (12th century)
11. Manikkavasagar (10th century)
12. Muthu Thandavar (1525–1625)
13. Naraharitirtha (1250–1333)
14. Narayana Teertha (1650–1725)
15. Padmanabha Tirtha (12th century)
16. Papanasa Mudaliar (1650–1725)
17. Paidala Gurumurti Sastri (17th century) - Composed over 1000 geethams
18. Purandaradasa (1484–1564)
19. Raghavendra Swami (1595–1671)
20. Sarangapani (1680–1750)
21. Sripadaraya (1404–1502)
22. Sundaramurti (7th century)
23. Thirunavukkarasar (7th century)
24. Tallapaka Annamacharya (1408–1503)
25. Vadirajatirtha (1480–1600)
26. Vijaya Dasa (1682–1755)
27. Vyasatirtha (1460–1539)

== Trinity Era Composers (18th Century) ==
Composers of 18th Century started a new era in the history of Carnatic music with the introduction of new ragas, krithis and musical forms that are widely adopted and laid foundation for what we know today as Classical music. Trinity are the biggest contributors of this era even though there are a large number of musicians and composers that left their mark during this period.

1. Arunachala Kavi (1711–1788)
2. Ghanam Krishna Iyer (1790–1854)
3. Gopala Dasa (1722–1762)
4. Iraiyamman Tampi (1782–1856)
5. Jagannatha Dasa (1728–1809)
6. Kaiwara Sri Yogi Nareyana (1730–1840)
7. Krishnarajendra Wodeyar III (1799–1868)
8. Marimuttha Pillai (1717–1787)
9. Muthuswami Dikshitar (1775–1835)
10. Mysore Sadasiva Rao (b. 1790)
11. Oottukkadu Venkata Kavi (1700–1765)
12. Pacchimiriam Adiyappa (early 18th century)
13. Sadasiva Brahmendra (18th century)
14. Thyagaraja Swami (1767–1847)
15. Anai Ayya brothers (1776–1857)
16. Tiruvarur Ramaswami Pillai (1798–1852)
17. Ramaswami Dikshitar (1735–1817)
18. Swathi Thirunal Rama Varma (1813-1846)
19. Syama Sastri (1762–1827)

== Post-Trinity Era composers (19th century) ==
1. Ajjada Adibhatla Narayana Dasu (1864–1945)
  1. Primary contribution is in the area of Hari katha. Also created several krithis as part of the hari kathas he authored
2. Ambi Dikshitar (1863–1936)
  1. Propagated Muthuswami Dikshitar compositions and helped bring them into modern era
  2. Also used the mudra of guruguha for about 10 compositions we have available at this time
3. Annamalai Reddiyar (1865–1891)
4. Cheyyur Chengalvaraya Sastri (1810–1900)
5. Chittor Subrahmanya Pillai (1898–1975)
6. Dharmapuri Subbarayar
  1. Composed more than 50 Javalis
7. Ennappadam Venkatarama Bhagavatar (1880–1961)
8. Gopalakrishna Bharathi (1811–1896)
9. Jayachamaraja Wodeyar (1919–1974)
10. Kavi Kunjara Bharati (1810–1896)
11. Koteeswara Iyer (1870–1940)
  1. Composed in all 72 melakarta raagas
12. Kotthavaasal Venkatarama Ayyar (1810–1880)
13. Maha Vaidyanatha Iyer (1844–1893)
  1. Composed Mela raga maalika
14. Manambuchavadi Venkatasubbayyar
15. Mayuram Viswanatha Sastri (1893–1958)
16. Muthiah Bhagavatar (1877–1945)
17. Mysore T. Chowdiah (1894–1967)
18. Mysore Vasudevacharya (1865–1961)
19. Neelakanta Sivan (1839–1900)
20. Pallavi Seshayyar (1842–1905)
21. Papanasam Sivan (1890–1973)
22. Patnam Subramania Iyer (1845–1902)
23. Pattabhiramayya (b. 1863)
24. Poochi Srinivasa Iyengar (1860–1919)
25. Rallapalli Anantha Krishna Sharma (1893–1979)
26. Subbarama Dikshitar (1839–1906)
27. Subbaraya Sastri (1803–1862)
  1. Son of Shyama Shastri and First generation disciple of Tyagaraja
28. Mahakavi Subramanya Bharathiyar (1882–1921)
29. Shuddhananda Bharati (1897–1990)
30. Thanjavur Quartet (1801–1856)
31. Tiger Varadachariar (1876–1950)
32. Tiruvottriyur Tyagayya (1845–1917)
  1. Son of Veena Kuppayya
33. Veena Kuppayya (1798–1860)
  1. First generation disciple of Tyagaraja
34. Veene Sheshanna (1852–1926)

== Modern Era composers (20th century and beyond) ==
- A. Kanyakumari
- Ambujam Krishna (1917–1989)
- Annavarapu Rama Swamy (b. 1926)
- G. N. Balasubramaniam (1910–1965)
- Kalyani Varadarajan (1923–2003)
  - Composed in all 72 Melakarta ragas
- K. Ramaraj (1936-2009)
- Lalgudi Jayaraman (1930–2013)
- M.Balamuralikrishna (1930–2016)
  - Composed in all 72 melakarta ragas and created several new ragas including those with fewer than 5 notes and 200+ compositions
- M. D. Ramanathan (1923–1984)
- Maharajapuram Santhanam (1928–1992)
- N. Ravikiran (b. 1967)
  - Composed in all 35 Sulaadi talas
- N. S. Ramachandran (1908-1981)
- Nallan Chakravartula Krishnamacharyulu (1924–2006)
- Periyasami Thooran (1908-1987)
  - Composed only lyrics. Music is set by a few contemporary musicians
- Samavedam Shanmukha Sarma (b. 1967)
  - Composed only lyrics. Music is set by a few contemporary musicians
- Suguna Purushothaman (1941–2015)
  - Composed navagraha krithis in Tamil
- T. V. Gopalakrishnan (b. 1932)
- T. R. Subramaniam (1929–2013)
- R. Ramachandran Nair (Thulasivanam - b. 1939)
  - Composed only lyrics. Music is set by a few contemporary musicians
- Sundaranarayana (1938-2013)
  - Composed only lyrics. Music is set by a few contemporary musicians

== Pre-Trinity composers (born in 17th century or earlier) ==
| Composer | Years | Languages | Approx. number of compositions | Signature (Insignia) | Other Info |
|---|---|---|---|---|---|
| Naraharitirtha | 1250? – 1333) | Sanskrit | | Narahari | Composed Dasara Padas |
| Sripadaraya | 1404–1502 | Kannada, Sanskrit | | Ranga Vittala | Composed Dasara Padas |
| Tallapaka Annamacharya | 1408–1503 | Telugu, Sanskrit | 36,000 compositions were composed, out of which around 12,000 are only available as of today | Venkatachala, venkatagiri, venkatadhri, venkatesu | Called as Telugu pada-kavita pitamaha; composed in themes srungara (love), adhyatma (bhakti) and philosophical in 100 ragas; also the author of the musical text Sankeertana Lakshana |
| Vadirajatirtha | 1480–1600) | Kannada, Sanskrit | hundreds | Hayavadana | Composed Dasara Padas in his Ramagadya, Vaikunthavarnane and Lakshmisobanehadu |
| Arunagirinathar | 1480– | Tamil | 760 | | Composed Tiruppugazh |
| Purandara Dasa | 1484–1564 | Kannada, Sanskrit | 475,000, of which only around 2000 have come down to us | Purandara Vittala | Set the Carnatic music in its present form; composed basic exercises for practice like sarali and janta varisai, and thus known as 'Karnataka Sangeetha Pithamaha', meaning the Grandfather of Carnatic music. |
| Kanaka Dasa | 1509–1609 | Kannada | 300 | Adi Keshava | Composed Dasara Padas in native metrical forms such as Suladi and Ugabhoga and wrote 5 classical Kavya epics poems in Shatpadi |
| Muthu Thandavar | 1525–1625 | Tamil | 165 | | |
| Kshetrayya or Kshetrajna or Varadayya | 1600–1680 | Telugu | 100 | Muvvagopala | Composed immortal padams which are even popular today in Bharathanatyam & Kuchipudi. Also the oldest composer whose tunes are available |
| Bhadraachala Raama daasu | 1620–1688 | Telugu | 500 | Bhadradri | Composed devotional songs |
| Narayana Teertha or Tallavajjhala Govinda Sastry | 1650–1745 | Telugu, Sanskrit | 200 | Vara Naaraayana Teertha | Composed Krishna leelaa Tarangini |
| Papanasa Mudaliar | 1650–1725 | Tamil | | | |
| Sarangapani | 1680–1750 | Telugu | 220 | Venugopalu | |
| Paidala Gurumurti Sastri | 17th century | Telugu, Sanskrit | | | Composed mainly geetams, many of which have since been lost |
| Vijaya Dasa | 1682–1755 | Kannada | 25,000 | Vijaya Vittala | Composed Dasara Padas in native metrical forms such as Suladi and Ugabhoga |
| Oottukkadu Venkata Kavi | 1700–1765 | Tamil, Sanskrit | 600 | | Composed in complex talas like Sankeerna Matyam and Misra Ata. Also an early composer of Navavarana kritis. He was the pioneer of the Madhyama Kala Prayoga. Had knowledge of ancient Tamil tags system too. His Sapta Ratnas were the precursors to Thyagaraja's pancharatnas. His kritis often used complicated madhyamakala systems. |
| Arunachala Kavi | 1711–1788 | Tamil | 320 | | |
| Marimutthu Pillai | 1717–1787 | Tamil | 42 | | |
| Gopala Dasa | 1722–1762 | Kannada | 10,000 | Gopala Vittala | Composed Dasara Padas in native metrical forms such as Suladi and Ugabhoga |
| Pacchimiriam Adiyappa | early 18th century | Telugu | | | Composed the immortal Viriboni bhairavi ata tala varnam |
| Sadasiva Brahmendra | 18th century | Sanskrit | 95 | | |
| Jagannatha Dasa | 1728–1809 | Kannada | 260 | Jagannatha Vittala | Composed Dasara Padas, and the Kavya poems Harikathamritasara in the native shatpadi and Tattva suvvali in the native tripadi meters |
| Kaiwara Sri Yogi Nareyana | 1730–1840 | Kannada & Telugu | 172 | Amaranareyana | Composed 20 Kannada Keerthanam and 152 Telugu Padas, and the Kavya poems on various gods |
| Ramaswami Dikshitar | 1735–1817 | Telugu, Sanskrit | | Thyageshwara | Composed many varnams, padams, and kirtanas; popularly considered the inventor of Hamsadwhani |

== Trinity-Age composers (born in 18th century) ==
These composers lived during the time of the Trinity and there are recorded instances of their interaction with the Trinity.

| Composer | Years | Languages | Signature(Insignia) | Approx. Number of Compositions | Other Info |
|---|---|---|---|---|---|
| Syama Sastri | 1762–1827 | Telugu, Sanskrit | Shyama Krishna | 400 | Eldest of the trinity. He came from a family of priests at the Bangaru Kamakshi temple in Thanjavur, he composed on many devi temples in the region. He is famous for his use of chitta swara sahityam and complicated talams, as well as modernizing Ananda Bhairavi raga |
| Thyagaraja Swami | 1767–1847 | Telugu, Sanskrit | Thyagaraja | 24000 of which only 700 are available today | Most famous of the trinity, composed many kritis on lord Rama, and also a few group kritis at temples for Shiva and Parvati. He composed the famous ghanaraga pancharatna kritis, and was famous for the use of ragas such as Kharaharapriya and Ritigowla. |
| Muthuswami Dikshitar | 1775–1835 | Sanskrit | Guruguha | 400 | Youngest of the trinity, famous for his use of madhyamakala sahityams, raga mudra, and Sanskrit rhyming. He composed multiple group kritis. |
| Iraiyamman Tampi | 1782–1856 | Malayalam, Sanskrit | Padmanabha | 40 | |
| Ghanam Krishna Iyer | 1790–1854 | Tamil | Muthu Kumara | 85 | |
| Tiruvarur Ramaswami Pillai | 1798–1852 | Tamil | Vedapura | | |
| Thanjavur Quartet | 1801–1856 | Telugu, Tamil, Sanskrit | | | |
| Kavi Kunjara Bharati | 1810–1896 | Tamil | Kavi Kunjaran | 200 | |
| Cheyyur Chengalvaraya Sastri | 1810–1900 | Sanskrit, Telugu | Chengalvarayadasa | 1000 | |
| Swathi Thirunal | 1813–1846 | Sanskrit, Tamil, Malayalam, Kannada, Telugu, Hindi, Braj Bhasha | Padmanabha, Sarasinabha, etc. | 300+ | |

== 19th-century composers ==
| Composer | Years | Languages | Approx. Number of Compositions | Signature(Insignia) | Other Info |
|---|---|---|---|---|---|
| Mahakavi Subramanya Bharathiyar | 1882–1921 | Tamil | 230 | | |
| Annamalai Reddiyar | 1865–1891 | Tamil | 40 | | |
| Anai Ayya brothers | 19th century | Telugu, Tamil | 20 | Umadasa | |
| Dharmapuri Subbarayar | 19th century | Telugu | 50 | Dharmapuri | Composed many javalis |
| Ennappadam Venkatarama Bhagavatar | 1880–1961 | | | Venkataramana | |
| Gopalakrishna Bharathi | 1811–1896 | Tamil | 395 | Balakrishnan | |
| Koteeswara Iyer | 1870–1940 | Tamil, Sanskrit | 200 | Kavikunjaradasan | Composed in all 72 Melakarta raagas |
| Krishnarajendra Wodeyar III | 1799–1868 | Sanskrit | | | |
| Jayachamaraja Wodeyar | 1919–1974 | Sanskrit | 70 | Srividya | |
| Maha Vaidyanatha Iyer | 1844–1893 | Sanskrit, Tamil | 100 | Guhadasa | Composed 72-Melakarta raaga maalika |
| Manambuchavadi Venkatasubbayyar | 19th century | Telugu, Tamil | 50 | Venkatesa | Cousin and disciple of Thyagaraja |
| Mayuram Viswanatha Sastri | 1893–1958 | Tamil, Sanskrit | 160 | Vishwam, Vedapuri | |
| Muthiah Bhagavatar | 1877–1945 | Tamil, Kannada Sanskrit | 390 | Harikesha | Composed many famous songs, including a set of 108 songs on goddess Chamundeshwari at the behest of the kings of Mysore |
| Mysore Sadasiva Rao | b. 1790 | Telugu, Sanskrit | 100 | Sadashiva | |
| Mysore Vasudevacharya | 1865–1961 | Telugu, Sanskrit | 250 | Vasudeva | |
| Neelakanta Sivan | 1839–1900 | Tamil | 300 | Nilakantha | |
| Pallavi Seshayyar | 1842–1905 | Telugu | 75 | Shesha | |
| Papanasam Sivan | 1890–1973 | Tamil | 535 | Ramadasan | |
| Patnam Subramania Iyer | 1845–1902 | Telugu | 100 | Venkatesha | |
| Pattabhiramayya | c. 1863 | Tamil | | | Composed javalis |
| Poochi Srinivasa Iyengar | 1860–1919 | Telugu | 100 | Srinivasa | Composed varnams, javalis and krithis including the famous mohanam raga varnam ninnu kori. |
| Shuddhananda Bharati | 1897–1990 | Tamil, Sanskrit | 1090 | | |
| Subbarama Dikshitar | 1839–1906 | Telugu | 50 | | Grandson of Baluswami Dikshitar, younger brother of Muthuswami Dikshitar. Author of the important Telugu musical treatise Sangeetha sampradaya pradarshini |
| Subbaraya Sastri | 1803–1862 | Telugu | 12 | Kumara | Son of Syama Sastri |
| Tiruvottriyur Tyagayya | 1845–1917 | Telugu | 80 | Venugopala | Son of Veena Kuppayya |
| Veena Kuppayya | 1798–1860 | Telugu | 100 | Gopaladasa | Disciple of Thyagaraja |
| Ajjada Adibhatla Narayana Dasu | 1864–1945 | Telugu | 100 | | Composed in all 72 melakarthas and a geetha-malika in 90 ragas in manjari meter called Dasha Vidha Raga Navati Kusuma Manjari; also composed in rare talams like Sankeerna chapu |

== Modern-age composers (born in 20th century and beyond) ==
| Composer | Years | Languages | Approx. Number of Compositions | Signature(Insignia) | Other Info |
|---|---|---|---|---|---|
| G. N. Balasubramaniam | 1910–1965 | Telugu, Sanskrit, Tamil | 250 | None | Did not use a mudra; Ranjani Niranjani, Saraswati Namostute, and Sri Chakra Raja Nilaye are popular compositions. |
| Ambujam Krishna | 1917–1989 | Kannada, Telugu, Sanskrit, Tamil | 600 | None | Did not use a mudra; Her songs have been set to tune by leading Carnatic musicians. |
| M. D. Ramanathan | 1923–1984 | Telugu, Sanskrit, Tamil, Malayalam | 300 | varadasa | Composed in all popular ragas; Used signature "Varada dasa"; Disciple of Tiger Varadachariar |
| Kalyani Varadarajan | 1923–2003 | Telugu, Sanskrit, Tamil | 1000 + | kalyani | Composed in all 72 Melakarta raagas; Used signature "Kalyani" Composed songs on many deities, mainly Sholinganallur Narasimhar, Sholinganallur Anjaneyar, Thayars, and most all Devis. |
| K. Ramaraj | 1936-2009 | Telugu, Tamil, Sanskrit | 200+ | ragamudra | Did not use a composer mudra; Vaggeyakkara who composed both the lyrics and the tune; specialised in less popular and vivaadhi ragas |
| M.Balamuralikrishna | 1930–2016 | Telugu, Kannada, Sanskrit, Tamil | 400 | murali | Composed in all 72 Melakarta raagas; Used signature "Muraligana"; Created several ragas, with 4 notes and 3 notes; Invented a new Tala system; Disciple of Parupalli Ramakrishnayya Pantulu, a direct descendant of the shishya parampara (lineage of disciples) of Tyagaraja. |
| Lalgudi Jayaraman | 1930–2013 | Telugu, Sanskrit, Tamil | 100 | None | His sparkling thillana are especially popular and a staple of Carnatic music concerts. |
| Mahesh Mahadev | present | Sanskrit, Kannada | | Sri Skanda | Created many new ragas and composed kritis, varnams and devaranama |
| Mysore Manjunath | present | Instrumental | | | Manjunath has created many New ragas including Yaduveera Manohari, Bharatha. |

== Other composers ==
- Rallapalli Anantha Krishna Sharma (1893–1979)
- N. S. Ramachandran
- Shishunala Sharif
- Madurai N. Krishnan

== Other composers in Mysore Kingdom ==
- Veene Sheshanna (1852–1926)
- Rallapalli Anantha Krishna Sharma (1893–1979)
- Mysore T. Chowdiah (1894–1967)
- Jayachamaraja Wodeyar (1919–1974)
- Tiger Varadachariar (1876–1950)

== Other composers—Bhakti Saints ==
In addition to the above composers, various Bhakti saints of medieval India also composed devotional hymns, verses and songs. First six composer used ancient Tamil music [pannicai] which later evolved to the Carnatic musical tradition over the centuries.

- Karaikkal Ammeiyar (7th century)
- Thirunavukkarasar (7th century)
- Thirugnana Sambanthar (7th century)
- Sundaramurti (7th century)
- Andal (9th century)
- Manikkavasagar (10th century)
- Madhwacharya (12th century)
- Padmanabha Tirtha (12th century)
- Narahari Tirtha (12th century)
- Allama Prabhu (12th century)
- Muthu Thandavar (14th century)
- Sripadaraja (14th century)
- Vyasatirtha (1460–1539)
- Vadirajatirtha (1480–1600)
- Narayana Teertha (1580–1660)
- Kanakadasa (1509–1609)
- Raghavendra Swami (1595–1671)
- Vijaya Dasa (1682–1755)

== See also ==
- List of composers who created ragas
- List of Carnatic instrumentalists
