= Mannargudi Sambasiva Bhagavatar =

Mannargudi Sambasiva Bhagavathar (also spelt Bagavathar) (1912–2004) was a Carnatic musician, musicologist, Harikatha exponent and composer.

He served Carnatic music for over seven decades. He was a disciple of Maharajapuram Viswanatha Iyer in music and Madurai Narayana Bhagavatar and Smt Saraswathy Bai in Harikatha.

He performed more than 1000 music concerts and 7000 Harikatha performances all over India. He started composing from his teens and has composed more than 3000 songs in many languages such as Tamil, Telugu and Sanskrit. He composed different musical forms such as Geetham, Varnam, Krithi, Javali, Padam, Thillana, Ragamalika and Harikatha. The first edition of his compositions are published in Tamil in the book 'Sangeetha Ratna Mala'. Sambasiva Bhagavatar's musical discourse of Muthuswami Dikshitar charitram, Ramana Maharshi Charitram, Purandara Dasa charitram and Seetha Kalyanam are brought out in CD's. His compositions (Sahityams) are released in cassettes and CD's.

His composition "Neerajadalanayana" in raga "Maand" was popularised by his guru Maharajapuram Viswanatha Iyer.

== Early years ==
Sambasiva Bhagavatar was born in Mannargudi in the old Tanjavur district in Tamil Nadu, India in the year 1912 to Rajam Iyer and Meenakshi Ammal. He spent his early years in Mannargudi and later moved to Madras (now Chennai).He studied in Sri Ramakrishna Mission in Mylapore. He then had his carnatic music training through the traditional Gurukulam from Sri Maharajapuram Viswanatha Iyer. He imbibed the spirit of musical style of his Guru Viswanatha Iyer. He was then known as Sambasiva Iyer. He switched over from Carnatic Vocal music to Harikatha Kalakshepam and became known as Sambasiva Bhagavatar.

== Family ==
Sambasiva Bhagavatar had three sons Rajaraman, Balasubramanian and Madhavan and two daughters Balasaraswathi and Chandra.

== Awards and Titles ==
Bhagavatar was a recipient of the Government of Tamil Nadu's "Kalaimamani" award. He received many other awards and tiles such as "Harikatha Kalakshepa Jyothi", "Katharathnakara", "Sangeetha Sahithya Jyothi", "Sangeetha Ratnam", "Harikatha Sironmani", "Sangeetha Kala Sikhamani", "Nadakkanal", "Harikatha Ratna", "Kalaseva Nirata", "Sangeetha Harikatha Bhusanam", "Sangeetha Harikatha Kala Praveena", and the Madras Music Academy's "Vaggeyakara Award" in the year 2001 and the special honour in the category of Musician and Musicologist "T.T.K. Award" in the year 1999.

He served as a lecturer in Kathakalakshepam at Tamil Nadu Government College of Music, Chennai and as an inspector of Music and Dance schools for the Tamil Nadu Iyal Isai Nataka Mandram, the cultural wing of the Government of Tamil Nadu. He trained many students in the art of Music and Harikatha Kalakshepam. His prominent disciples included the violinist M. Chandrasekaran, K. V. Krishnan, Lalitha Alladi Ramakrishnan, Jaya Krishnan and others. In Harikatha his disciples include Susheela Achudaraman, Gowri Rajagopal, Shyamala Ramachandran and others.

== Compositions ==
A few of his Sahityams or compositions are listed below

Composition	Form	Raga	Tala
Sarasamanaiya	Varnam	Sriranjani	Kandajathi Triputa
Manjubhashana	Varnam	Kannada gowlai	Adi
Ekadantham	Krithi	Hamsadhvani	Rupakam
Vallabha vallabam	Krithi	Nata	Adi
Samajathi pananam	Krithi	Harikambhoji	Rupakam
Saarasa Sambhava	Krithi	Pantuvarali	Adi
Sri Rajagoplam	Krithi	Kharaharapriya	Adi
Engum niraindha	Krithi	Bhairavi	Adi
Neevanti	Krithi	Sowrashtram	Kanda chapu
Sama gana lola	Krithi	Kunthala varali	Misra chapu
Nijamukha nammithi	Krithi	Begada	Adi
Nannu brovara	Krithi	Shuddha Dhanyasi	Adi
Namagiri Sadhana	Krithi	Huseni	Misra chapu
Sari evarunaanura	Krithi	Ramapriya	Adi
Venkateshwara	Krithi	Kambhoji	Misra chapu
Devaki vasudeva	Krithi	Senchuruti	Misra chapu
Paavana pavana	Krithi	Simhendramadhyamam	Adi
Amba Dharmasamvardhini	Krithi	Yadukula Kambhoji	Adi
Guruvai Ninaindhurugu	Krithi	Poorvi kalyani	Adi
Kapaleeshwara	Krithi	Sahana	Adi
Intha thamasamu	Krithi	Naatai kurinji	Adi
Ambikaye	Krithi	Arabhi	Adi
Kamakshi Kalyani	Krithi	Kalyani	Misra chapu
Purandaradasa	Krithi	Abheri	Adi
Sri Thiagaraja	Krithi	Atana	Rupakam
Maruthi mahimalu	Krithi	Hindolam	Adi
Maname maravadhe	Krithi	Mandhari	Adi
Nandagopa nandana	Krithi	Mohanam	Tisra nadai Adi
Saravanabhava	Krithi	Shuddha Saveri	Adi
Chinthayami Shanmuga	Krithi	Shanmukhapriya	Adi
Dhakshinamurthim	Krithi	Surutti	Misra chapu
Valli deva Sena	Krithi	Abheri	Adi
Jalaja Sambhava	Krithi	Kalyani	Adi
Sri Ramadasa	Krithi	Vasantha	Rupakam
Neerajadala nayana	Krithi	Maand	Adi
Varalakshmi	Krithi	Madhyamavati	Adi
Nyaayamukadhura	Javali	Dhanyasi	Adi
Valachi vachi	Javali	Saveri	Adi
Varaadha dhadi sakiye	Padam	Kamaas	Adi
Cheliyarammanave	Javali	Behag	Adi
Ivaraaradi sakiye	Padam	Surutti	Adi
Thadhara thani dheemtha	Thillana	Hindolam	Adi
Thaanitha dheemtha	Thillana	Behag	Adi

== Service to Thiagaraja sangeetha Vidwath Samajam ==
Bhagavatar dedicated a major portion of his life to the growth and development of Sri Thiagaraja Sangeetha Vidwath Samajam in Mylapore, Chennai. He was the Treasurer, Secretary, President and finally chairman and executive trustee of the Samajam. He served the institution for over six decades. As per the advice of Chandrasekarendra Saraswati Swamigal, he installed a Panchaloga Vigraham of Saint Thiagaraja at the Vidhwath Samajam Premises.
