= Ashtapadi =

Sanskrit hymns

Ashtapadi

Ashtapadis or Ashtapadi refers to the Sanskrit hymns of the Gita Govinda, composed by Jayadeva in the 12th century. The ashtapadis, which describe the beauty of Lord Krishna and the love between Krishna and the gopis, are considered a masterpiece in esoteric spirituality and the theme of 'Divine romance'. The literal meaning of ashtapathi, 'eight-steps', refers to the fact that each hymn is made of eight couplets (eight sets of two lines). It is also the source of the word ashtāpada, an Indian board game, the forerunner of chess. Although the original tunes of the ashtapadis were lost in history, they remain popular and are widely sung in a variety of tunes, and used in classical dance performances, across India. Ashtapadis are regularly performed at Kerala temples in the accompaniment of an idakka; a genre of music called sopana sangeetham.

The lyrical poetry of the Gita Govinda is divided into twelve chapters, each of which is sub-divided into twenty four divisions called Prabandha. The Prabandhas contain couplets grouped into eights, called ashtapadis.

- Melody type
- Rasa (aesthetics)
- Works of Jayadeva

== List of Ashtapadis ==
Today, the ashtapadis are sung in a variety of tunes and the list below is just a sample of some of the raga scales used. The original tunes of the ashtapadis are unknown and likely lost in history.

- 1. pralaya payodhi jale (jaya jagadisha hare) - Sowrashtram
- 2. shrita kamalā kucha-mandala (jaya jaya deva hare) - Bhairavi
- 3. lalita lavanga-latā parishilana (viharati harir-iha) - Huseni/Vasantha
- 4. chandana charchita nila kalevara - Kamavardhini
- 5. sancharad-adhara sudhā madhura (rāse harim-iha) - Thodi/Shuddha Sarang
- 6. nibhruta nikunja gruham - Kambhoji
- 7. mām iyam chalitā vilokya - Bhupalam
- 8. nindati chandanam indu-kirañam (sā virahe tava dinā) - Sowrashtram/Dwijavanthi/Darbari Kanada
- 9. stana-vinihitam api hāram udāram - Bilahari
- 10. vahati malaya samire (tava virahe vanamāli) - Anandabhairavi
- 11. rati-sukha-sāre gatam abhisāre (dhira samire yamunā tire) - Kedaragowla or Pahadi
- 12. pashyati dishi dishi (nātha hare) - Sankarabharanam
- 13. kathita samayepi - Ahiri
- 14. smara-samaro-chita virachita veshā - Saranga
- 15. samudita madane ramañi vadane - Saveri
- 16. anila tarala kuvalaya nayanena - Punnagavarali/Vishwapriya/Shuddha Saranga
- 17. rajani janita guru-jāgara (yāhi mādhava yāhi keshava mā vada) - Arabhi
- 18. harir-abhisarati vahati - Yadukulakamboji
- 19. vadasi yadi kinchid-api (priye chārushile muncha) - Mukhaari
- 20. virachita chātu-vachana rachanam - Kalyani
- 21. manju-tara kunja tala keli sadane (vilasa) - Ghanta
- 22. rādhā vadana vilokana - Madhyamavati
- 23. kishalaya shayana tale - Nadhanamakriya
- 24. kuru yadu-nandana (nijagāda sā) - Surutti/Chakravakam
