= Tiruvottriyur Tyagayyar =

Tiruvottriyur Tyagayyar (1845–1917) was a Carnatic music composer. He was the son of the composer Veena Kuppayyar.

His style was very much similar to that of Tyagaraja just like his father. He was also known as 'Mutyalapeta Tyagayyar' based on his Nivasam and also was known as 'Swarasimha Tyagayyar'. His first Guru was his father's disciple Fiddle Ponnuswamy. He was dedicated to music for life. His home was a paradise for Rasikas and also many famous Vaggeyakaras. He was also very fluent in making Pallavis and Swarakalpana.

He was also proficient in playing Veena. His compositions mainly included Tana Varnams. Some of his famous compositions are

1. Chalamela in Darbar (Varnam)
2. Nenarunchi Nannelukora in Dhanyasi (Varnam)
3. Saraguna Nannela in Madhyamavati (Varnam)
4. Sami Dayajuda in Kedaragowla (Varnam)
5. Intha Modi in Saranga (Varnam)
6. Entho Prematho in Surutti (Varnam)
7. Karunimpa in Sahana (Varnam)
8. Sami Nee Pai in Anandabhairavi (Varnam)
9. Sarasijaksha in Mohanam
10. Kapadu Gananatha in Dhanyasi (A Praardhana)
11. Sarasvati Nanneppudu in Kalyani
12. Tyagarajaswami Guruni in Kharaharapriya
13. Kashtamulu Teerchinanu in Punnagavarali
14. Ituvanti in Kamavardhani
15. Sarasiruhanayana in Manirangu

He also tuned some Narayana Teertha Tarangalu. His main disciples include Ponnayya Pillai and Coimbatore Thayi. He had influence on Muthiah Bhagavatar's compositions too.

He composed mainly in the Telugu language.

== See also ==
- List of Carnatic composers
