= Navaragamalika =

Composition in Carnatic Music

Navaragamalika (pronounced navarāgamālika) is a composition in Carnatic Music that is composed using a collection of nine ragas. Each verse is set to a different raga.

== Etymology ==
Navaragamalika is the samasa of two words, nava and ragamalika. Nava means nine. Ragamalika means a garland of ragas in a composition.

== Compositions ==
The most well-known example of a Navaragamalika is Valachi Vachi, a Telugu varnam in the nine ragams of Kedaram, Shankarabharanam, Kalyani, Begada, Kambhoji, Yadukulakamboji, Bilahari, Mohanam and Shree ragam. The author of the varnam is said to be Patnam Subramania Iyer, though it is also attributed to Kottavasal Venkatarama Iyer.

Navaragamalikas are commonly used in the composition of Pada Varnams, which are a class of varnams composed mainly for dance. They are particularly useful when the song is intended to portray the Navarasas, or nine emotions. Navaragamalika Pada Varnams include:

Samiyai Azhaitodi Vaa, composed by K N Dandayuthapani Pillai, in ragas Todi, Mohanam, Vasanta, Devamanohari, Shankarabharanam, Saranga, Kaanada, Arabhi and Bhairavi. This composition makes use of the raga mudras in the Sahityam (lyrics) of the song.

Angaiyar Kanni, by Lalgudi Jayaraman, is a Navarasa Varnam. It is composed in ragas Bilahari - portraying Ananda (Bliss) or Veera (Valour), Huseni - portraying Shringara (Love), Valaji - Adbhuta (Wonder), Saranga - Hasya (Humour), Sucharitra - Bibhasta (Disgust), Atana - Raudra (Anger), Rasikapriya - Bhayanaka (Fear), Sahana - Karuna (compassion) and Nadanamakriya - Shantam (Peace).
