= Tiger Varadachariar =

Indian singer

- Born: 1 August 1876; Kolathur
- Died: 31 January 1950 (aged 73)

Tiger Varadachariar (1876–1950) was a Carnatic music vocalist from what is now the Indian state of Tamil Nadu. He was also a noted teacher, whose students include names like S. Ramanathan, M. D. Ramanathan, S. R. Janakiraman, the brothers B. V. Lakshmanan and B. V. Raman.

== Early life ==
Varadachariar was born on 1 August 1876 in Kolathur, Chingleput district.

Masilamani and Pedda Singaracharyulu encouraged him in his musical pursuits, and he studied under Patnam Subramania Ayyar for three years from the age of fourteen. However, financial family constraints required the young Varadachariar to take a position with the Survey Department at Calicut. He continued to pursue his musical interests, however, and when living in Mysore, he attracted the attention of Krishnaraja Wodeyar, who honoured him with the title of 'Tiger' and presented him with a 'thoda'.

Tiger Varadachari had lived for many years in Kaveripatnam then Salem District (now Krishnagiri). His humble home is still available as unaltered in Periyar St, Kaveripatnam.

Many of Varadachariar's family members also pursued careers in music. His father Ramanujachariar was a musical discoursed, his brother K.V. Srinivasa Ayyangar was a musicologist, and another brother K.V. Krishnamachariar was a veena player. Varadachariar also noted that he learned much from the singing of his sister.

== Music ==
Varadachariar composed 'Eediname Sudinamu' for C.Rajagopalachariar's visit to Kalkshetra in 1948 as Governor General.

'Nidu Charanamule' (Simhendramadyamam) under the Mudra of Tyagaraja is actually a composition of the 'Three musketeers of Kaladipet', the Tiger Brothers.

Composition	Type	Raga	Tala	Language
Shiva Perumane	Geetam	Madhyamavathi	Adi tala	Tamil
Anname	Varnam	Arabhi	Adi tala	Tamil
Ela Ne Vani Joli	Varnam	Saveri	Adi tala	Telugu
Chala Ninne	Varnam	Kedaram	Ata tala	Telugu
Karunai Kadale	Varnam	Kalyani	Adi tala	Tamil
Al Ilai Mel	Varnam	Mohanam	Adi tala	Tamil
Alai Kadal Tuyiloi	Varnam	Kambhoji	Adi tala	Tamil
Anudhinam Inimaiyai	Varnam	Bhairavi	Adi tala	Tamil
Devadi Devan Iru	Varnam	Kapi	Adi tala	Tamil
Kadal Noikku Veru	Varnam	Abhogi	Adi tala	Tamil
Chalamu Seyanela	Varnam	Hindolam	Adi tala	Telugu
Kamalakshi Ninne	Varnam	Manirangu	Mishra Jhampa	Telugu
Vandhana Monarinchithi	Varnam	Vachaspati	Mishra Jhampa	Telugu
Manam Irangadhadheno	Varnam	Sahana	Adi tala	Tamil
Sariyo Nee Seyyum	Varnam	Begada	Adi tala	Tamil
Mahishasura Mardhini	Varnam	Jana Ranjani	Adi tala	Telugu
Vanajakshi	Varnam	Jana Ranjani	Mishra Jhampa	Telugu
Ehi Manmatha Koti (Lyrics by S. Venkatachala Shastri, tuned by Tiger Varadachariar	Varnam	Sriranjani	Adi tala	Sanskrit
Nede Sudinamu	Kriti	Darbar	Adi tala	Telugu

== Awards ==
Varadachariar was awarded the Sangeetha Kalanidhi by Madras Music Academy in the year 1932.
