= M. D. Ramanathan =

Indian music composer

Manjapara Devesa Ramanathan (20 May 1913 – 27 April 1984) was a Carnatic music composer and vocalist who created a distinctive style of singing rich in Bhava and Laya. He was considered for the Madras Music Academy's Sangeetha Kalanidhi award in 1983. However, the award for that year was given to Sripada Pinakapani.

== Biography ==
Manjapara Devesa Ramanathan was born in Manjapra, Palakkad District, Madras Province (now Kerala), India on 20 May 1913, as the son of Devesa Bhagavathar and Seethalakshmi Ammal. His father Devesa Bhagavathar was a music teacher by profession. Ramanathan did his schooling in ASMMHSS Alathur in Palakkad and graduated with a BSc degree in Physics from Victoria College, Palakkad. On completion of his studies, he traveled to Madras along with his father to improve his musical talents.

During the same time, Rukmini Devi Arundale initiated a new course on Sangeeta Siromani at Kalakshetra. Ramanathan auditioned for the course and was the only student to be selected for the first batch commencing in 1944. Soon, he emerged as Tiger Varadachariar's favorite and was his closest disciple when the latter died in 1950.

After his graduation, Ramanathan continued as an assistant to his guru and later became Professor of Music at Kalakshetra. He also served as the Principal of the College of Fine Arts at Kalakshetra.

== Music career ==
=== Renderings ===
Ramanathan was known for his unique style of singing. In addition to having an extremely deep, booming voice, he rendered songs at an extremely slow pace, thereby allowing ample time for the listener to catch every phrase of a composition and gauge its meaning. He also sang with adequate bhava or expression. Ramanathan has sung in most Carnatic music ragas such as Sahana, Sri, Anandabhairavi, Reethigowla and Yadukula Kambhoji. Other favorite ragas of his include Kedaram, Kambhoji and Hamsadhwani. As he himself once admitted, his Vilambita Kaala Gaanam renderings during Kathakali dances had influenced his music and style of singing. Though Ramanathan is identified with his "trademark" slow pace of singing, he did include a few relatively brisk renderings in his concerts off and on.

His style of rendering was very different from the rather brisk style of rendering that had become quite popular then. Due to this, he also received a fair share of criticism from some music critics. During the rendering of krithis, he sometimes made alterations and embellishments to the lyrics. One highlight that his rasikas would always remember is starting the krithi from the anupallavi and then going to the pallavi.

=== Compositions ===
Ramanathan composed more than 300 songs in carnatic music in Tamil, Telugu and Sanskrit. He used the word Varadadasa as his mudra, in respect for Tiger Varadachariar, his teacher. Some of his famous compositions are:

Krithi	Ragam	Talam	Language
Anaimakhkattanai	Manirangu	Misra Chapu	Tamil
Aparadhamulellanu	Gowrimanohari	Adi	Telugu
Bhaja Bhaja Manuja	Behag	Adi	Sanskrit
Bharatesanute	Arabhi	Misra Chapu	Sanskrit
Brindavanaloka	Kalyani	Adi	Telugu
Brochutaku Samayamide	Begada	Rupaka	Telugu
Dandapani	Ramapriya	Rupaka	Telugu
Dari Neevale	Begada	Rupaka	Telugu
Dharmavati	Dharmavati	Rupaka	Telugu
Durgadevi	Sri	Adi	Sanskrit
Emdukichapalamu	Purvikalyani	Adi	Telugu
Ennakutram cheideno	Huseni	Adi	Tamil
Gajavadana	Hamsadhvani	Rupaka	Sanskrit
Gurucharanam	Kannada	Adi	Sanskrit
Guruvaram Bhaja Manasa	Dhanyasi	Rupakam	Sanskrit
Hariyum Haranum	Atana	Rupakam	Tamil
Janani Natajana paalini	Sankarabharanam	Roopakam	Sanskrit
Sagara shayana vibho	Bagesri	Adi	Telugu
Thillana	Kāpi	Misra Chaapu	Sanskrit
Tyagaraja Gurum	Kedaram	Rupakam	Sanskrit
Velavane Unakku	Sahana	Adi	Tamil
Vighnaraja Ninnu	Shreeranjani	Adi	Telugu

== Awards ==
For his contributions to music, Ramanathan was awarded the Padma Shri by the Government of India in 1974 and the Sangeet Natak Akademi Award in 1975. He received the Kerala Sangeetha Nataka Akademi Award in 1966. The Indian Fine Arts Society bestowed upon him the title of 'Sangeetha Kalasigamani' in 1976. He also served as a member of the Madras Music Academy's Experts Committee. He was also considered for the Academy's Sangeetha Kalanidhi award in the 1983–84 season though he did not get the award.

== Death ==
Ramanathan died after a long illness on 27 April 1984 at the age of 61.

== Legacy ==
Ramanathan's legacy has been kept alive through his albums and private recordings. M.D. Ramanathan, A Unique Octave in Music by Madhu Vasudevan, which was released in 2003, is a fitting tribute to the legend.
