= Nallan Chakravartula Krishnamacharyulu =

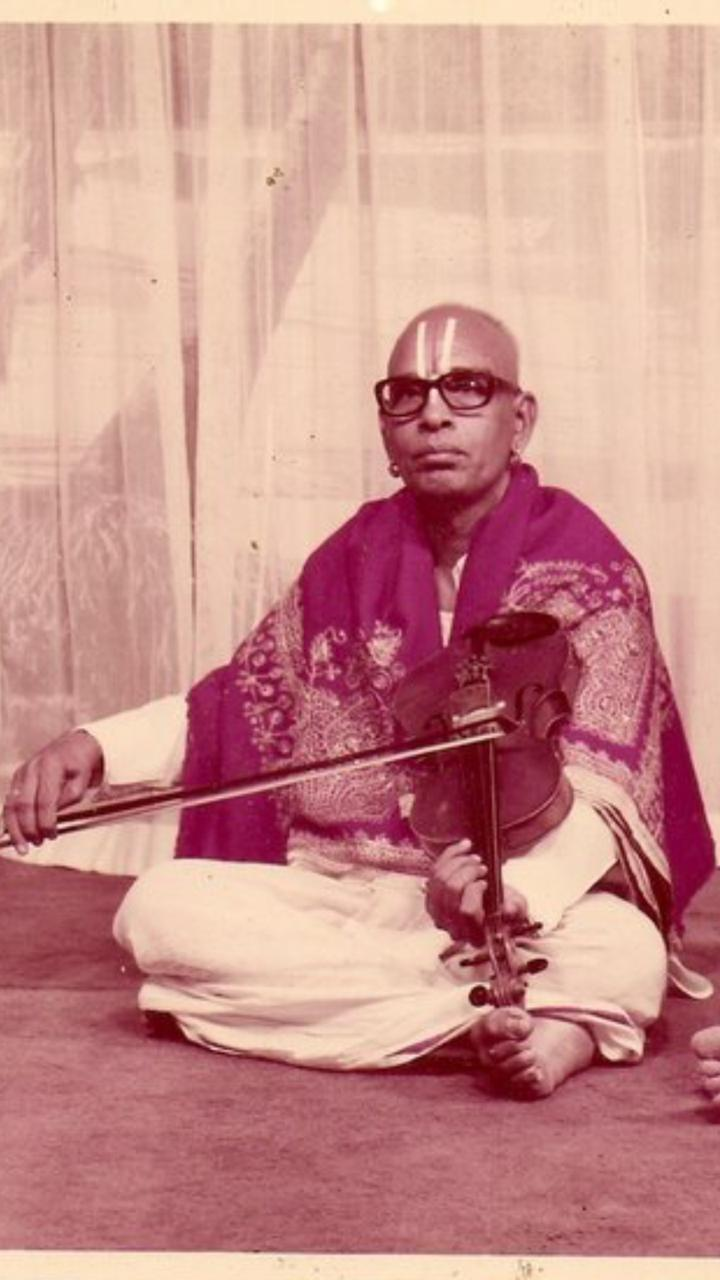
- Born: Andhra Pradesh, British India
- Died: 2006

Nallan Chakravartula Krishnamacharyulu (1924–2006) was an Indian scholar, musician, teacher and exponent of the art of hari katha. He belongs to the lineage of Saint Tyagaraja. He was a first generation disciple of Sriman Parupalli Krishnaiyyah pantulu. Being a top grade artist, his reach went above and beyond being a violinist and a musician. He was also a pandit in Sanskrit and Telugu literature who wrote and composed numerous Kritis, yaksha ganas, poems and harikathas. He was awarded the Vaggeyakara award by the Madras music academy in 2005.

== Compositions ==
Composition	Raga	Tala	Type	Language
Nannu Brova Samayamura	Suddhabangala	Adi	Varnam	Telugu
Gouri Sukumari Sankara Nari	Vasantha	Adi	Kriti	Sanskrit
Mara Jananim Asraye	Natakapriya	Adi	Kriti	Sanskrit
Sri Kanaka Durge	Kalyani	Adi	Kriti	Sanskrit
Gajavadanamasraye	Kedaram	Adi	Kriti	Sanskrit
Ehi Sannidehi	Husseni	Adi	Kriti	Sanskrit
Sarikaadu ra	Kedaragaula	Deshadi	Kriti	Telugu
Neepada Saarasa	Hemavathi	Roopaka	Kriti	Sanskrit
RamaKrishna Mahodayam(Guru Stuthi)	Kharaharapriya	Chaapa thalam	Kriti	Sanskrit
ShyamaKrishna Upasmahe	Hanumatodi	Adi	Kriti	Sanskrit
Bhavasaagara	Dhenuka	Roopaka	Kriti	Sanskrit
Shyama Sastrivariya	Anandabhairavi	Roopaka	Kriti	Telugu
Nama Narayana	Namanarayani	Adi	Kriti	Sanskrit
Saranamemi Tyagaraja	Saranga	Roopaka	Kriti	Telugu
Venkatagiri Nayaka	Saranga	Adi	Kriti	Sanskrit
Thillana Composition	Atana	Adi	Thillana	Sanskrit
Cheliya Ro	Neelambari	Adi	Javali	Telugu
Sri Rama Ramana	Vachaspati	Roopaka Garbha Adi Taalam	GARBHA KRITI	Sanskrit
Pahimam Pahi	Harikambhoji	Jampe Garbha Adi Taalam	GARBHA KRITI	Sanskrit
Neerajakshi	Shuddha Dhanyasi	Jampe Triputa Garbha Adi Taalam	GARBHA KRITI	Sanskrit
Paramardamide	Keeravani	Adi	Kriti	Telugu

== See also ==
- List of Carnatic composers
