= Koteeswara Iyer =

Koteeswara Iyer (1869 - 1938), was a pioneer composer of Indian classical music Carnatic music. He was a grandson of Kavi Kunjara Bharati(1810–1896) attributing to a strong lineage of accomplished musicians. He was born in Nandhanur to Nagarathinam iyer who was a Sivagangai Samasthana Sangeetha Vidwan. His ancestors lived initially in Tirunelveli (Tamil Nadu) and later in Raja Hiranya Garba Thirumalai Sethupathi's village in Perungarai (Ramanathapuram). Koteeswara Iyer studied music under Poochi Srinivasa Iyengar (1860–1919) and Patnam Subramania Iyer (1845–1902). He composed mainly in the Tamil language and used the mudra Kavi Kunjara Dasan in tribute to his grandfather. While studying his BA in English Literature in Trichy, Koteeswara Iyer started performing in small Kutcheries singing Kavi Kunjara Bharathi's Skanda Puranam, Perinba Keerthanaigal. Noted devotional singers K. Somu (Somasundaram) and K. Veeramani were the grandsons of Koteeswara Iyer, and thus the great-great grandsons of Kavi Kunjara Bharathi.

== Literary works ==
- Madurai Pottramarai Pathigam
- Madurai Shanmugha Malai
- Sundareshwarar Pathigam
- KayarKanni Pathitru Pathanthathi
- Indhiya Maanmiyam

He has worked as an English Professor in Mylai Venkatramana Dispensary Ayurveda College and Mylai Sanskrit college. Later, he worked as an English translator in the Madras High Court.

He is one of the first vaggeyakara who composed songs in all the 72 melakartha ragas. His contribution to the illustration of Vivadhi Ragas is invaluable. He published his grand father's works (Kandapuranam, Azhagar Kuravanji, Perinba Keerthanaigal).

== List of Songs composed in 72 Melakartha Raagams ==
He is one of the few to have composed in all 72 Melakarta ragams. All of his 72 kritis (songs) in the Melakarta ragams are dedicated to his family deity Muruga.

To open the series of 72 kritis, he sought blessings of Lord Vinayaka by composing a prayer song dedicated to Vinayaka, Vaarana mukhava, set to Hamsadhvani ragam and Rupaka taalam.

| | Name | Ragam | Talam |
|---|---|---|---|
| 1 | Kanakaangaka | Kanakaangi | Adi |
| 2 | Tharunam Ithe | Ratnaangi | Adi |
| 3 | Maamathura | Gaanamurthi | Adi |
| 4 | Daasa Nesa | Vanaspathi | Adi |
| 5 | Nijabhakthi | Maanavathi | Rupakam |
| 6 | Va Velava | Taanaroopi | Khanda Chapu |
| 7 | Vandarul | Senavathi | Misrachaapu |
| 8 | Kalitheera | Hanumathodi | Misrachaapu |
| 9 | Karunai Kadale | Dhenuka | Aadhi |
| 10 | Irangatha | Naatakapriya | Aadhi |
| 11 | Sugha Vazhvadainthu | Kokilapriya | Rupaka |
| 12 | Naalaguthe | Roopavathi | Aadhi |
| 13 | Naadha Nilai | Gayakapriya | Kandachaapu |
| 14 | Nambinen | Vagulabaranam | Aadhi |
| 15 | Naan En Seiven | Mayamalavagowla | Aadhi |
| 16 | Kaanakankodi | Chakravaakam | Rupaka |
| 17 | Kanjam Konjum | Sooryakantham | Aadhi |
| 18 | Aalalaghatha | Haatakambari | Aadhi |
| 19 | Varam Thaarum | Jhankaradhwani | Misrachaapu |
| 20 | Ambhoruha | Natabhairavi | Rupaka |
| 21 | Velava | Keeravani | Kandachapu |
| 22 | Kanpaaraiya | Karaharapriya | Aadhi |
| 23 | Paarai | GowriManohari | Aadhi |
| 24 | Srungara Kumara | Varunapriya | Aadhi |
| 25 | Maalaginen | MaaraRanjani | Aadhi |
| 26 | Neethan Appa | Chaarukesi | Aadhi |
| 27 | Malaiyathe | Sarasangi | Rupaka |
| 28 | Neeye Ghathi | HariKambojhi | Aadhi |
| 29 | Enai Aalaiya | Shankarabharanam | Aadhi |
| 30 | Naayen | NaagaNandhini | Aadhi |
| 31 | Sambu Sathasiva | Yaagapriya | Aadhi |
| 32 | Kalankathe | Raagavardhini | Aadhi |
| 33 | Ninaimaname | Gaangeyabhooshani | Rupaka |
| 34 | Nathaanu | Vaagadheeshwari | Aadhi |
| 35 | Paramugha | Soolini | Aadhi |
| 36 | Eddaya Gathi | ChalaNaatai | Aadhi |
| 37 | Gaanamutham | Saalakam | Aadhi |
| 38 | Kanaka Mayura | Jalarnavam | Aadhi |
| 39 | Anaatha Rakshaka | JaalaVaraali | KandaChapu |
| 40 | Saami Ithe | NavaNeetham | Rupaka |
| 41 | Anjathe | Pavani | Misrachapu |
| 42 | Sadhanantha | Raghupriya | Rupaka |
| 43 | Viraivaagave | Gavambhodhi | Aadhi |
| 44 | SethiruVelan | Bhavapriya | Aadhi |
| 45 | Velane | Subhapanthuvrali | MisraChapu |
| 46 | AndharangaBakthi | Shadvidamarghini | Aadhi |
| 47 | Igapara | Suvarnaangi | Rupaka |
| 48 | Appa Murugaiyane | Divyamani | Aadhi |
| 49 | Kaarunya | Dhavalambari | Rupaka |
| 50 | Een Maname | NaamaNarayani | Aadhi |
| 51 | Ka Murugaiyya | Kaamavardhini | Aadhi |
| 52 | Saami Satha | Ramapriya | Aadhi |
| 53 | Ihame Sukham Tarum | Gamanashrama | Aadhi |
| 54 | Paramanandha | Viswambari | Rupaka |
| 55 | Kandha | Syamalangi | Misrachapu |
| 56 | Sugame Sugam | Shanmukapriya | Aadhi |
| 57 | Unnaiyallal | SimhendraMadhyamam | Aadhi |
| 58 | Manathe | Hemavathi | Rupaka |
| 59 | Kandha Bakatha | Dharmavathi | Misrchapu |
| 60 | Mohanakara | Neethimathi | Rupaka |
| 61 | Naadhasugam | Kaanthamani | Aadhi |
| 62 | GhanaNaya | Rishbhapriya | Aadhi |
| 63 | KaiKoodaVenume | Lathangi | Kandachapu |
| 64 | Igaparasooga | Vachaspathi | Rupaka |
| 65 | SadhaNanathame | MechaKalyani | Aadhi |
| 66 | SaamaGhanaLola | Chitrambhari | Misrachapu |
| 67 | VeluMayilume | Sucharithram | Rupaka |
| 68 | GhanamuthaBhanam | Jyothiswaroopini | Misrachapu |
| 69 | SookaKara | Dhathuvarthini | Aadhi |
| 70 | Thantharul | Naasikabhushani | Rupaka |
| 71 | Ka Guha | Kosalam | Rupaka |
| 72 | ArulSeiya | Rasikapriya | Aadhi |

A final closure song to close the series, traditionally called the Mangalam is also composed in Surutti set to Adi tala.

== See also ==
- List of Carnatic composers
