= Veena Kuppayyar =

Indian composer (1798–1860)

Veena Kuppayyar (1798–1860) was an exponent of Veena and a composer of Carnatic music. He was a student of the famous composer Tyagaraja. Kuppayar composed his songs in Telugu language and has left behind a number of popular kritis. His son, Tiruvottriyur Tyagayyar, was also a famous musician who composed many varnam-s which have remained popular into the 21st C.

== Early life ==
Veena Kuppayya was born in a Tamil Brahmin family in Tiruvottiyur, near Chennai. His father Sambamoorti Sastri was a famous vocalist as well as a veena player. Kuppayyar had his initial training from his father. Later he continued his musical training under Tyagaraja and learnt the art of music composition from him. Following the steps of his guru, Kuppaiyer has composed two groups of Pancharathnams – Kālahasti Pancharathna kritis and Vénkatésha Pancharathna kritis. The Panchrathna kritis are in Telugu and bears his nom de plume “Gópāla-dāsa” – his family deity, Sri Venugopala Swamy. These Panchrathna kritis also have been bedecked with beautiful Chittaswarams - solfa passages.

Kuppayyar later moved to Chennai and sought the patronage of the local ruler Kovur Sundara Mudaliar. Kuppayyar trained a lot of disciples, who carried forward the legacy of Tyagaraja, helping to spread his krithis. Veena Kuppayar was a talented veena player. He also learnt the violin, a new instrument to Carnatic Music at that time. He composed many varnams and krithis in particular. The most famous varnam was Sami Ninne in Shankarabharanam. When he was in his height of composing, he received the title of Asthana Vidwan.

== Compositions ==
Composition	Raga	Tala	Type	Language
Koniyadina Na Pai Kopamu Seyanera Gadu	Kambhoji	Adi	Kriti	Telugu
Vinayaka Ninu Vina Brocutaku Verevaru Ra	Hamsadhwani	Adi	Kriti	Telugu
Nā Morālakinchi	Dhanyasi	Rupaka	Kriti	Telugu
Sami Ninne Kori	Sankarabharanam	Adi	Varnam	Telugu
Intha Chalamu Jesithe	Begada	Adi	Varnam	Telugu
Mammu bróchu	Simhendramadhyamam	Adi	Vénkatésha Pancharathna kriti	Telugu
Nannu bróva neeku yóchana	Mukhari	Adi	Vénkatésha Pancharathna kriti	Telugu
Sarójāksha nī padamulané	Saveri	Adi	Vénkatésha Pancharathna kriti	Telugu
Nīvédikkani né nentó	Darbar	Adi	Vénkatésha Pancharathna kriti	Telugu
Bāgumīraganu nātó	Sankarabharanam	Adi	Vénkatésha Pancharathna kriti	Telugu

== See also ==
- List of Carnatic composers
