= Neelakanta Sivan =

Neelakanta Sivan (1839–1900) was an Indian composer of Carnatic music. Although he did not receive any formal musical training, his compositions exhibit deep technical brilliance. Neelakanta Sivan was born in 1839 at Vadiveeswaram, a part of Nagercoil, he stayed at Padmanabhapuram, the capital of the old Travancore. His father, Subramanya Iyer, was an official in Neelakantaswamy temple at Padmanabhapuram. His mother was Alagammal.

He worked as a village magistrate for a few years and left this profession to take up religious practices.

The songs Sambo Mahadeva Saranam (raga Bowli); Ananda nadamaaduvaar Thillai ambalam thannil (Purvikalyani); Enraikku Sivakirupai varumo (Mukhari) Enna vanthalum naan unnai marapathillai (Kambhoji); Oru naal orupozhuthakilum Sivanai ucharikka venum (Kamas); Vaa vaa kalaimathi (Shankarabharanam); Oraru Mugane (Reetigowla); Kadaikkan Paaraiyya (Darbar); and Sivanai ninai- thu thuthi paadikkol maname (Kambhoji) are very popular songs in Tamil.

== See also ==
- List of Carnatic composers
