= Subbaraya Sastri =

Indian composer

- Born: 1803; India
- Died: 1862 (aged 60)
- Occupation: composer
- Writing career
- Genre: Carnatic music

Subbaraya Sastri (1803–1862) the son and student of Syama Sastri, a renowned figure in Carnatic music. He has been influenced all the three of the musicians now acknowledged as "the Trinity of Carnatic Music": his father, and the master musicians Tyagaraja and Muthuswamy Dikshitar.

== Early life ==
Subbaraya was born in 1803 as the second son of Syama Sastri. He studied music initially from his father. Later Syama Shastri asked Tyagaraja to teach his son and sent Subbaraya to him. He also had the opportunity to learn a few krithis from Muthuswami Dikshitar. He also learnt Hindustani music from Meru Goswami, a musician of the Thanjavur palace, and from Ramadas Swami who was a recluse and who lived in Tiruvidaimarudur near Kumbakonam.

== Compositions ==
Subbaraya Shastry composed only a few krithis. Sastri composed most of his kritis in praise of the Mother Goddess.

Title	Raga
dalacinavAru	Dhanyasi
Emani nE	Mukhari
entanucu vinnavintune	Shankarabharanam
jananee ninnuvinaa	Reetigowla
mIna nayana nIvu	Darbar
nannu brOcuTaku	Hanumatodi
ninnu sEvincina	Yaddukula Kambhoji
ninnu vinA gati gAna	Kalyani
shankari neeve	Begada
shrI kamalAmbikE	Hanumatodi
vanajAsana vinuta	Shree
venkaTa shaila	Hameer Kalyani
vinA anyAyamu	Kalyani

== See also ==
- List of Carnatic composers
