= Mysore Sadashiva Rao =

Indian composer (1800–1885)

Mysore Sadashiva Rao (Mysore Sadāśiva Rāo; c. 1800 – c. 1885) or Sadasiva Rao was a notable Indian vocalist and composer of Carnatic music. He was a member of the court of the king of Mysore, Krishnaraja Wodeyar III.

== Biography ==
Very little is known about Sadashiva Rao's early days. He was born in a Marathi-speaking Deshastha Brahmin family which had settled in modern-day Andhra Pradesh. It is believed that he was employed as a clerk in his early career before he travelled to Walajahpet near Madras where he ended up training under Venkataramana Bhagavatar, a pupil of Tyagaraja (1767–1847), one of the Trinity of Carnatic Music. It is also said that Rao once met Tyagaraja when the composer travelled to Walajahpet on a pilgrimage and briefly stayed with his disciple.

Sadashiva Rao travelled with two brothers, the merchants Kopparam Chinnamuni Swamy Setty and Padda Muniswamy, to Mysore, brought Sadashiva Rao to Mysore. By the time he was 30, Rao had found a place in the Mysore Wodeyar durbar. The royal patronage coupled with wealthy admirers and disciples allowed Rao to live comfortably for the rest of his life. He was also known for his charitable work.

Notable among Rao's many disciples were Veena Seshanna, Veena Subbanna, Shamanna (of Bettadapura), Venkatesayya, and Ganjam Suryanarayana. It is known that he had a daughter whose son T. Venkata Rama Rao became an actor on the stage popularly known as "Curtain" Rama Rao.

== Compositions ==
Sadashiva Rao has composed mostly in Telugu. He went on a pilgrimage of south India and composed krithis at all the temples he visited. Sadashiva Rao used the mudra 'Sadashiva'.

Composition	Raga	Tala	Language	Audio Links
E Maguva (Varnam)	Dhanyasi	Adi	Telugu	
Inta Chouka (Varnam)	Kamavardhani	Adi	Telugu	
Vanajaksha (Varnam)	Gambhiranata	Adi	Telugu	
dEvAdi dEva nanu kAva samayamu ra	Mayamalavagowla	Adi	Telugu	
Sri Parthasarathe	Bhairavi	Khanda Triputa	Sanskrit	
Pancha Banudu Napai (Javali)	Ragamalika	Adi	Telugu	
Ninnuvina Gathi	Balahamsa	Adi	Telugu	
Evvarunnaru Nannu	Balahamsa	Adi	Telugu	
paramAdbhutamaina nI sEva	Kamas	Khanda Jati Triputa	Telugu	
Pamaruni Brova Tamasama	Kalyani	Chathurashra Jati Matya	Telugu	
sākēta-nagara-nātha	Harikambhoji	Rupaka	Sanskrit	M.S.Subbulakshmi - https://www.youtube.com/watch?v=razC37HQzvM
Narasimhudu	Kamala Manohari	Adi	Telugu	
vAcAma gOcarunDani	Atana	Adi	Telugu	Palghat Rama Bhagavatar - https://www.youtube.com/watch?v=dukmiiniiXw
gaṅgā-dhara tripura-hara śrī sāraṅgā-dhara	pūrvi kalyāṇi	rūpakaṃ	Sanskrit	
kamalā-kānta śrī kṛṣṇa-ananta susvānta (Varnam)	Lalitha	Misra Chapu	Sanskrit	
kṛpā-kara śrī guru mādhava-rāya	todi	Adi	Sanskrit	
Thyagarajaswami Vedalina	todi		Telugu	
pālaya māṃ siddhivināyaka	shuddha dhanyāsi	Misra Chapu	Sanskrit	
nannu brOcutaku inta tAmasama	Ritigowla	Rupakam	Telugu	
sāmrājya dāyakēśa	Kambhoji	Triputa	Sanskrit	
mahadēva kāñcīpurādhīśa pāhi māṃ	Surati	Rupakam	Sanskrit	
māmava saraswati vara tāmarasāsana yuvati	Margahindola	Adi	Sanskrit	
SrI kāmakOti pIthasthitE	Saveri	Adi	Sanskrit	
SrI shanmukha janaka	Shankarabharanam	Misra Triputa	Sanskrit	

== See also ==
- List of Carnatic composers

== Sources ==
- Mysore Sadāśiva Rāo, The Oxford Encyclopaedia of the Music of India. Oxford University Press. ISBN 9780195650983.
