= Sastri =

Sastri is a surname. Notable people with the surname include:

== A ==
- A. Seshayya Sastri (1828–1903), Indian administrator, Diwan of Travancore 1872–1877 and Diwan of Pudukkottai 1878–1894

== B ==
- Bapudeva Sastri (1821–1900), Indian scholar in Sanskrit and mathematics

== C ==
- C. V. Kumaraswami Sastri (1870–1934), Indian lawyer, Sanskrit scholar, justice of the Madras High Court
- C. V. Viswanatha Sastri, Indian lawyer, Sanskrit scholar, justice of the Madras High Court
- C. V. Runganada Sastri (1819–1881), Indian judge, interpreter, civil servant and polyglot
- Cheyyur Chengalvaraya Sastri, a carnatic music composer

== D ==
- Devudu Narasimha Sastri (1895–1962), Kannada writer, novelist, Sanskrit scholar, ritualist, actor and a journalist
- Devulapalli Krishnasastri (1887–1980), Telugu poet, playwright and translator
- Dhulipala Seetharama Sastri (1921–2007), Telugu film and Stage Actor

== E ==
- Eemani Sankara Sastri (1922–1987), Veena player of Carnatic music

== H ==
- H. Krishna Sastri (1870–1928), Indian epigraphist
- Hiranand Sastri (1878–1946), Indian archaeologist and epigraphist

== I ==
- Ironleg Sastri (died 2006), Telugu comedian actor from India

== J ==
- Janamaddi Hanumath Sastri (1926–2014), Indian writer and linguist

== K ==
- K. A. Nilakanta Sastri (1892–1975), Indian historian and Dravidologist

== L ==
- Lina Sastri (born 1953), Italian actress and singer

== M ==
- M. Patanjali Sastri (1889–1963), the Second Chief Justice of India
- Madhunapantula Satyanarayana Sastri (1920–1992), eminent personality in pure Telugu literature
- Mannargudi Raju Sastri (1815–1903), Hindu scholar
- Mosa Walsalam Sastri (1847–1916), Indian philosopher, social reformer, poet, musician and theologian

== N ==
- Natesa Sastri (1859–1906), noted exponent of Harikatha

== P ==
- Paidala Gurumurti Sastri, 17th century composer of Carnatic music
- Penumarthi Viswanatha Sastri (1929–1998), Telugu writer and editor
- Puranam Purushottama Sastri (1925–2010), Carnatic Musician, winner of Sangeet Natak Akademi Award

== R ==
- R. V. S. Peri Sastri, former Chief Election Commissioner of India

== S ==
- S. Srikanta Sastri (1904–1974), Indian historian, Indologist, epigraphist and polyglot
- Sarabha Sastri (1872–1904), Indian venu flute player, known as the first great Brahmin flutist
- Sivanath Sastri (1847–1919), scholar, religious reformer, educator, writer and historian
- Subbaraya Sastri (1803–1862), son and student of Syama Sastri
- Syama Sastri (1762–1827), composer of Carnatic music

== T ==
- T. Ganapati Sastri (1860–1926), Sanskrit scholar, editor of the Trivandrum Sanskrit Series
- T. R. Venkatarama Sastri (1874–1953), Indian lawyer, politician, Advocate-General for Madras Presidency 1924–1928

== V ==
- V. S. Srinivasa Sastri (1869–1946), Indian politician, administrator, educator, orator, and Indian independence activist
- Veturi Prabhakara Sastri (1888–1950), Pundit in both Sanskrit and Telugu languages
- Viswanatha Sastri (1893–1958), Carnatic music composer

== See also ==
- Sastri Nagar
- Sivanath Sastri College, undergraduate liberal arts college for women in Kolkata, India
- Seema Sastri, Telugu film starring Allari Naresh and Farjana
- Shastri
- Sastry
