= Abhogi =

Janya raga of Carnatic music

- Mela: 22nd, Kharaharapriya
- Type: Audava–Audava
- Arohanam: S R₂ G₂ M₁ D₂ Ṡ
- Avarohanam: Ṡ D₂ M₁ G₂ R₂ S
- Jeeva svaras: G₂
- Chhaya svaras: D₂
- Equivalent: Abhogi Kanada

Abhogi (Ābhōgi) is a raga in Carnatic music and has been adapted to Hindustani music. It is a pentatonic scale, an audava raga. It is a derived scale (janya raga), as it does not have all the seven swaras (musical notes). Ābhōgi has been borrowed from Carnatic music into Hindustani music and is also quite popular in the latter. In Hindustani music the raga has been classified under the Kafi thaat.

== Theory ==
Ābhōgi scale with shadjam at C

Arohanam and Avarohanam for Abhogi

The Carnatic raga Abhogi is a symmetric pentatonic scale that does not contain panchamam and nishadam. It is called an audava-audava raga, as it has 5 notes in both ascending and descending scales. Its ārohaṇa-avarohaṇa structure is as follows:

- ārohaṇa: S R₂ G₂ M₁ D₂ Ṡ (Note: Alternate notations: Hindustani: S R G̱ M D Ṡ; Western: C D E♭ F A C)
- avarohaṇa: Ṡ D₂ M₁ G₂ R₂ S (Note: Alternate notations: Hindustani: Ṡ D M G̱ R S; Western: C A F E♭ D C)

The notes used are shadjam, chathusruti rishabham, sadharana gandharam, shuddha madhyamam and chathusruthi dhaivatham. Ābhōgi is considered a janya raga of Kharaharapriya, the 22nd Melakarta raga, though it can be derived from Gourimanohari too, by dropping both panchamam and nishadam.

=== Graha bhedam ===
Graha bhedam is the step taken in keeping the relative note frequencies same, while shifting the shadjam to another note in the rāgam. Abhogi's notes, when shifted using Graha bhedam, yields another pentatonic rāgam, Valaji. For more details and illustration of this concept refer Graha bhedam on Ābhōgi.

According to P.Moutal, the raga Kalavati is a transposition of Abhogi.

=== Scale similarities ===
- Sriranjani is a rāgam which has kaishiki nishadam in both ascending and descending scales in addition to the notes in Ābhōgi. Its ārohaṇa-avarohaṇa structure is S R₂ G₂ M₁ D₂ N₂ Ṡ : Ṡ N₂ D₂ M₁ G₂ R₂ S
- Jayamanohari is a rāgam which is like Abhogi in ascending scale and like Sriranjani is descending scale. Its ārohaṇa-avarohaṇa structure is S R₂ G₂ M₁ D₂ Ṡ: Ṡ N₂ D₂ M₁ G₂ R₂ S

== Notable compositions ==
Abhogi is a raga used for compositions in a medium to fast tempo. It has been used by many composers in classical music and film music. Notable traditional compositions in Abhogi include:

- Nannu Brova Nee Kinta Tāmasamā and Manasu Nilpa in Adi tala and Neelakantha Niranjana in Rupaka tala by Thyagaraja
- Śri Lakṣhmi varāham by Muthuswami Dikshitar
- Sabhāpatikku veru daivam, in Rupaka tala by Gopalakrishna Bharati
- Neekepudu in Khanḍa Tripuṭa tala by Mysore Sadashiva Rao
- Sri Mahaganapathe by N S Ramachandran

== In Hindustani music ==
Abhogi Kanada
- Thaat: Kafi
- Type: Audava–Audava
- Time of day: Early night, 9–12
- Arohana: S R G̱ M D Ṡ
- Avarohana: Ṡ D M G̱ M R S; Ṡ D M G̱ R S
- Vadi: S
- Samavadi: M
- Synonym: Abhogi
- Similar: Bageshri

The Carnatic raga was incorporated relatively recently into Hindustani classical music where it is known as Abhogi Kanada (IAST: Abhogi Kānaḍā) or simply, Abhogi. The Kanada indicates its origin as a member of the Kanada group. Abhogi Kanada is assigned to the Kafi thaat.

The Carnatic and Hindustani Abhogis have almost identical arohanas and avarohanas. However, one major differences is that the Carnatic raga uses the Kanada vakra (out of sequence) phrase G₂ M₁ R₂ S (Note: Alternate notations: Hindustani: G̱ M R S; Western: E♭ F D C) in a straight manner.

=== Theory ===
Pa and Ni are omitted. Also Re is often omitted in ascent. Flat Ga is often approached from Ma in ascent and has a slight oscillation to show the typical Kanada.

- Arohana (order of ascending notes in the scale): S R G̱ M D Ṡ (Note: Alternate notations: Carnatic: S R₂ G₂ M₁ D₂ Ṡ; Western: C D E♭ F A C)
- Avarohana (order of descending notes in the scale): Ṡ D M G̱ R S (Note: Alternate notations: Carnatic: Ṡ D₂ M₁ G₂ R₂ S; Western: C A F E♭ D C) or Ṡ D M G̱ R S (Note: Alternate notations: Carnatic: Ṡ D₂ M₁ G₂ R₂ S; Western: C A F E♭ D C)

Related ragas: Bageshree. However, Bageshree also includes flat Ni and a limited use of Pa, which gives a different flavour.

== Compositions ==
Hindustani compositions of note in Abhogi Kanada include:

- Par gaya chahai sab koi in Ektal by Raidas
- Jayati siri radhike in Jhaptal by Gadadhar Bhatt
- Ek barajori kare saiyya in Jhumratal

== See also ==
- List of Film Songs based on Ragas

== Sources ==
- Bor, Joep; Rao, Suvarnalata (1999). The Raga Guide: A Survey of 74 Hindustani Ragas. Nimbus Records with Rotterdam Conservatory of Music. p. 16. ISBN 978-0-9543976-0-9.
- Ābhōgi Rāga (Kar), The Oxford Encyclopaedia of the Music of India. Oxford University Press. 2011. ISBN 978-0-19-565098-3.
- Abhogi Kānaḍā Rāga (Hin), The Oxford Encyclopaedia of the Music of India. Oxford University Press. 2011. doi:10.1093/acref/9780195650983.001.0001. ISBN 978-0-19-565098-3.
- Moutal, Patrick (1991), Hindustāni Rāga-s Index, New Delhi: Munshiram Manoharlal Publishers Pvt Ltd, ISBN 81-215-0525-7
