= Dharmapuri Subbarayar =

Dharmapuri Jaavali Subbarayar was a composer of Carnatic music who lived during the nineteenth century. He composed mainly in the Telugu language and used Dharmapuri, the name of his birthplace and a city in Tamil Nadu, as his mudra.

== Compositions ==
Composition	Raga	Tala	Type	Language
parulanna mAta	Kapi	Adi	Javali	Telugu
sakhi prAna	Senchurutti	Adi	Javali	Telugu
mArubAri	Khamas	Adi	Javali	Telugu
kommarO vanikentha biguvE	Khamas	Adi	Javali	Telugu

== See also ==
- List of Carnatic composers
