= Cheyyur (disambiguation) =

Cheyyur is a town in Tamil Nadu, India.

Cheyyur may also refer to:

- Cheyyur taluk, a taluk (subdivision) of Chengalpattu district in Tamil Nadu
- Cheyyur (state assembly constituency), a state assembly constituency in Tamil Nadu
- Cheyyur Chengalvaraya Sastri, an Indian Carnatic music composer .
