= Ghanam Krishna Iyer =

Ghanam Krishna Iyer (1790–1854) was a composer of Carnatic music and was famous for his padams. Padams are expressive songs of three or more stanzas, used generally as an accompaniment to classical dance. Krishna Iyer was a student of the famous composer, Pacchimiriam Adiyappa. He was also influenced by Saint Tyagaraja and Gopalakrishna Bharathi. The title Ghanam, which associated with music means 'deep' or 'grand', relates to his style of singing.

He met Tyagaraja and composed and sang his composition, Summa Summa Varuguma Sugam in Raga Atana. His Mudras included Muttukumaara and Velar.

== See also ==
- List of Carnatic composers
