= Tiruvarur Ramaswami Pillai =

Indian composer

Ramaswami Pillai (1798–1852) was an Indian Carnatic music composer. He was born in Thiruvarur to Kamala Tyagesam Pillai and Vasantammal, a family of Nayinar Adiyar associated with the Thyagaraja Temple at Thiruvarur. Ramaswami Pillai blossomed into a composer and a penta-linguist and retired to Vaitheeswaran Koil where he spent the last days of his life. He lived up to the age of 53. His sister, Saraswati was also an accomplished musician who played the Veena and a vocalist.

== Works ==
Ramaswami Pillai has around 52 compositions to his credit including Varnams and Kritis, and his Mudra was Vedapuri or Vedapureesa after one of the names of Vaidhisvaran koil. Some of his compositions include:

- Vanita ninne(Varnam) – Bhairavi
- Roopamu Joochi(Varnam) – Hanumatodi (Disuputed whether the composition is of Ramaswami Pillai or Muthuswami Dikshitar)
- Jagadisvari Kripai – Mohanam
- Ekkalattilum – Purvikalyani
- Na meeda – Saurashtra
- Sri Kamakshi Katakshi – Vasantha
- Idhu Nalla Samayama – Kalyani
