= Paidala Gurumurti Sastri =

Composer

Gurumurti Sastri was a composer of Carnatic music who lived during the 18th century in the village of Kayatar in Tirunelveli district of Tamil Nadu.

== Family ==
His family name was Paidala. He learnt music from Venkatasubbayya. He was well-versed in both Sangitha and Sahitya. He was felicitated Madras.

== Geetams ==
Gurumurti Sastri composed many Geetams, or short songs illustrating Janaka (means parent, also known as Melakarta) and Janya ragas. He composed around 1000 gitas which earned him the name ' Veyi Gitala Gurumurti Sastri' . He was famous for his technical knowledge of the science of Ragas. His mudra (signature) was Gurumurthi.

The Geetams he composed in Sanskrit were lost to time. Here are a few that sustained the test of time:

- Kamsaasura-Lakshana Geetham in Sahana
- Janaki Ramanathe in Neelambari
- Rere Sri Ramachandra in Arabhi
- Arabhi Raga Lakshanam Vachmi-Lakshana Geetam in Arabhi
- Mandhara Dhare in Kamboji
- Pahi Sri Ramachandra in Ananda Bhairavi
- Meenakshi Jaya Kamakshi in Shree
- Gana Vidya Durandhara in Nattai (extolling the greatness of his Guru Sonti Venkatasubbayya)

Here are some Kritis of his:

- Neerajanayana in Dhanyasi
- Sadapathim in Mohanam
- Sphurathuthe Charana in Devagandhari
