= Pacchimiriam Adiyappa =

Court musician

Pacchimiriam Adiappayya was a famous court musician at the Maratha kingdom of Thanjavur in the 18th century. He belongs to Kannada Madhwa Brahmin community. Famous musicians Veena Venkatamaramana Das of Vijayanagaram and Veena Seshanna of Mysore are his descendants. He was a composer of Carnatic music. Some of his famous disciples were Syama Sastri (1762-1827), one of the Trinity of Carnatic composers, and Ghanam Krishna Iyer. Three of his compositions, all in the Telugu language, survive today in the 21st C, two of them being kritis and one a varnam.

Pacchimiriam Adiappayya's most famous composition is the varnam Viriboni in Bhairavi ragam.

== See also ==
- List of Carnatic composers
