= Pattabhiramayya =

Pattabhiramayya was a nineteenth-century composer of Carnatic music. He composed in Tamil, Telugu and Kannada languages. He was born in the village of Tiruppanandal near Kumbakonam in Tamil Nadu, India.

He composed many songs in the style of javalis which are of a romantic nature. He used Garbhapurisha as one of his mudras.

== See also ==
- List of Carnatic composers
