= Hamsanandi =

Janya raga of Carnatic music

- Arohanam: S R₁ G₃ M₂ D₂ N₃ Ṡ
- Avarohanam: Ṡ N₃ D₂ M₂ G₃ R₁ S

Hamsanandi (pronounced hamsānandi) is a rāgam in Carnatic music (musical scale of South Indian classical music). It is a hexatonic scale (shadava rāgam, which means "of 6"). It is a derived scale (janya rāgam), as it does not have all the seven swaras (musical notes). Hamsanandi is a janya rāgam of Gamanashrama, the 53rd Melakarta rāgam. It has only the invariant panchamam missing from its parent scale, Gamanashrama, like Shree ranjani.

Sohni raga in Hindustani classical music that belongs to the Marwa thaat resembles Hamsanandi.

== Structure and Lakshana ==
Hamsanandi scale with shadjam at C

Hamsanandi is a symmetric scale that does not contain panchamam. It is called a shadava-shadava rāgam, in Carnatic music classification (as it has 6 notes in both ascending and descending scales). Its ārohaṇa-avarohaṇa structure is as follows (see swaras in Carnatic music for details on below notation and terms):

- ārohaṇa : S R₁ G₃ M₂ D₂ N₃ Ṡ (Note: Alternate notations: Hindustani: S Ṟ G M̄ D N Ṡ; Western: C D♭ E F♯ A B C)
- avarohaṇa : Ṡ N₃ D₂ M₂ G₃ R₁ S (Note: Alternate notations: Hindustani: Ṡ N D M̄ G Ṟ S; Western: C B A F♯ E D♭ C)

This scale uses the notes shadjam, shuddha rishabham, antara gandharam, prati madhyamam, chathusruthi dhaivatham and kakali nishadam.
