= Papanasa Mudaliar =

Papanasa Mudaliyar (1650–1725) belonged to tondaimandalam thuluva Vellala community .He was born in Tiruvarur and was known as Arooran. he was an early Carnatic music composer who lived in what is now Tamil Nadu, India. Among his compositions mukattai kAttiya in Bhairavi ragam and nadamAdittirintha in Kambhoji ragam are well known. The latter composition is an example of the Nindastuti style in musical compositions wherein the superficial meaning of the song seems to ridicule the deity involved. Later Tyagaraja followed this in songs like Adigi sukhamu in Madhyamavathi raga.
