= Poochi Srinivasa Iyengar =

Indian singer and composer

Poochi Srinivasa Iyengar (1860–1919), whose real name was Ramanathapuram Srinivasa Iyengar, was a singer and composer of Carnatic music.

== Early life ==
He was born in Ramanathapuram in Tamil Nadu on August 16, 1860. He studied music under Patnam Subramania Iyer (1845 - 1902), a singer of Carnatic music and came in the sishya parampara of Saint Thyagaraja. He had a large number of disciples, of whom the most popular was Ariyakudi Ramanuja Iyengar. He composed over 100 songs and used the mudra Srinivasa in his compositions. He died on July 20, 1919.

"The appellation 'Poochi'(பூச்சி) meaning 'insect' is rather strange. There are surmises that his raga elaboration resembled the humming of a beetle, or that he used to apply sandal paste on his body and the Tamil word 'Poochu' had become 'Poochi', or that he was known for his tireless activity like the bee; but the real reason is not known.

== Compositions ==
Composition	Raga	Tala	Type	Language	Other Info	Audio Links
ninnu kOri yunnAnu rA nikhila lOka nAyakA	Mohana	Adi	Tana Varnam	Telugu		Rama Varma - https://www.youtube.com/watch?v=dq7uRb0iZdU/
Vanajakshiro	Kalyani	Adi Talam	Varnam	Telugu		
nera nammithi naiyanithya muga ninnu	Kanada	Ata	Ata Talam Varnam	Telugu		
sAmajavaradA	suddha sAvEri		kriti	Telugu		
sadguru svAmiki	Ritigowlai		kriti	Telugu	Kriti on Tyagaraja	
saragu na pAlimpa samayamu rA nIku	Kedaragaula	Adi	Kriti	Telugu		
parama pAvana rAmA pApa vimOcanA	Purvi Kalyani	Adi	Kriti	Telugu		Palghat Srirama Bhagavatar - https://www.youtube.com/watch?v=a4yfVgCcAAA/
shrI raghukula nidhim	Huseni	Adi	Kriti	Telugu		
Sami Ninne	Hindolam	Adi Talam	Varnam	Telugu		
Sami Ninne	Narayani	Adi Talam	Varnam	Telugu		Poochchi Iyengar composed a varnam starting 'saami ninne' in two raaga-s. Search for audio link for a rendition in Narayani continues Lyrics at : https://karnatik.com/c26174.shtml
Nee Padamule Gathiyani	Navarasa Kannada	Adi Talam	Krithi	Telugu		

== See also ==
- List of Carnatic composers
