= Pallavi Seshayyar =

Pallavi Seshayyer (1842–1909) was a composer of Carnatic music, who followed the traditions of the famous composer Tyagaraja. Seshayyar was a singer in the court of the king of Mysore. As a singer, he was an expert of the techniques of Ragam-Thanam-Pallavi, a unique style of singing Carnatic music. This expertise gave him his epithet Pallavi Seshayyar. He could also compose exploiting rare Ragas.

Seshayyar was born in Neykkarapatti, a village near Salem, Tamil Nadu. His father was also a student of Tyagaraja. Seshayyar learnt many of the songs composed by Tyagaraja from his father.

Later in life Seshayyar moved to Madras and taught a number of students. Seshayyar mainly composed in Sanskrit and Telugu.

== See also ==
- List of Carnatic composers
