= Kalyani Varadarajan =

Indian musician

Kalyani Varadarajan (8 October 1923 – 28 October 2003), commonly known as Kalyani, was one of Carnatic music's famous twentieth-century composers. She created carnatic compositions in all 72 melakarta ragas, besides scores of janya ragas.

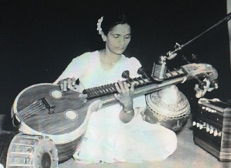
Kalyani Varadarajan playing veena some time during the 1950s

== Early life ==
Kalyani Varadarajan was born to Sriman Nadadoor Ammal Narasimhachariar and Srimati Singarammal. Her father was a big scholar in Telugu and Sanskrit languages, who served as a teacher, headmaster and finally as an educational inspector, while her mother was a musician. Kalyani had a taste to write and compose songs since a young age, and she underwent vocal and Veena training, first under her mother and later under other able gurus. Thereafter, she learnt to play Violin. She had her debut in Veena performance at the age of 16 in 1942.

== List of Compositions ==
| Serial No. | Composition | Format | Raga | Language | Talam | In Praise of Deity |
|---|---|---|---|---|---|---|
| 1 | pāhi māṃ śrī | Varnam | śubhapantuvarāli | Sanskrit | Ādi | |
| 2 | rāja-rājēśwari | Pada Varnam | vācaspati | Sanskrit | Ādi | |
| 3 | Thom Thomena | Kirtanai | Vasanta | Tamil | Ādi | |
| 4 | Vāṇi vīṇā-pāṇi | Kirtanai | Revathi | Telugu | Ādi | |
| 5 | Aparṇā Pārvati | Kirtanai | Nalinakānti | Sanskrit | Rūpakam | |
| 6 | Mari Mari Hari Nām | Kirtanai | Hamir Kalyāni | Sanskrit | Ādi | |
| 7 | Abhēstadāyini | Kirtanai | Kēravāni | Sanskrit | Ādi | |
| 8 | Sri Amruta Phalāmbike | Kirtanai | Chakravākam | Sanskrit | Triputai | |
| 9 | Kan Kanda Daivam | Kirtanai | Bhūshāvali | Tamil | Ādi | |
| 10 | Mahāmburasi | Kirtanai | Bilahari | Sanskrit | Ādi | |
| 11 | Kanikarambutho | Kirtanai | Bhavāni | Sanskrit | Ādi | |
| 12 | Sri Nārasimham | Kirtanai | Sahānā | Sanskrit | Kanda Chāpu | |
| 13 | Bhava Kadal | Kirtanai | Bānu Kēravāni | Tamil | Ādi | |
| 14 | Sri Bhuvaneshwari | Kirtanai | Sivaranjani | Sanskrit | Ādi | |
| 15 | Kanutchallagā | Kirtanai | Kanakāngi | Telugu | Ādi | |
| 16 | Shānta Durgā Devi | Kirtanai | Madhukons | Sanskrit | Ādi | |
| 17 | Nāma Rasa Mānave | Kirtanai | Kharaharapriyā | Sanskrit | Ādi | |
| 18 | Payorāsi Bale | Kirtanai | Dwijāvanti | Sanskrit | Misra Chāpu | |
| 19 | Kshamādi Guna | Kirtanai | Lalithā | Sanskrit | Ādi | |
| 20 | Arnava Suthām | Kirtanai | Begadā | Sanskrit | Ādi | |
| 21 | Sampath Pradè | Kirtanai | Kalyāni | Sanskrit | Ādi | |
| 22 | Bhajāmyaham | Kirtanai | Dharmavati | Sanskrit | Rūpakam | |
| 23 | Vainateya Vāhanam | Kirtanai | Mohanam | Sanskrit | Ādi | |
| 24 | Ishta Devatha | Kirtanai | Bhūpāĺam | Sanskrit | Ādi | |
| 25 | Muruga Vā | Kirtanai | Kāmboji | Tamil | Ādi | |
| 26 | Sri Tulasi Nētimati | Kirtanai | Nētimati | Sanskrit | Rūpakam | |
| 27 | Sapthagirèsam | Kirtanai | Kānadā | Sanskrit | Ādi | |
| 28 | Chandikeshwari | Kirtanai | Ābhogi | Sanskrit | Ādi | |
| 29 | Mahā Balavantā Sri Hanumantā | Kirtanai | Ārabi | Sanskrit | Ādi | |
| 30 | Sāgarasutam | Kirtanai | Kalyānavasantham | Sanskrit | Ādi | |
| 31 | Vananidhi Kanyakām | Kirtanai | Manoranjani | Sanskrit | Ādi | |
| 32 | Sangētha Sâragnyā | Kirtanai | Sāveri | Sanskrit | Kanda Châpu | |
| 33 | Mahā Venkateshwarā | Kirtanai | Bahudāri | Sanskrit | Ādi | |
| 34 | Pancha Mukha Māruti | Kirtanai | Behāg | Sanskrit | Ādi | |
| 35 | Mānidhi Kāntaku | Kirtanai | Kālyani | Sanskrit | Ādi | |
| 36 | Nannu Brochu Bhāramu | Kirtanai | Nāttai Kuranji | Telugu | Ādi | |
| 37 | Kanaka Simham | Kirtanai | Kāpi | Sanskrit | Ādi | |
| 38 | Bhaja Mânasa | Kirtanai | Mukhari | Sanskrit | Ādi | |
| 39 | Amulya Varade | Kirtanai | Deva Gāndhāri | Sanskrit | Ādi | |
| 40 | Bāla Tripura Sundari | Kirtanai | Mandāri | Sanskrit | Ādi | |
| 41 | Amruta Pāname | Kirtanai | Sāranga | Telugu | Ādi | |
| 42 | Sudhā Sahajām | Kirtanai | Surati | Sanskrit | Ādi | |
| 43 | Stava Vārdita Vikramà | Kirtanai | Shanmukhapriyā | Sanskrit | Rūpakam | |
| 44 | Navaratna Vilasa | Kirtanai | Malayamārutham | Sanskrit | Jampai | |
| 45 | Mahitātma Sevite | Kirtanai | Pantuvarāli | Sanskrit | Jampai | |
| 46 | Vikasita Pankaja | Kirtanai | Desh | Telugu | Ādi - Tisrai Nadai | |
| 47 | Shauriyuro Vasini | Kirtanai | Hamsānandi | Sanskrit | Ādi | |
| 48 | Santoshi Māta | Kirtanai | Madhyamāvati | Telugu | Ādi | |
| 49 | Raghudvaha Dāsa | Kirtanai | Ānanda Bhairavi | Sanskrit | Ādi | |
| 50 | Pāmarajana Pālini | Kirtanai | Suddha Bangālā | Sanskrit | Rūpakam | |
| 51 | Pādodhi Kanyakām | Kirtanai | Darbāri Kānada | Sanskrit | Ādi | |
| 52 | Chidānandadam Srinivāsam | Kirtanai | Jonpuri | Sanskrit | Ādi | |
| 53 | Amburuhānanā | Kirtanai | Brindavana Sārang | Sanskrit | Ādi | |
| 54 | Gānakalā Viduni | Kirtanai | Kedāragoula | Sanskrit | Ādi | |
| 55 | Nāma Pāname Jèvanamu | Kirtanai | Shankarābharanam | Telugu | Ādi | |
| 56 | Ambujāsyām Sri Chāmundeshwari | Kirtanai | Kalyāni | Sanskrit | Ādi | |
| 57 | Sanāthani Sri Sunādavinodini | Kirtanai | Sunādavinodini | Sanskrit | Rūpakam | |
| 58 | Vandeham Sri Gandhavahasutam | Kirtanai | Pūrvi Kalyāni | Sanskrit | Ādi | |
| 59 | Vasudevasutām | Kirtanai | Nāsikābhūshini | Sanskrit | Ādi | |
| 60 | Sri Yuvati Priyam Chintayeham | Kirtanai | Chārukesi | Sanskrit | Ādi | |
| 61 | Shārade Namaste | Kirtanai | Sāramati | Sanskrit | Rūpakam | |
| 62 | Saraswati Sugunavati Samasta Vidhyādhipati | Kirtanai | Saraswati | Sanskrit | Rūpakam | |
| 63 | Vana Nidhi Kanya Varam | Kirtanai | Chandrakons | Sanskrit | Rūpakam | |
| 64 | Chintayeham | Kirtanai | Ābhogi | Sanskrit | Rūpakam | |
| 65 | Sari Evvare Shri Mànini | Kirtanai | Kokilapriyā | Sanskrit | Ādi | |
| 66 | Shwetāmbari Vāni | Kirtanai | Vāchaspati | Sanskrit | Ādi | |
| 67 | Vārārkaro Bhava | Kirtanai | Pūrvi Kalyāni | Sanskrit | Khanda Jampai | |
| 68 | Suruchira Rūpini | Kirtanai | Gaurimanohari | Sanskrit | Ādi | |
| 69 | Krupadātā Nēve | Kirtanai | Malahari | Sanskrit | Ādi | |
| 70 | Vachanambujamula | Kirtanai | Dharmavati | Sanskrit | Ādi | |
| 71 | Hariguna Gāname | Kirtanai | Brāmarakusumam | Sanskrit | Ādi | |
| 72 | Mahimārnava | Kirtanai | Shubhapantuvarāli | Sanskrit | Ādi | |
| 73 | Mānasa Harināmrutha | Kirtanai | Senjuruti | Sanskrit | Ādi | |
| 74 | Marugelane | Kirtanai | Bhāgesri | Sanskrit | Ādi | |
| 75 | Thāmarasa Dhāma | Kirtanai | Hanuma Todi | Sanskrit | Khanda Jampai | |
| 76 | Haripada Mahimanu | Kirtanai | Rishabhapriyā | Telugu | Adi | |
| 77 | Amba Ninnu Maruvane | Kirtanai | Rūpavati | Telugu | Rūpakam | |
| 78 | Sarasijavana Vâsini | Kirtanai | Hamsadhwani | Sanskrit | Rūpakam | |
| 79 | Vanajāyatha | Kirtanai | Khamās | Sanskrit | Ādi | |
| 80 | Aghātha Nikudāre | Kirtanai | Kharaharapriyā | Telugu | Rūpakam | |
| 81 | Sadā Sāradāmbhaām | Kirtanai | Suddha Sāveri | Sanskrit | Ādi | |
| 82 | Kāminchi Koluchenu | Kirtanai | Rathanāngi | Telugu | Rūpakam | |
| 83 | Nālgumunula Vāni Kalathri | Kirtanai | Gānamūrti | Telugu | Ādi | |
| 84 | Vananidhi Sambhave | Kirtanai | Vanaspati | Sanskrit | Khanda Chāpu | |
| 85 | Mānavathi Apamāna Dānarathe | Kirtanai | Mānavati | Sanskrit | Ādi | |
| 86 | Bhajāmyaham Ramāsakham | Kirtanai | Tānarūpi | Sanskrit | Rūpakam | |
| 87 | Nēve Aligithe | Kirtanai | Senāpati | Telugu | Ādi | |
| 88 | Karunatho Mēyinta | Kirtanai | Hanuma Todi | Telugu | Ādi | |
| 89 | Nanda Bāla | Kirtanai | Dhenukā | Sanskrit | Ādi | |
| 90 | Pathuvedam Pūnda Nātakapriyane | Kirtanai | Nātakapriyā | Tamil | Ādi | |
| 91 | Bhāshavathi Rūpavathi | Kirtanai | Rūpavati | Sanskrit | Rūpakam | |
| 92 | Gāyakapriye | Kirtanai | Gāyakapriyā | Sanskrit | Ādi | |
| 93 | Chārukesi Chidambareswari | Kirtanai | Chārukesi | Sanskrit | Ādi | |
| 94 | Sarasāngi Saraswathi | Kirtanai | Sarasāngi | Sanskrit | Rūpakam | |
| 95 | Vēna Vādana Tatparam | Kirtanai | Hari Kāmboji | Sanskrit | Ādi | |
| 96 | Kānalnērai Kandodum | Kirtanai | Shankarābharanam | Tamil | Ādi | |
| 97 | Nāgānandini Râgamodini | Kirtanai | Nāgānandini | Sanskrit | Ādi | |
| 98 | Yāgapriya Rāgāna Pādudu | Kirtanai | Yāgapriya | Tamil | Ādi | |
| 99 | Bangāru Vesikapai | Kirtanai | Rāgavardhini | Telugu | Jhampai | |
| 100 | Pravimalasu Gunābhirâme | Kirtanai | Gāngeya Bhūshani | Sanskrit | Ādi | |
| 101 | Vinathasādare Visālākshi | Kirtanai | Gāyakapriyā | Sanskrit | Ādi | |
| 102 | Marugelane | Kirtanai | Māyāmālavagaulā | Telugu | Ādi | |
| 103 | Koti Sūryakānthi | Kirtanai | Sūryakāntham | Sanskrit | Rūpakam | |
| 104 | Hātakāmbari Kaumāri | Kirtanai | Hātakāmbari | Sanskrit | Ādi | |
| 105 | Jhankāra Sruthi Seyave | Kirtanai | Jhankāradhwani | Tamil | Ādi | |
| 106 | Ruňametula Thērchukondune | Kirtanai | Nathabhairavi | Telugu | Ādi | |
| 107 | Soundaryalahari Kēravâni | Kirtanai | Kēravāni | Sanskrit | Ādi | |
| 108 | Nāmāmrutha Rasika | Kirtanai | Kharaharapriyā | Tamil | Ādi | |
| 109 | Bhaktasādaranēti Gaurave | Kirtanai | Gaurimanohari | Sanskrit | Ādi | |
| 110 | Māraranjani Srimani | Kirtanai | Māraranjani | Sanskrit | Ādi | |
| 111 | Paňdari Yendre Orudaram Sonnāl | Kirtanai | Athāňā | Tamil | Ādi | |
| 112 | Thandanālatho Poddu Pūrchaleka | Kirtanai | Mohanam | Telugu | Ādi | |
| 113 | Darsanamuche Pāvanamâiye | Kirtanai | Sindhu Bhairavi | Telugu | Ādi | |
| 114 | Mahonnathi Nidhe | Kirtanai | Khamās | Sanskrit | Ādi | |
| 115 | Vāhēkrutha Harya Kshemāĺām | Kirtanai | Bilahari | Sanskrit | Ādi | |
| 116 | Khanaghangumau Prâňamundaga | Kirtanai | Bindumālini | Telugu | Châpu | |
| 117 | Sānthivaradhānēm Samsraye | Kirtanai | Varāli | Sanskrit | Ādi | |
| 118 | Sadānugrahaparām Sâradâm | Kirtanai | Sāranga | Sanskrit | Ādi | |
| 119 | Kalānilayām Kalaye | Kirtanai | Hindoĺam | Sanskrit | Misra Châpu | |
| 120 | Magalahārathide Nēku | Kirtanai | Pantuvarāĺi | Telugu | Ādi | |
| 121 | Yoganrusimha Padāmbuja Brunga | Kirtanai | Vasanthā | Sanskrit | Misra Châpu | |
| 122 | Nēradhisute Nityānande | Kirtanai | Dhenukā | Sanskrit | Ādi | |
| 123 | Nidhikāntha Nē Sāti Evvare | Kirtanai | Ranjani | Telugu | Ādi | |
| 124 | Sri Nrusimha Nāyike | Kirtanai | Shankarābharaňam | Sanskrit | Rūpakam | |
| 125 | Karuňāmruta Varshini | Kirtanai | Maňi Rangu | Sanskrit | Ādi | |
| 126 | Sangētam Bhoja | Kirtanai | Shubhapantuvarāli | Sanskrit | Ādi | |
| 127 | Mātā Pitā Gurudeva | Kirtanai | Gurupriya | Sanskrit | Ādi | |
| 128 | Navagraha Daivamula | Kirtanai | Ābheri | Telugu | Ādi | |
| 129 | Hātaka Garbuni | Kirtanai | Saraswati | Telugu | Ādi | |
| 130 | Sukhi Intuna | Kirtanai | Gāngeya Bhūshani | Telugu | Ādi | |
| 131 | Sarasijodāru Sakhi | Kirtanai | Hamsadhwani | Telugu | Kanda Châpu | |
| 132 | Mahā Hema Kesari | Kirtanai | Chāyāsindhu | Telugu | Rūpakam | |
| 133 | Sanēswaram | Kirtanai | Bhogi | Sanskrit | Rūpakam | |
| 134 | Sāramati Saraswati | Kirtanai | Sāramati | Sanskrit | Ādi | |
| 135 | Gatikagya | Kirtanai | Kāmbodhi | Sanskrit | Ādi | |
| 136 | Kapālēshwaram | Kirtanai | Bouĺi | Sanskrit | Ādi | |
| 137 | Tândava Priyā | Kirtanai | Valaji | Sanskrit | Ādi | |
| 138 | Sadā Nē Pādamule | Kirtanai | Aťānā | Telugu | Ādi | |
| 139 | Suratarūkriya | Kirtanai | Sindhu Bhairavi | Sanskrit | Ādi | |
| 140 | Hari Guna Gāname | Kirtanai | Madhuvanti | Sanskrit | Ādi | |
| 141 | Kshānti Vardhani | Kirtanai | Varāĺi | Sanskrit | Ādi | |
| 142 | Sthiramugā | Kirtanai | Hindoĺam | Sanskrit | Ādi | |
| 143 | Sarigādhammā | Kirtanai | Jyotiswarūpini | Sanskrit | Ādi | |
| 144 | Yoga Nrusimha | Kirtanai | Saurāshtram | Sanskrit | Misra Chāpu | |
| 145 | Sādaramugā Nannu | Kirtanai | Vishwambari | Telugu | Khanda Jampai | |
| 146 | Sarivārilo Nannu Bhâsvare | Kirtanai | Subhapantuvarāli | Telugu | Ādi | |
| 147 | Latāngi Sarveshwari Varalakshmi | Kirtanai | Latāngi | Telugu | Ādi | |
| 148 | Vrushāchalesham Namāmyaham | Kirtanai | Bŗndavani | Sanskrit | Ādi | |
| 149 | Vananidhi Shubhaga Shyāmalām | Kirtanai | Sārangā | Sanskrit | Ādi | |
| 150 | Pannagagirēsham Āshraye | Kirtanai | Sahānā | Sanskrit | Ādi | |
| 151 | Gānamūrti Naǐināytha Nèthri | Kirtanai | Gānamūrthi | Telugu | Ādi | |
| 152 | Mānavati Asamāna Dānaratha | Kirtanai | Mānavati | Sanskrit | Ādi | |
| 153 | Sushobhana Phalade Sharade Vidiyuvate | Kirtanai | Nathabhairavi | Sanskrit | Ādi | |
