= Kavi Kunjara Bharati =

Indian composer and poet

Kavi Kunjara Bharati (1810–1896) was a Tamil poet and a composer of Carnatic music. He was born in a family with long involvement in music and scholarship.

== Ancestry ==
His ancestors belonged to Tirunelveli district. His parents lived in the village of Perungarai in Ramanathapuram district. It is said the whole village was a gift from Maharaja Ragunatha Sethupathi (1675–1670) to their family. His given name was Koteeswara Bharathi after his grandfather with the same name. His father was Subramanya Bharathi. His father and grandfather were also well known musicians as well as his maternal grandfather, Nandanur Nagabharathi. Father Subramanya Bharathi and grandfather Kotiswara Bharathi were also scholars in Tamil and Sanskrit. His parents, who were longing to have a child, prayed weekly at the Murugan temple in Kodumalur (near Perungarai) and the child was considered to be blessed by Lord Muruga.

In his early boyhood he was taught Sanskrit and Tamil and thanks to his brilliance in poetry, language skills and music, he developed an intellectual relationship with the then famous poet Madurakavi Bharathiar. One could imagine fruitful discussions among the two in the presence of their families and Koteeswara Bharthi, at the early age of 12 started composing kirtanams and prabandhas in the praise of his favourite gods Muruga, Meenakshi Sundareswarar and Subrahmanya. When he was 18, he became critically ill and at this stage, the legend says that the local deity appeared in his dreams and told him to compose songs in her praise in order to get well. The next day he found that he was feeling much stronger and full of verve. He then fulfilled the deity's wish and composed a prabandha in the name of the deity and sang it in the temple.

His most famous work, the Opera "Azhahar Kuravanji", was composed in 1840. It was first sung in a zamindar's palace in Sivaganga and soon his fame spread all over the region. He was then invited by King Gouri Vallabha of Sivaganga to present his works in the presence of the intellectual community in his palace which he did with brilliance. He was then given the title "Kavi Kunjaram" and was appointed as the "Asthana Vidwan" in his court. He was thus respected by the royal court of Sivaganga and he continued to be in the court of the later Sivaganga king "Chatrapathi Bodaguru". He is known to have composed "Vengai kummi" to commemorate the hunting prowess of the king after he killed a 16-foot tiger. The king was so pleased that he presented him with a village called "Kottangachi yendal" and was accompanied by royal presents and traveled in a royal palanquin to his village

He was later invited by the king of Ramnad to his court and was appointed as Asthana Vidwan of Ramnad, too. To fulfil the royal desire he created a collection called "Skanda purana Kirtanai" on the mystery of lord Subramanya's avatar. He was about 55 by the time the book was released. He then lived a pious and respected life in his village. There are tales of him creating a "Venba" to provoke rainfall in his village and a prayer he composed to cure his buffalo. At the age of 86, he died surrounded by his loved ones and full of prayers and divine thoughts.

== Works ==
The collection of his compositions include, Azhahar Kuravanji in praise of Maliruncholamali Azhahar, Adaikkala malai, and Kayarkani malai in praise of Meenakshi Amman and Tiruvangaada Malai "in praise of Lord Venkatachalapathi." His other notable contribution is a collection called Perinbha kirthanaigal.

A few works are available giving a glimpse of his beautiful compositions. Azhahar Kuravanji, itself was first released with full notations by his illustrious grandson Koteeswara Ayyar in 1916 along with the Skaanda puranam and Perinba kirtahanigal in three volumes.

Koteeswara Ayyar is known for his compositions in the 72 Melakarta ragas. There is a small confusion between the two composers, as they have almost the same "mudrai". To avoid this confusion, Kavi Kunjara Bharathi used "kavikunjaram" as his mudrai and Koteeswara ayyar's mudrai was "kavikunjara dasan". In fact, the first volume of the 36 suddha madyama melakartas by Shri Koteeswara ayyar—called "Kanda ganamudham" is dedicated to his maternal grandfather Kavi Kunjara Bharathi.

A more recent version of Azahar Kuravanji was released by K. Nagamani, the son of Koteeswara Ayyar. Here are some of his other famous compositions:

- Elloraiyum Polave - Suddhasaveri
- Ennadi Penne Unakku - Begada
- Pithanavan - Anandbairavi
- Singaravelanai - Danyasi
- Sannidhi Kandu - Mohanam

The first song was the favourite of S.G. Kittappa and T.R. Mahalingam who have given disc recordings of it.

== Azhahar Kuravanji ==
Kuravanjis are dance-dramas in Tamil halfway between Bhaagavatha Mela Naataka and rustic dance-dramas. The accent is on high entertainment value with the use of Rakti raagas and folk tunes. Rhythmic sol-fa passages and onomatopoeic phrases are used to enliven the pure dance passages.

Azhahar Kuravanji is the story of the heroine falling in love with Maalazhagar. The first invocatory song in Kanada is in Sanskrit and here one can read the mudrai "Hitha kunjara bhanita" in the charanam. In fact, this first song itself shows that Kavikunjara Bhaarathi, a contemporary of Shri Tyaagaraaja, has adopted the classical division of the composition into pallavi, anupallavi and Charanam.

A beautiful description of Maalazhagar surrounded by his devotees performing all services follows in the Saaranga raga song. The arrival of Mohanavalli along with her sakhis is portrayed in the Khamaas raaga composition.

A few lines like the ones below makes one imagine the beautiful heroine playing ball with her friends

"Chandranenum vadanattil oli minna
Takatakajjanu takadari kitutajanu takadom enrani
Mohanavalli pandu aadinaal"

This song is followed by a classical kummi in Maanji raagam.

An interesting phraseology can be seen in the 3rd charanam:

"Mohanavalli yamuda valliyadi,
Muthuvalli adiyadi chitravalli.
Naagavalli pachundothihai valli, nava
Ratnavalli yaalnanda valli".

Maalazhagar comes in procession and Mohanavalli immediately falls in love with him. The famous song "Ivanaro in Khamboji" The astonished heroine says (in the first charanam):

"paadathiloru mangai pakkatiloru mangai,
Cheedattulavam poonda tirumaarbiloru mangai
Yedukkai anindano ivan daan en perumaano"

Mohanavalli is love-stricken and her mother is worried about her daughter's plight. This is depicted in the song in Kaapi:

"Malaiyum chempon olaiyum Varna
chelaiyum aniyaamal
Kaalaiyum andimaalaiyum ennam
Kalangi urakkam vilangiye miha endan
Mahal ennamo oru
Vahaiyaha irukkiraale"

Mohanavalli's Sakhi is then sent to Azhahar where she conveys the heroine's feelings in the beautiful song in Maanji "Mohanavalli minnal". The sakhi then consoles the heroine and asks her to be patient in the song in Kedaaragowla "paavaiye sami varumun ittanai padattam tan unakkenadi". Mohanavalli then laments to the ocean about her love in the Chenchurutti song and she rebukes the moon on being cruel towards her in the song in Behag. Enters the Gypsy in the famous song in Begada "maalai Kuravanji Vandaale". The gypsy woman's beauty is described in the second charanam:

"Minnalennum idaiyaal – annamennum nadaiyaal
Menkai ilangiya kanganavosai
Kaleen kaleen enru kulunga nalangodu
Maalai Kuravanji Vandaale"

One can see the use of onomatopoeia to bring out the movement of the hands and the tinkling of bracelets. This is then followed by a fairly long passage describing the Gypsy tribe and their ways. There is a full description of the flora and fauna and it would be interesting to compare the current eco-system with the one described in this kuravanji.

In the Bhairavi song the gypsy vaunts of her capacities as in these lines:

"kallinum naar iruppen – manalaiyum
Kayirena thirippen nalla
Vallamaiyayangai nelli-k- kaniyena
Chollum kurikondu velluven"

Mohanavalli requests the gypsy to read her palm lines and the gypsy then starts the rituals before undertaking this task. She finally predicts the heroine's future and assures her that her wishes will be fulfilled. The gypsy announces the arrival of Maalazhahar in the romantic Sahaana raaga song "Vandu cheruvar maane".

The final marriage scene is described in the song in Mohanam. This is followed by a secondary folk theme on the marriage of the gypsy woman. The play ends with a mangalam in Sauraashtram.

== See also ==
- List of Carnatic composers

== Sources ==
- Kavi Kunjara Bharthi, Madurakavi Bharathi padangal and Ramakavirayar padangal, pammal vijayaranga Mudaliyar, 1889, Madras
- Azhahar Kuravanji, K.Nagamani, Alliance Press, Chennai, 1963
- Kandaganamudam, N.Koteeswara Ayyar, The Madras law Journal press, Mylapore, 1932.
- http://www.indian-heritage.org/music/garlandk.htm
