= Punnagavarali =

Janya raga of Carnatic music

- Arohanam: N₂ S R₁ G₂ M₁ P D₁ N₂
- Avarohanam: N₂ D₁ P M₁ G₂ R₁ S N₂

Punnagavarali, a raga in Carnatic Music, is a derived scale from Hanumatodi, which is the 8th melakarta Raga in the 72 melakarta system.

Punnagavarali raga is associated with karuna rasa and snakes (naga means snake). Snake charmers play this scale. It is said to attract snakes, if sung perfectly. In wedding ceremonies, a piece called the Odam usually played at the muhurtam, is often in Punnagavarali. This is an ancient raga and traditional Tamil pieces such as Nondichindu are also set in this.

== Structure and lakshana ==
Punnagavarali is a nishadantya raga (starts and ends in a single octave, nishada to nishada) and is hence usually presented in the madhyama sruti. In the ascent the chatusruti rishabha also occurs, sometimes. The raga's regal presence is best felt in slow phrases.

The notes include kaisiki nishada, sadja, suddha rishabha, sadharana gandhara, suddha madhyama, pancama and suddha dhaivata. Its ārohaṇa-avarohaṇa structure is as follows (see swaras in Carnatic music for details on below notation and terms):

- ArOhaNam: N₂ S R₁ G₂ M₁ P D₁ N₂ (Note: Alternate notations: Hindustani: Ṉ S Ṟ G̱ M P Ḏ Ṉ; Western: B♭ C D♭ E♭ F G A♭ B♭)
- avarOhaNam: N₂ D₁ P M₁ G₂ R₁ S N₂ (Note: Alternate notations: Hindustani: Ṉ Ḏ P M G̱ Ṟ S Ṉ; Western: B♭ A♭ G F E♭ D♭ C B♭)

== See also ==
- List of Film Songs based on Ragas
