= Ennappadam Venkatarama Bhagavatar =

Ennappadam Venkatarama Bhagavatar (1880–1961) was a composer of Carnatic music.

One of his books, Venkata Ramaniyam, has been recommended as a textbook by Kerala University.
