= Annamalai Reddiyar =

Indian poet

Annamalai Reddiyar or Reddiar (1865–1891) was a Tamil poet and composer.

Born in Sennikulam, Sankarankoil taluk, Tirunelveli district, Tamil Nadu, he studied Tamil under Ramaswami Pulavar and U. V. Swaminatha Iyer and was later patronised by the zamindar of Uttrumalai.

He is particularly remembered for his Kavadi Chindu, a genre of songs chanted by devotees of Lord Murugan while performing Kavadi Attam.
