= N. S. Ramachandran =

Indian composer

- Born: 1908
- Genre: Carnatic music
- Occupation: Composer

N. S. Ramachandran (born 1908) was one of the leading composers of Carnatic music from India.
