= Cheyyur Chengalvaraya Sastri =

Indian carnatic music composer

Cheyyur Chengalvaraya Sastri (1810–1900) was a carnatic music composer that lived in the 19th century.

Chengalvaraya Sastri was born in 1810 in Perumpedu village in Chengalpattu district of Tamil Nadu, India. His original family name was Marpeddi. He was proficient in Sanskrit, Telugu, Bharatanatyam, and music. He composed several kritis, padams, and yakshaganams in Sanskrit and Telugu, and a few in Tamil. Upon the invitation of Periya Kalappa, a Jamindar of Cheyyur, he left his hometown, and settled in Cheyyur, and hence was known as Cheyyur Chengalvaraya Sastri. He was a devotee of Goddess Muktamba Devi of Cheyyur, and stayed lifelong devoted to her temple, even rejecting an invitation from the King of Berhampur.

Chengalvaraya Sastri composed about a thousand kritis. Of those, 360 were on Goddess Kamakshi of Kanchi, 240 on Goddess Meenakshi of Madhura, and more than 100 on Lord Venkateshwara. Most of his kritis were extemporaneous compositions. He also composed a Muddukumara Satakam, a Yakshaganam titled "Sundareshwara Vilasam" in Telugu, a padya prabandham titled "Charuleela Vilasam" in Telugu. He used his own name, "chengalvaraya" as his "mudra" in his compositions.

== Popular Compositions ==
- ambA nannAdaricavE - tODi
- aviraLamagu bhakti - c/dhruva
- bhAratI bhagavatiI - madhyamAvati
- Emamma mina nayana - kalyANi
- Emamma vinavE - suraTi
- enta vEDinagAni - darbAr
- idi manci sudinamammA - sArangA
- inta tAmasamElanE - cenjuruTi
- lalite mAm pAhi - yadukulakAmbhOji
- nI ruci marigina - bilahari
- pArthasArathini bhajiyincani - yadukulakAmbhOji
- rE maanasa bhajarE - naaTTai
- rE rE mAnasa bhajare - nATa
- sarOjadaLAya - kAmbhOji
- vArAhi mAm pAhi - kalyANi
- venkaTAcalEsha pAhimAm - bhairavi
- vEnkaTaramaNa mAmava - nATa

== See also ==
- List of Carnatic composers
