= Veene Sheshanna =

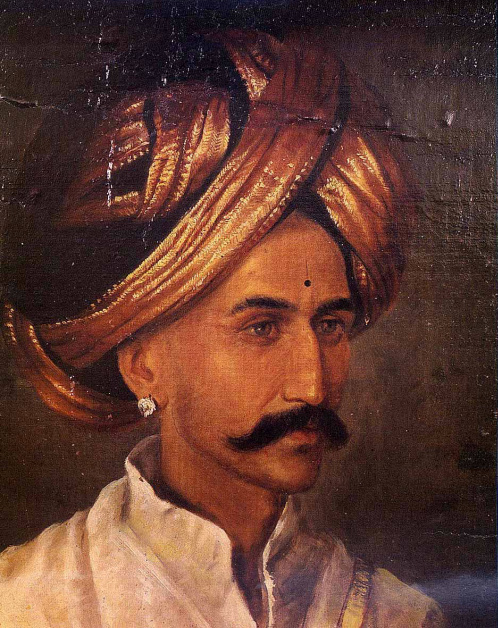
Veene Sheshanna (1852-1926).

Veene Sheshanna (1852—1926) was an exponent of the veena, a classical Indian lute, which he played in the Carnatic music style. He was a concert musician at the court of the princely state of Mysore in southern India, but his performances were admired throughout Eurasia, including by King George V of England, who held a portrait of him at the Buckingham Palace.

== Family ==
Veene Sheshanna was born in Mysore in 1852 into a family of celebrated classical musicians.

Veene Seshanna (right) with Veene Subbanna, c.1902.

== Musical style ==
Until the late 19th century, the veena would be held vertically while being played. Not unlike the sitar, the gourd would rest in the lap of the player, who would sit cross-legged while performing. Sheshanna established a new convention by keeping the veena in a horizontal position while playing it.

Sheshanna seems to be the originator of what is now the known as the Mysore style of playing the veena.

== Contributions ==
Sheshanna composed 53 pieces of music covering the genres of svarajathi, pada, javali, and thillana. He had a deep understanding of Hindustani classical music as well. His thillanas in the ragas Behag and Darbari Kannada are proof of this.

One of Sheshanna's most beloved concert veenas as well as Raja Ravi Varma's famous portrait of him can be viewed at the Manjusha Museum, a conservatory of historical artefacts in Dharmasthala, Karnataka.

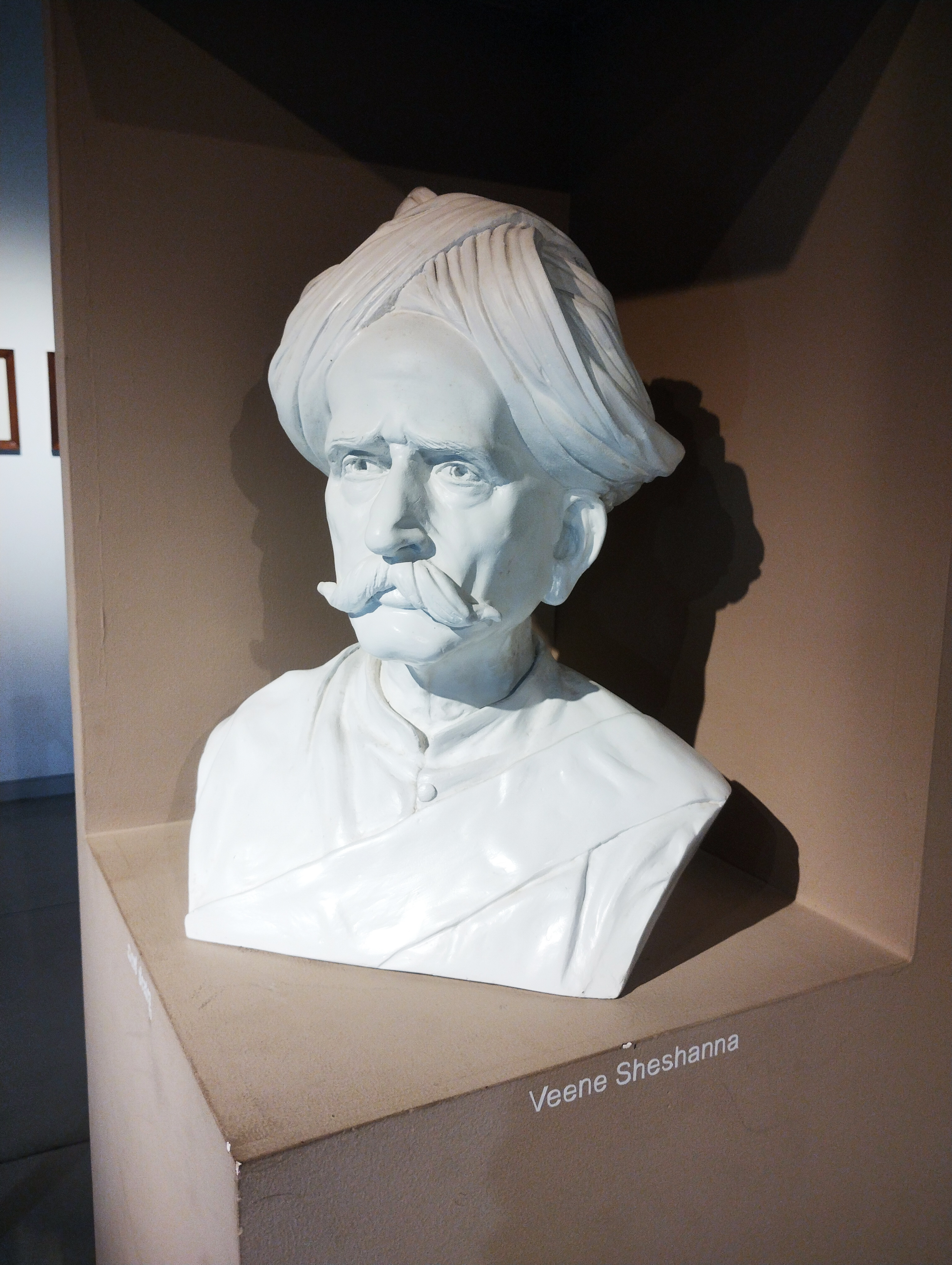
Sculpture of Veene Sheshanna at Venkatappa Art Gallery, Bengaluru (2026)
