= Kedaram =

Janya raga of Carnatic music

- Arohanam: S M₁ G₃ M₁ P N₃ Ṡ
- Avarohanam: Ṡ N₃ P M₁ G₃ R₂ S

Kedaram (pronounced kēdāram) is a rāgam in Carnatic music (musical scale of South Indian classical music). It is a derived scale (janya rāgam) from Shankarabharanam, the 29th Melakarta rāgam.

== Structure and Lakshana ==
Kedaram is an asymmetric scale that does not contain dhaivatam. It is called a vakra audava-shadava rāgam, in Carnatic music classification. This classification implies that it has 5 notes in ascending scale with zig-zag notes and 6 notes in descending scale. Its ārohaṇa-avarohaṇa structure is as follows (see swaras in Carnatic music for details on below notation and terms):

- ārohaṇa : S M₁ G₃ M₁ P N₃ Ṡ (Note: Alternate notations: Hindustani: S M G M P N Ṡ; Western: C F E F G B C)
- avarohaṇa : Ṡ N₃ P M₁ G₃ R₂ S (Note: Alternate notations: Hindustani: Ṡ N P M G R S; Western: C B G F E D C)

Kedaram - Arohanam and Avarohanam

This scale uses the notes shadjam, chatusruti rishabham, antara gandharam, shuddha madhyamam, panchamam and kakali nishadam.

== Related ragams ==
Kedaram is similar to Natbehag of Hindustani classical music. The Kedar of Hindustani music belongs to Kalyan thaat and is quite different from Kedaram.
