= Shree ranjani =

Janya raga of Carnatic music

Sriranjani
- Arohanam: S R₂ G₂ M₁ D₂ N₂ Ṡ
- Avarohanam: Ṡ N₂ D₂ M₁ G₂ R₂ S

Sriranjani is a ragam in Carnatic music (musical scale of South Indian classical music). It is a hexatonic scale (shadava rāgam, which means "of six"). It is a derived scale (janya rāgam), as it does not have all the seven swaras (musical notes). It is also written as Shri ranjani or Shree Ranjani. It also exist in Hindustani music, with a different scale. Aroh: Sa, komal Ga, Ma, Dha, komal Ni, Sa; Avroh: Sa, komal Ni, Dha, Ma, komal Ga, Ré, Sa.

== Structure and Lakshana ==
Shree ranjani scale with shadjam at C

Shree ranjani is a symmetric scale that does not contain panchamam. It is called a shadava-shadava rāgam, in Carnatic music classification (as it has six notes in both ascending and descending scales). Its ārohaṇa-avarohaṇa structure is as follows (see swaras in Carnatic music for details on below notation and terms):

- ārohaṇa : S R₂ G₂ M₁ D₂ N₂ Ṡ (Note: Alternate notations: Hindustani: S R G̱ M D Ṉ Ṡ; Western: C D E♭ F A B♭ C)
- avarohaṇa : Ṡ N₂ D₂ M₁ G₂ R₂ S (Note: Alternate notations: Hindustani: Ṡ Ṉ D M G̱ R S; Western: C B♭ A F E♭ D C)

This scale uses the notes shadjam, chathusruti rishabham, sadharana gandharam, shuddha madhyamam, chathusruthi dhaivatham and kaisiki nishadam. Shree ranjani is a janya rāgam of Kharaharapriya, the 22nd Melakarta rāgam. It has only the invariant panchamam missing from its parent scale, Kharaharapriya.
