= Surutti =

Janya raga of Carnatic music

- Arohanam: S R₂ M₁ P N₂ D₂ N₂ Ṡ
- Avarohanam: Ṡ N₂ D₂ P M₁ G₃ P M₁ R₂ S
- Equivalent: Mixolydian mode

Surutti raga's Janaka raga Harikambhoji scale with Shadjam at C

Surutti (or Surati) is a rāgam in Carnatic music (musical scale of South Indian classical music). It is the janya ragam of 28th Melakarta rāgam Harikambhoji in the 72 melakarta rāgam system. Subbarama Dikshitar classifies this a bhashanga raga. Its a Vakra raga (Zig-zag raga scale with seven notes in Arohana and nine in Avarohana)

The parent scale of this raga is equivalent to Khamaj thaat of Hindustani Music. The Janaka raga of this raga is known as Harikedāragowla in the Muthuswami Dikshitar school of music.

The notes of this raga is equivalent to Mixolydian mode of Western music but note order is zig-zag.

== Structure and Lakshana ==
Its ārohaṇa-avarohaṇa structure is as follows (see swaras in Carnatic music for details on below notation and terms):

- ārohaṇa: S R₂ M₁ P N₂ D₂ N₂ Ṡ (Note: Alternate notations: Hindustani: S R M P Ṉ D Ṉ Ṡ; Western: C D F G B♭ A B♭ C)
- avarohaṇa: Ṡ N₂ D₂ P M₁ G₃ P M₁ R₂ S (Note: Alternate notations: Hindustani: Ṡ Ṉ D P M G P M R S; Western: C B♭ A G F E G F D C)

== See also ==
- List of Film Songs based on Ragas
