= Khamas (raga) =

Janya raga of Carnatic music

- Arohanam: S M₁ G₃ M₁ P D₂ N₂ Ṡ
- Avarohanam: Ṡ N₂ D₂ P M₁ G₃ R₂ S

'Khamas or Kamās/ Khamās /Khamāch/ Khamāj / Kamāchi (கமாச்) (ఖమాస్)' ಖಮಾಚ್ is a rāgam in Carnatic music (musical scale of South Indian classical music). It is a janya rāgam (derived scale) from the 28th melakarta scale Harikambhoji. It is a janya scale, as it does not have all the seven swaras (musical notes) in the ascending scale.

It is a scale that evokes Shringara rasa. It is suitable for javali type compositions.

== Structure and lakshana ==
Parent scale Harikambhoji with shadjam at C

Khamas is an asymmetric rāgam that does not contain rishabham in the ascending scale. It is a vakra-shadava-sampurna rāgam (vakra-shadava, meaning 6 notes in ascending scale with zig-zag moves). Its ārohaṇa-avarohaṇa structure (ascending and descending scale) is as follows:

- ārohaṇa : S M₁ G₃ M₁ P D₂ N₂ Ṡ (Note: Alternate notations: Hindustani: S M G M P D Ṉ Ṡ; Western: C F E F G A B♭ C)
- avarohaṇa : Ṡ N₂ D₂ P M₁ G₃ R₂ S (Note: Alternate notations: Hindustani: Ṡ Ṉ D P M G R S; Western: C B♭ A G F E D C)

The notes used in this scale are shadjamam, antara gandharam, shuddha madhyamam, panchamam, chathusruthi dhaivatam and kaisiki nishadham in ascending scale, with chathusruthi rishabham included in descending scale. For the details of the notations and terms, see swaras in Carnatic music.

== Alternate versions ==
Originally, Khamas was an upanga raga (uses only the notes in the parent scale). Later with the usage in javalis and other later compositions, the bhashanga type of Khamas came into use (using notes external to the scale). Kakali nishadam (N3) is introduced as anya swara (external note) occasionally.

According to Muthuswami Dikshitar school of music, Khamas is a sampurna raga with no zig-zag notes (no vakra usage).

Khamāj (खमाज) of Hindustani Music closely resembles Khamas raga. The Hindi film song ‘Tere Mere Milan Ki’ from the movie Abhimaan is based on Khamaj.
