= Mukhari =

Janya raga of Carnatic music

- Arohanam: S R₂ M₁ P N₂ D₂ Ṡ
- Avarohanam: Ṡ N₂ D₁ P M₁ G₂ R₂ S

Mukhari (pronounced mukhāri) is a rāga in Carnatic music (musical scale of South Indian classical music). It is a janya rāga of Kharaharapriya.
