= Darbar (raga) =

Janya raga of Carnatic music, also used in Hindustani classical music

- Mela: 22nd, Kharaharapriya
- Arohanam: S R₂ M₁ P D₂ N₂ Ṡ
- Avarohanam: Ṡ N₂ D₂ P M₁ R₂ G₂ G₂ R₂ S
- Chhaya svaras: G₂, N₂
- Similar: Nayaki

Darbar (pronounced darbār) is a ragam in Carnatic music. The raga is a comparatively recent entry to Carnatic Music, possibly in the earlier part of the 18th century.

== Structure and lakshana ==
It is a Vakra ragam derived from the 22nd Melakarta rāgam Kharaharapriya. Nishadham and ghandharam used as long in the Avarohana. Its ārohaṇa-avarohaṇa structure is as follows (see swaras in Carnatic music for details on below notation and terms):

- ārohaṇa: S R₂ M₁ P D₂ N₂ Ṡ (Note: Alternate notations: Hindustani: S R M P D Ṉ Ṡ; Western: C D F G A B♭ C)
- avarohaṇa: Ṡ N₂ D₂ P M₁ R₂ G₂ G₂ R₂ S (Note: Alternate notations: Hindustani: Ṡ Ṉ D P M R G̱ G̱ R S; Western: C B♭ A G F D E♭ E♭ D C)

The notes used are shadjam, chathusruthi rishabham, sadharana gandharam, shuddha madhyamam, panchamam, chathusruthi dhaivatham, kaisiki nishadham.

Arohanam and Avarohanam for Darbar

== Related ragams ==
Darbar resembles Nayaki.

== See also ==
- List of film songs based on ragas

== Sources ==
- Darbār Rāga (Kar), The Oxford Encyclopaedia of the Music of India. Oxford University Press. ISBN 978-0-19-565098-3.
