= Kedaragaula =

Janya raga of Carnatic music

- Arohanam: S R₂ M₁ P N₂ Ṡ
- Avarohanam: Ṡ N₂ D₂ P M₁ G₃ R₂ S

Kedaragaula (pronounced kēdāragaula) is a rāgam in Carnatic music (musical scale of South Indian classical music). It is a janya rāgam (derived scale) from the 28th melakarta scale Harikambhoji, and is sometimes spelled as Kedaragowla. It is a janya scale, as it does not have all the seven swaras (musical notes) in the ascending scale. It is a combination of the pentatonic scale Madhyamavati and the sampurna raga scale Harikambhoji. It is a morning rāgam.

== Structure and Lakshana ==
Ascending scale with shadjam at C, which is same as Madhyamavati scale

Descending scale with shadjam at C, which is same as Harikambhoji scale

Kedaragaula is an asymmetric rāgam that does not contain gandharam and dhaivatam in the ascending scale. It is an audava-sampurna rāgam (or owdava rāgam, meaning pentatonic ascending scale). Its ārohaṇa-avarohaṇa structure (ascending and descending scale) is as follows:

- ārohaṇa : S R₂ M₁ P N₂ Ṡ (Note: Alternate notations: Hindustani: S R M P Ṉ Ṡ; Western: C D F G B♭ C)
- avarohaṇa : Ṡ N₂ D₂ P M₁ G₃ R₂ S (Note: Alternate notations: Hindustani: Ṡ Ṉ D P M G R S; Western: C B♭ A G F E D C)

The notes used in this scale are shadjam, chathusruthi rishabham, shuddha madhyamam, panchamam and kaisiki nishadham in ascending scale, with chatusruti dhaivatam and antara gandharam included in descending scale. For the details of the notations and terms, see swaras in Carnatic music.
