= Sahana (raga) =

Janya raga of Carnatic music

- Arohanam: S R₂ G₃ M₁ P M₁ D₂ N₂ Ṡ
- Avarohanam: Ṡ N₂ D₂ P M₁ G₃ M₁ R₂ G₃ R₂ S

Sahana (pronounced sahānā) is a popular ragam (musical scale) in Carnatic music. It is a janya rāgam (derived scale) associated with the 28th Melakarta rāgam Harikambhoji.

The Hindustani music ragam Sahana is an upper-tetrachord-dominant Kanada-anga raga, from the Kafi thaat, also allied with Bageshree and Bhimpalasi. The shuddha Dhaivat is an important rest note (nyaas swara).

== Structure and Lakshana ==
It is a Ubhaya Vakra sampoorna ragam. Vakra means crooked. Ubhaya Vakra means that the notes in both ascent and descent follow a zig zag pattern. The notes in ascending and descending scale do not follow a strict progression. Hence the note phrases contain such vakra phrases, lending a unique beauty to this rāgam. Though it is a sampoorna rāgam (contains all 7 notes), the vakra scale means it is not considered a melakarta, as melakarta rāgams must have strictly ascending and descending scales. It is also classified as a rakti raga (raga with high melodic content).

Its ārohaṇa-avarohaṇa structure (ascending and descending scale) is as follows (see swaras in Carnatic music for details on below notation and terms):

- ārohaṇa: S R₂ G₃ M₁ P M₁ D₂ N₂ Ṡ (Note: Alternate notations: Hindustani: S R G M P M D Ṉ Ṡ; Western: C D E F G F A B♭ C)
- avarohaṇa: Ṡ N₂ D₂ P M₁ G₃ M₁ R₂ G₃ R₂ S (Note: Alternate notations: Hindustani: Ṡ Ṉ D P M G M R G R S; Western: C B♭ A G F E F D E D C)

The notes used in this scale are Shadjam, Chathusruthi Rishabham, Antara Gandharam, Suddha Madhyamam, Panchamam, Chathusruthi Dhaivatham and Kaisiki Nishadham.

Its characteristic phrases are (R2 G3 M1 P),(P M1 D2 N2), (N2 S D2), (G3 M1 R2). Sahana has a distinct mood due to these phrases and characteristic gamakams and is rarely confused with other ragams.

Sahana has a close relationship to Malavi and to some extent Dwijawanthi/Jujavanti. While the use of Anthara Gaandharam in R2 G2 R2 makes it different from Dwijawanthi, since Dwijawanthi uses Saadharana Gaandharam, sahana has a closer relationship with Malavi which has an identical Vakra scale formation as Sahana.

== The original Sahana of Carnatic music ==
The original Sahana is the janya ragam of Sri melakarta. It is "bhashanga", "sampurna", "desiya", panchama "vakra" in arohanam and suitable for singing at all times.The raga is a desiya raga meaning it made its way to theory, from practice. It was evolved in the public domain, enjoyed the airtime with listeners and musicians and then it became important enough to be inducted into the portals of our music as a formal raga, distinct in its svarupa, appeal and capable of being moulded into compositions. The jeeva swaras : R₂ - rishabham, G₂ - gandharam and N₂ - nishadam provide extraordinary ranjana. Synonyms : Chahana, Shahana, sahana.

Arohanam : S R₂ G₂ M₁ P M₁ D₂ N₂ Ṡ

Avarohanam : Ṡ N₂ D₂ P M₁ G₂ R₂ G₂ R₂ S

The swaras are S -Shadjam, R₂ - Chaturshruti rishabham, G₂ - Sadharana gandharam, G₃* - Antara Gandharam, M₁ - Shuddha madhyamam, P - Panchamam, D₂ - Chaturshruti dhaivatham and N₂ -Kaishiki nishadam. The ragam is bhashaga because; G₃* - Anthara gandharam occurs sparingly.

Reference : Sangita Sampradaya Priyadarshini cakram 1-4
