= Bhairavi (Carnatic) =

Janya raga of Carnatic music

- Mela: Natabhairavi
- Type: Sampurna
- Arohanam: S R₂ G₂ M₁ P D₂ N₂ Ṡ
- Avarohanam: S N₂ D₁ P M₁ G₂ R₂ Ṡ
- Similar: Manji; Mukhari; Huseni; Saindhavi; Srimati

Bhairavi is a janya rāgam in Carnatic music (musical scale of South Indian classical music). Though it is a sampoorna rāgam (scale having all 7 notes), it has two different dhaivathams in its scale making it a Bhashanga Ragam, and hence is not classified as a melakarta rāgam (parent scale).

This is one of the ancient rāgams, said to have been prevalent about 1500 years ago. There are numerous compositions in this rāgam.

== Compositions ==
- Kamakshi Swarajathi by Syama Sastri
- Indu Enage Govinda by Raghavendra Tirtha

== See also ==
- Kumar, Ranee (23 November 2012). "How well do we know Bhairavi?". The Hindu. Archived from the original on 31 August 2014.
