= Atana =

Janya raga of Carnatic music

- Mela: 29th, Shankarabharanam
- Arohanam: S R₂ M₁ P N₃ Ṡ
- Avarohanam: Ṡ N₃ D₂ P M₁ P G₃ R₂ S

Atana, Athana or Adana (अठाण / अठाणा / अडाणा) is a raga (musical scale) in Carnatic music (South Indian classical music). It is a Janya raga (derived scale), whose janaka (parent Melakarta) raga is the 29th Melakarta Sankarabharanam, 29th raga, commonly known as Dhirasankarabharanam in the Melakarta system. There is also a Hindustani raaga named Adana (अडाणा); however, it is unrelated.

Atana is very common in drama music. The note structures include, "Sadja, Chatusruti Rishabha, Suddha Madhyama, Pancama, Chatusruti Dhaivata, Kaisiki Nishada and as a rare feature, Kakali Nishada in descent."

It is considered by listeners to be a very catchy raga that gives a stage flavor for a musician if anything is going dull in a concert, and can make the concert's audience more engaged through its qualities of Veeram (courage).

== Structure and Lakshana ==
Parent scale Shankarabharanam with Shadjam at C

Atana is one of those rare organically developed Raga where it doesn't adhere to strict ascending and descending order but has phrases which are used in interwoven patterns in its improvisation. Its ārohaṇa-avarohaṇa structure (ascending and descending scale) is as follows (see swaras in Carnatic music for details on below notation and terms):

- ārohaṇa : S R₂ M₁ P N₃ Ṡ (Note: Alternate notations: Hindustani: S R M P N Ṡ; Western: C D F G B C)
- avarohaṇa : Ṡ N₃ D₂ P M₁ P G₃ R₂ S (Note: Alternate notations: Hindustani: Ṡ N D P M P G R S; Western: C B A G F G E D C)

The swaras used are chatushruti rishabham, antara gandharam, shuddha madhyamam, chatushruti daivatam and kakali nishadam. Atana is a bhashanga raga (kind of raga where the arohana and avarohana are not strictly followed). It has two anya swaras (alien notes or foreign swaras), being sadharana gandharam (G2) and kaishiki nishadham (N2).
