= Dhanyasi =

Janya raga of Carnatic music

- Arohanam: S G₁ M₁ P N₁ Ṡ
- Avarohanam: Ṡ N₁ D₁ P M₁ G₁ R₁ S

Dhanyasi is a rāgam in Carnatic music (musical scale of South Indian classical music). It is a janya rāgam (derived scale) from the 8th melakarta scale Hanumatodi. It is a janya scale, as it does not have all the seven swaras (musical notes) in the ascending scale. It is a combination of the pentatonic scale Shuddha Dhanyasi and the sampurna raga scale Hanumatodi.

This is the common and popular scale and is used for portraying the bhakthi rasa. According to the Muthuswami Dikshitar school, Dhanyasi is derived from Nariritigaula Melakarta scale, instead of Hanumatodi scale and includes Chathushruthi Rishabham in the Avarohanam.

== Structure and Lakshana ==
Ascending scale with shadjam at C, which is same as Udayaravichandrika scale

Descending scale with shadjam at C, which is same as Hanumatodi scale

Dhanyasi is an asymmetric rāgam that does not contain rishabham or dhaivatam in the ascending scale. It is an audava-sampurna rāgam (or owdava rāgam, meaning pentatonic ascending scale). Its ārohaṇa-avarohaṇa structure (ascending and descending scale) is as follows:

- ārohaṇa : S G₂ M₁ P N₂ Ṡ (Note: Alternate notations: Hindustani: S G̱ M P Ṉ Ṡ; Western: C E♭ F G B♭ C)
- avarohaṇa : Ṡ N₂ D₁ P M₁ G₂ R₁ S (Note: Alternate notations: Hindustani: Ṡ Ṉ Ḏ P M G̱ Ṟ S; Western: C B♭ A♭ G F E♭ D♭ C)

The notes used in this scale are shadjam, sadharana gandharam, shuddha madhyamam, panchamam and kaishiki nishadham in ascending scale, with shuddha dhaivatam and shuddha rishabham included in descending scale. For the details of the notations and terms, see swaras in Carnatic music.

The rāgam used by Dikshitar school of music uses chathusruti rishabham (R2) in the descending scale, in place of shuddha rishabham (R1), bringing it under the 20th melakarta Natabhairavi.
