= Arabhi =

Janya raga of Carnatic music

- Arohanam: S R₂ M₁ P D₂ Ṡ
- Avarohanam: Ṡ N₃ D₂ P M₁ G₃ R₂ S

Arabhi or Aarabhi (pronounced ārabhi) is a ragam (musical scale) in Carnatic music (South Indian classical music). It is a Janya raga (derived scale), whose Melakarta raga (parent scale, also known as janaka) is Shankarabharanam, 29th in the 72 Melakarta raga system. It is a combination of the pentatonic scale Shuddha Saveri (or Durga in Hindustani Music) and the sampurna raga scale Shankarabharanam.

Arabhi is a raga that dates back to 7 AD. Originally, it was called as pazhanthakkam in Ancient Tamil music. A very auspicious ragam that emanates Veera rasa (valour), Arabhi is one of the five Ghana ragams that shine with special brilliance when Thanam is played on Veena.

== Structure and Lakshana ==
Ascending scale with Shadjam at C

Descending scale with Shadjam at C

Its ārohaṇa-avarohaṇa structure (ascending and descending scale) is as follows (see swaras in Carnatic music for details on below notation and terms):

- ārohaṇa : S R₂ M₁ P D₂ Ṡ (Note: Alternate notations: Hindustani: S R M P D Ṡ; Western: C D F G A C)
- avarohaṇa : Ṡ N₃ D₂ P M₁ G₃ R₂ S (Note: Alternate notations: Hindustani: Ṡ N D P M G R S; Western: C B A G F E D C)

Arabhi raga is an Owdava-sampoorna raga meaning, 5 swaras occur in the arohana (so it is called Owdava) and in avarohana all swaras occur (so sampoorna).

It is a raga without much gamakas and frequency variations, relying instead on flat notes. The important point is the swara "ga" always comes very close to "ma" so when we sing the phrase "ma ga ri" it sounds like "ma ma ri". Likewise the swara "ni" always comes very close to the swara "sa" hence when we sing the phrase "sa ni da" it sounds like "sa sa da".

The closest raga to this one is Devagandhari. There are few aspects which make Arabhi different (though both share the same ascending and desce

1. In Arabhi the swara "ga" is close to "ma" but in Devagandhari it is not the same.
2. The swara "ri" is not fluctuated in Arabhi but it is given "asaivu" in Devagandhari
3. The phrase "pa ma da sa" should not be sung in Arabhi, as it is exclusive for Devagandhari
4. Devagandhari is sung with gamakas and vilambita kala prayogas (usages with elongated notes)
5. Devagandhari is sung with deergha gandharam (elongated G3)
6. Devagandhari occasionally employs N2 alongside N3, this making it Bhashanga while Arabhi solely uses N3 and is Upanga.

Arabhi raga is energetic and it lends itself to creativity in brigas (fast-paced swara usages) more than gamakas.
