= Hanumatodi =

Raga in Carnatic music

- Arohanam: S R₁ G₂ M₁ P D₁ N₂ Ṡ
- Avarohanam: Ṡ N₂ D₁ P M₁ G₂ R₁ S
- Equivalent: Phrygian mode

Hanumatodi, more popularly known as Todi (pronounced hanumatōdi and tōdi), is a rāgam (musical scale) in Carnatic music. It is the 8th melakarta rāgam (parent scale) in the 72 melakarta rāgam system. This is sung very often in concerts. It is a difficult rāgam to perform in owing to its complexity in prayoga (phrases of notes and intonation). It is called Janatodi in Muthuswami Dikshitar school of Carnatic music. Its Western equivalent is the Phrygian mode. Todi in Carnatic music is different from Todi (thaat) of Hindustani music (North Indian classical music). The equivalent of the Hindustani raga Todi in Carnatic music is Shubhapantuvarali (which is the 45th melakarta). The equivalent of Carnatic Todi in Hindustani is Bhairavi thaat in terms of notes, but the two sound very different due to differing uses of gamakas.

== Structure and Lakshana ==
Todi scale with shadjam at C

It is the 2nd rāgam in the 2nd chakra Netra. The mnemonic name is Netra-Sri. The mnemonic phrase is sa ra gi ma pa dha ni. Its ārohaṇa-avarohaṇa structure is as follows (see swaras in Carnatic music page for details on below notation and terms):

- ārohaṇa : S R₁ G₂ M₁ P D₁ N₂ Ṡ (Note: Alternate notations: Hindustani: S Ṟ G̱ M P Ḏ Ṉ Ṡ; Western: C D♭ E♭ F G A♭ B♭ C)
- avarohaṇa : Ṡ N₂ D₁ P M₁ G₂ R₁ S (Note: Alternate notations: Hindustani: Ṡ Ṉ Ḏ P M G̱ Ṟ S; Western: C B♭ A♭ G F E♭ D♭ C)

This scale uses the notes shuddha rishabham, sadharana gandharam, shuddha madhyamam, shuddha dhaivatham and kaisiki nishadham. It is a sampoorna rāgam - rāgam having all 7 swarams. It is the shuddha madhyamam equivalent of Bhavapriya, which is the 44th melakarta scale. A peculiarity of this raga is that it is sung in all lower notes. It is also classified as a "rakti" raga (a raga of high melodic content).
