= Adi tala =

Rhythm used in Carnatic music

Adi tala (Sanskrit: ādi tāḷa, Kannada: ಆದಿ ತಾಳ, lit. 'primary rhythm'; also spelled aadi taalam or adi talam) is an eight-count tala or rhythmic cycle in South Indian classical music.

It is one of the most popular tala or rhythms used in Carnatic music. Its full technical name according to the Carnatic music's tala system is chaturaśra-naḍe chaturaśra-jāti triputa tāḷa.

== Structure ==
This tala has eight aksharas, each being 4 svaras long. Many kritis and around half of the varnams are set to this tala.
