= R. Ramachandran Nair =

Indian writer (born 1939)

Ramakrishna Pillai Ramachandran Nair (born 23 April 1939) is a retired Indian Administrative Service officer from Kottayam, Kerala, who served as collector of Kannur and Kollam districts, managing director of Travancore-Cochin Chemicals, secretary to various departments, and finally as the Chief Secretary of Kerala state in different intervals. He was also the founding Vice Chancellor of Sree Sankaracharya University of Sanskrit, Kalady. A prolific writer, he has also written many poems and essays in Sanskrit (under the pseudonym Thulaseevanam), Malayalam and English. His Sanskrit compositions, most of them being Carnatic kritis, praise more on the deities of Kerala temples, especially around Thiruvananthapuram and Kottayam. Nair is credited with popularising many temples in Kerala.

== Early life ==
Nair was born on the 10th of Medam 1115 (Malayalam calendar), 23 April 1939, in Mangombil house (his ancestral home) in Kottayam, Kerala as the fifth of the nine children of Thumbunkal Ramakrishna Pillai, a mathematics teacher by profession, and Mangombil Bharathi Amma. His ancestors originally hailed from Thirunavaya in the present-day Malappuram district, and migrated to Travancore following Tipu Sultan's invasion. He has seven brothers and a sister, among which one died at a very young age. He spent his childhood in Poonjar in the eastern side of Kottayam district. He was a brilliant student in his school, and passed SSLC with distinction in 1955. From a very young age itself, he learnt Sanskrit from noted scholars. After his education, he served as a teacher at University college in Thiruvananthapuram for a short time. He joined IAS in 1961.

== Personal life ==
Nair is married to Lakshmi R. Nair, the daughter of the late V. R. Pillai from Haripad, Alappuzha district. Their marriage happened on 8 December 1965, when Nair was 26 and Lakshmi was 19. The couple has two sons and a daughter. Their eldest son, Prof. R. Hemanth Kumar is the principal of Ettumanoorappan College, Ettumanoor, Kottayam district. The second son Dr. R. Ajay Kumar is a cardiologist by profession. The third child and only daughter, Anjali R. Mohan is a school teacher by profession in Chennai. Their son-in-law is a nephew of E. K. Nayanar, former Chief Minister of Kerala. Nair is a devotee of the noted Hindu saint and social reformer Chattambi Swamikal, and is a member of numerous organisations related to his ideologies.

== As a writer ==
Nair is well-known for Carnatic compositions, written under the pseudonym Thulaseevanam. His compositions usually feature the deities in Kerala temples, especially around Kottayam, his native place, and Thiruvananthapuram, where he finally settled. He is well-credited for popularising numerous temples in Kerala, like Pazhavangadi Ganapathi Temple, Sreekanteswaram Mahadeva Temple, Attukal Bhagavathi Temple, Kidangoor Subramanya Temple, Thirunakkara Mahadeva Temple, etc. He also wrote songs on Chattambi Swamikal, the noted social reformer of Kerala, whom he idolises most. Most of his songs were written in Sanskrit. Though he has immense poetic talent, he lacks musical proficiency, and thus he had to seek outside help for tuning his songs, just like Arunachala Kavirayar and Periyasamy Thooran. His songs have been composed and sung by numerous popular musicians like Maharajapuram Santhanam, T. V. Sankaranarayanan, T. N. Seshagopalan, R. K. Srikantan, Rajkumar Bharathi, Prince Rama Varma, Perumbavoor G. Raveendranath and numerous others. His most popular composition is Bhaja Manasa Vighneshwaram Anisham in the raga Bahudari.

=== Malayalam and English works ===
Composition	Raga	Tala	Praising	Temple
Akhilānda Nāyakā अखिलाण्डनायका	Madhyamavati	Adi	Shiva	N/A
Āmaya Karunāvāhini आमयकरुणावाहिनी	Poorvi Kalyani	Adi	Parvati	N/A
Āmaya Nāśana आमयनाशन	Kalyani	Adi	Venkateswara	Tirupati
Anagha Śambhō अनघशंभो	Yadukulakamboji	Roopakam	Shiva	Ettumanoor
Ātma Nivedanaṁ आत्मनिवेदनम्	Vrindavana Saaranga	Adi	Krishna	N/A
Bhāvaye Sādaraṁ भावये सादरम्	Keeravani	Adi	Sastha	Sabarimala
Bhaja Mānasa Vighneshwaramanisham भज मानस विघ्नेश्वरमनिशम्	Bahudari	Adi	Ganesha	Pazhavanagdi
Bhajāmahē Śrī Vināyakaṁ भजामहे श्री विनायकम्	Hamsadhwani	Adi	Ganesha	Pazhavanagdi
Bhajarē Cētaha भजरे चेतः	Arabhi	Adi	Ganesha	Pazhavanagdi
Bhajarē Mānasa Śāstāraṁ भजरे मानस शास्तारम्	Sindhu Bhairavi	Adi	Sastha	N/A
Bhajarē Śrīkaṇțeśvaraṁ भजरे श्रीकण्ठेश्वरम्	Kamboji	Adi	Shiva	Sreekanteswaram
Bhajē Surēśaṁ भजे सुरेशम्	Shriranjini	Adi	Venkateswara	Tirupati
Bhūtanātha Māṁ Pāhi भूतनाथ मांं पाहि	Saveri	Adi	Sastha	Sabarimala
Caraņayuga Smaraṇaṁ चरणयुगस्मरणम्	Malayamarutham	Adi	Krishna	Guruvayur
Dāsamimaṃ Pāhi दासमिमं पाहि	Begada	Adi	Shiva	Thirunakkara
Dainyāpahaṃ Bhāvaye दैन्यापहं भावये	Shriranjini/Thodi	Adi	Parvati	Kanyakumari
Dāsosmyahaṃ Danuja Śāsaka दासोस्म्यहं दनुजशासक	Mukhari	Adi	Krishna	Guruvayur
Dēvā Namō Namō देवा नमो नमो	Khamas	Adi	Chattambi Swamikal	N/A
Dēvā Vidyādhirājā देवा विद्याधिराजा	Kedara Gowla	Adi	Chattambi Swamikal	N/A
Dharmasthalēśvara धर्मसथलेश्वर	Ananda Bhairavi	Adi	Shiva	Dharmasthala
Duritāpahaṃ Aniśaṃ दुरितापहमनिशम्	Shriranjini	Adi	Sastha	Sabarimala
Duritāraṇya Kṛṣanmō दुरितारण्य कृषन्मो	Neelambari	Chappu	Krishna	Thirumala
Ēkaradanam Vāraṇa Vadanam एकरदनं वारणवदनम्	Hindolam	Adi	Ganesha	Pazhavangadi
Gajānana Mām Pālaya गजानन मां पालय	Mohanam	Adi	Ganesha	Pazhavangadi
Gajamukha Māmava गजमुख मामव	Reethigowla	Adi	Ganesha	Pazhavangadi
Gajānanam Bhaje गजाननं भजे	Kamalamanohari	Adi	Ganesha	Pazhavangadi
Gāyāmi Tava Nāma गायामि तव नाम	Huseni	Chappu	Krishna	Guruvayur
Girivara Putrīṃ गिरिवर पुत्रीम्	Dwijavanthi	Sanskrit	Parvati	Shankhumukham
Guruvāyupurēsha Surēsha गुरुवायुपुरेश सुरेश	Shaama	Adi	Krishna	Guruvayur
Hara Hara Shiva Pālaya हर हर शिव पालय	Shahana	Adi	Shiva	Ettumanoor
Harihara Tanūja Devā हरिहरतनूज देवा	Begada	Chappu	Sastha	Sabarimala
Indirā Mandiraṃ इन्दिरामन्दिरम्	Surutti	Adi	Venkateswara	Tirupati
Kāma Madāpaha काममदापह	Poorvikalyani	Adi	Shiva	Ettumanoor
Kāma Nishūdanam कामनिषूदनम्	Yadukulakamboji	Adi	Shiva	Dharmasthala
Karuņākaram Śrīkaram कऱुणाकरं श्रीकरम्	Pantuvarali	Roopakam	Krishna	Guruvayur
Kērala Bhūtalapālā केरळ भूतलपाला	Devagandhari	Adi	Sastha	Sabarimala
Kuru Śubham Adhunā कुरु शुभम् अधुना	Shaama	Adi	Sastha	Sabarimala
Laṃbōdaram Bhāvayē लम्बोदरं भावये	Kamboji	Adi	Ganesha	N/A
Mādhava Harē माधव हरे	Todi	Adi	Vishnu	Thiruvananthapuram
Mahishī Madahara महिषीमदहर	Poorvikalyani	Adi	Sastha	Sabarimala
Māmava Mādhava मामव माधव	Behag	Adi	Venkateswara	Tirupati
Māmava Mahēśvarī मामव महेश्वरी	Bhairavi	Adi	Parvati	Shankhumukham
Māmava Māmava मामव मामव	Dhanyasi	Adi	Venkateswara	Tirupati
Māmava Vidyādhirājā मामव विद्याधिराजा	Abhogi	Adi	Chattambi Swamikal	N/A
Maňgaľa Guņārņava मङ्गळ गुणार्णव	Kalyani	Roopakam	Chattambi Swamikal	N/A
Maranda Bhāshiņī मरन्दभाषिणी	Chakravakam	Adi	Saraswati	Panachikkadu
Māyā Mānusha Hare मायामानुष हरे	Mukhari	Roopakam	Krishna	Guruvayur
Mūkāmbikām Āśrayē मूकांबिकाम् आश्रये	Dhanyasi	Adi	Mookambika	Kollur
Namāmi Vijayām नमामि विजयाम्	Charukesi	Adi	Parvati	Kumaranalloor
Nīlāmbara Sōdarā नीलांबरसोदरा	Surutti	Adi	Krishna	Guruvayur
Pāhimām Śrī Varāhamūrtē पाहिमां श्रीवराहमूर्ते	Ananda Bhairavi	Roopakam	Varaha	Sreevaraham
Paňkaja Dalanayanē पङ्कजदलनयने	Kanada	Adi	Parvati	Shankhumukham
Paramēśvara Pāhi परमेश्वर पाहि	Kedaram	Roopakam	Shiva	Sreekanteswaram
Paripāhi Dayākarā परिपाहि दयाकरा	Simhendramadhyamam	Roopakam	Murugan	Kidangoor
Pāvana Tīrthapādā पावन तीर्थपादा	Nattakurinji	Adi	Chattambi Swamikal	N/A
Sadā Namōstutē सदा नमोस्तुते	Mohanam	Adi	Ganesha	Pazhavangadi
Sādhaka Kalpalatē साधक कल्पलते	Mayamalavagowla	Adi	Saraswati	Panachikkadu
Śabarīśvaram Bhāvayē शबरीश्वरं भावये	Kharaharapriya	Adi	Sastha	Sabarimala
Śaraņāgata Vidhēyē शरणागतविधेये	Todi	Roopakam	Parvati	Shankhumukham
Sarvam Samāśrayē सर्वं समाश्रये	Suddha Dhanyasi	Roopakam	Shiva	Sreekanteswaram
Śata Ravi Śōbha शतरविशोभ	Kalyani	Misrachappu	Vishnu	Thiruvananthapuram
Śivakāminīm Bhāvayē शिवकामिनीं भावये	Mukhari	Adi	Parvati	Shankhumukham
Śivaśaňkara Pāhi शिवशङ्ककर पाहि	Shaama	Misrachappu	Shiva	Thirunakkara
Śrīharē Padmanābhā श्रीहरे पद्मनाभा	Devamanohari	Roopakam	Vishnu	Thiruvananthapuram
Śrī Padmanābha Harē श्रीपद्मनाभ हरे	Huseni	Misrachappu	Vishnu	Thiruvananthapuram
Śrīvallabham Bhajē श्रीवल्लभं भजे	Darbar	Roopakam	Vishnu	Thiruvalla
Śrīkara Māmava श्रीकर मामव	Poornachandrika	Khandachappu	Shiva	Sreekanteswaram
Śyāma Kalēbara श्यामकळेबर	Behag	Adi	Krishna	Guruvayur
Śyāma Kalēbaram श्यामकळेबरम्	Hindolam	Adi	Sastha	Sabarimala
Uragēndra Bhūshaņam उरगेन्द्रभूषणम्	Shankarabharanam	Roopakam	Shiva	Ettumanoor
Vandē Sadāham वन्दे सदाहम्	Saaranga	Adi	Krishna	Guruvayur
Vāraņavadanam Bhajām वारणवदनं भजम्	Gaula	Adi	Ganesha	Pazhavangadi
Venkatēśa Harē वेङ्कटेश हरे	Bageshri	Jhampa	Venkateswara	Tirupati
Vighnanāśana Prabhō विघ्ननाशन प्रभो	Madhyamavathi	Adi; Tishra gati	Ganesha	N/A
Vighnēśvarā Kumarā विघ्नेश्वरा कुमारा	Arabhi	Roopakam	Ganesha	Pazhavangadi
Vighnēśvara Śubhakara विघ्नेश्वर शुभकर	Arabhi	Roopakam	Ganesha	Pazhavangadi

== Controversies ==
=== Corruption related to Sanskrit University ===
Though Nair was instrumental in the formation of Sri Sankaracharya Sanskrit University, he caught up in corruption allegations on its matter. It was in the matter of purchasing land for sub-centres for the University that he was accused of. Due to this matter, he was suspended from service on 10 January 1997, when he was under a long leave. After his retirement, he was also arrested on the same matter, and became the first former Chief Secretary of Kerala, and probably in India itself, to be arrested on corruption allegations. But, he was later acquitted by the High Court of Kerala due to lack of evidence, and his time period under suspension, which lasted till his retirement on 30 April 1997, was regularised, thereby enabling him to enjoy full pension.

The case was that Nair caused a loss of ₹3.4 Million to the University by purchasing 75 cents of land from a private organisation named Sree Vidyadhiraja Vidya Samajam, which was founded by him, and was headed by R. Kumaran Nair, his elder brother, as the President, and his close friend named V. N. Krishna Pillai as the Secretary when this incident happened. The vigilance charge sheet said that Nair brought the land for an exorbitant amount of ₹50,000, while its price was just ₹5,650 in market rate. The Samajam had bought it just six months before this incident, at the rate of ₹3,000. Krishna Pillai was also arrested on its matter, while Kumaran Nair was acquitted due to lack of evidence earlier.

Nair accused his immediate successor C. P. Nair, a 1962 Batch IAS officer, and himself a noted writer, on this case. His accusation was that despite being a year junior to him in both birth and service, C. P. Nair was trying to topple him to get to the post of Chief Secretary earlier, but still the then-government appointed him, and enraged by this incident, C. P. Nair tied with the opposition parties, which came to power in 1996, and by considering this as an opportunity, framed him in the cases, which led to his suspension, and also prevented from him being appointed as the Cabinet Secretary of India, despite being the senior-most serving IAS officer at that time.
