= Lalgudi Jayaraman =

Indian violinist (1930–2013)

- Jayaraman in 2004

Background information
- Born: 17 September 1930; Edayathumangalam, Trichinopoly District, Madras Presidency, British India (now Tiruchirappalli district, Tamil Nadu, India)
- Died: 22 April 2013 (aged 82) Chennai, Tamil Nadu, India
- Genre: Indian classical music
- Occupations: Violinist, composer,
- Instrument: Violin
- Years active: 1942–2013

Lalgudi Gopal Jayaraman (17 September 1930 – 22 April 2013) was an Indian Carnatic violinist, vocalist and composer. He is commonly grouped with M.S. Gopalakrishnan and T.N.Krishnan as part of the violin trinity of Carnatic music. He was awarded the Padma Bhushan by the Government of India in 2001.

His disciples included his two children Lalgudi G. J. R. Krishnan and Lalgudi Vijayalakshmi; Harikatha exponent Vishaka Hari; Carnatic vocalist Saketharaman; Vittal Ramamurthy; film music composer Girishh G; and Bombay Jayashri Ramnath.

== Early life and background ==
Lalgudi Jayaraman is the fourth generation musician in the Shishya parampara of Sri Thyagaraja. Lalgudi Jayaraman's disciple lineage to Sri Thyagaraja traces back to his father Lalgudi V.R.Gopala Iyer, who learnt from Valadi Radhakrishna Iyer, who was a disciple of Lalgudi Rama Iyer, one of the direct disciples of Sri Thyagaraja.

He was trained in Carnatic music by his father, V.R.Gopala Iyer, under whose guidance he studied the traditions and techniques of the art form.

== Career ==
At the age of 12, he started his musical career as an accompanying violinist to Carnatic musicians before rising as a prominent soloist.

He expanded the style of violin playing by inventing a new technique that is designed to suit the needs of Indian Classical Music and establishing a unique style that came to be known as Lalgudi Bani. Jayaraman composed several 'kritis', 'tillanas' and 'varnams' and dance compositions, which are a blend of raga, bhava, rhythm and lyrical beauty. Lalgudi's instrumental talent comes to the fore in the form of lyrical excellence. He brought vocal style into violin, and his renditions exhibit knowledge of lyrical content of the compositions. Lalgudi actively and scientifically learned to self-critique his performances and dutifully wrote detailed reviews after each concert, a habit encouraged by his father and guru. He was loath to experiment on stage in his solo concerts and almost always planned to the last detail, leading a certain critic to tout them as being intellectual rather than emotional in spirit, but Lalgudi's spontaneity and innate musical genius were often seen when he accompanied leading vocalists.

He was always in great demand for accompanying vocalists, and has accompanied vocal virtuosos including Ariyakudi Ramanuja Iyengar, Chembai Vaidyanatha Bhagavatar, M. D. Ramanathan, Semmangudi Srinivasa Iyer, G. N. Balasubramaniam, Madurai Mani Iyer, Alathur brothers, Voleti Venkateswarulu, Nedunuri Krishnamurthy, K. V. Narayanaswamy, Maharajapuram Santhanam, D. K. Jayaraman, M.Balamuralikrishna, T. V. Sankaranarayanan, T. N. Seshagopalan and flute maestro N. Ramani. He was forbidden from accompanying female artistes by his father, a promise that he kept. He has given concerts extensively in India as well as abroad. The Government of India sent him to Russia as a member of the Indian Cultural Delegation.

He was the first to bring international attention to the Carnatic style of violin playing. He also introduced a new concept of musical ensemble with violin, venu (flute) and veena in 1966.

After inviting him to play the Edinburgh Festival in 1965, Yehudi Menuhin, the renowned violinist, impressed by Lalgudi's technique and performance, presented him with his Italian violin. Lalgudi presented Menuhin with an ivory dancing Nataraja when Menuhin visited India.

He has also performed in Singapore, Malaysia, Manila and East European countries. His recordings submitted to the International Music Council, Baghdad, Asian Pacific Music Rostrum and Iraq Broadcasting Agency by AIR New Delhi have been adjudged as the best and accorded the first position out of 77 entries received from the various countries during 1979. He was invited to give concerts at Cologne, Belgium and France. The Government of India chose him to represent India at the Festival of India in USA, London and he gave solo and 'Jugalbandi' concerts in London and also in Germany and Italy that received rave reviews. Sri Lalgudi went on a tour in the year 1984 to Oman, UAE, Qatar and Bahrain, which was highly successful. He composed the lyrics and music for the operatic ballet Jaya Jaya Devi, which premiered in 1994 at Cleveland, Ohio (US) and was staged in many other cities in the United States. In October 1999, Lalgudi performed in the UK under the auspices of Sruthi Laya Sangham (Institute of fine arts). After the concert, a dance drama Pancheswaram, composed by Lalgudi, was staged.

His biography, An Incurable Romantic, by Lakshmi Devnath, was released posthumously in 2013. It contains a foreword by sitarist Ravi Shankar, and charts his 70 years in the music industry.

== Awards ==
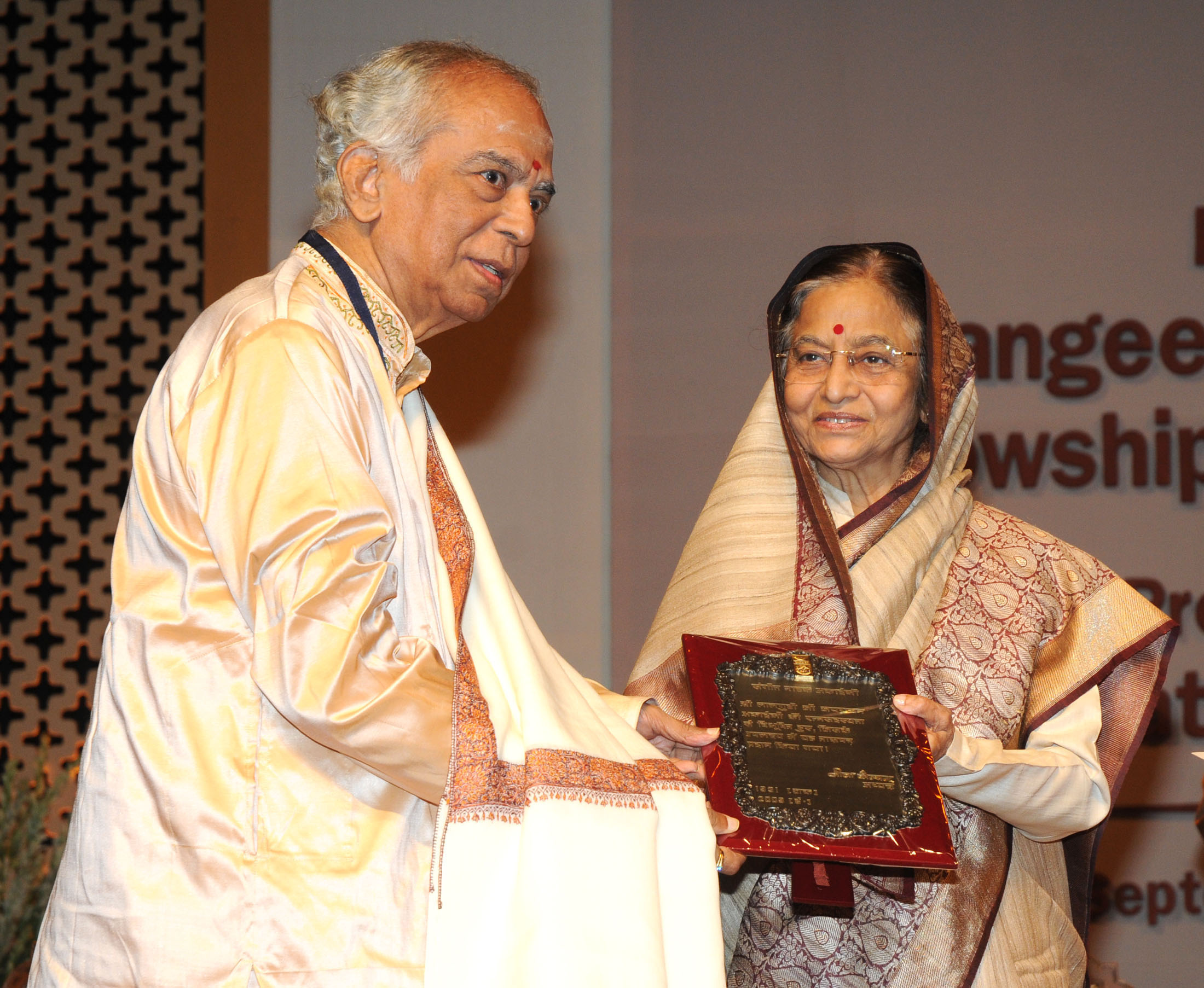
Pratibha Devisingh Patil presenting the Sangeet Natak Akademi Fellowship-2009 to Shri Lalgudi G. Jayaraman for his outstanding contribution to Carnatic music

Jayaraman earned several titles, such as 'Nada Vidya Tilaka' by Music Lovers’ Association of Lalgudi in 1963, 'Padma Shri' by the Government of India in 1972, 'Nada Vidya Rathnakara' by East West Exchange in New York, 'Vadya Sangeetha Kalaratna' by Bharathi Society, New York; 'Sangeetha Choodamani' by Sri Krishna Gana Sabha, Chennai in 1971; State Vidwan of Tamil Nadu by the Government of Tamil Nadu and Sangeetha Natak Academy award in 1979 etc. The First Chowdaiah Memorial National-Level award was given to Sri Jayaraman by the Chief Minister of Karnataka. He also received honorary citizenship of Maryland, US in 1994 and the Padma Bhushan by the Government of India in 2001. He won the National Film Award for Best Music Direction for the film Sringaram in 2006. In 2010, Jayaraman became a fellow of the Sangeet Natak Akademi.

== Personal life ==
Lalgudi Jayaraman was married to Smt Rajalakshmi and had two children, son G.J.R.Krishnan and daughter Lalgudi Vijayalakshmi. Both follow the footsteps of their father and are famous in their own right. Jayaraman had three sisters Padmavathy, a vainika, Rajalakshmi and Srimathi, both violinists. Srimathi learned violin from him as well. The renowned veena player Jayanthi Kumaresh is his sister Smt Rajalakshmi's daughter.

Jayaraman died on 22 April 2013 after suffering a cardiac arrest at his home in Chennai.

== Compositions ==
Most famous for his thillanas and varnams, Sri Lalgudi Jayaraman is considered one of the most prolific composers of modern times. His compositions span four languages (Tamil, Telugu and Sanskrit), as well as a whole range of ragas not conventionally used for varnams or thillanas. Characteristic of his style, the melody of his compositions camouflages subtle rhythmic intricacies. His compositions are very popular with Bharathanatyam dancers, even as they have become a standard highlight of every leading Carnatic musician's repertoire. His compositions include:

=== Varnams ===
Compositions	Raga	Language
Pugalvaay Neyallal Puvitannil	Amritavarshini	Tamil
Thirumaal Marugaa	Andolika	Tamil
Jalajaaksha Nee Paadamé	Asaveri	Telugu
Raamanai Raghunaathanai	Atana	Tamil
Entho Prematonu	Bahudari	Telugu
Arunodayamé Anbin Vadivamé	Bowli	Tamil
Devi un paadamé	Devagandhari	Tamil
Parama karuna	Garudadhvani	Telugu
Innum Tamadaméno Dayapariyé	Hamirkalyani	Tamil
Engum Nirai Déivamé	Hamsavinodini	Tamil
Kannanai Manivannanai Kanindu	Huseni	Tamil
Unnai yandri Verar Ulaginil	Kalyani	Tamil
Inta Tamasamela	Kannada	Telugu
Neevégaani	Mandari	Telugu
Vallabhai nayaka	Mohanakalyani	Tamil
Karunai Puriya Vénum Kamakshi	Mohanam	Tamil
Neevé gatiyani	Nalinakanthi	Telugu
Tarunam En Taye	Saama	Tamil
Parivudan Bhakthargal Anaivarayum	Shankarabharanam	Tamil
Naadaswaroopini Unn Padam Panivom	Saraswathi	Tamil
Chalamu séyanéla	Valaji	Telugu
Nambum Anbarkkarulum	Varamu	Tamil

=== Pada Varnams ===
Compositions	Raga	Language
Innam En Manam	Charukesi	Tamil
Senthil Nagar Mevum	Neelambari	Tamil
Devar Munivar Tozhum	Shanmukhapriya	Tamil
Angayarkanni Anandam Kondale	Ragamalika (Navarasa pada varnam) Ragas: Bilahari, Huseni, Valaji, Saranga, Sucharitra, Athana, Rasikapriya, Sahana, Nadanamakriya	Tamil

=== Thillanas ===
Sri Lalgudi Jayaraman has composed 36 Tillanas listed below.

Compositions	Raga	Talam	Language
Tanata dhim tana dhim dhirana (I dharalo nee paadamé namma léda)	Anandabhairavi	Adi (Tisra Gati)	Telugu
Dhim tanadhim jhanuta dhiranaa (Madhavan maruga malarinai padamé)	Béhag	Adi (Tisra Gati)	Tamil
Tom dru' dru' dhim tadara tadhim (Sundara valliyum surar magalum magil)	Bhageshri	Adi (2 Kalai)	Tamil
Tana dhiranana dhim dhim dhim (Endan ullam ellam kollai konda kumaran)	Bhimpalas	Adi	Tamil
Dhimta dhimta jham jhamta dhirana (Kundram mevum engal gunamaniye)	Bhimpalas	Adi	Tamil
Dhimta jhamta namtajham takadhimta (Indu vadani sankar gouri)	Brindavani	Adi	Tamil
Tatana dhim tadhim tadhirana nadrutani (Aadaritthu arulum annaiye srisaradha)	Chenchurutti	Adi (Tisra Gati)	Tamil
Tom tru' dru' daani dru' dru' dhim (Kola valli kunjari kanava)	Darbari Kannada	Adi	Tamil
Taka dhim ta dhim nadru dhim tatom (Tanjam nin padam dayala)	Desh	Adi (2 Kalai)	Tamil
Tanom tatadhirana tom tom (Cidanande lalitambike naradadi)	Durga	Adi	Sanskrit
Tanom tana tomta dhirana (dru' dru') (Bala gopala yamuna vihara)	Dwijavanthi	Adi	Sanskrit
Dhim dhim takata jhamta tadhirana (Inta varaku jucinadi calada kandasvami)	Hamir Kalyani	Adi (2 Kalai)	Telugu
Dhim dhim dhim tattatana dhimta (Uralodu tavalndu varum selvam)	Hamsanandi	Adi	Tamil
Tanadhim jhamtadhim tanadhirana (Tumbima mugane ninpadam nambinen)	Kathanakuthukalam	Adi	Tamil
Tanana dhirana dhim tadhirana (Madirvarudan mamayilil vara)	Kamas	Tamil	Tamil
Tom dru tani tom dru tani tana dhirana (Vanna malargalum vanam matiyellam)	Kaanada	Adi	Tamil
Tanana dhimta dhim dhim dhirana (Vannamayil erum vadivalagan)	Kapi	Adi (Tisra Gati)	Tamil
Dhim dhim dhim tanam tajham tadhim (Cendru vedarkula mangai vailliye)	Karnaranjani	Adi	Tamil
Tanaddhim tatanadhim dru'dru' (Sivan ulamtanil nirai umai parvathiye)	Kuntalavarali	Adi	Tamil
Tatadhim tadhim jhamta namta tom tru' (Ninaiye enni nidam engidum)	Madhuvanti	Adi	Tamil
Tana dhimta dhimta dhirana tanomta (Unnai caranadainthen om kari gouri)	Misra Mand	Adi	Tamil
Tanadhim tadhim tajhanudhim (Manai thedi vandhu tenaiyundu valli)	Misra Sivaranjani	Adi	Tamil
Taka tajhanu dhimta tajhanu dhimta (Sundara mohana rupam vandita)	Mohana Kalyani	Adi	Sanskrit
Takita tadhim takita tadhim tajhanu (kalingan tan midu kalinadam ceidavar)	Nagarasvaravali	Adi	Tamil
Dhimta dhim dhimtatadhim (Valimai serinda tandavam)	Nalinakanthi	Adi	Tamil
Dhim tanata dhim tanatana dhirana (Mangalakara mahadeva sankara sambho)	Pahadi	Mishra Chapu	Sanskrit
Tanadhim tadhim tanadhirana (Parkadalay karunai poliium parandhamane)	Priyadarsini	Adi (Tisra Gati)	Tamil
Dhimta taratani dhirana dru'dru' (Vela nanu kavumu natana catura)	Ragesri	Adi	Telugu
Dhim dhim tananana dhim dhim (Kola muruganai kana enni)	Revathi	Mishra Chapu	Tamil
Dhimita jhanu jhanuta dhim tana dhimta (Malon marugan murugan cengai)	Sindhu Bhairavi	Adi	Tamil
Dhim dhimta udana dhim dhim tadhirana (Ullam koil kondaruloli)	Tilang	Adi (2 Kalai)	Tamil
Dhim dhim tanana dhirana dhirana (Nidu pada kamalamuna nammiyunnanura)	Vasanta	Khanda Ekam	Telugu
Tam tam taka thom thom taka tadhira (Ninaivil endrum nirainda velava)	Vasanthi	Mishra Chapu	Tamil
Tathdim tanatadhim tom tom (Kandru meyttida ganam pol'ivan)	Yamuna Kalyani	Mishra Chapu	Tamil

Sri Lalgudi Jayaraman also tuned the Swathi Thirunal thillana 'Gitu Dhunika Taka Dhim' in Raga Dhanashree and set the compositions in its current form, which then went on to become hugely popular

=== Krithis ===
Krithi	Ragam	Talam	Language
Sri Jagadeeshwari Durga	Ahir Bhairav	Adi tala	Sanskrit
Nee Dayai Seyyavidil	Begada	Adi tala	Tamil
Vinayakunnadeva	Dharmavati	Adi tala	Telugu
Ten Madurai Vazh Annaye	Hamsaroopini	Adi tala	Tamil
Kandan Seyalandro	Nattakurinji	Roopakam	Tamil
Tavarizhaippadhu En Iyalbandro	Ragavardhini	Adi tala	Tamil
Unnaiyandri Veror Pughazhum Undo	Saramati	Adi tala	Tamil
Kumara Guruguham	Shanmukhapriya	Adi tala	Sanskrit

=== Other Compositions ===
Composition	Ragam	Talam	Language
Jathiswaram - Neeye dayai puriya tarunam	Behag	Adi (2 Kalai)	Tamil
Pushpanjali - Jeku jeku jham tom tom ta dhim	Gambhiranattai	Adi	
Jathiswaram	Rasikapriya	Adi	
Jathiswaram - Mahishan Maindhan annai	Sindhu Bhairavi	Adi (Tisra gathi)	

Apart from these compositions, Sri Lalgudi jayaraman was a much sought after tunesmith who set tunes to numerous songs and compositions including several krithis of Ambujam Krishna.
