= Mohanakalyani =

Janya raga of Carnatic music

- Arohanam: S R₂ G₃ P D₂ Ṡ
- Avarohanam: Ṡ N₃ D₂ P M₂ G₃ R₂ S

Mohanakalyani is a rāgam in Carnatic music (musical scale of South Indian classical music). It is a janya rāgam (derived scale) from the 65th melakarta scale Mechakalyani. It is a janya scale, as it does not have all the seven swaras (musical notes) in the ascending scale. It is a combination of the pentatonic scale Mohanam and the Melakarta raga scale Kalyani. This ragam can be considered as a Prati Madhyamam equivalent of Bilahari, the janya of 29th Melakartha Dheerashankarabharanam. The equivalent of Mohanakalyani in Hindustani music is Bhoop Kalyan or Shuddha Kalyan. Bhoop Kalyan belongs to the Kalyan thaat of Hindustani music. Similar to Mohanakalyani, Bhoop Kalyan is a combination of Bhoop and Kalyan. This rāgam is believed to be invented by Swati Tirunal Maharaja.

== Structure and Lakshana ==
Mohanakalyani is an asymmetric rāgam that does not contain madhyamam or nishādham in the ascending scale. It is an audava-sampurna rāgam (or owdava rāgam, meaning pentatonic ascending scale). Its ārohaṇa-avarohaṇa structure (ascending and descending scale) is as follows:

- ārohaṇa : S R₂ G₃ P D₂ Ṡ (Note: Alternate notations: Hindustani: S R G P D Ṡ; Western: C D E G A C)
- avarohaṇa : Ṡ N₃ D₂ P M₂ G₃ R₂ S (Note: Alternate notations: Hindustani: Ṡ N D P M̄ G R S; Western: C B A G F♯ E D C)

The notes used in this scale are shadjamam, chathusruthi rishabham, antara gandharam, panchamam and chathusruthi dhaivatham in ascending scale, with kakali nishadham and prati madhyamam included in descending scale. For the details of the notations and terms, see swaras in Carnatic music.

== Popular compositions ==
A few compositions have been set to Mohanakalyani rāgam. Here are some popular compositions composed in Mohanakalyani.

- Sangeetha Samrajya Sancharini by Bengaluru Ramamurthy Rao
- Seve Srikantham by Maharaja Swati Tirunal
- Siddhi Vinayakam Seveham and Bhuvaneshwariya by Muthiah Bhagavatar
- Sri Dharma Shastharam by Thulaseevanam R. Ramachandran Nair
- A Tillana by Lalgudi Jayaraman
- A Tillana by Mysore Vasudevachar
- Aadinaye Kanna and En Thai Nee Irukka by Ambujam Krishna
- Thamadham Thaggadhaiyya by Lalgudi Gopala Iyer
- Hariya Bhajane Mado and Baro Murari by Vadiraja Tirtha
- Kamala Mukhiye by Gopala Dasa

== Film Songs ==
=== Language:Tamil ===
Song	Movie	Composer	Singer
Amudhum Thaenum	Thai Pirandhal Vazhi Pirakkum	K. V. Mahadevan	Seerkazhi Govindarajan
Masila Unmai Kathale	Alibabavum 40 Thirudargalum	Susarla Dakshinamurthi	A. M. Rajah, Bhanumathi
Chellakiligalam Paliyile	Enga Mama	M. S. Viswanathan	T. M. Soundararajan
Pudhiya Vaanam	Anbe Vaa	M. S. Viswanathan	T. M. Soundararajan
Ullangal Ondragi	Punar Janmam	T. Chalapathi Rao	A. M. Rajah, P. Susheela
Chinna Chinna Kannile	Then Nilavu	A. M. Rajah	A. M. Rajah, P. Susheela
Thanimaiyile Inimai	Aadi Perukku	A. M. Rajah	A. M. Rajah, P. Susheela
Thullatha Manamum	Kalyana Parisu	A. M. Rajah	Jikki
Thenmalli Poove	Thyagam	Illayaraja	T. M. Soundararajan, S. Janaki
Kaalai Thendral Paadi Varum	Uyarndha Ullam	Illayaraja	P. Susheela
Naan Sirithal	Nayakan	Illayaraja	K. Jamuna Rani, M. S. Rajeswari
Pattu Thalaivan padinal	Idaya Kovil	Illayaraja	S. P. Balasubrahmanyam, S. Janaki
Ohh Party Nalla	Idhayam	Illayaraja	Malaysia Vasudevan
Muthal Mutham	Puthir	Illayaraja	K. J. Yesudas, S. Janaki
Maragatha Veenai	Maragatha Veenai	Illayaraja	K. J. Yesudas, S. Janaki
Paarijatha Poove	En Rasavin Manasile	Illayaraja	S. N. Surendar, K.S. Chitra
Oru Kanam Oru Yugamaga	Nadodi Thendral	Illayaraja	Illayaraja, S. Janaki
Ninaikkatha Neramillai	Thangakkili	Illayaraja	Mano, S. Janaki
Vannila Thennila	Kavithai Paadum Alaigal	Illayaraja	Mano, K.S. Chitra
Keladaa Manida	Bharathi	Illayaraja	Rajkumar Bharathi
Vaanmathiye	Aranmanai Kili	Illayaraja	S. Janaki
Panneeril Nanaintha	Uyire Unakkaga	Laxmikant–Pyarelal	S. Janaki
Uyire Uyire	Iniyavale	Deva	Hariharan, Swarnalatha
Kuku Kuku Kuyile	Aagaya Pookal	Deva	K. J. Yesudas
Kandupidi Avanai Kandupidi (charanam in Ragam Vasanthi)	Unnudan	Deva	S. P. Balasubrahmanyam, Harini
Mudhan Mudhalaga	Engal Anna	Deva	Hariharan, Sadhana Sargam
Ethirveetu Jannal	Oor Mariyadhai	Deva	Malaysia Vasudevan, Krishnaraj
Chinna Veedu Chithra	Thai Poranthachu	Deva	Sabesh
Uyir Vazhgiren	Vaikarai Pookkal	Devendran	S. P. Balasubrahmanyam(vers 1), K. S. Chithra(vers 2)

=== Songs in malayalam ===
Song	Movie	Composer	Singer
Kaalendee theeram thannil	April 18	A. T. Ummer	K. J. Yesudas, S Janakidevi
Maleeyam	Thacholi Varghese Chekavar	Sharreth	K. S. Chitra

== Related rāgams ==
This section covers the theoretical and scientific aspect of this rāgam.

=== Scale similarities ===
- Mohanam has a symmetric pentatonic scale, with the notes same as the ascending scale of Mohanakalyani. Its ārohaṇa-avarohaṇa structure is S R2 G3 P D2 S : S D2 P G3 R2 S
- Bilahari is a rāgam which has the shuddha madhyamam in descending scale (descending scale of Shankarabharanam) in place of the prati madhyamam. Its ārohaṇa-avarohaṇa structure is S R2 G3 P D2 S : S N3 D2 P M1 G3 R2 S
