= Niroshta =

Janya raga of Carnatic music

- Arohanam: S R₂ G₃ D₂ N₃ Ṡ
- Avarohanam: Ṡ N₃ D₂ G₃ R₂ S

Niroshta is a rāgam in Carnatic music (musical scale of South Indian classical music). It is a pentatonic scale (audava/owdava rāgam). It is a derived scale (janya rāgam), as it does not have all the seven swaras (musical notes).

Niroshta literally means without the lips. If the lips do not meet / touch, then the notes Ma and Pa cannot be uttered. This scale does not use either note and hence the name. It is a very pleasing rāgam.

== Structure and Lakshana ==
Niroshta scale with shadjam at C

Niroshta is a symmetric pentatonic scale (audava-audava ragam in Carnatic music classification – audava meaning 'of 5') that does not contain madhyamam and panchamam. Its ārohaṇa-avarohaṇa structure (ascending and descending scale) is as follows (see swaras in Carnatic music for details on below notation and terms):

- ārohaṇa : S R₂ G₃ D₂ N₃ Ṡ (Note: Alternate notations: Hindustani: S R G D N Ṡ; Western: C D E A B C)
- avarohaṇa : Ṡ N₃ D₂ G₃ R₂ S (Note: Alternate notations: Hindustani: Ṡ N D G R S; Western: C B A E D C)

The notes used in this scale are shadjam, chathusruthi rishabham, antara gandharam, chathusruthi dhaivatham and kakali nishadham. Niroshta is considered a janya rāgam of Shankarabharanam, the 29th Melakarta rāgam, though it can be derived from Kalyani by dropping both madhyamam and panchamam. Shankarabharanam is the Major scale of Western music.

== Popular compositions ==
Muthiah Bhagavatar is credited with creating this scale, due to the fact that the King of Mysore had a bee sting in his lip and could not sing the Panchama and Madhyama notes, since the notes touch the lip while pronouncing it. His melodious composition Raja Raja Radhite set to Rupaka tala (3/4 beat) also does not use the syllables Ma and Pa. Madurai T. N. Seshagopalan, a disciple of Ramanathapuram C. S. Sankarasivam, who in turn is a disciple of Muthiah Bhagavatar has composed a thillana in Niroshta "tanana dhirana" in Adi Tala. Tanjavur. S. Kalyanaraman has composed a varnam "Kanin Maniye" in this raga. Other compositions include giri-putrika gaura-varni by Bangalore S Mukund in rupaka talam, jayati jayati jayashankara by Ashok R Madhav in rupaka tala.

== Related rāgams ==
This section covers the theoretical and scientific aspect of this rāgam.

=== Scale similarities ===
- Adbhut Kalyan uses the same notes as Niroshta; Adbhut Kalyan is an unusual variety of the Hindustani raga Yaman used by the Dagar vani that omits madhyamam and panchamam
- Mohanam is a rāgam which has the panchamam in place of the nishadham. Its ārohaṇa-avarohaṇa structure is S R2 G3 P D2 S : S D2 P G3 R2 S
- Hamsadhvani is a rāgam which has the panchamam in place of the dhaivatam. Its ārohaṇa-avarohaṇa structure is S R2 G3 P N3 S : S N3 P G3 R2 S
