= Choodalani Vundi =

- Theatrical poster
- Directed by: Gunasekhar
- Written by: Story & Screenplay: Gunasekhar; Dialogues: Diwakar Babu
- Produced by: C. Aswini Dutt
- Starring: Chiranjeevi; Soundarya; Anjala Zaveri; Prakash Raj
- Cinematography: Chota K. Naidu
- Edited by: Kotagiri Venkateswara Rao
- Music by: Mani Sharma
- Production company: Vyjayanthi Movies
- Release date: 27 August 1998
- Running time: 148 minutes
- Country: India
- Language: Telugu

Choodalani Vundi (transl. I'd like to see) is a 1998 Indian Telugu-language action thriller film co-written and directed by Gunasekhar, and produced by C. Aswani Dutt under Vyjayanthi Movies. This film stars Chiranjeevi, Soundarya, Anjala Zaveri and Prakash Raj. The film has music composed by Mani Sharma with cinematography by Chota K. Naidu.

Released on 27 August 1998, the film was a blockbuster at the box office and became the highest grossing Telugu film of 1998. The film was featured in the Indian Panorama mainstream section at the 30th International Film Festival of India. It received two South Filmfare Awards and three state Nandi Awards. In 2003, it was remade into Hindi as Calcutta Mail.

== Plot ==
Ramakrishna (Chiranjeevi) is a mechanic in Vijayawada whose life changes when he meets Priya (Anjala Zaveri) at a train station. She sees him and feels some inexplicable connection, and then runs away with him to flee her father Mahendra's (Prakash Raj) gangsters. They end up living in the forest with their son, but Mahendra, who is an underworld don, kidnaps her so that he can marry her off to another don's son. Ramakrishna confronts Mahendra, and in the ensuing struggle, Priya takes the bullet shot at Ramakrishna and dies. Their son loses his voice because of the shock, and Ramakrishna is imprisoned because the police have been corrupted by Mahendra, who is running a mafia state. Mahendra kidnaps the boy and takes him to Kolkata, where the story started. Ramakrishna, with the help of Padmavathi (Soundarya), whom he falls in love with, reunites with his son, and kills Mahendra.

== Cast ==
- Chiranjeevi as Ramakrishna
- Soundarya as Padmavathi
- Anjala Zaveri as Priya
- Prakash Raj as Mahendra
- Brahmanandam as House Owner
- Dhulipala as Mahendra's father
- Allu Ramalingaiah
- A.V.S
- Brahmaji as Surya, Mahendra's assistant
- M. Balayya
- M. S. Narayana
- P. J. Sarma
- Ahuti Prasad
- Chalasani Krishna Rao
- Ananth Babu
- Raghunatha Reddy
- Gundu Hanumantha Rao
- Vallabhaneni Janardhan
- Bandla Ganesh
- Venu Madhav
- Sajja Teja as Ramakrishna's son
- Saraswathama
- Lakshmipati
- Monica Bedi (special appearance in the song "Raamma Chilakamma")

== Production ==
After Ramayanam (1997), Gunasekhar wrote Choodalani Vundi as his next film which impressed Aswini Dutt and decided to produce it. The fans of Chiranjeevi initially had mixed feelings since Chiranjeevi and Aswini Dutt was supposed to do a film with Ram Gopal Varma which got shelved and the film's director Gunasekhar was a young director.

The scene where Chiranjeevi conveys his love to Anjala Zaveri at a railway station was shot at Nampally Railway Station. A set resembling a large apartment complex in Calcutta was built at Annapurna Studios. The same location was used to build a Varanasi street set for Vyjayanthi Movies' next collaboration with Chiranjeevi, Indra (2002).

The title Choodalani Vundi was suggested by Chiranjeevi.

== Soundtrack ==
The soundtrack and score were composed by Mani Sharma. The film's single, Yamaha Nagari written by Veturi with the vocals of Hariharan, is a rendition of Patnam Subramania Iyer's carnatic music composition Raghuvamsa Sudha. The song depicts the culture and beauty of the city of Kolkata.

Choodalani Vundi

Soundtrack album by Mani Sharma
- Released: 1998
- Recorded: 1998
- Genre: Soundtrack
- Length: 31:59
- Label: Aditya Music
- Producer: Mani Sharma

Mani Sharma chronology
Ganesh (1998)	Choodalani Vundi (1998)	Manasichi Choodu (1998)

Telugu Track Listing
No.	Title	Lyrics	Singer(s)	Length
1.	"Yamaha Nagari"	Veturi	Hariharan	6:43
2.	"Ramma Chilakammma"	Veturi	Udit Narayan, Swarnalatha	4:47
3.	"Oh Mariya"	Chandrabose	Shankar Mahadevan, Kavitha Krishnamurthy	5:52
4.	"Simbale Simbale"	Veturi	S. P. Balasubrahmanyam, Chithra	4:37
5.	"Manasa Ekkadunnav"	Veturi	S. P. Balasubrahmanyam, Chithra	5:02
6.	"Abbaba Iddu"	Veturi	S. P. Balasubrahmanyam, Sujatha	4:58
Total length:				31:59

Tamil Track Listing
No.	Title	Singer(s)	Length
1.	"Namathu Nagaram"	Unni Krishnan	6:43
2.	"Vamma Muniyamma"	Mano, Swarnalatha	4:47
3.	"Oh Mariyaa"	Mano, Anuradha Sriram	5:52
4.	"Kanniley kanniley"	Krishnaraj, Chithra	4:37
5.	"Uthathu than"	S. P. Balasubrahmanyam, Chithra	5:02
6.	"Appappa satham"	Unni Krishnan, S.P. Sailaja	4:58
Total length:			31:59

== Reception ==
Giddaluri Gopalrao of Zamin Ryot gave a positive review for the film. He praised Chiranjeevi for picking up a new theme and Gunasekhar for executing it. Christopher Domingo of Full Hyderabad opined that "Choodalani Vundi is an entertaining masala movie that is worth watching".

The film became a commercial success and had a theatrical run of 100 days. The film was dubbed into Tamil language under the title Calcutta and twice in Hindi as Meri Zindagi Ek Agneepath in 2005 and 2018.

== Awards ==
Filmfare Awards

- Filmfare Award for Best Music Director – Telugu – Mani Sharma
- Filmfare Award for Best Art Director – South – Thota Tharani

Nandi Awards

- Best Music Director – Mani Sharma
- Best Audiographer – Madhu Sudhan
- Best Choreographer – Saroj Khan
