= Sringaram =

- Film poster
- Directed by: Sharada Ramanathan
- Screenplay by: Indra Soundar Rajan
- Story by: Sharada Ramanathan
- Produced by: Golden Square Films
- Starring: Aditi Rao Hydari; Manoj K. Jayan; Hamsa Moily; Sashikumar Subramani; Y. Gee. Mahendra
- Cinematography: Madhu Ambat
- Edited by: A. Sreekar Prasad
- Music by: Lalgudi Jayaraman
- Production company: Golden Square Films
- Distributed by: GV Films
- Release date: 5 October 2007
- Running time: 117 minutes
- Country: India
- Language: Tamil

Sringaram is a 2007 Indian Tamil-language period drama film directed by debutante Sharada Ramanathan, a cultural activist. Co-written by novelist Indra Soundar Rajan, it stars Aditi Rao Hydari, in her Tamil film debut, in the lead role alongside Manoj K. Jayan, Hamsa Moily and Y. Gee. Mahendra. The film depicts the life of a Devadasi during the 1920s. Sringaram became highly critically acclaimed, winning three prizes at the 53rd National Film Awards and two Tamil Nadu State Film Awards, besides several screenings at various international film festivals, much before its theatrical release on 5 October 2007.

== Plot ==
The story begins with a Bharathanatiyam dancer, Varshini, being invited to the national capital of India on the eve of India being declared a republic. The temple priest who has nurtured since her birth takes her to the Brihadeeshvara Temple to meet a temple dancer named Kama. The story then flashes back to the 1920s. The temple dancer is about to retire from her service as a dancer and has chosen her daughter Madhura as her descendant. The vassal of the Tanjavore Presidency is attracted to Madhura. In addition to being a temple dancer, Madhura has to satisfy the vassal's desires. Madhura is more interested in developing her art of dancing. Meanwhile, Shiva, a lower caste temple servant has awe for Madhura's art. He threatens the vassal for an attempt to murder by a rebellious group called "Vande Mataram". But things don't go so and Shiva is accused of lying. He is sent into an exile but eventually mixes with the same group "Vande Mataram". In order to broaden his prospects, the vassal asks Madhura to seduce the collector of Tanjavore through her art. Madhura rejects thus decision and disappears. Now, Kama, Madhura's sister, is chosen as the temple dancer. Learning the barbaric thoughts of the vassal, Kama chooses to elope like Madhura. She finds that Madhura is a part of the rebellious "Vande Mataram" group. Things become more complicated as the sacred thread from temple goes missing. Madhura is accused of stealing and the vassal orders her arrest. Shiva confesses to the policemen that he is the real accused but secretly tells Madhura where had he kept the sacred thread. Shiva is hanged to death for the charges of robbery. Madhura is pregnant and dies while giving birth to her child. The child is none other than Varshini herself. She is a look alike of Madhura. The story then comes to the present where it is revealed that the vassal has invited Varshini to the national capital. Kama tells Varshini that her mother's last wish was to be cremated with the holy temple fire. The film ends with Varshini, wearing the sacred thread, cremating her mother with the holy temple fire and dancing to pay homage to her mother's artiste.

== Cast ==
- Aditi Rao Hydari as Madhura and Varshini
- Manoj K. Jayan as Sukumar, the Mirasu
- Hamsa Moily as Kama
- Sashikumar Subramani as Kasi
- Manju Bhargavi as Ponammal
- Y. Gee. Mahendra as the Gurukkal
- Aishwarya as Mirasu's wife
- Vagai Chandrasekhar as Kangani
- Bharat Kalyan as Manisundaram
- Sindhu as Saroja
- Junior Balaiah as Koilpillai
- Lakshmi Ravi as Ambujam

== Soundtrack ==
The film's score and soundtrack were composed by renowned legendary violinist Padma Bhushan Sri Lalgudi Jayaraman. The soundtrack album features 14 tracks, most of them sung by carnatic musicians. Lyrics were penned by Swati VAR. Jayaraman eventually won a National Film Award for Best Music Direction for the film's score. Sringaram is notably his first and till date only work for a feature film.

1. "Title Music
2. "Mallari" – Injukkudi Brothers
3. "Nattu Purappadal" (Folk Song) – T. L. Maharajan & O. S. Arun
4. "Yen Indha Mayamo" (Hamir Kalyani) – Bombay Jayashri Ramnath
5. "Mudal Mariyadai" (Salutation) – Swati Srikrishna & Hamsi
6. "Mamara Thopila" – O. S. Arun
7. "Ninaival Yennai" – Lalgudi Vijayalakshmi
8. "Three Seasons" – GJR Krishnan, Lalgudi Vijayalakshmi, Swati, Revathy Meera & Orchestra
9. "Yen Indha Mayamo" (Hamir Kalyani – Solo) – S. Sowmya
10. "Akaram" – Swati Srikrishna & Hamsi
11. "Mudal Mariyadai" (Salutation) – Swati Srikrishna & Hamsi
12. "Nattu Purappadal" (Folk Song) – T. L. Maharajan & O. S. Arun
13. "Harathi" – Swati Srikrishna, Meera & Hamsi
14. "Three Seasons" – GJR Krishnan, Lalgudi Vijayalakshmi, Swati, Revathy Meera & Orchestra

== Reception ==
A critic from Rediff.com wrote that "Sringaram is truly a feast for the senses". A critic from Chennai Online wrote that the film is an "ideal viewing for a discerning viewer who looks out for something different, meaningful and rooted to the soil, than the mindless, run-of-the-mill stuff churned out regularly".

== Accolades ==
53rd National Film Awards

- Best Cinematography – Madhu Ambat
- Best Music Direction – Lalgudi Jayaraman
- Best Choreography – Saroj Khan

Tamil Nadu State Film Awards 2005

- Best Art Direction – Thotta Tharani
- Best Costume Design – Rukmini Krishnan

The film was screened at following film festivals:

- 37th International Film Festival of India (IFFI)
- 8th Dubai International Film Festival
- Adelaide OzAsia Festival 2008
- 4th Indian Film Festival of Los Angeles
- Kerala Film Festival
- Thrissur International Film Festival
- 2nd India International Women Film Festival
- Dance on Camera Festival 2006
- 3rd Indo-German Film Festival
