= Garudadhvani =

Janya raga of Carnatic music

- Arohanam: S R₂ G₃ M₁ P D₂ N₃ Ṡ
- Avarohanam: Ṡ D₂ P G₃ R₂ S

Garudadhvani or Garudadhwani is a rāgam in Carnatic music (musical scale of South Indian classical music). It is a janya rāgam (derived scale) from the 29th melakarta scale Shankarabharanam. It is a janya scale, as it does not have all the seven swaras (musical notes) in the descending scale. It is a combination of the sampurna raga scale Shankarabharanam and the pentatonic scale Mohanam.

== Structure and Lakshana ==
Ascending scale with shadjam at C, which is same as Shankarabharanam scale

Descending scale with shadjam at C, which is same as Mohanam scale

Garudadhvani is an asymmetric rāgam that does not contain madhyamam or nishādham in the descending scale. It is an sampurna-audava rāgam (or owdava rāgam, meaning pentatonic descending scale). Its ārohaṇa-avarohaṇa structure (ascending and descending scale) is as follows:

- ārohaṇa : S R₂ G₃ M₁ P D₂ N₃ Ṡ (Note: Alternate notations: Hindustani: S R G M P D N Ṡ; Western: C D E F G A B C)
- avarohaṇa : Ṡ D₂ P G₃ R₂ S (Note: Alternate notations: Hindustani: Ṡ D P G R S; Western: C A G E D C)

The notes used in this scale are shadjam, chathusruthi rishabham, antara gandharam, shuddha madhyamam, panchamam, chathusruthi dhaivatham and kakali nishadham in ascending scale, with kakali nishadham and shuddha madhyamam skipped in descending scale. For the details of the notations and terms, see swaras in Carnatic music.

This raga has shades of western music when played in fast pace. Most of the notes are used without gamaka (without variation of pitch, oscillation around the notes or any analogous transitions between notes).

== Popular compositions ==
There are many compositions set to Garudadhvani rāgam. Here are some popular kritis composed in Garudadhvani.

- Anandasagara and Tatvameruga composed by Tyagaraja
- Garudavahana, Sri Bhavam Chinmayam Vande and Rajarajeswari by Muthiah Bhagavatar
- Emi Neramu by Karur Dakshinamurthy
- A Tillana by Dr. M. Balamuralikrishna
- A Varnam (Adi tala) by Lalgudi Jayaraman
- A Nottuswara by Neyveli Santhanagopalan

== Related rāgams ==
This section covers the theoretical and scientific aspect of this rāgam.

=== Scale similarities ===
- Mohanam has a symmetric pentatonic scale, with the notes same as the descending scale of Garudadhvani. Its ārohaṇa-avarohaṇa structure is S R2 G3 P D2 S : S D2 P G3 R2 S
- Bilahari is a rāgam which has the ascending and descending scales interchanged, in comparison with Garudadhvani. Its ārohaṇa-avarohaṇa structure is S R2 G3 P D2 S : S N3 D2 P M1 G3 R2 S
