= Patnam Subramania Iyer =

Indian composer (1845–1902)

- Born: 1845; Thiruvaiyaru, Thanjavur, India
- Died: 31 July 1902 (aged 56–57)
- Occupations: Musician, composer
- Known for: Carnatic music
- Notable work: Raghuvamsa Sudha, Evari Bodhanna, Valachi Vacchi, Era Napai, Paridhanamichithe

Patnam Subramania Iyer (1845 – July 31, 1902) was a composer and singer of Carnatic music. Subramaniya Iyer followed the traditions of the great composer Tyagaraja. He has left behind almost one hundred compositions.

Subramaniya Iyer was born in Thiruvaiyaru in Thanjavur district of present-day Tamil Nadu. His family had a long history of musical involvement – his father Bharatam Vaidyanatha Iyer was adept at both music and Sastra and his grandfather Panchanada Sastri was the court musician in the court of Serfoji Maharaja of Thanjavur. Subramaniya Iyer learned music from his uncle, Melattur Ganapati Sastri, and later under Manambuchavadi Venkatasubbayyar who was a disciple of Tyagaraja himself.

Subramaniya Iyer spent a long time in Chennapatnam (Chennai). This gave Subramaniya Iyer the prefix to his name. Many of his students such as Mysore Vasudevachar, Poochi Srinivasa Iyengar, Bhairavi Kempegowda and Tiger Varadachariar became famous composers and vocalists. His neighbour Maha Vaidyanatha Iyer was also a noted musician.

Two of his famous compositions are Raghu Vamsha Sudha in raga Kathanakuthuhalam and Evari Bodhanna in raga Abhogi. He is known to have used his guru's mudra (signature) Venkatesa or variations of the same, in his compositions in Telugu and Sanskrit.

The reigning Maharaja of Mysore, Chamarajendra Wodeyar X, gave him a pair of golden bracelets on two occasions, after singing performances in court.

== Music compositions ==
=== Varnams ===
| Composition | Raga | Tala | Language |
|---|---|---|---|
| Evari Bodhanna | Abhogi | Adi tala | Telugu |
| Palumaru | Nattai | Adi tala | Telugu |
| Sami Ninne | Nattai | Adi tala | Telugu |
| Valachi Vacchi | Navaragamalika | Adi tala | Telugu |
| Palumaru | Devamanohari | Adi tala | Telugu |
| Jalajakshi | Chakravakam | Adi tala | Telugu |
| Evvaremi | Sahana | Ata | Telugu |
| Niluparani Mohamuto | Shankarabharanam | Ata | Telugu |
| Dari Teliyaka | Darbar | Ata | Telugu |
| Manasetiki | Saveri | Ata | Telugu |
| Nenaru Leni | Balahamsa | Ata | Telugu |
| Sami Ninne | Atana | Adi tala | Telugu |
| Marachitlunde | Begada | Ata | Telugu |
| Samini Vegame Rammanave | Nattakurinji | Ata | Telugu |
| Sami Idi Vela | Kannada | Adi tala | Telugu |
| Pagavari | Hamsadhvani | Adi tala | Telugu |
| Thamasinchuka | Asaveri | Adi tala | Telugu |
| Chalamela Jesevu | Keeravani | Adi tala | Telugu |
| Era Napai | Hanumatodi | Adi tala | Telugu |

=== Kritis ===
| Composition | Raga | Tala | Language |
|---|---|---|---|
| Maravakave O Manasa | Sama | Rupaka | Telugu |
| Garuda Gamana Samayamide | Nagasvaravali | Rupaka | Telugu |
| Inthakante Kavalena | Kannada | Rupaka | Telugu |
| Nannu Brova Rada Rama | Bhairavam | Rupaka | Telugu |
| Nijadasa Varada | Kalyani | Adi | Sanskrit |
| Palaya Sri Panchanadheeshwara | Shankarabharanam | Adi | Sanskrit |
| Samayamide Nannu Brova | Kedaram | Rupaka | Telugu |
| Manasu Karugademi | Hamsadhwani | Rupaka | Telugu |
| Marachedi Nyayama | Hamsadhwani | Adi | Telugu |
| Idi Nyayama | Malavi | Adi | Telugu |
| Ennadu Daya | Balahamsa | Rupaka | Telugu |
| Palukutache Phalamemi | Phalamanjari | Rupaka | Telugu |
| Sri Venkatesha | Phalamanjari | Adi | Telugu |
| Manasa Vrutha | Abhogi | Adi | Telugu |
| Eppudu Kripa Galguno | Mukhari | Adi | Telugu |
| Etu Namminaavo | Saveri | Adi | Telugu |
| Entha Nerchina | Saveri | Adi | Telugu |
| Karuninchutakide Samayamayya | Sindhu Mandari | Adi | Telugu |
| Sankalpam Ettido | Kharaharapriya | Adi | Telugu |
| Kanna Tandri Neeve | Narayani | Adi | Telugu |
| Nee Padamule Gathiyani | Bhairavi | Adi | Telugu |
| Ennaadu Nee Kripa | Vachaspati | Adi | Telugu |
| Marivere Dikkevarayya Rama | Shanmukhapriya | Adi | Telugu |
| Marivere Dikkevaru | Latangi | Khanda Chapu | Telugu |
| Aparadhamulanniyu | Latangi | Adi | Telugu |
| Abimanamennadu | Begada | Adi | Telugu |
| Manasu Nera | Begada | Rupaka | Telugu |
| Korina Vara | Ramapriya | Rupaka | Telugu |
| Dhanyudevvado (Disuputed) | Malayamarutam | Adi | Telugu |
| Janmam Enduku | Malayamarutam | Adi | Telugu |
| Ninnu Jeppa Karanamemi | Mandari | Khanda Chapu | Telugu |
| Endhukitu Chapalamu | Mandari | Viloma Chapu | Telugu |
| Panchanadheesha Pahimam | Poornachandrika | Rupaka | Sanskrit |
| Ne Jesina Neramu | Poornachandrika | Adi | Telugu |
| Rama Ika Nannu | Sahana | Rupaka | Telugu |
| Sri Panchanadheesham | Sahana | Rupaka | Sanskrit |
| Paridhanamichithe | Bilahari | Khanda Chapu | Telugu |
| Raghuvamsa Sudha | Kathanakuthuhalam | Adi | Sanskrit |
| Inka Dayaraledha | Chakravakam | Adi | Telugu |
| Varamulosagi Brochuta | Keeravani | Rupaka | Telugu |
| Manavi Chekonavayya | Sarasangi | Rupaka | Telugu |
| Ninnu Joochi | Sowrashtram | Adi | Telugu |
| Naravara Raghunandana | Manirangu | Rupaka | Telugu |
| Karuninchara Karunanidhe | Huseni | Adi tala | Telugu |

=== Javalis ===
| Composition | Raga | Tala | Language |
|---|---|---|---|
| Appudu Manasu | Khamas | Rupaka | Telugu |
| Ra Rammani | Behag | Adi tala | Telugu |
| Samayamide Gadura | Mayamalavagowla | Adi tala | Telugu |
| Samayamide Rara | Behag | Rupaka | Telugu |
| Mariyada Teliyakane | Surutti | Rupaka | Telugu |
| Kanukontini | Shubhapantuvarali | Adi tala | Telugu |

=== Tillanas ===
| Raga | Tala | Language |
|---|---|---|
| Paras | Adi tala | Telugu |
| Khamas | Adi tala | Telugu |

=== Swarajatis ===
| Composition | Raga | Tala | Language |
|---|---|---|---|
| Rara Venugopabala | Bilahari | Adi | Telugu |

== See also ==
- List of Carnatic composers
