= Jana Ranjani =

Janya raga in Carnatic music

- Arohanam: S R₂ G₃ M₁ P D₂ P N₃ Ṡ
- Avarohanam: Ṡ D₂ P M₁ R₂ S

Jana Ranjani is a raga in Carnatic music, the classical music of South India. It is a janya raga of Shankarabharanam, the 29th of the 72 melakarta ragas. The raga is named thus because it induces a feeling of enjoyment (Jana – People and Ranjani – can be enjoyed by people) among the rasikas (audience).

== Structure and Lakshana ==
It is a Vakra sampoorna – Audava ragam i.e. the ascending scale has all the notes in a zig-zag manner and the descending scale has five notes. Its Arohana–Avarohana structure is as follows:

Arohana: S R₂ G₃ M₁ P D₂ P N₃ Ṡ (Note: Alternate notations: Hindustani: S R G M P D P N Ṡ; Western: C D E F G A G B C)

Avarohana: Ṡ D₂ P M₁ R₂ S (Note: Alternate notations: Hindustani: Ṡ D P M R S; Western: C A G F D C)

== Related ragas ==
Janaranjani is very similar to Poornachandrika and these Ragas are known as twin Ragas. Unless sung with perfect sangathis and pidis, it is highly difficult to differentiate between the two.
