= T. L. Venkatarama Iyer =

Indian judge and musician (1893–1971)

Hon'ble Mr. Justice T. L. Venkatarama Iyer
- Iyer in 1954

Third president of the Madras Music Academy
- In office 1965 – 2 January 1971
- Preceded by: K. V. Krishnaswami Iyer
- Succeeded by: T. S. Rajam

Chairman, 2nd Law Commission of India
- In office 1958–1961
- Appointed by: Rajendra Prasad
- Prime Minister: J. L. Nehru
- Preceded by: M. C. Setalvad (1st)
- Succeeded by: Jeevan Lal Kapur (3rd)

Judge of the Supreme Court of India
- In office 4 January 1954 – 24 November 1958
- Nominated by: M. Patanjali Sastri
- Appointed by: Rajendra Prasad

Judge of the Madras High Court
- In office 7 January 1951 – 24 November 1953
- Appointed by: Rajendra Prasad

Personal details
- Born: 25 November 1893
- Died: 2 January 1971 (aged 77)

Tirunelveli Lakshmanasuri Venkatarama Iyer (25 November 1893 – 2 January 1971) was a judge of the Supreme Court of India, a Carnatic musician, and a musicologist.

== Early life ==
T. L. Venkatarama Iyer was born in Harikesanallur, Tamil Nadu, India. He was a close relative of Harikesanallur Muthiah Bhagavatar and a disciple of Ambi Dikshitar (a grand-nephew of Muthuswami Dikshitar).

== Law ==
Iyer graduated from Madras Christian Law College in 1916. After doing an apprenticeship under Alladi Krishnaswamy Iyer, he started practicing at the Madras High Court in 1917. He became a judge in 1951 and served until 1953. From 1954 to 1958, he served as a judge of the Supreme Court of India.

== Music ==
Iyer was a Carnatic musician, and a musicologist. Beginning in 1965, he served as the third president of the Madras Music Academy until his death, in 1971.

=== Publication ===
An authority on Muthuswami Dikshitar's compositions, Iyer published The Life of Muthuswami Dikshitar.

== Awards ==
- Sangita Kalanidhi, conferred by the Madras Music Academy in 1944
