= Mysore Vasudevachar =

Background information
- Born: 28 May 1865; Kingdom of Mysore
- Died: 17 May 1961 (aged 95)
- Genre: Carnatic
- Occupations: Composer, lyricist, instrumentalist
- Instrument: Vocals

Mysore Vasudevachar (28 May 1865 – 17 May 1961) was an Indian musician and composer of Carnatic music compositions who belonged to the direct line of Tyagaraja's disciples. Vasudevachar's compositions (numbering over 200) were mostly in Telugu and Sanskrit. Some of his most popular kritis include Brochevarevarura in Khamas raga, Devadideva in Sunadavinodini, Mamavatu Sri Saraswati in Hindolam, Shankari Ninne in Pantuvarali, Bhajare Re Manasa in Abheri and Ra Ra Rajeevalochana Rama in Mohanam. He presided over Madras Music Academy's annual conference in 1935, when the Sangeetha Kalanidhi award did not exist. But everybody who presided over the annual conference in the 1930s was later conferred the award. He was a recipient of the civilian honour of the Padma Bhushan.

He is credited with two writings in Kannada, one of them an autobiography called Nenapugalu (memories) and Na Kanda Kalavidaru (the musicians I have met) in which he wrote the biographies of many well known musicians. Mysore Vasudevachar also taught in Rukmini Devi's Kalakshetra, (founded in 1936). He was already quite old by then, but thanks to Rukmini Devi he agreed to shift to Kalakshetra. He became the chief musician in Kalakshetra and helped in setting the Ramayana to music. He died in 1961 at the age of 96. He lived a simple and austere life devoted to the study of Sanskrit and music.

S. Rajaram, his grandson, worked at Kalakshetra, eventually taking charge of the institution at Rukmini Devi's request. Vasudevachar had composed the music for only the first four kandas and it was left to Rajaram to finish the work. An accomplished musician and Sanskrit scholar, he was amongst the few musicians, the sole repository of Vasudevacharya's compositions. S. Krishnamurthy (1922–2015), his other grandson worked at All India Radio and translated his Vasudevachar's memoirs into English. He has also published a memoir of his own.

== Early life ==
Vasudevacharya was born into an orthodox Madhwa Brahmin family in Mysore. He started learning music from Veena Padmanabhiah, the chief musician of the royal court of Mysore. He also mastered Sanskrit and allied fields such as Kavya, Vyakarana, Nataka, Alankaram, Tarka, Itihasa, Purana while studying at the Maharaja Sanskrit College in Mysore while learning music privately.

He then went on to learn from the famous composer-musician Patnam Subramania Iyer, supported by the Maharaja's generous stipend. He imbibed the music of not only his guru but also other great maestros of the Thanjavur-Cauvery delta region. Vasudevacharya eventually became the chief court musician (Asthana Vidwan) at the royal court of Mysore. He was known for his madhyama-kala tanam singing, which he learnt from his guru. Patnam Subramania Iyer often requested his sishya "Vasu" to help him with the sahitya (lyric) aspects of his compositions. This aspect of his training undoubtedly helped Vasudevacharya as a composer. He was adept in all the aspects of Carnatic music especially Ragam Alapanam, Tanam, Neraval and Kalpanaswaram.

== Career ==
He published a large number of his compositions in the book Vasudeva Kirtana Manjari. His compositions in Telugu have such sweetness and lilt, and beautifully blend with the tune of the raga as do the Sanskrit compositions, which are mellifluous. His songs reflect his mastery of Sanskrit and show his erudition and scholarship in Sanskrit literature. He considered his insight into Telugu as a gift from Tyagaraja (Tyagaraja's bhiksha). Unlike the Dasa kuta songs, his compositions don't have any Dvaita undertones but many have the words "Paramapurusha Vasudeva" or "Vasudeva" which means the supreme Vasudeva/Lord Vishnu which incidentally is also his mudra or signature.

True to his Vaishnava heritage and the Thyagaraja shishya parampara to which he belonged, most of his compositions are in praise of Lord Rama. In addition to Kritis and Keertanas, he also composed Varnams, Thillanas, Javalis and slokas. His admiration for the trinity of Carnatic music specially Thyagaraja resulted in Srimadadi Thyagaraja Guruvaram in Kalyani, Shri Ramachandra (a ragamalika) and two other ragamalikas in praise of Muthuswami Dikshitar and Shyama Sastri. Vasudevachar's compositions are thus like sugar candy which gives one instant pleasure and yet lingers on in the mind and heart long after.

== Compositions ==
Composition	Raga	Tala	Type	Language	Audio Links
Nannubrova rada	Madhyamavati	Adi		Telugu	
Mama hrudaye	Reetigowla	Kanda Jati Triputa tala		Sanskrit	
Marachitive	Purvikalyani	Adi		Telugu	
Pranamamyaham	Gowla	Adi		Sanskrit	
Bhajana Seyarada Sriramuni	Dharmavati	Rupaka		Telugu	Vairamangalam Lakshminarayanan (Part 1); Vairamangalam Lakshminarayanan (Part 2)
Brochevaarevarura	Khamas (raga)	Adi		Telugu	K J Yesudas; MS Subbulakshmi; Mangalampalli Balamurali Krishna; Bombay Sisters; G. N. Balasubramaniam
Vanajaksha- Varnam	Mandari	Adi		Telugu	
Lambodaramavalambe	Kambhoji	Rupaka		Telugu	
Girija ramana natajana sharana	Gambhiranata	Adi		Sanskrit	Vani Sateesh
Gokula Nilaya	Abheri	Adi		Sanskrit	TM Krishna
Mamavatu sri sarasvati	Hindolam	Adi		Sanskrit	Priya Sisters; Sudha Raghunathan
Mari Mari Vaccuna Manava Janma	Kambhoji	Adi		Telugu	
Nikela Daya Radu Ramachandra	Kadana Kutuhalam	Adi		Telugu	
Nimishamaina Sri Ramayana Rada	Sama	Adi		Telugu	
Ninne Nammitinayya Sri Rama	Simhendramadhyamam	Misra chapu		Telugu	
Ra Ra Rajeeva Lochana	Mohanam	Adi		Telugu	
vara lakshmi namostute	Gowrimanohari	Rupaka		Sanskrit	
Sri Chamundeshvari	Bilahari	Adi		Sanskrit	
Devi Kamalalaye	Garudadhwani	Adi		Sanskrit	
Shankari Ninne	Kamavardhini	Misra Chapu		Sanskrit	
Bhajare Re Manasa	Abheri	Adi		Sanskrit	S Sowmya
RamaNeeDayaradha	Bhairavi	Misrachapu			
Pranamami	Keeravani	ChatusraTriputa			Swara-sahitya available in Sudesamitran edition dated 1958 February 23
SambhoSankara	KedaraGowla	ChatusraTriputa			Swara-sahitya available in Sudesamitran edition dated 1957 October 13
ManasaVachasa	Begada	ChatusraTriputa			Swara-sahitya available in Sudesamitran edition dated 1958 May 4
VamanaManisam	Naayagi	ChatusraTriputa			Swara-sahitya available in Sudesamitran edition dated 1957 July 14
Madhusudana	Natakurinji	ThisraTriputa			Swara-sahitya available in Sudesamitran edition dated 1957 August 4
Namamyaham	Bilahari	ChatusraRoopakam			Swara-sahitya available in Sudesamitran edition dated 1957 May 5
SriKesava	Bhairavi	ChatusraRoopakam			
BhajaMadhava	Hindustani Kaapi	Aadhi			Swara-sahitya available in Sudesamitran edition dated 1957 September 1
Sangarshana	Aabhogi	ChatusraRoopakam			Swara-sahitya available in Sudesamitran edition dated 1958 Jan 19
IdhiNeeku	Kamanashrama	Misrachapu			Swara-sahitya available in Sudesamitran edition dated 1956 Oct 7
SathathamSri	Kalyani	Aadhi			Swara-sahitya available in Sudesamitran edition dated 1957 Oct 27
Upendra	Kamaas	ChatusraTriputa			Swara-sahitya available in Sudesamitran edition dated 1958 Jun 9
Inthaparakela	Kamaas	ChatusraRoopakam			
Paripahimam	Kaanada	Aadhi			Swara-sahitya available in Sudesamitran edition dated 1957 Mar 3
Vasudeva	Kaanada	Kantatriputa			Swara-sahitya available in Sudesamitran edition dated 1958 Feb 9
Thrivikrama	Kambhoji	ChatusraTriputa			Swara-sahitya available in Sudesamitran edition dated 1956 Mar 11
Srimadhadhi	Kalyani	Roopakam			Swara-sahitya available in Sudesamitran edition dated 1956 Jan 29
Neekendhuku	SimhendraMadhyamam	ChatusraTriputa			Swara-sahitya available in Sudesamitran edition dated 1955 Nov 27
SmaraBhoomi	Megaranjani	Aadhi			Swara-sahitya available in Sudesamitran edition dated 1955 Jul 24
Kalinarulagu	Mayamalavagowla	ChatusraTriputa			Swara-sahitya available in Sudesamitran edition dated 1958 Aug 24
Srivasudeva	Ramapriya	Thisraroopakam			Swara-sahitya available in Sudesamitran edition dated 1958 Sep 28
Maamavaasu	Saama	ChatusraRoopakam			Swara-sahitya available in Sudesamitran edition dated 1956 Jul 15
Purushothama	Saveri	ChatusraRoopakam			Swara-sahitya available in Sudesamitran edition dated 1958 Mar 23
Pranamatha	Kaanada	ChatusraTriputa			Swara-sahitya available in Sudesamitran edition dated 1956 Nov 25
Paahimam	Thodi	ChatusraTriputa			Swara-sahitya available in Sudesamitran edition dated 1957 Feb 17
Brovamma	GowriManohari	Thisraroopakam			Swara-sahitya available in Sudesamitran edition dated 1957 Jan 20
Saradhe	Yadukulakambhoji	ChatusraTriputa			Swara-sahitya available in Sudesamitran edition dated 1956 Aug 19
Ganasudha	Karaharapriya	Aadhi			Swara-sahitya available in Sudesamitran edition dated 1956 Apr 22
Ragavendra	Darbar	Kantatriputa			Swara-sahitya available in Sudesamitran edition dated 1956 Jan 8
Bhavayeham	Behag	Aadhi			Swara-sahitya available in Sudesamitran edition dated 1956 Apr 15
PahiKrishna	Behag	ChatusraRoopakam			Swara-sahitya available in Sudesamitran edition dated 1958 Aug 3
NinnuvinaNannu	Bhairavi	ChatusraTriputa			Swara-sahitya available in Sudesamitran edition dated 1956 Jun 3
SivePaahi	Suruti	Kantatriputa			Swara-sahitya available in Sudesamitran edition dated 1958 Dec 21
Sridhara	Jayanthasri	ChatusraRoopakam			
Dayaledhemi	SimhendraMadhyamam	ChatusraTriputa			Swara-sahitya available in Sudesamitran edition dated 1958 Oct 26
Varamulosaki Suddasaveri	SuddhaSaveri	ChatusraTriputa			
HarePariPahi	Kedaram	ChatusraTriputa			Swara-sahitya available in Sudesamitran edition dated 1958 Jul 20
NeeKabhimanamu	Kokilapriya	ChatusraTriputa			Swara-sahitya available in Sudesamitran edition dated 1956 Apr 1
Janardhanam	Chakravaham	Kantatriputa			Swara-sahitya available in Sudesamitran edition dated 1958 Jun 15
NeeDayaEtula	Sankarabharanam	Aadhi			
KarunaPayoNidhe	Suruti	ChatusraTriputa			Swara-sahitya available in Sudesamitran edition dated 1957 Sep 15
ParipahimamSri	Dhanyasi	ChatusraTriputa			Swara-sahitya available in Sudesamitran edition dated 1956 Dec 9
SrivasudevaSri	Devagandhari	Thisraroopakam			Swara-sahitya available in Sudesamitran edition dated 1957 Nov 10
Karuninchi	NavarasaKannada	Aadhi			Swara-sahitya available in Sudesamitran edition dated 1955 Jul 31
KaruninchiBrova	Budharanjani	Aadhi			
DevakiThanaya	Pushpalatha	ChatusraRoopakam			Swara-sahitya available in Sudesamitran edition dated 1955 Dec 25
GurukripaLeka	Pushpalatha	Thisraroopakam			Swara-sahitya available in Sudesamitran edition dated 1956 Jan 22
Neekentha	Bhavapriya	Aadhi			Swara-sahitya available in Sudesamitran edition dated 1956 May 20
NeePaadamu	Nayaki	ChatusraTriputa			
IdhiSamayamu	Natakapriya	ChatusraRoopakam			Swara-sahitya available in Sudesamitran edition dated 1956 Mar 25
EnthaNinne	Naatakurinji	ChatusraTriputa			Swara-sahitya available in Sudesamitran edition dated 1956 Dec 23

== See also ==
- List of Carnatic composers
