= Sharada Ramanathan =

Indian journalist and film director

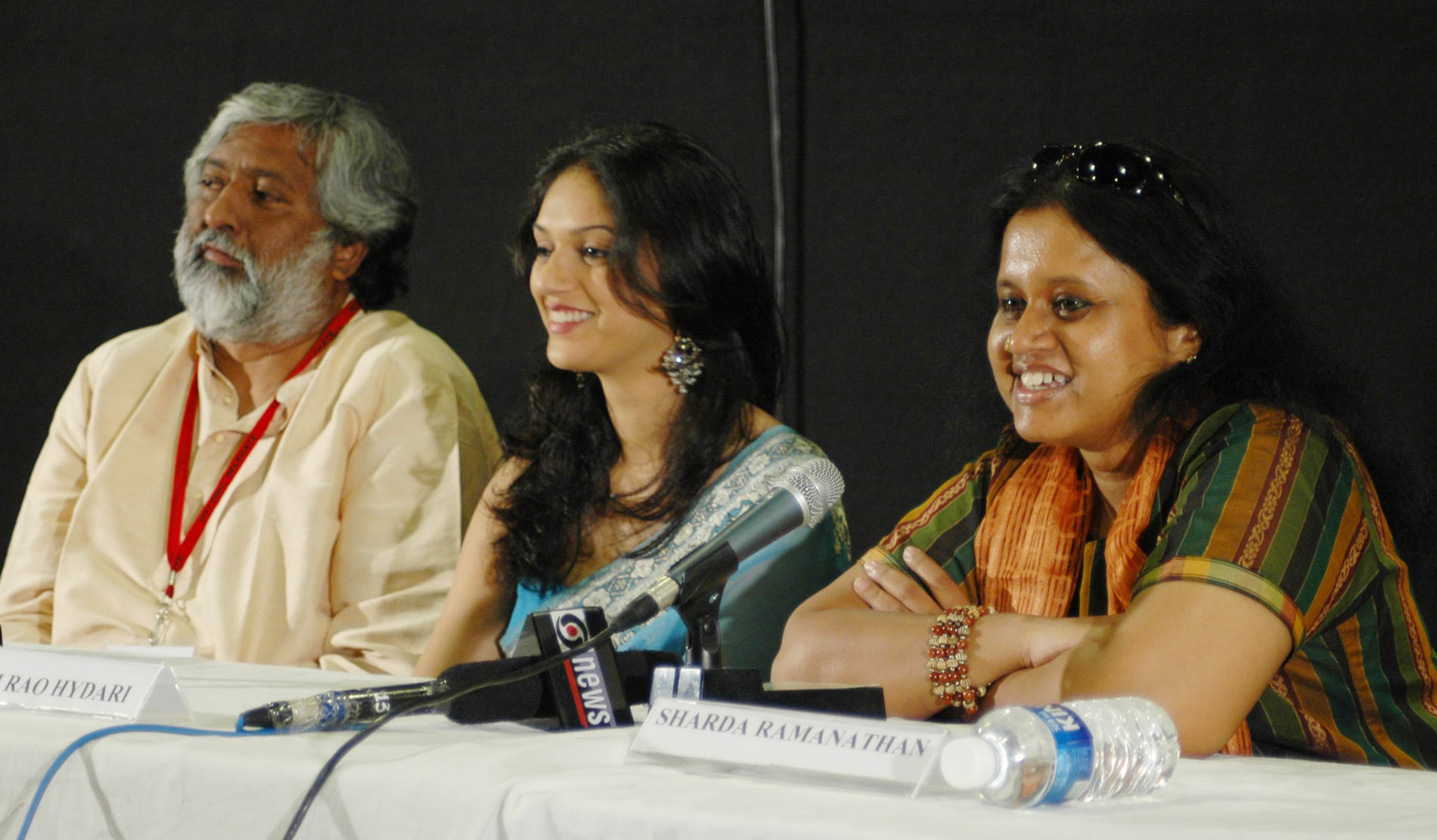
- Sharada Ramanathan (right), IFFI (2006)
- Born: India
- Occupations: Film director, cultural thinker, writer
- Awards: National Film Awards

Sharada Ramanathan is an Indian film director, cultural thinker and writer. She made her directional debut in the 2007 Tamil film Sringaram which won three National Film Awards. Her second film Puthiya Thiruppangal is awaiting release. In 2014, she directed Natyanubhava, a documentary film about Indian classical dance, featuring the top dancers and film technicians in India.

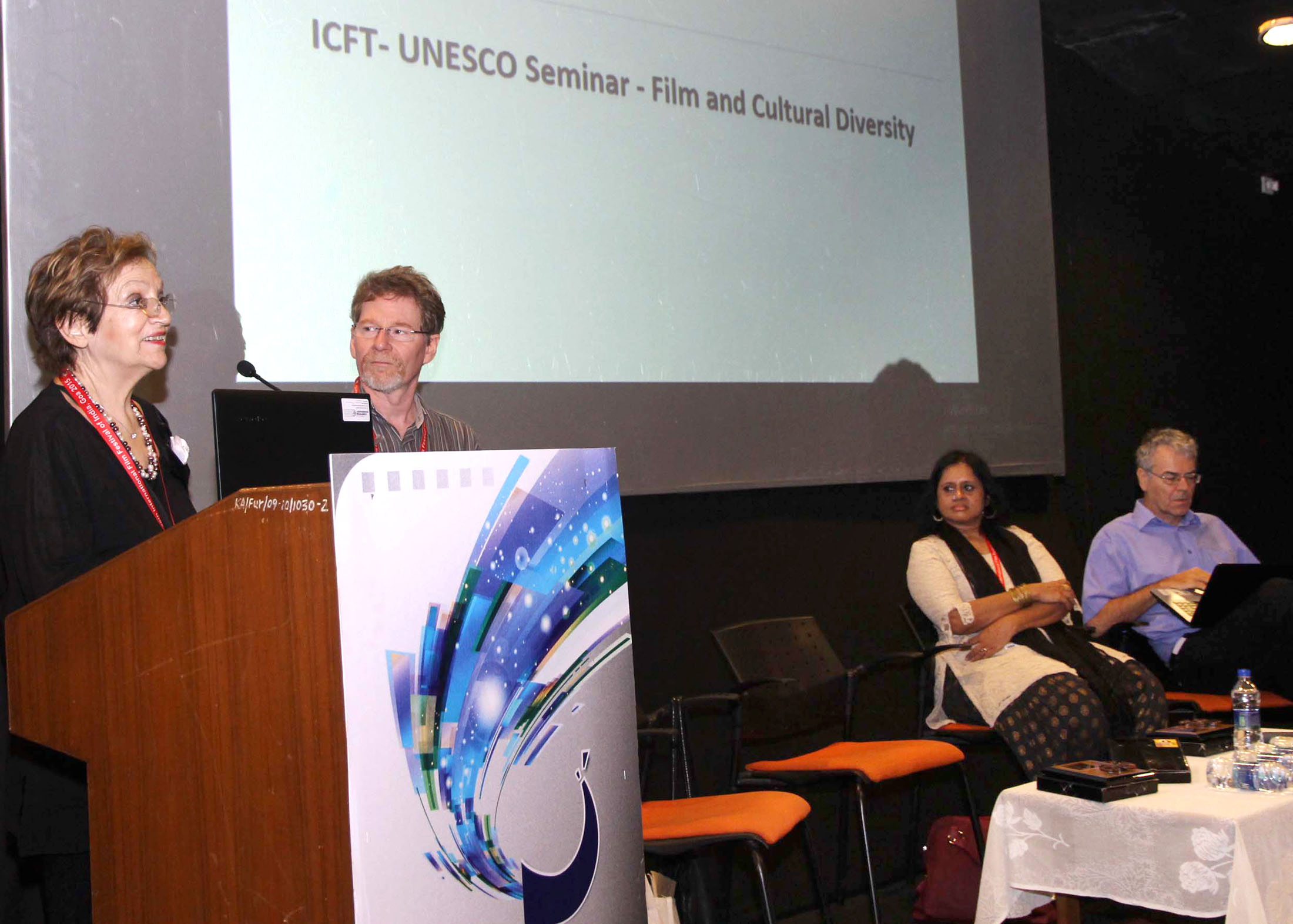
Sharada Ramanathan (second from right), IFFI (2015)

== Career ==
Prior to entering films, Sharada Ramanathan was working in the fields of media and culture. She was involved with social and cultural organizations SPIC MACAY and CRY. She was highly instrumental in setting up India Foundation for the Arts, a philanthropic organization to encourage fine arts in India. She was also associated with Ford Foundation as its "Program Officer".

Her first feature film, Sringaram (2007), is a period film and depicts the life of a Devadasi. After getting screened at various film festivals, the film had its theatrical release in 2007 and went on to win three National Film Awards and two Tamil Nadu State Film Awards. The film was critically acclaimed. Malathi Rangarajan of The Hindu noted, "Sringaram is an aesthetic showcase of first time maker Sharada Ramanathan's potential". She was one of the jury members of the 54th National Film Awards.

Her second film Puthiya Thiruppangal, which deals with child trafficking, is currently awaiting release. Unlike her previous film, Puthiya Thiruppangal takes place in modern-day and has been made on "commercial format". Sharada's third project Natyanubhava (2014) is a documentary focused on Indian classical dance. The film was produced by the Public Service Broadcasting Trust and funded by the Ministry of External Affairs. Sharada Directed a short film called Adivaanam (2020) that got popular and critical acclaim for its poetic class and won one international award. She worked with top class cast and crew like Aishwarya Rajesh Ashwin Kakumanu Ravi K. Chandran Santhosh Narayanan A. Sreekar Prasad. Sharada directed a short sequel, Vidivaanam with top artists and crew.

Sharada is Director of the Chennai-Based film company called Thaniththirai Productions.

== Other works ==
Apart from her film career, Sharada has also written for various dailies, journals and magazines. She is associated with United Nations Development Programme and UNESCO, and has served on many film-related international juries, including the Indian National Film Awards, IFFI Goa and International Macau Film Festival.

== Filmography ==
- Sringaram (2007)
- Natyanubhava (2015)

Short films

- Adivaanam - Horizon
- Vidivaanam - A New Dawn
