= Bahudari =

Janya raga of Carnatic music

Bahudhaari
- Arohanam: S G₃ M₁ P D₂ N₂ S
- Avarohanam: S N₂ P M₁ G₃ S

Bahudari (pronounced bahudhāri) is a rāgam in Carnatic music (musical scale of South Indian classical music). It is a derived scale (janya rāgam), as it does not have all the seven swaras (musical notes), derived from the 28th Melakarta raga Harikambhoji.

== Structure and Lakshana ==
Bahudari ascending scale with shadjam at C

Bahudari descending scale with shadjam at C

Bahudari is an asymmetric scale that does not contain rishabham. It is called a shadava-audava rāgam, in Carnatic music classification (as it has 6 notes in ascending and 5 notes in descending scale). Its ārohaṇa-avarohaṇa structure is as follows (see swaras in Carnatic music for details on below notation and terms):

- ārohaṇa : S G₃ M₁ P D₂ N₂ S (Note: Alternate notations: Hindustani: S G M P D Ṉ S; Western: C E F G A B♭ C)
- avarohaṇa : S N₂ P M₁ G₃ S (Note: Alternate notations: Hindustani: S Ṉ P M G S; Western: C B♭ G F E C)

This scale uses the notes shadjam, antara gandharam, shuddha madhyamam, panchamam, chathusruthi dhaivatham and kaisiki nishadam.

== Popular compositions ==
Bahudari is a melodious rāgam. Here are some popular compositions in Bahudari.

- Brova Bharama composed by Thyagaraja
- Marakoti sundari and Unnadiye gatiyendru by G. N. Balasubramaniam
- Sadananda tandavam seyyum by [(Achutadasar
- Bhaja Manasa vighneswaram composed by Thulaseevanam
- Sinamadaiyade Seerividade composed by Dandapani Desikar
- Sakala Shanti Karamu Sarvesha - tuned by Mahavidwan Sri Nedunuri Krishnamurty composed by Annamacharya
- Kamaladalayatha lochana by Dr M. Balamuralikrishna
- Mahâ Venkateshwarâ by Kalyani Varadarajan
- Irabeku Hari Dasara by Purandaradasa
- Indu sairisiri by Kanakadasa

== Film Songs ==
=== Language:Tamil ===
Song	Movie	Composer	Singer
Unnai Thedinen	Ival Oru Pournami	T. K. Ramamoorthy	S. Janaki
Vaa Vaa Aadiva	Jaathi Pookkal	Shyam	P. Jayachandran
Brova Bharama (Tyagaraja Kirti)	Kavari Maan	Ilaiyaraaja	K. J. Yesudas
Singalathu Chinnakuyile (Ragam Bhagyashree touches in Charanam)	Punnagai Mannan	Ilaiyaraaja	S. P. Balasubrahmanyam, K.S. Chitra
Thee Thee (Raga Tilang touches also)	Thiruda Thiruda	A. R. Rahman	Caroline, Noel James &A. R. Rahman
Hello Mr.Ethirkatchi	Iruvar	A. R. Rahman	Harini
Aaha Kaadhal Konji Pesudhe	Moondru Per Moondru Kadal	Yuvan Shankar Raja	Nandini Srikar
Lesa Parakkuthu	Vennila Kabadi Kuzhu	V. Selvaganesh	Karthik, Chinmayi
Un Vizhigalil	Maan Karate	Anirudh Ravichander	Anirudh Ravichander, Shruti Haasan
Unkoodave Porakkanum	Namma Veettu Pillai	D. Imman	Sid Sriram, Shashaa Tirupati
Aalangiliyae Aalangiliyae	Neruppu Da	Sean Roldan	Sean Roldan, Shweta Mohan
Poove Pooviname	144	Sean Roldan	Sean Roldan, Chinmayi
Siru Malligai	Vachathi	Jack Vathsan	Surmukhi Raman, Krishnaveni
Nee Uravaaga	Paambhu Sattai	Ajesh	Shreya Ghoshal, Haricharan
Maaman Magale	Kuttram Kuttrame	Ajesh	Benny Dayal, Pravin Saivi, Ajesh
