= Arikesavanallur =

- village
- Interactive map of Arikesavanallur
- Coordinates: 8.7107119°N 77.5098752°E
- Country: India
- State: Tamil Nadu

Languages
  - Official: Tamil
- Time zone: UTC+5:30 (IST)
- Nearest city: Tirunelveli

Arikesavanallur is a village in Ambasamuthiram Taluk, Tirunelveli district, Tamil Nadu, India. This village derives its name from the King Nindraseer Nedumaran who was also called as Harikesa.

This village is known for the Temple of Lord Shiva, Ariyanadaswamy Temple. This temple is more than 1100 years old.

== Notable people ==
- Muthiah Bhagavatar Carnatic music composer
- Harikesanallur Venkataraman, Astrologer
- Rasulmansur MOHAMMED, Automotive Expert
- T. L. Venkatarama Iyer, Carnatic music musicologist, Supreme Court Judge
