= Raghuvamsha Sudha =

Carnatic composition in praise of Rama

The Raghuvamsha Sudha (Sanskrit: रघुवंशसुधा, romanized: Raghuvaṃśasudhā) is a popular kriti (musical composition) in Carnatic music, composed by Patnam Subramania Iyer in the Sanskrit language. It is set in the raga (melody) kathanakuthuhalam and is written in the Adi tala (meter). It has been rendered by several musicians, including: Chembai, M. S. Subbulakshmi, Maharajapuram Santhanam, K. J. Yesudas; Neyyattinkara Vasudevan, Amrutha Venkatesh, Mandolin U. Srinivas, Shashank Subramanyam and E. Gayathri . It extols the Hindu deity Rama.

== Lyrics ==
raghuvaṃśa sudhāmbudhi candra
śrī rāma rājarājēśvara
aghamēgha māruta śrīkara
asurēśa mṛgēndra vara jagannātha
jamadagnija garva khaṇḍana
jayarudrādi vismita bhaṇḍana
kamalāptānvaya maṇḍana
agaṇitādbhuta śaurya śrī vēṅkaṭēśa

O moon to the nectar-ocean of the Raghu lineage!
O auspicious Rama, king of kings!
O wind that drives away sin! O doer of good!
O lion (who terrifies) the lord of the asuras!
O boon-granting lord of the world!O destroyer of Parashurama's pride!
O he who astonishes even Shiva!
O ornament of the lotus-loving dynasty!
O doer of wondrous deeds! O lord of Venkata!
