= Lalgudi Vijayalakshmi =

- Born: Lalgudi Vijayalakshmi; 1966 (age 59–60); Chennai
- Genres: Classical, fusion
- Occupations: Violinist, composer
- Instruments: Violin, vocal
- Years active: 1979 – present
- Website: Official site

Lalgudi Vijayalakshmi is a Carnatic violinist, vocalist and composer. She received the Sangita Kalanidhi award from the Madras Music Academy in 2022 along with her brother, G. J. R. Krishnan.

== Early life ==
Lalgudi Vijayalakshmi was born in Chennai to violin maestro Lalgudi Jayaraman. Her brother is also a noted violinist, G.J.R.Krishnan.

She began her training under the guidance of her grandfather Lalgudi Gopala Iyer, who belonged to the sishya parampara of Tyagaraja himself and later trained under her father.

== Career ==
Lalgudi Vijayalakshmi debuted in 1979. She travels extensively on musical tours all over the world. Her style like her father's gayaka style closest to vocal rendition.

She performs a lot of duets with her brother, a violin player.

== Discography ==
Albums that Lalgudi Vijayalakshmi has contributed to include:

With G. J. R. Krishnan:

- Twin Bows Of Lalgudi Tradition (1984)
- Violin (1993)
- G.J.R. Krishnan and Vijayalakshmi Violin (1997)
- Thillanas Of Lalgudi G. Jayaraman (2001)
- Bow to the Violins: South Indian Classical Music (2006)
- Tillanas (2009)
- Majesty In Melodies (Violin Duet) (2021)
- Violin - Lalgudi G. J. R. Krishnan & Lalgudi Vijayalakshmi (2021)
- Rama Bhakthi (2022)

With G. J. R. Krishnan and Mamadou Diabate:

- Strings Tradition (2008)

With S.P. Ramh and Lalitha Krishnan:

- Lalgudi Jayaraman's Jaya Jaya Devi (1997)

With Sikkil Mala Chandrasekar, Kallidaikuruchi S. Sivakumar, and N. Guruprasad:

- Vadhya Sunadha Pravaham (2009)

== Awards ==
- Kalaimamani Award - 2011
