= Thirunakkara Sree Mahadevar Temple =

Temple of Lord Shiva in Kerala, India

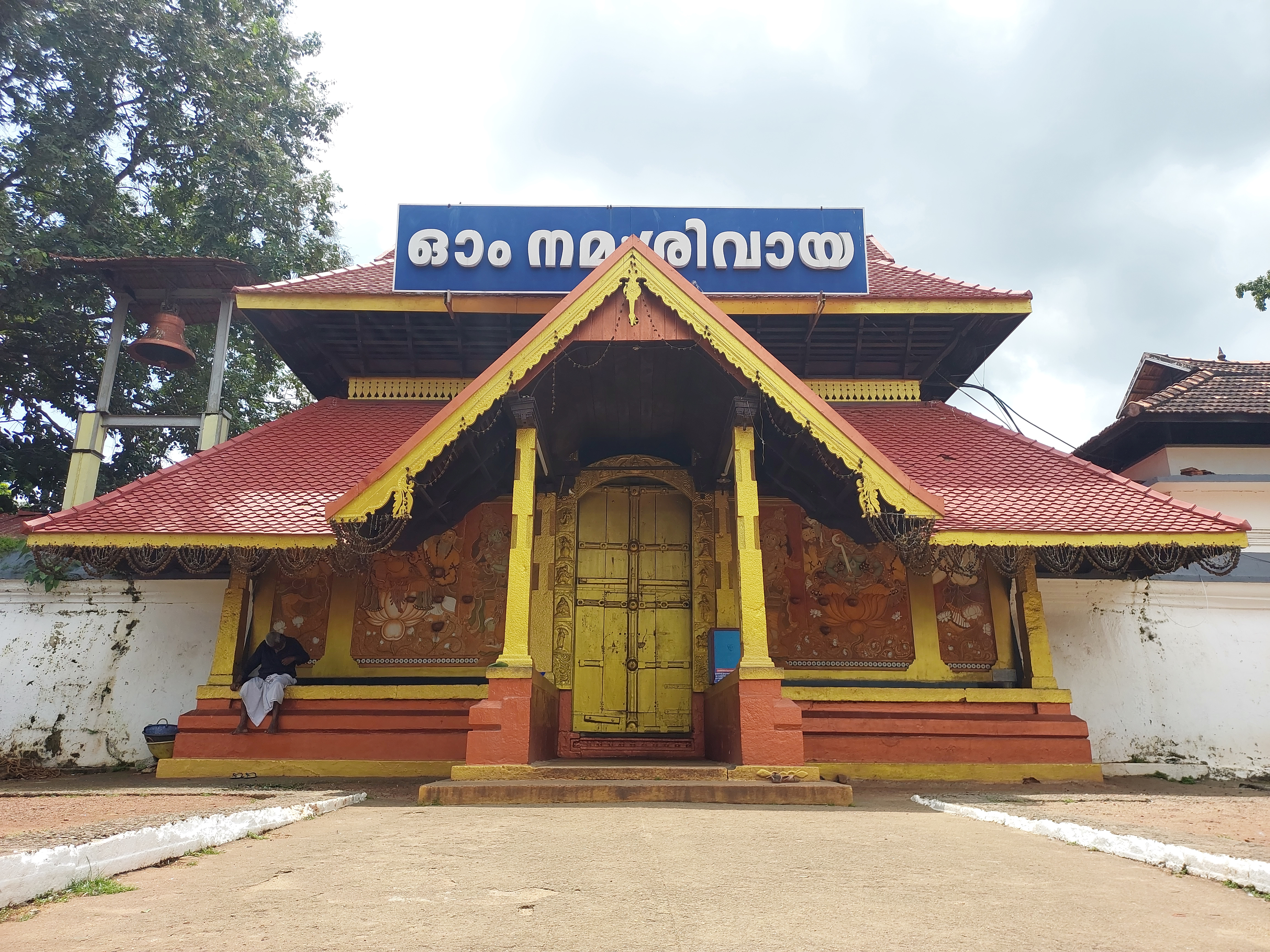
- Thirunakkara temple

- Mahadevar Temple, Thirunakkara, Kottayam, Kerala

Religion
- Affiliation: Hinduism
- District: Kottayam
- Deity: Thirunakkara thevar
- Festivals: Alpashi, Painguni and Aani
- Governing body: Travancore Devaswom Board

Location
- Location: Thirunakkara
- State: Kerala
- Country: India
- Coordinates: 9.590419°N 76.518806°E

Website
- thirunakkaratemple.org

Thirunakkara Mahadevar Temple is a Hindu place of worship in Kottayam, India, dedicated to Shiva. It is one of the 108 revered Shivalayas in Kerala. The temple is believed to have been built by a Maharaja of Thekkumkur circa the 16th century..The temple complex occupies about 4 acres (1.6 ha) of land.

== Festival ==
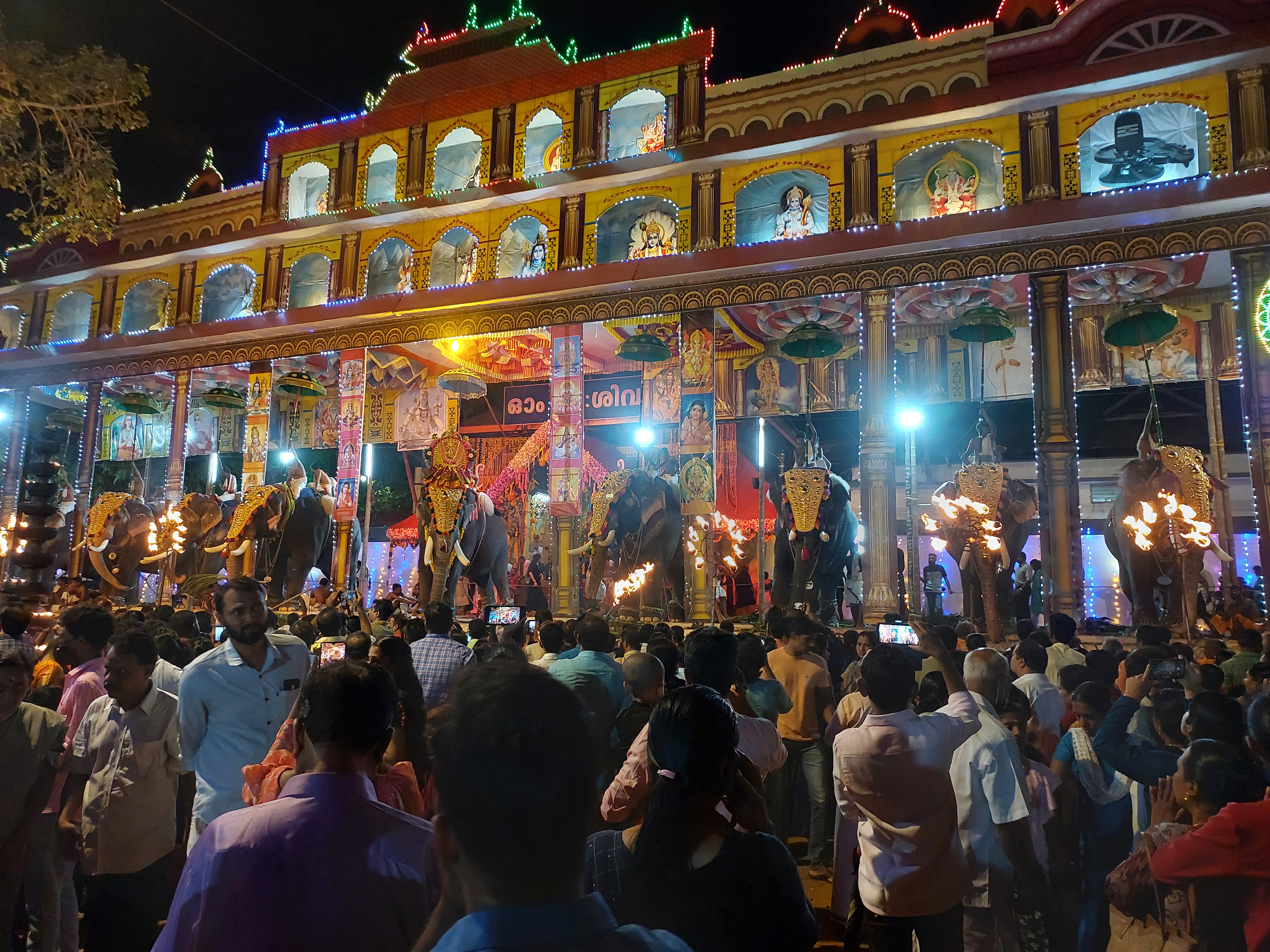
Festival in 2023

The temple hosts an annual ten-day festival ending with the aaraattu ritual of dipping an idol of a deity into a river or temple tank, which includes a procession of nine decorated elephants.
