= G. J. R. Krishnan =

Lalgudi G. J. R. Krishnan
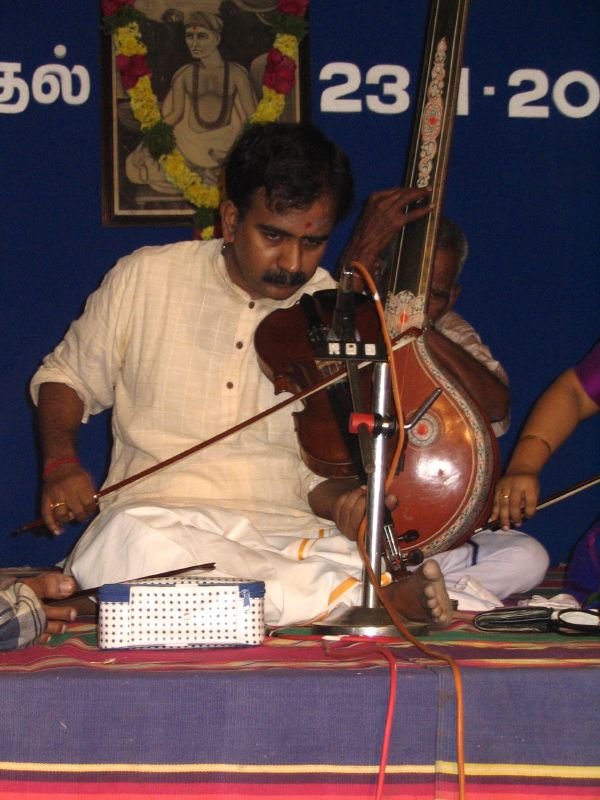
- Lalgudi G J R Krishnan performing in 2006

Background information
- Born: 15 April 1960 (age 66); Chennai, India
- Genres: Classical, fusion
- Occupations: Violinist, composer
- Instrument: Violin
- Years active: 1973 – present
- Website: http://www.lalgudigjrkrishnan.com/

Lalgudi Gopala Jayaraman Radhakrishnan, popularly known as G. J. R. Krishnan or Lalgudi Krishnan, is a Carnatic violinist, vocalist and composer. He is the son and disciple of the violinist Lalgudi G. Jayaraman. Over the years, Krishnan has nurtured and propagated the legacy of the Lalgudi Bani style, while also blending his own artistic elements. His style is defined by technique, bhava, laya, and a philosophical adherence to the notion that the violin must closely mimic the human voice. Lalgudi Krishnan was awarded with the Sangeet Natak Akademi Award in 2015. Along with his sister, Lalgudi Vijayalakshmi, the duo received the Sangita Kalanidhi award from the Madras Music Academy in 2022.

== Early life and background ==
Lalgudi Krishnan was born to violin maestro Lalgudi Jayaraman and Rajalakshmi.

Though a post graduate in commerce and a cost and works accountant and a company secretary education, Krishnan has dedicated his life to a career in music.

== Career ==
Lalgudi G. J. R. Krishnan debuted in 1973. His style, like his father's, is the gayaka style closest to vocal rendition.

G. J. R. Krishnan typically performs duets with his sister, Lalgudi Vijayalakshmi, a violin Vidushi.

G. J. R. Krishnan's world tours have included performances at: Lincoln Center, New York; a symphony, "Sunada Pravaham" (June 2004-conducted by G J R Krishnan) at the Singapore Arts Festival; Tropical Institute of Amsterdam; Concertgebouw-Amsterdam for the Indo Amsterdam Festival; Smithsonian Institution-Washington, USA; India Festival in the former USSR; Purcell Room, London.

== Awards ==
Awards G. J. R. Krishnan has won include:

- 1986 – Best Violinist Award from the Music Academy, Chennai
- 1998 – Sangeetha Choodamani award conferred by Sri Krishna Gana Sabha, Chennai,
- 1998 – Kalki Krishnamurthy Memorial Award, the Kalki Krishnamurthy Centenary year from the Kalki Krishnamurthy Memorial Trust
- 2006 – Kalaimamani from the Tamil Nadu Iyal Isai Nataka Mandram, Government of Tamil Nadu
- 2009 – Sangeetha Kalasagara Award from Kalasagaram (conferred at the 42nd Annual Cultural Festival of Music, Dance & Drama)
- 2015 – Sangeet Natak Academi Award
- 2017- 8th Indira Sivasailam Endowment Medal from the Indira Sivasailam Foundation and the Music Academy, Chennai
- 2022- Sangita Kalanidhi from the Madras Music Academy, along with his sister, Lalgudi Vijayalakshmi.

== Discography ==
Albums that G. J. R. Krishnan has contributed to include:

With Lalgudi Vijayalakshmi:

- Twin Bows Of Lalgudi Tradition (1984)
- Violin (1993)
- G.J.R. Krishnan and Vijayalakshmi Violin (1997)
- Thillanas Of Lalgudi G. Jayaraman (2001)
- Bow to the Violins: South Indian Classical Music (2006)
- Tillanas (2009)
- Majesty In Melodies (Violin Duet) (2021)
- Violin - Lalgudi G. J. R. Krishnan & Lalgudi Vijayalakshmi (2021)
- Rama Bhakthi (2022)

With Lalgudi Vijayalakshmi and Mamadou Diabate:

- Strings Tradition (2008)

With Anil Srinivasan:

- Eternal Light (2009)
