= Devagandhari =

Janya raga of Carnatic music

- Arohanam: S R₂ M₁ P D₂ Ṡ
- Avarohanam: Ṡ N₃ D₂ N₂ D₂ P M₁ G₃ R₂ S

Devagandhari (pronounced devagāndhāri) is a raga (musical scale) in Indian classical music. In carnatic classical music, Devagandhari is a janya raga (derived scale), whose melakarta raga (parent scale, also known as janaka) is Shankarabharanam, 29th in the 72 Melakarta raga system. This is not to be confused with Karnataka Devagandhari, which is a janya of Kharaharapriya similar to Abheri.

It is also present in the Sikh tradition of northern India and is part of the Guru Granth Sahib.

== Structure and lakshana ==
Ascending scale with Shadjam at C

Descending scale with Shadjam at C

Its ārohaṇa-avarohaṇa structure (ascending and descending scale) is as follows (see swaras in Carnatic music for details on below notation and terms):

- ārohaṇa : S R₂ M₁ P D₂ Ṡ (Note: Alternate notations: Hindustani: S R M P D Ṡ; Western: C D F G A C)
- avarohaṇa : Ṡ N₃ D₂ N₂ D₂ P M₁ G₃ R₂ S (Note: Alternate notations: Hindustani: Ṡ N D Ṉ D P M G R S; Western: C B A B♭ A G F E D C)

Devagandhari ragam is an audava-vakra-sampurna raga meaning, in arohana 5 swaras come (so it is called audava) and in avarohana all swaras come (so sampurna), and there is a "zigzag" pattern of notes (so vakra). The notes used in this ragam are shadjam, chatushruti rishabham, antara gandharam, shuddha madhyamam, panchamam, chatushruti dhaivatam and kakili nishadam. This ragam sometimes includes the kaishika nishadam (anya swara – a note external to the scale, making this a bhashanga ragam).

The closest raga to this one is Arabhi. Some of the things that makes Arabhi different (though both share the same ascending and descending scale, in terms of basic notation) are:

- Devagandhari is sung with gamakas and vilambita kala prayogas (usages with elongated notes)
- Devagandhari is sung with deergha gandharam (elongated G3)
- Devagandhari is a bhashanga raga, and certain prayogas use the kaishika nishadam: S N3 D N2, D P

=== See also ===
- Kirtan
- Raga
- Taal
