= Kidangoor Subramanya Swami Temple =

- കിടങ്ങൂർ ശ്രീസുബ്രഹ്മണ്യ സ്വാമി ക്ഷേത്രം

- Subramanya Swamy Temple, Kidangoor, Kottayam, Kerala

Religion
- Affiliation: Hinduism
- District: Kottayam
- Deity: Kartikeya as Thrikkidangoorappan
- Festival: Thaipooyam
- Governing body: Kidangoor Ooranma Devaswom

Location
- Location: Kidangoor
- State: Kerala
- Country: India
- Interactive map of Kidangoor Subramanya Swami Temple
- Coordinates: 9°40′31.9″N 76°36′40.0″E

Architecture
- Type: Traditional Kerala style

Specifications
- Temple: One
- Elevation: 34.17 m (112 ft)

Kidangoor Subramanya Swami Temple is an ancient Hindu temple located in Kidangoor near Ayarkkunnam in Kottayam district in the Indian state of Kerala. It is one of the renowned Subramanya temples in Kerala which is estimated to be at least 1500 years old.

== Location ==
The temple is located on Manarcaud - Kidangoor state highway, near the banks of Meenachil river. It is about 2 km from Kidangoor and 5 km from Ayarkunnam.

== Legend ==
Kidangoor is one among the 64 Nambudiri villages and was on the boundary of the Vadakkumkur and Thekkumkur kingdoms. The legend has it that the idol of Subramanya came out of the Kamandalu (an oblong pot) of sage Gauna when the water flowed out. The idol flowed along with the water and it reached the Vishnu shrine in Kidangoor.

== Other temple deities ==
- Bhagavathi: (Bhuvaneshvari) faces south.
- Sastha: Sastha shrine is placed in the southwest corner.
- Vishnu: Vishnu has equal importance in the temple. He presides here by the name 'Vadakkumthevar' and the shrine is placed to the north of Subramanya sanctum. It is believed to be older than the Subramanya temple.
- Ganapathi: Ganesha is installed in a separate temple on the south-west side of the temple, facing east. This temple is a sub-temple of Kidangoor Temple, though constructed very recently in 1995.

== Festivals ==
The temple hosts its annual festival in the Malayalam month of Kumbham (i.e. February/March) which lasts 10 long days. As in many temples in Kerala, the festivities start-off with the ceremonial flag hosting (Kodiyettu) on the Karthika day. The Aarattu (holy bathing) is held at Chembilavu Ponkunnathu Mahadeva temple on the banks of Meenachil river. Lord Shiva who presides at this temple is considered as the father of Thrikkidangoorappan. 'Thaipooyam' in the month of Makaram and 'Skanda Shashti' are the other important festive occasions. Pilgrims from different regions comes here to perform the sacred Shashtivrata on the 6th day of Amavasya.

== Gallery ==
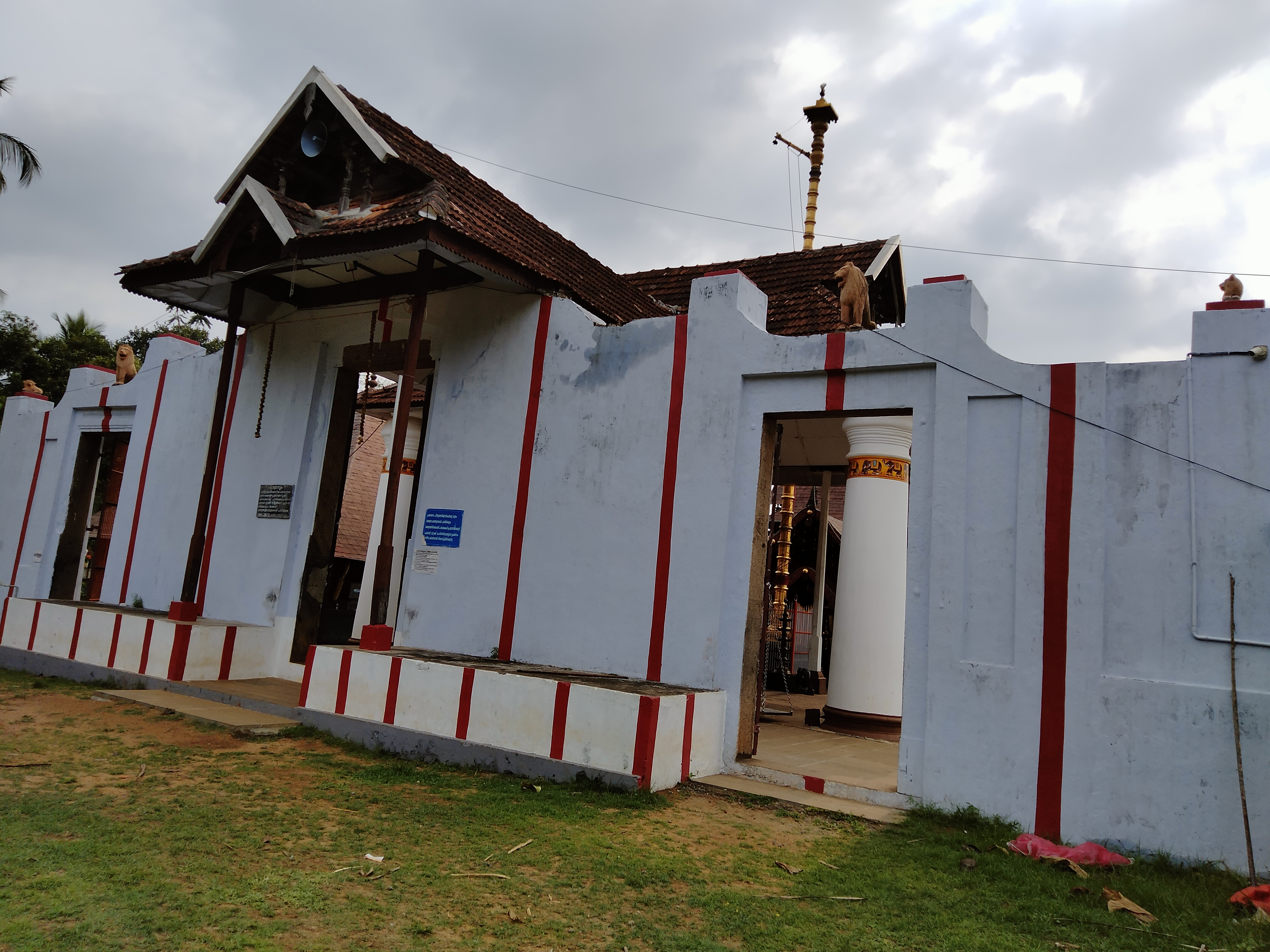
Kidangoor Subramanya Temple

Kidangoor Subramanya Temple anappanthal

Kidangoor Subramanya Temple art work

Kidangoor Subramanya Temple bhalikkallu

Kidangoor Subramanya Temple front side flag post

Kidangoor Subramanya Temple koothambalam

Kidangoor Subramanya Temple pillar made of Sida plant

Kidangoor Subramanya Temple side view
