= Muthiah Bhagavatar =

Indian composer (1877–1945)

- Born: Harikesanallur Muthiah Bhagavatar; 15 November 1877; Harikesanallur, Tinnevely District, Madras Presidency, British India (Present-day Tirunelveli District, Tamil Nadu, India)
- Died: 30 June 1945 (aged 67); Mysore, Kingdom of Mysore, British India (now Mysuru, Karnataka, India)
- Occupation: Song composer

Harikesanallur Muthiah Bhagavatar (15 November 1877 – 30 June 1945), commonly known as Muthiah Bhagavatar, is one of Carnatic classical music's famous twentieth-century composers. He also created about 20 ragas.

== Early life ==
Muthiah was born on 15 November 1877 into an affluent Tamil Brahmin family in Arikesavanallur, a village near Ambasamudram in present-day Tirunelveli district, Tamil Nadu, India, . He was exposed to music from a very early age, as his father was a patron of musicians. He lost his father at the young age of six years, when his maternal uncle M. Lakshmana Suri took over the responsibility for his education, initiating Muthiah into Sanskrit and Vedic studies. However, the love of music that had been implanted in him led Muthiah to leave his hometown of Harikesanallur, Tamil Nadu when he was only ten years in search of a teacher. He found the gifted teacher Padinaindumandapa Sambasiva Iyer at Tiruvarur, who recognised Muthiah's talent for music. Sambasiva Iyer was the father of T.S Sabesa Iyer, a contemporary who also went on to win the prestigious Sangeetha Kalanidhi award from the Madras Music Academy in 1934. During the nine years he spent with Sambasiva Iyer, Muthiah cultivated this talent and made his name as a Harikata Vidhwan. His rich voice and excellent tanam singing made him one of the era's most highly coveted concert artists. He was Asthana vidvan in seithur zamin and first guru of M S Subbulakshmi. His cousin Venkatarama Iyer was a Supreme Court Judge as well as recipient of Sangeet Kalanidhi award in 1944.

== Composer ==
He has to his credit almost 400 musical compositions, the largest among the post-Trinity composers, that included many different types of Varnams as well as Kritis and Thillanas. The songs were on a number of the Hindu pantheon, his patrons. He composed them in four languages – Telugu, Tamil, Sanskrit and Kannada.

Some of the ragams that owe their existence today to this great composer include Vijaysaraswathi, Karnaranjani, Budhamanohari and Niroshta. He also popularised Shanmukhapriya and Mohanakalyani. When someone asked if he could compose something that would appeal to Westerners, he composed the English notes (later popularised by Madurai Mani Iyer).

In 1934, Muthiah composed music for Tamil Nadu Talkies then owned by S. Soundararaja for their Lavakusa, a film based on the Uttara Ramayana. Bhagavathar initially was very reluctant but was later persuaded by Raval Krishna Iyer, a budding contractor of Madras. Muthiah travelled to Bombay where the film was being made at the Ranjit Studios. He composed 63 songs for the film resulting in the film being renamed as Sangeetha Lavakusa.

== Artist ==
He was adept at playing both the Chitraveena and Mridangam.

In addition to musical talents, his theoretical knowledge was also vast. He wrote a treatise on musical theory, Sangita Kalpa Drumam, and regularly gave lectures on musicology at the Music Academy. He was the first musician to be awarded a doctorate in India when the Kerala University awarded him the D. Litt. for his Tamil treatise in 1943. He was also the first principal of the Swati Tirunal Academy of music started in Trivandrum in 1939. Muthiah Bhagavatar has also authored a Sanskrit poetic work called Tyagaraja Vijaya Kavya. T. N. Seshagopalan, who was taught by Ramanathapuram Sankara Sivam, a disciple of Muthiah Bhagavathar, said "He was also the first to introduce the practice of nagaswara vidwans playing during the puja time at the Thiruvananthapuram temple."

He lived like a great king, but was as magnanimous as he was rich. The Harikesanjali Trust (promoted by his descendants) has been established to propagate his compositions.

== Awards and recognitions ==
Having impressed the Maharaja of Mysore, he was appointed court musician at Mysore. He was patronized by the Maharaja of Mysore Krishna Raja Wadiyar IV. At Mysore he composed 115 kritis in Kannada in praise of Goddess Chamundeshwari, the patron goddess of the Wodeyar dynasty. Later he was invited to the court of Travancore by the Maharaja Mulam Tirunal where he studied Swatitirunal kritis and wrote the book Sangeeta Kalpadruma, which won him an honorary doctorate. Muthiah Bhagavathar was the first President of the Annual Conference at the Madras Music Academy and was awarded the most prestigious award in Carnatic music, Sangeetha Kalanidhi title in 1930. He was conferred with an honorary doctorate by University of Kerala in 1942.

== Legacy ==
When he died in Mysore on 30 June 1945, Muthiah Bhagavatar had written over 400 kritis and changed the entire landscape of Carnatic music by introducing many Hindustani ragas (for example "Sohini" which is Hamsaanandhi in carnatic and Saarang Malhar) and creating approximately 20 new ragas of his own. He ensured that his legacy would live on with such compositions as Bhuvanesvariya and also through his disciples, the most famous of which was Madurai Mani Iyer.

Muthiah Bhagavatar's legacy of music lives on in his granddaughter, veena expert Smt. Rugmini Gopalakrishnan.

== Compositions ==
=== Tamil compositions ===
Annai Makali, Raagam : Kapi, Adi tALaM

Andavan Darishname Raagam : Jonpuri, Adi tALaM

Unnai ninaindu Raagam : Ragamalika, Adi tALaM

=== Varnams ===
Composition	Raga	Tala	Language	Type
mAtE malaya-dhvaja pANDya-saHNjAtE	Khamas	Adi	Kannada	Dharu Varnam
shrI rAja-mAtaHNgi	Shuddha Dhanyasi	Adi	Telugu	Tana Varnam
shrI rAjarAjEswari	Kapi	Misra Chapu	Sanskrit	Dharu Varnam
Balumosa Mayyanura	Sahana	Khanda Chapu	Telugu	Dharu Varnam
Sannuthangi shri Chamundeshwari	Vasantha	Adi	Kannada	Dharu Varnam
manamOhana	Mohanam	Ata	Telugu	Tana varnam

=== Other Krithis ===
Composition	Raga	Tala	Language	Audio Links
Valli nAyaka	Shanmukhapriya	Adi tALaM	Telugu	
Annai Makali	Kapi	Adi tALaM	Tamil	
Andavan Darishname	Jonpuri	Adi tALaM	Tamil	
Ananda rUpaM haraM durdarshaM	vijayashrI	Adi	Sanskrit	
ambA vANi nannu AdarimpavE	Keeravani	Adi	Telugu	T N Seshagopalan on YouTube
aSTAdasha-supIThasthE	simhEndra madhyamam	rUpaka	Sanskrit	
dakSAdhvara-haraM shaHNkaraM	Surati			
bhuvanEshwariya	mOhana kalyANi	Adi	Kannada	Maharajapuram Santhanam on YouTube
gam gaNapatE namO namaH	hamsadhwani	rUpaka	Sanskrit	Nithyasree Mahadevan on YouTube
himagiri-tanayE hEma-latE	Shuddha Dhanyasi	Adi	Sanskrit	S. Sowmya on YouTube
rAja-rAjArAdhitE	Niroshta	rupakam	Sanskrit	
shakti-gaNapatiM bhajEhaM	nATa	rUpaka	Sanskrit	
charaNam vijayasaraswati mAyE	vijayasaraswati	Adi	Sanskrit	
AryA dEvi amarEsha-nutE	sahAnA	Adi	Sanskrit	
siddhi-vinAyakaM sEvEhaM	mOhana kalyANi	Adi	Sanskrit	
sudhA-mayI sudhA-nidhE	amRta varSiNi	rUpaka	Sanskrit	
vijayAmbikE vimalAtmikE	vijaya nAgari	Adi	Sanskrit	
ratna-kaHNcuka-dhAriNi	Kambhoji	Misra ChApu	Sanskrit	
AdityaM dEvAdhi-dEvaM	mAyAmALavagauLaM	Adi tALaM	Sanskrit	
Unnai ninaindu	Ragamalika	Adi tALaM	Tamil	
Sri saravaNa bhavunivina	Sumanapriya	rUpaka	Sanskrit	
giripriyaM gangAdharaM	Katanakutuhalam	Adi	Sanskrit	
devI SrI mahAlakshmi	Harinarayani	Rupakam	Kannada	
jaya mangaLaM nitya Subha mangaLaM	Vasanta	Adi	Kannada	
umE ninnagE	Sri	Adi	Kannada	
vAgIshvari vani saraswathi	saraswathi	Adi/Deshaadi	Sanskrit	
vAncatOnunA	Karnaranjani	Rupakam	Telugu	
varasiddhi vinAyaka	Kannada	Adi	Sanskrit	
jaya mahishasura mardini	Hamsadhwani	Rupakam	Sanskrit	R. K Srikanthan on YouTube
Bhairavi Parameshwari	Bhairavi	Rupaka	Sanskrit	
jAlandharA supeethasthE	Valaji	Rupakam	Sanskrit	

== See also ==
- List of Carnatic composers
