= Pazhavangadi Ganapathy Temple =

Hindu Temple

- ശ്രീ പഴവങ്ങാടി മഹാ ഗണപതി ക്ഷേത്രം
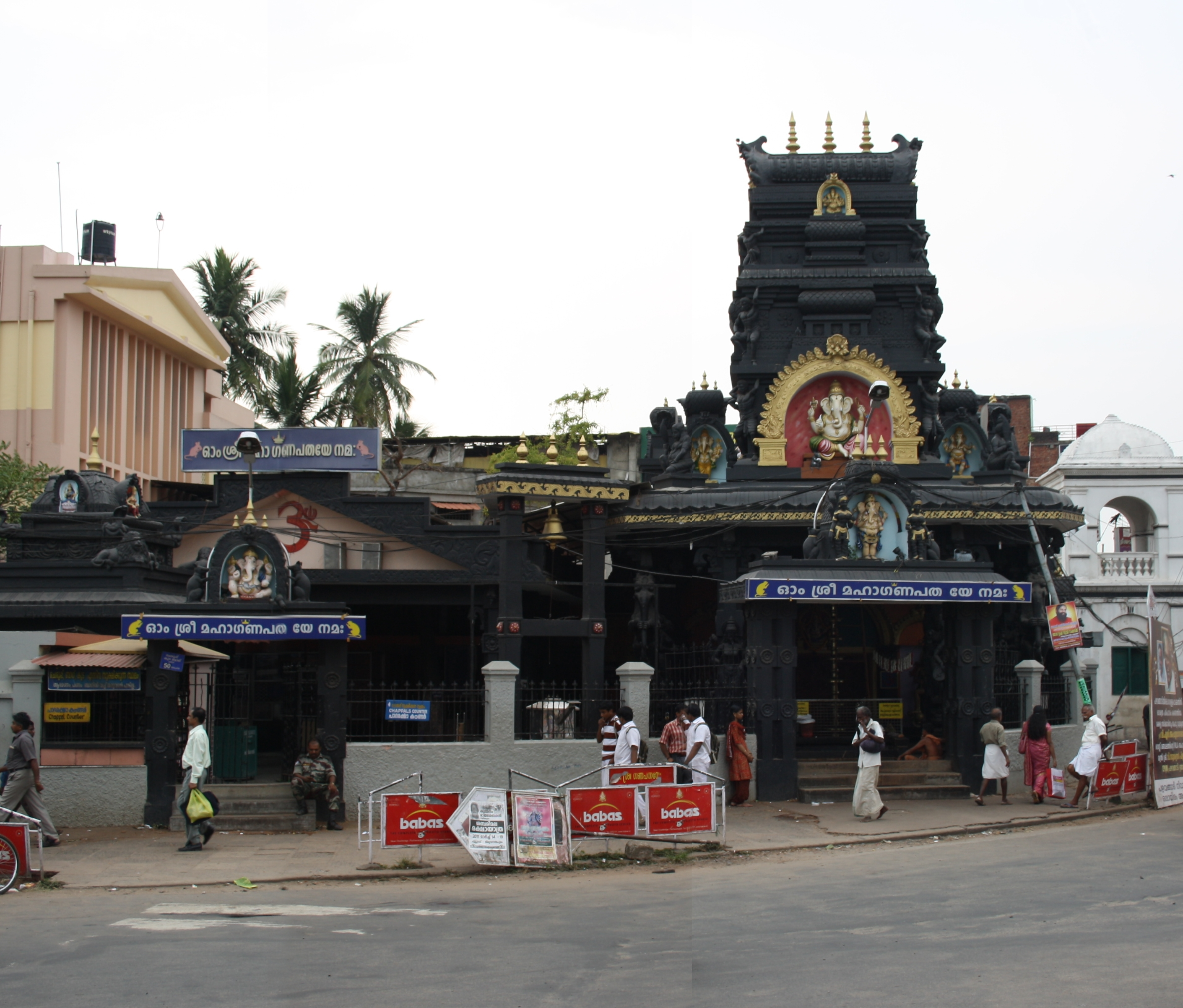
- Pazhavangadi Ganapathy Temple

- Pazhavangadi Ganapathy Temple, East Fort, Thiruvananthapuram, Kerala

Religion
- Affiliation: Hinduism
- District: Thiruvananthapuram
- Deity: Mahaganapathy Ganesha

Location
- Location: East Fort
- State: Kerala
- Country: India
- Interactive map of Pazhavangadi Ganapathy Temple
- Coordinates: 8°29′04.6″N 76°56′50.3″E

Specifications
- Direction of façade: East Facing Seated posture with right leg folded
- Temple: One
- Elevation: 26.14 m (86 ft)

The Pazhavangadi Maha Ganapathy temple (Malayalam: ശ്രീ പഴവങ്ങാടി മഹാ ഗണപതി ക്ഷേത്രം) is situated at East Fort in the heart of Thiruvananthapuram City, Kerala, India. The main Deity of the temple is Sri Mahaganapathy (Ganesha). The main idol is installed in a seated posture with the right leg in a folded stance. The temple is situated in close proximity to the Sri Padmanabhaswamy temple. Other Deities worshiped at the temple include Dharmasasta, Goddess Durga and Nagaraja. The temple sculptures include 32 different forms of Lord Ganesha.

== History ==
The original Idol was maintained by The Nair Brigade initially at Padmanabhapuram and later when they were shifted to Thiruvananthapuram they installed the Idol and the current temple came into being. After the integration of the Travancore army with the Indian Forces, the temple is being maintained by the Indian Army.

== Offerings ==
The main Vazhipadu (Offering) is the breaking of coconuts at the temple. Other offerings associated with Lord Ganesha like Ganapathy Homam, Appam, Modakam etc. are also performed here.

== Major Festivals ==
Some of the major festivals celebrated at the temple are Vinayaka Chathurthi (Ganesh Jayanthi), Virad Chathurthi and Sankashti Chathurthi. Special Poojas are also performed on the occasion of Thiruvonam, Deepavali, Vijayadashami, Vishu, etc.

== Temple dress code ==
As with many prominent temples in Kerala, in order to enter the main temple complex of the temple men need to be wearing a mundu and no upper body clothing. Women are required to wear traditional attire like a sari.

== How to get there ==
The temple is located 0.5 km from the Thiruvananthapuram Central railway station and the central bus station. The nearest city bus stand is at East Fort.

Thiruvananthapuram International Airport is about 8 kilometers away from the temple.
