= Poornachandrika =

Janya raga of Carnatic music

- Arohanam: S R₂ G₃ M₁ P D₂ P Ṡ
- Avarohanam: Ṡ N₃ P M₁ R₂ G₃ M₁ R₂ S

Poornachandrika is a raga in Carnatic music, classical music of South India. It is a janya raga of Shankarabharanam, 29th in the 72 Melakarta ragas.

== Structure and Lakshana ==
Its arohana-avarohana structure is as follows:

Arohana: S R₂ G₃ M₁ P D₂ P Ṡ (Note: Alternate notations: Hindustani: S R G M P D P Ṡ; Western: C D E F G A G C)

Avarohana: Ṡ N₃ P M₁ R₂ G₃ M₁ R₂ S (Note: Alternate notations: Hindustani: Ṡ N P M R G M R S; Western: C B G F D E F D C)
