= Sankarabharanam (raga) =

Rāga in Carnatic music (with melekarta rāga system)

Shankarabharanam
- Mela: 29th, Dheera Shankarabharanam
- Chakra: Bāṇa
- Arohanam: S R₂ G₃ M₁ P D₂ N₃ Ṡ
- Avarohanam: Ṡ N₃ D₂ P M₁ G₃ R₂ S
- Synonym: Dheera Shankaraabharanam
- Equivalent: Bilaval thaat; Ionian mode

Dhīraśankarābharaṇaṃ, commonly known as Śankarābharaṇaṃ, is a rāga in Carnatic music. It is the 29th Melakarta rāga in the 72 Melakarta rāga system of Carnatic music. Since this raga has many Gamakās (ornamentations), it is glorified as "Sarva Gamaka Māṇika Rakti Rāgaṃ".

By scale wise, the Śankarābharaṇaṃ scale corresponds to Bilaval in the Hindustani music system. The Western equivalent is the major scale, or the Ionian mode. Hence this rāga is one of the most popular scales across the world, known with different names in different musical styles.

The nature of the raga is to seem mellifluous and smooth. It is ideal for a presentation that appears melodious, but also not serious.

== Structure and Lakshana ==
Śaṃkarābharaṇaṃ scale with shadjam at C

It is the 5th Rāga in the 5th Chakra Bāṇa. The mnemonic name is Bāṇa-Ma. The mnemonic phrase is sa ri ga ma pa da ni sa Its ārohaṇa-avarōhaṇa structure is as follows (see swaras in Carnatic music for details on below notation and terms):

- ārōhaṇa: S R₂ G₃ M₁ P D₂ N₃ Ṡ (Note: Alternate notations: Hindustani: S R G M P D N Ṡ; Western: C D E F G A B C)
- avarōhaṇa: Ṡ N₃ D₂ P M₁ G₃ R₂ S (Note: Alternate notations: Hindustani: Ṡ N D P M G R S; Western: C B A G F E D C)

The notes in this scale are shadjam, chatushruti rishabham, antara gandharam, shuddha madhyamam, paṅchamam, chatushruti dhaivatam and Kakali Nishadam. As it is a Melakarta rāga, by definition it is a Sampurṇa rāga (has all seven notes in ascending and descending scale). It is the Shuddha Madhyamam equivalent of 65th Melakarta rāga Kaḷyāṇi.

== Janya Rāgas ==
Due to the even spacing of Svaras(notes), many Janya Ragas can be derived from Śaņkarābharaṇaṃ. It is one of the Melakarta Ragas that has high number of Janya Ragas (derived scales) associated with it.

Many of the Janya Ragas are very popular on their own, lending themselves to elaboration, interpretation and evoking different moods. Notable examples are the ragas Arabhi, Atana, Bilahari, Begada, Maand, Devagaandhaari, Jana Ranjani, Hamsadhvani, Kathanakuthuhalam, Niroshta, Shuddha Sāveri, Pahādi, Poornachandrika, Kedaram, Kurinji, Navroj, Sarasvati-manohari, Naagadhvani, and Garudadhvani.

== Compositions ==
Below is an incomplete list of composition in the Raga Śankarābharaṇaṃ:

=== Varnams ===
- Chalamela and Indumukhi, khanda ata tala varnams by Maharaja Swathi Thirunal in Telugu.
- Sami Ninne, an adi tala varnam by Veena Kuppayyar.
- Manavi Chekonarada, an aditala varnam by Ponniah Pillai of the Tanjore Quartet.
- Niluparani Mohamuto, in ata tala, by Patnam Subramania Iyer.
- Sakhiye Intha Jalam, in adi tala, by K. N. Dandayudhapani Pillai.
- Samikki Sari Evvare, in adi tala by Kunrakudi Venkatarama Iyer.
- Entha Sudhiname, in adi tala by Dr. M. Balamuralikrishna.

=== Kritis/Keertanas ===
- Dakṣhiṇāmūrtē, Nāgalingam Bhajēham, Sadāśivam Upāsmahē, Śrī Venugopālam Bhaja, Tārakeshvara Dayānidhē, Girijayā Ajayā Abhayāmbikayā, Akṣhayalinga Vibho, Brihadīshvarāya Namastē, Pavanātmajam, Sundareshvarāya, and Śrī Kamalāmbikāyā Katākshithoham by Muthuswami Dikshitar.
- Parāshakthi Parākela and Shankarāchāryam by Subbarama Dikshitar.
- Eduṭa Nilacitē, Bhakti Bhikṣamīyavē, Maryāda Kādurā, Rāmā Ninnuvinā by Tyagaraja.
