= Hamsadhvani =

Janya raga of Carnatic music

Hamsadhwani
- Thaat: Bilaval
- Type: Audava
- Time of day: Early night, 9–12
- Arohana: S R G P N Ṡ
- Avarohana: Ṡ N P G R S
- Pakad: G P N - Ṡ N P G
- Vadi: R
- Samavadi: P
- Similar: Shankara

Hamsadhvani (meaning "the cry of the swan"), is a rāga in Carnatic music (musical scale of Carnatic tradition of Indian classical music). It is an audava rāgam (or owdava rāga, meaning pentatonic scale). It is a janya rāga of the Melakartha raga, Sankarabharanam (29th) but according to Hamsadhvani's prayoga or the way it is sung it is said to be the janya of Kalyani (65th).

Hamsadhvani is also extensively used in Hindustani music and is borrowed into it from Carnatic music. It was created by the Carnatic composer Ramaswami Dikshitar (1735–1817), father of Muthuswami Dikshitar (one of the musical trinity of Carnatic music), and brought into Hindustani music by Aman Ali Khan of the Bhendibazaar gharana. It has become popular due to Amir Khan.

== Structure and lakshana ==
Hamsadhvani scale with shadjam (tonic) at C

Hamsadhvani does not contain madhyamam or dhaivatham. It is a pentatonic scale (audava-audava ragam in Carnatic music classification – audava meaning 'of 5'). Its ārohaṇa-avarohaṇa structure (ascending and descending scale) is as follows (see swaras in Carnatic music for details on below notation and terms):

- ārohaṇa : S R₂ G₃ P N₃ Ṡ (Note: Alternate notations: Hindustani: S R G P N Ṡ; Western: C D E G B C)
- avarohaṇa :Ṡ N₃ P G₃ R₂ S (Note: Alternate notations: Hindustani: Ṡ N P G R S; Western: C B G E D C)

Hamsadhwani

The notes used in this scale are shadjam, chatushruti rishabham, antara gandharam, panchamam and kakali nishadam. In Hindustani music, it is associated with Bilaval thaat (equivalent of Shankarabharanam).

== Compositions ==
Hamsadhvani rāgam lends itself for elaboration and exploration and has many compositions in both classical music and film music. It is usually sung at the beginning of a performance.

== Literature ==
- Bor, Joep (ed). Rao, Suvarnalata; der Meer, Wim van; Harvey, Jane (co-authors) The Raga Guide: A Survey of 74 Hindustani Ragas. Zenith Media, London: 1999.
