= Bilahari =

Janya raga of Carnatic music

- Arohanam: S R₂ G₃ P D₂ Ṡ
- Avarohanam: Ṡ N₃ D₂ P M₁ G₃ R₂ S

Bilahari is a rāgam in Carnatic music (musical scale of South Indian classical music). It is a janya rāgam (derived scale) from the 29th melakarta scale Sankarabharanam. It is a janya scale, as it does not have all the seven swaras (musical notes) in the ascending scale. It is a combination of the pentatonic scale Mohanam and the sampurna raga scale Sankarabharanam.

== Structure and Lakshana ==
Ascending scale with shadjam at C, which is same as Mohanam scale

Descending scale with shadjam at C, which is same as Sankarabharanam scale

Bilahari is an asymmetric rāgam that does not contain madhyamam or nishādham in the ascending scale. It is an audava-sampurna rāgam (or owdava rāgam, meaning pentatonic ascending scale). Its ārohaṇa-avarohaṇa structure (ascending and descending scale) is as follows:

- ārohaṇa : S R₂ G₃ P D₂ Ṡ (Note: Alternate notations: Hindustani: S R G P D Ṡ; Western: C D E G A C) they are used in every song
- avarohaṇa : Ṡ N₃ D₂ P M₁ G₃ R₂ S (Note: Alternate notations: Hindustani: Ṡ N D P M G R S; Western: C B A G F E D C)

The notes used in this scale are shadjam, chathusruthi rishabham, antara gandhara, panchamam and chathusruthi dhaivatham in ascending scale, with kakali nishadham and shuddha madhyamam included in descending scale. For the details of the notations and terms, see swaras in Carnatic music.

This rāgam also uses kaishiki nishadham (N2) as an external note (anya swara) in the descending scale. Hence it is considered a bhashanga rāgam, a scale with notes external to the parent scale.
