= Kathanakuthuhalam =

Melodic framework

- Arohanam: S R₂ M₁ D₂ N₃ G₃ P Ṡ
- Avarohanam: Ṡ N₃ D₂ P M₁ G₃ R₂ S

Kathanakuthuhalam or kathanakuthoohalam, also known as kathanakuthuhala, is a raga in Carnatic music. Patnam Subramania Iyer is credited with inventing this raga. The famous kriti Raghuvamsha Sudhambudhi written by him is in this raga.
