= Janya =

Indian melodic mode derived from a raga in the Melakarta

Janya is a term meaning "derive". In Carnatic (South Indian) music a janya raga is one derived from one of the 72 melakarta ragas (fundamental melodic structures). Janya ragas are classified into various types based on a variety of features.

== Varja ragas ==
Ragas that omit (varjyam, to omit in Sanskrit) one or more of the notes of the scale (swaras) of their parent melakarta raga, in the ascending or descending scale or in both, fall into this category. Different notes may be omitted from the ascending arohana and descending avarohana scale. Such scales are given the names listed below. vrja a

- Sampurna – 7 note scale
- Shadava – 6 notes
- Audava – 5 notes

Since these terms are applicable both to the ascending and the descending scale, ragas can be classified as Audava-Sampurna – 5 notes in ārohaṇa and 7 in the avarohaṇa – Shadava-Sampurna – 6 notes in ārohaṇa and 7 in the avarohaṇa, as in Kambhoji raga and so forth. Sampurna-Sampurna ragas are not necessarily Melakarta because they may use notes not in the parent scale or vakra prayoga, a "zig-zag" scale instead of sequential ascent and descent). Such ragas are termed vakra ragas. Examples are Nalinakanti, Kathanakuthuhalam, Darbaru, Jana Ranjani and Kedaram. See full List of Janya Ragas for more examples.

- Nalinakanti – ārohaṇa S G3 R2 M1 P N3 S, avarohaṇa S N3 P M1 G3 R2 S
- Kathanakuthuhalam – ārohaṇa S R2 M1 D2 N3 G3 P S, avarohaṇa S N3 D2 P M1 G3 R2 S

(see swaras of Carnatic music for an explanation of above notation)

== Upanga/Bhashanga ragas ==
Upanga ragas are strictly derived from their parent melakarta raga and do not use any note not found in the parent raga's scale. Examples of upanga ragas are Shuddha Saveri, Udayaravichandrika and Mohanakalyani. Bhashanga ragas have anya swara(s) (external note; note not found in parent scale) in their ārohaṇa, avarohaṇa or both. Examples of Bhashanga ragas are Kambhoji, Bhairavi, Bilahari, Saranga, Behag and Kāpi.

== Single octave ==
Some janya ragas are sung in only one octave. Moreover, the highest note is not the shadjam (sa), at which the base sruthi (drone) of a performance is set. The classifications in this category are as follows.

- Nishadantya – highest note is the nishadam (ni)
  example Nadanamakriya derived from Mayamalavagowla scale (ārohaṇa S R1 G3 M1 P D1 N3, avarohaṇa N3 D1 P M1 G3 R1 S N3)
- Dhaivathantya – highest note is the dhaivatham (dha)
  example Kurinji derived from Shankarabharanam scale (ārohaṇa S N3 S R2 G3 M1 P D2, avarohaṇa D2 P M1 G3 R2 S N3 S )
- Panchamantya – highest note is the panchamam (pa)
  example Navaroj (ārohaṇa P D2 N3 S R2 G3 M1 P, avarohaṇa M1 G1 R3 S N2 D2 P)

== Karnataka/Desya ragas ==
Karnataka ragas are those that are considered to have originated in Carnatic music. Examples are Shankarabharanam, Lalitha and Shuddha Saveri.

Desya ragas are those ragas that have their origins in other music, majority of them originating in Hindustani music. Examples are Yamunakalyani, Desh, Behag and Sindhu Bhairavi.

== Other classifications ==
There are various other classifications of janya ragas. These are based on relationships with other ragas (they give a feel of a different but similar raga), presence of gamakas (oscillations and graces around the note), stresses on notes or lack of them, the time of day when a raga is sung, rasa or mood that they evoke, etc.

== See also ==
- List of Janya Ragas
- Melakartha
