= Glossary of Carnatic music =

Carnatic music terms are briefly described in this page. Major terms have their own separate article pages, while minor terms are defined / described here.

The order of terms is from basic to related terms, rather than alphabetic.

== Main terms ==
=== Nāda ===
Nāda refers to music or musical sound. It also refers to the tone of a musical instrument.

==== Anahata Nāda ====
Anāhata Nāda refers to the naturally occurring sounds (literally not struck).

==== Ahata Nāda ====
Ahata Nāda refers to generated sounds or sounds made by efforts of man (literally that which is heard). It is of 6 types. 1.shareeraja - it emanates from the human throat. Example: vocal singing 2.Dhanuja - is born from string instruments. Example: Violin, veena etc... 3.Vayuja - us born when air is passed through narrow pipe like instruments. Example: Flute, nadaswaram etc... 4.Charmaja 5. Lohaja 6.Nakhaja

=== Śruti ===
Śruti is musical pitch. It is considered to be equivalent to tonic of western music. This is the pitch at which the drone is set, which is usually played by a tambura.

=== Sthayi ===
In Carnatic music, Sthayi refers to the octave. Madhyama sthayi refers to the middle octave, Tara sthayi refers to the upper octave and Mandra sthayi refers to the lower octave.

=== Swaram ===
Swaram or Swara is a single note. Each swaram defines the position of note in relation to the Śruti.

=== Rāga ===
A rāgam prescribes a set of rules for building a melody - very similar to the Western concept of mode. Different combination of swarams and swaram phrases form different rāgams.

=== Ārōhanam ===
Ārōhanam of a ragam is the ascending scale of the rāgam. It describes the rules for singing ascending notes of a rāgam, including the swarams to use and swaram patterns that form the rāgam.

=== Avarōhanam ===
Avarōhanam of a rāgam is the descending scale of the rāgam. It describes the rules for singing descending notes of a rāgam.

=== Melakartā ===
A Melakartā rāgam is one which has all seven swarams, namely, Sa, Ri, Ga, Ma, Pa, Dha and Ni (sampoorna rāgam). The ārōhanam and avarōhanam of a melakartā ragam are strictly ascending and descending scales. It is also known as janaka rāgam (parent rāgam), because other rāgams are derived from it.

=== Asampūrna Melakartā ===
One of the 72 parent rāgams first created by Venkatamakhin which did not have strict rules of ascending / descending scales, did not insist on inclusion of all 7 swaras nor disallow vakra prayogas (zig zag notes in scale).

=== Chakra ===
A chakra consists of a group of 6 Melakartā rāgams, which differ from each other only in the Dhaivatham and Nishadham.

=== Janya ===
A Janya rāgam is one which is derived from a Melakartā rāgam. It may have (a) a subset of the seven swarams Sa, Ri, Ga, Ma, Pa, Dha and Ni (varjya rāgam), (b) an external swaram (anya swaram) not found in its parent or (c) vakra prayōgam of swarams in Ārōhanam or Avarōhanam (zig-zag sequence of notes, instead of strictly ascending or descending scales).

=== Tālam ===
Tālam refers to the rhythm cycle or beat cycle for a particular song.

=== Ālāpana ===
Ālāpana is a preface to a song, which explores the rāgam of the song, without any lyrics. It is a slow improvisation with no tālam (rhythm).

=== Niraval ===
Sāhitya vinyāsam / Niraval or Neraval is the repeated singing of one or two lines of a song, with improvised exposition in each repetition. Sāhitya vinyāsam in Tamil language is referred as Neraval.

=== Kalpanaswaram ===
Kalpanaswaram literally means imagined swarams. It is the singing of swarams of the rāgam of a song, following the completion of the song. Though many phrases of the swarams may have been practiced, experienced artists may spontaneously play new phrases within the rāgam's rules - hence the term Kalpana. It is an improvisation of the rāgam, by singing the swarams, namely Sa, Ri, Ga, Ma, Pa, Dha and Ni.

=== Tānam ===
Tānam is rhythmic / rhythm based improvisation of the rāgam. It is done with rhythm based syllables like tha, nam, thom and na. It is usually included as second part in a Rāgam Tānam Pallavi.

=== Rāgamālika ===
Rāgamālika, which literally means garland of rāgams, is a composition that has different verses set to different rāgams. Rāgamālika swarams refers to singing of Kalpanaswarams in different rāgams.

=== Rāgam Tānam Palavi ===
Rāgam Tānam Pallavi is a rendition of Carnatic music which lends to total improvisation, in different forms. It consists of Rāgam Ālāpana (rāgam), Tānam and a Pallavi line. The pallavi line is sung many times in different speeds, different ranges of the rāgam and different octaves. This is usually followed by Kalpanaswarams, sometimes in multiple rāgams (rāgamālika).

=== Ugābhōga ===
Ugābhōga (in Kannada) or Viruttam (in Tamil) is a devotional verse or phrase sung (without talam) in an imprompt choice of rāgam or rāgamālika usually before a song. The rāgam (or last rāgam in case of rāgamālika) is usually the same as that of the song that follows.

=== Manōdharma ===
Manōdharma is the concept of imprompt or spontaneous improvisation, which is one of the important aspects of Carnatic music. There are many types of improvisations, like Rāga Ālāpane, Tāna, Sāhityavinyāsa, Ugābhōga and Kalpanāsvara.

=== Kalpita sangeetam ===
Kalpita sangeetam is music that is already composed, learnt and practiced. It is opposite of Manodharma sangeetam, which complements Kalpita sangeetam.

== Swarams ==
The seven swarams in Carnatic music, then followed by other terms related to swaram.

=== Shadjam ===
The first swaram in the scale is Shadjam (Sa). It is invariant and is always included in all ragams.

=== Rishabham ===
The second swaram in the scale is Rishabham (Ri). It has three pitch possibilities, namely Suddha, Chathusruti and Shatsruti.

=== Gandhara ===
The third swaram in the scale is Gāndhāra (Ga). It has three pitch possibilities, namely Śuddha, Sādhārana and Antara.

=== Madhyamam ===
The fourth swaram in the scale is Madhyamam (Ma). It has two pitch possibilities, namely Suddha and Prati.

=== Panchamam ===
The fifth swaram in the scale is 'Panchamam' (Pa). It is invariant.

=== Dhaivatam ===
The sixth swaram in the scale is Dhaivatam (Dha). It has three pitch possibilities, namely Suddha, Chathusruti and Shatshruti.

=== Nishādham ===
The seventh swaram in the scale is Nishādham (Ni). It has three pitch possibilities, namely Suddha, Kaisiki and Kaakali.

=== Anya swaram ===
Anya swaram in a janya rāgam is a swaram that is not found in its parent rāgam (melakartā rāgam). Anya means outside the set/ group.

=== Sthāyi ===
Sthāyi refers to an octave of music. There are 5 sthāyis in Carnaatic music, namely, Anumandara (lowest), Mandara (literally means chant, which means lower), Madhya (literally means middle), Taara (means higher) and Athitaara (meaning very high). Most artists sing over two octaves or two and a half octaves range (within Mandra, Madhya and Taara sthaayis). Very few can sing well in bigger ranges of 3 or more octaves.

=== Anga ===
Anga means part. In the context of a rāgam's scale, the terms poorvaanga (meaning former part, in this case first-half) and uttaraanga (latter part, or second-half) are used. Sa, Ri, Ga and Ma notes in a scale are referred are poorvaanga, while Pa, Dha and Ni are referred as uttaraanga

=== Gamaka ===
Gamaka is the term used for variations of the swarams in a scale. It can refer to the shake of the note, grace around the note, decoration or embellishment of the swaram. It is an integral part of most rāgams, as it is not arbitrary but is essential part of the structure/ scale.

=== Vādi ===
Vādi swaram in a rāgam is the main/ primary swaram of importance in it. A vādi swaram is repeated quite often in a rendition.

=== Samvādi ===
Samvādi swaram in a rāgam has a concordant effect with the vādi swaram. It has a good effect to the ear (melody or pleasing) along with the vādi. In Western music it is equivalent of the consonant.

=== Vivādi ===
Vivādi swaram in a rāgam has a discordant effect with the vādi swaram in it. It may not have a pleasing effect when sounded together, but composers use appropriate phrases so that such discordant effect is skipped or avoided. In Western music it is equivalent of the dissonant.

=== Anuvādi ===
Anuvādi swaram in a rāgam has neither concordant nor discordant effect with the vādi swaram.

== Janthi rāgams ==
=== Prayōgam ===
A musical notes phrase of a rāgam (series of swarams sung in a particular rāgam) is known as Prayōgam.

=== Vishesha Prayōgam ===
Vishesha means special. Hence, important phrases of a rāgam are known as Vishesha Prayōgams.

=== Varjya ===
Missing swarams in a janya rāgam, when derived from a melakartā rāgam are referred as varjya. For example, Rishabham and Panchamam are varjya in Hindolam when derived from Natabhairavi.

=== Vakram ===
Swarams are said to be vakram in a rāgam, if either the Ārōhanam, Avarōhanam or both, do not follow a strictly ascending or descending order. They go up and down (example, 2 steps forward one step back). In such a rāgam, these swarams should always use the same order to give the unique melody of the rāgam.

=== Upānga ===
A janya rāgam is Upānga if all the swarams in its scale are strictly derived from its melakartā rāgam (parent). There are no anya swarams (external swarams).

=== Bhāshānga ===
A janya rāgam is Bhāshānga if an anya swaram is introduced in its scale, when derived from its melakartā rāgam (parent).

=== Nishādhāntya ===
A janya rāgam is Nishādhāntya if the highest note that can be played is the Nishādham. The rules for such rāgams are that they should be played or sung within the single octave - Ni, Sa, Ri, Ga, Ma, Pa, Dha, Ni. Examples are Naadanaa makriya and Punnāgavarāli rāgams.

=== Dhaivatāntya ===
A janya rāgam is Dhaivadhāntya if the highest note that can be played is the Dhaivatam. The rules for such rāgams are that they should be played or sung within the single octave - Dha, Ni, Sa, Ri, Ga, Ma, Pa, Dha. Example Kurinji rāgam.

=== Panchamāntya ===
A janya rāgam is Panchamāntya if the highest note that can be played is the Panchamam. The rules for such rāgams are that they should be played or sung within the single octave - Pa, Dha, Ni, Sa, Ri, Ga, Ma, Pa. Example Navroj rāgam.

=== Madhyama sruti ===
Tuning the sruti (tonic note) to Ma (and also changing Pa string of Tambura to Ma) is called Madhyama sruti. It is usually set for Panchamāntya, Dhaivadhāntya and Nishādhāntya rāgams.

== Swaram counts ==
The following terms are applicable to ascending scale (ārōhanam) of a rāgam, descending scale (avarōhanam) of a rāgam, or the rāgam as a whole.

=== Sampūrna rāgam ===
Sampurna rāgam is a rāgam that has all seven swarams, namely, Sa, Ri, Ga, Ma, Pa, Dha and Ni.

=== Shādava rāgam ===
Shādava rāgam is a rāgam that has only six of the seven swarams in its scale.

=== Owdava rāgam ===
Owdava rāgam is a rāgam that has only five of the seven swarams in its scale. It is a pentatonic scale.

=== Svarantara rāgam ===
Svaraantara rāagam is a rāgam that has only four of the seven swarams in its scale.

== Tālam components ==
=== Jathi ===
Jathi of a tālam specifies beat count of the rhythm cycle. It specifically applies to laghu component(s) of the tālam and not necessarily to the entire tālam. The different jathis are tisra (three beats in lagu), chathusra (four), khanda (five), misra (seven) and sankeerna (nine).

=== Gati ===
Gati of a tālam specifies sub-divisions of a beat in a composition. It is also referred as Nadai. Chathusra gati is the most common (four), followed by Tisra (three). Others are Khanda, Misra and Sankeerna.

=== Laghu ===
Laghu is the component of a tālam which is the variant part. Its beat count is dependent on the jāti of the tālam. The action for counting includes a tap / clap, followed by a count of sub-beats of the full rhythm cycle. Note that a tisra jāti laghu is actually 1 clap and 2 counts = 3 beats.

=== Dhrutham ===
Dhrutham is the component of a tālam which is invariant and includes only two beats. Its action includes a tap / clap, followed by a veechu (wave).

=== Anudhrutham ===
Anudhrutham is the component of a tālam which is invariant and includes only one beat. Its action is a tap / clap.

=== Āvartanam ===
Āvartanam of a tālam refers to one cycle of the tālam. Most tālams have at least 1 laghu, except for the rare tālams (see tālam page).

=== Graham ===
Graham or Eduppu (in Tamil) means start. Eduppu denotes the point within the Āvartanam of a tālam when a composition or stanza in a composition begins. Onru (one beat later, meaning second beat), Onrarai (one and half beat later, meaning between 2nd and 3rd beat) are common, other than Samam (meaning equal) which starts in synchronization with the beginning of a tālam.

== Tālams ==
=== Rūpaka tālam ===
Rūpaka tālam refers to the group of tālams that consist of 1 dhrutam, followed by 1 lagu. Rūpaka tālam also refers to chathusra-jathi rūpaka tālam as a default (2 + 4 = 6 beats in an āvartanam).

=== Triputa tālam ===
Triputa tālam refers to the group of tālams that consist of 1 laghu, followed by 2 dhrutams. Triputa tālam also refers to tisra-jathi triputa tālam as a default (3 + 2 + 2 = 7 beats in an āvartanam).

=== Dhruva tālam ===
Dhruva tālam refers to the group of tālams that consist of 1 lagu, followed by 1 dhrutam, followed by two lagus. Dhruva tālam also refers to chathusra-jathi dhruva tālam as a default (4 + 2 + 4 + 4 = 14 beats in an āvartanam), unless a different jathi is specified.

=== Matya tālam ===
Matya tālam refers to the group of tālams that consist of 1 lagu, followed by 1 dhrutam, followed by 1 lagu. Matya tālam also refers to chathusra-jathi matya tālam as a default (4 + 2 + 4 = 10 beats in an āvartanam).

=== Jhampa tālam ===
Jhampa tālam refers to the group of tālams that consist of 1 lagu, followed by 1 anudhrutam, followed by 1 dhrutam. Jhampa tālam also refers to misra-jathi jhampa tālam as a default (7 + 1 + 2 = 10 beats in an āvartanam).

=== Ata tālam ===
Ata tālam refers to the group of tālams that consist of 2 lagus, followed by 2 dhrutams. Ata tālam also refers to khanda-jathi ata tālam as a default (5 + 5 + 2 + 2 = 14 beats in an āvartanam).

=== Eka tālam ===
Eka tālam refers to the group of tālams that consist of 1 lagu only. Eka tālam also refers to chathusra-jathi eka tālam as a default (4 beats in an āvartanam).

=== Ādhi tālam ===
Ādhi tālam refers to chathusra-jathi triputa tālam (4 + 2 + 2 = 8 beats in an āvartanam), which is very common in Carnatic music. This is the equivalent of 8 beat / 16 beat of Western music.

=== Khanda chāpu tālam ===
Khanda chāpu refers to a tālam with 10 beat āvartanam (Khanda literally means 5) which does not fit into above classification of tālams.

=== Misra chāpu tālam ===
Misra chāpu refers to a tālam with 14 beat āvartanam (Misra literally means 7) which does not fit into above classification of tālams.

=== Desādhi tālam ===
Desādhi refers to ādhi tālam with (8 beat āvartanam), where the eduppu is one and a half beats from beginning of āvaratanam (onrarai).

== Layā ==
Layā is the tempo or speed of a song. Carnatic music does not define a fixed layā to songs, but traditionally some songs have been sung fast or slow and hence are categorised that way. Typical classification of layā includes Vilambitha (delayed or slow), Madhyama (medium) and Dhuritha (fast). The term Chowka is also used to denote an extra slow tempo and Adi-Dhuritha is used to denote an extra fast one.

=== Kāla ===
Kāla refers to the change of tempo during a rendition of song, typically doubling up the speed. Onnaam kaalam is 1st speed, Irandaam kaalam is 2nd speed and so on. Irandaam kaalam fits in twice the number of aksharaas (notes) into the same beat, thus doubling the tempo. Sometimes, Kāla is also used similar to Layā, for example Madhyama Kālam or Chowka Kālam.

== Learning exercises ==
Learning Carnatic music involves most of the following exercises, mostly in the order listed below.

=== Saraḷe varase ===
Saraḷe varase is used to learn the swarams in the octave, usually in Māyāmālavagowla ragam. It is learnt in simple straight ascending and descending fashion and a few variations. It is also learnt in multiple speeds (kalas).

=== Svarāvaḷi ===
Avaḷi means row or arrangement. Svarāvaḷi are exercises with different arrangements of swarams. It is shortened and referred as Saraḷe, as in Saraḷe varise described above.

=== Jaṇṭi varase ===
Jaṇṭi varase are exercises used to learn the swarams in the octave in twin fashion (sa sa ri ri ga ga and so on) and a few other combinations. It is also usually learnt in.There are total of 7-8 swarams.Māyāmālavagowla rāgam.

=== Dāṭu varase ===
Dāṭu (in Kannada) literally means to jump or to skip. Dāṭu varase are exercises used to learn the swarams in zig-zag fashion, so that more control of the notes and different combinations are achieved. Example, sa ma ri ga, sa ri ga ma, and so on. Each of these exercises are set to different tālams, so that different rhythm aspects are learnt.

=== Alaṅkāra ===
Alankāra means beautiful arrangement of swarams. These exercises are groups or patterns of swarams, each of which are set to seven main tālams, so that rhythm aspect is also learnt together with different rāgams.

== Types of composition ==
=== Geetham ===
Geetham means song or melody. Geethams are the first songs that are learnt. They are very short and are the first exercises where singing lyrics along with their swaram patterns are learnt.

=== Swarajati ===
Swarajati lead to learning bigger songs / compositions after learning Geethams. They are set to different rāgams and lead towards learning varnams and kritis.

=== Varnam ===
Varnam is a type of composition which is suited for vocal exercises of a wide variety of Carnatic music aspects, including slow and fast tempo of singing, both lyrics and swarams. It is the most complex of vocal exercises. In modern carnatic concerts, it is usually sung as a first song and is supposed to help warm-up.

=== Keerthanam ===
Keerthanam or Kriti is the category of most compositions in Carnatic music. A concert consists mainly of Keerthanams with zero or one of Varnam, Rāgam Thānam Pallavi and Thillānā included in appropriate order.

=== Kriti ===
For Kriti, see Keerthanam above.

=== Thillana ===
Thillānā is a composition consisting of rhythm syllables, like Dheem, thom, tarana and thaani in first two stanzas, followed by a one or two line lyric. In instrumental performances, it is a melodic rhythmic piece.

== Parts of a composition ==
=== Pallavi ===
Pallavi is the first verse in a composition, especially varnams, Keerthanams or Kritis.

=== Anupallavi ===
Anupallavi is an optional verse that follows the pallavi in a composition, especially keerthanams or kritis.

=== Charanam ===
Charanams are the verse(s) that follow the pallavi or anupallavi (if present).

=== Chittaswaram ===
Chittaswarams are set swaram phrases (solfa passages), in a composition, usually a kriti, appended to enrich its beauty. It is sung at the end of the anupallavi and charanam.

=== Muktāyi swaram ===
Muktāyi swarams are the swaram phrases (solfa passage) that occur after the anupallavi in tāna varnams and which serves as the concluding part of the pūrvanga (first part). This is more related to the songs for dance performances, like Bharatanatyam.

== Other ==
=== Tani avartanam ===
Tani avartanam refers to the extended solo that is played by the percussionists in a concert.

=== Tukkada ===
Tukkadaas are compositions played towards the end of Carnatic concerts.

=== Avadhana Pallavi ===
Avadhana Pallavi is a classical form of performing a composition set to two different talas.

=== Konnakol ===
Konnakol is the art of performing percussion syllables vocally.
