= Performances of Carnatic music =

Carnatic music is usually performed by a small ensemble of musicians, who sit on an elevated stage. This usually consists of at least; a principal performer, a melodic accompaniment, a rhythm accompaniment, and a drone.

The tambura is the traditional drone instrument used in concerts, however, tamburas are increasingly being replaced by śruti boxes, and now more commonly, the "electronic tambura". The drone itself is an integral part of performances and furnishes stability - the equivalent of harmony in Western music.

Performances can be musical or musical-dramatic. Musical recitals are either vocal, or purely instrumental in nature, while musical-dramatic recitals refer to Harikatha. But irrespective of what type of recital it is, what is featured are compositions which form the core of this genre of music.

Carnatic music "mainly represents South India", but it is loved by many people worldwide.

== Instrumentation ==
The tambura is the traditional drone instrument used in concerts. However, tamburas are increasingly being replaced by śruti boxes, and now more commonly, the electronic tambura. The drone itself is an integral part of performances and furnishes stability – the equivalent of harmony in Western music.

In a vocal recital, a concert team may have one or more vocalists as the principal performer(s). Instruments, such as the Saraswati veena and/or venu flute, can be occasionally found as a rhythmic accompaniment, but usually, a vocalist is supported by a violin player (who sits on his/her left). The rhythm accompanist is usually a mridangam player (who sits on the other side, facing the violin player). However, other percussion instruments such as the ghatam, kanjira and morsing frequently also accompany the main percussion instrument and play in an almost contrapuntal fashion along with the beats.

The objective of the accompanying instruments is far more than following the melody and keeping the beats. The accompaniments form an integral part of every composition presented, and they closely follow and augment the melodic phrases outlined by the lead singer. The vocalist and the violinist take turns while elaborating or while exhibiting creativity in sections like raga, niraval and kalpanaswaram.

Unlike Hindustani music concerts, where an accompanying tabla player can keep beats without following the musical phrases at times, in Carnatic music, the accompanists have to follow the intricacies of the composition since there are percussion elements such as eduppu in several compositions.

Some concerts feature a good bit of interaction with the lead musicians and accompanists exchanging notes, and accompanying musicians predicting the lead musician's musical phrases.

== Concert content ==
=== Development of concert format ===
The late Ariyakudi Ramanuja Iyengar, a veteran Carnatic music vocalist, is credited with establishing the contemporary concert format which has been in use by Carnatic musicians to this day.

=== Contemporary concert content ===
A contemporary Carnatic concert (called a katcheri) usually lasts about three hours, and usually comprises a number of varied compositions. Carnatic songs are composed in a particular raga, which means that they do not deviate from the notes in the raga. Each composition is set with specific notes and beats, but performers improvise extensively. Improvisation occurs in the melody of the composition as well as in using the notes to expound the beauty of the raga.

Concerts usually begin with a varnam or an invocatory item which will act as the opening piece. The varnam is composed with an emphasis on swaras of the raga, but will also have lyrics, the saahityam. It is lively and fast to get the audience's attention. An invocatory item, may alternatively, follow the varnam.

After the varnam and/or invocatory item, the artist sings longer compositions called kirtanas (commonly referred to as kritis). Each kriti sticks to one specific raga, although some are composed with more than one raga; these are known as ragamalika (a garland of ragas).

After singing the opening kriti, usually, the performer sings the kalpanaswaram of the raga to the beat. The performer must improvise a string of swaras in any octave according to the rules of the raga and return to beginning of the cycle of beats smoothly, joining the swaras with a phrase selected from the kriti. The violin performs these alternately with the main performer. In very long strings of swara, the performers must calculate their notes accurately to ensure that they stick to the raga, have no awkward pauses and lapses in the beat of the song, and create a complex pattern of notes that an experienced audience can follow.

Performers then begin the main compositions with a section called raga alapana exploring the raga. In this, they use the sounds aa, ri, na, ta, etc. instead of swaras to slowly elaborate the notes and flow of the raga. This begins slowly and builds to a crescendo, and finally establishes a complicated exposition of the raga that shows the performer's skill. All of this is done without any rhythmic accompaniment, or beat. Then the melodic accompaniment (violin or veena), expounds the raga. Experienced listeners can identify many ragas after they hear just a few notes. With the raga thus established, the song begins, usually with lyrics. In this, the accompaniment (usually violin, sometimes veena) performs along with the main performer and the percussion (such as a mridangam). In the next stage of the song, they may sing niraval or kalpanaswaram again.

In most concerts, the main item will at least have a section at the end of the item, for the percussion to perform solo (called the tani avartanam). The percussion performers perform complex patterns of rhythm and display their skill. If multiple percussion instruments are employed, they engage in a rhythmic dialogue until the main performer picks up the melody once again. Some experienced artists may follow the main piece with a ragam thanam pallavi mid-concert, if they do not use it as the main item.

Following the main composition, the concert continues with shorter and lighter songs. Some of the types of songs performed towards the end of the concerts are tillanas and thukkadas - bits of popular kritis or compositions requested by the audience. Every concert that is the last of the day ends with a mangalam, a thankful prayer and conclusion to the musical event.

== Audience ==
The audience of a typical concert has a reasonable understanding of Carnatic music. It is also typical to see the audience tapping out the tala in sync with the artist's performance. As and when the artist exhibits creativity, the audience acknowledge it by clapping their hands. With experienced artists, towards the middle of the concert, requests start flowing in. The artist usually plays the request and it helps in exhibiting the artist's broad knowledge of the several thousand kritis that are in existence.

== Redefining the concert Experience ==
There have been various attempts to modify and expand the traditional Carnatic concert format. Musicians including G. N. Balasubramaniam, M. S. Subbulakshmi, M. Balamuralikrishna, L. Subramaniam, U. Srinivas, Raleigh Rajan and T. M. Krishna, among others, have introduced changes to the presentation and structure of Carnatic concerts, with varying degrees of acceptance and success.

In August 2025, composer Raleigh Rajan presented a Carnatic concert in Dallas, Texas, based entirely on the Tamil epic Kamba Ramayanam with chordal harmony. In addition to traditional instruments including the mridangam, violin, kanjira and tanpura, the concert incorporated the piano, which was used for both harmonic accompaniment and melodic passages strictly within Carnatic ragas. The program also included poetry appreciation segments preceding individual pieces and digital paintings displayed as a visual backdrop experience.

== Modern concerts ==
Every December, the city of Chennai in India has its six-week-long Music Season, which has been described as the world's largest cultural event. The Music Season was started in 1927, to mark the opening of the Madras Music Academy. It used to be a traditional month-long Carnatic music festival, but since then it has also diversified into dance and drama, as well as non-Carnatic art forms. The music season in Chennai is in the month of Margashira - Marghazhi in Tamil and comes to an end with the festival of Makara Shankrati or Pongal. The cultural hub of Karnataka, Mysore - Bangalore region celebrates its Music Season known as Ramnavami Music Festival for a period of 45 days. Unlike the Madras Season which are held in closed auditoriums, the Ramanavami Music Festival is mostly held in Open Air Auditoriums. The pleasant Chaitra - month of Kannada Calendar and evening showers make up the event much more celebrous. In Mysore, the concerts are held in Shri Bidaram Krishnappa Mandira and Jaganmohana Palace. Apart from these, many other smaller sabhas in Bangalore, Mysore, Hassan, Shimoga and Chikmagalur also conduct concerts in this festive season.

Jagadeesh kumar (2026) :worlds first carnatic trumpet kacheri performed by former rastrapathy bhavan violinist
