= Mudicondan Venkatarama Iyer =

South Indian Carnatic musician

Mudikondan Venkatrama Iyer
- Born: 15 October 1897; Mudikondan, Tiruvarur district, Tamilnadu
- Died: 13 September 1975 (aged 77); Chennai, Tamilnadu
- Occupation: vocalist
- Children: Kamakshi, Mathuram
- Parent(s): Chakrapani Iyer, Kamakshi

Mudikondan Venkatarama Iyer (Tamil: முடிகொண்டான் வெங்கடராம ஐயர்; 15 October 1897 – 13 September 1975) was a South Indian Carnatic music singer and musicologist. He was also known as Mudikondan (sometimes spelt Mudicondan) - the name of his native village.

== Background ==
Venkatarama Iyer was born in Mudikondan, a small village in the Nannilam taluk of Tiruvarur district in Tamil Nadu, India to parents Chakrapani Iyer and Kamakshi. His father was a singer of Hindu religious hymns while his maternal grandfather Srivanchiyam Swaminatha Iyer rendered padams and javalis with lilt that earned him the pet name 'talukku' Swaminatha Iyer. His uncle Bommalattam Mani Iyer was also a famous musician.

== Education ==
Mudikondan's father wanted him to learn English, so he went to college in Chennai (then called Madras) after school. However, his father died, which forced him to leave college and return to his village. He then decided to receive formal training in Carnatic music. He furthered his education with help from Konerirajapuram Vaidyanatha Iyer. He learned tala and laya from a 'Tavil Vidwan' known as Ammachatram Kandaswami Pillai. Simizhi Sundaram Iyer taught him the bhava aspect. Swaminatha Iyer came from Saint Tyagaraja's lineage while Sundaram Iyer was from Muthuswami Dikshitar's lineage. This ensured that Mudikondan acquired a very rich repertoire of Krithis.

He also spoke many languages, including Tamil, Telugu, Sanskrit, and English, had a working knowledge of Astrology and Ayurveda, and frequently prepared herbal medicines at home.

== Music career ==
Mudikondan's inaugural concert took place at Cuddalore when he was 17 years old. In 1919, he performed his first concert in Chennai under the auspices of the Mylapore Sangeetha Sabha.

Mudikondan was an expert in rendering Ragam Thanam Pallavi. He had information at his finger tips. When anyone wanted to clear a doubt, he could explain without referring to any book. He would answer the dispute without ambiguity. He lived in his native village and taught students there.

The Hindu newspaper reported that Mudikondan was "a great debater on the nuances of music and he used to explain in a remarkable way even obscure points." From 1935 onward he regularly attended the Madras Music Academy's annual conference. He was an expert on both Lakshana and Lakshya aspects of Carnatic music. He explained the correct way of rendering niraval, ragam, tanam, and pallavi. Dr. V. Raghavan, President of the Music Academy successfully convinced him to move to Chennai. Mudicondan moved to Chennai in 1948 and thereafter took a very active role in the Academy's activities. Around this time he was awarded the coveted Sangeetha Kalanidhi title in 1949. He was appointed Vice-Principal of the Teachers' College of Music. He became its principal in 1956 succeeding illustrious predecessors such as Tiger Varadachariar, Appa Iyer, and Valadi Krishna Iyer. He published many articles from time to time. They have been reproduced in the Souvenir Publication of the Chennai Music Academy.

According to The Hindu, his lecture and demonstrations at the annual conferences of the Music Academy were well-attended by scholars, students, and professionals. In 1952 he gave a presentation of a Pallavi in Simhanandana Tala that made waves (128 aksharas). He retired from the Teachers' College of Music in 1972, but continued there as an Honorary Professor. His disciple Vedavalli was awarded Sangeet Kalanidhi title in 2000. Mudikondan's namesake musicologist T. L. Venkatarama Iyer, who became a Supreme Court judge, was also awarded Sangeet Kalanidhi in 1944, five years before Mudikondan.

== Awards ==
- Sangeetha Kalanidhi, 1949 by Madras Music Academy
- Sangeet Natak Akademi Award, 1961 by Sangeet Natak Akademi
- Sangeetha Kalasikhamani, 1971 by The Indian Fine Arts Society, Chennai

== Death ==
After a short illness, Mudicondan died on 13 September 1975 in Chennai. He was 77.
