= Katcheri =

Type of Southern Indian music ensemble

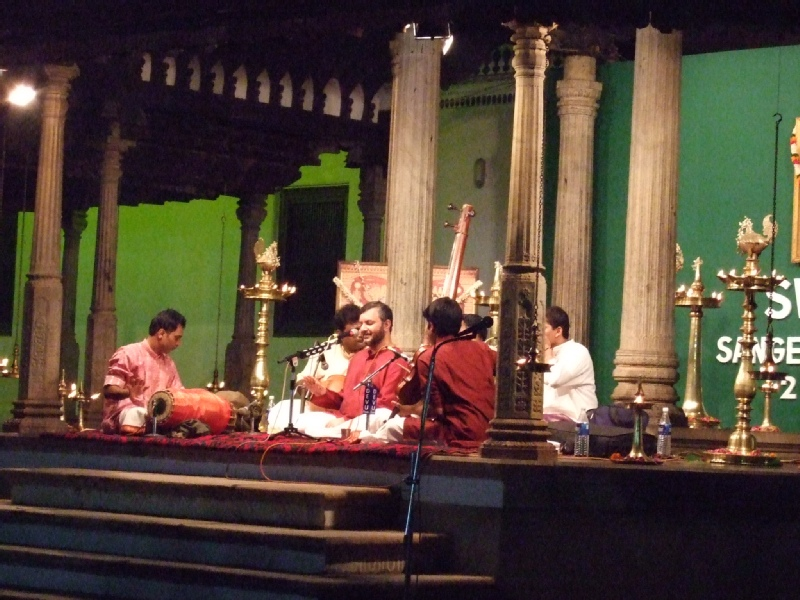
A katcheri by Rama Varma

A katcheri is an assembly of musicians and audience in the context of Carnatic music. It is presented in the concert format. The music fraternity of connoisseurs and common people assemble at the katcheri venues to listen to classical music concerts of vidwans. Etymologically the word "katcheri" is derived from Urdu language and in Hindi to mean a court of law.

Vocalist Ariyakudi Ramanuja Iyengar (1890–1967) established the modern katcheri (concert) traditions in Carnatic music. Among the women artists, M.L. Vasanthakumari and D.K. Pattammal pioneered the promotion of kutcheri culture. Among the most notable vocalists the first woman artist to receive the highest civilian award of Bharat Ratna in 1998 was M. S. Subbulakshmi (1916–2004); who had started her career with her very first katcheri given when she was just 15 years old. It was a big hit among audience and music critics.

== History ==
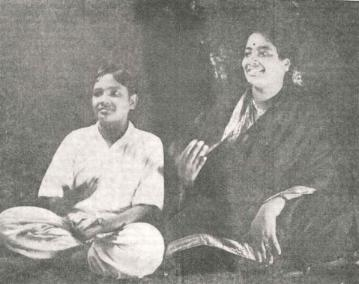
Concert singing by D K Pattammal

The word katcheri used in the context of Carnatic music concert has its origin also as the Hindi language word "kachehri". Its adoption to connote the Carnatic music is traced to its initial meaning as a court, a government office where people gather. During the Maratha rule (1670–1800) in Tanjavur of present-day Tamil Nadu, it was probably adopted in the lexicon of Carnatic music, as, during this period, it was the durbar of the king. It was not a separate or remote place, but a hall, a venue where people were given an audience by the king to dispense with matters of the state. It also happened to be the place where people from all walks of life presented their "aspirations and concerns" before the king. It was at this place that musicians presented their musical achievements before the kings. It is this commonality of events at the same venue as the court or durbar that the Carnatic musical soirees presented by musicians of repute came to be termed as the kutcheri. This, over the last more than a century, has not only literally known to represent a venue but also signifies a select gathering connoting the cultural significance of Carnatic music. This is the origin of concept of musical concerts which has dominated the music scenario of southern India.

== Format ==
The modern format for the katcheri conceived by Ariyakudi Ramanuja Iyengar in the 1930s with a rich blend of traditional Carnatic music rendered by the past masters, particularly the Trinity of Carnatic music of Tyagaraja, Muthuswami Dikshitar and Syama Sastri, was best suited to the wide and varied gamut of audience tastes; the aim was to make it just long enough to sustain the interest of the public in Carnatic Music. The repertoire was conceived taking into view the musical adaptations in theater and drama. The choice of the vocalist with a pliant voice and repertoire of songs that would attract the attention of the audience for long hours of the concert was considered essential. The katcheri also catered to the need of commercial entertainment and aesthetics. The duration of katcheri was prescribed by the Musical Academy of Madras to 3 hours. The concert starts with a varnam, a form perfected by musicians of yore as it created a relaxed atmosphere to the vocalist leading to a wide spectrum of musical compositions. This is followed by many kritis (musical compositions) and ragas (melodies). This sequence riveted the mood of the audience and enabled the performer to go through the performance with elan. The classical songs are preambled by an extended elaboration of melody called the alapana with balanced rhythm topped by pallavi (thematic lines of the song). The concert is concluded with rendering of padam (a musical composition), javali, and songs with national themes which would hold the attention and appreciation of the audience.

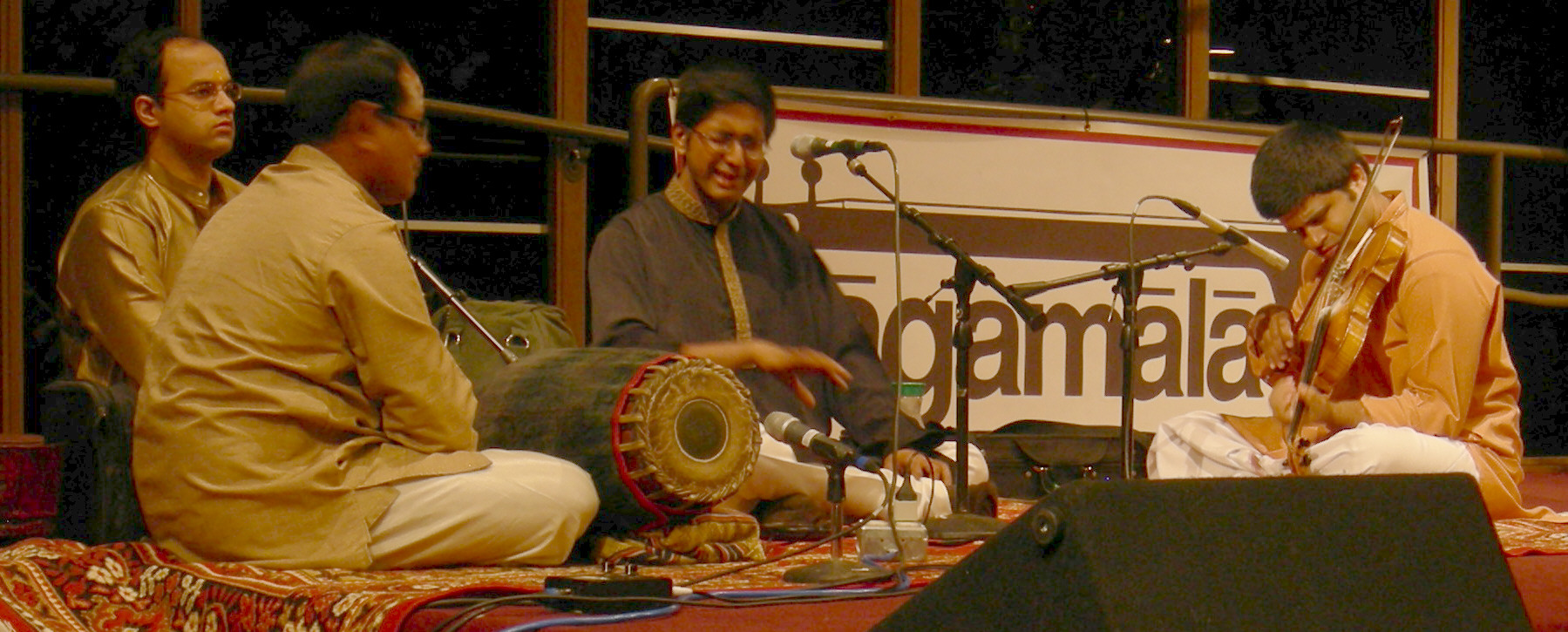
Carnatic vocal concert

A katcheri of Carnatic music is generally of vocal music. The ambiance at a katcheri is "restrained and dignified" whereas in the case of the "mehfil" which represents concert format of the Hindustani music there is "characteristic abandon". In this format the katcheris have attracted highly talented musicians in recent times and involved hundreds of musicians in the genre of vocal music, vainikas, instrumentalists playing violin, flute and so forth. In the katcheri music format, songs are rendered in a medium and fast tempo. This compared to the Hindustani Concert, which is in a slow and very slow tempo, takes about half the time in rendering.

However, the 'katcheri' performance held a part of wedding receptions held in the presence of connoisseurs of music gives musicians opportunity present their musical repertoire and adaptation skills of compositions and erudite knowledge of music. The songs rendered in such katcheris highlight a particular raga duly informing the audience the nature of the melody which has a set of lines sung in a fixed rhythmic cycle. In such rendering each line of the song the refrain is rendered in different rhythmic styles with due adherence to the "metric structure of the set cycle". The theme of the songs covers many subjects.

Also, during the katcheris, a game known as "kanakari" is played in which challenges are posed to the audience with a clue to decipher an item concealed within a song. Another challenge posed is by rendering ten ragas or melodies symbolizing the ten directions which the audience are asked to identify and state which raga represents which direction. This highlights the musical skill of the musician and for this he is rewarded.

== Bibliography ==
- Arkin, A.J.; Magyar, K.P.; Pillay, G.J. (1989). The Indian South Africans: a contemporary profile. Owen Burgess. ISBN 978-0-947446-11-6.
- Diggavi, Mysore Gopalarao (1981). A guide to intelligent appreciation of Hindustani and Karnatak music. Copies from M.G. Diggavi.
- Menon, Indira (2004). Great masters of carnatic music, 1930–1965. Indialog Publications. ISBN 9788187981534.
- Krishna, T. M. (24 December 2013). A Southern Music. HarperCollins Publishers India. ISBN 978-93-5029-822-0.
- Madras Music Academy (2000). The Journal of the Music Academy, Madras. Music Academy.
- Subramanian, Lakshmi (1 January 2008). New Mansions for Music: Performance, Pedagogy and Criticism. Berghahn Books. ISBN 978-81-87358-34-3.
