= Paluke Bangaaramaayena =

Telugu Hindu devotional song

Paluke Bangaramayena
- by Bhadrachala Ramadasu
- Period: Indian classical music
- Genre: Devotional song
- Style: Carnatic music; Kirtan
- Language: Telugu
- Meter: Raga: Ananda Bhairavi; Tala: Adi
- Melody: Mangalampalli Balamuralikrishna
- Composed: c. 1620 – 1680 Bhadrachalam

"Paluke Bangaramayena" one of the famous Telugu compositions by the 17th century composer and devotee of Lord Sri Rama, Bhadrachala Ramadasu. He is known to have composed hundreds such songs however the original music is lost.

Indian Carnatic vocalist Mangalampalli Balamuralikrishna set music to these songs in the 1950s and popularized them. These have become one of the most famous renditions. Subsequently, many versions of this song have been sung.

== Pallavi ==
పలుకే బంగారమాయెనా కోదండపాణి

పలుకే బంగారమాయెనా ||

Transliteration

Paluke bangaramayena, Kodanda paani, Paluke bangarmayena,

Translation Your words have become as precious as gold, O one who wields the divine Kodanda bow in your hand, your words have become as precious as gold,

== Anupallavi ==
పలుకే బంగారమయె పిలిచిన పలుకవేమి

కలలో నీ నామస్మరణ మరవ చక్కని తండ్రి

పలుకే బంగారమాయెనా ||

Transliteration

Paluke bangaramaye, pilachina palukavemi,

Kalalo nee nama smarana maruva chakkani thandri |Paluke bangaramayena...|

Translation

Your words have become as rare as gold, and you refuse to say anything even if I call unto you,

Even in my dreams I cannot forget the chanting of your name, O beautiful father of mine

== Charanam 1 ==
ఇరవూగ ఇసుకలోన పొరలీన ఉడుత భక్తికి

కరుణించి బ్రోచితివని నెరనమ్మితిని తండ్రి

పలుకే బంగారమాయెనా ||

Transliteration

Iravuga isukalona poralina udutha bhaktiki

Karuninchi brochithivani nera nammithini thandri |Paluke bangaramayena...|

Translation

For the devotion shown by a squirrel rolling in the sand (to help you build the bit Rama Setu)

You mercifully showered grace on it, I believed this about you O father staunchly

== Charanam 2 ==
రాతినాతిగ జేసి భూతలమున

ప్రఖ్యాతి జెందితివని ప్రీతితో నమ్మితి తండ్రి

పలుకే బంగారమాయెనా ||

Transliteration

Raathi nathiga jesi bhoothalamuna

Prakhyathi chendithivani, preethi tho nammithi thandri |Paluke bangaramayena...|

Translation

By changing a stone into a woman (Ahalya), in this world

you became famous, I believed this about you O father with great love

== Charanam 3 ==
ఎంత వేడిన గాని సుంతైన దయ రాదు

పంతము సేయ నేనెంతటి వాడను తండ్రి

పలుకే బంగారమాయెనా ||

Transliteration

Entha vedina gaani, sunthaina daya raadhu

Panthamu seya, nEnenthati vaadanu thandri |Paluke bangaramayena...|

Translation

No matter how much I plead with you, why do I not see even a small amount of compassion from you

To be obstinate with me like this, how much of a creature do you think I am O father

== Charanam 4 ==
శరణాగతత్రాణ బిరుదాంకితుడవు గాదా

కరుణించు భద్రాచలవర రామదాస పోష

పలుకే బంగారమాయెనా ||

Transliteration

Sharanaga tatrana, birudhankitudavu kaava

Karuninchu, bhadrachala vara ramadasa posha |Paluke bangaramayena...|

Translation

"Refuge of the needy", isn't that the title you have been conferred with

Show mercy, O protector of Bhadrachala Ramadasa!

== See also ==
- List of Carnatic composers
