= G. N. Balasubramaniam =

Indian carnatic singer (1910–1965)

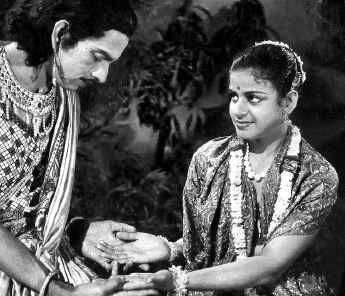
- G. N. Balasubramaniam and M. S. Subbulakshmi in the 1940 Tamil film Shakuntala

Background information
- Born: 6 January 1910
- Origin: Gudalur, Mayavaram, Mayiladuthurai district, Madras Presidency, British India
- Died: 1 May 1965 (aged 55) Madras, Madras State, India
- Genre: Carnatic music - Indian Classical Music
- Occupation: Singer
- Years active: 1920–1965

Gudalur Narayanaswamy Balasubramaniam (6 January 1910 – 1 May 1965), popularly known as GNB, was an Indian Carnatic singer. He innovated the art through emphasis on laya control and reducing the gamakas which eventually made Carnatic music appeal to the lay person and the learned alike. He was also a Tamil film actor. Ariyakudi Iyengar inspired him.

He was born in Gudalur, a small village in the south Indian state of Tamil Nadu (then called the Madras Presidency), which is close to Mayavaram. He was the son of G V Narayanaswamy Iyer, who was a music student. Throughout his younger years, he closely observed the techniques of the musicians of his day. Ariyakudi Ramanuja Iyengar became his manasika guru and inspiration. While his father hoped that GNB would become a successful lawyer, he was intent on pursuing his musical ambitions. Studied at The Hindu Higher Secondary School, Triplicane https://www.hinduhighschool.com/alumni/index.htm. He completed his BA (Hons) in English Literature at the Christian College, Chennai, and took up a short music course at Annamalai University. under the guidance of T S Sabesa Iyer, but discontinued due to ill health. However, he joined the diploma course in music at Madras University in the first batch and Tiger Varadhachariar was the principal. Within 2 years, he was ready for concert performances. He gave his first concert in 1928.

== Career ==
He acted in films, including Bama Vijayam (1934), Sathi Anusuya (1937), Sakuntalai (1940), Udayanan Vasavadatta (1947) (with Vasundhara Devi, mother of Vijayanthimala) and Rukmangadhan (1947). In "Sakunthalai", he appeared as Dushyantha, alongside the vocalist M.S. Subbulakshmi. M.S. Subbulakshmi was fascinated by his music and embraced his style completely in her early years as mentioned in the book M S - A Life in Music by TJS George. After a short stint in the film industry, GNB returned to the Carnatic music fraternity, until his passing in 1965.

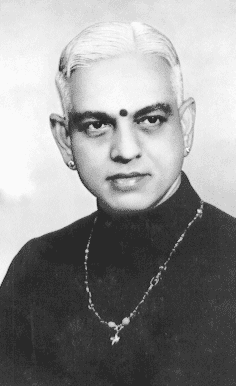
G. N. Balasubramaniam

GNB was known for brigha-laden and brisk music, and emerged as one of the most prominent Carnatic musicians of the era, drawing hundreds of people to each concert. He was famous for his renderings of "Vathapi Ganapathim" by Mutthuswamy Dikshitar and "Vinayaka Ninnu vina" by E. V. Ramakrishna Bhagavathar, both in the ragam Hamsadhwani. It was after hearing his rapid rendition of Vathapi that his father placed him under formal music training. He also frequently sang songs in the ragam Panthuvarali, such as "Paripalaya Sarasiruha" and "Siva Siva Siva", composed by Maharaja Swathi Thirunal and Tyagaraja Swami respectively. After singing either a long main piece or a Ragam Tanam Pallavi, famous ones being "Unadarishanam Kidaikumo" in Kalyani and "Tilai Eesanai Ka" in Kambhoji, he would finish the concert with his popular bhajans and thukuddas, most notably "Dikku Teriyadha Kaatil" by Subramanya Bharati, "Radha Mukha Kamala" in the ragam Hindustani Kapi by Sri Papanasam Sivan, and "Radha Sametha Krishna" in the raga Misra Yaman.

Sri GNB also released many records over his career, most notably the krithi "Vasudevayani" in the ragam Kalyani by Saint Tyagaraja, which reportedly earned him Rs 10,000, or around ₹818,153.88 in the present day. Other songs he was famous for include "Brochevarevarura" in Kamas by Mysore Vasudevachariar, "Marukelara O Raghava" in the ragam Jayanthasri by Saint Tyagaraja, "Maragathavallim Manasa" in Kamboji by Mutthuswamy Dikshitar, "Swaminatha Paripalaya" in Nattai by Mutthuswamy Dikshitar, "Ragasudha rasa" in Andholika by Saint Tyagaraja, and others.

He composed over 250 krithis, most in Telugu with a few in Sanskrit and Tamil. GNB also invented new ragas. He taught a number of students during his active years. Most famous among them are M. L. Vasanthakumari, Radha-Jayalakshmi duo, Tanjore S. Kalyanaraman, Trichur V. Ramachandran, T. R. Balu, T. S. Balasubramanian, and Ragini.

== Administrative role ==
GNB worked as the Deputy Chief Producer of Carnatic Music, in A.I.R Chennai for a number of years alongside Semmangudi Srinivasa Iyer who was the Chief Producer for Carnatic Music, and Dr. M. Balamuralikrishna who was the Producer for Light Music. GNB joined the Swathi Thirunal College of Music, Thiruvananthapuram, Kerala as Principal in March 1964.

== Personal life ==
He described the world of music as a perilous jungle and discouraged his sons and daughters from learning it. His health deteriorated after a major stroke in the late 1950s. He died on 1 May 1965, aged 55.

== Compositions (partial list) ==
Composition	Type	Raga	Tala	Language	Other Info
Amboruha Padame	Varnam	Ranjani	Adi	Telugu	In praise of Shakthi
Bharama Baluni	Krithi	Hamsanadam	Adi	Telugu	In praise of Parashakthi
Bhuvanatreya	Krithi	Mohanam	Adi	Sanskrit	In praise of Sasta
Enn Manathamarai	Krithi	Ritigoulam	Adi	Tamil	In praise of Shakti
Entho Muralida	Krithi	Kanada	Rupakam	Telugu	In praise of Shakti
Gathi Veravarama	Krithi	Bhairavi	Misrachapu	Telugu	In praise of Kamakshi
Intha Paraaku Neeve	Krithi	Bhairavi	Adi	Telugu	In praise of Bhairavi
Kamala Charane	Krithi	Amruthabehag	Adi	Sanskrit	In praise of Shakti
Karimukha Varada	Krithi	Naatai	Adi	Sanskrit	In praise of Ganesha
Karuna Jooda Radha	Krithi	Sahana	Adi	Telugu	In praise of Parashakthi
Kavalai Ellam	Krithi	Saraswati	Adi	Tamil	In praise of Shakthi
Madhurapuri Kalyani	Krithi	Purvi Kalyani	Misrachapu	Sanskrit	In praise of Shakthi
Manasaraga	Krithi	Abhogi	Adi	Telugu	In praise of Shakthi
Marivere Gathi	Krithi	Malavi	Adi	Telugu	In praise of Prashakthi
Maravakune Ninnu	Krithi	Arabhi	Adi	Telugu	In praise of Shakthi
Nakabhaya Vara	Krithi	Naataikurinji	Rupakam	Telugu	In praise of Parashakthi
Nee Charanambhujamunu	Krithi	Keeravani	Adi	Telugu	In praise of Shakthi
Nee Daya Raadaa	Varnam	Andolika	Adi	Telugu	In praise of Shakthi
Nee Padame Gati	Krithi	Nalinakanthi	Rupakam	Telugu	In praise of Shakthi
Nee Samanamevaru	Krithi	Shubhapanthuvarali	Adi	Telugu	In praise of Shakthi
Nirvadhi Sukhadayaki	Krithi	Malayamarutham	Rupakam	Telugu	In praise of Shakthi
Paritaapamu Ieka	Krithi	Shanmukhapriya	Adi	Telugu	In praise of Shakthi
Paraanmukhamela	Krithi	Kaanada	Adi	Telugu	In praise of Shakthi
Paramakrupasaagari	Krithi	Yadukulakambhoji	Rupakam	Telugu	In praise of Shakthi
Ranjani Niranjani	Krithi	Ranjani	Adi	Telugu	In praise of Shakthi
Sada Palaya Sarasakshi	Krithi	Mohanam	Adi	Sanskrit	In praise of Shakthi
Santhathamu Ninne Korithini	Krithi	Valaj	Adi	Telugu	In praise of Shakthi
Saraswati Namostute	Krithi	Saraswati	Rupakam	Sanskrit	In praise of Saraswati
Shankara Mahadeva	Krithi	Devamanohari	Adi	Telugu	In praise of Shakthi
Chakra Raja Nilaye	Krithi	Siva Sakthi	Adi	Sanskrit	In praise of Shakthi
Shivananda kamavardhani	Krithi	Kamavardani	Adi	Sanskrit	In praise of Shakthi
Vara Vallabha Ramana	Krithi	Hamsadhwani	Adi	Sanskrit	In praise of Ganesha

== See also ==
- List of Carnatic composers
