= Manodharma =

Form of South Indian classical Carnatic music

Manodharma is a form of improvised South Indian classical Carnatic music. It is created on the spot during the performance, while remaining within the confines of musical grammar, as codified in the raga and/or the tala. Every Carnatic concert has one or many music pieces that showcases the singer's prowess and intellect in the form of Manodharma sangeetham. Often the centerpiece of a Carnatic concert will explore all the five types of manodharma. It serves as an important and integral aspect of Carnatic music.

== Types of Manodharma ==
Based out of manodharma, individual styles are developed. Manodharma has many aspects and performers develop distinct styles based on their musical values, interpretation and understanding. There is ample scope for manodharma when rendering raga alapana, tanam, neraval, pallavi, swaram and also kritis.

There are five improvisational forms that fall under the practice of manodharma in Carnatic Music. They include:

Alapana: A free flowing exploration of melody using specific syllables. A performer does not need to worry about rhythm and beat cycles while engaging in alapana. However the laya, aesthetic and length of the following composition will often determine how the alapna is presented.

Taanam: A free flowing exploration that couples melody with rhythm (though there is no specific beat cycle)

Kalpana Swara: Using swaras (or solfeggio notes) the performer improvises note combinations on the spot, varying the speed of phrases, and must do so with strict adherence to a beat cycle. Kalpana Swara improvisation is usually performed in the middle of the presentation of a composition.

Neraval: The performer focuses on a line of their choice with lyrical depth and performs the line in various ways. This form of improvisation can be done with particular attention to the treatment of words and must stay within the rhythmic beat cycle.

Pallavi, Viruttam, and Shloka: The performer uses poetic lines and improvises on them much like an alapana, without a bound rhythmic structure.

== Cultivating Manodharma ==
Manodharma is cultivated after several years of constant learning, assimilating and experimenting with various forms of compositions like varnams, kritis, javalis, etc. and also by listening to consummate artistes. It is also informed by a strict and rigorous guru-shishya relationship where a guru works with their student to develop their unique voice and improvisational style. The guidance of a guru is integral in cultivating a musician's sensitivity to the complexities and nuances of raga and how it plays out in lyrical compositions as well as the various forms of manodharma mentioned above.

Manodharma plays such a significant role that a capable artiste may never render a raga the same way twice. To bring out the quintessence of a raga, one has to resort to the exclusive and distinct raga prayogas, or identifiable phrases of the raga which are mostly taken from the 'set compositions' like varnams and kritis.

Unless these prayogas are brought out in the raga alapana, the identity of the raga can seldom be established. For a beginner to identify a raga, these "exclusive" prayogas are of immense assistance. Keeping in mind the "lakshana" (swarupa) of the raga, its jeeva swaras and also the special prayogas, the artistes develop the raga, weaving patterns after patterns, using various combinations of swaras.

== Famous musicians ==
The caliber and finesse of a musician is often judged by their ability to bring out the excellence of a raga. Many musicians of the recent past, such as G. N. Balasubramaniam, Madurai Mani Iyer, Rajarathnam Pillai, Karukurichi Arunachalam, excelled in their application of manodharma bringing in many a combination of notes of melodies, while limiting themselves to the confines of the raga concerned, embellishing the raga with their ability to produce melodic prayogas.
