= Swarajati =

Carnatic music form

Swarajati is a form in Carnatic music, which is helpful before learning a varnam. It has pallavi, sometimes an anupallavi, and at least one charanam. The themes of swarajathis are usually either bhakti, love or courage. It is a composition which usually has a pleasing melody and are suitable for singing in early lessons, musical concerts and dance concerts. The most popular and the oldest known Swarajathi is in Huseni raga, E Mayaladira in Telugu by Melattur Venkatarama Sastry. Swarajatis have been composed in numerous raagas - Bilahari, Hamsadhwani, Kalyani, Janjuti, Kamas, etc.
