= Renuka Arun =

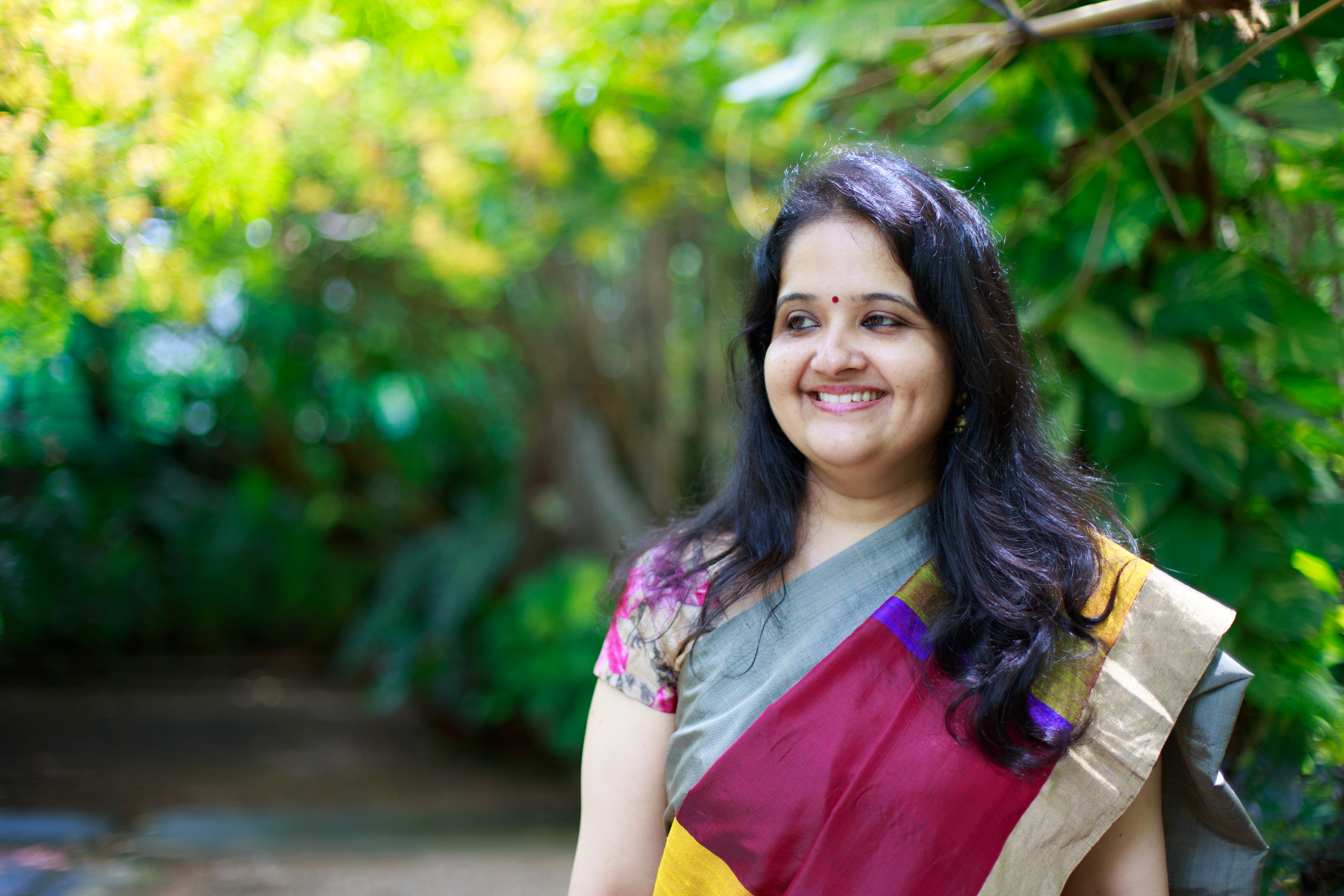
- Singer

Background information
- Born: Renuka; 5 July 1981 (age 44)
- Origin: Perumbavoor, Kerala, India
- Genres: Playback singer Carnatic music
- Occupation: Vocalist
- Years active: 2000–present
- Website: https://renukaarun.in/

Renuka Arun is a classical music singer and play back singer in Malayalam and Telugu. She is the Gulf-Andhra Music Award (GAMA) winner for the best playback singer in Telugu for the year 2017.

Renuka is a veteran of Carnatic music circuit, with more than 550 concerts to her credit. She started her music lessons at the age of 4. She gained instant popularity with the rendering of song 'Endaro' in the Telugu movie Bhale Bhale Magadivoy

In addition to her Performances of Carnatic music and film playback singing, Renuka teaches music at a music school in Ernakulam. She is a regular columnist on music in Mathrubhumi news paper

== Early life and career ==
Renuka was born in Perumbavoor in Kerala. She works as an IT professional. Renuka conducted her first concert while in grade 7. Renuka was a regular in fusion music scene in Kerala. She was also involved with Flamenco dancer Bettina's group of fusion music. She has been learning music under the tutelage of Chandramana Narayanan Namboodiri for the last 30 years

== Playback singer ==
=== Notable film songs ===
Renuka gained wide spread accolades for the song Endaro and Sitha Kalayanam

=== Telugu songs ===
Year	Film	Song	Music director	Co-singer(s)	Film director
2015	Bhale Bhale Magadivoy	"Endaro"	Gopi Sundar	-	Maruthi

=== Malayalam songs ===
Year	Film	Song	Music director	Co-singer(s)	Film director
2017	Solo (2017 film)	"Sitha Kalyanam"	Sooraj S. Kurup	Sooraj S. Kurup	Bejoy Nambiar
2021	The Great Indian Kitchen	"Neeye Bhoovin"	Sooraj S. Kurup	Sooraj S. Kurup	Jeo Baby
2022	Palthu Janwar	"Pinchu Paithal"	Justin Varghese	Solo	Sangeeth P. Rajan

== Awards and nominations ==
Year	Award	Category	Film	Result
2017	Gulf Andhra Music Awards	Best Female Singer Telugu	Bhale Bhale Magadivoy	Won
