= Ragam Thanam Pallavi =

Form of singing in Carnatic music

Ragam Tanam Pallavi (RTP) is a form of singing in Carnatic music that allows the musicians to improvise to a great extent. It is one of the most complete aspects of Indian classical music, demonstrating the entire gamut of talents and the depth of knowledge of the musician. It incorporates raga alapana, tanam, niraval, and kalpanaswara. In more elaborate ragam tanam pallavis, a tani avartanam may follow.

== Ragam ==
"Ragam" in the context of "Ragam Tanam Pallavi" refers to raga alapana - the first component. In this form of pure melodic improvisation, the musician starts with a refrain to create the mood of raga and lays a foundation for composition to follow. Each Ragam tanam pallavi has at least one raga associated with it.

== Tanam ==
Tanam is one of the most important forms of the improvisation, and is integral to the RTP. It is the second component of this composite form of improvisation. Originally developed for the veena, it consists of expanding the raga with syllables "a-nam-tam". The origin of this usage is not very clear. It could have originated from the sanskrit word "tanyate" (what is elaborated) or "tena" indicative of an auspicious object. Tanam is rendered as a rhythmic variation of raga alapana, in chaturasra nadai, though there is no specific talam that is followed.

Some artists sing a ragamalika tanam too. Tanam is almost always rendered without percussion accompaniment; the element of rhythm is embedded within the repetition of the syllables "a-nam-tham". It is rendered in medium speed and just before commencing the third component of this composite form of improvisation; the pallavi.

== Pallavi ==
The word Pallavi is derived from the three syllables Pa - Pada (words), La - Laya (rhythm) and Vi - Vinyasam (variations). Pallavi is the equivalent of a refrain in Western music. The Pallavi is usually a one-line composition set to a single or more cycle(s) of a tala. The tala could range from the simple to the complex and there may also be different gatis being employed.

Pallavi has two portions to it. The first half of Pallavi is an ascending piece of notes (Purvangam) and the first half of the Pallavi mostly ends at the stroke of the beginning of the second half of the Thalam cycle or in the beginning of the shortest part of the Thalam, called the Arudhi. Arudhi is the point of division of the two parts of a Pallavi. Between the first half of the Pallavi and the second half of the Pallavi there will be a brief pause called as the Vishranthi or resting time, which is an extension of the last syllable of the Purvangam and then the second portion of the Pallavi (Uttarangam) starts.

Executing niraval for a pallavi is unique, as, unlike in a kriti, the artist is not allowed to change the locations of each syllable in the sahityam, as this lessens the innate beauty of the pallavi.

The basic style in Pallavi rendition is to sing the Pallavi in different speeds and Nadai. In most cases the Pallavi is set to Chatushtra Nadai meaning each beat carries four matras (units). So the singer will then sing the Pallavi in three different speeds, once with each Beat carrying two units (Vilomam), then four units and then eight units per beat (Anulomam). They can also alter the speed of the Tala (Pratilomam) and keep the speed of the Sahityam constant. Once this is completed then they would sing the Pallavi in different Nadais (Mostly Tisra Nadai meaning each beat now carries three units) i.e. keeping the words and the length of the pallavi constant but changing the nadai of the thalam. All this can be done from the start of the pallavi or from the Arudhi. Some singers do this presentation before Swaraprastharam (Most common practice). Others alter the speed and Nadai during singing Swaras and then sing the Pallavi such that the position of Arudhi remains constant.

Once these aspects are covered, the singer explores in the Kalpanaswara phase and they would start exploring different Ragas during the Kalpanaswara.

The Pallavi challenges the musician's ability to improvise with complex and intricate patterns. The whole exercise is very demanding, both technically and musically, since all the artiste's musicianship is put to test.

== Contemporary Ragam Tanam Pallavi ==
Today, most concerts by prominent carnatic vocalists include a Ragam Tanam Pallavi (RTP). RTPs can be performed in any raga. Both popular as well as rare ragas can be used to perform a RTP. RTPs in rare ragas are common because the vocalist can present the pallavi with self-composed lyrics and hence need not search for or compose a kriti in the rare raga. In other words, artists often use the RTP portion of the concert to introduce their audience to ragams that are rarely sung. Many artists announce the name of the ragam before the pallavi portion.

=== Innovations ===
==== Introducing the name of the Ragam in the Pallavi sahityam ====
In the recent time pallavis, the artist includes the name of the ragam in the words used in the Pallavi. This helps the less-knowledgeable audience to identify the ragam (if the name of the ragam is not already announced) and also appeals to the audience as well as critics.

- 'Vandadum Solaiyile Malayamarutham Veesuthe' (set to Raga Malayamarutham) presented by Sanjay Subrahmanyan
- 'Sruthi laya bhaava sangeetham adhai en vasam thaa, bhairavi paavani' (set to Ragas Vasantha, Bhairavi and Vasanthabhairavi) presented by T.N.Seshagopalan
- 'Brindavana Sarangan Bhoolokavaikunthan Srirangan' (set to Raga Brindavana Saranga) presented by T.N.Seshagopalan.

==== Presentation of Pallavis using a Talam in two or more nadais within a cycle ====
Most pallavis are presented in a talam in a single nadai. But dwi-nadai (2 nadais), tri-nadai (3 nadais)and pancha-nadai (5 nadais) pallavis are also presented by experienced and seasoned artists. The use of such Talams is under debate and the views of artists vary.

- 'Dhananjaya Sarathey Dayanidhe Kripanidhe Rakshamam' (set to Raga Bahudari) presented by Ranjani Gayatri - Khanda jathi Triputa talam with Laghu in Tisra Nadai and Dhrutams in Chatusra Nadai
- 'Raajamatangi Lathangi Maampahi Matangi' (set to Raga Lathangi) presented by M.L.Vasanthakumari - Chatusra jathi Jhampa talam with Laghu in Tisra Nadai and Anudrutham and Dhrutam in Khanda Nadai.
- Raga Kalyani Pallavi presented by Pantula Rama - Khanda jathi Ata talam with first Laghu in Chatusra Nadai, second Laghu in Tisra Nadai and Dhrutams in Khanda Nadai.
- A Pancha Nadai Pallavi presented by Sudha Raghunathan - Khanda jathi Eka Talam with first akshara in Tisra nadai, second in Chatusra nadai, third in Khanda nadai, fourth in Misra nadai and fifth in Sankeerna nadai

==== Pallavis in many Ragams ====
It has been time noticed from time immemorial, that multiple ragam pallavis are being used in the concert circle. In this, the artist keeps on shifting between all the ragas in the whole presentation. They can be dwi-2, tri-3 or chatur-4 raga pallavis. Some pallavis have been cited as examples for all these forms.

===== Dwi-raga pallavis: =====
The below examples are all presented by Ranjani Gayatri.

- 'Sharavanabhava Guhane Shanmugane Ennai Ka Nataraja Mainda' (set to Ragas Kannada (Purvangam)and Kaanada (Uttarangam))
- 'Mohana Kannanai Pani Maname Ranjakamai Kuzhaloodum' (set to Ragas Mohanam (Poorvangam) and Ranjani (Uttarangam))
- 'Arabhimanam vaittu adarippar ennai Anandabhairavi' (set to Ragas Arabhi (Poorvangam) and Anandabhairavi (Uttarangam))

Other examples of Dwi-raga pallavis are Amrithavarshini/ Anandabhairavi by M.Balamuralikrishna, Saranga/ Nayaki by Ranjani Gayatri, Bhairavi/Sindhu Bhairavi by T.N.Seshagopalan and Mohanam/Kalyanavasantham by Bombay Jayashri.

===== Tri-raga pallavis: =====
Some Tri-raga pallavis are:

- 'Saraswathi Veena Pustaka Dharini Hari Vakshasthalaye Lalithe Maate Kanakadurge' in Ragas Saraswati, Lalitha and Durga by Ranjani Gayatri
- 'Chiranda engal Nattai kurinji enbar' in Ragas Nattai, Kurinji and Nattaikurinji by T.N.Seshagopalan

===== Chatur-raga pallavis: =====
Some Chatur-raga pallavis are:

- 'Shankarabharananai Azhaithodi vaadi Kalyani Darbarukku' in Ragas Dheerashankarabharanam, Hanumatodi, Mechakalyani and Darbar - written by Kunrakudi Krishnaiyyar, popularized by Ariyakudi Ramanuja Iyengar. Sung by many artists like T.M.Krishna, Sikkil Gurucharan etc.
- 'Saveri Balakanai, Mohana kumaranai Azhaitodiva Kalyani' in Ragas Saveri, Mohanam, Hanumatodi and Mechakalyani. by Maharajapuram Ramachandran
- 'Nityakalyani Shravani Katyayani Palayamam Chaturveda Swaroopini' in Ragas Mechakalyani, Valachi, Dhanyasi and Revathi by Ranjani Gayatri.

==== Talamalika in RTPs ====
Sometimes, artists change the tala of the RTP from the main tala to another that has same number of aksharas or a tala that has some number of aksharas, which when sung some integral number of times equals the number of aksharas in the main tala.

- Consider a pallavi set to Khanda jathi Thriputa talam Chatusra nadai. It has 36 aksharas. This Pallavi can be sung using Chatusra jathi Ata Talam Tisra nadai, which has the same number of Aksharas—36. This is an example of changing to a tala thath has the same number of aksharas.
- Consider the same pallavi set to Khanda jathi Thriputa talam Chatusra nadai. This pallavi can also be sung in Tisra jathi Jhampa talam Tisra nadai, which has 18 aksharas in a cycle. Hence the complete pallavi can be sung within two cycles of the talam i.e. 36 aksharas. This is an example of changing to a tala that when sung integral number of times gives the same number of aksharas as in the main tala.

Talamalika singing examples can be seen from the above citation (This is from a concert of Ranjani Gayatri).

==== Ragamala RTPs ====
This is a type of RTP where a Raga that has many Ragas with a similar name are sung in an RTP. Ragas with similar names like Group of Ranjani ragas, Bhairavi ragas, or Varali ragas can be used for presentation.

A good example is a recent rendition by Ranjani-Gayathri where they used the Pallavi phrase "Ranjani Kanchadala Lochani Brovavamma Thalli Niranjani"—their RTP was set to the ragam Ranjani. About 30 minutes into the RTP, when they started switching ragams, they switched to Sriranjani, Janaranjani, Megharanjani, Manoranjani, Sivaranjani and Sumanesha Ranjani. Since the audience are likely to be unfamiliar with some of these ragams, they changed their Pallavi phrase at the end of each of these 4-5 minute renderings- for instance, they finished Janaranjini rendition with "Ranjani Kanchadala Lochani Brovavamma Thalli Janaranjani". A musically literate audience often appreciate this approach, since this gives them 4–5 minutes to guess the ragam before the artist gives them the answer.
