= Narayana Ninna Namada =

Narayana Ninna Namada (Kannada: ನಾರಾಯಣಾ ನಿನ್ನ್ ನಾಮದ) is a Kannada composition in Carnatic music by Purandara Dasa in the 16th century. It is set in the Shuddha Dhanyasi raga and the Khanda Chapu tala. It emphasizes the value of reciting God's name.

The song is popular and has been performed by many musicians, including M. S. Subbulakshmi, Bombay Jayashri, Sudha Ragunathan, Maharajapuram Santhanam, M. Balamuralikrishna,E. Gayathri, Saindhavi and many others.

== Composition ==
Pallavi:

Nārāyaṇa ninna nāmada smaraṇeya
Sārāmṛtavu enna nāligege barali (Nārāyaṇa…)

Charanam 1:

Kaṣṭadallirali utkṛṣṭadallirali
Eṣṭādaru matigeṭṭu irali
Kṛṣṇa kṛṣṇa endu ṣiṣṭaru pēḷuva
Aṣhṭākṣara mahā-mantrada nāmava (Nārāyaṇa…)

Charanam 2:

Santata hari ninna sāsira nāmava
Antarangada oḷagirisi
Ento purandara viṭhala rāyana
Antya kāladalli chintisohānge (Nārāyaṇa…)
