= Vedavalli =

Indian singer (born 1935)

Kalaimamani R. Vedavalli
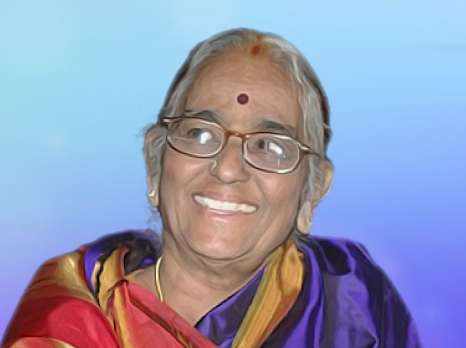
- R. Vedavalli
- Born: 9 November 1935 (age 90); Mannargudi, Madras Presidency, India
- Occupation: Indian classical vocalist
- Years active: 1953–present
- Spouse: D. R. Santhanam
- Parent(s): Ramaswami Iyengar (father); Padmasani Ammal (mother)
- Awards: Sangeet Natak Akademi Fellowship (2018); Sangita Kalanidhi (2000); Sangeetha Kalasikhamani (1995); Kalaimamani (1994)

Vidushi R. Vedavalli (born 9 November 1935) is an Indian Carnatic vocalist.. She was awarded the Madras Music Academy's Sangeetha Kalanidhi in 2000.

== Early life ==
R. Vedavalli was born in Mannargudi, Tamil Nadu, India to Ramaswami Iyengar and Padmasani Ammal.

== Career ==
R. Vedavalli's talent for music was identified early on by Madurai Srirangam Iyengar, who brought the five-year-old a harmonium, and got her started on vocal lessons. The family moved to Madras in a few years time, and Vedavalli came under the tutelage of Mudicondan Venkatarama Iyer.

She received a Central Government scholarship to specialize in Padams and Javalis with T.Muktha, and in Pallavis with Venkataramana Iyer. Though she has performed since childhood, it was Ariyakudi Ramanuja Iyengar who advised her to turn into a professional musician, when he heard her sing as an 18-year-old. She has travelled throughout India and abroad in North America, South-East Asia, the Far East and the Persian Gulf region, giving concerts and lecture demonstrations.

Vedavalli served in the Teacher's College of Music of the Madras Music Academy for several years before becoming Professor of Vocal Music in the Government College of Music Adyar. There she shared her knowledge and extensive repertoire with numerous students, in addition to training some students privately.

She is also trained in playing the veena, and has a good command over Tamil, Sanskrit, Kannada, Telugu, which helps her sing with greater understanding or artha bhava (meaning and emotion). She lived in Chennai with her husband D. R. Santhanam and mother Padmasani Ammal, at the turn of the century. Later she and her husband moved to Pune to be with their daughter, and D R Santhanam died in Pune in July 2021.

== Awards and recognitions ==
- From a very young age, Vedavalli won several awards in prestigious competitions including All India Radio's first prize for Classical Music and Light Classical Music, awarded by the President of India.
- 1994: Received title of Kalaimamani Award by the Government of Tamil Nadu, which is the highest state honour in the field of Arts.
- 1995: Received the Sangeetha Kalasikhamani award given by the Fine Arts Society, Chennai.
- 2000: Received the Sangeetha Kalanidhi, which is considered the highest award in Carnatic music.

== Disciples ==
Among her disciples today are accomplished performers, researchers, teachers and writers. Sumitra Vasudev and her daughter Sushruti Santhanam are her disciples. Sushruti is based in Pune and teaches music there.
