= Pantula Rama =

Indian singer, instrumentalist, and author

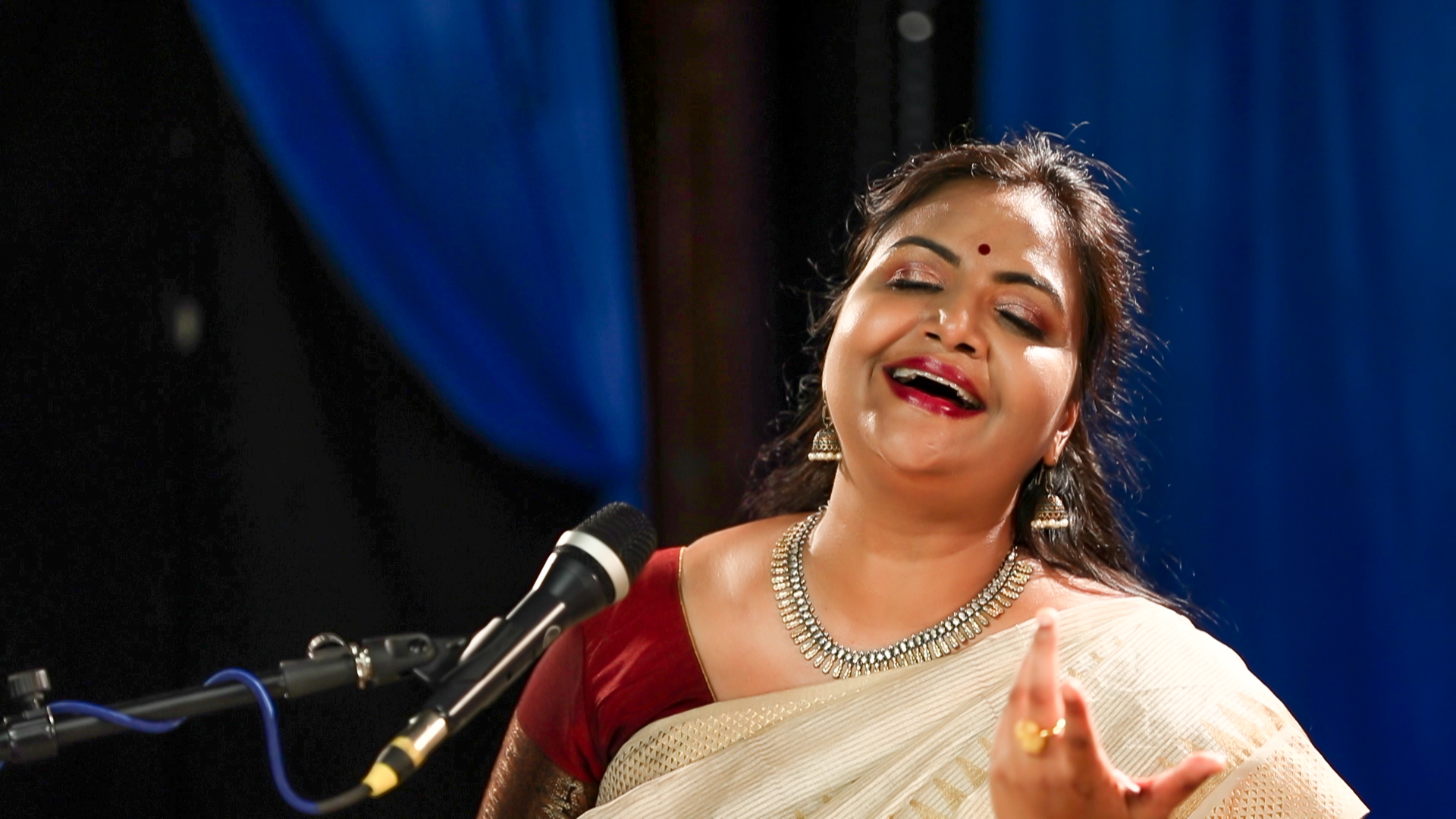

Background information
- Genre: Carnatic Music
- Occupation: Singer
- Instruments: Violin, Viola
- Years active: 1980–present
- Label: Charsur Digital Station
- Website: www.pantularama.me

Pantula Rama is an Indian singer, instrumentalist, and author who performs Carnatic music. She has been performing since the age of 8. Known as Andhra's Nightingale and Golden Voice, Pantula Rama lives in Vishakhapatnam and is married to violinist MSN Murthy.

== Early life and education ==
Pantula Rama was born to parents who are musicians. Her father is a violinist, and her mother is a Veena player. Her father was her first music teacher. After finishing school, Rama obtained a seat in MBBS. Eventually, she earned Bachelor of Arts and Master of Arts degrees in music from Andhra University. Her Ph.D. thesis at the same university was titled "A study of the shaping of an ideal musician through saadhana", and was published by Gyan Publishers.

== Career ==
Rama has performed at various concerts and festivals.

- She performed at a concert in January 2009. V. Subrahamaniam wrote: "Exquisite music taste was on display in Rama’s raga alapana. Her imagination and manodharana gushed out as though the gates of a reservoir had been opened up, each sanchara revealing chaste Kalyani."
- In 2011, she performed at Thyagaraya Ganasabha. Gudipoodi Srihari wrote: "She displayed an assertive voice and command of musical grammar."
- She performed at a concert in Chennai with her husband, MSN Murthy, and others. The Hindu wrote: "It requires immense skill, technical capacity, creative faculty of a high order, and detailed knowledge of the lakshanas of ragas to effortlessly elucidate them."
- She performed at the tenth edition of the Indira Sivasailam concert in October 2019. The Hindu wrote: "In this special concert, her complex and scholarly ragam-tanam-pallavi in Kalyani was the piece de résistance. It was composed to an intricate rhythm, which was, indeed, Pantula Rama’s forte."

In 2017, Rama started an initiative called PaRa to raise awareness of Carnatic music. PaRa means the supreme consciousness. Through this initiative, she collaborated with other artists to organize events.

== Reception ==
Aruna Chandaraju wrote: "The appeal of Dr Pantula Rama’s kutcheries is that the music is of a very high order. Her performances and work are known for chaste classicism, serenity, sobriety and technical perfection. Widely recognised as an outstanding vocalist of Carnatic music. Rama’s very melodious voice, effortless elucidation of ragas, her bhava-soaked rendition, technical skills, and immensely creative manodharma, taken along with a wide repertoire, endear her to rasikas."

G Swaminathan reported: "Pantula Rama’s concerts always carry a gentle tone of authority coupled with melody."

Venkatesan Srikanth wrote: "Rama strikes a perfect balance in her knowledge of theory and aesthetic in practice of music."

== Awards ==
- Best Musician, State Award from Government of Andhra Pradesh, 1996–97
- MS Subbulakshmi Award– conferred by Visakha Music Academy, 2010
- Outstanding Vocalist Award– conferred by XS Real organization, 2011
- Devi Women's Award for Dynamism and Innovation– conferred by New Indian Express, 2015
- Senior Vocal Outstanding Pallavi Award, Outstanding Lady Vocalist– conferred by Madras Music Academy, 2006, 2008, 2012, 2018
- Indira Sivasailam Endowment Medal– Indira Sivasailam Foundation in collaboration with the Madras Music Academy, 2019
- Ragam Tanam Pallavi award from Cleveland Thyagaraja Festival
