= Geetam =

Form in Carnatic music

Geetam, (Sanskrit: गीतम्; gītaṃ) the simplest music form in Carnatic music, was created by Purandara Dasa in order to introduce talas with sāhityaṃ (lyrics).

Gītaṃ literally means "song" in Sanskrit.

== Structure ==
A gītaṃ is a simple devotional melody song with same tempo throughout the song. There is no "anga" change, repetition and Sangati in gītaṃ. Gītaṃs usually have 10/12 avarthanams.

Though gītaṃs have no absolutely defined divisions of pallavi, anupallavi or charanas, they may be observed in some cases. Some gītaṃs contain sections rather than the defined divisions (pallavi etc.). They often have no sangatis or variations, with each swara taking one syllable of the sahitya. The gītaṃ is sung without repetition from the beginning to end. However most gītaṃs are concluded by repeating a portion of the opening part. Gītaṃs are set in medium tempo and contain no saṃgatis or variations and the flow of the music is natural. The theme of the sāhityaṃ (lyrics) is to praise God. Students learn these gītaṃs after attaining a course in the preliminary saraḷī svarās and alaṃkārās.

== Types of gītaṃs ==
There are three types of gītaṃs in Carnatic music tradition:

- Sāmānya gītaṃ: the simple song and it is also called sādhāraṇa gītaṃ or sancāri gītaṃ.
- Lakshaṇa gītaṃ: the sāhityaṃ (lyrics), instead of praising God, enumerates in so many words, the lakshana of the raga, in which it is composed-giving among other details, its vakra svarā, graha, nysa, aṃśa svarā and its parent raga (mēḷakarta rāga). Most lakshaṇa gītaṃs have been composed by Purandara Dasa.
- Suladi gītaṃ:

== Classification of gitams ==
- Pillari Gitams : These are the gitams in praise of Lord Ganesha.
- Sanchari Gitams : These are the ones in praise of other gods like Shiva or Vishnu

== Some well known gītaṃs ==
1. Vara Vīṇā Mr̥dupāṇi (Sanskrit) in Mohanam Raga (Janya of 28th Mela Harikambhoji) - Rupaka Tala
2. Śrī Gaṇanātha (Laṃbōdara) (Sanskrit) in Malahari Rāga (Janya of 15th Mela Mayamalavagowla) - Chathushruti Jati Rupaka Tala
3. Analekara in Shuddha Saveri Raga (Janya of 29th Mela Sankarabharanam) - Tisra Jati Triputa Tala
4. Kamala Jaḍala (Telugu) in Kalyani Rāga 65th Mēḷakarta Rāga)- Tisra Jati Triputa Tala
