= Chitta swara =

Concept in Indian classical music

In Indian classical music, chitte swara (Sanskrit: चिट्टे स्वर, Kannada: ಚಿಟ್ಟೆ ಸ್ವರ) are a set of solfa passages (phrases of swaras). These are sung after the anupallavi and charanam, in the krithis which enriches the beauty of the composition. Chitte in Kannada means butterfly. The swaras enhance the beauty of the song like butterflies. This is usually done by the performers and not by the composers and in Carnatic music is an important improvisation aspect (manodharma music).
