= Tillana =

Rhythmic piece in Carnatic music

A Tillana or thillana is a rhythmic piece in South Indian carnatic music that is generally performed at the end of a concert and widely used in classical Indian dance performances. It was popularised by M Balamuralikrishna, Lalgudi Jayaraman and some other musicians A Tillana uses tala-like phrases in the pallavi and anupallavi, and lyrics in the charanam.

The thillana is based on the tarana which was introduced by Amir Khusrau (1253-1325 CE).
