= Viruttam =

A viruttam or virutham (Tamil) is a Hindu devotional verse sung in Carnatic music concerts. Viruttams do not possess a set tala and are solely improvised using one or more ragams. It is one of many forms of manodharma (spontaneous improvisations) in Carnatic music.

A viruttam usually precedes rendition of a song. In most cases, it is sung in the same ragam as the song that follows it. Occasionally, viruttam of multiple verses are sung in different ragams, followed by a song in the same ragam as the last sung ragam of the viruttam.

The artist may also sing the same verse in different ragams in different concerts.

Virutham is not only used in concerts but also in traditional celebrations. Viruthams in praise of Lord Ayyappa are famous in South India. Viruthams are also sung in praise of Lord Muruga.

A viruttam is called as Ugabhoga in Kannada. Ugabhogas are few set of devotional lines by the Haridasas of Karnataka. Ugabhogas are more often sung in Carnatic concerts before a Devaranama. Ugabhogas contain the mudra of the Haridasa
