= Konerirajapuram Vaidyanatha Ayyar =

Indian Carnatic vocalist

Konerirajapuram Vaidyanatha Ayyar (1878–1921) was a Carnatic vocalist from what is now the Indian state of Tamil Nadu.

== Early life ==
Vaidyanatha Ayyar was born in 1878 to Narayana Ayyar and Sitalakshmi in the Vathima village of Konerirajapuram in a Vadama Iyer family. He had his early training under Nagaswaram Palanivelu, Marudhanallur Kulandaisami, Chinna Kulandaisami, Melattur Sundara Bhagavathar and Venkatarama Bhagavathar. His disciple Papanasam Sivan was awarded Sangeet Kalanidhi title in 1971. Mudicondan Venkatarama Iyer, also a Sangeet Kalanidhi recipient, was also his student.

He was married at the age of twelve. Just when he himself and his peers felt that his music had reached a rare maturity, he died at the young age of 43.

His namesake Maha Vaidyanatha Iyer was also a Carnatic vocalist from the 19th century. In 1910s, Konerirajapuram Vaidyanath Iyer and his fellow short-lived contemporary Madurai Pushpavanam Iyer had become two cult figures in Carnatic music with a huge following.
