= Anandabhairavi =

Rhythm that maintains a happy beat throughout the song

- Arohanam: S G₂ R₂ G₂ M₁ P D₂ P Ṡ
- Avarohanam: Ṡ N₂ D₂ P M₁ G₂ R₂ S

Anandabhairavi or Ananda Bhairavi (pronounced ānandabhairavi) is a very old melodious ragam (musical scale) of Carnatic music (South Indian classical music). This rāgam also used in Indian traditional and regional musics. Ānandam (Sanskrit) means happiness and the rāgam brings a happy mood to the listener.

It is a janya rāgam (derived scale) of the 22th Melakarta rāgam karaharapriya.

Parent scale Natabhairavi with shadjam at C

Its ārohaṇa-avarohaṇa structure is as follows (see swaras in Carnatic music for details on the notations used):

- ārohaṇa : S G₂ R₂ G₂ M₁ P D₂ P Ṡ (Note: Alternate notations: Hindustani: S G̱ R G̱ M P D P Ṡ; Western: C E♭ D E♭ F G A G C)
- avarohaṇa : Ṡ N₂ D₂ P M₁ G₂ R₂ S (Note: Alternate notations: Hindustani: Ṡ Ṉ D P M G̱ R S; Western: C B♭ A G F E♭ D C)

Arohanam Avarohanam for Ananda Bhairavi

(chathusruthi rishabham, sadharana gandharam, shuddha madhyamam, Chatusruthi dhaivatham, kaishiki nishadham)

It is a sampoorna rāgam – rāgam having all 7 swarams, but it is not a melakarta rāgam, as it has vakra prayogam (zig-zag notes in scale) and uses anya swaram (external note) in comparison with its parent rāgam. The anya swaram is the usage of shuddha dhaivatham (D1) in some phrases of the rāgam. Anandabhairavi ragam is also a bhashanga rāgam, since it uses more than one anya swaram. Anya swaram of a rāgam is the swaram which does not belong to the arohana or avarohana of its melakarta (parent rāgam), but it is sung in prayogams (phrases used in raga alapana, kalpanaswarams). It is also classified as a "rakti" raga(a raga of high melodic content).

== Swara phrases ==
The three anya swarams of Anandabhairavi are antara gandharam (G3), suddha dhaivatam (D1) and kakali nishadham (N3). All of these anya swaras occur only in prayogas (not in arohana avarohana). "G3" occurs in "ma pa ma ga ga ma", and "D1" occurs in "ga ma pa da". Subtler than the first two, "N3" occurs in "sa da ni sa."

Anandabhairavi also has unique swara patterns both in manodharma (impromptu improvisations by performer) and in its compositions. The popular patterns are "sa ga ga ma", "sa pa", and "sa ga ma pa". The musician is not allowed to stay long on nishadam, this characteristic distinguishes it from Reetigowla. Few allied ragas (similar) to this are Reetigowla and Huseni.

== Popular compositions ==
Anandabhairavi is one of the favourite ragams of Syama Sastri. He is said to have made this a popular rāgam and also to have given the present form for this rāgam. More or less Anandabhairavi's synonym is "Marivere gati" by Syama Sastri. In "Mariverae" and in "O Jagadhamba" Syama Sastri uses the anya swara "ga(2)".

Musicologist N. Mammathu identifies the song Yaadhum Oore from the album Sandham: Symphony Meets Classical Tamil by composer Raleigh Rajan as a defining illustration of Anandabhairavi, because it explores a wide range of phrases, rules, and exceptions characteristic of the ragam.

A life-changing incident is said to have happened in Tyagaraja's life. He is said to have attended a Kuchipudi Bhagavata artists dance-drama recital, a ballad between mythological characters Radha and Krishna, and he praised their performance, especially a particular song Madhura Nagarilo (Javali), which was set in Ananda Bhairavi. Tyagaraja, wanting to acknowledge them, offered to give them a gift of anything that they may desire, that he could possibly give. After much thought they demanded the Ananda Bhairavi itself as a gift (meaning that he would accept to never sing in that ragam ever again in his life), so that when someone in the near future spoke of Tyagaraja or Ananda Bhairavi's legacy they would also remember the Kuchipudi dancers.

== See also ==
- List of film songs based on ragas
