= Tanam =

Carnatic classical music method

Tanam or Taanam (pronounced tānam) is one of the methods of raga improvisation (manodharma) in the Carnatic classical music tradition, suited mainly for vocal, violin and veena.

Tanam consists of expanding the raga with syllables "a-nam-tam". The origin of this usage is not very clear. It could have originated from the Sanskrit word "tanyate" (that which is elaborated) or "tena" indicative of an auspicious object. Tanam is rendered as a rhythmic variation of raga alapana, in chaturasra nadai, though there is no specific talam that is followed.

Tanam is almost always rendered without percussion accompaniment; the element of rhythm is embedded within the repetition of the syllables "a-nam-tham".

Tanam is the second part of a Raagam Taanam Pallavi, and comes immediately after the raga is sung but before the pallavi is about to begin. Among these three modes, tanam is rarely sung very elaborately when compared to raga and pallavi, the reason usually cited for this being that tanam singing requires a lot of physical stamina, sound knowledge of the fundamentals of classical music, good practice and experience.

In violin and veena solo concerts, however, tanam is almost always performed as part of the main piece.
