= Melattur Venkatarama Sastry =

Indian writer (1770–1830)

Melattur Venkatarama Sastry (1770–1830) was a Telugu poet and playwright who is credited with founding the Bhagavatha Melas.

== Early life ==
Venkatarama Sastry was born in 1770 in Melattur in the then Thanjavur Maratha kingdom. His mother tongue was Telugu and his ancestors had migrated in the 1550s after the fall of the Vijayanagara Empire. Sastry's father was Gopalakrishnayya. Venkatarama Sastry learnt music and dance from Lakshmanarya. Venkatarama Sastry was fluent in Sanskrit and was a great disciple of Narasimha. The most popular and the oldest known Swarajati, E Mayaladira in Huseni Raga in Telugu is composed by Melattur Venkatarama Sastry.

== Works ==
Some of Venkatarama Sastry's important works are

- Prahalada Charitra
- Rukmangada Charitra
- Markandeya Charitra
- Ushaparinayamu
- Harischandra
- Sitakalyanamu
