= Kalpanaswaram =

In Carnatic Music, Kalpanaswaram (also called swarakalpana (spelt alternatively as svarakalpana), manodharmaswara or simply swaras), is melo-rhythmic raga improvisation in a specific tala. As part of swarakalpana, the musician delivers increasingly complex, improvised sequences in the Indian music solfege (sa, ri, ga, ma, pa, da, ni) within or towards the end of a composition. Swarakalpana is integral to the Pallavi portion of a Ragam Thanam Pallavi and typically follows the neraval. It is also common for seasoned artists to perform swarakalpana during recitals of various other kritis.

== Facts ==
The kalpanaswaram may start at any place in the tala, but invariably the artist must end their improvisation at the first note of the first phrase of the composition, at the place in the rhythm cycle, where that note is. To arrive at that note, one has to approach it from the closest note below. There are, however, instances when kalpana swaras are rendered at various starting points of the composition which may not coincide with the start of the Tala cycle. In such cases, the kalapana swaras should always end at the same position irrespective of where they start. For example: 2 or 4 counts after the start of the Tala Cycle.

Kalpanaswaram improvisations increase in intensity with the tala cycles used. One complete tala cycle is called an avartanam. While improvising, the musician must abide by the rules of the raga and ensure that swaras used in the imaginative phrases are all-inclusive in the basic Aarohana (ascent) and Avarohana (descent) structure of the raga. Some ragas omit notes and others have zigzagging ascents or descents. The great musicians develop a vocabulary of phrases in kalpanaswaram as in an alapana, especially when doing kalpanaswaram at low speeds, which allow for more gamaka. The place where the first note of the first phrase of the composition exists in the rhythm cycle is called the eduppu.

Kalpanaswaram is performed in a Carnatic Concert for the main song, the singer chooses to perform the Raga Alapana. However, in concerts, artists often choose a difficult raga in which to perform Kalpanaswaram. Although there are no set rules, the artist may decide to expound the expressions of a particular raga in Kalpanaswaram as opposed to Alapana.

Take the Raga Sahana (janya of 28th Melakarta raga Harikambhoji):

- Arohanam : S R G M P M D N S
- Avarohanam : S N D P M G M R G R S

In this raga, when the artist improvises, when ascending in pitch after the Pa (Panchamam), the Ma (Madhyamam) needs to be sung, or the raga will be wrong. So with a raga like Sahana or Anandabhairavi, Purvi Kalyani, etc., which have Dhattu (jumping) swarams in their arohanam and/or avarohanam the Kalpanaswaram is harder to master and perform.
