= Niraval =

In Carnatic music, Neraval also known as Niraval or Sahitya Vinyasa is the elaboration and improvisation of melody for a particular line. Usually, just one or two lines of text from the song (from the anupallavi or charanam part of the kriti) are sung repeatedly, but with improvised elaborations. The part of lyrics is chosen which is self-contained in terms of its meaning and context and has an elegant structure amenable for repetition with variations. In general, such elaborations follow the rhythmic patterns in the original lyrics (talam), and each word in the lines of text stay set within their original place (idam) in the tala cycle, though minor variations that remain faithful to the syllabic patterns of the sahityam are considered fine. The lines are then also played at different levels of speed which can include double speed, triple speed, quadruple speed and even sextuple speed. The neraval is one of the features in the extempore improvisation aspect (Manodharma Sangita) of Carnatic music, and is intended to highlight the Raga bhava effectively. It is usually performed by the more advanced performers.

== Examples ==
Examples of Krithis containing lines best suited for neraval:

- Vathapi Ganapathim in Hamsadhwani at "Pranava Swarupa Vakratundam"
- Balagopala in Bhairavi at "Neela neeradha shareera dheerathara",
- Entara Nithana in Harikambhoji at "Sheshudu Shivuniki Bushudu Lakshmana",
- Nidhichaala Sukhama in Kalyani (raga) at "Mamathabandhanayutha Narasthuthi Sukhama?" or "Sumathi Thyagaraja Keerthana Sukhama?"
- O Rangasayee in Kambhoji at "Bhuloka Vaikuntam ithiyani",
- Ennaganu Ramabhajana in Kamavardhini at "Rama Chiluka Nokata Penchi Prema Matalalada Nerpi",
- Raghuvara Nannu in Kamavardhini at "Manasuna Niki"
- Pakkala Nilabadi in Kharaharapriya at " Tanuvurce vandana mona ninchuchu nara" or "Manasuna"
- Palinchu Kamakshi in Madhyamavati at "Kanthamagu Peru Pondhithivi Kaarunyamurthivai jagamu",
- Rama Rama Gunaseema in Simhendramadhyamam at "Munimaanasa dhama Mrughamatha Sulalama",
- Rama nee Samanamevaru in Kharaharapriya at "Paluku palukulaku tene"
- Saroja Dhala Netri in Sankarabharanam at "Sama Gana Vinodhini gunadhama Shyamakrishnanuthe",
- Shambho Mahadeva in Kamavardhini at "Shambho Mahadeva Sharanagathajana rakshaka",
- Jagadoddharana in Kapi at "Purandara Vithalana"
- Narayana Ninna Namada in Shuddha Dhanyasi at "Ento Purandaravithalarayana"
- Sri Venkateshwara in Thodi at "Maarajanakam Madhavanamakam",

== See also ==
- Glossary of Carnatic music
