= Nattakurinji =

Janya raga of Carnatic music

- Mela: 28th Mela Harikambhoji
- Chakra: Bana
- Type: Vakra
- Arohanam: S R₂ G₃ M₁ N₂ D₂ N₂ P D₂ N₂ Ṡ
- Avarohanam: Ṡ N₂ D₂ M₁ G₃ M₁ P G₃ R₂ S
- Similar: Ravi Chandrika of Carnatic

Nattakurinji is a raga (musical scale) in Carnatic music. It is a audava janya raga of the 28th Melakarta raga Harikambhoji. This raga is considered auspicious to sing in the evenings. Though rarely used in Hindustani music, it is very popular in Carnatic music. The raaga Kurinji belongs to the Melakarta family Shankarabharanam but is relatively rare.

== Structure and Lakshana ==
Nattakurinji is an asymmetric rāgam. It is described as having three types of ascending (arohana) and descending scales (avarohana). In practice, all 3 types of arohana and avarohana, as well as other usages (prayogas), are found. Its ārohaṇa-avarohaṇa structure (one ascending and descending scale) is as follows:

- ārohaṇa : S R₂ G₃ M₁ N₂ D₂ N₂ P D₂ N₂ Ṡ (Note: Alternate notations: Hindustani: S R G M Ṉ D Ṉ P D Ṉ Ṡ; Western: C D E F B♭ A B♭ G A B♭ C)
- avarohaṇa : Ṡ N₂ D₂ M₁ G₃ R₂ S (Note: Alternate notations: Hindustani: Ṡ Ṉ D M G R S; Western: C B♭ A F E D C)

The notes used in this scale are shadjam, chathusruthi rishabham, antara gandhara, chathusruthi dhaivatham and kaisiki nishadham in the ascending scale, with rishabham excluded in the descending scale. For details of the notations and terms, see swaras in Carnatic music. It is also classified as a "rakti" raga (a raga of high melodic content).

== Popular compositions ==
The song Kannamoochi yenada in the movie Kandukondain Kandukondain is not entirely composed in this ragam; only the initial portion of the song is composed in Nattakurinj, while the latter half is composed in Sahana.
