= Ranjani =

Janya raga of Carnatic music

- Arohanam: S R₂ G₂ M₂ D₂ Ṡ
- Avarohanam: Ṡ N₃ D₂ M₂ G₂ S

Ranjani is a Carnatic raga, which is also sometimes written as Ranjini. This raga is a janya of the 59th Melakarta raga Dharmavati.

It is an asymmetric pentatonic scale, which is pleasing and has been more popular in last 50 years. It figures in ragamalikas, slokams, vrittams and light popular songs, as it is a pleasing scale.

Ascending scale with C as Shadjam (tonic note)

== Structure and Lakshana ==
Descending scale has N3 in place of R2

This ragam is an asymmetric scale and is classified as an audava-audava ragam (five notes in the ascending and descending scale).

- ārohaṇa: S R₂ G₂ M₂ D₂ Ṡ (Note: Alternate notations: Hindustani: S R G̱ M̄ D Ṡ; Western: C D E♭ F♯ A C)
- avarohaṇa: Ṡ N₃ D₂ M₂ G₂ S (Note: Alternate notations: Hindustani: Ṡ N D M̄ G̱ S; Western: C B A F♯ E♭ C)

The notes in this scale are chathushruthi rishabham, sadharana gandharam, prati madhyamam, chathusruthi dhaivatam in arohana and additional kakli nishadham in avarohanam, in place of sadharna rishabham (see pictures). From Dharmavati scale (59th melakarta), the panchamam is removed in this scale and the rest are used in asymmetrical manner which gives the pleasing aspect to this ragam.

S R2 G2 S, S N3. D2. S - is a catch phrase that is unique to ragam Ranjani (where N3. and D2. denotes lower octave).

== See also ==
There are many ragams that end with Ranjani.

- Mararanjani (melakarta)
- Manoranjani
- Shree ranjani
- Shivaranjani
- List of Janya Ragas
