= Ugabhoga =

Vocal piece in Karnatic music

The term ugabhoga refers to a type of vocal piece in Karnatic music, in which the artist elaborates the treatment of raga characteristics through freestyle verses (typically in the Kannada language) with or without tala.
