= Varnam =

Form of song in Carnatic music

Varṇam is a type of composition in the Carnatic music system that encapsulates the key features of a raga, and considered as a foundational element in the learning path. Varnams capture the essence of the ragam in terms of typical swara patterns used, vishesha prayogas, highlighting the main notes (jeeva swaras), etc. This forms the basis for creative presentation (manodharma) of the raga in the form of raga aalapana, kalpana swarams and neraval.

Varnams are a fundamental form in Carnatic music. All varnams consist of lyrics, as well as swara passages, including a pallavi, an anupallavi, muktaayi swaras, a charanam, and chitta swaras. There are different types of varnams, such as taana varnam, pada varnam, daru varnam and ragamalika varnam. They also come in different taalams (beat cycles). Though the most popular varnams are in Aadi and Ata taalas, there are a number of varnams in other talas as well (e.g., jampa tala, triputa tala, matya talam, roopaka talam, etc).

A varnam is traditionally performed as an opening item by musicians in Carnatic music concerts or as a centre main piece in Bharatanatyam dance concerts. As a foundation to Carnatic music, varnams are also practised as vocal exercises by performers of Carnatic music, to help develop voice culture, and maintain proper pitch and control of rhythm. The melodic patterns in a varnam are considered to be characteristic patterns of a particular raga.

tanam-like rhythmic qualities, tana varnams only have lyrics for the pallavi, anupallavi and charanam.

With rhythmic elements like a padam, pada varnams are generally sung to accompany South Indian classical dance, including bharatanatyam. Unlike the tana varnam which only has lyrics for the pallavi, anupallavi and charanam and swaras for the rest of the sections, a pada varnam also has lyrics that correspond to the muktaayi and chitta swaras of the varnam, so generally, pada varnams contain more lyrical content than a tana varnam. The swaras in this type of varnam are suitable for intricate footwork. Padajathi varnams are simply pada varnams that also contain jatis, making them again more suitable for South Indian classical dance.

== Contents of a varnam ==
The name varnam (meaning 'letter') was likely given to this form of song due to the prevalence of swara letters in this type of composition.

Lyrical content of varnams are commonly either devotional or amorous.

The varnam consists of two parts: poorvadham (first half) - consisting of pallavi, anupallavi and muktaayi swaram and uttarardham (second half) - consisting of charanam and charana swarams. Some of the older compositions have a part called "Anubandham" following this.

- Pallavi: The first section of the Varnam, sung with lyrics (sahitya).
- Anupallavi: Second section, also sung with lyrics (sahitya).
- Muktaayi Swaram (also called Chitta Swaram): Sung completely with notes. In Pada Varnams, corresponding lyrics are present, which will be sung after the notes are sung.
- Charanam or Eththugada Pallavi: Sung with lyrics
- Chitta Swaram or Eththugadda Swaram: Sung with notes. In a Pada varnam, there are lyrics which correspond to the Charanam swaras. The swaras occur in several groups or stanzas.
- Anubandham: epilogue to the Varnam. Some varnams have an additional part that is sung with lyrics (sahitya), and leading back to the muktaayi (chitta) swara or the first pallavi line itself. It is found more often with very old varnams and it is less prevalent in the newer varnams. In modern times, performers rarely sing the anubandham (ie., the rendering is concluded after charana swarams, leading back to the charanam).

Varnams are traditionally rendered in a format that consists of pallavi, anupallavi and chitta swaram (mukthayi swaram) being sung first in a relatively slow pace and repeated immediately after in double the speed. The rest of the composition (charanam onwards) is sung in a madhyama kala or approximately 1.5 times the speed used at the start. Each swara passage is sung, followed by the lyrics of the charanam. Some performers do not follow this, though, preferring to sing the entire composition in madhyama kala or relatively fast pace.

Varnams are generally sung in two varieties of talas, or meter systems: adi tala (eight-beat cycle) and ata tala (fourteen-beat cycle), where ata tala varnams are generally more complicated and advanced. In most of the adi tala varnams, the tala is placed in the two-kalai version; therefore, each beat and finger count is placed twice.

== Famous varnams ==
Adi Tala varnams include:

- "Sami Ninne" in Shree ragam composed by Karur Devudu Iyer in Telugu
- "Ninnukori" in Mohanam ragam by Poochi Srinivasa Iyengar in Telugu
- "Evvari Bodhana" in Abhogi ragam by Patnam Subramania Iyer in Telugu
- "Era Naapai" in Todi raagam by Patnam Subramania Iyer in Telugu

Ata Tala varnams include:

- "Viriboni" in Bhairavi ragam by Pacchimiriam Adiyappa in Telugu
- "Nera Nammiti" in Kaanada raagam by Poochi Srinivasa Iyengar in Telugu
- "Chalamela" in Sankarabharanam by Swati Tirunal in Telugu

The Arabhi ragam varnam is supposed to be the only longest piece with jantai and dhatu prayogas.

The "Mathe Malayadhwaja" by Harikesanalloor Muthiah Bhagavatar is a unique varnam because the chitta swara has two different types of saahitya arranged according to it. The first is a rhythmic poetry describing the king and has the Raaja mudra and the second is a lilting Solkattu swara which is embodied in expression by bharatanatyam dancers.

== See also ==
- Navaragamalika

== Notes ==
- Tenzer, Michael (2006). Analytical Studies in World Music. New York: Oxford University Press.
- Panchapakesa Iyer, A. S. (1989). Karnataka sangeeta sastra: theory of Carnatic music. Ganamrutha Prachuram.
