= Alapana =

Form of improvisation in Carnatic music

In Carnatic classical music, alapana is a form of manodharmam, or improvisation, that introduces and develops a raga (musical scale). It communicates the permitted notes and phrases of the raga, setting the mood for the composition that follows. As a term that is Sanskrit in language, alapana means "to speak, address, discourse, communicate". It is the first part of Ragam Tanam Pallavi (RTP), which showcases a Carnatic musician's ability to understand a raga and improvise music set to it.

== Overview ==
Alapana at the start of Kiravani Raaga

The flavor of the raga is outlined in the alapana by rendering the raga's permitted notes in structures and phrases unique to the raga (known as "raga lakshanam"). Alapana typically precedes a song that is going to be sung in the same raga. It demonstrates proper knowledge of the raga by highlighting key phrases common to it. Alapana is rendered in different speeds, with a gradual increase in tempo. Likewise, the complexity of the patterns increases steadily as the alapana progresses.

Alapana, also referred to as ragam, is the exposition of a raga or tone. It is a slow improvisation with no rhythm, where the raga acts as the basis of embellishment. In performing alapana, performers consider each raga as an object that has beginnings and endings and consists somehow of sequences of thought.

In a Carnatic concert, the alapana introducing a major composition may last 45 minutes or more, while those preceding other compositions are proportionately shorter. Performers and instrumental accompanists often render the alapana together and individually (for example, vocalist's phrases are shadowed by that of a violinist, and later the violinist may perform solo).

Raga Alapana is divided into three parts: akshipthika, ragavardhini, and magarini.

== Three Parts of Raga Alapana ==
=== Akshipthika ===
In Carnatic music, the Akshipthika is the first part or the introductory part of the alapana. It gives an idea about the raga (musical mode) in which the song is going to be sung. It is followed by the ragavardhini. Akshipthika is the introduction to the raga. It usually starts on a low note in the scale but then again the artist is permitted to start wherever they want on the scale and at whatever tempo they want. We must remember that the idea of raga alapana is to allow the musician to creatively express themselves and the raga without sticking to a particular scaffold as they must in a song. Thus, there is no particular order or manner in which it must be performed.

=== Ragavardhini ===
Ragavardhini is a major part of the alapana of a raga. The performer gives a step-by-step elaboration of the raga, pausing at each major note or swara.

=== Magarini ===
Magarini is the concluding section of the alapana. The artist sings brisks passages scaling across the entire range of raga.
