= Kriti (music) =

Carnatic musical composition

A kriti (Sanskrit: कृति, lit. 'kṛti') is a form of musical composition in the Carnatic music literature. The Sanskrit common noun Kriti means 'creation' or 'work'.

A kriti forms the mental backbone of any typical Carnatic music concert and is the longer format of a Carnatic song.

== Structure ==
A conventional kriti typically contain three parts:

1. Pallavi, the equivalent of a refrain in Western music
2. Anupallavi, the second verse, which is sometimes optional
3. Charanam, the final (and longest) verse that wraps up the song

The charanam usually borrows patterns from the anupallavi. The charanam's last line usually contains the composer's signature, or mudra, with which the composer leaves their mark.

== Variations ==
Some Kritis have a verse between the anupallavi and the charaṇam, called the chiṭṭaswara. This verse consists only of notes, and has no words. Other krithis, particularly some of Oothukkadu Venkata Kavi and Muthuswami Dikshitar's compositions, are intentionally composed without an annupallavi, where the verse after the pallavi is called the samashti charanam. Still others have some more sāhityā at the end of the charaṇam, set in madhyamakāla (few lines within a song that are sung faster than the rest of it).

There are krithi's, such as Thyagaraja's Enduku Nirdhaya that have no annupallavi but many short charanams. Often, the artists take up certain lines of a Krithi for neraval. One of the greatest explorers of the krti form was Oottukkadu Venkata Kavi (1700–1765), who has created numerous varieties within this form, often with innovations in contrasting speeds, gaits (gatis) and lyrical variation (sahitya-sangatis), sectional partitioning and singular blending of rhythmic syllables and lyrics.
