= Charanam =

Usually the end section of a composition in Carnatic music

Charanam (meaning foot) in Carnatic music (South Indian classical music) is usually the end section of a composition which is sung after the anupallavi.

There may be multiple charanams in a composition which make up different stanzas, but in compositions that do not have an anupallavi, there often exists a samrashti charanam that combines both the anupallavi and charanam of the composition which directly follows the pallavi.

The charana swaras are grouped in four different ways:

- 1st - one tala cycle.
- 2nd - one tala cycle.
- 3rd - two long tala cycles
- 4th - four long tala cycles
