= Anupallavi (music) =

Usually the second section of any composition in Carnatic music

In Carnatic music, the anupallavi comes after the pallavi and is usually the second section of any composition. It is then followed by one or more charanams. The anupallavi is optional. In compositions that do not have an anupallavi, there often exists a Samrashti Charanam that combines both the anupallavi and charanam of the composition which directly follows the pallavi. It is usually sung at a higher pitch and adds more beauty to the music. Usually the Anupallavi is shorter than the Charanam . In Sanskrit 'anu' means 'next'. It literally means 'next to pallavi'.
