= Pallavi =

Thematic line of a song in carnatic music

A pallavi is a refrain in carnatic music, commonly associated with South India. It is the first part of any formal composition (Krithi) which has three segments – Pallavi, Anupallavi and Charanam (which can be one or more). Pallavi is usually also an abbreviation of Ragam Thanam Pallavi. It is considered as the opening verse of Varnam.

== Other uses ==
Pallavi in Sanskrit is used as an adjective or a verb with appropriate suffix to denote a small and tender red-coloured leaf of a plant or a tendril.
