= Carnatic music =

Music genre originating in southern India

Carnatic music (known as Karnāṭaka saṃgīta or Karnāṭaka saṅgītam in the Dravidian languages) is a system of music commonly associated with South India, including the modern Indian states of Andhra Pradesh, Karnataka, Kerala, Tamil Nadu and Telangana. Most Carnatic compositions are in Telugu and Sanskrit languages. It is one of two main sub-genres of Indian classical music (the other being Hindustani music) that evolved from ancient Hindu texts and traditions; in particular, the Samaveda is cited as a key foundation. The main emphasis in Carnatic music is on vocal music; most compositions are written to be sung, and even when played on instruments, they are meant to be performed in gāyaki (singing) style.

Although there are stylistic differences, the basic elements of śruti (the relative musical pitch), svara (the musical sound of a single note), rāga (the mode or melodic formulae), and tala (the rhythmic cycles) form the foundation of improvisation and composition in both Carnatic and Hindustani music. Although improvisation plays an important role, Carnatic music is mainly sung through compositions, especially the kriti (or kirtanam) – a form developed between the 14th and 20th centuries by composers such as Purandara Dasa, and the Trinity of Carnatic music. Carnatic music is also usually taught and learned through compositions. Telugu language predominates in the evolution of Carnatic music.

Carnatic music is usually performed by a small ensemble of musicians, consisting of a principal performer (usually a vocalist), a melodic accompaniment (usually a violin), a rhythm accompaniment (usually a mridangam), and a tambura, which acts as a drone throughout the performance. Other typical instruments used in performances may include the ghatam, kanjira, morsing, venu flute, veena, and chitraveena. The greatest concentration of Carnatic musicians is to be found in the city of Chennai. Various Carnatic music festivals are held throughout India and abroad, including the Madras Music Season, which has been considered to be one of the world's largest cultural events.

== Origin and history ==
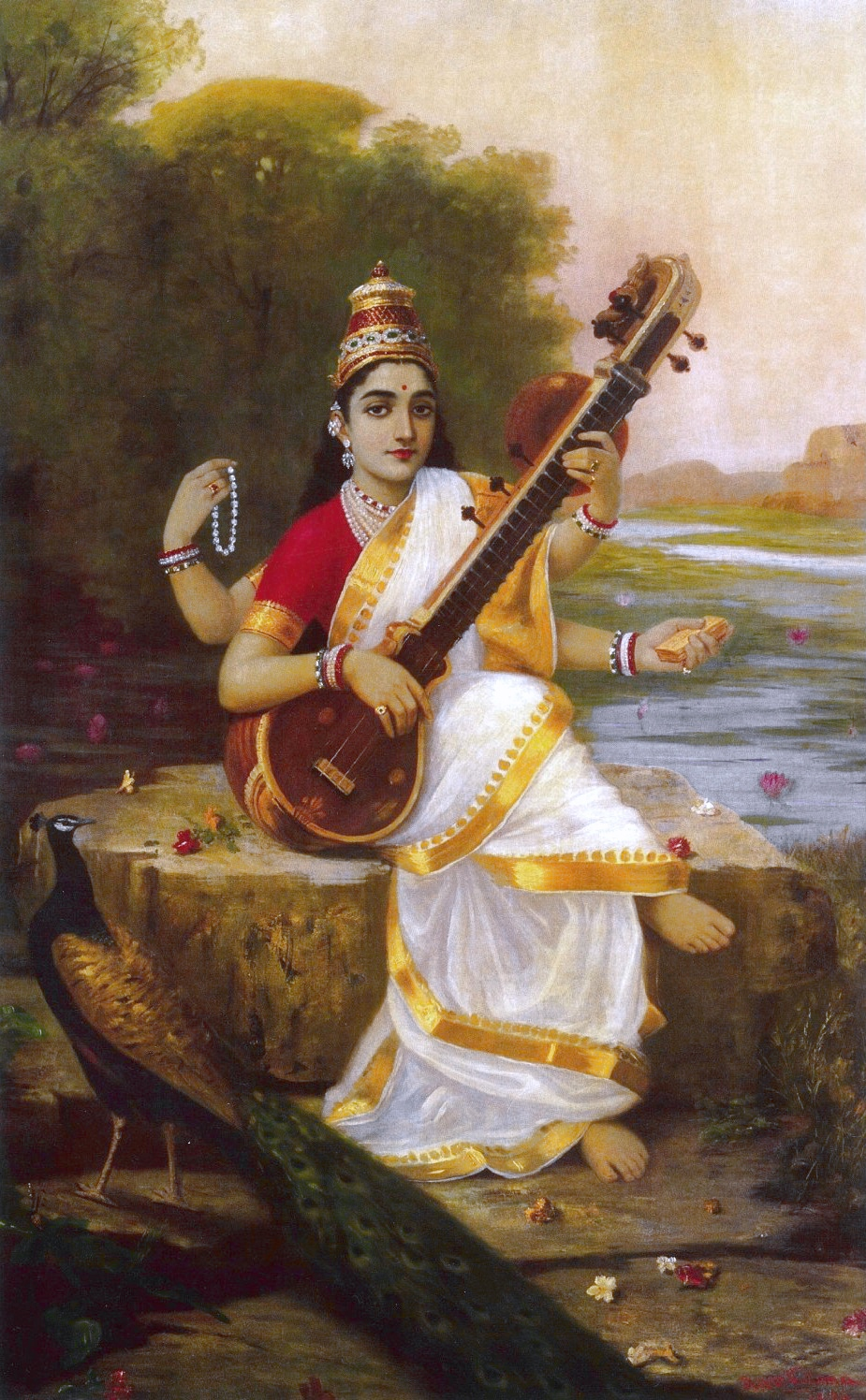
Saraswati, the Hindu goddess of all knowledge, music, arts and science, with her instrument, the veena.

Carnatic music originated in Karnataka and was named after it, known as Karnāṭaka Saṁgīta which spread through Andhra and Tamil countries where it flourished.

Like all art forms in Indian culture, Indian classical music is believed to be a divine art form that originated from the devas and devis (Hindu gods and goddesses), and is venerated as symbolic of nāda brāhman. Ancient treatises also describe the connection of the origin of the svaras, or notes, to the sounds of animals and birds and man's effort to simulate these sounds through a keen sense of observation and perception. The Samaveda, which is believed to have laid the foundation for Indian classical music, consists of hymns from the Rigveda, set to musical tunes that would be sung using three to seven musical notes during Vedic yajnas. The Yajurveda, which mainly consists of sacrificial formulae, mentions the veena as an accompaniment to vocal recitations. References to Indian classical music are made in many ancient texts, including epics like the Ramayana and the Mahabharata. The Yajnavalkya Smriti states, "vīṇāvādana tattvajñaḥ śrutijātiviśāradaḥ tālajñaścāprayāsena mokṣamārgaṃ niyacchati" ("The one who is well versed in veena, one who has the knowledge of srutis and one who is adept in tala, attains liberation (moksha) without doubt"). Contemporray Carnatic music is based on musical concepts (including svara, raga, and tala) that were described in detail in several ancient works, particularly the Bharata's Natya Shastra and Cilappatikaram by Ilango Adigal.

Owing to Persian and Islamic influences in North India from the 12th century onwards, Indian classical music began to diverge into two distinct styles — Hindustani music and Carnatic music. Commentaries and other works, such as Sharngadeva's Sangita Ratnakara, further elaborated on the musical concepts found in Indian classical music. By the 16th and 17th centuries, there was a clear demarcation between Carnatic and Hindustani music; Carnatic music remained relatively unaffected by Persian and Arabic influences. It was at this time that Carnatic music flourished in Vijayanagara, while the Vijayanagara Empire reached its greatest extent. Purandara Dasa, who is known as the "father (pitamaha) of Carnatic music", formulated the system that is commonly used for the teaching of Carnatic music. Venkatamakhin invented and authored the formula for the melakarta system of raga classification in his Sanskrit work, the Chaturdandi Prakasika (1660 AD). Govindacharya is known for expanding the melakarta system into the sampurna raga scheme – the system that is in common use today.

By the 16th century, Indian classical music split into two styles: Hindustani in the North and Karnataka (later called Carnatic) in the South. The term "Karnataka" music originated from the Vijayanagara Empire, historically known as the Karnataka Empire. The British later influenced the change in name to "Carnatic" music, and the term is only about 150–200 years old.

In the 18th and 19th centuries, Carnatic music was mainly patronised by the local kings of the Kingdom of Mysore, Kingdom of Travancore, and the Maratha rulers of Tanjore. Some of the royalty of the kingdoms of Mysore and Travancore were themselves noted composers and proficient in playing musical instruments, such as the veena, rudra veena, violin, ghatam, venu, mridangam, nadaswaram, and swarabat. Some famous court-musicians proficient in music were Veene Sheshanna (1852–1926) and Veene Subbanna (1861–1939), among others.

During the late 19th century, the city of Madras (now known as Chennai) emerged as the locus for Carnatic music. With the dissolution of the erstwhile princely states and the Indian independence movement reaching its conclusion in 1947, Carnatic music went through a radical shift in patronage into an art of the masses with ticketed performances organised by private institutions called sabhās.

=== Carnatic music outside of South India ===
From the 18th century, South Indian immigrant communities abroad increased, especially in Southeast Asia and Sri Lanka. Communities such as the Nattukottai Chettiars participate in the extension of the Carnatic cultural scene abroad, thanks to their rich patronage activity. Carnatic music artists therefore perform abroad among South Indian communities who request their coming, in order to enliven local community life. For a long time in Sri Lanka, Carnatic music was associated with Indian immigrants, and was often derogatorily referred to as "thosai kade music" ("music from the dosa shop"), in reference to the South Indians-owned restaurants and eateries that typically played this kind of music.

From the 20th century, Carnatic music gained significant popularity among certain social strata of the Sri Lankan population, who were then heavily influenced by a prominent cultural movement known as the Hindu revival. Carnatic music was thus appropriated and highly promoted during the 1920s and 1930s as a cultural and identity marker of the Colombo and Jaffna bourgeoisies, and by extension of the Sri Lankan Tamils. The place given to Carnatic music in the construction of a modern Sri Lankan Tamil identity has reached significant proportions, such as its rise in the curricula of most Jaffna colleges, where it gradually replaced from the mid-1930s the teaching of Western classical music, or its high esteem among the upper social classes of Colombo and Jaffna, where the learning of Carnatic music among young women is expected as a sign of good education. Many people have travelled to India for improving their skills, and the flow of students to India from Sri Lanka or of Sri Lankan Tamil origin is constantly increasing.

== Nature ==
The main emphasis in Carnatic music is on vocal music; most compositions are written to be sung, and even when played on instruments, they are meant to be performed in a singing style (known as gāyaki). Like Hindustani music, Carnatic music rests on two main elements: rāga, the modes or melodic formulae, and tāḷa, the rhythmic cycles.

Today, Carnatic music is presented by musicians in concerts or recordings, either vocally or through instruments. Carnatic music itself developed around musical works or compositions of phenomenal composers (see below).

== Important elements ==
=== Śruti ===
Śruti commonly refers to musical pitch. It is the approximate equivalent of a tonic (or less precisely a key) in Western music; it is the note from which all the others are derived. It is also used in the sense of graded pitches in an octave. While there are an infinite number of sounds falling within a scale (or raga) in Carnatic music, the number that can be distinguished by auditory perception is twenty-two (although over the years, several of them have converged). In this sense, while sruti is determined by auditory perception, it is also an expression in the listener's mind.

=== Svara ===
Svara refers to a type of musical sound that is a single note, which defines a relative (higher or lower) position of a note, rather than a defined frequency. Svaras also refer to the solfege of Carnatic music, which consist of seven notes, "sa-ri-ga-ma-pa-da-ni" (compare with the Hindustani sargam: sa-re-ga-ma-pa-dha-ni or Western do-re-mi-fa-so-la-ti). These names are abbreviations of the longer names shadja, rishabha, gandhara, madhyama, panchama, dhaivata and nishada. Unlike other music systems, every member of the solfege (called a swara) has three variants. The exceptions are the drone notes, shadja and panchama (also known as the tonic and the dominant), which have only one form; and madhyama (the subdominant), which has two forms. A 7th century stone inscription in Kudumiyan Malai in Tamil Nadu shows vowel changes to solfege symbols with ra, ri, ru etc. to denote the higher quarter-tones. In one scale, or raga, there is usually only one variant of each note present. The exceptions exist in "light" ragas, in which, for artistic effect, there may be two, one ascending (in the arohanam) and another descending (in the avarohanam).

=== Raga system ===
A raga in Carnatic music prescribes a set of rules for building a melody – very similar to the Western concept of mode. It specifies rules for movements up (aarohanam) and down (avarohanam), the scale of which notes should figure more and which notes should be used more sparingly, which notes may be sung with gamaka (ornamentation), which phrases should be used or avoided, and so on. In effect, it is a series of obligatory musical events that must be observed, either absolutely or with a particular frequency.

In Carnatic music, the sampoorna ragas (those with all seven notes in their scales) are classified into a system called the melakarta, which groups them according to the kinds of notes that they have. There are seventy-two melakarta ragas, thirty six of whose madhyama (subdominant) is shuddha (perfect fourth from the tonic), the remaining thirty-six of whose madhyama (subdominant) is prati (an augmented fourth from the tonic). The ragas are grouped into sets of six, called chakras ("wheels", though actually segments in the conventional representation) grouped according to the supertonic and mediant scale degrees. There is a system known as the katapayadi sankhya to determine the names of melakarta ragas.

Ragas may be divided into two classes: janaka ragas (i.e. melakarta or parent ragas) and janya ragas (descendant ragas of a particular janaka raga). Janya ragas are themselves subclassified into various categories.

=== Tala system ===
Tala refers to a fixed time cycle or metre, set for a particular composition, which is built from groupings of beats. Talas have cycles of a defined number of beats and rarely change within a song. They have specific components, which in combinations can give rise to the variety to exist (over 108), allowing different compositions to have different rhythms.

Carnatic music singers usually keep the beat by moving their hands up and down in specified patterns, and using their fingers simultaneously to keep time. Tala is formed with three basic parts (called angas) that are laghu, dhrtam, and anudhrtam, though complex talas may have other parts like plutam, guru, and kaakapaadam. There are seven basic tala groups that can be formed from the laghu, dhrtam, and anudhrtam:

- Ata tala
- Dhruva tala
- Eka tala
- Jhampa tala
- Matya tala
- Rupaka tala
- Triputa tala

A laghu has five variants (called jaathis) based on the counting pattern. Five jaathis times seven tala groups gives thirty-five basic talas, although use of other angas results in a total of 108 talas.

== Improvisation ==
Improvisation in raga is an essential aspect of Indian classical music. "Manodharma Sangeetam" or "kalpana Sangeetam" ("music of imagination") as it is known in Carnatic music, comprises several varieties of improvisation.

The main traditional forms of improvisation in Carnatic music are as follows:

- Alapana
- Niraval
- Pallavi
- Ragam
- Swarakalpana
- Tanam
- Tani Avartanam

=== Raga Alapana ===
An alapana, sometimes also called ragam, is the exposition of a raga or tone – a slow improvisation with no rhythm, where the raga acts as the basis of embellishment. In performing alapana, performers consider each raga as an object that has beginnings and endings and consists somehow of sequences of thought.

The performer will explore the ragam and touch on its various nuances, singing in the lower octaves first, then gradually moving up to higher octaves, while giving a hint of the song to be performed.

Theoretically, this ought to be the easiest type of improvisation, since the rules are so few, but in fact, it takes much skill to sing a pleasing, comprehensive (in the sense of giving a "feel for the ragam") and, most importantly, original raga alapana.

=== Niraval ===
Niraval, usually performed by the more advanced performers, consists of singing one or two lines of text of a song repeatedly, but with a series of melodic improvised elaborations. Although niraval consists of extempore melodic variations, generally, the original patterns of duration are maintained; each word in the lines of text stay set within their original place (idam) in the tala cycle. The lines are then also played at different levels of speed which can include double speed, triple speed, quadruple speed and even sextuple speed. The improvised elaborations are made with a view of outlining the raga, the tempo, and the theme of the composition.

=== Kalpanaswaram ===
Kalpanaswaram, also known as swarakalpana, consists of improvising melodic and rhythmic passages using swaras (solfa syllables). Like niraval, kalpanaswaras are sung to end on a particular swara in the raga of the melody and at a specific place (idam) in the tala cycle.

Kalpanaswaras have a somewhat predictable rhythmical structure; the swaras are sung to end on the samam (the first beat of the rhythmical cycle). The swaras can also be sung at the same speed or double the speed of the melody that is being sung, though some artists sing triple-speed phrases too.

Kalpanaswaram is the most elementary type of improvisation, usually taught before any other form of improvisation.

=== Tanam ===
Tanam is one of the most important forms of improvisation, and is integral to Ragam Tanam Pallavi. Originally developed for the veena, it consists of expanding the raga with syllables like tha, nam, thom, aa, nom, na, etc.

=== Ragam Tanam Pallavi ===
Ragam, Tanam, and Pallavi are the principal long form in concerts, and is a composite form of improvisation. As the name suggests, it consists of raga alapana, tanam, and a pallavi line. Set to a slow-paced tala, the pallavi line is often composed by the performer. Through niraval, the performer manipulates the pallavi line in complex melodic and rhythmic ways. The niraval is followed by kalpanaswarams.

=== Tani Avartanam ===
Tani Avartanam refers to the extended solo that is played by the percussionists in a concert, and is usually played after the main composition in a concert. The percussionist displays the full range of his skills and rhythmic imagination during the solo, which may take from two to twenty minutes.

== Compositions ==
In contrast to Hindustani music of the northern part of India, Carnatic music is taught and learned through compositions, which encode many intricate musical details, also providing scope for free improvisation. Nearly every rendition of a Carnatic music composition is different and unique as it embodies elements of the composer's vision, as well as the musician's interpretation.

A Carnatic composition really has two elements, one being the musical element, the other being what is conveyed in the composition. It is probably because of this fact that most Carnatic music compositions are composed for singing. In addition to the rich musical experience, each composition brings out the knowledge and personality of the composer, and hence the words are as important as the musical element itself. This poses a special challenge for the musicians because rendering this music does not involve just playing or singing the correct musical notes; the musicians are expected to understand what was conveyed by the composer in various languages, and sing musical phrases that act to create the effect that was intended by the composer in his/her composition.

There are many types/forms of compositions.

Geethams and swarajatis (which have their own peculiar composition structures) are principally meant to serve as basic learning exercises.

Compositions more commonly associated with Indian classical dance and Indian devotional music have also been increasingly used in the Carnatic music repertoire. The performance of the Sanskrit sloka, Tamil viruttam, Kannada Ugabhoga and Telugu padyamu or sisapadya forms are particularly unique. Though these forms consist of lyric-based verses, musicians improvise raga phrases in free rhythm, like an alapana, so both the sound value, and the meaning of the text, guide the musician through elaborate melodic improvisations. Forms such as the divya prabandham, thevaram and ugabhoga are often performed similarly, however, these forms can also have a set melody and rhythm like the devaranama, javali, padam, thillana and thiruppugazh forms.

The most common and significant forms in Carnatic music are the varnam and the kriti (or kirtanam).

=== Varnam ===
Varnams are short metric pieces which encapsulate the main features and requirements of a raga. The features and rules of the raga (also known as the sanchaaraas of a raga) include how each note of the raga should be stressed, the scale of the raga, and so on. All varnams consist of lyrics, as well as swara passages, including a pallavi, an anupallavi, muktayi swaras, a charanam, and chittaswaras.

Known for their complex structure, varnams are a fundamental form in Carnatic music. Varnams are practised as vocal exercises in multiple speeds by performers of Carnatic music, to help develop voice culture, and maintain proper pitch and control of rhythm. In Carnatic music concerts, varnams are often performed by musicians as the opening item – acting as a warm up for the musicians, and as a means of grabbing the attention of the audience.

=== Kriti ===
Carnatic songs (kritis) are varied in structure and style, but generally consist of three units:

1. Pallavi. This is the equivalent of a refrain in Western music, with 1 or 2 lines.
2. Anupallavi. This is the second verse, also as 2 lines.
3. Charana. The final (and longest) verse that wraps up the song. The Charanam usually borrows patterns from the Anupallavi. There can be multiple charanas.

This kind of song is called a keerthanam or a kriti. There are other possible structures for a kriti, which may in addition include swara passages named chittaswara. A chittaswara consists only of notes, and has no words. Still others have a verse at the end of the charana, called the madhyamakāla. It is sung immediately after the charana, but at double speed.

== Prominent composers ==
There are many composers in Carnatic music. Purandara Dasa (1484–1564) is referred to as the Pitamaha (the father or grandfather) of Carnatic music as he formulated the basic lessons in teaching Carnatic music, and in honour of his significant contribution to Carnatic music. He structured graded exercises known as Swaravalis and Alankaras, and at the same time, introduced the Raga Mayamalavagowla as the first scale to be learnt by beginners. He also composed Gitas (simple songs) for novice students.

The contemporaries Tyagaraja (1767– 1847), Muthuswami Dikshitar, (1776–1835) and Syama Sastri, (1762–1827) are regarded as the Trinity of Carnatic music because of the quality of Syama Sastri's compositions, the varieties of compositions of Muthuswami Dikshitar, and Tyagaraja's prolific output in composing kritis.

Prominent composers prior to the Trinity of Carnatic music include Sripadaraja, Vyasatirtha, Kanakadasa, Vadiraja Tirtha, Arunachala Kavi, Annamacharya, Narayana Theertha, Vijaya Dasa, Jagannatha Dasa, Gopala Dasa, Bhadrachala Ramadas, Sadasiva Brahmendra and Oottukkadu Venkata Kavi. Other composers are Swathi Thirunal, Gopalakrishna Bharathi, Neelakanta Sivan, Patnam Subramania Iyer, Mysore Vasudevachar, Koteeswara Iyer, Muthiah Bhagavathar, Subramania Bharathiyar, Kalyani Varadarajan, M. Balamuralikrishna and Papanasam Sivan. The compositions of these composers are rendered frequently by artists of today.

Composers of Carnatic music were often inspired by religious devotion and were usually scholars proficient in one or more of the languages Kannada, Malayalam, Sanskrit, Tamil, or Telugu. They usually included a signature, called a mudra, in their compositions. For example, all songs by Tyāgarāja (who composed in Sanskrit and Telugu) have the word Tyagaraja in them, all songs by Muttuswāmi Dīkṣitar (who composed in Sanskrit and Maṇipravāl̥am) have the words Guruguha in them; songs by Śyāma Śāstri (who composed in Sanskrit and Telugu) have the words Śyāma Kr̥ṣṇa in them; all songs by Purandaradasa (who composed in Kannada and Sanskrit) have the words Purandara Vitthala; while Gopalakrishna Bharathi (who composed in Tamil) used the signature Gopalakrishnan in his compositions. Papanasam Sivan, who has been hailed as the Tamil Tyagaraja of Carnatic music, composed in Tamil and Sanskrit, and used the signature Ramadasan in his compositions.

== Learning ==
Carnatic music is traditionally taught according to the system formulated by Purandara Dasa. This involves sarali swaras (graded exercises), alankaras (exercises based on the seven talas), geetams or simple songs, and Swarajatis. After the student has reached a certain standard, varnams are taught and later, the student learns kritis. It typically takes several years of learning before a student is adept enough to perform at a concert.

The learning texts and exercises are more or less uniform across all the South Indian states. The learning structure is arranged in increasing order of complexity. The lessons start with the learning of the sarali varisai (solfege set to a particular raga).

Carnatic music was traditionally taught in the gurukula system, where the student lived with and learnt the art from his guru (perceptor). From the late 20th century onwards, with changes in lifestyles and need for young music aspirants to simultaneously pursue a parallel academic career, this system has found few takers.

Musicians often take great pride in letting people know about their Guru Parampara, or the hierarchy of disciples from some prominent ancient musician or composer, to which they belong. People whose disciple-hierarchies are often referred to are Tyagaraja, Muthuswami Dikshitar, Syama Sastri, Swathi Thirunal and Papanasam Sivan, among others.

In modern times, it is common for students to visit their gurus daily or weekly to learn music. Though new technology has made learning easier with the availability of quick-learn media such as learning exercises recorded on audio cassettes and CDs, these are discouraged by most gurus who emphasize that face-to-face learning is best for students.

=== Notations ===
Notation is not a new concept in Indian music. However, Carnatic music continued to be transmitted orally for centuries without being written down. The disadvantage with this system was that if one wanted to learn about a kriti composed, for example, by Purandara Dasa, it involved the difficult task of finding a person from Purandara Dasa's lineage of students.

Written notation of Carnatic music was revived in the late 17th century and early 18th century, which coincided with rule of Shahaji II in Tanjore. Copies of Shahaji's musical manuscripts are still available at the Saraswati Mahal Library in Tanjore and they give us an idea of the music and its form. They contain snippets of solfege to be used when performing the mentioned ragas.

==== Melody ====
Unlike classical Western music, Carnatic music is notated almost exclusively in tonic sol-fa notation using either a Roman or Indic script to represent the solfa names. Past attempts to use the staff notation have mostly failed. Indian music makes use of hundreds of ragas, many more than the church modes in Western music. It becomes difficult to write Carnatic music using the staff notation without the use of too many accidentals. Furthermore, the staff notation requires that the song be played in a certain key. The notions of key and absolute pitch are deeply rooted in Western music, whereas the Carnatic notation does not specify the key and prefers to use scale degrees (relative pitch) to denote notes. The singer is free to choose the actual pitch of the tonic note. In the more precise forms of Carnatic notation, there are symbols placed above the notes indicating how the notes should be played or sung; however, informally this practice is not followed.

To show the length of a note, several devices are used. If the duration of note is to be doubled, the letter is either capitalized (if using Roman script) or lengthened by a diacritic (in Indian languages). For a duration of three, the letter is capitalized (or diacriticized) and followed by a comma. For a length of four, the letter is capitalized (or diacriticized) and then followed by a semicolon. In this way any duration can be indicated using a series of semicolons and commas.

However, a simpler notation has evolved that does not use semicolons and capitalization, but rather indicates all extensions of notes using a corresponding number of commas. Thus, Sā quadrupled in length would be denoted as "S,,,".

==== Rhythm ====
The notation is divided into columns, depending on the structure of the tāḷaṃ. The division between a laghu and a dhrutam is indicated by a।, called a ḍaṇḍā, and so is the division between two dhrutams or a dhrutam and an anudhrutam. The end of a cycle is marked by a॥, called a double ḍaṇḍā, and looks like a caesura.

== Performance ==
Carnatic music is usually performed by a small ensemble of musicians, who sit on an elevated stage. This usually consists of, at least, a principal performer, a melodic accompaniment, a rhythm accompaniment, and a drone.

Performances can be musical or musical-dramatic. Musical recitals are either vocal, or purely instrumental in nature, while musical-dramatic recitals refer to Harikatha. Regardless of what type of recital it is, what is featured are compositions which form the core of this genre of music.

=== Instrumentation ===
The tanpura is the traditional drone instrument used in concerts. However, tanpuras are increasingly being replaced by śruti boxes, and now more commonly, the electronic tanpura. The drone itself is an integral part of performances and furnishes stability – the equivalent of harmony in Western music.

In a vocal recital, a concert team may have one or more vocalists as the principal performer(s). Instruments, such as the Saraswati veena and/or venu flute, can be occasionally found as an accompaniment, but usually, a vocalist is supported by a violin player (who sits on his/her left). The rhythm accompanist is usually a mridangam player (who sits on the other side, facing the violin player). However, other percussion instruments such as the ghatam, kanjira and morsing frequently also accompany the main percussion instrument and play in an almost contrapuntal fashion along with the beats.

The objective of the accompanying instruments is far more than following the melody and keeping the beats. The accompaniments form an integral part of every composition presented, and they closely follow and augment the melodic phrases outlined by the lead singer. The vocalist and the violinist take turns while elaborating or while exhibiting creativity in sections like raga, niraval and kalpanaswaram.

Unlike Hindustani music concerts, where an accompanying tabla player can keep beats without following the musical phrases at times, in Carnatic music, the accompanists have to follow the intricacies of the composition since there are percussion elements such as eduppu in several compositions.

Some concerts feature a good bit of interaction with the lead musicians and accompanists exchanging notes, and accompanying musicians predicting the lead musician's musical phrases.

=== Contemporary concert content ===
A contemporary Carnatic music concert (called a kutcheri) usually lasts about three hours, and comprises a number of varied compositions. Carnatic songs are composed in a particular raga, which means that they do not deviate from the notes in the raga. Each composition is set with specific notes and beats, but performers improvise extensively. Improvisation occurs in the melody of the composition as well as in using the notes to expound the beauty of the raga.

Concerts usually begin with a varnam or an invocatory item which will act as the opening piece. The varnam is composed with an emphasis on swaras of the raga, but will also have lyrics, the saahityam. It is lively and fast to get the audience's attention. An invocatory item may usually follow the varnam.

After the varnam and/or invocatory item, the artist sings longer compositions called kirtanas (commonly referred to as kritis). Each kriti sticks to one specific raga, although some are composed with more than one raga; these are known as ragamalika (a garland of ragas).

After singing the opening kriti, usually, the performer sings the kalpanaswaram of the raga to the beat. The performer must improvise a string of swaras in any octave according to the rules of the raga and return to beginning of the cycle of beats smoothly, joining the swaras with a phrase selected from the kriti. The violin performs these alternately with the main performer. In very long strings of swara, the performers must calculate their notes accurately to ensure that they stick to the raga, have no awkward pauses or lapses in the beat of the song, and create a complex pattern of notes that a knowledgeable audience can follow.

Performers then begin the main compositions with a section called raga alapana exploring the raga. In this, they use the sounds aa, ri, na, ta, etc. instead of swaras to slowly elaborate the notes and flow of the raga. This begins slowly and builds to a crescendo, and finally establishes a complicated exposition of the raga that shows the performer's skill. All of this is done without any rhythmic accompaniment, or beat. Then the melodic accompaniment (violin or veena), expounds the raga. Experienced listeners can identify many ragas after they hear just a few notes. With the raga thus established, the song begins, usually with lyrics. In this, the accompaniment (usually violin, sometimes veena) performs along with the main performer and the percussion (such as a mridangam). In the next stage of the song, they may sing niraval or kalpanaswaram again.

In most concerts, the main item will at least have a section at the end of the item, for the percussion to perform solo (called the tani avartanam). The percussion artists perform complex patterns of rhythm and display their skill. If multiple percussion instruments are employed, they engage in a rhythmic dialogue until the main performer picks up the melody once again. Some experienced artists may follow the main piece with a ragam thanam pallavi mid-concert, if they do not use it as the main item.

Following the main composition, the concert continues with shorter and lighter songs. Some of the types of songs performed towards the end of the concerts are tillanas and thukkadas – bits of popular kritis or compositions requested by the audience. Every concert that is the last of the day ends with a mangalam, a thankful prayer and conclusion to the musical event.

=== Audience ===
The audience of a typical concert will have some understanding of Carnatic music. It is also typical to see the audience tapping out the tala in sync with the artist's performance. As and when the artist exhibits creativity, the audience acknowledge it by clapping their hands. With experienced artists, towards the middle of the concert, requests start flowing in. The artist usually sings the requests, and it helps in exhibiting the artist's broad knowledge of the several thousand kritis that are in existence.

=== Festivals ===
Various music festivals featuring Carnatic music performances are held in India, and throughout the world.

With the city of Chennai (then known as Madras) emerging as the locus for Carnatic music during the 19th century, its musicians founded the Tyagaraja Aradhana festival in 1846. The Aradhana festival is an annual death-anniversary celebration of the prolific Carnatic music composer, Tyagaraja. Held in the city of Thiruvayaru, thousands of musicians attend the festival to perform his compositions. Since its inception, other festivals were started in a similar manner throughout India and abroad, such as the Chembai Sangeetholsavam in the Indian city of Guruvayur, and the Aradhana in the US city of Cleveland.

The city of Chennai also holds a six-week-long grand "Music Season", which has been described as the world's largest cultural event. The Music Season was started in 1927, to mark the opening of the Madras Music Academy. It used to be a traditional month-long Carnatic music festival, but since then it has also diversified into dance and drama, as well as non-Carnatic art forms. Some concert organisers also feature their own Carnatic music festivals during the season. Thousands of performances are held by hundreds of musicians across various venues in the city.

The Karnataka Ganakala Parishat is an annual conference of Carnatic music, held in February every year, which has lectures and demonstrations in the morning, and performances in the afternoons and evenings.

== See also ==
- List of Carnatic composers
- List of composers who created ragas
- List of Carnatic singers
- List of Carnatic instrumentalists
- Trinity of Carnatic music

== Bibliography ==
- Charles Russel Day (1891). The Music and Musical Instruments of southern India and the Deccan. William Gibb (lllus.). Novello, Ewer & Co., London -.
- "[Carnatic music]". Encyclopædia Britannica (15 ed.). 2005.
- Panchapakesa Iyer, A. S. (2003). Gānāmruta Varna Mālikā. Gānāmruta Prachuram.
