= Trichur C. Narendran =

Indian musician (born 1951)

Thrichur.C.Narendran

Background information
- Born: 15 December 1951 (age 74)
- Origin: Thrissur, India
- Genre: Carnatic Music
- Occupation: Mridangam performer
- Instrument: mridangam
- Years active: 1961 to present

Thrissur C. Narendran is a Mridangam (मृदंगम्,மிருதங்கம்,മൃദംഗം,:ಮೃದಂಗ,మృదంగం) artiste from Kerala, India. His intricate rhythmic patterns, sense of proportion, sharp anticipation, short & carefully thought out phases of silence, and the ability to give the Mridangam the much-needed soft touch sets Trichur C. Narendran a apart. Narendran has also accompanied more than five generations of musicians.

== Early life ==
Narendran was born to Late Venugopala Raja of Manakulam Palace (the royal family of Thalapilly, Thrissur, Kerala, India and Late Sarojini.V.Raja on 15 December 1951 . Narendran inherits a legacy of performing art. Manakulam Late Valiya Kunhunni Raja "Kakkad Karanavarppad", the progenitor of the Temple of performing Art of Kerala – "Kerala Kalamandalam" was his maternal grandfather. He grew up with his elder brother (violinist Thrissur C. Rajendran) and sister (vocalist Prema Balachandran) in an ambience of Music and Art.

== Musical training ==
Born in a family of musicians and scholars, Narendran was initiated into an early training in Mridangam by Sri Kongorppilly Parameswaran Namboodiri who spotted his talent during a dance rehearsal at an annual family get together at Manakkulam Palace, and started teaching Narendran the basics of Mridangam when he was just seven. It was David Bhagavathar of Kunnamkulam who instilled in him the interest in music and inspired him to seriously take up the Mridangam. Later it was Sri E P Narayana Pisharodi and Koduvayur Radhakrishnan who trained him further. Narendran had the rarest privileges to be one of the early disciples of Palghat R Raghu from 1973. It was the scholarship awarded by the Government of India that provided the fecundity for him to learn the finer and the most intricate techniques of mridangam playing from Mridangam Maestro Padmashri Palghat R. Raghu.

== Career ==
Narendran has been exposed to the concert platform from a very early age of 10.

- He has played for Chembai Vaidyanatha Bhagavathar and K. J. Yesudas at Peringode at the age of 15 along with his elder brother Thrissur.C.Rajendran.
- Narendran had the rare privilege of performing together with his guru Palghat R Raghu in the Jass Yatra Festival in Bombay in the year 1978.
- From a very young age, Narendran has been accompanying throughout India with maestros like Semmangudi Srinivasa Iyer, M S Subbulakshmi, Palghat K. V. Narayanaswamy, Dr M. Balamuralikrishna, T. M. Thiagarajan, Nedunuri Krishnamurthy, Voletti Venkateswarulu, Dr S. Ramanathan, D. K. Jayaraman, M. D. Ramanathan, S. Kalyanaraman, Maharajapuram Santhanam, D. K. Pattammal, T. Brinda, M.L. Vasanthakumari, K S Narayanaswamy, T.N. Krishnan, Lalgudi Jayaraman, M.S. Gopalakrishnan, Dr S. Balachander, Dr N. Ramani, L. Subramaniam, T. Viswanathan, Jon B. Higgins, M. Chandrasekaran, V V Subramanyam, R. K. Srikantan, TR Subramaniam, T K Govinda Rao, Madurai G S Mani, T. N. Seshagopalan, Trichur V. Ramachandran, T. V. Gopalakrishnan, T. V. Sankaranarayanan, Neyyattinkara Vasudevan, K J Yesudas, O. S. Thyagarajan, Bombay Sisters, E. Gayathri, Padmavathy Ananthagopalan, Rajeswari Padmanabhan, and Karaikudi S Subramanian
- He has provided accompaniment to the present day vidwans like U. Srinivas, N. Ravikiran, N Vijay Siva, P. Unnikrishnan, Sanjay Subrahmanyan, Maharajapuram S. Ramachandran, T M Krishna, Sreevalsan J. Menon, Maharajapuram S Srinivasan, Sudha Raghunathan, Bombay Jayashree, Shashank Subramanyam, Palakkad R Ramaprasad, TNS Krishna, Sankaran Namboothiri, Abshek Raghuraman, Sikkil Gurucharan and so on. He also has many foreign concerts to his credit :-
- 1982– USA With K S Narayanaswami
- 1982– JAPAN with Dr L Subramanyam
- 1983– USA – CANADA– England with K. V. Narayanaswamy
- 1984 TO 1986 - Taught Mridangam in SAN DIEGO STATE UNIVERSITY, CALIFORNIA, USA as a visiting professor and provided Mridangam accompaniment to the visiting artistes Sri RK srikantan and Veena Gayathri
- 1987– DUBAI – MUSCAT- with K. V. Narayanaswamy
- 1989– USA - DUBAI- ABUDHABI with Bombay Sisters
- 1995– USA - CANADA with Padmavathi and Jayanthi
- 1996– He was a part of the 50th year celebration of UNESCO in France
- 1997– USA - CANADA with Bombay Jayasri
- 2001– USA - CANADA With P. Unnikrishnan
- 2008– GERMANY & FINLAND With Dr. Karaikudi S Subramanian & Shankari Krishnan
- 2015- USA Concerts with Palakkad R Ramprasad
- 2017- USA Concerts with Palakkad R Ramprasad
- 2018- USA Concerts with Palakkad R Ramprasad
- 2019- USA Concerts with Palakkad R Ramprasad

== Stint with A.I.R ==
It was at the age of 17 that he won first prize in A I R Music competition. In the Commercial CD released by A I R of Palghat K V Narayanaswami, with M S G on the violin, Narendran has provided mridangam accompaniment. He was a staff at All India Radio from 1992 to 2011. He is a Top rank artiste of All India Radio.

== Awards and Accolades ==
- Thanjavur Vaidyanatha Iyer award by Sri Ragam Fine Arts
- NADAKKANAL in 1999
- Maharajapuram Santhanam Foundation Meritorious award in 1999
- VANI KALA SUDHAKARA by Thyagabrahma Gana Sabha in 2000
- ASTHANA VIDWAN OF KANCHI MUTT in 2001
- LAYAVADHYA CHATHURA BY ANNA NAGAR MUSIC CIRCLE TRUST & SADGURU SANGITA VIDYALAYA IN 2010
- LAYA VIDHYADHARA by IRAIPANI MANDRUM Kottivakkam in 2011
- LAYA KALAVIPANCHI From Dr M. Balamuralikrishna on 31 December 2011
- MADHURA MURALI PURASKAR from legend Dr M balamuralikrishna on his 82nd birthday in 2012.
- SANGEETHA THILAKAM from Thiruvambadi Devaswom in December 2012
- LAYAPRATHIBHA - HARMONIAM CHAKRAVARTHY KOTTARA SANKUNNY NAIR MEMORIAL AWARD 2013 – EDAPPALLY.
- DASA KALA RATHNA BY SHRI PRANDARADAASAR TRUST CHENNAI ON 1-3-2015
- Dr. UMAYALPURAM SIVARAMAN AWARD FOR THE "BEST MRUDANGA VIDWAN" for the year 2014-15 on 17.12.2015.
- "VALAYAPATTI" AWARD ON 24-12-2016
- KALASEVA NIRATHA From Thyagaraja Vidwath Samajam on 02-05-2017
- MAHARAJAPURAM MEMORIAL AWARD 2018 ON 01-01-2019
- "MRIDANGA KALA SHIROMANI" PALGHAT MANI IYER MEMORIAL AWARD FROM PERCUSSIVE ARTS CENTRE PLGHAT MANI IYER ATRS CENTRE ON 14-07-2019

Narendran moved to Chennai in 1973. He is now retired from All India Radio and settled in Chennai.

== Sources ==
- – KutcheriBuzz.com
- – The Hindu
- -carnatica.net
- -carnaticcorner.com
- -indianewengland.com
- -Mysoorunews.com
