= Isai Vellalar =

Tamil community traditionally involved in the arts of music and dance

Isai Velalar
- Classification: Other Backward Class
- Religions: Hinduism
- Languages: Tamil, Telugu
- Country: India
- Populated states: Tamil Nadu • Kerala • Andhra Pradesh • Karnataka
- Region: Northern Tamil Nadu, Southern Andhra Pradesh
- Ethnicity: South Asian
- Subdivisions: Nayanakkarar • Nattuvanar • Melakkarar • Devaradiyar

Isai Vellalar is a community found in India in Tamil Nadu. They are traditionally involved as performers of classical dance and music in Hindu temples and courts of the patrons. The term "Isai Velalar" is a recent community identity, people of minstrel occupation from various castes such as, Melakkarar, Nayanakkarar and Nattuvanar come under this term.

Isai Vellalars are a micro community. Out of all the divisions, Melakkarars are the predominant Isai Vellalars. Edgar Thurston noted that the community had two linguistic sects within the state; being Tamil and Telugu. Tamil-speaking Melakkarars traditionally performed both ‘Chinna Melam’ (nautch music) and/or ‘Periya Melam’(nadaswaram), while Telugu-speaking Melakkarars of Tamil Nadu performed only ‘Periya Melam.’ and have nothing to do with dancing, The Chinna Melam Tamils have dancing at its core, Telugu Melakkarars had surname like ‘Reddi’ and ‘Naidu’, while the Tamil sect used ‘Pillai’ and 'Mudali' title. The Tamil speaking melakkarars are shaivites. There are also other sects like Nattuvanar, Naayanakkarar, Devaradiyar etc. under Isai Vellalar label. Some from this community were made devadasis until its abolition.

== Social status ==
They are listed as a Most Backward Class in the state of Tamil Nadu.

== Etymology ==
The term Isai Vellalar derives from the Tamil words Isai meaning "music" and vellar a generic term roughly meaning "cultivator", thus translates as "cultivators of music". This term was introduced after the legal abolition of the Devadasi system as a result of the reform and anti-nautch movement in 1947.

== History ==
The Isai Velalar communities were originally nomads. Bardic traditions are referred in early Sangam literature and well into the early Pallava and Pandya periods. These were primarily ritualistic and defensive in nature. The artistic side of music and dance came to be strengthened during the Chola and Vijayanagara period.

Early Chola inscriptions mentions Tevaratiyar as recipients of food offering and ritual performers of the temples, and was a term carrying honorific and high connotations. Inscriptional evidences indicates devadasis to have been independent professionals who enjoyed property (made large land donations to temples) and a respectable position in the society. The 11th-century inscription of Rajaraja I states that the Tevaratiyar were invited to serve the Brihadisvara Temple and were given land near the temple.

Under the patronage of the Nayaks of Tanjavur and Thanjavur Maratha kings, Telugu musicians and Devadasis from Andhra Pradesh and Maharashtra migrated to the Thanjavur region. The Melakkarars of Thanjavur are therefore divided in two distinct linguistic groups – the Tamil and Telugu Melakkarar.

With the entry of Colonial India, great loss of temple patronage resulted in the Tevaratiyar looking for other ways of income which degraded their social status. The Devadasi system was legally abolished in 1947 after the campaigns of the social reformers Moovalur Ramamirtham and Muthulakshmi Reddi. The entry of Tamil Brahmins in music and dance was seen as a threat to the traditional performers of these art forms. This led communities traditionally associated with music and dance to start forming a politicized non-Brahmin caste association which they coined as "Isai Velalar Sangam" and thereby created a political unified identity.

== Notable people ==
=== Historical personalities ===
- Muthu Thandavar

=== Social activists ===
- Moovalur Ramamirtham

=== Politicians ===
- MK Stalin
- Udhayanidhi Stalin
- M Karunanidhi
- Murasoli Maran
- S. S. Thennarasu
- MK Azhagiri
- Dhayanidhi Maran

=== Business personalities ===
- Kalanithi Maran
- Kavya Maran

=== Arts ===
- Thanjavur Quartet
- R Muthukannammal
- Veenai Dhanammal
- T. Brinda
- T. Muktha
- Valayapatti A. R. Subramaniam
- P. R. Thilagam
- Namagiripettai Krishnan
- Thiruvarur Bakthavathsalam
- S. Somasundaram
- Balasaraswathi

=== Cinema ===
- Arulnidhi
- Sivakarthikeyan
