= Nagamani Srinath =

Indian Carnatic music vocalist

- Born: 7 April 1950 (age 76); Mysore, Kingdom of Mysore, British India
- Occupations: Carnatic vocalist, guru
- Awards: Sangeet Natak Akademi Award (2010)

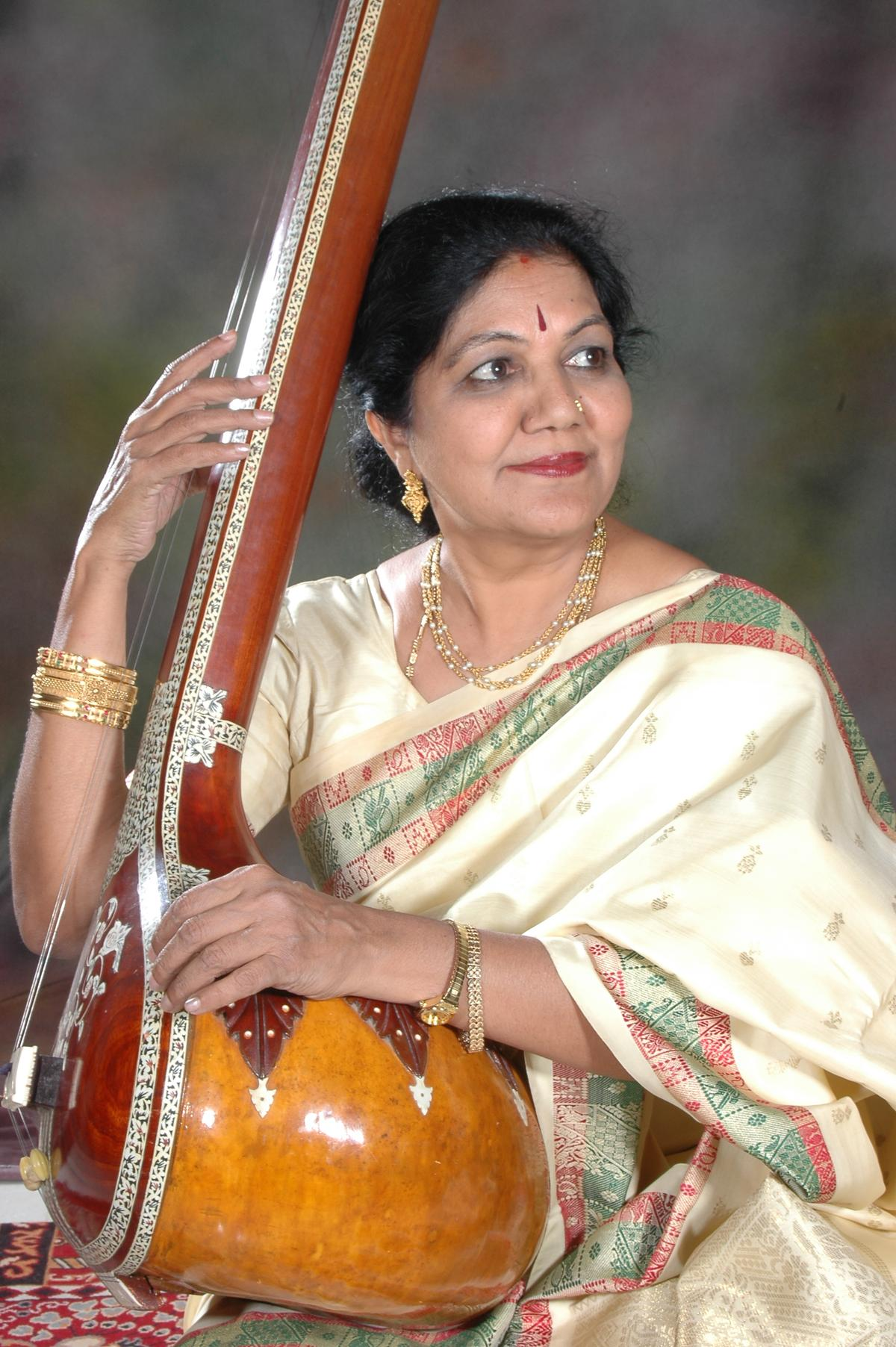
Dr. Mysore Nagamani Srinath

Prof. Dr. G. N. Nagamani Srinath (born 7 April 1950) is an Indian classical vocalist, composer, music educator, researcher and academic from Mysore, Karnataka, India. She has had a performing career spanning over six decades and is known for her contributions to Carnatic Music as a performer, teacher, author and institution builder.

== Early life and training ==
Nagamani Srinath was born in Jodi Gubbi village in Hassan district to G. N. Narayana and G. N. Venkatalakshamma. She started learning Carnatic music at an early age from Arekere Narayana Rao. She graduated with music as one of her subjects and got Central Government Scholarship to study music in Chennai.

At the age of 20, Nagamani Srinath became a disciple of Carnatic vocalist Ramnad Krishnan and received training under the gurukula system. She also received mentorship from M. L. Vasanthakumari, T. Brinda, T. Mukta, T. N. Krishnan, Palghat K. V. Narayanaswamy, D. K. Jayaraman, T. M. Tyagarajan, Gowri Kuppuswamy, V. Ramarathnam, R. Visweswaran and Parur Anantharaman

Academically, she obtained a Bachelors degree in Arts from the University of Mysore, graduating with a gold medal, followed by a master's degree from the same university. She also earned a Postgrature Diploma in Music from the Government of Tamil Nadu where, graduating with a gold medal. In 2014, Tumkur University conferred upon her the Doctor of Literature (D.Litt).

== Career ==
Nagamani Srinath began performing in public at a young age, and has maintained an active concert career over six decades. She has performed at major music festivals and venues acros India. Internationally, she has presented concerts in the United States, Australia, Singapore, United Kingdom, Canada, United Arab Emirates, Europe, Hong Kong and Malaysia. She has also participated in concerts held by the Indian Council for Cultural Relations (ICCR).

In 2024, she published a book, Antaraalada Alaapane, about her experiences as a Carnatic vocalist.

She is an "Top Grade" artist of the All India Radio & Doordarshan, performing for their National Programmes and Radio Sangeet Sammelans.

== Academic & Teaching Career ==
Nagamani Srinath served as the professor of Music and the Head of the Department of Music at Maharani's Arts and Commerce College. She also served as the visiting faculty at Bangalore University and Mahaveer Jain University.

Over several decades, she has trained numerous students, many of whom have gone on to establish careers as performers and teachers. She has conducted workshops and lecture demonstrations and online training programs in Carnatic Music.

== Awards and recognition ==
- 1998 Rajyotsava Prashasti Award
- 2010 Sangeet Natak Akademi Award
- 2010 KK Murthy Memorial Chowdaiah Award
- 2015 Sangita Kala Acharya award from the Madras Music Academy for her work as a performer and teacher
- 2018 Lalitha Kala Suma Award.
- 2023 Ganayogi Pandit Panchakshari Gavai National Award.
- 2025 Shyama Gaana Bhushana Award by M. A. Narasimhachar Music Foundation.
- 2026 Nadabrahma Award from the Nadabrahma Sangeetha Sabha, Mysore.

== Personal life ==
Nagamani Srinath resides in Bengaluru with her husband Srinath, where she continues to teach and perform.
