= Alamelu Mani =

- Born: Alamelu; 4 October 1934 (age 92); Mumbai, British India
- Occupation: Singer
- Spouse: Anantha Subramani
- Children: Hariharan
- Awards: Sangeet Natak Akademi Award (2018)
- Musical career
- Genre: Carnatic music
- Instrument: Vocals

Alamelu Mani (born 4 October 1934) is an Indian Carnatic vocalist and music teacher from Mumbai, India. She is the mother of singer Hariharan. In 2018 she received the Sangeet Natak Akademi Award in Carnatic music.

== Biography ==
Alamelu Mani was born on 4 October 1934, at Mumbai, Maharashtra. Her father, Varadhan, was a harmonium player. Hariharan, an Indian playback singer is her only son.

== Musical career ==
Alamelu was given her first music lessons by her grandmother when she was three years old. At the age of ten she started studying Carnatic music under H.A.S. Mani, whom she later married. Her studies were interrupted when Mani died when she was 28, but a year later, she resumed her studies with T. Brinda, a follower of the Devadasi tradition of Carnatic music, T. Muktha and Tanjavur V. Sankara Iyer.

In Carnatic music, she is an exponent in Padams and Javalis. Alamelu is an A Grade artist of All India Radio (since 1968) and Doordarshan.

As a Carnatic music teacher, Alamelu has taught over 1,000 students from around the world. Since 1963, she serves as the principal of the South Indian School of Music in Mumbai, founded by her husband H.A.S. Mani.

== Notable students ==
Alamelu is not only the mother of singer Hariharan but also his first music teacher. Singer Shriram Iyer is among her students. Geetha Raja, awarded 'Kalaimamani' title by Tamil Nadu Government, is also her student.

== Awards and honors ==
Alamelu received many titles and awards including Gold Medal in the music competition by All India Radio, Gurukripa Award by the Shankar Mahadevan Academy, T. Brinda memorial award by Cleveland Thyagaraja Festival, USA, Dronacharya Award from The Rotary Club of Madras East, the Sri Shanmukananda Dr M. S. Subbulakshmi Sangeetha Pracharya Award, Sur Mani title by Sur Singar Samsad, Mumbai, Acharya Chudamani title by Krishna Gana Sabha, Chennai, Gananandacharya title from TSN's Percussive Arts Centre (TSNPAC) and Sangeetha Booshana title by Sri Ranjini Sangeetha Sabha. In 2018 she received the Sangeet Natak Akademi Award in Carnatic vocal.
