= Narthaki Nataraj =

Indian Bharatanatyam dancer

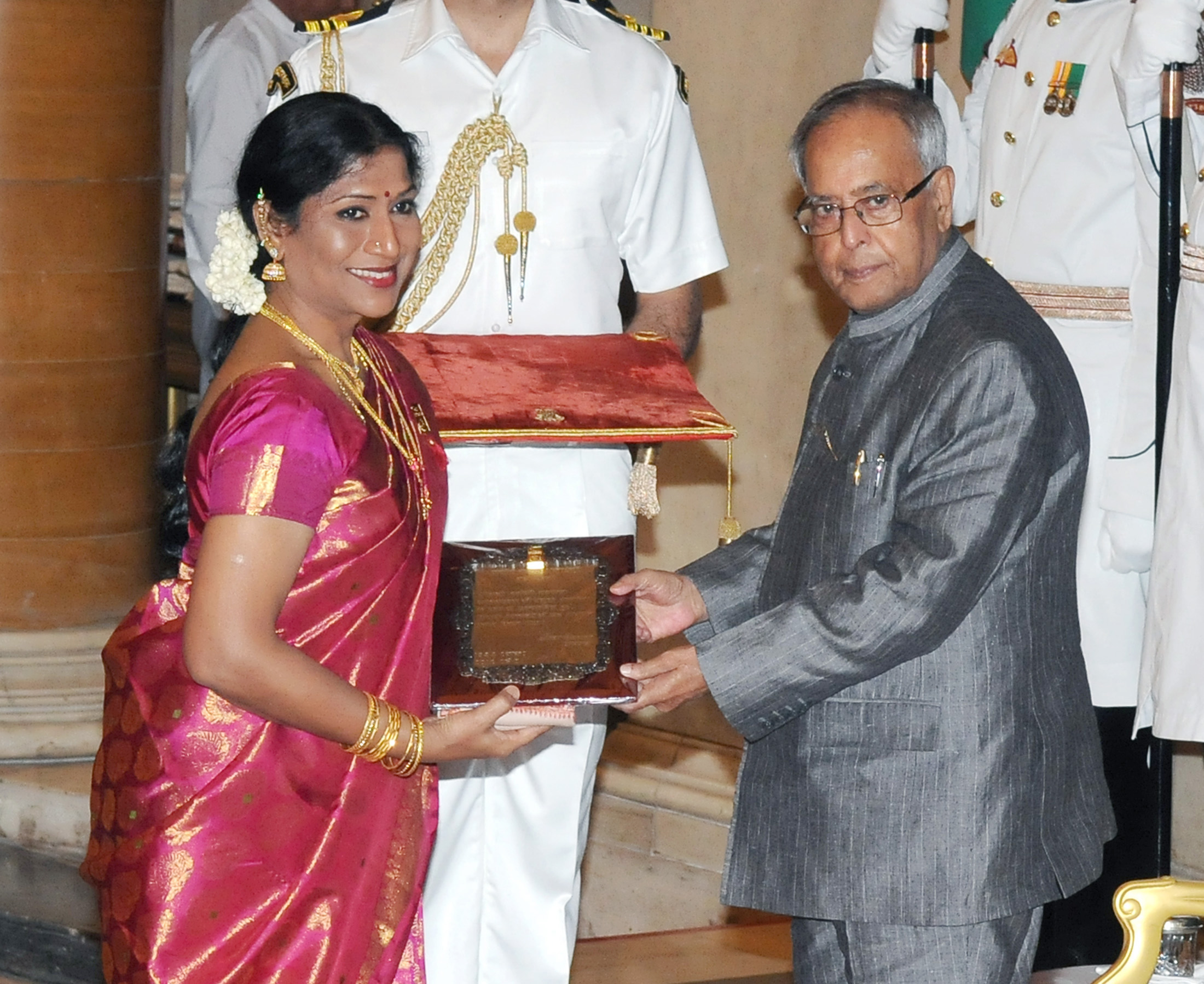
- Pranab Mukherjee presenting the Sangeet Natak Akademi Award-2011 to Narthaki Nataraj
- Born: Madurai, Tamil Nadu, India
- Occupation: Bharatanatyam dancer
- Awards: Padma Shri (2019)

Narthaki Nataraj is an Indian Bharatanatyam dancer. In 2019, she was awarded the Padma Shri, making her the first transgender woman to be awarded India's fourth-highest civilian award.

== Early life ==
Narthaki Nataraj was born in Madurai, Tamil Nadu. In an interview, she said she became aware of her feminine side at the age of 10 and found dance to be the only way of expressing herself. Owing to societal pressures and stigma, she ran away from her home at the age of 12.

She started her training in dance under Namanur Jeyaraman of the Tanjavur bani. She later became a disciple of K. P. Kittappa Pillai in 1984, who was a direct descendant of the Thanjavur Quartet.

== Career ==
Narthaki Nataraj took the name "Narthaki" during her debut performance as a woman in 1983. She worked as a demonstration assistant to Kittappa Pillai in Tanjore Tamil University. She established a dance school Narthaki Nritya Kalalaya in Madurai to take her guru's vision forward. In 2000, she moved to Chennai and has been a full time professional dancer since then.

She specialises in the Tanjore-based Nayaki Bhava tradition. She established a dance school Velliambalam Nadana Kalai Koodam in Chennai and Madurai, with her friend Shakti Bhaskar, where she trains her students in the traditional repertoire of Thanjavur Quartets. The school has branches in the U.S., the U.K. and Canada.

She along with her friend, Shakti, has been conducting annual workshops at the government department of music in Oslo. They teach Indian and Norwegian students the Tevaram, Tiruppugazh and Tiruvachakam.

Her life and journey has been included as a lesson in the 11th standard Tamil text book by the Tamil Nadu government in 2018. In 2019, she was awarded the Padma Shri, making her the first transgender woman to be awarded India's fourth-highest civilian award.

== Social reforms ==
Narthaki Nataraj was stopped at many airports as her passport denoted the alphabet "U" for her gender. In 2002, she took part in one of the earliest campaigns for the rights of transgender people. She pursued Union Home Ministry to change the alphabet "U", representing eunuchs for transgender people in India to alphabet "F", representing female.

She also took part in the fight to replace the derogatory Tamil word aravani with thirunangai, meaning "supreme woman" in the official circulars of the Tamil Nadu government. In November 2019, the government has changed the denomination to use the old word of moondram paalinathavar.

== Awards ==
- Kalaimamani Award of Tamil Nadu Government in 2007
- Nritya Choodamani Award from Krishna Gana Sabha in 2009
- Sangeet Natak Akademi Award in 2011
- Vetri Award from University of Madras in 2013
- Honorary Doctorate from Periyar Maniammai University 2016
- ICCR Empanelled Dance Artist in Outstanding Category 2017
- Padma Shri from the Government of India in 2019
