= Kshetrayya =

Telugu Poet (1600–1680)

Kshetrayya (c. 1600–1680) was a prolific Telugu poet, who lived in what is now Andhra Pradesh in South India. He composed a number of padams and keertanas, the prevalent formats of his time. He is credited with more than 4000 compositions, although only a handful have survived. He composed his songs on his favourite Hinduism deity Krishna (Gopala) in Telugu.

He was born to a Telugu Brahmin family in a village called Movva (or Muvva), in Krishna district, Andhra Pradesh. His parents named him Varadayya. Because of his habit of traveling from one place to another singing his songs at temples, he came to be called Kshetragna or Kshetrayya (one who travels). He married a Devadasi named Mohanangi. He learned his music from guru VenkaTamakhi (author of 72-melakartha scheme).

He perfected the padam format that is still used today. His padams are sung in dance (Bharatanatyam and Kuchipudi) and music recitals. A unique feature of his padams is the practice of singing the anupallavi first then the pallavi (second verse followed by first verse). Most of the padams are of the theme of longing for the coming of the Lord Krishna.

He wrote with Sringara as a main theme in expressing madhurabhakti (devotion to the supreme). Sringara is a motif where the mundane sexual relationship between a Nayaki (woman) and a Nayaka (man) is used as a metaphor, denoting the yearning of jeeva (usually depicted as the Nayaki) to unite with the divine (usually depicted as the man). In most of his compositions, Kshetrayya has used the mudra (signature) "Muvva Gopala" as a reference to himself, which is also a name for the Lord Krishna in Kshetrayya's village Muvva in Krishna District of Andhra Pradesh State, now called as Movva.

Kshetrayya's work has played a major role in influencing poetry, dance, music of the South Indian tradition. Kshetrayya was intimately connected with the devadasi women of the temples of south India, who were the subject of many of his compositions. The devadasis traditionally possessed the musical/poetic interpretations of his work for a long period till the devadasi system was abolished and the compositions became more accepted in the musical community as valuable works of art. The musical community owes a lot to the legendary Veena Dhanammal, T. Brinda, T. Muktha, T. Balasaraswathi and T. Jayammal, who popularized Kshetrayya's songs with their beautiful musical interpretation.

Kshetrayya's padams now form an integral part of the dance and musical traditions of South India, where his songs are rendered purely as musical works or as accompaniments to dance.

== Telugu film ==
Mahakavi Kshetrayya is a 1976 Telugu film produced by Anjali Pictures and starring Akkineni Nageswara Rao and Anjali Devi. The film's soundtrack was sung by V. Ramakrishna and composed by P. Adinarayana Rao.

== Biographic novel ==
The life of Kshetragna is depicted in the novel Bliss Of Life by M. V. Rama Sarma, professor of English and former vice chancellor, S.V. University, Tirupati, Andhra Pradesh, India. It is translated into Telugu with the title Kshetrayya.
