= Narendran =

Narendran may refer to

- T. V. Narendran, Tata Steel Manager.
- Trichur C. Narendran, Mridangam artist.
- T. C. Narendran, Indian entomologist
- Narendran Commission, Indian Commission.
- Narendran Makan Jayakanthan Vaka, Malayalam film.
