= Aniruddha Knight =

Aniruddha Knight (November 13, 1980) is an artist of the Indian classical dance and music known as Bharatanatyam. He is a 9th-generation descendant of a 200-year-old family of dancers and musicians from southern India. The dances are traditionally performed by women - Knight is unusually the first male of his family to take up this style of dance. His grandmother Balasaraswati was a celebrated and prolific dancer, Newsweek said she has been "recognized as the greatest Indian dancer of all time".

== Early life and family ==
Born on November 13, 1980, Aniruddha Knight spent his growing years both in India and the United States of America. His father is an American, Douglas Knight, who married into the family when he studied classical drumming on a South Indian mridangam at Wesleyan University, where Aniruddha's late grandmother T. Balasaraswati and her two musician brothers had taught since 1962. Aniruddha's childhood was an endless round of dancing. Initiated into the family's style of art by an aging Balasaraswati, Aniruddha's first formal lessons began at the age of six with mother Lakshmi, Balasaraswati's daughter.

== Training ==
A trained classical dancer, Aniruddha Knight brings intrinsic exposure to the varied nuances of Bharatnatyam and Carnatic Music. Traditionally Bharatanatyam was a way of life requiring complete devotion, and in the case of the Balasaraswatis, a performing family that completely embraced the art.

Having received intensive Bharatnatyam lessons as well as vocal training from his mother Lakshmi Knight, Aniruddha's classical music skills were further honed by T. Muktha and T. Viswanathan. Currently under the tutelage of Smt. Veghavahini, daughter of T. Brinda, for vocal music and the Veena, Aniruddha continues to take advanced lessons from Shyamala Mohan, one of Balasaraswati's key disciples.

== Career ==
Aniruddha Knight is the artistic director of Bala Music & Dance, a school of dancing in Middletown. His debut performance at the Jacob Pillow Festival (1997) in Massachusetts, began his career in the arts. He was featured in Newsweek magazine as one of 16 youngsters poised to re-shape India's future.

In 2008, he was chosen for the National Dance Project Grant, which recognized Bharatanatyam as a mainstream contemporary art form in the U.S. and covered a four-month tour across the United States.

In January 2012, Aniruddha founded the Balasaraswati Scripps Foundation in Chennai, India. Established as an offshoot of the Balasaraswati Performing Arts Centre, supported by the Samuel Scripps Foundation, it houses Louise Scripps’ collection of books, papers, articles and photographs on the history of dance as well as the Dhanammal school, which remains open to researchers.

== Grants and awards ==
Aniruddha Knight has been the recipient of several grants from the US government.

- New Jersey Council for the Arts 1997, 1999
- Asian Cultural Council - 1997, 2007
- The LEF Foundation- 2004, 2008
- National Endowment for the Arts 2005
- NEFA’s National Dance Project grant 2008
- New England Foundation for Arts 2011
