= Umayalpuram Mali =

Indian mridangam player

Umayalpuram Mali is an Indian mridangam player.

== Early life ==
His parents are Kalyani and Jayaraman. He learned the mridangam from Kumbakonam Rajappa Iyer and Umayalpuram Sivaraman. Kumbakonam Rajappa Iyer taught many mridangam players. The village Umayalpuram (Tamil Nadu, India) lies on the banks of the sacred Cauvery river, in between the holy towns Kumbakonam and Thiruvayaru. It has produced many musicians of repute. Krishna Baghavathar and Sundara Bagavathar who lived during the 19th century were the direct disciples of Saint Thyagaraja. Several laya vidwans were popular, followed by Sri Umayalpuram Sivaraman.

== Career ==
Umayalpuram Mali has accompanied various musicians during his career, including T. Muktha, T. Viswanathan, Veena S. Balachander, S. Kalyanaraman, Veena K. S. Narayanaswamy and Veena Ranganayaki Rajagopalan. Mali has provided mridangam accompaniment to composer Thanjavur Sankara Iyer on numerous occasions. He provided accompaniment to vidwans violin T.N. Krishnan, Trichur Ramachandran, Violin M. Chandrasekaran, T.N.Seshagopalan, T. V. Sankaranarayanan, O.S.Thyagarajan, Neyveli Santhanagopalan, Sudha Ragunathan, Vijay Siva, T.M. Krishna and others.

Mali participated in the programme "Rhythm Spectrum" conceived by his guru Sivaraman at the Music Academy, Chennai. The other participants were Mannargudi Easwaran, K.V. Prasad and Erode Nagaraj. He participated in the "Laya Vinyasam" programme in Manamadurai along with mridangam vidwans T. K. Murthy, Ramnad Raghavan and Tanjavur Ramadass.

Umayalpuram Mali toured widely and has performed in countries around the world and also on University assignments.

Mali was invited by Amherst College (Massachusetts, USA) to be a Scholar in Residence (2003). Mali was awarded the Copeland Fellowship (2006). Mali, in coordination with David Reck, conducted workshops and taught mridangam. He researched the topic of ‘The Role of Mridangam as an accompaniment in Carnatic Concerts'.

Harvard University invited him to be "Artiste in Residence" in 2010. Mali was awarded a Fulbright Fellowship in 2012 and invited to Harvard. With Prof Richard Wolf, Mail researched 'The art of Improvisation'. Mali taught Harvard students the art of the mridangam.

Mali released a CD titled Jack Wood that features Mali on mridangam and H. Subramaniam on Gethu Vadhyam. David Reck provided the lead music on the Veena.

Mali has trained several students, many of whom are in the concert scene.

== Recognition ==
Umayalpuram Mali won prizes and awards (‘Nadha Vallabha', ‘Kala Acharya Sironmani', ‘Kalaai Isai Sudaroli’ etc.) around the world. The Carnatic Association of Canberra, Australia bestowed upon him the title Kalaimani - Mridangam.
