= Bala (1976 film) =

1976 documentary by Satyajit Ray

- Title card of the film
- Directed by: Satyajit Ray
- Written by: Satyajit Ray
- Produced by: National Centre for the Performing Arts; Government of Tamil Nadu
- Starring: Balasaraswati; V. Raghavan; Uday Shankar; V. K. Narayana Menon
- Narrated by: Satyajit Ray
- Cinematography: Soumendu Roy
- Edited by: Dulal Dutta
- Music by: Satyajit Ray
- Distributed by: National Centre for the Performing Arts; Government of Tamil Nadu
- Release date: 1976
- Running time: 33 Minutes
- Country: India
- Language: English

Bala is a 1976 documentary film made by Satyajit Ray, about a Bharatanatyam dancer, Balasaraswati, fondly known as "Bala". The film was jointly produced by National Centre for the Performing Arts and Government of Tamil Nadu. The thirty-three-minute documentary features the life and some of the works by Balasaraswati in the form of narration and dance, starring herself. At the age of fourteen, Ray had seen a performance of Balasaraswati in Kolkata, then known as "Calcutta", in 1935, when she was seventeen years old.

Ray had initially planned to make a film on Bala in 1966, when she was in her prime, however he could not start filming until 1976. Though Bala was often called "a revolutionary Bharatanatyam dancer", she had never been filmed till she was 58 years old, in spite of having a career spanned over four decades. Ray decided to make the film on Bala, "the greatest Bharatanatyam dancer ever" according to him, to document her art for future generations with the "main value as archival". When Ray filmed the then 58-year-old Bala for the documentary, she wore the same pair of anklets which she had worn more than fifty years before for her debut performance, at the age of seven. Ray is reported to have said about the delayed filming of the documentary that "Bala filmed at 58 was better than Bala not being filmed at all."

The film's script was included in a book named Original English Film Scripts Satyajit Ray, put together by Ray's son Sandip Ray along with an ex-CEO of Ray Society, Aditinath Sarkar, which also included original scripts of Ray's other films.

== Background ==
Tanjore Balasaraswati, fondly known as Balasaraswati or Bala, was born on 13 May 1918 in Chennai, then known as Madras. Seven earlier generations of her family worked predominantly in dance and music, Bala started her Bharatanatyam training at the age of five, under Nattuvanar Kandappa Pillai and made her dancing debut in 1925, at the age of seven, at Kancheepuram at the Kamakshi Amman Temple. Her mother, Jayammal was a singer who encouraged Bala's musical training and was her accompanist in the dance concerts. Bala continued to do stage performance around the world along with her brothers, Mridangam player T. Ranganathan and flautist T. Viswanathan. Bala and her famous contemporary Rukmini Devi Arundale are often called as revolutionary Bharatanatyam dancers. She was awarded the second highest civilian honour given by the Government of India, the Padma Vibhushan, in 1977. Bala died on 9 February 1984, at the age of 65.

== Synopsis ==
The film begins with the introduction of Bharatanatyam since its inception. It also explains the various hand gestures, known as Mudra and Bala demonstrates one of them, "Mayura Mudra" ("Peacock Mudra"). Narrated by Satyajit Ray, the film describes Bala's lineage and her debut performance in 1925, at the age of seven, at Kancheepuram at the Kamakshi Amman Temple. A noted Sanskrit scholar and musicologist explains Bala's dancing style and an Indian dancer, Uday Shankar talks of his association with Bala.

The film then showcases Bala's "one of the most acclaimed" performance Krishna Ni Begane Baaro in the background of the ocean. It mentions that Bala got international acclaim through "The Festival of Arts, Edinburgh" in 1963, where other Indian artists also performed like Sitar player Ravi Shankar, classical vocalist M. S. Subbulakshmi and Sarod player Ali Akbar Khan. She performed eight solo recitals at the festival. The film showcases her daily routine with her brothers, Mridangam player T. Ranganathan and flautist T. Viswanathan, and her only daughter Lakshmi Knight, also a Bharatanatyam dancer.

The final segment of the film showcases Bala's solo performance of a pada varnam, which is based on Carnatic music, known as "raagamaalika" (garland of ragas). For this performance, Bala uses the same pair of anklets she had used for her debut performance at the age of seven.

== Credits ==
=== Cast ===
- Balasaraswati
- V. Raghavan
- Uday Shankar
- V. K. Narayana Menon

=== Crew ===
- Sound designer: S. P. Ramanathan, Sujit Sarkar, David
- Production designer: Anil Chowdhury, Bhanu Ghosh, R. Ramasi
- Laboratory Processing: Prasad Studios
- Eastmancolor: Gemini Color Lab
- Mixing: Mangesh Desai

=== Music ===
- K. Ramaiah (Nattuvanar)
- M. S. Ramadas (Vocal)
- T. Viswanathan (Flute)
- T. R. Murthy (Flute)
- V. Tyagarajan (Violin)
- T. Kuppuswamy (Mridangam)
- T. Janardan (Tambura)
- T. Ranganathan (Mridangam)

== Restoration ==
After the Academy of Motion Picture Arts and Sciences awarded Satyajit Ray an honorary Academy Award in 1992 for his lifetime achievements, the Academy Film Archive, part of the Academy Foundation which mainly works with the objectives as "preservation, restoration, documentation, exhibition and study of motion pictures", took an initiative to restore and preserve Ray's films. Josef Lindner was appointed as a preservation officer and as of October 2010 the Academy has successfully restored 19 titles. However, the Academy could not restore Bala yet as the negative of the film was not found.
