= DKJ =

DKJ can refer to:

- D. K. Jayaraman (1928–1991), singer of Carnatic music from India
- Dornakal Junction railway station, a train station near Dornakal, Andhra Pradesh, India
- Life care DKJ Hospital, a hospital in Villivakkam, a neighborhood of Chennai, Tamil Nadu, India
- De Kalb Junction, a bus stop in De Kalb Junction, New York State, US; see List of Amtrak stations#Thruway Motorcoach stations
- Jakarta Arts Council, which supports the Ismail Marzuki Park in Jakarta, Indonesia
- DKJ Memorial award, won by Carnatic music singer Kumbakonam M. Rajappa Iyer from India
- Jakarta is the official name of Special Region of Jakarta (Indonesian: Daerah Khusus Jakarta) abbreviated to DKJ
