= Nandini Ramani =

Indian Bharatanatyam exponent

- Born: 18 November 1950 (age 75); Tamil Nadu
- Occupation: Bharatanatyam dancer
- Parent: V. Raghavan
- Awards: Sangeet Natak Akademi Award

Nandini Ramani is a Bharatanatyam exponent, dance critic, Sanskrit drama actress cum director and academician from Chennai, India. She is the daughter of V. Raghavan, a Sanskrit scholar and musicologist. She received several awards, including the Sangeet Natak Akademi Award for overall contribution. She held several positions including the executive board member of the Sangeet Natak Akademi, member of the general council of the Indian Council for Cultural Relations, and the secretary of the Madras Music Academy.

== Biography ==
Ramani was born on 18 November 1950. Her Father V. Raghavan was a Sanskrit scholar and musicologist. She started learning Bharatanatyam at the age of five. She started acting in her father's Sanskrit plays when she was only nine.

Her guru in language and writing was her father Raghavan. Dancer Thanjavur Balasaraswathi and Nattuvanar K. Ganesan were her dance gurus, while B. Krishnamurthy and T. Muktha were her music gurus.

== Career ==
Ramani is a person who has contributed in various fields, including Bharatanatyam dancer, Sanskrit drama actress cum director, art critic, writer, publisher, columnist, and TV presenter.

In Bharatanatyam, Nandini is a follower of Bala tradition, known by her guru Balasaraswati. Her arangetram (first stage performance) was in 1970. During 1973-78 period, she taught Bharatanatyam at the Bala Saraswati School of Bharatanatyam under Madras Music Academy. She is also a Carnatic music singer and is one of the few dancers who can sing while dancing.

Ramani has performed at many venues in and outside India and has toured the Netherlands regularly. She has performed at venues such as The Tropical Institute, Amsterdam, and the Music Center, Utrecht.

Ramani, who taught many people through her own dance school established in the 1970s, has students even outside India, especially from the US, Canada, and the Netherlands.

Having learnt Sanskrit from her father, she produces and directs Sanskrit plays under the banner of 'Sanskrit Ranga' founded by her father. Nandini scripted and directed an episode of the 13-part series 'Kalathai Ventavar', which was aired on Doordarshan.

Ramani was a member of the Executive Board of the Sangeet Natak Akademi and is currently a member of the General Council of the Indian Council for Cultural Relations. She also served as the secretary of the Madras Music Academy.

== Awards and honors ==
- Sangeet Natak Akademi Award for her overall contribution to the performing arts and the 'Natya Padma' award from the Brahma Gana Sabha.
- In 2023 July, she received the Kartik Rajagopal Memorial Award.
- Nandini has also been honoured by giving titles like Natya Kala Sikhamani.
- Kalaimamani Award - 2018
