= Kumbakonam M. Rajappa Iyer =

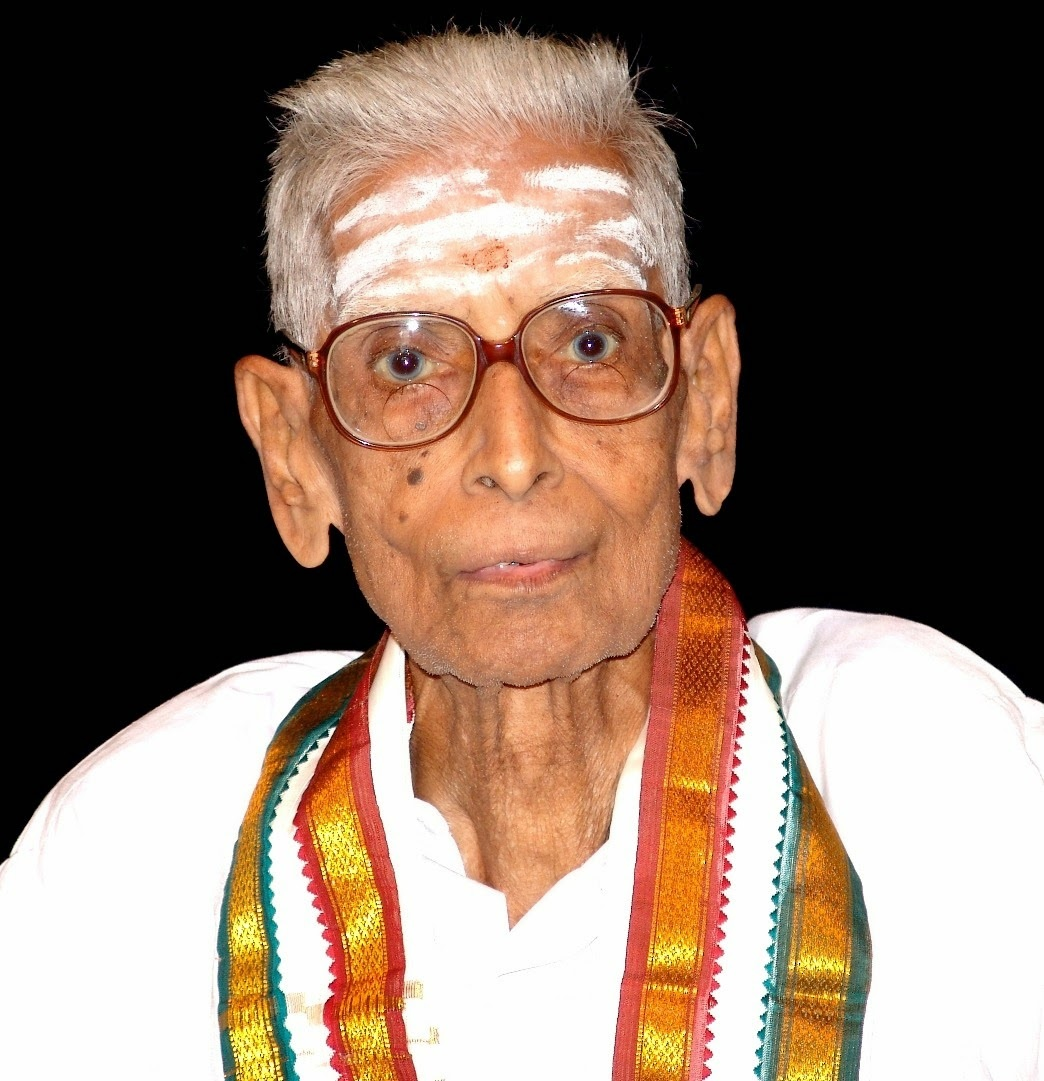

Background information
- Born: 8 October 1916; Kumbakonam, India
- Died: 5 March 2007 (aged 90)
- Genre: Indian classical
- Occupation: Mridanga Vidwan
- Instruments: Mridangam, Ghatam

Kumbakonam M. Rajappa Iyer was a Mridangam Vidwan in the field of Carnatic music from India. He was born in 1916 at Kumbakonam to Muthuswamy Iyer and Sitalakshmi Ammal.

== Early life ==
Rajappa Iyer underwent "Gurukulavasam" under Kumbakonam Alaga Nambi Pillai. After the demise of Pillai, Rajappa Iyer pursued a Mridangam education with Sakkottai Rangu Iyengar.

== Career ==
Rajappa Iyer accompanied on the mridangam and ghatam for stalwarts like Ariyakudi, Sivan, T. K. Rangachari, M. D. Ramanathan, Dr. Balamurali Krishna, Chittibabu, Lalgudi G Jayaraman, Ramani and many others apart from giving many lec-dems on mridangam and ghatam playing techniques. Rajappa Iyer formulated unique style of teaching in which the lessons were systematically arranged with a focus on fingering techniques. His style of Carnatic music is known as the "Rajappa Iyer School".

== Awards ==
Rajappa Iyer received many titles and honours:

- Layavadya Kovidha
- Nadha Kanal
- Mridanga Laya Mani
- Sangeetha Seva Niratha
- DKJ Memorial award
- TTK Memorial award
- Sangeetha Kala Acharya from Music Academy (2001)
- Asthana Vidwan - Kanchi Kamakoti Peetam

Layodaya celebrated the Birth Centenary Celebrations of Rajappa Iyer on 6–8 October 2016 at Vani Mahal.

== Disciples ==
Rajappa Iyer has taught many popular Mridangam players. His disciples include well known professional artistes on the mridangam and ghatam: K R Ganesh (Son), Srimushnam Raja Rao, Papanasam R Kumar, S R Jayaraman, V Sundaraghavan, K Ramakrishnan, Balashankar, Vilangudi V.Sivakumar, Venkataraman (Pune), Umayalpuram Mali, Umayalpuram V. Kalyanaraman, Palani Kumar, B. Ganapathiraman, Vijay Siva, Manoj Siva, Shriram Brahmanandham, V Kalyanaraman, Chrompet J Ganesh, Vijayaganesh, V Srinivasan, Madipakkam Murali, Adambakkam Shankar, Kalakkadu Srinivasan and Chromepet Suresh, Suryanarayanan, D Ramanathan, Komal R Srinivas.
