= Melaveedhi =

Melaveedhi, or Mela Veethi (West Main Street), is a neighbourhood in the town of Thanjavur in Tamil Nadu, India. Its PIN code is 614201.

The street is a part of the historic town which dates to the time of the Medieval Cholas and has temples dating from the time of the Cholas, the Thanjavur Nayaks and Thanjavur Marathas. The ancestors of the four brothers known popularly as the Thanjavur Quartet settled in Melaveedhi on land provided by the Maratha king Thulajaji.
