= K. P. Kittappa Pillai =

Indian choreographer and singer (1913–1999)

- Born: 5 May 1913
- Died: 1999 (aged 85–86)
- Father: K. Ponniah Pillai

K. P. Kittappa Pillai (5 May 1913 – 1999) was the son of Sangita Kalanidhi K. Ponniah Pillai (1888–1945), a scion of the famous Tanjore Quartet, codifiers of the Bharatanatyam format.

== Personal life ==
Kittappa Pillai was born into a nattuvanar family and was the fifth generation descendant of Sivanandam, one of the Thanjavur Quartet, and the grandson of the legendary Meenakshisundaram Pillai. Kittappa Pillai began his career as a vocalist having been trained by his own father, K. Ponniah Pillai and flourished in that sphere for some time. As a direct disciple of his maternal grandfather, the veteran Nattuvanar Pandanallur Meenakshi Sundaram Pillai, Kittappa Pillai established himself as a versatile Nattuvanar during the major part of his career. His father K. Ponniah Pillai, born 1888, should not be confused with his more famous namesake ancestor who was born in 1804.

== Tanjore Quartet heritage ==
The Quartet's heritage, preserved and expanded by the next eight generations of this family, remains a resource for traditional performers of the form to this day. Guru Kittappa Pillai himself revived many rare pieces of the original Tanjavur repertoire, producing the first annotated versions in the 1950s, including the Sarabhendra Bhupala Kuravanji and the Navasandhi Kavituvams.

He trained several students in India and from abroad, some of whom became prominent performers of the Thanjavur tradition. He was the great-great-grandson of one of the Thanjavur Quartets (Sivanandam).

== Awards and recognitions ==
Kittappa Pillai was associated as a faculty member in Tamizh Isai College and at Annamalai University.

He was honoured with several awards and titles during his lifetime which include:

- Sangeetha Nataka Academy Award (1974)
- Sangita Kala Acharya, (Music Academy, 1981)
- Isai Perarignar (Tamizh Isai Sangam, 1985)
- Kala Tilakam (Karnataka State Award, 1986)
- Kalidas Samman from Govt. of Madhya Pradesh
- Fellowship of the Central Sangeetha Nataka Academy (1999)

== Works ==
Kittappa Pillai has published works relating to the repertoire of his illustrious ancestors, the Tanjore Quartet. These include Ponniah Mani Malai, Thanjai Natya Isaikaruvoolam, Adi Bharatakala Manjari, Javalis of Chinnayya and Gana Kala Swarabhushani (along with his younger brother veena vidwan Sri K. P. Sivanandam). Among his other noteworthy contributions to the field of Bharatanatyam, are several rare dance compositions of the Quartet set to dance and Marathi compositions of Shahji Maharaja of Thanjavur in Bharatanatyam format.
