= Thrissur C. Rajendran =

Thrissur.C.Rajendran
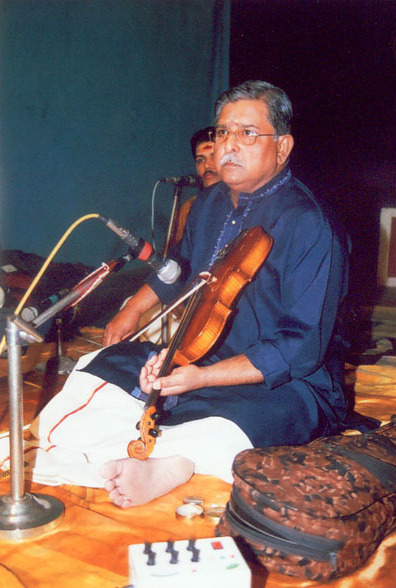
- Thrissur.C.Rajendran

Background information
- Born: 3 June 1949 (age 77)
- Origin: India
- Genre: Carnatic music
- Occupations: Violinist and composer
- Instrument: Violin
- Years active: 1964 to present

Thrissur C. Rajendran is a carnatic violinist from Kerala, India. His domain is enriching the raga bhava through musical embellishment. He is known for his non-domineering responses to the challenges posed by the artists he accompanies. He has composed classical items in addition to lyrics for light music.

== Early life ==
He was born in June 1949 to Venugopala Raja of Manakulam Palace and Sarojini.V.Raja. Rajendran inherited a legacy of performance art. He is the grandson of "Kakkad Karanavarppad", alias Manakulam Late Valiya Kunhunni Raja, the progenitor of the Temple of Performing Art of Kerala – "Kerala Kalamandalam".

He was initiated in the art of violin by late David Bhagavathar of Kunnamkulam. Rajendran has been an acknowledged performer since age 15.

Rajendran's younger brother, Trichur.C.Narendran, is a Top Grade Mridangam Artiste.

== Career ==
His career spans over five decades.

=== All India Radio ===
He was on the Staff of All India Radio from 1975 to June 2009. At AIR he served as a music composer, lyricist and broadcaster in the realm of spoken word items. He debuted by accompanying Palakkad. K.V.Narayanaswamy. His maiden performance in Doordarshan was by accompanying Pudukkode Krishnamoorthy.

== Recognition ==
In 1979 he won "Best Junior Violinist" award from Madras Music Academy. He later won the Kerala Sangeetha Nataka Akademi Award in 2006, "Sangeetha Thilakam" title by Thiruvambadi Devaswom, Thrissur, in 2005 and Kerala Statehood Award.

== Concerts ==
Rajendran travelled across India as an accompanist and soloist. He toured other countries supporting the legacy of Indian classical music. He was cultural ambassador at the UNESCO hall, Paris in connection with its 50th anniversary celebration. Rajendran performed at several centres in France.

His accompanied Chembai Vaidyanatha Bhagavathar, S. Ramanathan, D. K. Jayaraman, M. Balamuralikrishna, T.K.Govinda Rao, R. K. Srikantan, Nedunnuri Krishnamurthy, N. Ramani, T.V. Gopalakrishnan, Madurai.G. S. Mani, K. J. Yesudas, Neyyattinkara Vasudevan, T. N. Seshagopalan, T. V. Sankaranarayanan, Rudrapattanam Brothers and over three generations.

== Sources ==
- – KutcheriBuzz.com
- – The Hindu
