= Deivam =

- Poster
- Directed by: M. A. Thirumugam
- Written by: Sandow M. M. A. Chinnappa Thevar
- Produced by: Sandow M. M. A. Chinnappa Thevar
- Starring: Gemini Ganesan; K. R. Vijaya; Srikanth; Sowcar Janaki
- Edited by: M. A. Thirumugam
- Music by: Kunnakudi Vaidyanathan
- Production company: Dhandayuthapani Films
- Release date: 4 November 1972
- Running time: 139 minutes
- Country: India
- Language: Tamil

Deivam (transl. God) is a 1972 Indian Tamil-language devotional anthology film, starring Gemini Ganesan, R. Muthuraman, A. V. M. Rajan, Srikanth, K. R. Vijaya, Sowcar Janaki, Nagesh and Thengai Srinivasan. The film was edited and directed by M. A. Thirumugam and written by Sandow M. M. A. Chinnappa Thevar. It was released on 4 November 1972.

== Plot ==
The film serves as an anthology of stories that highlight the miracles performed by Hindu deity Muruga in the lives of his devotees in the present times which are narrated by Thirumuruga Kripananda Variyar.

First story

A thief (Major Sundarajan) comes to steal Muruga's jewels from the Arulmigu Thirumurugan Thirukovil, Marudhamalai. He loses the ability to use one of his legs. Later he reforms and repents his mistakes and he becomes a devotee and serves the temple. Later, a different thief comes to steal the temple collections. While fighting him off, he regains the use of his leg. Turns out that the thief was none other than Muruga himself who came to make him run and thereby regain his mobility.

Second story

Vellammal (Sowcar Janaki) is a lone wife whose husband has abandoned her who came to Swamimalai there she gets the contact of a banana vendor Nagesh and he gives her a job. Circumstances leads her to get into a fire accident where her husband Swaminathan (Srikanth), now a fire fighter, comes and saves her and their child thereby reuniting the family. Turns out that the husband got a prank call saying that the temple of Swamimalai is on fire where she ends up coming and there happens to be a fire accident in the slum she is residing. The Lord saves their child by hiding the baby behind a huge Swamimalai Muruga photo through which all three are united.

Third story

Kathirvelu (A.V.M. Rajan) and Vadivelu (V. Gopalakrishan) are friends. Vadivelu wants to start a business and needs fund. Both being staunch devotees of Muruga, Kathirvelu proceeds to give out the money without any promissory note with only Shanmugam (Thengai Sreenivasan) a camphor seller as a coincidental witness. The agreement goes like a 50-50 partnership with Kathirvelu's 50% going to the services of temple. After a few years, Vadivelu becomes immensely successful as well as greedy. He refuses to give the share meant for God. Kathirvelu, angry that Vadivelu has cheated God, applies a case on him. Without a note and Shanmugam dead in an accident, Vadivelu gloats. However, Shanmugam comes at the right time to the court, gives witness and helps to recover the money. It turns out that the Lord came in the form of Shanmugam and helped Kathirvelu.

Fourth story

Arumugam (Gemini Ganesan) and Valliyammal (K.R. Vijaya) are a merchant couple. Arumugam goes to join an investment scheme of his friend taking what is left of his family jewels which gets stolen by a gang. Arumugam disowns and just teases the God until his wife points out that his life was safe and the God saved his life. Unable to go to a wedding due to the abject and huge poverty they are now facing, neighbours give Valliyammal their jewels for safe keeping and approve using it for going to the wedding in Tiruchendur. The same gang of thieves attack Valliyammal but get caught by police this time due to a power cut, thanks to minor miracles performed by Lord and all the jewels are restored to the family. The friend who Arumugam was going to join turns out to be scammers who planned to dupe Arumugam. Thus, Tiruchendur Muruga saved the family.

Fifth story

Mani (R. Muthuraman) and his best friend Kumaresan (Senthamarai) are polar opposites when it comes to faith in God. Senthamarai is a staunch devotee of Thiruparankundaram Murugan who visits the God's marriage every year, who tells him that background where he needed some money to save his wife's life. He found a cigarette pack with the exact amount he needs and that is how he became a devotee of the lord and visits every year on the marriage day of the lord. Circumstantially, Mani gets into a spot where he owes money failing which he would lose his respect which he values above his life. He prays to Muruga as a last resort. He too finds a cigarette pack but it is empty. He gives up saying though his prayer was sincere, his faith probably wasn't. A vehicle pushes him off-road and he falls down a slope. He scolds Muruga. At the same time, another vehicle in the accident scene drops off a suitcase due to the minor skirmish on the road. The suitcase contains Rs.25,000. He takes it to the police station to find the owner. The owner is there and thanks him profusely for returning such a huge amount. He offers him a reward but Mani insists on taking a loan of the required amount to save his respect and thanks the God understanding that only after being tested and put through trouble, both times at which he called the God even if it was for scolding/complaining, God gave him what he wanted.

Sixth story

Subramaniyam (Sivakumar) and Deivanai (Jaya) are a couple who are devoted to the lord. At a visit to the temple, A rogue (S. A. Ashokan) first harasses Deivanai and tries to molest her after hurting Subramaniyam. However, Muruga comes in the form of his vahanas and saves them.

== Cast ==
Lead actors

- Sivakumar as Subramaniyam
- Jaya as Deivaanai, Subramaniyam's wife
- Gemini Ganesan as Arumugam
- K. R. Vijaya as Valliyammai, Arumugan's wife
- S. V. Ramadoss as Robber's head
- S. A. Ashokan as a Rogue
- Major Sundararajan as Kanthappan, a thief
- R. S. Manohar as Kanthappan's partner
- A. V. M. Rajan as Kadhirvelu
- V. Gopalakrishan as Vadivelu
- Thengai Srinivasan as Shanmugam
- R. Muthuraman as Mani
- Senthamarai as Kumaresan
- Srikanth as Swaminathan
- Sowcar Janaki as Velammai, Swaminathan's wife
- Nagesh as banana vendor

Special appearance (actors)

- V. S. Raghavan as a businessman
- S. N. Lakshmi as Valliyammai's neighbour
- K. Kannan as guest

Special appearances (singers)

- T. M. Soundararajan as a devotional singer
- Sirkazhi Govindarajan as a devotional singer
- Madurai Somu as an opera singer
- Pithukuli Murugadas as a devotional singer
- Radha Jayalakshmi as an opera singer
- Soolamangalam Rajalakshmi as an opera singer
- M. R. Vijaya as an opera singer
- Bangalore A. R. Ramani Ammal as an opera singer

== Production ==
K. R. Vijaya initially refused to act in the film since she did not want to continue her acting career after giving birth, but accepted after her husband advised her against quitting. The song "Thiruchendoorin Kadalorathil Senthilnaathan" was shot at Thiruchendur during the great "Kandha Shasti Festival" which happens only once a year and some shots where shot when a special diety of Lord Muruga as "Shanmugar", "Arumuga Nainar" comes out of temple, it commonly named as "Shanmugar Yetram" which also happens only twice in a year Aavani & Masi months in Tamil Calendar. The film was shot at the six Abodes of Murugan while also capturing different festivals celebrated at those abodes.

== Soundtrack ==
Music was by Kunnakudi Vaidyanathan and lyrics were by Kannadasan. The song "Maruthamalai Maamaniye" is set in the Carnatic raga known as Darbari Kanada.

Songs	Singer	Length
"Maruthamalai Maamaniye"	Madurai Somu	6:28
"Naadariyum 100 Malai Naan Ariven"	Pithukuli Murugadas	4:12
"Varuvaandi Tharuvaandi Malayaandi"	Soolamangalam Rajalakshmi & M. R. Vijaya	4:27
"Thiruchendoorin Kadalorathil Senthilnaathan"	T. M. Soundararajan, Seerkazhi Govindarajan	4:59
"Kundarathile Kumarakukku Kondattam"	Bangalore A. R. Ramani Ammal	2:28
"Thiruchendooril Poar Purindhu"	Radha Jayalakshmi	5:05

== Release and reception ==
Deivam was released on 4 November 1972. Kanthan of Kalki praised Thirumugam's direction and editing, along with Vaidyanathan's music.
