= Nagmani =

Nagmani or Nagamani may refer to:

- Nagamani or Snake-stone, stone used as folk medicine for snake bites
- Nagmani (magazine) (1966–2002), Punjabi literary magazine by Amrita Pritam
- Nagmani Kushwaha (born 1953), Indian politician from Bihar and Jharkhand
- Nagamani Srinath (born 1950), Indian Carnatic music vocalist

== See also ==
- Naag Muni, Pakistani film
- Naga (snake)
- Mani Jewel
