= Ranganayaki Ammal =

First Indian female percussionist who broke the gender barrier

Ranganayaki Ammal (28 May 1910 – 15 August 1998) was an Indian Mridangam player. She was the first to break the gender barrier and became the first Indian female percussionist.

== Family ==
Ranganayaki Ammal's father, Thirukokarnam Sivaraman, was renowned as a distinguished natuvanar. He was celebrated for his mastery of avadhana pallavis, an art form that involves skillfully playing diverse talas using not only his hands but also his legs and head. Ranganayaki Ammal was the second child in a family of seven siblings. Ulaganathan Pillai, her brother was a violinist.

=== Training ===
Ranganayaki embraced the art of mridangam and sought guidance from the renowned Pudukottai Dakshinamurthy Pillai, while simultaneously pursuing her training in Bharatanatyam.

== Achievements ==
In the early 20th century, she became a trailblazing woman in the male-dominated field of Carnatic percussion. In the 1927 All India music conference in Madras, a significant moment was the inclusion of 17-year-old Thirukokarnam Ranganayaki Ammal as the only female among the 23 mridangam artists performing at the event.

Ranganayaki Ammal was a distinguished Mridangam player. Despite her significant contributions to music, Ranganayaki remained largely unnoticed, with the exception of being honored with the prestigious Kalaimamani award, the highest civilian award presented by the state of Tamil Nadu. She died on 15 August 1998.
