= Thyagaraja Mangalam =

Janya raga of Carnatic music

- Arohanam: S G₂ M₁ P N₃ Ṡ
- Avarohanam: Ṡ N₃ D₂ P M₁ G₂ R₂ S

Thyagaraja Mangalam is a rāgam in Carnatic music(musical scale of South Indian classical music) created by music composer Mahesh Mahadev. Named after Carnatic vocalist and musicologist T. M. Thyagarajan. It is the Janya raga of 23rd Melakarta rāgam Gowri Manohari in the 72 melakarta rāgam system of Carnatic music.

The Western equivalent is the jazz minor scale but the second and sixth note is omitted in ascending.

There is no equivalent rāgam in Hindustani music.

== Structure and Lakshana ==
Descending is same as Gourimanohari scale with Shadjam at C

Thyagaraja Mangalam is an asymmetric rāgam that does not contain rishabham or dhaivatam in the ascending scale. It is an audava-sampurna rāgam (or owdava rāgam, meaning pentatonic ascending scale). Its ārohaṇa-avarohaṇa structure (ascending and descending scale) is as follows.

- ārohaṇa: S G₂ M₁ P N₃ Ṡ (Note: Alternate notations: Hindustani: S G̱ M P N Ṡ; Western: C E♭ F G B C)
- avarohaṇa: Ṡ N₃ D₂ P M₁ G₂ R₂ S (Note: Alternate notations: Hindustani: Ṡ N D P M G̱ R S; Western: C B A G F E♭ D C)

The notes used in this scale are shadjam, sadharana gandharam, shuddha madhyamam, panchamam and kakali nishadham in ascending scale and chatushruti rishabham and chatushruti daivatam added in descending scale. It is a audava - sampurna rāgam

== Compositions ==
The composition in this rāgam

Dhyana Moolam - Viruttam
