= Jon B. Higgins =

American singer

- Born: Jon Borthwick Higgins; September 18, 1939; Andover, Massachusetts
- Died: December 7, 1984 (aged 45)
- Instrument: Vocals

Jon Borthwick Higgins (September 18, 1939 – December 7, 1984), also known in India as Higgins Bhagavatar, was an American musician, scholar, and teacher known principally for his rare skill as a non-Indian in the field of Carnatic music.

== Early life and education ==
Born in Andover, Massachusetts, Higgins had his high school education at Phillips Academy, where his father taught English and his mother taught music for many years. He attended Wesleyan University and received all three of his degrees from there: A B.A. as a double major in music and history in 1962, an M.A. in musicology in 1964, and a Ph.D. in ethnomusicology in 1973.

== Career ==
He founded the Indian music studies program at York University in Toronto with Trichy Sankaran in 1971, and returned to Wesleyan in 1978 as a professor of music and director of the Center for the Arts. He continually sought to strengthen the quality of Wesleyan's curriculum, and immersed himself in numerous cultural activities inside and beyond the university community.

Higgins was a singer of European and Western classical music. He is also recognized as the first non-Indian to perform South Indian classical Carnatic music at a high level of proficiency. He began his Indian music studies in Wesleyan courses taught by Robert E. Brown and T. Ranganathan, and was quickly captured by the subtle beauty of the art form. He decided to fully dedicate himself to learning the language of Carnatic music, and went to India on a Fulbright scholarship to learn from Ranganathan's brother, T. Viswanathan. Within a short period of time he performed to great acclaim at the Tyagaraja Aradhana, an important music festival in South India. He later continued his studies under their sister, renowned dancer T. Balasaraswati, and wrote his dissertation on the dance music of bharatanatyam. Higgins returned to India as a senior research fellow of the American Institute of Indian Studies.

He continued to perform Carnatic music, recorded several albums, and due to his widely recognized sensitivity was honored with the sobriquet "Bhagavatar" (scholarly musician). When he visited the Udupi Shri Krishna Temple, he was denied entry because of his white skin by those who managed the temple. He stood at the gate and sang in chaste Kannada the Vyasatirtha composition ‘Krishna nee begane baro’, an action which echoed Kanaka Dasa's protest in the 16th century. He was eventually permitted entry, possibly to avert an 'intervention from the deity', that Kanaka Dasa's legend spoke of.

Although he mostly won the acceptance of the general Indian public during katcheris (concerts), there were some critics of his times who pointed out minor errors in pronunciation. This did not deter Higgins, who went on to deliver katcheri broadcasts on All India Radio.

== Death ==
Higgins was killed after being struck by a hit-and-run driver near his home in Middletown, Connecticut. The Connecticut state police arrested Thomas Knight of Middlefield, Conn. and charged him with second-degree manslaughter with a motor vehicle while intoxicated. Higgins was planning to perform in South Africa in protest against its then racist apartheid regime.

He is survived by his wife, Rhea Kyvele Padis; two sons, Luke and Nicholas, an ethnomusicologist at Sarah Lawrence College, and a brother, Hayden, a jazz pianist known professionally as Eddie Higgins.

== Legacy ==
Higgins was much appreciated by Carnatic music connoisseurs across the world. His rendition of "Endaro Mahanubhavulu, Andariki Vandanamulu", a famous kriti (composition) by Śri. Śri. Thyagaraja Swamý (an important composer of Carnatic music), was extraordinary considering the fact that it is a difficult kriti for even the people with knowledge of the Telugu language in which it is composed. Other of Higgins' celebrated renditions include "Siva Siva Anarada", "Krishna Nee Begane", and "Kaa Vaa Vaa", and "Amma Ravamma".

Composer Terry Riley has credited a South Indian singing demonstration by Jon Higgins as an influence on his piece A Rainbow in Curved Air from 1969.

Pioneering experimental composer Alvin Lucier wrote In memoriam Jon Higgins : for clarinet in A and slow sweep pure wave oscillator in 1984 as a tribute to Higgins.

== Bibliography ==
- Higgins, Jon B. (1964). "An Analysis of Some Principles of South Indian Drumming, Based on the Bharata śabda vādya pradāyini by K. Muniswami. M.A. thesis. Middletown, Connecticut: Wesleyan University.
- Higgins, Jon B. (1968). "An American in Madras." Asian Music, v. 1, no. 1 (Winter 1968–69), pp. 4–11.
- Higgins, Jon B. (1973). The Music of Bharata Nāṭyam. Ph.D. dissertation. 2 volumes. Middletown, Connecticut: Wesleyan University.
