= V. K. Narayana Menon =

Indian musicologist (1911–1997)

- Born: 1911
- Died: 1997 (aged 85–86)
- Occupation: classical Indian dancer
- Awards: Padma Bhushan in 1969

V. K. Narayana Menon (Thrissur Vadakke Kurupath Narayana Menon) (1911–1997) was a scholar of Indian classical dance and classical music. He was one of the prominent art critics of India and a Sangeet Natak Akademi Fellowship.

== Education and career ==
Menon was born in Thrissur city of Kerala, in the famous Vadakke Kurupath family. He started his career as BBC Music program producer. Later he became the Director General of the same. He had held important positions in art institutions and broadcasting centres of India. He was deputy director of All India Radio. He was the secretary of Sangeet Natak Akademi, New Delhi- supreme centre for art, music and dance of Government of India. He was the President of National Centre for the Performing Arts- Bombay etc. During these tenures he promoted various arts and artists.

He was noted for his writings about Classical Indian dance and music, and wrote many articles and books on the subject. He was considered one of the finest Indian art critic. Kerala: A profile, Balasaraswati (about the life of great Bharatanatyam dancer Balasaraswati), The Communication Revolution, The Language of Music, Development of William Butler Yeats are some of his works. He used to write columns regularly in esteemed magazines like Illustrated Weekly of India and newspapers.

Indian government honoured him by the Padma Bhushan in 1969 and the Sangeet Natak Akademi Fellowship in 1980.

He was married to the daughter of Rabindranath Tagore's brother.

== See also ==
- Mani Madhava Chakyar
