= Radha Namboodiri =

Indian Carnatic vocalist (born. 1946)

- Born: Radha Warrier; 14 January 1946 (age 79); Mumbai, British India
- Occupation: Singer
- Awards: Sangeet Natak Akademi Award (2021)
- Musical career
- Genres: Carnatic music
- Instrument: Vocals

Radha Namboodiri (born 1946) is an Indian classical vocalist and music teacher from Mumbai, Maharashtra. In 2021 she received Sangeet Natak Akademi Award by Sangeet Natak Akademi, Government of India.

== Biography ==
Radha P. Namboodiri was born on 14 January 1946, to A.R. Warrier and Narayani in Mumbai, Maharashtra. It was on the advice of her sister's music teacher that her parents decided to give her musical training. She did Bachelor of Arts in English Literature and Sanskrit from the University of Mumbai.

Radha worked with All India Radio, Thiruvananthapuram as program executive for music in 1975 and later transferred to Doordarshan. She served as director of Doordarshan, Thiruvananthapuram till 1999 and director of central sales unit, All India Radio, Mumbai from 2002 to 2006.

Radha, who started her musical training in 1960 under T. V. Ramamurthy of Mumbai, did advanced training under eminent Carnatic musicians like Semmangudi Srinivasa Iyer, T. M. Thiagarajan, and T. Brinda before joining Sangita Vidwan course at the then Central College of Carnatic music, Adyar. She received a scholarship from the Department of Culture, Government of India for her training under Semmangudi.

=== Personal life ===
Radha is married to Purushothaman Namboodiri and they have one daughter.

== Career ==
Radha has performed in various venues across the country, written articles on music in various newspapers and magazines and also conducted many seminars and workshops on Carnatic music in India and abroad.

Other than working with All India Radio and Doordarshan, Radha has also worked with Sri Shanmukhananda Bharatiya Sangeetha Mahavidyalaya, under the University of Mumbai as Director-Principal during the period 2006–2017. She also served as the editor of Shanmukha, the cultural journal of Sri Shanmukhananda Fine Arts and Sangeetha Sabha, Mumbai.

== Awards and honors ==
In 2021 Radha received the Sangeet Natak Akademi Award for her contribution to Carnatic vocal music. She was also honoured with the titles including Sangita Kala Acharya by the Madras Music Academy, Dr. M.S. Subbulakshmi Sangeetha Pracharya by the Sri Shanmukhananda Fine Arts & Sangeetha Sabha, and the Sangeetha Bhooshana given by Sriranjani Sangeetha Sabha, Mumbai.
