= Chittoor Subramaniam Pillai =

Indian carnatic musician (1898 – 1975)

Chittoor Subramanya Pillai
- Born: Chittoor Subramanyam; 22 June 1898
- Origin: Punganur, Chittoor district, India
- Died: 18 October 1975 (aged 77)
- Genres: Indian Classical Music
- Occupations: musician, singer, lyricist
- Years active: 1915–1975

Chittoor Subramanyam (22 June 1898 – 18 October 1975) was an Indian carnatic musician. He received the Sangeeta Kalanidhi award in 1954, and the Sangeet Natak Akademi award in 1964.

== Early life ==
Chittoor Subramanyam was born to Perayya and S. Mogilamma, on 22 June 1898 in a village near Punganur in Palamaner taluk, Chittoor district, Andhra Pradesh. A distinguished votary of laya, Chittoor Subramanyam Pillai received his initial musical training under his father, who was a violinist. By age 7, he was well versed in Carnatic Music. He later became a disciple of Kanchipuram Naina Pillai. Under Naina Pillai's tutelage, Subramanyam learned and honed his skills by doing Gurukula seva to his Guru (teacher/master) for more than two decades.

From the age of five, Subramnayam was performing Harikathas (musical renditions of mythology) and music performances. He completed his training with Pillai when he was aged 20 and began his major performances.

== Professional career ==
Chittoor Subramanyam settled in Madras (now Chennai) but performed throughout India during a career lasting over 50 years.

He was well known for his repertoire of Thyagaraja Keerthanas (compositions) and mastery of Laya (rhythm). He had his own style called 'Kancheepuram School'. He was popular in Swaraprasthanam and Kalapramanam, noted for singing very rare keerthanas of Thyagaraja, Muthuswamy Dikshitar and other composers.

At a time when recording technology was in its infancy, his two discs for Columbia Records, which contained his own compositions such as Madhura Nagarilo Challanamma Bonu, Kulamulona Golladana and Mavallagadamma – demonstrated his originality as a composer and lyricist.

He realised the need to spread the art and taught disciples through the Gurukulam tradition. Many of Chittoor Subramanyam's disciples became well-known carnatic musicians. These include Madurai Somasundaram, Bombay S Ramachandran, Chittoor Ramachandran, T. T. Seetha, Tadepalli Lokanatha Sarma, Revathy Ratnaswamy and Kovi Manisekaran He started the Saint Thyagaraja Utsavam (annual music festival) in Tirupathi and awarded the title of Sapthagiri Sangeetha Vidwanmani to deserving exponents of carnatic music.

While in Tirupati, he composed music for a number of kirthanas of Saint Annamacharya. Noted among them are – 'Ithadokade', 'Narayanathe'

Recognised as an ambassador for Carnatic music, he died in 1975. To commemorate his birth centenary, the annual Subramanya Sangeetha Kalakshetra was established and a three-day festival of music was held in Hyderabad.

== Official posts ==
He was Head of the Music Department at Annamalai University and was connected with the music boards and committees of various other universities in South India as well as state and central government bodies. Among his official positions were

- Principal, Sri Venkateswara College of Music and Dance, Tirupati;
- Professor of Music, The Central College of Music, Madras;
- Principal, The Raja's College of Music, Thiruvayar;
- Principal, The Ramanathan Music Academy, Jaffna, Ceylon (now Sri Lanka)(1967–1971)

== Awards ==
Subramanyam received various awards. These included:

- Sangeetha Kalanidhi, in 1954, by Music Academy, Madras (now Chennai)
- Sangeet Natak Akademi Award, in 1964 by Sangeet Natak Akademi, India's National Academy of Music, Dance & Drama.
- Sangeetha Kalasikhamani Award, in 1964 by The Indian Fine Arts Society, Chennai
- Gana Kala Prapoorna, by A.P. Sangeetha Nataka Academy
- Swara Chakravarthi,
- Laya Brahma,
- Isai Perarignar, by Tamil Isai Sangam, Madras (now Chennai)
- Sapthagiri Sangeetha Vidwanmani, by Thyagarja Utsavam Committee, Tirupathi
- Isai Mannar
