= Veenai Dhanammal =

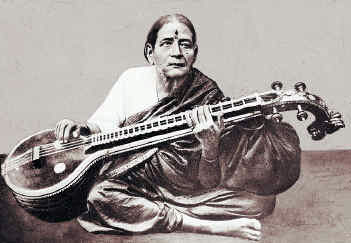
- Veenai Dhanammal, circa mid-1930s

Background information
- Born: 1867; Madras, Madras Presidency, British India (now Chennai, Tamil Nadu, India)
- Died: 1938 (aged 70–71)
- Genres: Indian classical music
- Occupation: Veenai player
- Instrument: Veenai
- Years active: 1880–1938

Veenai Dhanammal (Tamil: வீணை தனம்மாள்) (1867–1938) was a highly accomplished Carnatic musician, and the torchbearer of the school of Carnatic music that goes by her name. She was both a vocalist and a performer on the Saraswati veena. The prefix "Veenai" in her name is an indicator of her exceptional mastery of that instrument.

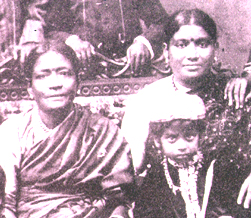
Veenai Dhanammal (left) with her daughter T. Lakshmirathnam and grandson, circa 1910–15.

== Early life and background ==
Dhanammal was born into a family of professional musicians and dancers in George Town, Madras (now Chennai), the capital city of the erstwhile Madras Presidency of British India in 1867. Her grandmother Kamakshi was a reputed dancer, and her mother was a vocalist who trained under Subbaraya Sastri, the son of Syama Sastri of the Carnatic music composer trinity.Veena Dhanammal was a devadasi, her family also has this background, with a deep tradition of Indian classical music.In addition to training by her family members, Dhanammal also learned from Walajapet Balakrishna Das ("Padam Baladas"), a blind musician who was a repository of the padams of Kshetrayya, and Satanur Pancanatha Iyer.

== Career ==
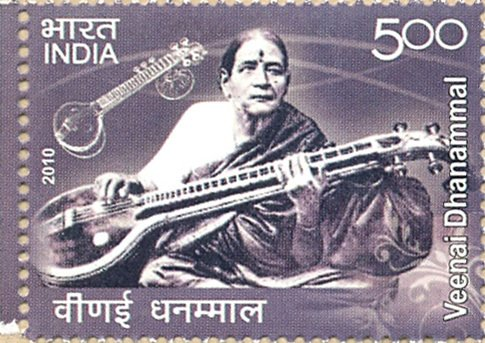
A commemorative postage stamp of her issued on 03-December-2010

"Regarding the veenai as an instrument complete and perfect in itself, she played it without plectrum, and often accompanied by her own singing. Her music is documented in a set of historical recordings. Her personal style, known as the ''Veenai Dhanammal bani'', is regarded as a yardstick in terms of adherence to traditional values and profoundity of music expression. Musicians, critics and composers attended her private recitals in Chennai. Her continuing impact is ascribed to the scope of her repertoire, knowledge and refinement. Many songs by leading composers like Narasimhacarlu, Mutialpet Ponnusvami, Tiruvottriyur Tyagayyar, and especially Dharmapuri Subbarayar were composed for, or inspired by, Dhanammal. These compositions, mainly javali and padam, have been preserved, taught, and published by her grandchildren, T. Brinda, T. Muktha, T. Sankaran, dancer T. Balasaraswati, and flute player T. Viswanathan." Her daughters Lakshmiratnam (mother of AIR Deputy Director T Sankaran), Jayammal (mother of Balasaraswati, T Ranganathan, and T Viswanathan) and Kamakshi (mother of Brinda, Mukta and Abhiramasundari) were also performing musicians and teachers. Of her four daughters, Rajalakshmi was the oldest, Lakshmiratnam the next, Jayammal was the third oldest and Kamakshi was the youngest. Three of her grandchildren (Brinda, Balasaraswathi, Vishwanathan) were awarded Sangeetha Kalanidhi title. Dhanammal's grandson T. Sankaran (not to be confused with musician Trichy Sankaran) was both an officer at AIR and director of Tamil Isai Sangham; he was also a singer who used to perform for the radio in 1930s. Music performed by Dhanammal, Jayammal, and several of Dhanammal's grandchildren and great-grandchildren is available on the internet.

Dhanammal's fame had spread far and wide, and even Abdul Karim Khan, doyen of Kirana Gharana in Hindusthani Music, learnt Carnatic songs from her and released discs of these. She both taught Naayana Pillai her music and learnt from him, in a mutual give and take.

A commemorative postage stamp on her was issued on 03-December-2010.

== Sources ==
- SubbaRao, T. V. Studies in Indian Music, Asia Publishing House, London, 1962.
- Ayyangar, R. R. History of South Indian (Carnatic) Music, Published by the author, Madras, 1972.
- Pesch, Ludwig. The Illustrated Guide to South Indian Classical Music, New Delhi: Oxford University Press, 1999. ISBN 978-0-19-564382-4.
