= Movva =

- Village
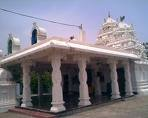
- Muvva Gopala Temple
- Interactive map of Movva
- Location in Andhra Pradesh, India
- Coordinates: 16.225°N 80.915°E
- Country: India
- State: Andhra Pradesh
- District: Krishna

Area
  - Total: 15.46 km^{2} (5.97 sq mi)

Population (2011)
  - Total: 5,653
  - Density: 583/km^{2} (1,510/sq mi)

Languages
  - Official: Telugu
- Time zone: UTC+5:30 (IST)
- PIN: 521135
- Telephone code: 08671
- Vehicle registration: AP

Movva is the name of a well-known village in the Krishna district of the Indian state known as Andhra Pradesh. It is located in 'Movva mandal of Machilipatnam revenue division'. It is one of the villages in the mandal to be a part of Andhra Pradesh Capital Region.

It is the hometown of the famous 17th century Telugu poet Kshetrayya (c.1600-80). In fact, Kshetrayya was so much attached to his native village and the Krishna deity of the main temple here that his 'nom de plume' or Mudra(signature), which appears towards the end of every composition written by him, is "Muvva Gopala".

The village is known for its government educational institutions such as SMK Zilla Parishad High School, Kshetrayya junior college, VSR Degree and PG college. Kuchipudi, one of the villages in Movva Mandal is well known for the dance.

== See also ==
- Villages in Movva mandal
