= T. Ranganathan =

Indian musician.(1925–1987)

Tanjore Ranganathan
- Born: Tanjore Ranganathan; 13 March 1925; Chennai, India
- Died: 22 December 1987 (aged 62) Middletown, Connecticut, USA
- Known for: karnatic music - drumming

Tanjore Ranganathan (13 March 1925 – 22 December 1987) was an Indian American Carnatic musician specializing in percussion instruments, particularly the mridangam, having studied under Palani Subramaniam Pillai.

Ranganathan began performing professionally in 1938. At the California Institute of the Arts and Wesleyan University he taught many non-Indians Carnatic music, including Robert E. Brown, John Bergamo, Jon B. Higgins, Douglas Knight, David Nelson, Royal Hartigan, David Moss, Glenn "Rusty" Gillette, and Craig Woodson. He began teaching at Wesleyan in 1963, becoming that university's first Artist in Residence in Music.

Ranganathan's younger brother was the Carnatic flute player and vocalist T. Viswanathan (1927-2002). The two recorded the music for the Satyajit Ray documentary film Bala (1976), about their elder sister, the bharatanatyam dancer Balasaraswati.

The American composer Henry Cowell composed the mridangam part in his Madras Symphony especially for T. Ranganathan.

Ranganathan was married to his wife Edwina and had two sons, Suddhama and Arun. He died after a long illness at the age of 62.

== See also ==
- Ramnad Raghavan
- S. Ramanathan
