= Pithukuli Murugadas =

Indian devotional singer

- Born: Balasubramanian; 25 January 1920; Coimbatore, Tamilnadu
- Died: 17 November 2015 (aged 95)
- Occupation: Singer
- Parent(s): Sundaram Iyer, Alamelu

Pithukuli Murugadas (25 January 1920 – 17 November 2015) was a devotional singer from Tamil Nadu, India. He was best known for his compositions on the Hindu deity Murugan.

== Life ==
Pithukuli Murugadas was born as Balasubramanian in Coimbatore to Alamelu and Sundaram Iyer in a devout Tamil Brahmin family. At the age of seven, he went to practice yoga in Palani under the tutelage of Nadayogi Brahmananda Paradesiar. He was also called "Pittukuli" by his teacher. In 1931, at the age of eleven, he participated in the Salt Satyagraha campaign and spent some days in prison. During 1936, while participating in the nationwide Satyagraha to protest against the Jalianwalla Bagh massacre, he was imprisoned for six months. He lost his vision in one eye due to severe police atrocities. He was released later, as a governmental gesture on the occasion of the wedding of Mysore Maharaja Jayachamarajendra Wadiyar.

In 1935, at the age of 15, he relinquished his house and started his pilgrimage. He began wandering around the country. In 1939, he visited Swami Ramdas and Mata Krishnabai of Anandashram. He was named as Murugadas by Swami Ramdas as he sang to Lord Murugan. In 1940, he spent a few days with Avadhudha Swami Swayam Prakash at Sendhamangalam and then went on a pilgrimage by foot and traveled throughout India. He learnt various renderings of Brahmananda Paradesiar and Ramana Maharishi.

In 1946, he joined Thirupugazh Mani in popularizing bhajans praising Muruga. After the Indian Independence Act 1947, he became the patron of the orphanage known as Dhinabandhu Ashram at Walajapet. Remaining a bachelor until the age of 58 in 1978, he married Devi Saroja (b. 1936), who was an accomplished artiste in dance, music, Tala Vadya, and painting. Saroja used to accompany his concerts for a long period, and predeceased him in 2011. Murugadas died on Kanda Sashti Day, 17 November 2015, aged 95.

== Awards ==
- Sangeetha Samrat (1956) by Swami Sivananda
- Kalaimamani (1984) by Government of Tamil Nadu
- Guru Surajananda Award (1989)
- Madhura Gana Mamani (1994)
- Sangeetha Nataka Academy Award (1998)
- Thiagarajar Award by The National Cultural Organization of New Delhi

== Links ==
- Murugadas - Hinduism Today
- Notable compositions by Murugadas - Raaga.com
- Pithukuli Murugadas website
