= Kanchipuram Naina Pillai =

Indian musician

Naina Pillai (1887–1934), born Kanchipuram Subrahmaniam Pillai, was an Indian musician. Though Naina is a feminine name, he was called 'naayana' but spelled 'naina'; and his real name was anyway Subrahmaniam. As a performer, he got the nickname 'Naina'. While record keeping in rural areas of India was poor, and often unreliable, Naayana Pillai's date of birth is believed to be 25 July 1887, and the date of death is believed to be 2 May 1934.

== Playing style ==
His mother Kamakshi was a disciple of a descendant of Syama Sastri, but Naina did not show much interest in music at a young age. The real turning point in his life was at the concert of Konerirajapuram Vaidyanatha Iyer. He became adept at handling kritis. But Naayana Pillai was accused of excesses as well because he often failed to respect the concert times allocated to him. Once he overshot the allotted time of two hours at Madras Music Academy by so much that the next artist, Vishnu Digambar Paluskar, went up the stage and had Naina Pillai physically removed.

Dhanakoti Ammal was one of the earliest musicians to record music for 78 rpm, as early as 1904-1905. She (Dhanakoti) and Naina Pillai's mother Kamakshi were sisters. Naina Pillai learned music from aunt Dhanakoti as well. T Brinda's mother was also named Kamakshi; these two Kamakshi-s were different women.

== Disciples ==
Kanchipuram Naina Pillai made a name as a great teacher. Many of his disciples - sisters T. Brinda and T.Muktha, D. K. Pattammal, Chittoor Subramaniam Pillai - became prominent names in Carnatic music.

The street where Naina Pillai lived was named after him after his death.
