= Shankar Mahadevan Academy =

Music Academy

- Type: Public; Online Music Academy
- Established: 2010
- Founder: Sridhar Ranganathan
- Location: Palo Alto; Bangalore India
- Website: Official Website

The Shankar Mahadevan Academy is a music academy founded by composer and singer Shankar Mahadevan along with Sridhar Ranganathan Founder and CEO of Cloodon- Personalized Learning Platform. Offices of the institution are located at Palo Alto, California in the United States and Bangalore in India.

== See also ==
- Delhi School of Music
- Gandharva Mahavidyalaya
