= Madurai S. Somasundaram =

Indian Carnatic vocalist (1919–1989)

- Also known as: Madurai Somu
- Born: S. Paramasivam; 9 February 1919
- Died: 9 December 1989 (aged 70)
- Genre: Carnatic music
- Occupation: Vocalist
- Instrument: Vocals
- Years active: 1934–1989

Madurai S. Somasundaram (born S. Paramasivam; 9 February 1919 – 9 December 1989), popularly known as Madurai Somu, was an Indian Carnatic music vocalist. A disciple of Chittoor Subramaniam Pillai, he began performing in 1934 at Tiruchendur and became known for his devotion to the deity Murugan, which shaped both his concert style and his best-known song, "Maruthamalai Maamaniye", from the 1972 Tamil film Deivam. He received the Padma Shri in 1976 and the Sangeet Natak Akademi Award in 1978.

== Early life ==
Paramasivam was born on 9 February 1919, the tenth child of Sachidanandam Pillai and Kamalambal. His grandfather, Srinivasa Pillai, was a well-known nadaswaram player, and the family lived in Swamimalai. Sachidanandam, a court clerk, was later transferred to Madurai, where the family settled on Sembu Kinatru Street.

As a boy, Paramasivam and his elder brothers attended a martial arts school run by Muthu Vadyar, where they learned silambam and wrestling. He was also drawn to the bhajans sung by Narayana Konar at a local temple, and would sit beside the singer playing the shruti box. His mother wanted him to learn the nadaswaram, but he chose vocal music, and was said to practise (sadhakam) while standing in neck-deep water.

== Training ==
Paramasivam's first teacher was Seithur Sundaresa Bhattar, a disciple of Kancheepuram Naina Pillai. He then studied Thevaram singing under Madurai Latchumana Chettiar, a disciple of M. M. Dandapani Desikar, and also learned from Sesha Bhagavathar, Abhirama Sastri and Madurai Thiruppugazh Mani. He later became a disciple of Chittoor Subramaniam Pillai.

== Career ==
In 1934, Paramasivam sang devotional songs before the presiding deity at the Murugan temple in Tiruchendur, an occasion regarded as the start of his career. His family credited the blessings of Somasundareswarar, the presiding deity of the Madurai temple, and from then on he was known as Somasundaram, shortened to Somu.

Somu was a devout follower of Murugan and was known to pause during concerts to chant the deity's name.

== Film music ==
His most widely known recording is "Maruthamalai Maamaniye", a song in praise of Murugan from the film Deivam (1972), with music by Kunnakudi Vaidyanathan and lyrics by Kannadasan. The song is set in the raga Darbari Kanada.

== Awards and honours ==
- 1976 – Padma Shri, Government of India
- 1978 – Sangeet Natak Akademi Award
- 1983 – Sangeetha Kalasikhamani, The Indian Fine Arts Society
- Honorary Doctor of Law (honoris causa), Annamalai University

He was also given the title Isai Perarignar.

== Death ==
Somu died on 9 December 1989.
