= J. Vaidhyanathan =

Indian Mridangam exponent

- Born: 22 April 1965 (age 60); Damal near Kanchipuram, Tamil Nadu
- Citizenship: India
- Occupation: instrumentalist
- Spouse: Poorna
- Children: 1
- Parent(s): D. K. Jayaraman; J. Jayalakshmi
- Awards: Sangeet Natak Akademi Award; Kalaimamani
- Musical career
- Genres: Carnatic music
- Instrument: Mridangam

J. Vaidhyanathan affectionately known as JV is a Mridangam exponent from Tamil Nadu, India. He was the first mridangist to receive the Yuva Kala Bharathi Award, Vellore Gopalachariar Memorial award and Isai Peroli Award. He also received several other awards including Kalaimamani the highest civilian award for artists in Tamil Nadu and Sangeet Natak Akademi Award, the highest Indian recognition given to practicing artists.

== Biography ==
J. Vaidhyanathan was born on 22 April 1965 to Carnatic musician D. K. Jayaraman and J. Jayalakshmi in Damal near Kanchipuram in Tamil Nadu. He was the youngest of his parents' three children. The family moved to Chennai a few years after he was born.

He is the nephew of D. K. Pattammal. Hails from a family of legendary Carnatic musicians, he started learning music at a very young age. Vaidhyanathan studied mridangam under T. K. Murthy. His sister C. Sukanya is a Carnatic vocalist.

He had performed mridangam with many famous Carnatic musicians like D.K. Jayaraman, D. K. Pattammal, M. S. Subbulakshmi, M. L. Vasanthakumari, K. V. Narayanaswamy, Semmangudi Srinivasa Iyer, M. Balamuralikrishna, T. N. Krishnan, M. S. Gopalakrishnan, S. Balachander and Lalgudi Jayaraman. He was awarded a Junior Scholarship by the Government of India in 1985.

=== Personal life ===
His wife Poorna, who holds a doctorate in music on Pattammal's music, has been a violin lecturer at the S. V. College of Music and Dance in Tirupati, run by Tirumala Tirupati Devasthanams, since 2005.

== Awards and honors ==
- Sangeet Natak Akademi Award 2016
- Kalaimamani (2006) from Government of Tamil Nadu
- Yuva Kala Bharathi Award
- Vellore Gopalachariar Memorial award from Sruti Magazine
- Isai Peroli title from Kartik Fine Arts
- Award from Chennai Music Academy 2019
