= V. Raghavan =

Carnatic musician (1908–1979)

- Born: Venkataraman Raghavan; August 22, 1908; Tiruvarur, Tamil Nadu, India
- Died: 1979
- Education: University of Madras
- Occupations: Sanskrit scholar and musicologist
- Notable work: Translation of Bhoja's Śṛṅgāra-prakāśa; Translations of Rabindranath Tagore's plays
- Spouse: Sarada Raghavan
- Children: 4, including Nandini Ramani

Venkataraman Raghavan (1908–1979) was a Sanskrit scholar and musicologist. He was the recipient of numerous awards, including the Padma Bhushan and the Sahitya Akademi Award for Sanskrit, and authored over 120 books and 1200 articles.

== Early life and education ==
V. Raghavan was born on 22 August 1908, in Tiruvarur in the Tanjore District of south India (Tamil Nadu). He lost his parents, father Venkataraman and mother Meenakshi, when he was only seven years old, on account of which Kamalamba, his mother's elder sister, took charge of the family and raised him and his three brothers and two sisters. During these days, V. Raghavan came under the tutelage of Pandit Sengalipuram Appaswamy Shastrigal and attended the Board High School in Tiruvarur.

He graduated from the Presidency College, Madras in 1930 with 3 college prizes and 5 university medals. He received his M.A. in Sanskrit Language and Literature with Comparative Philology and four schools of Indian Philosophy under Mahamahopadhyaya Prof. S. Kuppuswamy Sastri. He specialised in Alamkara and Natya Sastras and Sanskrit Aesthetics and earned his doctorate in 1934–1935 with Profs. S. Levi, F.W. Thomas and A.B. Keith as examiners. He also studied Sanskrit on the traditional lines and won medals and prizes for Sanskrit speaking and writing.

== Academic career ==
After a brief tenure as the superintendent of the Thanjavur Maharaja Serfoji's Saraswathi Mahal Library, Raghavan joined the Madras University in 1934 as a Ph.D. assistant and in 1935 as a lecturer. Rising to the rank of professor and head of the Department of Sanskrit, he held the latter position until his retirement in 1968.

Proficient in reading and deciphering palm-leaf manuscripts in Sanskrit, Prakrit, and Pali, Raghavan discovered, edited, and published numerous previously unpublished works during his long tenure at the University of Madras. Starting in 1935 and until his retirement from the university, he cataloged the discovered manuscripts in a publication series called the New Catalogus Catalogorum. For this endeavor, he gathered information on manuscripts in libraries, research institutions, monasteries, and private collections in India and abroad.

From 1953 to 1954, he toured Europe in search of Indian manuscripts in libraries, museums, and research institutions, discovering and cataloging about 20,000 previously uncatalogued manuscripts and an equal number of cataloged manuscripts. In addition, he surveyed Sanskrit and Indological studies in European universities and other institutions. He was invited to the USSR twice and to countries of East and Southeast Asia, Australia, Mauritius, Mexico, and Nepal, where he continued cataloging manuscripts, among other activities such as lecturing.

In 1936, he contributed to the Journal of Oriental Research, submitting the first comprehensive study of the Number of Rasas, i.e., Rasa, Aucitya, and Dhvani. The first edition of Number of Rasas was published by the Adyar Library and Research Centre, Chennai, in 1940.

Raghavan was among the founders of the Kuppuswami Sastri Research Institute and served as its secretary and journal editor until his death. He was the secretary (1951–1959) and the general president (1961) of the All-India Oriental Conference. He was a founding member of the Sanskrit Commission of the Government of India, the chairman of the Central Sanskrit Institute, president of the International Association of Sanskrit Studies, and the chairman of the organising committee of the International Ramayan Conference under the Sahitya Akademi (1974). In the same year, he became the president of the Second World Sanskrit Conference at the University of Turin, Italy.

He was a founding member of the Sahitya Akademi and the Sangeet Natak Akademi, and the founding editor of Samskrita Pratibha, a journal of the Sahitya Akademi (1958–1979).

In 1931, he paid frequent visits to Tanjore villages with K.V. Ramachandran to highlight the traditional Natakas of the Bhagavata's at Merattur, Sulamangalam. He presented a paper in the Madras Music Academy's annual conference session on "Some Names in Early Sangita Literature" in 1932.

Early in his career, he wrote reviews for the renowned magazines Sound & Shadow and Triveni on Carnatic music, Bharatanatya, and Harikatha performances. He also wrote film scripts for Puranas, epics, and Sanskrit classics and played an active role in producing dialogue, general advice, and scenario for three films, Sita Kalyanam (1934), Chandrasena (1935) and Jalaja (1938).

== Sanskrit ==
V. Raghavan authored numerous articles and books on Carnatic music, Bharatanatyam, and aesthetics in English, Tamil, and Sanskrit. He was known both for his command of primary texts in Sanskrit and for making them accessible to scholars, students, and Sanskrit-loving public through his articles and commentaries.

In 1963, he published a fully edited and translated Bhoja's Śṛṅgāra-prakāśa, a treatise in 36 chapters dealing with poetics and dramaturgy, and the largest known work in Sanskrit poetics. For this work and his commentary, he won the Sahitya Akademi Award for Sanskrit in 1966. He was awarded the prestigious Jawaharlal Nehru Fellowship in 1969. It was later published as volume 53 of the Harvard Oriental Series in 1998. Part 2 of Śṛṅgāra-prakāśa, was published by the Harvard Oriental Series as volume 54 in 2023.

He translated into Sanskrit Rabindranath Tagore first drama, Valmiki Pratibha, which deals with the transformation of Valmiki from a bandit into a poet and Natir Puja, The Dancing Girl's Worship, a drama that was made into a movie directed by Tagore himself.

He discovered and edited an ancient Sanskrit play, Udatta Raghavam by Mayuraja.

He founded an organisation, Samskrita Ranga in 1958, that deals with Sanskrit theatre and has enacted Sanskrit plays.

Raghavan translated many well-known Stotras along with notes. His collection of select verses and Stotras titled Prayers, Praises and Psalms was published in 1938 with a foreword by Mahatma Gandhi who referred to the succinct English translation of the Stotras by Raghavan. Other condensed editions that Raghavan wrote include Śrīmad Bhāgavata and Mahābhārata.

In 1948, Raghavan curated and published a detailed diary kept by Ananda Ranga Pillai, the Dubash (an Interpreter in Colonial India) of Puducherry, which dealt with the historical account of the cultural lives of people in the early part of the 18th-century Madras Presidency and the French Administrators of Puducherry.

Among Raghavan's works in English written for the general readers is The Indian Heritage, a selected and translated anthology of Sanskrit literature, published by the Indian Institute of World Culture, Bengalūru (1956). With a foreword written by the President of India, Rajendra Prasad, this work was chosen by the UNESCO as one of the best in the Collection of Representative Works in the Indian Series.

== Music and dance ==
As a musicologist, he specialised in Carnatic music. He was the secretary of the Madras Music Academy from 1944 until his death. A "Dr. V. Raghavan Research Centre" has since been named after him. He has also composed several songs including "Candrashekharam Ashraye" on Jagadguru Shri Chandrasekharendra Saraswati Swamy and Maithreem Bhajata, which were later rendered by the famous Carnatic musician Smt.M. S. Subbulakshmi.

Among Raghavan's major works of on dance and drama are the critical edition of Nṛtta Ratnāvalī of Jayasenapati (1254 A.D.) and Śṛṅgāra Mañjarī by Saint Akbar Shah (17th century), and the Nātakalaksanaratnakośa of Sāgaranandin, a 13th century treatise on the Hindu theater translated by Myles Dillon (Irish historian, philologist, and celticist) and Murray Fowler (Indologist and Linguist, University of Wisconsin), with introduction and notes by Raghavan. Raghavan also published comparative notes on concordance with Nāṭya Śāstra and its commentary Abhinavabhārati. His paper on Bharatanatyam, which he presented at the first dance seminar at the Sangeet Natak Akademi, New Delhi, in 1958, covered both the textual and practical aspects of the art.

== Awards and honors ==
Raghavan was a recipient of numerous awards, including the Padma Bhushan (in 1962), bestowed by the Republic of India, and Fellow of the Sahitya Akademi (National Academy of Letters) and the Sangeet Natak Akademi (National Academy of Music, Dance, and Theatre). He was a Jawaharlal Nehru Fellow (1968–1972). He received the Honorary Degree of Doctor of Literature, Vidyā Vācaspati, from the Sanskrit University, Varanasi, a recipient of P.V. Kane Gold Medal from the Asiatic Society, Mumbai, and an Honorary Member of the École française d'Extrême-Orient (the French School of the Far East), Paris, and the Austrian Academy of Sciences, Vienna.

Among the many honors that Raghavan received, he cherished most the titles of Kavi Kokila for his epic-poetry on the Carnatic music composer Muthuswami Dikshitar titled, Śrī Muttuswāmi Dīkṣita Charita Mahākāvyam, and Sakala-Kalā-Kalāpa, for his multi-faceted scholarship, both honors bestowed by His Holiness Sri Chandrashekarendra Saraswati, the 68th Sankaracharya of the Kanchi Kamakoti Peeta.

== Legacy ==
On his birth centenary, celebrations were held in August 2008. A book Smriti Kusumanjali was released, compiling tributes to him on his 60th birthday from personalities including then-president Dr. S. Radhakrishnan and vice-president V. V. Giri. V. Raghavan advised and supervised 22 Ph.D., M.Litt., and non-degree students in their research and publications. He remained a life-long mentor for his students from all over the world. V. Raghavan and Sarada Raghavan's had two sons and two daughters who are continuing Raghavan's legacy of scholarship and service through contributions of their own to the society, the sciences, and the arts.

No work on Indian aesthetics is complete without its quoting Dr. Raghavan.

— Kapila Vatsyayan
