= Narendran Commission =

Narendran Commission was an inquiry commission appointed by The Government of Kerala, India, in February 2000 to study and report on the adequacy or otherwise of representation for Backward Classes in the State public services. The report is available in the government web site. It submitted the report in November 2001 with statistical data on the representation of the various communities in the four categories of public services - State government departments, the judiciary, public sector enterprises, and universities and other autonomous institutions under the government.

== Main findings ==
The following are the main findings as mentioned in the report:

- Backward Class communities, like Ezhava hold posts substantially higher in number than their individual reservation quota.
- Report provides statistics of the backlog in the representation of the major Backward Class communities in the public services. Deficiency in the number of posts actually held (in reservation and open merit competition together) compared to the "entitlement in reservation quota" for the various communities are as follows
  - Muslims (reservation quota: 12 per cent) 7,383 posts
  - Latin Catholics (4 per cent) 4,370 posts
  - Nadars (2 per cent) 2,614 posts
  - Scheduled Castes converted to Christianity (1 per cent) 2,290 posts
  - Dheevara (1 per cent) 256 posts
  - Other Backward Communities (3 per cent) 460 posts; and Vishwakarmas (3 per cent) 147 posts
- The Committee suggest to implement special recruitment campaign to remove the backlog and to get equal right for all sectors of the society.

The Commission has observed that "As long as the present condition prevails, some of these sixty eight communities are likely to continue with poor representation while others will have adequate (some of them, more than adequate) representation," the Commission had noted

The Kerala government as well as the people discuss about this commission report very seriously. United Democratic Front (UDF) government has partially implemented the findings of the commission and the Left Democratic Front (LDF), who is ruling Kerala has promised to the people that it will look into the further steps to have a complete package to take care of the backlogs and reservation.

== Response to findings ==
Sree Narayana Dharma Paripalana (SNDP), Indian Union Muslim League (IUML), Communist Party of India (Marxist) (CPI(M)), Indian National Congress, Indian National League (INL) of Kerala has also welcomed this initiative and had asked the government to implement the report. But the Nair Service Society (NSS) and others representing forward caste interests challenged this demand.

There are different movements like Samvarana Samrakshana Action Council formed by Dalits, Christians and Muslims to push the government to implement the reservation for minorities.

== Creamy layer suggestions ==
The Supreme Court of India has pointed out its disagreement on the Narendran Commission's suggestion to increase the creamy layer quota to Rs 300,000 instead of the Rs 100,000 as suggested by Joseph Commission and has pointed out the margin is too high. The Kerala Government has taken further steps now to appoint a permanent commission to fix this layering in order to calculate the maximum income for the eligibility of reservation.
