= P. R. Thilagam =

Indian composer, vocalist and exponent of Kuravanji (born 1926)

- Born: 1926 (age 99–100); Thiruvarur, Tamil Nadu, India
- Occupation: Dance drama performer
- Known for: Kuravanji dance drama
- Awards: Padma Shri; Sangeet Natak Akademi Award

P. R. Thilagam (born 1926), popularly known as Thiruvarur Thilagam, is an Indian composer, vocalist and exponent of Kuravanji, a traditional form of dance drama popular in the Indian state of Tamil Nadu. She hails from Kondi parampara (Kondi heritage) of the Isai Vellalar community, a sect of women dedicated to the worship at Thyagaraja Temple, Tiruvarur.

Thilagam was born in 1926 at Thiruvarur, a town in Tamil Nadu famous for the Thyagaraja Temple, as one of the last among the Kondi Devadasis, in a family of dancers. Learning Kuravanji from her grandmother, Kamalambal, who was a notable performer of the dance drama, she started public performances and has performed on many stages in India and abroad. She is a recipient of the 1997 Sangeet Natak Akademi Award. The Government of India awarded her the fourth highest civilian honour of the Padma Shri, in 2007, for her contributions to Arts. Her performance has been video-documented by the Indira Gandhi National Centre for the Arts (IGNCA) while her life story is the main feature of a journal, Madras Season: Its Genesis, published by Sruti, a magazine dedicated for performing arts.

== See also ==
- Indira Gandhi National Centre for the Arts
