= T. M. Thiagarajan =

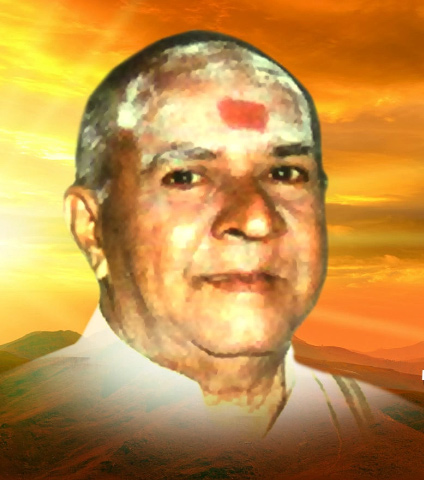
- T. M. Thiagarajan
- Born: Thanjavur Mahalingam Thiagarajan; 28 May 1923
- Died: 27 June 2007 (aged 84)
- Citizenship: India
- Occupation: carnatic musicologist
- Parent(s): Mahalingam Pillai, Seethalakshmi Ammal

T. M. Thyagarajan (Tamil: டி. எம். தியாகராஜன்) (28 May 1923 – 27 June 2007) fondly known as TMT was a Carnatic vocalist and musicologist from Tamil Nadu in Southern India. He was awarded the Madras Music Academy's Sangeetha Kalanidhi in 1981.

== Family background ==
He hails from an illustrious family in Thanjavur (Note: Thanjavur - sometimes written as Tanjore or Thanjavoor.) famous for music and dance. His grandfather and great-grandfather were Asthana Vidwans in the Baroda (Note: Baroda Princely State; now called Vadodara.) court. Even now members of this family are living in Vadodara with the family name Thanjavurkar.

Thiagarajan's father is Mahalingam Pillai, a mridangam maestro and his mother is Seethalakshmi Ammal.

== Training in music ==
Thiagarajan started learning music from his father. Later, he became a disciple of Semmangudi Srinivasa Iyer and had advanced training under him. Semmangudi Srinivasa Iyer, speaking on the occasion of T. M. Thiagarajan's 80th birthday, said that it was mridangam maestro Thanjavur Vaidyanatha Iyer who sent Thiagarajan to him as a student.

== Music programs ==
He performed his first stage concert at Thiruvaiyaru when he was only eight years old. A senior artist Pudukottai Dakshinamurthi Pillai, who accompanied him on mridangam was delighted with the boy's performance. At the end of the concert, Dakshinamurthi Pillai took the boy in his arms and blessed him.

Thiagarajan has performed numerous concerts on All India Radio, various TV channels and on stage. In the early days he was accompanied on the mridangam either by his father or his brother Thambuswamy. Another brother Balasubramanian accompanied on the violin. It was a family team. Both his brothers died in the same month.

== As a musicologist ==
Thiagarajan was not only a singer; he was a lyricist, composer, teacher and administrator.

He was Principal of the Government Music College in Chennai. After retirement from this post in 1981, he served as the Principal of the Music Teachers' college run by the Music Academy, Chennai.

He composed music to rare kritis of lesser known composers like Chengalvaraya Sastri, Ramaswamy Sivan, Annayya, Periyasamy Thooran.

He also composed music to Andal's Tiruppavai, Manaickavasagar's Thiruvembavai and published with notations.

== Students ==
Rajalakshmi Sekar, Trichy Sisters, Mangalam Shankar, S. Prema and S. Jaya, O. S. Thyagarajan, Sridhar Nilakantan, Gowri Gokul, Lakshmi Rangarajan, Kuzhikkarai Viswalingam, S. Seetharaman, E. Gayatri, M. Narmada, Raji Gopalakrishnan, Nirmala Sunderarajan, Subhashini Parthasarathy and Radha Namboodiri are some of the torch bearers of the TMT tradition.

== Awards and honours ==
- Sangeetha Kalanidhi, 1981 by Music Academy Chennai
- Sangeet Natak Akademi Award, 1982 by Sangeet Natak Academy
- Sangeetha Choodamani, 1974 by Sri Krishna Gana Sabha, Chennai
- New raga Thyagaraja Mangalam created and named after T. M. Thiagarajan by Mahesh Mahadev in 2021

== Death ==
After a prolonged illness T. M. Thiagarajan died on 27 June 2007 in Chennai.
