= Vijay Siva =

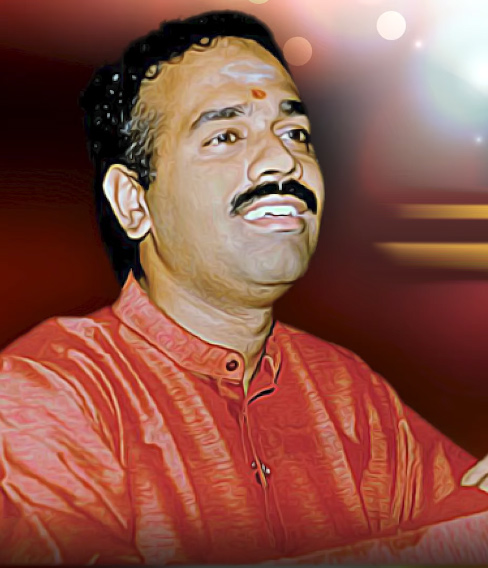

Background information
- Born: 29 March 1967 (age 58)
- Genres: Carnatic music – Indian Classical Music and Playback singing
- Occupation: Singer
- Labels: His Master's Voice, EMI, RPG, etc.

N. Vijay Siva (born 29 March 1967) is a Carnatic music vocalist. He is a disciple of the late D. K. Jayaraman.

== Background ==
Vijay Siva was born to Akhila Siva and A.N.Siva on 29 March 1967.

Vijay Siva went to Padma Seshadri Bala Bhavan Senior Secondary School, Chennai. He graduated with a first class from Vivekananda College, Chennai and secured a master's degree in commerce from Madurai Kamarajar University.

At the age of four, he exhibited a rare intuitive capacity to identify ragas. Vijay Siva first learnt Carnatic music from his mother, Akhila Siva, who was a vocal musician from Carnatic Music College, Chennai. Vijay Siva later learnt music from D. K. Jayaraman and D. K. Pattammal. Vijay Siva is also an accomplished mridangist, and received training from Kumbakonam Rajappa Iyer.

Vijay Siva's brother N. Manoj Siva is also an accomplished mridangam artist. His sister, Poorna Vaidyanathan (née Poorna Siva), is a trained violinist. Poorna is married to the accomplished mridangam artist, J. Vaidyanathan, who is D. K. Jayaraman's son.

== Music career ==
=== Touring ===
Vijay Siva has performed in all major sabhas all over India and has presented concerts in United States, Canada and Singapore.

=== Titles and awards ===
Vijay Siva has received in excess of 100 prizes for both Carnatic music and mridangam, including first Prize for Thevaram, Tiruvachakam and Thiruppugazh in 1974 and the coveted "Rajaji Tamboora" in 1981 from Tamil Isai Sangam, Chennai. He also received first prizes in Classical and Light Classical Music Competitions (1984) which were conducted by AIR. He was awarded titles like "Isai Peroli" (1995) from Karthik Fine Arts, and received the "Youth Award for Excellence" by Maharajapuram Viswanatha Iyer Trust in 1995, and was the first recipient of "Kalki Krishnamurthy Award (1996)" presented by Kalki Krishnamurthy Memorial Trust, Chennai.
