= T. Brinda =

- Born: 1912
- Origin: Madras Presidency, India
- Died: 1996 (aged 83)
- Genre: Carnatic music
- Occupation: vocalist of Indian classical music
- Instruments: vocals, saraswati veena

Thanjavur Brinda (1912-1996) was one of the representatives of the Veenai Dhanammal school of Carnatic Music. She was primarily a vocalist, although she also played the Veena. She is affectionately referred to as 'Brindamma', by her fans.

== Musical style ==
Brinda was born on 05-November-1912 in a family devoted to music. Brinda's grandmother, the legendary Veenai Dhanammal, and mother Kamakshi were from Devadasi tradition. Her mother Kamakshi and father Soundararaja Iyengar were not legally married, and Brinda grew up in Dhanammal's extended family. Brinda had much of her initial training from her mother Kamakshi. This training was in the Veenai Dhanammal style, a style of Carnatic Music known for its unhurried, alluring movements, as also for its use of intricate gamakas (graces) in the handling of ragas (modes). Grandmother Dhanammal herself taught Brinda some compositions. Additionally, Brinda trained for a substantial length of time under Shri Kanchipuram Naina Pillai, whose style of music was marked by agility and robustness in laya (rhythm). After her training under Naina Pillai, Brinda learnt from her maternal aunt Lakshmiratnam.

She rendered ragas that featured complex patterns and subtle gamakas, such as Begada, Mukhari, Sahana, Suruti, Varali and Yadukulakambhoji. She was a repository of Kshetrayya padams and javalis (romantic compositions rich in musical content) and many rare compositions of the Trinity of Carnatic Music and Patnam Subramania Iyer.

In her earlier years, Brinda performed extensively with her younger sister, T. Muktha. Brinda and Mukta were often joined in their concerts by their violinist sister Abhiramasundari (1918-1973) but she succumbed to tuberculosis. In her later years (from 1970s onwards), she often performed with her daughter Vegavahini Vijayaraghavan. Like her mother, Vegavahini played Veena as well. Brinda did not wish to record commercially, hence only private recordings of her performances are available. Brinda was also a visiting artist at the University of Washington at Seattle from 1968–69 and 1977-78.

Brinda used to attend Tyagaraja Aradhana in Tiruvaiyyaru, but when their age slowed them in their 80s, she and M S Subbulakshmi would sometimes attend the one at the Tyagaraja Sangeeta Vidwat Samajam in Mylapore. She died on 06-August-1996, aged 83.

== Legacy ==
Many talented and popular musicians were attracted by Brinda's musical scholarship and expertise, and trained under her. Carnatic Musicians such as Sangeetha Kalanidhis Semmangudi Srinivasa Iyer and M.S. Subbulakshmi have learnt from her. The musicians Ramnad Krishnan, Aruna Sairam, Chitravina Ravikiran, B. Krishnamoorthy, Chitravina Ganesh, K.N. Shashikiran, Kiranavali Vidyasankar, Geetha Raja, B. Balasubrahmaniyan, and her daughter Vegavahini have been Brinda's full-time students. She taught music to other disciples like Sakuntala Narasimhan, R K Srikanthan, Dr Ritha Rajan, Alamelu Mani and Radha Namboodiri. Her grandson and direct disciple Thiruvarur S. Girish is also an accomplished Carnatic musician.

== Awards ==
- Sangeetha Kalasikhamani award bestowed by The Indian Fine Arts Society, Chennai in 1973
- The Sangeetha Kalanidhi award, considered the highest honour for a Carnatic musician, in 1976
