= T. Viswanathan =

Indian musician (1927–2002)

T. Viswanathan த. விசுவநாதன்

Background information
- Born: 13 August 1927; Madras, Madras Presidency, British India (now Chennai, Tamil Nadu, India)
- Died: 10 September 2002 (aged 75) Hartford, Connecticut, USA
- Genre: Carnatic music
- Occupation: Musician
- Instrument: Carnatic flute

Tanjore Viswanathan (13 August 1927 – 10 September 2002) was a Carnatic musician specializing in the Carnatic flute and voice.

== Early life and background ==
Viswa, as T. (Tanjore/Thanjavur) Viswanathan is often called, was born in present-day Chennai, Tamil Nadu, India. He was the grandson of the legendary Veena Dhanammal, considered one of the greatest players of Veena, the South Indian lute. His mother Jayammal (1890-1967) was a singer, and often provided vocal support at her daughter's dance performances. Viswa's elder sister was T. (Tanjore/Thanjavur) Balasaraswati, the greatest exponent of Bharatanatyam (South Indian classical dance) in the second half of the 20th century. His elder brother was the mridangam player T. Ranganathan (1925–1987).

Though hailing from a highly esteemed musical family, at age eight Viswa sought the tutorship of Tiruppamparam Swaminatha Pillai, one of the innovators of the bamboo flute as an art musical instrument. At the time, Pillai lived in Tanjoor, about 200 miles from Madras, so Viswa left his parents' home to live and study with his teacher. He would practice for four hours a day, both before and after school. After a year, Pillai relocated to Madras, so Viswa returned to his family home but continued to study with Master Pillai for another 20 years.

== Career ==
Viswa combined the musical traditions of his family and that of Swaminathan Pillai to play the flute in a uniquely vocal style. In fact Viswa would very often put the flute down in the middle of his concerts and start singing, though he was not trained as a voice artist. We may well have heard the last of many of the songs that he used to perform, in particular the songs of Muthuthandavar which were set to music by Swaminathan Pillai, and a host of Padams, Javalis and Tillanas that were the property of the Dhanammal family. He trained a number of students in India and abroad to sing, but just one student, T.R. Moorthy, on the flute.

Viswa was largely responsible for putting Jon Higgins on the carnatic stage, who became so popular as to be known as Higgins Bhagavathar among the rasikas of South Indian music. To teach foreign students, Viswa employed complex notations to represent the ornamentation/oscillation that is characteristic to South Indian music.

He first came to the United States in 1958 on a Fulbright fellowship, studying ethnomusicology at the University of California, Los Angeles from 1958 to 1960, and later teaching there. He returned to India and was Head of the Department of Music at the University of Madras from 1961 to 1965. He settled in the United States in 1966, and also taught at the California Institute of the Arts. Following the earning of his Ph.D. from Wesleyan University in 1975, he taught at that university for many years. Among his best known students were Anuradha Sriram, T.R. Moorthy, Jon B. Higgins, Douglas Knight, and Ethnomusicologist David Nelson. While a majority of South Indian (Carnatic) flautists play with the 8-holed flute fashioned by T.R. Mahalingam (Mali), students of T. Viswanathan play with the 7-hole flute innovated by Swaminatha Pillai.

Viswanathan and his brother Ranganathan recorded the music for the Satyajit Ray documentary film Bala (1976), about their sister, the bharatanatyam dancer Balasaraswati.

He died of a heart attack on 10 September 2002 in Hartford, Connecticut. He is survived by his wife Josepha Cormack Viswanathan, one daughter (Jayasri), and two sons (Kumar and Kerey).

In 2004, Oxford University Press USA published a book co-authored by T. Viswanathan and Matthew Harp Allen, entitled Music in South India: The Karnatak Concert Tradition and Beyond, from the series Experiencing Music, Expressing Culture.

== Awards and honors ==
Viswanathan received some of the most prestigious awards in India, including Instrumental Musician of the Year (Kalaimamani) from the Government of Tamil Nadu (1978), the President's Award from the Sangeet Natak Akademi (1987), and the Madras Music Academy's Sangeetha Kalanidhi ("Treasure of Musical Art"), the highest award given to a South Indian musician (1988).

In 1992, Viswanathan became the first Indian musician to be awarded a National Heritage Fellowship by the National Endowment for the Arts, which is the United States government's highest honor in the folk and traditional arts. Also in 1992, he received a research fellowship from the American Institute of Indian Studies.
