= D. K. Jayaraman =

Damal Krishnaswamy Jayaraman
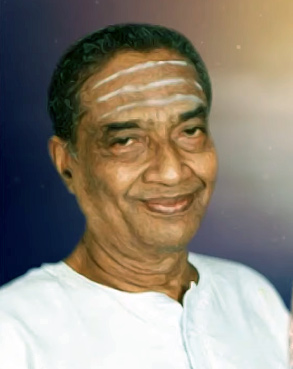

Background information
- Born: 22 July 1928
- Origin: Kanchipuram, Madras Presidency, India
- Died: 25 January 1991 (aged 62) Tamil Nadu, India
- Genres: Carnatic music and playback singing
- Occupation: singer
- Years active: 1933–1991
- Labels: His Master's Voice, EMI, RPG, AVM Audio, Inreco, Charsur Digital Workshop etc.

Damal Krishnaswamy Jayaraman (popularly known as DKJ), the renowned brother of D. K. Pattammal, was a professional Carnatic music singer. He was awarded the Madras Music Academy's Sangeetha Kalanidhi in 1990.

After learning music from his sister, he furthered his musical skills under many known masters in the field, including Muthiah Bhagavathar and Papanasam Sivan. Like his sister, Jayaraman was known for his moving krithi renditions, especially of Muthuswami Dikshitar's compositions. Jayaraman also sang Tamil songs such as those of Papanasam Sivan.

== Early life and background ==
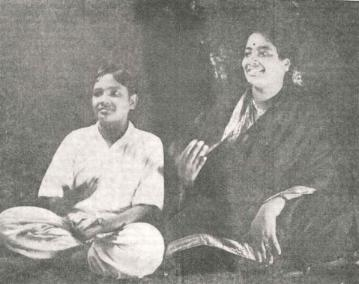
DK Jayaraman (left) in concert vocally accompanying his sister, DK Pattammal; circa early 1940s.

Born on 22 July 1928, to Damal Krishnaswamy Dikshitar and Rajammal in Kanchipuram, popularly known as DKJ, was the brother of the music queen D.K. Pattammal. DKJ inherited his diction and his interest and aptitude for Tamil songs from his father, who was proficient in Tamil literature.

DKJ’s first formal guru was his own sister Sangeetha Kalanidhi D.K. Pattammal. He listened to Vidwans like Ambi Dikshitar, N.S. Krishnaswamy Iyengar (disciple of Kanchipuram Naina Pillai), Koteeswara Iyer, Flute Venkatarama Iyer, T. L. Venkatarama Iyer and Papanasam Sivan, when they came home to coach Pattammal. DKJ once pestered DKP to write down the words of Balagopala kriti for him. He mastered the kriti overnight and rendered it perfectly the next day to an astonished but appreciative DKP.

Some of his popular disciples include Smt Rama Ravi (Ramaa Ravi), Vijay Siva, R. K. Shriramkumar, Balaji Shankar, Dr. S.Sunder, Asha Ramesh, T G Badrinarayanan, Sharada Mani, and his daughter Sukanya Jayaraman.

His son J. Vaidhyanathan is an eminent Mridangam player.
