= Thanjavur Quartet =

Carnatic music composers

Thanjavur Quartet were four brothers, Chinnayya, Ponnayya (1804-1864), Shivanand and Vadivelu, who lived during the early 19th century and contributed to the development of Bharatanatyam and Carnatic music.

Lineage of Thanjavur Quartet

They excelled in the art of Bharatanatyam. The brothers were employed in the courts of the Maratha King Sarfoji II at Thanjavur initially, and then moved to Travancore to the court of Swathi Thirunal. The Tanjore brothers gave the actual form of the recent day repertoire of Bharatanatyam - The Margam. The eldest of all the four brothers, Chinnayya moved to the Royal Court of Mysore during the rule of Krishnaraja Wadiyar III and composed many songs in praise of him. While his famous Thillana in Kapi Raga and Adi Tala is in praise of the Mysore King Sri Chamarajendra Wadiyar X and is one the most popular compositions. Ponnayya Pillai, the second eldest of the four brothers, should not be confused with his namesake descendent who was also an accomplished composer musician and was conferred Sangeet Kalanidhi award in 1933.

== Musical training ==
At the encouragement of the King they learnt the nuances of Carnatic music from a number of exponents of their time, including Muthuswami Dikshitar. Dikshitar appreciated Vadivelu Pillai as an ekasandhagrahi, one who had the ability to repeat a song heard only once. The quartet wrote a set of nine songs called navaratna mela in tribute of their teacher.

After a stint at the courts of Serfoji, the brothers moved to Travancore and were patronised by Swati Tirunal. The king appointed Vadivelu Pillai as the court musician. Vadivelu Pillai also learnt to play the violin gained expertise and demonstrated that not only Kalpita sangeetam but Manodharma sangeetam could also be easily and deftly played on the instrument. Vadivelu was the first to introduce Violin instrument to Carnatic music.

== Compositions ==
The four brothers composed numerous varnams and kritis. Some of these are Amba Souramba and Amba Neelamba, Ambaneelambari (Neelambari), Satileni (Poorvikalyani), apart from the navaratna mala.These brothers composed number of Varnas and Kritis.They were the first to formalise the performance pattern of bharatanatyam, and codify lessons called adavus (basic steps and the different categories of rhythm patterns) required for the same. They were the ones to plan and set the order of the different items of the repertoire in performance. The order they set was as follows. Melaprapti, Alarippu, Jatiswaram, Sabdam, swarajati, Chauka Varnam, Ragamalika, Padam, Javali, and Tillana. They also composed several pieces for each category set to different ragas and talas (rhythm structure).

== See also ==
- List of Carnatic composers
