= Balasaraswati =

Indian Bharatanatyam dancer (1918–1984)

Tanjore Balasaraswati
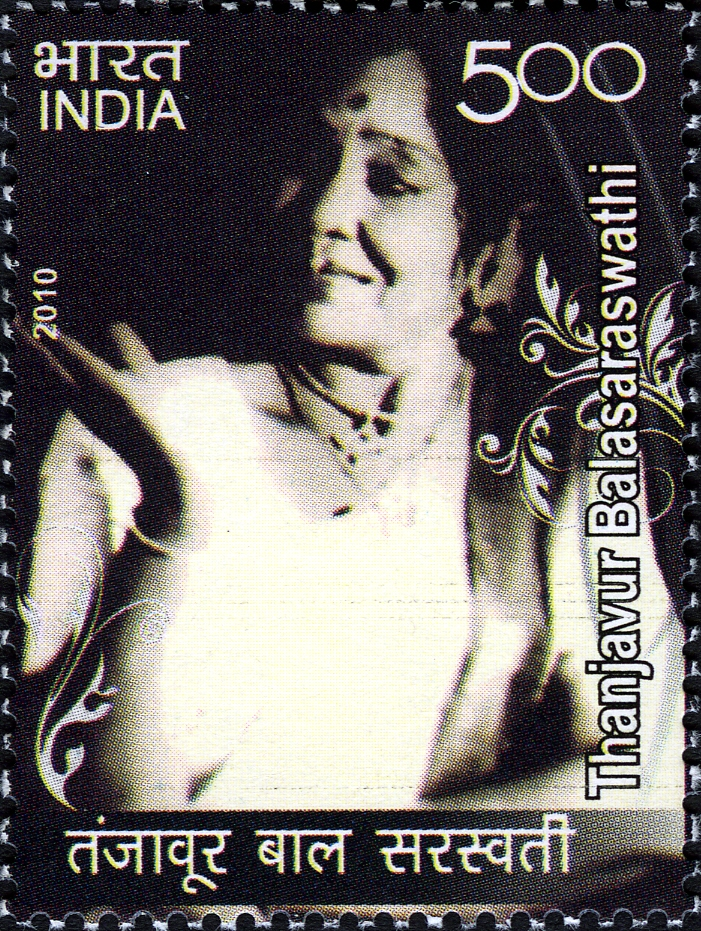
- Balasaraswati on a 2010 stamp

Background information
- Born: 13 May 1918; Madras Presidency, British India
- Origin: Tanjore
- Died: 9 February 1984 (aged 65) Madras, India
- Genre: Carnatic classical music
- Occupation: Bharatanatyam dancer

Tanjore Balasaraswati, also known as Balasaraswati (13 May 1918 – 9 February 1984), was an Indian dancer, and her rendering of Bharatanatyam, a classical dance style that originated in the South Indian state of Tamil Nadu, made this style of dancing well known in different parts of India and around the world. Belonging to the devadasi lineage, she preserved the traditional form of Bharatanatyam that embraced shringara (erotic depictions of divine love), viewing it as beautiful and spiritual rather than immoral, unlike dancers such as Rukmini Devi Arundale, who sought to reform the dance by removing its erotic elements.

She was awarded the Padma Bhushan in 1957 and the Padma Vibhushan in 1977, the third and the second highest civilian honours given by the Government of India. In 1973, Sangeet Natak Akademi Fellowship, the highest award of Sangeet Natak Akademi, India's National Academy of Music and Performing Arts in 1975 She was awarded the Sangeetha Kalanidhi by the Madras Music Academy. In 1981, she was awarded the Sangeetha Kalasikhamani award by the Indian Fine Arts Society, Chennai.

== Early life and background ==
Balasaraswati was a seventh-generation representative of a traditional matrilineal family of temple musicians and dancers (devadasis), who traditionally enjoyed high social status, who have been described as the greatest single repository of the traditional performing arts of music and dance of the southern region of India. Her ancestor, Papammal, was a musician and dancer patronised in the mid-eighteenth century by the court of Thanjavur. Her grandmother, Veenai Dhanammal (1867–1938), is considered by many to be the most influential musician of the early twentieth century. Her mother, Jayammal (1890–1967) was a singer who encouraged the training of Balasaraswati and was her accompanist.

Balasaraswati created a revolution in traditional music and dance for Bharatanatyam, a combination of the performance arts of music and dance. She learned music within the family from her infancy, and her rigorous training in dance began when she was four under the distinguished dance teacher K. Kandappan Pillai, a member of the famed Thanjavur Nattuvanar family. Her younger brothers were the musicians T. Ranganathan and T. Viswanathan who would both become prominent performers and teachers in India and the United States. Her daughter, Lakshmi Knight (1943–2001), became a distinguished performer of her mother's style. Her grandson Aniruddha Knight continues to perform the family style today, and is artistic director of Bala Music and Dance Association in the United States and the Balasaraswati School of Dance in India. Her son-in-law Douglas M. Knight Jr. has written her biography with the support of a Guggenheim Fellowship (2003). Famous Indian filmmaker Satyajit Ray made a documentary on her works.

== Career ==
Balasaraswati's debut took place in 1925. She was the first performer of her traditional style outside of South India, performing first in Calcutta in 1934. As a young teenager, she was seen by choreographer Uday Shankar, who became an ardent promoter of her performances, and throughout the 1930s she captured the imagination of audiences across India. She went on to a global career that attracted international critical attention and the respect of dance greats such as Shambhu Maharaj, Dame Margot Fonteyn, Martha Graham, and Merce Cunningham. Interest in Bharatanatyam rebounded in the 1950s as the public became interested in promoting a unique Indian art form. Balasaraswati, encouraged by an administrator at the Music Academy in Madras, established a dance school in association with the institution. There she trained new dancers in Bharatanatyam as per her vision. In the early 1960s she increasingly travelled globally, with performances in East Asia, Europe, and North America. Later that decade, throughout the 1970s, and into the early 1980s, she visited the United States repeatedly and held residencies—as both a teacher and a performer—at Wesleyan University (Middletown, Connecticut), California Institute of the Arts (Valencia), Mills College (Oakland, California), the University of Washington (Seattle), and Jacob's Pillow Dance Festival (Beckett, Massachusetts), among other institutions. Through her international engagements as well as her activities in India, especially in Madras, Balasaraswati not only exposed countless audiences to the traditional style of Bharatanatyam but also trained many new practitioners of the art form.

An American student of hers, by the name of Luise Scripps, created the American Society for Eastern Arts, and from July 1965, for over a decade, outstanding musicians, dancers and other artists from India and Indonesia, in particular, had the chance of travelling to the United States to present their art.

== Awards ==
She received numerous awards in India, including the President's Award from the Sangeet Natak Akademi (1955), Padma Vibhushan from the Government of India for distinguished national service (1977) and Sangita Kalanidhi from the Madras Music Academy, South India's highest award for musicians (1973). In a review in 1977, the New York Times dance critic Anna Kisselgoff described her as one of the "supreme performing artists in the world". India Today, based on a survey, classified her as one of the 100 prominent Indians who have shaped the destiny of India. She was the only non-Western dancer included in a compilation of the Dance Heritage Coalition, "America's Irreplaceable Dance Treasures: The First 100" (2000).

== See also ==
- Bharatanatyam
- Mani Madhava Chakyar

== In popular culture ==
Bengali film director Satyajit Ray made a documentary film on Balasaraswati named Bala (1976).

== Other sources ==
- "Tanjore Balasaraswati: Bharatnatyam’s Greatest Dancer", The Better India.
- "Tracing Balasaraswati’s journey", The Hindu, 25 January 2018.
- Gupta, Indra. India's 50 Most Illustrious Women. ISBN 81-88086-19-3.
- Knight Jr., Douglas M. Balasaraswati: Her Art and Life. Wesleyan University Press, June 2010. ISBN 978-0819569066.
- Bala (1976), a documentary by Satyajit Ray, available online via Wayback Machine.
- Poursine, Kay. "Hasta As Discourse on Music: T. Balasaraswati and her Art", Dance Research Journal, Vol. 23, No. 2, Autumn 1991, JSTOR.
- Poursine, Kay. "Bala in the US", Nartanam, Vol. IX, No. 4.
