= T. Muktha =

- Born: Thanjavur Muktha; 1914
- Origin: Madras Presidency, British India
- Died: 2007 (aged 92–93)
- Genres: Carnatic, Indian classical
- Occupations: Vocalist, teacher
- Instruments: vocals, saraswati veena

Thanjavur Muktha, also spelt Mukta and often referred as Mukthamma, (1914–2007) was one of the foremost representatives of the Veena Dhanammal school of Carnatic Music. She, along with her elder sister T. Brinda, formed one of the first women duo singers in Carnatic Music.

== Early life ==
Mukta's grandmother, the legendary Veenai Dhanammal, and mother Kamakshi were from Devadasi tradition. Kamakshi's companion Soundararaja Iyengar was Mukta's father. Mukta grew up in Dhanammal's extended family.

== Musical Influences ==
Muktha had much of her initial training from her mother Kamakshi. This training was in the Veena Dhanammal style, a style of Carnatic Music known for its unhurried, alluring movements, as also for its use of intricate gamakas (graces) in the handling of ragas (modes). Additionally, Muktha (along with Brinda) trained for a substantial length of time under Kanchipuram Naina Pillai and his aunt Kanchipuram Dhanakoti Ammal, whose style of music was marked by agility and robustness in laya (rhythm). After her training under Naina Pillai, Muktha learnt from her aunt Lakshmiratnam. The legendary Veena Dhanammal, who was Muktha's grandmother, herself taught her some compositions.

Mukta gave her first performance at the age of eight. She used to perform mostly with her elder sister T. Brinda in the first half of her long career. After the duo parted, she performed in concerts alone for 34 years. She was the last disciple of Veena Dhanammal and her last concert was in Cleveland in 2003.

== Legacy ==
Mukta was a very generous teacher to several musicians, the most prominent among them being Vedavalli, Dr Ritha Rajan, Smt Rama Ravi (Ramaa Ravi), and S. Sowmya.

Muktha was a recipient of the Sangeet Natak Akademi Award awarded in 1972.

Mukta died in Chennai on 11 March 2007 at the age of 92, leaving behind a daughter.
