= Mohanlal filmography =

List of performances by Indian actor Mohanlal

- Mohanlal in 2026
- Film: 368
- Television series: 1
- Television show: 5
- Radio show: 5
- Hosting: 5
- Music videos: 2
- Narrating: 27
- Theatre: 7
- Others: 10

Mohanlal is an Indian actor, producer, distributor, host, and playback singer who has starred in mainstream blockbuster and art-house films. He has made over 360 appearances in feature films during the span of his career, primarily in Malayalam cinema and along with Tamil, Telugu, Hindi and Kannada films.

Mohanlal began acting at the age of 18 in a brief role in the then-unreleased film Thiranottam (1978), released a quarter century later. He made his cinematic debut in 1980 as an antagonist in the romantic thriller Manjil Virinja Pookkal. His portrayal of Narendran, a sadistic husband, garnered him recognition and the film developed a cult status. He was thereafter cast in several films as villainous characters. Padayottam (1982), the first Malayalam film shot on 70 mm film featured him in a major supporting role as the son of one of the film’s leading antagonists. The family drama Aattakalasam established him as a leading actor in Malayalam cinema. In 1984 he starred in the screwball comedy Poochakkoru Mookkuthi, whose success generated a trend and popularised the genre in the 1980s. He played an antihero in Uyarangalil (1984), directed by I. V. Sasi receiving critical acclaim for his performance. In the same year, he co-founded Casino Films, (Note: Mohanlal co-founded Casino Films with I. V. Sasi, Seema, Mammootty, and Century Kochumon.) a motion picture production company that later produced his comedy films Gandhinagar 2nd Street (1986) and Nadodikkattu (1987).

His first song as a playback singer was "Sindhoora Megham" for Onnanam Kunnil Oradi Kunnil (1985). He starred in 34 films in 1986. His portrayal of T.P. Balagopalan, a lower-scale employee in the comedy-drama T. P. Balagopalan M.A. (1986) earned him the Kerala State Film Award for Best Actor becoming the youngest recipient at the age of 26, a record he held until 2006. The same year he co-founded Cheers Films, his second production company. (Note: Mohanlal co-founded Cheers Films with Century Kochumon.) Mohanlal's stardom catapulted with the success of the crime drama Rajavinte Makan (1986). In Irupatham Noottandu (1987), he portrayed mobster Sagar Alias Jacky and has become a cult figure since its release. His tragicomedy Chithram (1988) held the record for the longest continuous run at 58 weeks. In 1989, his performance in Kireedam earned him a Special Jury Mention at the 37th National Film Awards.

In 1990, Mohanlal founded his own film production company, Pranavam Arts. It debuted with the musical thriller His Highness Abdullah, garnered critical acclaim and became the year's highest-grossing film. The second film under Pranavam Arts was Bharatham (1991), earned him the National Film Award for Best Actor and Forbes India included it on its list of "25 Greatest Acting Performances in Indian Cinema". His film, the spiritual fantasy, Guru (1997), was the first Malayalam film from India submitted for the Academy Award for Best Foreign Language Film. In 1997, he received critical acclaim for the Tamil film Iruvar, directed by Mani Ratnam. Vanaprastham, which was screened at the Un Certain Regard section of the 1999 Cannes Film Festival, earned him the National Film Awards for Best Actor and Best Film (Producer).

In 2000, he starred in the action drama, Narasimham, which became the highest-grossing Malayalam film at the time. His character, Induchoodan has since attracted a cult following. In 2001, he portrayed Karna in the Sanskrit play, Karnabharam, directed by Kavalam Narayana Panicker. In 2003, he won an International Indian Film Academy Award for Best Supporting Actor for his role in the Hindi film Company. In 2005, he starred in the silent short film Reflections, directed by Bejoy Nambiar. His portrayal of an Alzhiemer patient in Thanmathra (2005) attained critical acclaim and earned him an honorary award from the Indian Medical Association. The Indian Territorial Army bestowed on him the honorary rank of lieutenant colonel for his performance as Major Mahadevan in the war film Keerthi Chakra (2006) and its sequel Kurukshetra (2008). In 2008, he starred in Twenty:20, a landmark film that featured almost all actors in the guild of Malayalam film actors, AMMA.

Drishyam (2013), in which he portrayed Georgekutty, an ordinary man, became the highest-grossing Malayalam film of all time. In 2016, he acted in the title role in the action film Pulimurugan which went on to become the highest-grossing Malayalam film ever and was the first Malayalam film to gross over ₹100 crore at the box office. In 2019, he acted in Prithviraj Sukumaran's directorial Lucifer, and the film went on to became one of the highest-grossing Malayalam film. In 2023, he starred in Neru which was a commercial success. In 2025, he reprised his role in L2: Empuraan and the subsequent film wasThudarum; both ranks as the highest grossing Malayalam films.

== Malayalam films ==
Key
†	Denotes films that have not yet been released

List of Mohanlal film credits
Year	Title	Role	Notes	Ref.
1980	Manjil Virinja Pookkal	Narendran		
1981	Sanchari	Dr. Sekhar		
1981	Thakilu Kottampuram	Advocate Paul		
1981	Dhanya	Mohanlal		
1981	Dhruvasangamam	Sankarankutty		
1981	Attimari	Shan		
1981	Thenum Vayambum	Varma		
1981	Oothikachiya Ponnu	Nandan		
1981	Ahimsa	Mohanan		
1982	Kelkkaatha Sabdham	Babu		
1982	Football	Balakrishnan		
1982	Padayottam	Kannan		
1982	Enthino Pookunna Pookkal	Surendran		
1982	Kaliyamardanam	Johnny		
1982	Madrasile Mon	Mohanlal		
1982	Aakrosham	Mohanachandran		
1982	Enikkum Oru Divasam	Babu		
1982	Sree Ayyappanum Vavarum	Kadutha	Cameo	
1982	Kurukkante Kalyanam	Sainaba's husband		
1982	Njan Onnu Parayatte	Shekharankutty		
1982	Ente Mohangal Poovaninju	Jayan		
1982	Aa Divasam	Boss		
1982	Sindoora Sandhyakku Mounam	Kishore		
1983	Bhookambam	Raghu		
1983	Hello Madras Girl	Lal		
1983	Sandhyakku Virinja Poovu	Ramu		
1983	Kuyiline Thedi	Thampuran Kutty		
1983	Naseema	Saithali		
1983	Himavahini	Pappy		
1983	Guru Dakshina	Minister Prabhakaran		
1983	Chakravalam Chuvannappol	Suresh		
1983	Thaavalam	Rajappan		
1983	Visa	Sunny		
1983	Aadhipathyam	Mohan		
1983	Ente Katha (film)	Ramesh		
1983	Oru Mukham Pala Mukham	Sukumaran Thampi		
1983	Pinnilavu	Raghu		
1983	Arabikkadal	Ravi		
1983	Sesham Kazhchayil	Police Inspector		
1983	Iniyengilum	Ravi		
1983	Marakkillorikkalum	Murali		
1983	Ente Mamattikkuttiyammakku	Alex		
1983	Engane Nee Marakkum	Shambu		
1983	Nanayam	Babu		
1983	Asthram	Das		
1983	Attakkalasam	Santhosh Babu		
1983	Kolakkomban	Gopi		
1983	Kattathe Kilikkoodu	Unni Krishnan		
1983	Changatham	S. T. Daniel		
1984	Akkare	Sudhakaran		
1984	Oru Kochu Swapnam	Gilbert		
1984	Manasariyathe	Mammootty		
1984	Swanthamevide Bandhamevide	Rajendran		
1984	Aalkkoottathil Thaniye	Anil Kumar		
1984	Poochakkoru Mookkuthi	Gopalakrishnan		
1984	Appunni	Menon Mash		
1984	Athirathram	Prasad		
1984	Unaroo	Ramu		
1984	Kaliyil Alpam Karyam	Vinayan		
1984	Kilikkonchal	Ratheesh		
1984	Pavam Poornima	Annan Thampuran		
1984	Lakshmana Rekha	Sudhakaran Nair		
1984	Vanitha Police	Achuthan		
1984	Vetta	Balan		
1984	Ivide Thudangunnu	Krishnakumar		
1984	Sreekrishna Parunthu	Kumaran		
1984	Kurishuyudham	Johny		
1984	Itha Innu Muthal	Himself	Guest appearance	
1984	Ariyaatha Veethikal	Balan		
1984	Aduthaduthu	Vishnu Mohan		
1984	Thirakal	James George		
1984	Uyarangalil	P. K. Jayarajan		
1984	Adiyozhukkukal	Gopi		
1984	Onnanu Nammal	Nandagopal		
1985	Avidathepole Ivideyum	Sukumaran		
1985	Nokketha Doorathu Kannum Nattu	Sreekumar		
1985	Omanikkan Ormavaikkan	Deva Kumar		
1985	Nayakan	Krishnadas		
1985	Anubandham	Bhaskaran		
1985	Onnanam Kunnil Oradi Kunnil	Nithin		
1985	Jeevante Jeevan	Jayan		
1985	Angadikkappurathu	Babu		
1985	Rangam	Appunni		
1985	Koodum Thedi	Peter		
1985	Ezhu Muthal Onpathu Vare	Anand		
1985	Aram + Aram = Kinnaram	Narayanan Kutty		
1985	Mulamoottil Adima	Adimakanne		
1985	Idanilangal	Balan		
1985	Boeing Boeing	Shyam		
1985	Njan Piranna Nattil	Inspector Rajasekharan		
1985	Adhyayam Onnu Muthal	Vishnu		
1985	Pathamudayam	Jayamohan and Vikraman		
1985	Guruji Oru Vakku	Sudhakaran Nair		
1985	Vasantha Sena	Devan	Guest appearance	
1985	Karimpinpoovinakkare	Bhadran		
1985	Azhiyatha Bandhangal	Balakrishnan		
1985	Uyarum Njan Nadake	Darappan		
1985	Parayanumvayya Parayathirikkanumvayya	Current Hamsa		
1985	Kandu Kandarinju	Krishnan Unni		
1986	Pappan Priyappetta Pappan	Inspector Devadas		
1986	Doore Doore Oru Koodu Koottam	Diwakaran		
1986	Mazha Peyyunnu Maddalam Kottunnu	Shambu	100th Film	
1986	Panchagni	Rasheed		
1986	Abhayam Thedi	Appu		
1986	T. P. Balagopalan M.A.	Balagopalan	Kerala State Film Award for Best Actor	
1986	Deshadanakkili Karayarilla	Harishankar		
1986	Vartha	Parol Vasu		
1986	Iniyum Kurukshetrum	Suresh Babu		
1986	Revathikkoru Pavakkutty	Dr. Madhavankutty		
1986	Kariyilakkattupole	Inspector Achuthankutty		
1986	Kunjattakkilikal	Balakrishnan		
1986	Hello My Dear Wrong Number	Venugopal		
1986	Ente Entethu Mathram	Mr. Menon		
1986	Neram Pularumbol	Godfree		
1986	Poomukhappadiyil Ninneyum Kathu	Pauly	Guest appearance	
1986	Kaveri	Balachandran Nair		
1986	Mizhineerppoovukal	Richard		
1986	Gandhinagar 2nd Street	Sethu / Ram Singh		
1986	Rajavinte Makan	Vincent Gomez		
1986	Yuvajanotsavam	Jayan		
1986	Sukhamo Devi	Sunny		
1986	Namukku Parkkan Munthirithoppukal	Solomon		
1986	Nimishangal	Murali		
1986	Manasilloru Manimuthu	Mohan		
1986	Oppam Oppathinoppam	Krishnan Kutty		
1986	Ninnishtam Ennishtam	Sreekumar		
1986	Thalavattam	Vinod		
1986	Geetham	Jagadeesh Nair	Guest appearance	
1986	Onnu Muthal Poojyam Vare	Telephone Uncle		
1986	Sanmanassullavarkku Samadhanam	Gopalakrishna Panicker	Filmfare Award for Best Actor – Malayalam	
1986	Padayani	Ramesh		
1986	Adiverukal	Balakrishnan		
1986	Shobhraj	Shobaraj and Dharmaraj		
1987	January Oru Orma	Raju		
1987	Amrutham Gamaya	Dr. P. K. Haridas		
1987	Ivide Ellavarkum Sukham	Appu		
1987	Adimakal Udamakal	Mohan Cheriyan		
1987	Sarvakalashala	Lal		
1987	Irupatham Noottandu	Sagar Alias Jacky		
1987	Cheppu	Ramachandran		
1987	Bhoomiyile Rajakkanmar	Raja Mahindra Varma		
1987	Unnikale Oru Kadha Parayam	Aby		
1987	Thoovanathumbikal	Mannarathodi Jayakrishnan		
1987	Kaiyethum Doorathu	Vinod	Delayed Release	
1987	Vazhiyorakkazhcakal	Raghvan / Antony Isaac		
1987	Nadodikkattu	Dasan		
1988	Mukunthetta Sumitra Vilikkunnu	Mukundan K.Kartha		
1988	Ayitham	Sankaran		
1988	Manu Uncle	Himself	Guest appearance	
1988	Orkkappurathu	Freddy Nicholas		
1988	Pattanapravesham	CID Ramdas / Dasan		
1988	Paadha Mudra	Mathu Pandaram and Soap Kuttappan	Filmfare Award for Best Actor – Malayalam	
1988	Aryan	Devanarayanan		
1988	Anuragi	Samu		
1988	Moonnam Mura	Ali Imran		
1988	Vellanakalude Nadu	C. Pavithran "C. P." Nair		
1988	Ulsavapittennu	Aniyankuttan		
1988	Chithram	Vishnu		
1989	Douthyam	Capt. Roy Jacob Thomas		
1989	Season	Jeevan		
1989	Varavelpu	Muralidharan		
1989	Naduvazhikal	Arjun		
1989	Vandanam	Unnikrishnan		
1989	Peruvannapurathe Visheshangal	Achutha Kurup	Cameo	
1989	Kireedam	Sethumadhavan	Special Mention at National Film Awards	
1989	Lal Americayil	Vinod	Delayed release Shot in 1986	
1989	Adhipan	Adv. Shyam Prakash		
1989	Dasharatham	Rajiv Menon		
1990	Aye Auto	Sudhi		
1990	No. 20 Madras Mail	Tony Kurishingal		
1990	Akkare Akkare Akkare	CID Ramdas/Dasan		
1990	His Highness Abdullah	Abdullah / Anandhan Nampoothiri		
1990	Kadathanadan Ambadi	Kadathanadan Ambadi	Delayed release Shot in 1987	
1990	Mukham	Hariprasad		
1990	Thazhvaram	Balan		
1990	Arhatha	Devaraaj		
1990	Indrajaalam	Kannan Nair		
1990	Appu	Appu		
1990	Lal Salam	Nettoor Stephan		
1991	Dhanam	Sivashankaran		
1991	Bharatham	Kalloor "Gopi" Gopinathan	National Film Award for Best Actor	
1991	Vishnulokam	Shanku		
1991	Vasthuhara	Venugopal		
1991	Uncle Bun	Charlie Chacko		
1991	Kilukkam	Joji	Kerala State Film Award for Best Actor	
1991	Ulladakkam	Dr. Sunny	Kerala State Film Award for Best Actor	
1991	Kizhakkunarum Pakshi	Ananth Moorthy		
1991	Abhimanyu	Harikrishnan		
1992	Sadayam	Sathyanadhan		
1992	Soorya Gayathri	Dr. Balasubramaniam		
1992	Kamaladalam	Nandagopan		
1992	Aham	Sidharthan		
1992	Rajashilpi	Shambhu		
1992	Yoddha	Thaiparambil Ashokan		
1992	Adhwaytham	Sivaprasad		
1992	Naadody	Sachidanandan and Balakrishnan Bhagavathar		
1992	Vietnam Colony	G. Krishnamurthy		
1993	Mithunam	Sedhumadhavan		
1993	Devaasuram	Mangalassery Neelakandan	Filmfare Award for Best Actor – Malayalam	
1993	Maya Mayooram	Krishnan Unni and Narendran		
1993	Butterflies	Prince		
1993	Gandharvam	Samuel Alexander		
1993	Chenkol	Sethumadhavan		
1993	Kalippattam	Venu		
1993	Manichithrathazhu	Dr. Sunny Joseph	200th Film	
1994	Pavithram	Unnikrishnan	Filmfare Award for Best Actor – Malayalam	
1994	Thenmavin Kombath	Manikyan		
1994	Pingami	Captain Vijay Menon		
1994	Pakshe	Balachandran		
1994	Minnaram	Bobby		
1995	Nirnayam	Dr. Roy Alex		
1995	Spadikam	Thomas "Aadu Thoma" Chacko	Kerala State Film Award for Best Actor	
1995	Thacholi Varghese Chekavar	Thacholi Varghese Chekavar		
1995	Manthrikam	Stephen Ronald / Alby Romeo Higuitta		
1995	Agnidevan	Aniyankuttan / Ravi Varma		
1996	Kaalapani	Dr. Govardhan Menon		
1996	The Prince	Jeeva		
1997	Varnapakittu	Sunny Palamattom		
1997	Chandralekha	Appukuttan / Alfy		
1997	Guru	Raghuraman	India's official entry to the Oscars	
1997	Oru Yathramozhi	Govindankutty		
1997	Aaraam Thampuran	Jagannadhan		
1998	Kanmadam	Vishwanathan		
1998	Harikrishnans	Adv. Krishnan		
1998	Summer in Bethlahem	Niranjan	Cameo	
1998	Rakthasakshikal Sindabad	Siva Subrahmanya Iyer		
1998	Ayal Kadha Ezhuthukayanu	Sagar Kottappuram / Vidyasagar		
1999	Ustaad	Parameswaran / Ustaad		
1999	Olympiyan Anthony Adam	SP Antony Chakkummoottil Varghese IPS		
1999	Vanaprastham	Kunjikuttan	National Film Award for Best Actor	
2000	Narasimham	Poovalli Indrachoodan		
2000	Life is Beautiful	Vinaya Chandran		
2000	Sradha	Gangaprasad IPS		
2000	Devadoothan	Vishal Krishnamoorthy		
2001	Kakkakuyil	Sivaraman		
2001	Ravanaprabhu	Mangalassery Neelakandan and Karthikeyan		
2001	Achaneyanenikkishtam	Mahadevan	Cameo	
2001	Praja	Zakir Ali Hussain		
2001	Unnathangalil	Vivek	Cameo	
2002	Onnaman	Ravishankar		
2002	Thandavam	Kashinathan		
2002	Chathurangam	Aatiprackal Jimmy Jacob		
2003	Mr. Brahmachari	Ananthan Thampi		
2003	Kilichundan Mampazham	Abdul Khader		
2003	Balettan	Athaniparambil Balachandran		
2003	Hariharan Pilla Happy Aanu	Hariharan Pilla		
2004	Vamanapuram Bus Route	Lever Johny		
2004	Vismayathumbathu	Sreekumar		
2004	Wanted	Narayana Swamy IPS		
2004	Natturajavu	Pulikkattil Charlie		
2004	Mampazhakkalam	Puramanayil Chandran		
2005	Udayananu Tharam	Udayabhanu		
2005	Chandrolsavam	Chirakkal Sreehari		
2005	Udayon	Shooranad Pappoyi and Shooranad Kunju		
2005	Naran	Mullankolli Velayudhan		
2005	Thanmathra	Ramesan Nair	Kerala State Film Award for Best Actor	
2005	Thiranottam	Kuttappan	Delayed release Shot in 1978	
2006	Rasathanthram	Premachandran		
2006	Kilukkam Kilukilukkam	Joji	Cameo	
2006	Vadakkumnathan	Iringannoor Bharatha Pisharadi		
2006	Keerthi Chakra	Major Mahadevan		
2006	Mahasamudram	Isahak Velankanni		
2006	Photographer	Dijo John and Joy John		
2006	Baba Kalyani	Baba Kalyani IPS		
2007	Chotta Mumbai	Vasco da "Thala" Gama		
2007	Hallo	Sivaraman		
2007	Alibhai	Anwar "Ali Bhai" Ali		
2007	Paradesi	Valiyakathu Moosa	Kerala State Film Award for Best Actor	
2007	Rock N' Roll	Chandramouli		
2007	Flash	Dr. Midhun Madhav		
2008	College Kumaran	Captain Sreekumar/ Canteen Kumaran/ College Kumaran		
2008	Innathe Chintha Vishayam	Gopakumar "G. K."		
2008	Mizhikal Sakshi	Professor Saeed Ahmed		
2008	Madampi	Putthanpurakkal Gopalakrishna Pillai		
2008	Aakasha Gopuram	Albert Samson		
2008	Kurukshetra	Colonel Mahadevan		
2008	Twenty:20	Devaraja Prathapa Varma		
2008	Pakal Nakshatrangal	Sidharthan		
2009	Red Chillies	Oyyarathu Madathil "O. M. R" Ramanathan		
2009	Sagar Alias Jacky Reloaded	Sagar Alias Jacky		
2009	Bhagavan	Dr. Balagopalan		
2009	Bhramaram	Sivankutty		
2009	Angel John	Angel John		
2009	Evidam Swargamanu	Mathews Jeremias		
2010	Janakan	Adv. Surya Narayanan		
2010	Alexander the Great	Alexander Varma		
2010	Oru Naal Varum	Kulappulli Sukumaran / DYSP Nandhakumar		
2010	Shikkar	Balaraman		
2010	Kandahar	Major Mahadevan		
2011	Christian Brothers	Christy Varghese Mappila alias Sherson		
2011	China Town	Mathukutty and Xavier		
2011	Pranayam	Mathews		
2011	Snehaveedu	Ajayan Menon	300th Film	
2011	Oru Marubhoomikkadha	P. Madhavan Nair		
2012	Casanovva	Casanovva		
2012	Grandmaster	IG Chandrasekhar IPS		
2012	Spirit	Raghu Nandan		
2012	Run Baby Run	Venu		
2012	Karmayodha	DCP Madhava "Mad Maddy" Menon IPS		
2013	Lokpal	Nandagopal / Lokpal		
2013	Red Wine	ACP Ratheesh Vasudevan IPS		
2013	Ladies and Gentleman	Chandrabose		
2013	Kadal Kadannu Oru Maathukutty	Himself	Guest appearance	
2013	Geethaanjali	Dr. Sunny Joseph		
2013	Drishyam	Georgekutty		
2014	Mr. Fraud	Bhai Ji / John Cliff / Sivaram		
2014	Koothara	Usthad Saali	Extended Cameo	
2014	Peruchazhi	Jagannathan		
2015	Rasam	Himself	Guest appearance	
2015	Ennum Eppozhum	Vineeth N. Pillai		
2015	Lailaa O Lailaa	Agent Jai Mohan		
2015	Loham	Rajeev "Raju" Sathyamoorthy		
2015	Kanal	John David		
2016	Oppam	Jayaraman		
2016	Pulimurugan	Murugan		
2017	Munthirivallikal Thalirkkumbol	Ulahannan "Unnachan"		
2017	1971: Beyond Borders	Colonel Mahadevan and Major Sahadevan		
2017	Velipadinte Pusthakam	Michael Idicula		
2017	Villain	ADGP Mathew Manjooran IPS		
2018	Aadhi	Himself	Cameo appearance	
2018	Neerali	Sunny George		
2018	Kayamkulam Kochunni	Ithikkara Pakki		
2018	Drama	Rajagopal		
2018	Odiyan	Odiyan Manickyan		
2019	Lucifer	Stephen Nedumpally / Khureshi Ab'ram		
2019	Ittymaani: Made in China	Ittymaani and Ittymaathan		
2020	Big Brother	Sachidanandan		
2021	Drishyam 2	Georgekutty		
2021	Marakkar: Arabikadalinte Simham	Kunjali Marakkar		
2022	Bro Daddy	John Chacko Kattadi		
2022	Aaraattu	Ganabushanam Neyyattinkara Gopan / Colonel Suryachandra Lal / Agent X		
2022	12th Man	DYSP Chandrashekhar		
2022	Monster	Lucky Singh / Shivdev Subramaniam IPS		
2023	Alone	Kalidas		
2023	Neru	Adv. Vijayamohan		
2024	Malaikottai Vaaliban	Malaikottai Vaaliban / Malaikottai Malayan		
2024	Barroz 3D	Barroz	Also director	
2025	L2: Empuraan	Khureshi Ab'ram / Stephen Nedumpally		
2025	Thudarum	Shanmugham "Benz"		
2025	Hridayapoorvam	Sandeep Balakrishnan		
2025	Bha Bha Ba	Ghilli Bala	Cameo	
2026	Patriot	Colonel Rahim Naik	Extended Cameo	
2026	Drishyam 3	Georgekutty		
2026	Thudakkam	Master	Cameo	
2026	Khalifa: The Ruler	Mambaraykkal Ahmad Ali	Cameo	
2026	Athimanoharam †	SI T.S. Lovelajan	Post-Production	
2027	Kathanar – The Wild Sorcerer †	Mar Abo	Cameo	
2027	L-Anoop Sathyan Project †	TBA	Filming	
2027	Operation Ganga †	TBA	Filming	
TBA	Nedumkandam Miracle †	TBA		
TBA	Ram †	Ram Mohan	Filming	
TBA	L-Jude Antony Project †	TBA		

== Other language films ==
Key
†	Denotes films that have not yet been released

Year	Film	Role	Language	Notes	Ref
1991	Gopura Vasalile	Accordionist	Tamil	Special appearance in the song "Keladi En Paavayae"	
1994	Gandeevam	Captain	Telugu	Special appearance in the song "Goruvanka Valagane"	
1997	Iruvar	Anandan	Tamil		
2002	Company	IG Veerappalli Srinivasan IPS	Hindi		
2003	Pop Carn	Vikramaditya	Tamil		
2004	Love	Mohan Nair	Kannada	Cameo	
2007	Ram Gopal Varma Ki Aag	Inspector Narasimha	Hindi		
2008	Halla Bol	Himself	Hindi	Guest appearance	
2009	Unnaipol Oruvan	DGP Govinda Raghavan Maarar IPS	Tamil		
2012	Tezz	Shivan Menon	Hindi	Cameo	
2014	Jilla	Shivan	Tamil		
2015	Mythri	Mahadev Godke	Kannada	Cameo; partially reshot in Malayalam as My Hero Mythri	
2016	Manamantha	Sai Ram	Telugu	Partially reshot in Malayalam as Vismayam	
2016	Janatha Garage	Sathyam	Telugu		
2019	Kaappaan	PM Chandrakanth Varma	Tamil		
2023	Jailer	Mathew	Tamil	Cameo	
2025	Kannappa	Kirata	Telugu	Cameo	
2025	Vrusshabha	Raja Vijayendra Vrusshabha / Aadi Deva Varma	Telugu	Partially reshot in Malayalam	
2026	Haiwaan	Jayaraman	Hindi	Cameo	
2026	Jailer 2	Mathew	Tamil	Cameo	

== Producer ==
List of Mohanlal film credits as producer
Year	Title	Production	Ref.
1984	Adiyozhukkukal	Casino Films	
1985	Karimbinpoovinakkare	Casino Films	
1986	Gandhinagar 2nd Street	Casino Films	
1986	Adiverukal	Cheers Films	
1987	Unnikale Oru Kadha Parayam	Cheers Films	
1987	Nadodikkattu	Casino Films	
1988	Orkkappurathu	Cheers Films	
1988	Aryan	Cheers Films	
1990	His Highness Abdulla	Pranavam Arts International	
1991	Bharatham	Pranavam Arts International	
1992	Kamaladalam	Pranavam Arts International	
1993	Mithunam	Pranavam Arts International	
1994	Pingami	Pranavam Arts International	
1996	Kaalapani	Pranavam Arts International	
1998	Kanmadam	Pranavam Arts International	
1998	Harikrishnans	Pranavam Arts International	
1999	Olympian Anthony Adam	Pranavam Arts International	
1999	Vaanaprastham	Pranavam Arts International	
2010	Kandahar	Pranavam Arts International	

== Narrator / voice-over ==
List of Mohanlal film credits as narrator or voice-over
Year	Title	Notes	Ref.
1989	Season	Also as lead actor	
1990	Indrajaalam	Also as lead actor	
1998	Kallu Kondoru Pennu	Theatare Version Only	
2002	Onnaman	Also as lead actor	
2007	Chotta Mumbai	Also as lead actor	
2008	Swarnam		
2009	Kerala Varma Pazhassi Raja		
2010	Janakan	Also as lead actor	
2012	The Hit List		
2012	Namukku Parkkan		
2014	Aamayum Muyalum		
2015	Ennum Eppozhum	Also as lead actor	
2015	Picket 43		
2017	C/O Saira Banu	Voice role: Peter George	
2017	Tiyaan	Voice of "time"	
2017	Aakashamittayi		
2018	Kayamkulam Kochunni	Also actor	
2019	Neeyum Njanum		
2019	100 Years of Chrysostom	Documentary; entered the Guinness World Records	
2019	Sye Raa Narasimha Reddy	Malayalam dubbed version	
2022	Pathonpatham Noottandu		
2023	King of Kotha		
2024	Gu		
2024	ARM	Voice-over for Cosmic creator	
2026	KD: The Devil	Voice over for the Teaser	
2026	Don't Trouble The Trouble	Voice over for the Trailer	
2026	Edavela	Narrator	

== Theatre ==
List of Mohanlal theatre credits
Year	Play	Role	Language	Premiere	Ref.
2001	Karnabharam	Karna	Sanskrit	Siri Fort Auditorium, New Delhi	
2003	Kadhayattam (Note: In Kadhayattam, Mohanlal played ten classic characters and situations from ten novels selected from Malayalam literature, which were written by O. Chandu Menon (Indulekha), C. V. Raman Pillai (Dharmaraja), S. K. Pottekkatt (Naadan Premam), Thakazhi Sivasankara Pillai (Chemmeen), P. Kesavadev (Odayil Ninnu), Vaikom Muhammad Basheer, Uroob (Ummachu), O. V. Vijayan (Khasakkinte Itihasam), M. Mukundan (Mayyazhippuzhayude Theerangalil), and M. T. Vasudevan Nair (Randamoozham).)	Soori Namboothiripadu; Chandrakaran; Pappu; Ikkoran; Chemban Kunju; Mayan; Allapicha Mollaka; Dasan; Bheeman; Vaikom Muhammad Basheer	Malayalam	Senate Hall, University of Kerala	
2008	Chayamukhi	Bhima	Malayalam	Lulu International Convention Centre, Thrissur	
2008	Maya Ravan (Ballet)	Hanuman (voice)	English	Nehru Centre, Mumbai	
2009	The Tempest	Prospero	Malayalam	Jose Thomas Performing Arts Centre	
2010	Vikramōrvaśīyam	Pururavas	Sanskrit	Ujjain, Madhya Pradesh	
2015	Naga	Narrator	Malayalam	Parish Hall, St. George Church, Kalady	

== Short films ==
List of Mohanlal short film credits
Year	Title	Role	Notes	Ref.
2005	Reflections	Loner		
2012	Wilson Pereira	Wilson Pereira; Squirrel; Fish; Crow	Animation film; also narrator (crow)	
2015	Punchirikku Parasparam	Himself	Cameo	
2016	Lodal Loda Lodalu	Himself	Cameo	
2017	Amar Jawan Amar Bharath	Himself	Cameo	
2017	Happy New Year	Himself	Cameo	
2020	Family	Himself	Short film for Sony	

== Radio drama ==
List of Mohanlal radio drama credits
Year	Title	Role	Broadcaster	Notes	Ref.
1993	Jeevanulla Prathimakal	Deepak	All India Radio	Re-broadcast on 27 September 2010	
1999	Kathukal Kadha Parayunnu	DYSP Nandagopan	All India Radio		
2024	AiDEN - The Ai Spirit	Raghu Uthaman	Club FM		
2026	Daivathin Manamaru Kandu	Ashokan	All India Radio		
2026	Kadankathayile Virunnukaran	Ayal	All India Radio		

== Television ==
Key
†	Denotes television productions that have not yet been released

List of Mohanlal television credits
Year	Title	Role rv	Network	Language	Ref.
2013	Badai Bungalow	Guest	Asianet	Talk show	
2015	Sanskrit News	Reporter	Janam TV	Inauguration episode	
2017–2018	Lal Salam	Host	Amrita TV	Talk show; co-hosted with Meera Nandan	
2018– present	Bigg Boss	Host	Asianet	Reality show	
2019	Top Singer Season 1	Guest	Flowers TV	Reality show	
2020	First Bell	Host (episode – Project Tiger)	Victers TV	Educational program	
2020	Lalonam Nallonam	Host / various roles	Asianet	Onam special show	
2020	Utsavam with Lalettan	Various roles	Flowers TV	Christmas special show	
2021	Onavillu	Host	Asianet	Onam special show	
2021	Top Singer Season 2	Guest	Flowers TV	Reality show	
2023	Mazhavil Entertainment Awards 2023	Guest	Mazhavil Manorama		
2024	Top Singer season 4	Guest	Flowers TV	Reality show	
2024	Manorathangal	Baputty	ZEE5	Anthology series Segment: "Olavum Theeravum"	
2024	Mazhavil Entertainment Awards 2024	Guest	Mazhavil Manorama		
2024	Vanitha Film Awards 2024	Guest	Mazhavil Manorama		
2025	Star Singer season 10	Guest	Asianet	Reality show	
