= List of awards and nominations received by Mohanlal =

List of awards received by Mohanlal
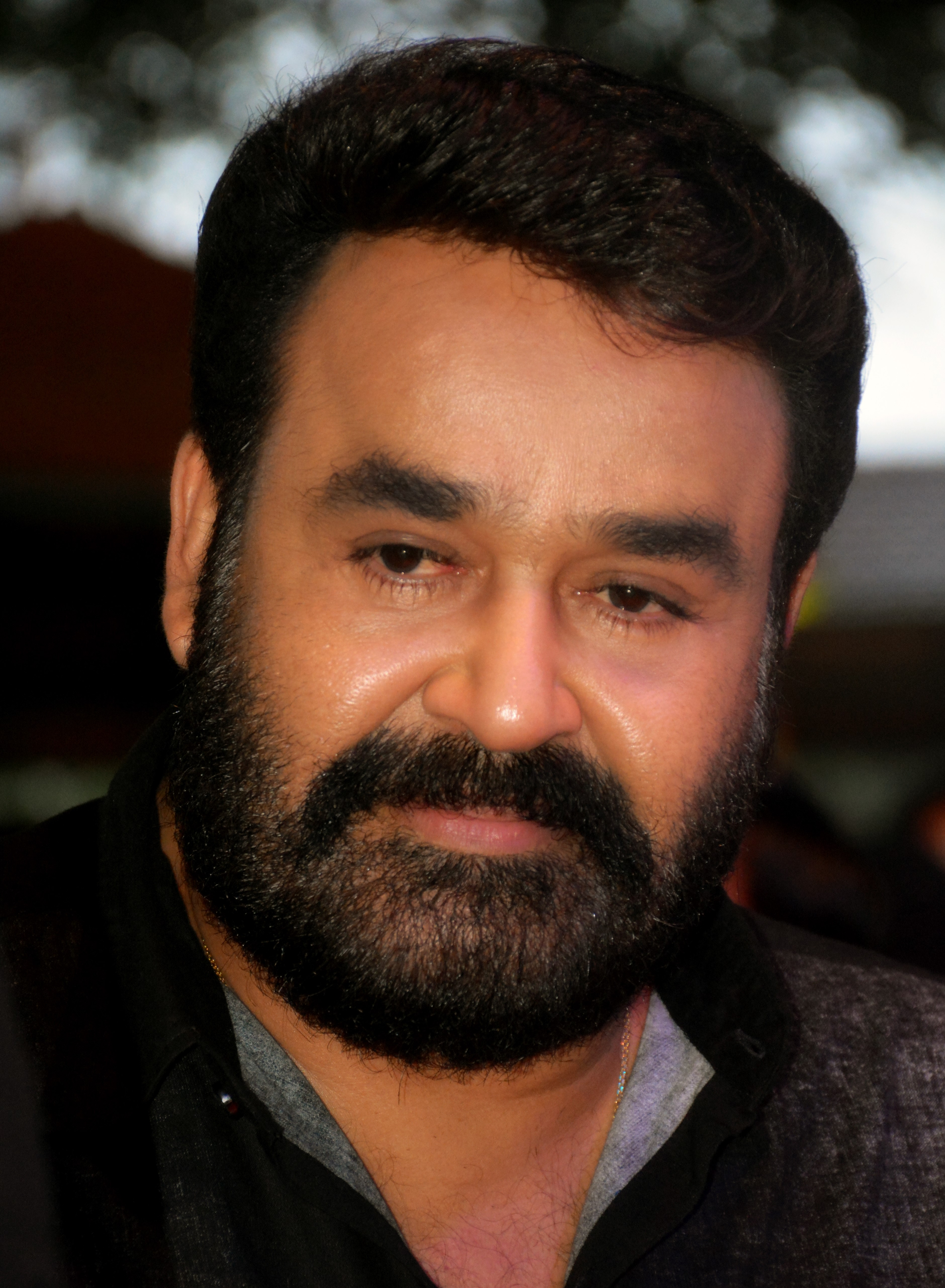
- Mohanlal in 2018
Awards and nominations
Award	Wins	Nominations
Titles and Honours	7	7
National Film Awards	6	37
Kerala State Film Awards	9	30
Filmfare Awards South	9	12
Nandi Awards	1	1
Filmfare Awards	0	11
Screen Awards	1	1
Screen Awards South	1	1
International Indian Film Academy Awards	1	1
IIFA Utsavam	0	2
South Indian International Movie Awards	5	9
Kerala Film Critics Association Awards	12	19
Asianet Film Awards	15	15
Vanitha Film Awards	9	9
Asiavision Awards	6	6
Mathrubhumi Film Awards	6	6
Amrita Film Awards	5	5
Other awards, honours and recognitions	57	0
- Totals
Wins	150
- References

Mohanlal is an Indian actor, playback singer and producer who predominantly works in Malayalam cinema and has acted in over 350 films. He is widely regarded as one of the most influential and greatest actors in the history of Indian cinema. He has won two National Film Award for Best Actor, one National Film Award – Special Mention (feature film), one National Film Award – Special Jury Award (feature film) and National Film Award for Best Feature Film as producer, nine Kerala State Film Awards including six Kerala State Film Award for Best Actor, one Nandi Award, nine Filmfare Awards South, two Screen Awards, one International Indian Film Academy Award, four South Indian International Movie Awards, and eleven Kerala Film Critics Association Awards and has received numerous other awards.

Mohanlal began his career in 1978 as an antagonist in the romance film Manjil Virinja Pookkal. After appearing in several such roles, he established himself as a leading actor in the mid 1980s. In 1986, he starred in the comedy drama T. P. Balagopalan M. A., for which he won the Kerala State Film Award for Best Actor. He also received a Filmfare Award for Best Actor – Malayalam in the same year for his performance in the comedy drama Sanmanassullavarkku Samadhanam. His role in the drama film Kireedam (1989) earned him a Special Mention.

In 1991, he produced and starred in the musical film Bharatham, which earned him the National Film Award for Best Actor. Forbes India listed his role as one of the "25 Greatest Acting Performances in Indian Cinema" compiled on the centenary of the Indian film industry in 2013. Four of his films released in 1997—Chandralekha, Guru, Oru Yathramozhi, and Aaraam Thampuran gave him the Screen Awards South for Best Actor. He co-produced and starred in the drama film Vanaprastham (1999), his role as a Kathakali artist garnered him the National Film Award for Best Actor, the Kerala State Film Award, the Filmfare Awards South, and the Kerala Film Critics Association Award .

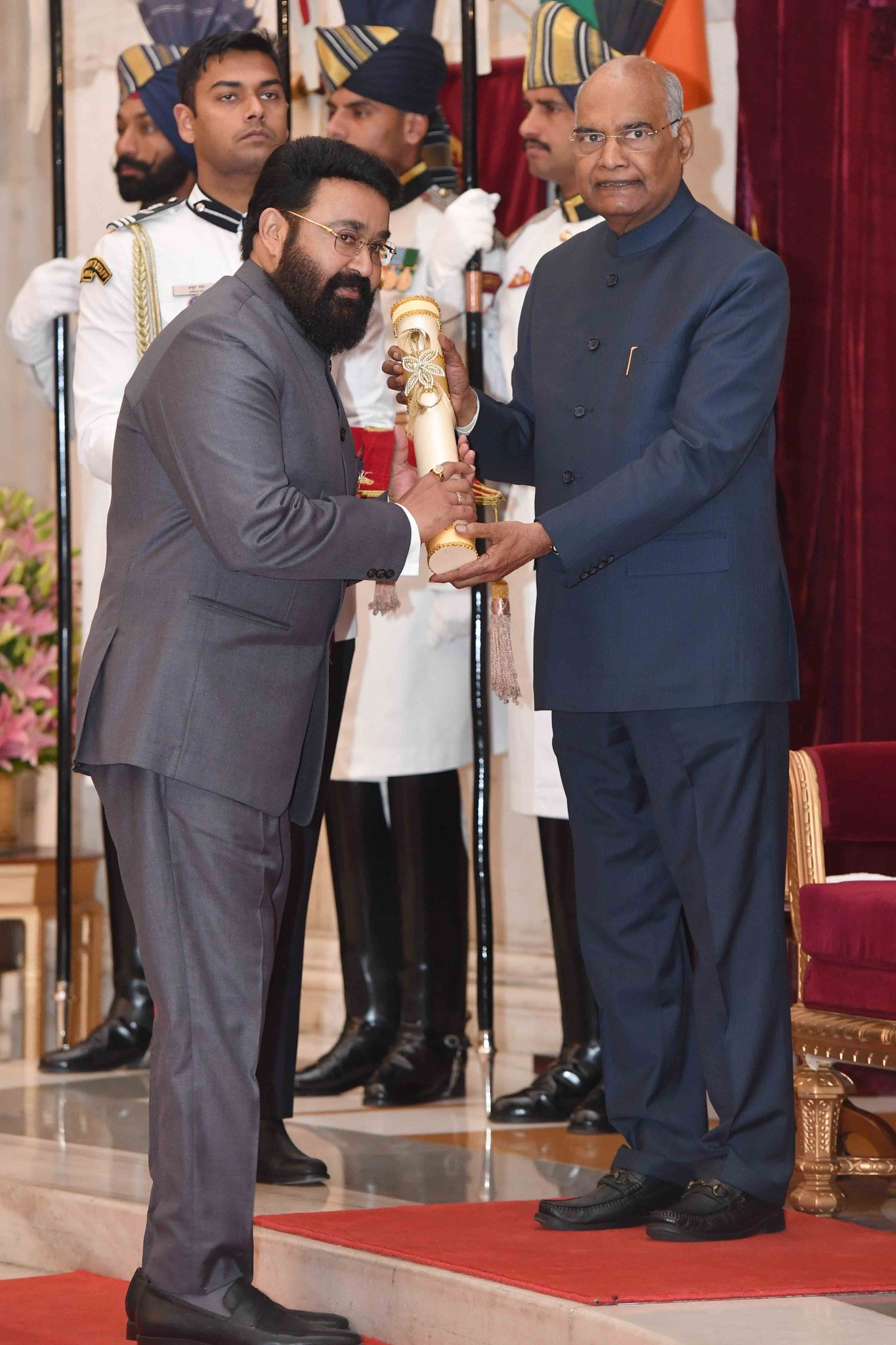
Mohanlal receiving Padma Bhushan from Ram Nath Kovind, the President of India

He was nominated for a Filmfare Award for his Hindi debut Company (2002) and his performance in the crime drama earned him a Screen Award and an International Indian Film Academy Award for Best Supporting Actor. He portrayed a patient suffering from Alzheimer's disease in the 2005 drama film Thanmathra for which he won the Kerala State Film Award for Best Actor and a Filmfare Award for Best Actor – Malayalam.

He portrayed an ageing bedridden man in the 2011 romantic drama Pranayam. His role won him the South Indian International Movie Awards for Best Actor and other awards including the Kerala Film Critics Association Awards, Asianet Film Awards, Vanitha Film Awards, and Mathrubhumi Film Awards. In 2013, he starred in the thriller film Drishyam, for which he won the Kerala Film Critics Association Awards for Best Actor. In a survey conducted by CNN-IBN in 2013 on "100 years of Indian cinema", he was placed third among actors on the list of "India's Great Actors". In 2017, he won the National Film Award – Special Jury Award for his performance in the films Janatha Garage, Munthirivallikal Thalirkkumbol, and Pulimurugan.

In addition to awards for acting, the Government of India honoured him with the Padma Shri, the fourth highest civilian award of the country in 2001, and the Padma Bhushan, the third highest civilian award in 2019 for his contribution to the arts. He was given the honorary rank of Lieutenant colonel from Indian Territorial Army in 2009. Mohanlal was awarded the honorary Doctor of Letters from the Sree Sankaracharya University of Sanskrit (2010) and from the University of Calicut (2018), as well as a number of other recognitions.

== Honours ==
Year	Honour	Honouring body	Presented by	Ref(s)
2001	Padma Shri	Government of India	K. R. Narayanan, President of India	
2009	Honorary Lieutenant Colonel	Indian Territorial Army	Deepak Kapoor, Chief of the Army Staff	
2010	Honorary Doctorate (D.Litt)	Sree Sankaracharya University of Sanskrit	R. S. Gavai, Governor of Kerala	
2013	Honorary Black Belt in Taekwondo	World Taekwondo Headquarters, South Korea	Grandmaster Lee Jeonghee, Sports GM, Indian ROK Embassy	
2018	Honorary Doctorate (D.Litt)	University of Calicut	P. Sathasivam, Governor of Kerala	
2019	Padma Bhushan	Government of India	Ram Nath Kovind, President of India	
2025	COAS Commendation Card	Indian Army	Upendra Dwivedi, Chief of the Army Staff	

== World records ==
- World's first fans association to enter in the Guinness Book of World Records on charity making the world's largest charity box
- Largest attendance at a 3D film screening
- Lent his voice to the longest documentary made in the world till now.

== National Film Awards ==
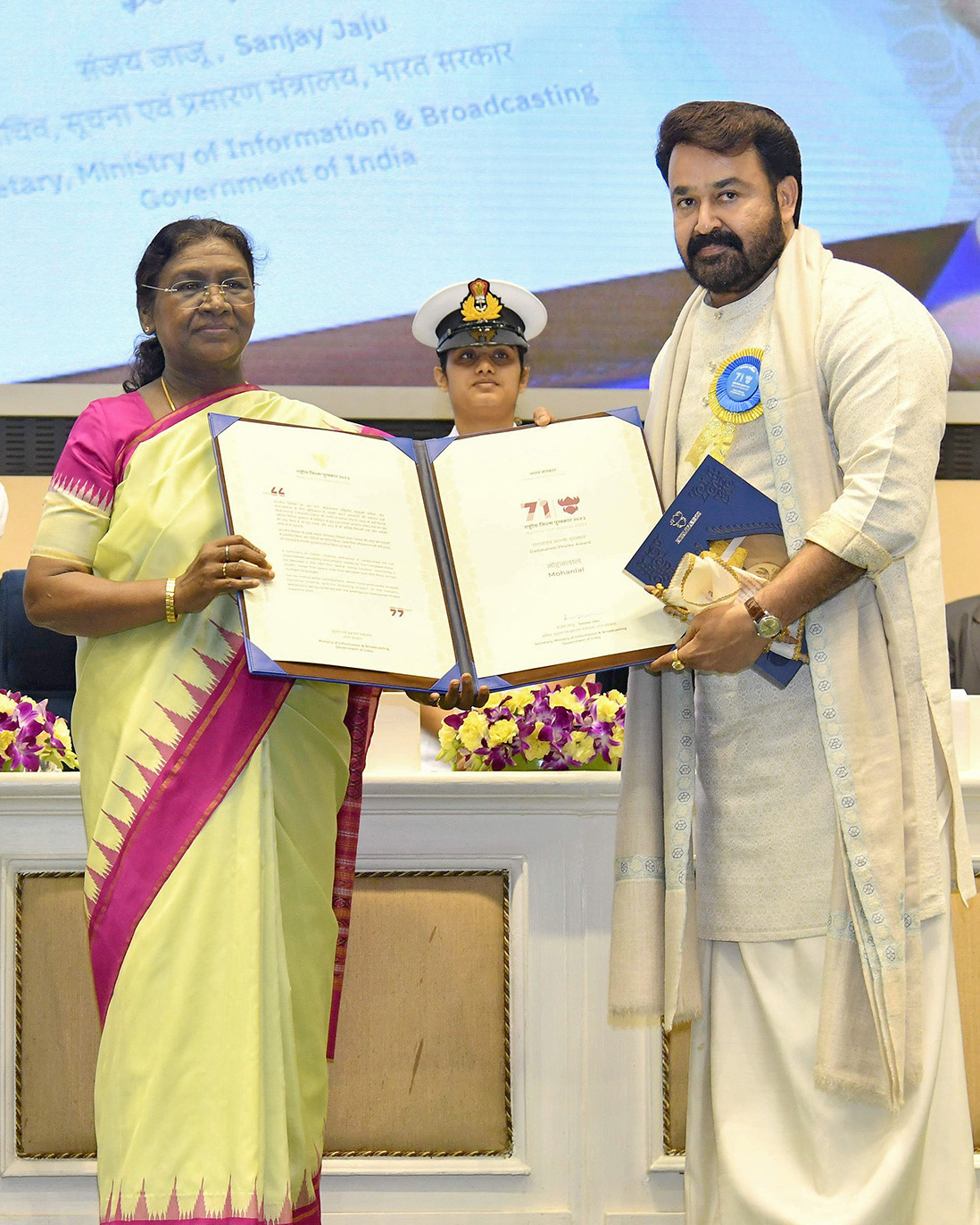
Mohanlal receiving Dadasaheb Phalke Award 2023 from Droupadi Murmu, the President of India

The National Film Awards established in 1954, are administered by the Directorate of Film Festivals, Government of India. Mohanlal has received six awards.

Year	Nominated work	Category	Language	Ref(s)
1989	Kireedam	Special Mention	Malayalam	
1991	Bharatham	Best Actor	Malayalam	
1999	Vanaprastham	Best Feature Film (producer)	Malayalam	
1999	Vanaprastham	Best Actor	Malayalam	
2016	Janatha Garage	Special Jury Award	Telugu	
2016	Munthirivallikal Thalirkkumbol	Special Jury Award	Malayalam	
2016	Pulimurugan	Special Jury Award	Malayalam	
2023	Lifetime achievement	Dadasaheb Phalke Award	—	

== Kerala State Film Awards ==
The Kerala State Film Awards are presented annually by the Kerala State Chalachitra Academy, Government of Kerala for excellence in Malayalam cinema.

Year	Nominated work	Category	Outcome	Ref(s)
1986	T. P. Balagopalan M.A.	Best Actor	Won	
1988	Padamudra, Chithram, Ulsavapittennu, Aryan, Vellanakalude Nadu	Special Jury Award	Won	
1991	Bharatham	Second Best Film (producer)	Won	
1991	Abhimanyu, Kilukkam, Ulladakkam	Best Actor	Won	
1995	Spadikam, Kaalapani	Best Actor	Won	
1995	Kaalapani	Second Best Film (producer)	Won	
1999	Vanaprastham	Best Actor	Won	
2005	Thanmathra	Best Actor	Won	
2007	Paradesi	Best Actor	Won	

== Kerala Film Critics Awards ==
The Kerala Film Critics Association Awards are presented annually (since 1977) by the Kerala Film Critics Association for excellence in Malayalam cinema.

Year	Nominated work	Category	Outcome	Ref(s)
1988	Padamudra, Chithram	Best Actor	Won	
1991	Bharatham, Ulladakkam	Best Actor	Won	
1999	Vanaprastham	Best Actor	Won	
2001	Contribution to Malayalam cinema	Natana Ratna Award		
2003	Lifetime achievement award	Chalachitra Ratnam Award		
2005	Naran, Thanmathra	Most Popular Actor	Won	
2007	Paradesi	Best Actor	Won	
2008	Kurukshetra, Pakal Nakshatrangal, Aakashagopuram	Best Actor	Won	
2011	Pranayam	Best Actor	Won	
2013	Drishyam	Best Actor	Won	
2016	Oppam	Best Actor	Won	
2018	Odiyan	Best Actor		
2025	Thudarum	Best Actor	Won	

== Nandi Awards ==
The Nandi Awards are presented by the Government of Andhra Pradesh for honouring artistic skills in Telugu cinema.

Year	Nominated work	Category	Outcome	Ref(s)
2016	Janatha Garage	Best Supporting Actor	Won	

== Filmfare Awards ==
The Filmfare Awards are presented annually by The Times Group for excellence of cinematic achievements in Hindi cinema.

Year	Nominated work	Category	Outcome	Ref(s)
2002	Company	Best Supporting Actor	Nominated	

== Filmfare Awards South ==
The Filmfare Awards South is a part of Filmfare Awards, which is given to the South Indian film industry, that consists of the Tamil, Telugu, Malayalam and Kannada film industries.

Year	Nominated work	Category	Language	Outcome	Ref(s)
1986	Sanmanassullavarkku Samadhanam	Best Actor	Malayalam	Won	
1988	Padamudra	Best Actor	Malayalam	Won	
1993	Devaasuram	Best Actor	Malayalam	Won	
1994	Pavithram	Best Actor	Malayalam	Won	
1995	Spadikam	Best Actor	Malayalam	Won	
1999	Vanaprastham	Best Actor	Malayalam	Won	
2005	Thanmathra	Best Actor	Malayalam	Won	
2007	Paradesi	Best Actor	Malayalam	Won	
2009	Bhramaram	Special Jury Award	Malayalam	Won	
2013	Drishyam	Best Actor	Malayalam	Nominated	
2016	Oppam	Best Actor	Malayalam	Nominated	
2016	Janatha Garage	Best Supporting Actor	Telugu	Nominated	

== Screen Awards ==
The Screen Awards are annually presented by the Indian Express Limited to honour excellence of cinematic achievements in Hindi and Marathi cinema.

Year	Nominated work	Category	Outcome	Ref(s)
2003	Company	Best Supporting Actor	Won	

== Screen Awards South ==
Year	Nominated work	Category	Language	Outcome	Ref(s)
1997	Aaraam Thampuran, Oru Yathramozhi, Guru, Chandralekha	Best Actor	Malayalam	Won	

== International Indian Film Academy Awards ==
The International Indian Film Academy Awards (IIFA) is annual event organised by the Wizcraft International Entertainment Pvt. Ltd. to honour excellence in the Hindi cinema.

Year	Nominated work	Category	Outcome	Ref(s)
2003	Company	Best Supporting Actor	Won	

== IIFA Utsavam ==
The IIFA Utsavam is an event organised by the Wizcraft International Entertainment Pvt. Ltd. to reward the artistic and technical achievements in South Indian cinema, that includes Telugu, Tamil, Malayalam, and Kannada cinema.

Year	Nominated work	Category	Language	Outcome
2017	Janatha Garage	Best Performance in a Supporting Role – Male	Telugu	Nominated
2017	Oppam, Pulimurugan	Best Performance in a Leading Role – Male	Malayalam	Nominated

== South Indian International Movie Awards ==
The South Indian International Movie Awards (SIIMA) are presented annually by the Vibri Media to recognise the best work in Telugu, Tamil, Malayalam, and Kannada film industries.

Year	Nominated work	Category	Language	Outcome	Ref(s)
2011	Pranayam	Best Actor	Malayalam	Won	
2012	Run Baby Run	Best Male Playback Singer	Malayalam	Nominated	
2012	Spirit	Best Actor	Malayalam	Won	
2013	Drishyam	Best Actor	Malayalam	Nominated	
2016	Pulimurugan	Best Actor	Malayalam	Won	
2016	Janatha Garage	Best Actor in a Supporting Role	Telugu	Nominated	
2018	-	Most Popular Star in the Middle East	-	Won	
2018	Odiyan	Best Actor	Malayalam	Nominated	
2019	Lucifer	Best Actor	Malayalam	Won	

== Ananda Vikatan Cinema Awards ==
Ananda Vikatan Cinema Awards is an annual awards ceremony for people in the Tamil film industry.

Year	Nominated work	Category	Outcome	Ref(s)
2009	Unnaipol Oruvan	Best Actor	Won	

== All India Radio Awards ==
The All India Radio (or Akashvani) is the national public radio broadcaster of India and is a division of Prasar Bharati.

Year	Nominated work	Category	Outcome	Ref(s)
2007	Rasathanthram, Vadakkumnadhan, Keerthi Chakra	Best Actor	Won	

== Asianet Film Awards ==
The Asianet Film Awards are presented annually (since 1998) by the television network Asianet, owned by Star India, a subsidiary of The Walt Disney Company.

Year	Nominated work	Category	Outcome	Ref(s)
2003	Balettan	Best Actor	Won	
2005	Thanmathra, Udayananu Tharam	Best Actor	Won	
2006	Kirtichakra	Best Actor	Won	
2007	Hallo, Chotta Mumbai	Most Popular Actor	Won	
2008	Madampi	Best Actor	Won	
2009	Bhramaram, Evidam Swargamanu	Best Actor	Won	
2010	—	Golden Star Award	Won	
2011	Pranayam, Snehaveedu	Best Actor	Won	
2012	Spirit, Grandmaster, Run Babby Run	Best Actor	Won	
2013	—	Millennium Actor Award	Won	
2014	—	Special Commemoration for '35 years in Malayalam Film Industry'	Won	
2015	—	Crowned as "Superstar of the Millennium"	Won	
2016	Oppam, Pulimurugan	Best Actor	Won	
2018	Odiyan, Kayamkulam Kochunni	Best Actor	Won	
2019	Lucifer	Best Actor	Won	

== Cinema Express Awards ==
The Cinema Express Awards are presented annually by Indian Express Group on behalf of Cinema Express film magazine to honour artistic excellence of professionals in the south Indian film industry.

Year	Nominated work	Category	Outcome	Ref(s)
1986	Panchagni	Best Actor	Won	

== Vanitha Film Awards ==
The Vanitha Film Awards is an annual awards ceremony organised by the woman's magazine Vanitha, part of the Malayala Manorama group, since 1998.

Year	Nominated work	Category	Outcome	Ref(s)
2003	Balettan	Best Actor	Won	
2005	Thanmathra	Best Actor	Won	
2007	Hallo, Chotta Mumbai	Most Popular Actor	Won	
2008	Twenty:20, Madampi, Akasha Gopuram	Best Actor	Won	
2009	Bhramaram, Evidam Swargamanu	Most Popular Actor	Won	
2011	Pranayam	Best Actor	Won	
2016	Oppam, Pulimurugan	Best Actor	Won	
2018	Odiyan	Best Actor	Won	
2019	Lucifer	Best Actor	Won	

== Asiavision Awards ==
Year	Nominated work	Category	Outcome	Ref(s)
2008	Innathe Chintha Vishayam, Madampi, Kurukshetra, Pakal Nakshatrangal	Best Actor	Won	
2009	Bhramaram	Best Actor	Won	
2012	Spirit, Run Baby Run	Best Actor	Won	
2012	-	Most Influential Malayali	Won	
2012	Run Baby Run	New Sensation in Singing – Male	Won	
2016	Oppam, Pulimurugan	Popular Actor	Won	

== Mathrubhumi Film Awards ==
The Mathrubhumi Film Awards are presented annually by the daily newspaper Mathrubhumi.

Year	Nominated work	Category	Outcome	Ref(s)
1999	Vanaprastham	Best Actor	Won	
2003	Balettan	Best Actor	Won	
2005	Thanmathra	Best Actor	Won	
2006	Vadakkumnathan	Excellence in Acting	Won	
2008	Aakasha Gopuram, Kurukshetra, Pakal Nakshatrangal	Best Actor	Won	
2011	Pranayam	Best Actor	Won	

== Amrita Film Awards ==
The Amrita Film Awards are presented annually by the television channel Amrita TV.

Year	Nominated work	Category	Outcome	Ref(s)
2006	Keerthi Chakra, Vadakkumnathan	Best Actor	Won	
2010	—	Abhinaya Keerthi Award	Won	
2011	Pranayam	Best Actor	Won	
2012	Spirit	Best Actor	Won	
2013	Drishyam	Best Actor	Won	

== Jaihind Film Awards ==
The Jaihind Film Awards are presented annually by the television channel Jaihind TV.

Year	Nominated work	Category	Outcome	Ref(s)
2007	Paradesi	Best Actor	Won	
2010	—	Chalachithra Ratnam Award	Won	
2011	Pranayam	Best Actor	Won	
2013	Drishyam	Best Actor	Won	

== Janmabhumi Cinema Awards ==
The Janmabhumi Cinema Awards are presented annually by the daily newspaper Janmabhumi.

Year	Nominated work	Category	Outcome	Ref(s)
2016	Oppam	Best Actor	Won	
2018	Odiyan	Best Actor	Won	

== The Kochi Times Film Awards ==
The Kochi Times Film Awards are presented by the Kochi Times news division of The Times of India.

Year	Nominated work	Category	Outcome	Ref(s)
2011	Pranayam	Best Actor – Male	Won	

== Kerala Film Audience Council Awards ==
The Kerala Film Audience Council Awards are presented by the Kerala Film Audience Council.

Year	Nominated work	Category	Outcome	Ref(s)
2003	Balettan	Best Actor	Won	
2004	Vismayathumbathu, Mampazhakkalam	Best Actor	Won	
2005	Thanmathra	Best Actor	Won	
2007	Paradesi	Best Actor	Won	

== V. Shantaram Awards ==
The V. Shantaram Awards, established in 1993, was instituted by the Government of India, Government of Maharashtra, and the V. Shantaram Motion Picture Scientific Research and Cultural Foundation.

Year	Nominated work	Category	Outcome	Ref(s)
2008	Paradesi, Aakasha Gopuram	Best Actor	Nominated	
2009	Bhramaram	Best Actor	Nominated	

== Ramu Kariat Awards ==
Year	Nominated work	Category	Outcome	Ref(s)
2011	Pranayam	Best Actor	Won	

== Other awards and recognitions ==
- 1977-78 Kerala State Wrestling Champion
- 2003 Contributor of the year honour by Indian Medical Association
- 2005 J.C. Foundation Awards for Best Actor – Thanmathra
- 2005 Kala Keralam Award for Best Actor – Thanmathra
- 2005 National Film Academy Award for Best Actor – Thanmathra
- 2006 CNN-IBN poll – Most Popular Keralite Award
- 2007 Kerala AIDS Control Society – Goodwill Ambassador
- 2009 Kerala State Athletics – Goodwill Ambassador
- 2009 Limca Book of Records "People of the year" Award
- 2009 Sree Chithira Thirunal National Award
- 2009 Annual Malayalam Movie Awards for Best Actor – Bhramaram
- 2009 Kairali TV Movie Awards for Best Actor – Bhramaram
- 2009 Jaycee Award for Best Actor – Bhramaram
- 2010 Reader's Digest included him in the list of "100 Most Trusted Indians".
- 2010 Thikkurissy Sukumaran Nair Memorial National Award for his contributions to Indian Cinema.
- 2010 Kerala Handloom Industry – Goodwill Ambassador
- 2011 Deccan Chronicle Survey – Most Popular Keralite
- 2011 Kerala Film Producers Association for Best Actor – Pranayam
- 2011 Viewers Choice Awards for Best Actor – Pranayam
- 2011 Nana Film Awards Special Jury Mention – Pranayam
- 2011 Reporter TV Film Awards for Best Actor – Pranayam
- 2012 His film Iruvar was included in the British Film Institute Sight and Sound "1000 greatest films of all time".
- 2013 Outlook India – "Most Influential Indian from Kerala".
- 2013 Forbes India included his 1991 role in Bharatham as one of the "25 Greatest Acting Performances of Indian Cinema".
- 2013 CNN-IBN survey on "100 years of Indian cinema" – 3rd position as India's Great Actors.
- 2015 All-Kerala Advertisers Agencies Association honoured him with the title "Brand Icon of Kerala" for his contributions to advertising world.
- 2016 Kerala organ donation programme – Goodwill Ambassador.
- 2016 Won "Manorama Newsmaker of The Year", title given to a Keralite who has hogged the most headlines and brought a positive change in society.
- 2017 "Indian Icon 2017" Award by Friends of Bahrain.
- 2018 P. Kesavadev Diabscreen Kerala Award
- 2019 Pranavapathmam Puraskaram by Santhigiri Ashramam
- 2019 Mazhavil Entertainment Awards – Ultimate Entertainer Actor
- 2020 P. V. Sami Memorial Industrial and Socio-cultural Award, for his contributions to Malayalam cinema for the last four decades and contributions for charity through ViswaSanthi Foundation
- 2021 Goodwill Ambassador of Tuberculosis eradication campaign by health department of the Government of Kerala
- 2022 Mazhavil Entertainment Awards – Master Entertainer Acting
- 2024 Sreekumaran Thampi Foundation Award for excellence in acting
- 2024 Kalabhavan Mani Memorial Awards -Best Debutant Director for Barroz 3D.
- 2025 Best Actor for Thudarum by Malayala Puraskara Samithi's Malayala Puraskaram 1201
- 2025 Mazhavil Entertainment Awards – Entertainer of the Year
