= Mohanlal =

Indian actor, producer, and playback singer (born 1960)

- Mohanlal in 2026
- Born: Mohanlal Viswanathan; 21 May 1960 (age 66); Elanthoor, Kollam district, Kerala, India (present-day Pathanamthitta district)
- Other name: Lalettan
- Education: University of Kerala
- Occupations: Actor; producer; distributor; playback singer
- Years active: 1978–present
- Works: Full list
- Spouse: Suchitra (m. 1988)
- Children: Pranav Mohanlal; Vismaya Mohanlal
- Relatives: K. Balaji (father-in-law); Suresh Balaje (brother-in-law); B. Unnikrishnan (relative)
- Awards: Full list
- Honours: Padma Shri (2001); Padma Bhushan (2019); Dadasaheb Phalke Award (2023)

Military service
- Allegiance: India
- Branch/service: Indian Army
- Years of service: 2009–present
- Rank: Lieutenant colonel (Hon.)
- Unit: Territorial Army
- Website: thecompleteactor.com

Mohanlal Viswanathan (IPA: [moːhɐnlaːl ʋiʃʋʷɐn̪aːt̪ʰɐn]; born 21 May 1960), known mononymously as Mohanlal, is an Indian actor, producer, and playback singer who predominantly works in Malayalam cinema and has also occasionally appeared in Tamil, Hindi, Telugu and Kannada films. Mohanlal has a prolific career spanning over four decades, during which he has acted in more than 400 films. The Government of India honoured him with Padma Shri in 2001 and Padma Bhushan in 2019, India's fourth and third highest civilian honours, for his contributions to Indian cinema. In 2009, he became the first actor in India to be awarded the honorary rank of lieutenant colonel in the Territorial Army. Mohanlal was named as one of "the men who changed the face of the Indian Cinema" by CNN. In 2025, the Government of India honoured him with the Dadasaheb Phalke Award, the highest award in the field of Indian cinema, for his "outstanding contribution to the growth and development of Indian cinema."

Mohanlal made his acting debut at age 18 in the Malayalam film Thiranottam in 1978, but the film was delayed in its release for 25 years due to censorship issues. His screen debut was in the 1980 romance film Manjil Virinja Pookkal, in which he played the antagonist. He continued to do villainous roles and rose to secondary lead roles in the following years. By the mid-1980s, he established himself as a bankable leading actor and attained stardom after starring in several successful films in 1986; the crime drama Rajavinte Makan released that year heightened his stardom. Mohanlal prefers to work in Malayalam films, but he has also appeared in other language films. Some of his best known non-Malayalam films include the Tamil political drama Iruvar (1997), the Hindi crime drama Company (2002) and the Telugu film Janatha Garage (2016).

Mohanlal has won five National Film Awards—two Best Actor, a Special Jury Mention and a Special Jury Award for acting, and an award for Best Feature Film (as producer), also nine Kerala State Film Awards and Filmfare Awards South and numerous other accolades. He received honorary doctorates from Sree Sankaracharya University of Sanskrit in 2010 and the University of Calicut in 2018.

Mohanlal is also known for his philanthropic endeavours. He founded the ViswaSanthi Foundation, a non-profit charitable organisation, to create and deliver high-impact and focused programmes to the underprivileged sections of society in the areas of healthcare and education.

== Early life ==
Mohanlal Viswanathan was born in the village of Elanthoor, Kollam district (present-day Pathanamthitta district), Kerala on 21 May 1960. He is the youngest child of Viswanathan Nair, a former bureaucrat and Law Secretary with the Kerala government, and Santhakumari. He had an elder brother named Pyarilal who died in 2000, due to heart related issues. Director B. Unnikrishnan is a close maternal relative of Mohanlal.

Mohanlal grew up in Mudavanmugal at his paternal home in Thiruvananthapuram. He studied at Government Model Boys Higher Secondary School, Thiruvananthapuram and graduated with a Bachelor of Commerce degree from Mahatma Gandhi College, Thiruvananthapuram. Mohanlal's first role was as a sixth grader for a stage play called Computer Boy, in which he played a ninety-year-old man.

During 1977 and 1978 he was the Kerala state wrestling champion.

Mohanlal was named by his maternal uncle Gopinathan Nair, who initially decided to name him Roshanlal before choosing "Mohanlal".

== Film career ==
=== Early years (1978–1985) ===
Mohanlal made his acting debut in 1978 with the film Thiranottam, which was produced and made by Mohanlal and his friends—Maniyanpilla Raju, Suresh Kumar, Unni, Priyadarshan, Ravi Kumar and a few others. Mohanlal played Kuttappan, a mentally disabled servant. Due to some issues with censorship, the film was not released on time. It took 25 years to release the film.

In 1980, Mohanlal was cast in the lead antagonist role in Manjil Virinja Pookkal – the directorial debut of Fazil. The film became a major success. Mohanlal's friends had sent his application in response to an advertisement released by Navodaya Studio. He auditioned for the role in front of a panel that included professional directors. Displeased with his appearance, two of them gave him poor marks, but Fazil and Jijo Appachan gave him 90 and 95 marks out of 100. In an interview with Reader's Digest in 2004, Mohanlal said that his looks as a young man might have fit the villain's image. His acclaimed negative roles include Sandhyakku Virinja Poovu and Kuyiline Thedi.

By 1983, Mohanlal was credited in more than 25 feature films, most of them had him playing negative roles. Films such as Ente Mohangal Poovaninju, Iniyengilum, Visa, Attakkalasham, Kaliyil Alpam Karyam, Ente Mamattukkuttiyammakku, Engane Nee Marakkum, Unaroo and Sreekrishna Parunthu changed his image. Through Sasikumar's Ivide Thudangunnu, he became a successful hero with a "good heart". Mohanlal played his first comic lead role in an ensemble cast in the 1984 comedy Poochakkoru Mookkuthi, directed by Priyadarshan, as a young man in love with a girl whom he mistakenly believes to be rich. It also marked the beginning of the Mohanlal-Priyadarshan duo, who as of 2016, have worked together in 44 films.

In 1985, he recorded a song for the film Onnanam Kunnil Oradi Kunnil. Uyarangalil, Nokketha Doorathu Kannum Nattu, Boeing Boeing and Aram + Aram = Kinnaram were some of his films in this period.

=== Established actor (1986–1999) ===
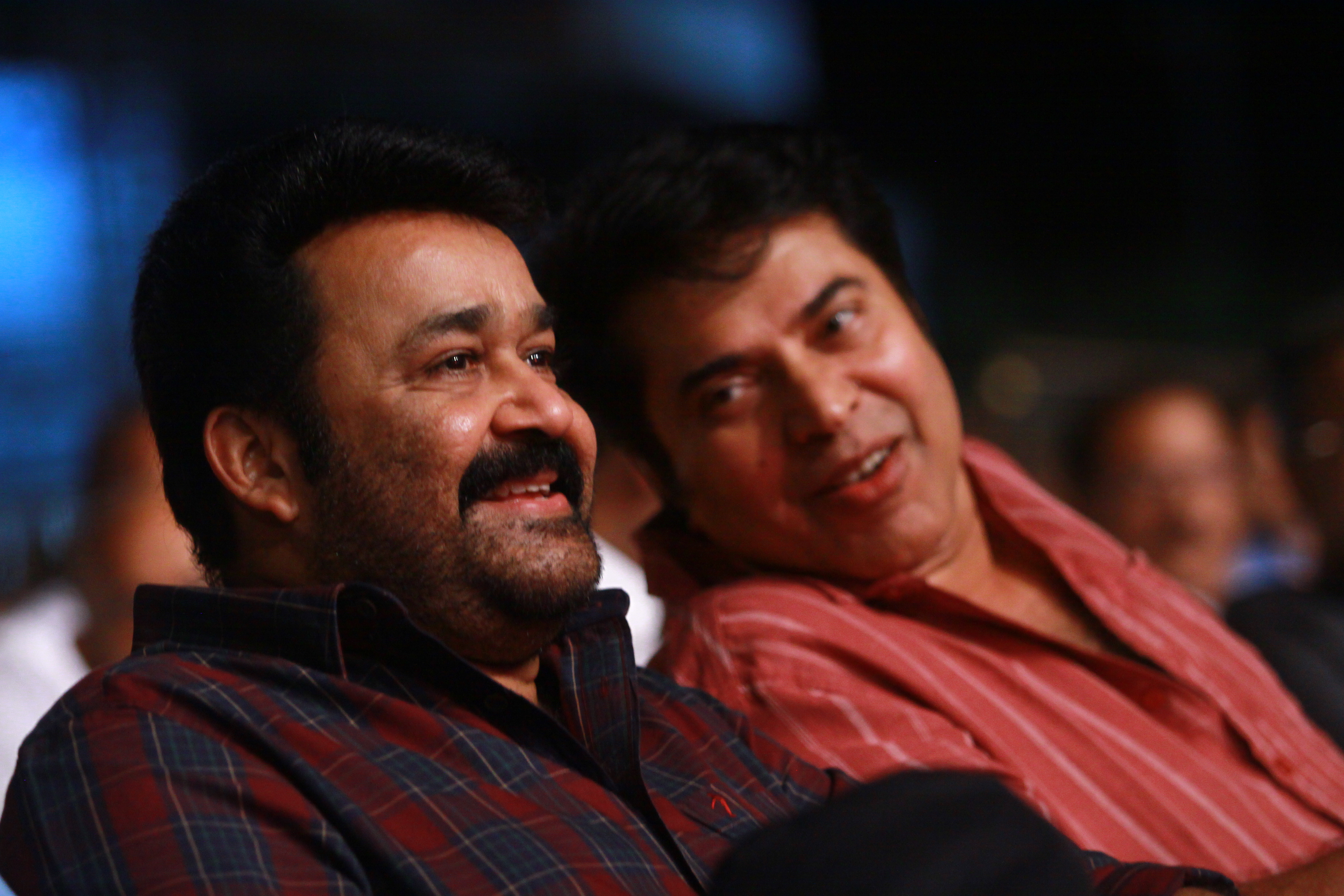
Mohanlal with Mammootty, two of the most influential actors in Malayalam cinema

During this period, Mohanlal played very different roles in films "made by the great masters", such as G. Aravindan, Hariharan, M. T. Vasudevan Nair, Padmarajan, Bharathan and Lohithadas. Mohanlal, along with actor and scriptwriter Sreenivasan, who played his sidekick in several films, showcased the angst of unemployed, educated Malayali youth forced to adapt to hostile environments in many realistic social satires, some of which were written by Sreenivasan himself.

In 1986, he starred in T. P. Balagopalan M.A., directed by Sathyan Anthikad, for which he received his first Kerala State Film Award for Best Actor. He portrayed an unemployed young man who shoulders the responsibility of his family. His performance in Sanmanassullavarkku Samadhanam as a harassed house-owner won him the Filmfare Award for Best Actor (Malayalam) in the same year. Mohanlal was given the status of a new Malayalam "superstar" by the public after the box office success of Rajavinte Makan (1986), in which he played an underworld don, Vincent Gomez. He also starred in the tragedy Thalavattom, playing Vinod, a young man who becomes mentally ill upon witnessing his girlfriend's death. He played Solomon in Padmarajan's Namukku Parkkan Munthirithoppukal. Mohanlal's association with Padmarajan was very well noted because their films told stories that were well and truly ahead of their times and broke many conventional stereotypes prevailing during that time in the Malayalam film industry. In 1986 alone, Mohanlal appeared in 36 Malayalam films.

The following year, Mohanlal starred with Sreenivasan and Shobana in the Sathyan Anthikad comedy Nadodikkattu, which became a box office success. Mohanlal and Sreenivasan reprised their roles as the detectives Dasan and Vijayan respectively in its sequels; Pattanapravesham (1988) and Akkare Akkare Akkare (1990). Thoovanathumbikal, directed by Padmarajan, in which he portrayed a person torn between his twin love interests, broke many stereotypes in Indian films, such as, the leading man falling in love with a second woman immediately after he is rejected by the first, and of a man falling in love with a sex worker. The romantic comedy Chithram, released in 1988, played for 366 days in a theatre, becoming the longest-running Malayalam film. Mohanlal won a Kerala State Special Jury Award in 1988 for his acting in Padamudra, Aryan, Vellanakalude Nadu, Ulsavapittennu and Chithram.

In 1989, the combination of the writer Lohitha Das and director Sibi Malayil created the character Sethumadhavan, a person who dreams of becoming a police officer, but ends up as a criminal, in the tragedy Kireedam. The role earned Mohanlal a National Film Special Jury Mention. Mohanlal later recalled that his portrayal of Sethumadhavan's mental agony, commended as a natural performance, was spontaneous and that he "did what Sethumadhavan, my character, would have done in such a situation", adding that acting was "akin to entering another person's body." In the same year, he acted in a film which became a commercial success, Varavelpu, which tells the story of a man who earned money working in the Gulf and came back home to enjoy his life with his family. He bought a bus, which eventually gets him into trouble. The former Prime Minister of India, Atal Bihari Vajpayee, mentioned the film as an example of ignorance by Malayali towards global economic changes during the inauguration of the Global Investor Meet held at Kochi on 18 January 2003. In 1989, he starred in another one of Padmarajan's movies; Season.

In the early 1990s, Mohanlal acted in a number of commercial films, such as His Highness Abdullah, Midhunam and No.20 Madras Mail. His Highness Abdullah was the first independent production of Mohanlal under his company Pranavam Arts International. Mohanlal appeared in Bharathan's Thazhvaram in 1990, as a widower seeking revenge for the murder of his wife by his most trusted friend. His romantic comedy Kilukkam in 1991 won him a State Film Award for Best Actor. The film is considered one of the greatest comedy films of all time in Malayalam. It also became the highest-grossing Malayalam film of the time. In 1991, Mohanlal produced and starred in Bharatham, which is interpreted as a modern-day adaptation of the Ramayana from Bharath's perspective. The film was a critical and commercial success, with his role as a Carnatic singer who is burdened by a jealous brother, earning him the National Film Award for Best Actor for that year. He portrayed a Bharatanatyam dancer in Kamaladalam(1992). He took help from his choreographer and his co-actors and professional dancers Vineeth and Monisha for enacting the dance scenes. Rajashilpi, Sadayam, Yoddha, and Vietnam Colony were his other films released in 1992. The drama Devaasuram (1993), written by Ranjith and directed by I. V. Sasi, was one of Mohanlal's most successful films and is regarded as a cult classic.

In 1994, Mohanlal starred in the lead role as Dr. Sunny Joseph, a psychiatrists in Fazil-directed classic Manichitrathazhu. One of the most successful Malayalam film, it ran for more than 365 days in few theatres. The film later gained cult status and is regarded as one of the best psychological thrillers in Indian cinema. Spadikam was a 1995 work for which he won his third Kerala State Film Award for Best Actor and fifth Filmfare Award for Best Actor (Malayalam) for his portrayal of Thomas "Aadu Thoma" Chacko, a young man who becomes a thug, estranged from his father, upon failing to meet the latter's high expectations. In 1996, Mohanlal starred in Priyadarshan's Kaalapani, an epic film about the prisoners in the Cellular Jail of Port Blair and Lohithadas's Kanmadam (1998). He played the lead role in Guru, directed by Rajiv Anchal in 1997. The film was chosen as India's official entry to the Oscars to be considered for nomination in the Best Foreign Language Film category for 1997.

Mohanlal acted in his first non-Malayalam film in 1997, in the Tamil biographical film Iruvar, directed by Mani Ratnam. The film, in which Mohanlal depicted an actor who turns to politics (based on the life of M. G. Ramachandran), was a critical success and won many awards including the Best Film award at the Belgrade International Film Festival and two National Film Awards. In 1998, he produced and starred in Harikrishnans, co-starring Mammootty and Juhi Chawla. The film was a commercial success, but was not well received by critics. The film had dual climaxes, which were screened in different regions, based on the popularity of the two lead actors in each particular region. This, however, became controversial and took a communal turn when lawsuits were filed claiming that prints exhibited in Hindu-dominated areas showed Mohanlal marrying the heroine, whereas the ones in Muslim-dominated areas showed Mammootty marrying her. The major issue was that the film showed uncensored scenes, as the submitted cut of the film to the Central Board of Film Certification was the version in which Mohanlal wins the leading lady. Hence they were forced to remove the Mammootty version from theatres, replacing it with the original. However, in television premieres, both film versions were shown.

Mohanlal depicted a Kathakali artist whose personal life is a tragedy in the 1999 Indo-French period drama Vanaprastham, produced by him and directed by Shaji N. Karun. It won him the second National Award for Best Actor and was the first film that got him international recognition by screening in various Film festivals. The film was selected for the competitive section at the Cannes Film Festival and his performance was critically acclaimed. It also earned him his fourth Kerala State Film Award for Best Actor, second National Film Award for Best Actor and sixth Filmfare Award for Best Actor (Malayalam). Vanaprastham was nominated for the Grand Jury Prize at the AFI Fest. Vanaprastham was screened in retrospective, during the 2014 International Film Festival of India in the 'Celebrating Dance in Indian Cinema' section.

=== Career expansion and stardom (2000–2009) ===
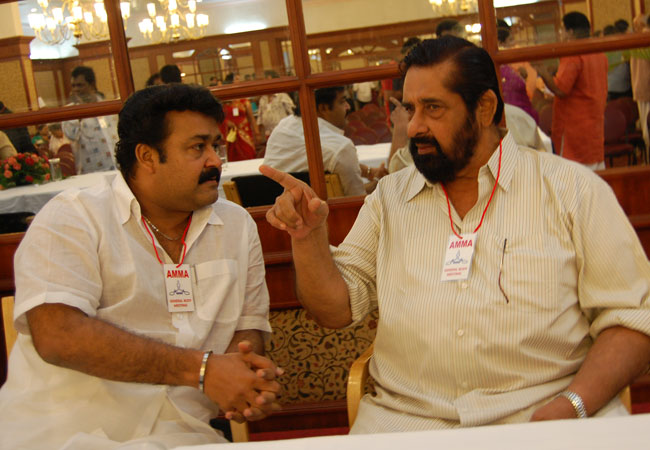
Mohanlal and Madhu at AMMA General Body meeting, 2008

In 2000, Mohanlal starred in Narasimham, playing a rogue with a good heart. It became the highest-grossing Malayalam film of all time. In the next two years, Mohanlal was typecasted in similar larger-than-life action hero roles in films such as Ravanaprabhu (2001), Praja (2001), Onnaman (2002), Thandavam (2002) and Chathurangam (2002). Except for Ravanaprabhu, these films were widely criticised for their repetitive plots, lewd dialogues, punch lines and male chauvinistic outlook. A critic from The New Indian Express wrote: "The Narasimham hangover is terrifically strong and it has, at least for the moment, killed the prospects of good films. I don't see any other reason for the failure of well made female-oriented films like Mazha and Madhuranombarakkattu".

In 2002, Mohanlal played Sreenivasan IPS, a Mumbai police officer, in his first Bollywood film Company, which introduced him to the Hindi-speaking audience in India and for which he won the International Indian Film Academy Awards (IIFA) and Star Screen Award for Best Supporting Actor. The film dealt with the real-life story of two underworld dons who ruled Mumbai (played by Ajay Devgn and Vivek Oberoi). Mohanlal's performance was well received. The Hindu noted that the actor is "at his natural best" and "does not look stifled or anxious as other South Indian stars do when they appear in a Hindi movie for the first time". In a 2010 online poll by Hindifilmnews.com, Mohanlal's performance in Company was chosen as "The Finest Performance of a Bollywood Actor in the Last Decade (2001–2010)". He was No. 1 in the audiences' list and maintained No. 6 in the critics' list.

The following year, Mohanlal, trying to change his action hero image, returned to comedic roles with Kilichundan Mampazham, Balettan, Hariharan Pillai Happy Aanu and Mr. Brahmachari. Kilichundan Mampazham, promoted as a comeback vehicle for the actor, received good reviews and a decent box office collection. Balettan, directed by V. M. Vinu, was also a commercial success. Mohanlal played Athanipparambil Balachandran, a bank employee always willing to lend a helping hand to others, who is forced to hide many secrets after his father's death leading to his family's mistrust. In 2004, Natturajavu and Mambazhakkalam were his only successes.

Mohanlal appeared in the 2005 black comedy Udayananu Tharam as an aspiring film director. It was well received by critics and performed well even in places where Malayalam films do not run in regular shows, such as Vadodara, Rajkot, Pune and Ahmedabad. In the same year, he appeared in director Blessy's second film Thanmathra, a film that tells the story of an individual suffering from Alzheimer's disease. The film received positive reviews and Mohanlal's performance was highly praised by critics. Mohanlal won his fifth Kerala State Film Award for Best Actor and seventh Filmfare Award for Best Actor for his performance. In the movie, his character does not speak in the second half.

In 2006, he worked with director Sathyan Anthikkad in Rasathanthram, a family drama. Mohanlal also acted in Kirtichakra, by director Major Ravi, in which he plays an Indian Army officer, Major Mahadevan. The film was shot in Kashmir, and was a notable commercial success. A dubbed Tamil version of the film was released in Tamil Nadu as Aran, but Mohanlal disassociated himself with the film since his voice was not used, stating that "I prefer to speak for my role in the film." Mohanlal also acted in the sequels Kurukshetra (2008) and Kandahar (2010) in the Major Mahadevan series. In 2009, the Indian government conferred him with the honorary title of lieutenant colonel in the Indian Territorial Army.

In 2007, Mohanlal won the Kerala State Film Award for Best Actor for his performance in Paradesi, directed by P. T. Kunju Muhammed. Sify.com stated that "Mohanlal is mesmerising and reinvents the idiom of acting once more with feeling." His July release Hallo became one of the highest-grossing Malayalam films of the year. In August that year, he appeared in his second Bollywood film Aag, (also called Ram Gopal Varma Ki Aag), a remake of the Bollywood classic Sholay (1975). Mohanlal reprised the role played by Sanjeev Kumar from the original. In 2008, Mohanlal did the lead role in the multi-starrer blockbuster Twenty:20 and in 2009, he co-starred with Kamal Haasan in the Tamil film Unnaipol Oruvan. His last film of the year, Evidam Swargamanu, was directed by Rosshan Andrrews.

=== Continued commercial success (2010–2015) ===
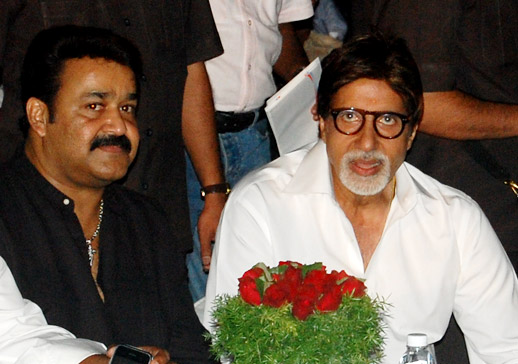
Mohanlal with Amitabh Bachchan

In 2010, he acted in five films, the first being Janakan, a crime thriller in which he co-starred with Suresh Gopi, written by S. N Swamy. In the film, he played Adv. Surya Narayanan encounters some runaway suspects as they approach him for justice. Alexander the Great, directed by Murali Nagavally was a comical racy entertainer released in May. Oru Naal Varum, directed by T. K Rajeev Kumar, scripted by Sreenivasan and produced by Maniyanpilla Raju, was a social satire about corruption in India. It reunited the much-adored classic combo of Mohanlal-Sreenivasan onscreen. His next film was Shikkar, a dark revenge thriller directed by M. Padmakumar, in which he played a lorry driver who is haunted by his past. The film topped at the Ramzan box office. It was followed by Kandahar, a war film directed by Major Ravi, based on the hijacking of Indian Airlines Flight 814 in 1999. Mohanlal reprised the role of Major Mahadevan in the film. It was the third installment in the Major Mahadevan film series, and the debut Malayalam film of Amitabh Bachchan.

Mohanlal's first release in 2011 was the multi-starrer Christian Brothers, an action drama directed by Joshiy and scripted by Udayakrishna-Siby K. Thomas, in which he co-starred with Suresh Gopi, Dileep and Sarath Kumar. Released worldwide in March across 300 screens, which was the largest release for a Malayalam film at the time, this racy film was a commercial success and one of the top grossing Malayalam films of the year. His Vishu (April) release was China Town, another multi-starrer in which he co-starred with Jayaram and Dileep, which was a comedy film directed by Rafi Mecartin. Despite mixed reviews, the film ran over 100 days and became one of the highest-grossing Malayalam films of the year. He starred in Pranayam, released in August, an off-beat romantic drama directed by Blessy. It was a love story between three aged characters played by Mohanlal, Anupam Kher and Jayapradha. The film was highly acclaimed by critics and Mohanlal's performance as Mathews was well appreciated. His next film Snehaveedu, was directed by Sathyan Anthikkadu, a family film in the background of a village in Palakkad. For the first time, actress Sheela shared screen space with Mohanlal. She played his mother. Snehaveedu is credited as his 300th film. The film was a hit. His last movie that year was Oru Marubhoomikkadha, directed by Priyadarshan, which was an action comedy thriller entirely set in the Middle East. It marked the return of the Priyadarshan-Mohanlal-Mukesh combo of the late 1980s and 90s. The film performed well at the Christmas-New Year's box office.

In 2012, he acted in six films. His first release was the much hyped big-budget romantic thriller film Casanovva, directed by Rosshan Andrrews and written by Bobby-Sanjay. He enacted the role of Casanova, a serial womaniser and the owner of Casanova's Eternal Spring – an international chain of flower boutiques. Later, he appeared in a cameo role in the Bollywood movie Tezz, which was released in April and directed by Priyadarshan. His next film was the B. Unnikrishnan-directorial Grandmaster, a neo-noir crime thriller about a cop who is forced to investigate a series of murders. Mohanlal's well-tempered, calm and subdued acting was appreciated by the critics. Produced by UTV Motion Pictures, it was the first Malayalam film to be released through Netflix, and made available in the United States and Canada. Spirit, directed by Ranjith, talked about the increasing habit of alcoholism in Kerala. The film was exempted from the entertainment tax by the state government for creating social awareness in the society. The film completed a 125-day theatrical run in Kerala and became a commercial success. Run Baby Run, released during the Onam festival, was a comedy thriller directed by Joshiy. It featured the news media as the background. The film was well appreciated by critics, remarking that it was as an example of a well-crafted thriller. It became one of the highest-grossing Malayalam films of the year. The year ended with the Christmas release Karmayodha, directed by Major Ravi, an action thriller in which he played Mad Maddy, an encounter specialist who is assigned to investigate the disappearance of a teenage school girl in Mumbai. The film dealt with the discrimination against women.

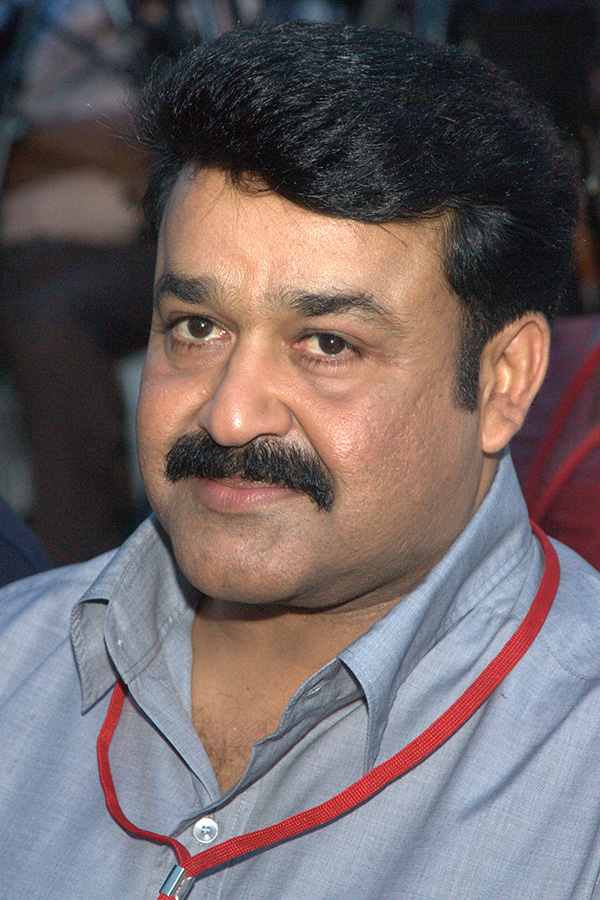
Mohanlal at the 17th International Film Festival of Kerala in 2012

2013 was a remarkable year for Mohanlal, it was the year in which the all-time blockbuster of Malayalam film, Drishyam released. His first film of the year was Lokpal, a vigilante thriller in which he played a vigilante nicknamed "Lokpal". It was directed by Joshiy and written by S. N. Swamy. Red Wine, directed by Salam Bappu, was a non-linear investigation thriller based on a political murder. Ladies and Gentleman, directed by Siddique, was a romantic comedy film set in the backdrop of IT companies. Geethaanjali, a horror thriller directed by Priyadarsan, was a spin-off of the Malayalam classic film Manichitrathazhu, in which he reprised the role of Dr. Sunny from the original. His last release was Drishyam, directed by Jeethu Joseph. It grossed ₹62 crore worldwide and became the highest-grossing Malayalam film ever, until 2016.

In 2014, he starred in the Tamil action-drama Jilla, alongside Vijay, directed by R. T. Neason and produced by R. B. Choudary. The film was a commercial success, grossing over ₹85 crore worldwide, and completed 100 days theatrical run in Chennai, Tamil Nadu. Mohanlal's first Malayalam release of 2014 was Mr. Fraud, a heist film directed by B. Unnikrishnan. He appeared in an extended cameo role in his next film Koothara, directed by Srinath Rajendran, a coming-of-age mystery film set in an untold period. He played a mysterious character in the experimental film, who at the end of the film revealed himself as a merman. His next was the comical political satire film Peruchazhi, written and directed by Arun Vaidyanathan. He played a young political kingmaker who is assigned to make a candidate for governor win the California state gubernatorial elections, where he uses standard Indian political gimmicks to win the election in the USA.

In 2015, his first release was the Kannada film Mythri. His performance as the revenge-seeking DRDO (Defence Research and Development Organisation) scientist Mahadev was well appreciated by the critics. His first Malayalam release was with a cameo appearance in Rasam. Ennum Eppozhum, directed by Sathyan Anthikad was his first leading role in the year, co-starring Manju Warrier. The film was a success at the box office. It was followed by the action thriller Lailaa O Lailaa, directed by Joshiy, both of which failed critically and commercially at the box office. His next was the Ranjith directorial thriller Loham. Though it met with mixed critical reactions, the film was a commercial success. The revenge thriller Kanal was his last in the year. It also received mixed reviews from critics.

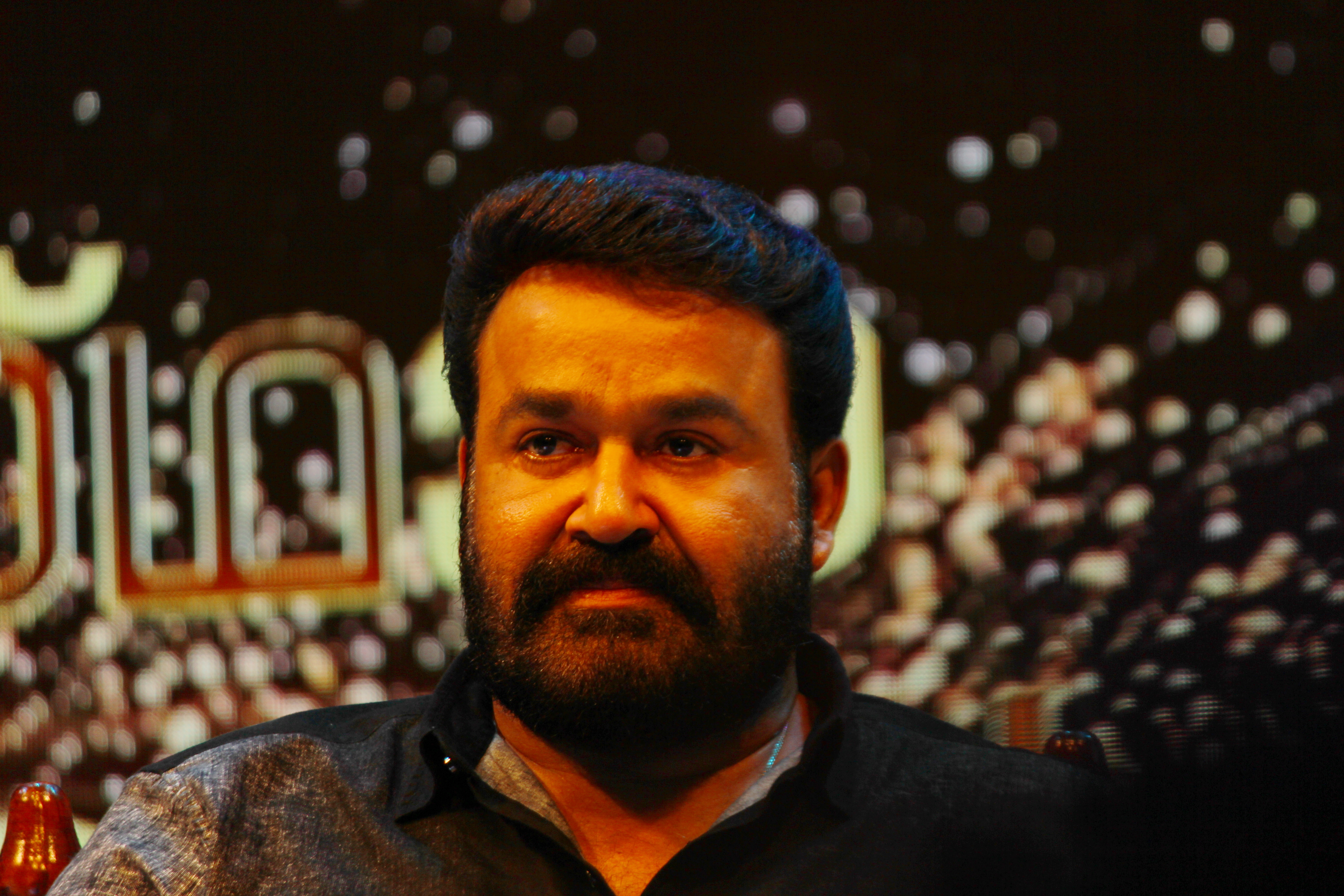
At 48th Kerala State Film Awards ceremony

=== Career progression and commercial fluctuations (2016–2024) ===
In 2016, Mohanlal had four releases, which had a combined gross collection of ₹378 crore worldwide, making him fourth (behind Aamir Khan, Akshay Kumar, and Salman Khan) among the top Indian actors with highest box office receipts in the year, and in top position among South Indian actors. His first release in the year was the Telugu film Manamantha, a family drama directed by Chandra Sekhar Yeleti. For this film, he dubbed in Telugu. His following release was another Telugu film Janatha Garage, an action drama directed by Koratala Siva. It became the highest-grossing Telugu film of 2016 and one of the highest-grossing Telugu films, with a gross collection of over ₹135 crore worldwide. His first Malayalam release that year was the crime-thriller Oppam, directed by Priyadarshan in which he played a blind man. The film became one of the highest-grossing Malayalam film of 2016. It crossed the ₹50 crore mark at the box office within one-and-a-half months, and grossed over ₹65 crore worldwide. He acted as a hunter in his following release, the action film Pulimurugan, his last release of the year. It became the highest-grossing Malayalam film ever and is the first Malayalam film to gross over ₹100 crore at the box office. The film has so far collected ₹152 crore worldwide. The film received positive response for his performance and Paresh C. Palicha stated, "It is Mohanlal's calibre as an actor that makes this thriller a really thrilling experience." The next year in 2017, he acted in Munthirivallikal Thalirkkumbol (2016) which grossed 50 crore at the box office. He then appeared in 1971: Beyond Borders directed by Major Ravi and was based on the 1971 India-Pakistan war. He played dual roles of Colonel Mahadevan and Major Sahadevan. The next film he acted in was Velipadinte Pusthakam directed by Lal Jose in their first collaboration. It was followed by the action thriller Villain directed by B. Unnikrishnan. It was his last release of the year and became one of his highest-grossing film.

In 2018, Mohanlal did cameo appearances in Aadhi and Kayamkulam Kochunni, where he played Ithikkara Pakki, a robber contemporary to Kochunni. His next two releases, Neerali and Drama failed at the box office. Mohanlal then acted in the fantasy drama film Odiyan, directed by V. A. Shrikumar Menon, based on the legend of the Odiyan clan. The film emerged as one of the highest-grossing Malayalam film and was his only box office success in 2018. Mohanlal played a crime syndicate leader in his first film of 2019, Lucifer, directed by Prithviraj Sukumaran. Lakshana. N. Palat of India Today stated, "Lucifer is like Mohanlal fanfiction brought to life on-screen. If you swear by Mohanlal, go for it." One of the highest-grossing Malayalam film of all time, it earned over ₹200 crore, which includes box office collections and the earnings from the sale of its satellite rights, digital streaming rights and TV rights in other languages. He then appeared in Ittymaani: Made in China, which was a moderate success. He then played the Prime Minister in the Tamil film Kaappaan, a commercial success. His only film in 2020 was Big Brother, where he played an ex-criminal who return to his family post his release from prison.

Mohanlal reprised his role in the sequel Drishyam 2, directed by Jeethu Joseph, which released on Amazon Prime in 2021. Haricharan Pudippedi noted, "Mohanlal brings a restrained performance to Georgekutty's character. He seems to be a much calmer man this time around but nobody has a clue about what's brewing in his mind." He then played a Muslim warrior Kunjali Marakkar IV in Marakkar: Lion of the Arabian Sea, which underperformed at the box office. It also won a National Film Award. His first film in 2022 was Bro Daddy, where he played a joyous father to Prithviraj Sukumaran. Janani K. stated, "Mohanlal is a hoot in this film. His minute expressions and his comic timing are impeccable." His next two releases Aaraattu and Monster were box office failures. He then appeared in12th Man, which released digitally on Disney+ Hotstar. In 2023, Mohanlal's first film Alone, was a box office flop. He then did a cameo in the Tamil film Jailer. Mohanlal then played an advocate in Neru, which emerged as the second highest-grossing Malayalam film of the year. S. R. Praveen stated that Mohanlal is back to form with "an understated performance". Both his films in 2024: Malaikottai Vaaliban and Barroz 3D flopped at the box office, leading to a series of commercial failures for Mohanlal.

=== Further success and resurgence (2025–present) ===
Mohanlal's career resurged in 2025. He first reprised his role in the sequel L2: Empuraan. Ganesh Aaglave of Firstpost noted, "Mohanlal is expected to be brilliant, and he is, without any doubt. He oozes swag and beautifully expresses each emotion with a subtle yet impactful mood." A commercial success, it emerged as the highest-grossing Malayalam film of the year. He then played a taxi driver in Thudarum. Latha Srinivasan of Hindustan Times noted, "Mohanlal is in top-form and every scene he is in showcases the great actor that he is." Following Thudarum, Mohanlal played Sandeep, who is living with a heart transplant and is coaxed to attend the engagement of the daughter of the colonel whose heart he received in the movie, Hridayapoorvam. The film became a box office success and along with L2: Empuraan and Thudarum, Hridayapoorvam became one of the highest-grossing Malayalam films worldwide. He later made an extended cameo in Bha Bha Ba, and reprised his cameo role in Jailer 2.

== Other projects ==
=== Stage performances ===
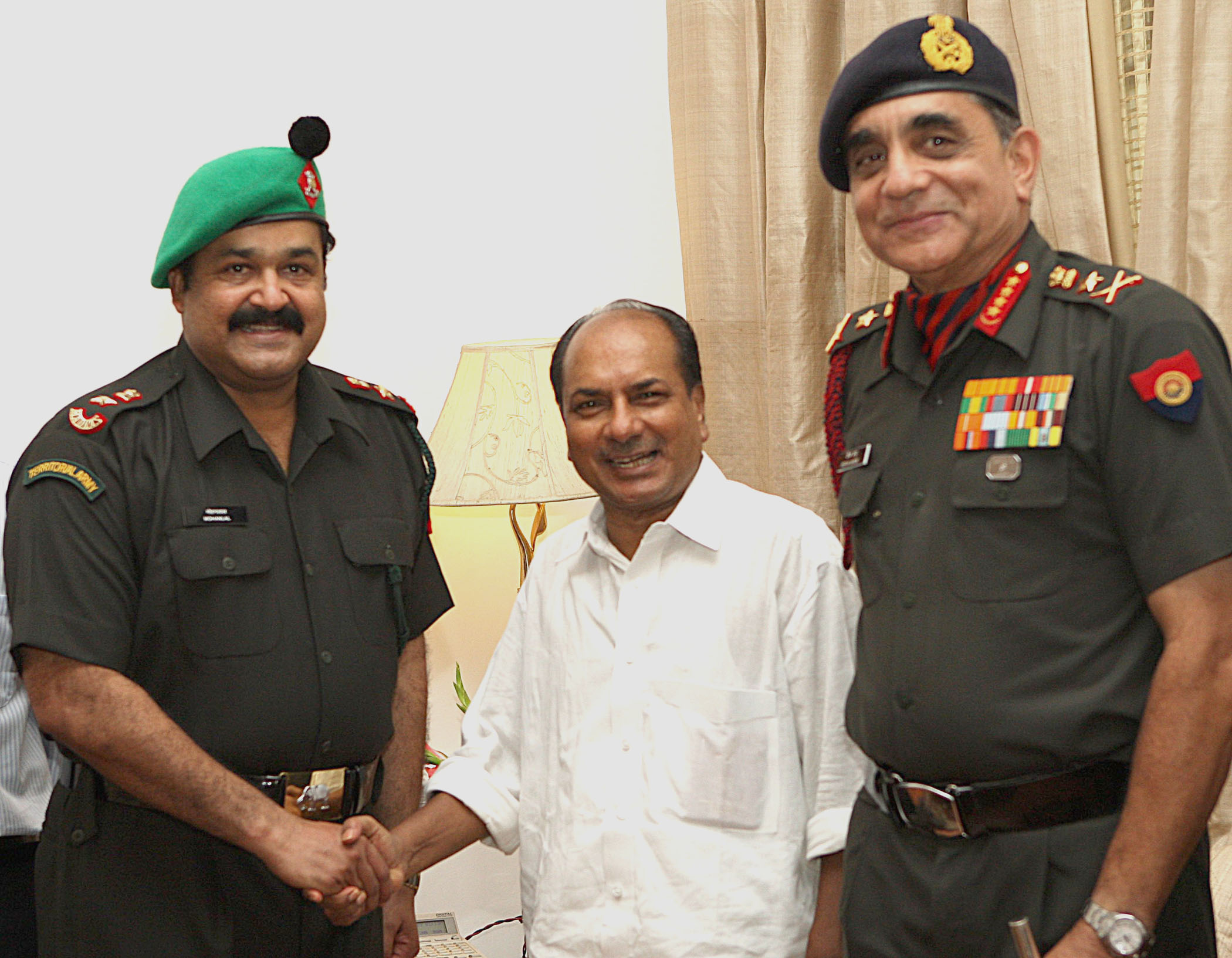
Mohanlal with the then Defence Minister of India, A. K. Antony after joining the Indian Territorial Army

Mohanlal had acted in several amateur plays before entering into films. In 2001, he debuted in professional drama playing Karna (a character from the Indian epic Mahabharata) in Karnabharam, a Sanskrit-language play directed by Kavalam Narayana Panicker. It premiered at the Siri Fort Auditorium in New Delhi on 29 March 2001 as part of the National Theatre Festival of the National School of Drama. The play depicts Karna's mental agony a day before the Kurukshetra War, as he thinks about his past and his faith. Mohanlal said: "You cannot compare Kavalam's play with the amateur plays I did. Though there are other characters in the play, the theme revolves around Karna. It is almost like a solo performance. Some of the scenes are really touching and challenging". He acted without payment, saying: "I performed for the joy of it ... for my love of our history".

Kadhayattam was a presentation enacted by Mohanlal, performing ten classic characters and situations from Malayalam literature, selected from ten Malayalam novels written by O. Chandu Menon, C. V. Raman Pillai, S. K. Pottekkatt, Thakazhi Sivasankara Pillai, P. Kesavadev, Vaikom Muhammad Basheer, Uroob, O. V. Vijayan, M. Mukundan, and M. T. Vasudevan Nair over a 100-year period. The play, directed by T. K. Rajeev Kumar premiered at the Senate Hall of University of Kerala on 1 November 2003, and later was staged in Kozhikode, Bangalore, Chennai and Delhi. In 2008, Mohanlal along with Mukesh performed in Chayamukhi, written and directed by Prasanth Narayanan. Mohanlal and Mukesh portrayed Bheeman and Keechakan respectively, the characters from Mahabharata. It had a play within a play narrative style. It premiered at the Lulu International Convention Centre in Thrissur on 12 March 2008, and later was staged in Thiruvananthapuram, Bangalore, Kollam, Kochi, and Kozhikode. A critic from The Hindu wrote: "Chayamukhi is, arguably, the finest work on Malayalam stage in recent times". In the same year, Mohanlal voiced Hanuman in the English ballet Maya Ravan, directed by Shobana.

In 2014, Mohanlal and musician Ratheesh Vegha formed the music band Lalisom - The Lal Effect. Its maiden show was at the 2015 National Games of India. The band drew flak from social media initially for charging an amount of ₹1.63 crore and later for lip-syncing. Following the criticism, Mohanlal returned the amount to the government, which they refused stating that the government's morality would not allow them to take back the money and Mohanlal had not personally benefited from the amount which he received, since it was meant to meet the stage expenses and remuneration for the artistes. Despite that, Mohanlal did not take back the money he dispatched.

In 2015, he collaborated once again with Mukesh for Naga, but this time as the narrator. The play, based on Girish Karnad's Kannada play Nagamandala, was directed by Suveeran. Naga was a combination of myth, superstition, fact, and fantasy. It was premiered at the Parish Hall of St. George Church, Kalady on 9 August 2015.

=== Goodwill and brand ambassador ===
Mohanlal has been a goodwill ambassador for the government and other nonprofit organisations, mainly for public service ads and humanitarian causes. In March 2007, he was made the goodwill ambassador of the AIDS awareness campaign by Kerala AIDS Control Society, for which he acted in short awareness videos. In October 2009, Mohanlal was appointed as the goodwill ambassador of Kerala State Athletics by the Kerala State Athletics Association. In March 2010, Mohanlal accepted the plea of the Department of Industries and Commerce of the Government of Kerala to be designated as the goodwill ambassador of Kerala's handloom industries. In July 2015, the Government of Kerala made him the Goodwill ambassador of "Subhayatra 2015", a project developed to create awareness about traffic rules. He was appointed as the Goodwill ambassador of "Mrithasanjeevani" in September 2016, another project by the Government of Kerala aimed at promoting organ donation in the state. In January 2021, he was appointed as the goodwill ambassador of the tuberculosis eradication campaign by the Kerala government's health department.

He has also appeared in several television commercials and advertisements for Malabar Gold and Diamonds, Oceanus etc. Mohanlal was the first movie star in India to endorse the ubiquitous dhoti after he was made the brand ambassador of MCR in 2001. MCR manufactured 30,000 coloured dhotis which had been featured in the film Narasimham (2000), which was a market success. He continues to be the chief brand ambassador of MCR. Mohanlal signed as the brand ambassador of Kanan Devan in 2002, a tea brand owned by the Tata Global Beverages. His contract was renewed after its rebranding in 2014. In July 2010, LG Electronics India enlisted Mohanlal for the endorsement of the brand's Onam festival offers for Kerala customers lasting till September 2010. In the same year, he was signed as the brand ambassador in the state for Manappuram Finance Ltd., a non-banking financial company. Mohanlal endorsed the coconut oil brand KLF Coconad in 2013.

In September 2013, the direct-broadcast satellite television provider Tata Sky announced Mohanlal as its brand endorser for its Kerala market. Mohanlal, along with Milkha Singh and P. T. Usha were the brand ambassadors of the event Kochi International Half Marathon in 2013, a half marathon organised by Kochi Municipal Corporation and Push Integrated Communication Pvt Ltd., He continued in its second edition in 2014, along with cricketer Harbhajan Singh. In May 2016, as part of expanding its market to the South Indian audience, the entertainment company Hotstar, which is a platform for streaming media and video on demand, announced Mohanlal as its brand ambassador for its Malayalam contents. He endorsed its six-week multimedia campaign on television, print, outdoor and digital medias.

In 2026, he became the Goodwill ambassador of Kerala State Road Transport Corporation (KSRTC) and acted in an advertisement film directed by Priyadarshan without any payment.

=== Business and other ventures ===
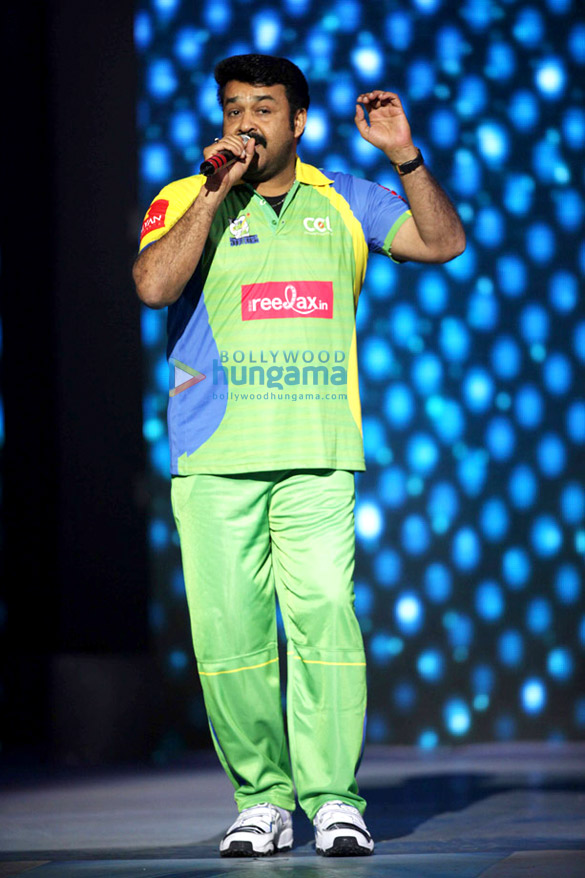
Mohanlal at the opening of CCL 3

Mohanlal has started and associated with several business ventures related to film production and distribution, restaurants and packaged spices among others. He co-owned a production company during the 1980s, Casino, along with Mammootty, I.V. Sasi, Seema and Century Kochumon. The production house produced commercially successful films such as Adiyozhukkukal (1984), Karimpinpoovinakkare (1985), Gandhinagar 2nd Street (1986) and Nadodikkattu (1987). He owns Maxlab Cinemas and Entertainments, a film distribution company. He started Vismayas Max, a film pre and post-production studio headquartered in Trivandrum and a college for dubbing artists at KINFRA Film and Video Park, Trivandrum. The company's management was later taken over by Sohan Roy of Aries Group, which has now been renamed as Aries Vismayas Max. Mohanlal continues to be its brand ambassador. He has produced films under the production house Pranavam Arts International.

He owns restaurants in India and overseas, including a chain in Dubai called Mohanlal's Tastebuds, established in 2002, and a spices, pickles, condiments, and curry powder brand with the same name launched in February 2004 in the Middle East. From 2007, the Eastern Group owns the majority stake in the brand. In 2006, he opened a seafood restaurant named The Harbour Market in Bangalore, and a hotel named Travancore Court in Kochi. His other business ventures include Uniroyal Marine Exports Limited – a Kozhikode-based seafood export company, where he is a non-executive director since 1992. He is the co-founder, partner and chairman of Jose Thomas Performing Arts Centre (JTPac) in Thrippunithura, Kochi, an arts centre for performing arts and music established in 2009. He is an independent director of Clenergen India Private Limited, a company for production and supply of biomass feedstock for biomass gasification.

In 2009, Mohanlal, along with Priyadarshan, tried to bid for an Indian Premier League (IPL) cricket team based in Kochi; they withdrew the bid on failing to source enough funds after a change in rules was introduced. Mohanlal was the captain of the Kerala Strikers team in the Celebrity Cricket League (CCL) held in 2012 and 2013.

=== Escape art ===
In 2008, Mohanlal underwent 18 months of covert escape artist training under magician Gopinath Muthukad to perform a stunt called the "Burning Illusion" in Thiruvananthapuram. However, due to pressure from fans and contemporaries, the act was canceled. The event was jointly organised by the Kerala Police, Department of Tourism, and the Kerala State Youth Welfare Board as part of Vismayam 2008, an international convention of magicians. The stunt involved Mohanlal being handcuffed and wrapped in chains, placed inside a box, and thrown into a ball of fire from which he had to escape.

Magician Samraj advised Mohanlal against the stunt and requesting that he withdraw. AMMA president Innocent also urged Mohanlal to refrain from the risky show. The purpose of the stunt was to inspire youth to overcome challenges in life. Mohanlal acknowledged the 50-50 risk involved but expressed hope for success. Muthukad emphasised that, although fire escape is one of the most dangerous acts, Mohanlal has been practicing to perfect it.

In 2014, Mohanlal performed a risk-free magic at the inaugural function of Magic Planet, a magic-themed complex in Thiruvananthapuram, founded by Muthukad. The chief minister of Kerala, Oommen Chandy, inaugurated the event, and Mohanlal's act involved levitating a girl.

== Media image and artistry ==
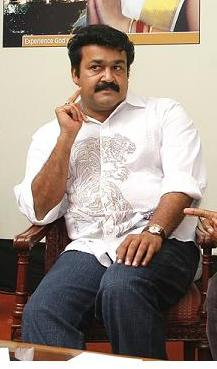
Mohanlal at a book unveiling ceremony in 2006

Mohanlal has been described in the Indian media as one of the most versatile actors and has been lauded for his natural acting style. Mohanlal is also known by his pet name "Lalettan". Reader's Digest India described him in 2004 as "cinema's jack of all trades and master of many". He was also listed 80th in India's Most Trusted Persons, in a survey conducted by Reader's Digest in 2010. Director Ram Gopal Varma has described Mohanlal as "one of the finest actors in the country who can slip into any role easily". The actor has often been praised by his contemporaries in the Indian film industry, for his contributions to Malayalam cinema.

In 2003, on the 25th anniversary of Mohanlal's film career, a week-long celebration and a stage show were held in Thiruvananthapuram, by his fans and friends. The proceeds from the stage show were donated to charity. Malayalam television channels Asianet and Surya TV also held separate stage shows to celebrate the anniversary.

During the 1980s, Mohanlal and Mammootty emerged as "superstars" in Malayalam cinema, marking an unprecedented phenomenon in the industry. This led to a shift in the Malayalam film landscape, with star-driven films becoming the norm, reminiscent of Bollywood and Tamil film cultures. As India Today noted in 1988, filmmakers tailored characters to suit the actors. Director I. V. Sasi remarked that even Prem Nazir never had the popularity of Mohanlal and Mammootty, who possess "a rare and right mixture of charisma and acting ability". In 1988, filmmaker Fazil stated that, "Mohanlal is the most flexible and subtle actor in the country today. He can do what Dustin Hoffman did in Tootsie or Silvester Stallone did in Rambo with ease".

In 2005, the films of Mohanlal, Mammootty, and Dileep accounted for 95 percent of the box office gross in Malayalam cinema. The Hindu wrote that "Malayalam cinema revolves around them and scripts are written keeping their age and image in mind", they played larger-than-life characters with distinctive style of attire, dialogues, dance, and fight sequences. Mohanlal's many fan clubs which are present throughout Kerala help in creating a buzz around new releases and ensure a good opening in movie screens, a crucial factor to the success of films in Kerala. In 2007, some social activists protested against Mohanlal for appearing in a whisky commercial, to which he responded that it is unfair to single him out when so many other Indian actors do the same.

In 2012, the forest department filed a case against Mohanlal under the Wildlife Protection Act, 1972 for possessing elephant tusks discovered during an income tax raid at his home. Subsequently, the tusks were returned to Mohanlal. Various petitions were dismissed in lower courts and the High Court of Kerala, alleging favouritism by the state government and department officials towards Mohanlal, and demanding a thorough investigation into the matter. In 2013, dismissing a petition, the High Court concluded that "there was nothing to show that the State government or its officers had acted in favour of the actor. Besides, the petitioner had not been able to point out any illegality or irregularities in the investigation". Similarly, in 2014, the High Court dismissed a Public Interest Litigation (PIL) and criticised the petitioner, stating that "there is no public interest in the petition, but it is aimed only at publicity".

Mohanlal's performance in Bharatham was listed among the "25 Greatest Acting Performances of Indian cinema" by Forbes India, on the occasion of celebrating 100 years of Indian Cinema. His performance in Drishyam is regarded as one of the "100 Greatest Performances of the Decade" by Film Companion. In 2024, he was placed 48th on IMDb's List of 100 Most Viewed Indian Stars.

== Personal life ==
Mohanlal married Suchitra, daughter of the Tamil film producer K. Balaji, on 28 April 1988. The couple has two children – Pranav Mohanlal and Vismaya Mohanlal. Pranav has acted in a few films, debuting in Mohanlal's Onnaman (2001). Mohanlal did not object when his son expressed a desire to act, as "kids may have many such ambitions. If we can help them realise something, what is the problem?." He resides in Kochi, where he owns houses at Thevara, Elamakkara and Kundannoor. He also owns houses in Chennai, his hometown Thiruvananthapuram, Ooty, Mahabalipuram, a villa in Arabian Ranches and a flat in the Burj Khalifa in Dubai. Mohanlal is a self-described foodie. He also enjoys melodious music. Mohanlal is a strong believer in destiny and spirituality. He describes himself as a religious and spiritual person, and likes to read Osho, J. Krishnamurti, Aurobindo and Ramana Maharshi.

== Filmography and discography ==
Mohanlal's career spans four decades, during which he has acted in over 325 films and produced and co-produced films under three production houses—Casino Films, Cheers Films, and Pranavam Arts International. He works predominantly in Malayalam cinema, his acting credits also include some Bollywood, Tamil, Telugu and Kannada films. Mohanlal has occasionally acted in some professional plays and has also appeared in a few short films. He has recorded over 31 songs, most of them for the films in which he has acted. In television, Mohanlal is the host of the reality show Bigg Boss on Asianet, since the start of the first season.

== Accolades ==
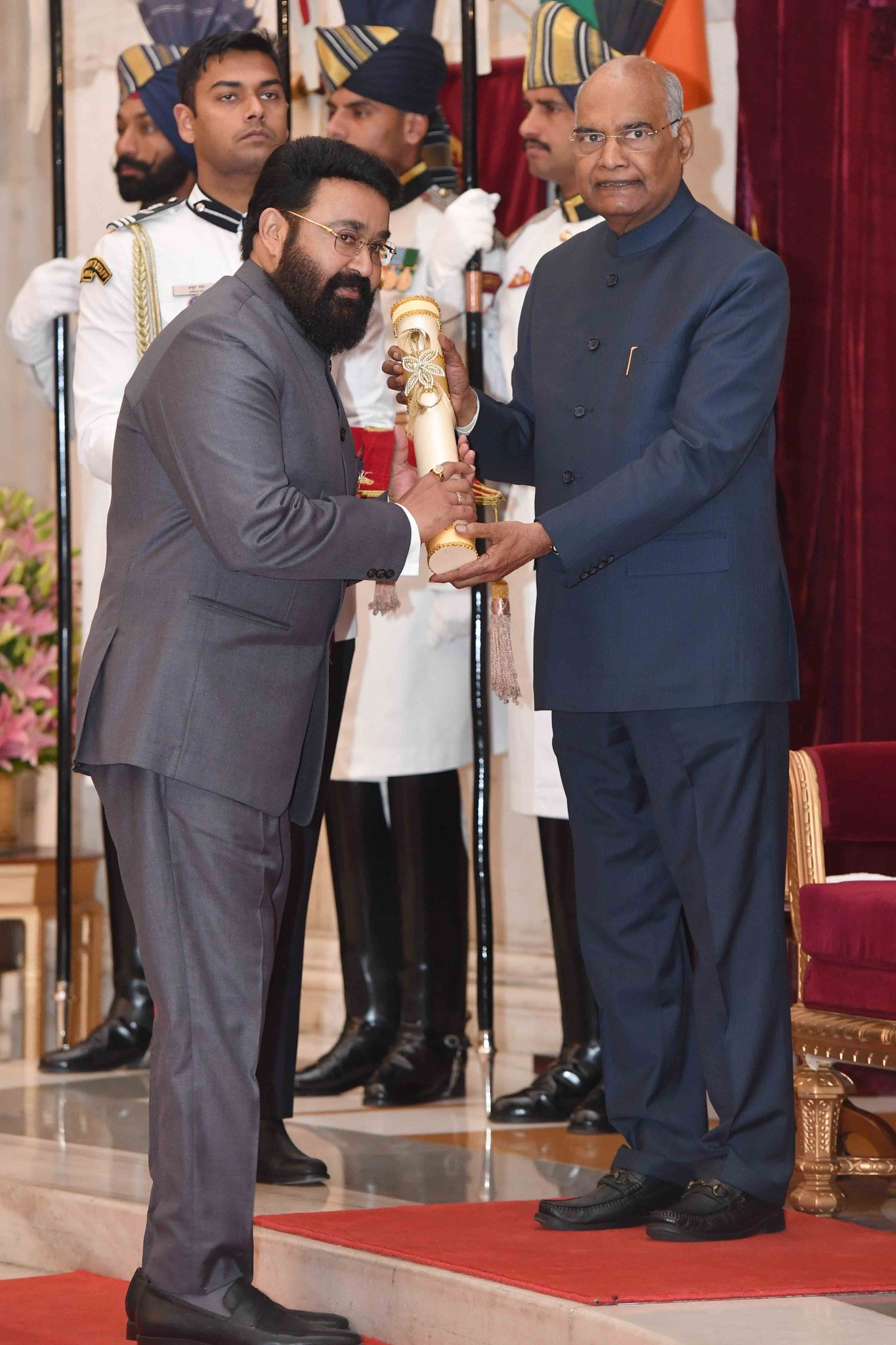
Mohanlal receiving Padma Bhushan from Ram Nath Kovind, the then President of India

In a career spanning nearly forty years, Mohanlal has received numerous accolades and honours both competitive and honorary, among them are five National Film Awards, nine Kerala State Film Awards and Filmfare Awards South. The Government of India honoured him with Padma Shri, India's fourth-highest civilian honour in 2001 and Padma Bhushan, the third-highest civilian honour in 2019, for his contributions to the arts. In 2025, the Government of India felicitated him with the Dadasaheb Phalke Award, the highest accolade in the field of Indian cinema, at the 71st National Film Awards. He was conferred with honorary Doctor of Letters by Sree Sankaracharya University of Sanskrit in 2010, and the University of Calicut in 2018.

In 2008, while filming for Kurukshetra, in which he plays an Indian Army officer, Mohanlal expressed his interest to join the Territorial Army of India. But he could not, as men above the age of 42 are not eligible to join the volunteer force. On 9 July 2008, he was formally inducted to the Territorial Army in the honorary rank of lieutenant colonel by then Army Chief Deepak Kapoor. He is the first actor to receive the honour. In 2012, he was bestowed with an honorary title of Black belt in Taekwondo from Kukkiwon, South Korea. He is the first South Indian actor to be honoured with the title.
