= Aattakalasam =

- Poster
- Directed by: J. Sasikumar
- Written by: Salim Cherthala
- Produced by: Joy Thomas
- Starring: Mohanlal; Prem Nazir; Lakshmi
- Cinematography: N. A. Thara
- Edited by: K. Sankunni
- Music by: Raveendran
- Production company: Jubilee Productions
- Distributed by: Jubilee Productions
- Release date: 11 November 1983
- Running time: 140 minutes
- Country: India
- Language: Malayalam

Aattakalasam (transl. The concluding act) is a 1983 Indian Malayalam-language family drama film directed by J. Sasikumar, written by Salim Cherthala, and produced by Joy Thomas. The film stars Mohanlal, Prem Nazir, and Lakshmi. The film features music composed by Raveendran. Aattakalasam was a blockbuster at the box office.

== Plot ==
Balachandran is a respected police officer and devout family man to his wife Indu and their three little children. He also has a younger brother Babu, a young doctor who loves his brother and sister-in-law more than anything. Their house caretaker is Kumaran, a changed double-homicide convict, who stands as the manifestation of Balachandran's gentle heart. Together they lead a happy life.

One evening, Babu meets his gang of friends who urge him to go to a bar, on their insistence he drinks alcohol for the first time. The drunk gang enjoys a cabaret at the bar, Babu gets seduced by the dancer. An inebriated Babu returns home late night and chances upon Indu, who reminds him of the sensual exotic dancer, and forcibly grabs her. Babu gets back to his senses when she slaps him. Balachandran arrives and sees him leaving the room and Indu with her half stripped clothes. His rage-filled state of mind imagines his brother is having an affair with his wife, thereby throwing Babu out of his house.

Ashamed at his actions, Babu sits alone nearby a carnival location, where he is found by Marykutty and her mother when Babu saves Marykutty from a local goon named Rappayi. Taking him as a vagabond, they invite him to their village. Babu finds solace in a their seaside fishing village. Marykutty has a crush for Babu. Her brother Josekutty and Babu become good friends. At the village, he develops a reputation as a doctor and opens a clinic. It irks Dr. Rajappan who was the sole doctor there. He and Rappayi form a pact to defame Babu. They execute several ideas but fail.

Meanwhile, Balachandran's uncle, aunt and their daughter Usha come to their home to stay for few days. He completely ignores Indu and children and even suspects his youngest son's biological father could be Babu. To save his reputation, he has not revealed their issue to anyone else and allows them to stay in the house but stays poles apart. Knowing there's some issue between them, uncle, aunt and Usha scheme to take advantage of the situation, Usha is taken with luring Balachandran and she succeeds. Balachandran mistreats and humiliates Indu in every way possible and openly flirts with Usha.

Babu is ambushed by Rappayi, Rajappan and fellow goons, he gets fatally stabbed. Rappayi is lynched to death by the villagers and Babu is hospitalised. Balachandran realises his mistake when he figures out that the girl and her mother were only after his money, and patches things up with Indu after reading a letter from Babu revealing what actually happened on that night. Their happiness is short-lived, as Babu dies peacefully with Balachandran and Indu by his side, knowing that his mistake is finally undone.

== Cast ==
- Mohanlal as Dr. Santhosh Babu, a young physician
- Prem Nazir as S.P C. K. Balachandran IPS, Babu's elder brother
- Lakshmi as Indu, Balachandran's wife
- Sukumari as Ammayi
- Jagathy Sreekumar as Josekutty
- Manavalan Joseph as Madhava Kurup, uncle
- V. D. Rajappan as Dr. V. D. Rajappan
- Achankunju as Kumaran, house caretaker
- Anuradha as Usha, Kurup's daughter
- Chithra as Marykutty
- Kunchan as Fisherman
- Meena as Marykutty's mother
- Santhakumari as Naniyamma, house maid
- T. G. Ravi as Rappayi, a local goon
- Prathapachandran as Indu's father
- Silk Smitha as Cabaret dancer
- M. G. Soman as C.I Vijayan (Cameo appearance)
- Cochin Haneefa as Kuttappan (Cameo appearance)
- Raveendran as Vikas, Babu's friend (Cameo appearance)

== Soundtrack ==
The music was composed by Raveendran and the lyrics were written by Poovachal Khader.

No.	Song	Singers	Lyrics	Length
1	"Malarum Kiliyum Oru"	K. J. Yesudas, Chorus	Poovachal Khader	
2	"Naanamaavunno Meninovunno"	K. J. Yesudas, Vani Jairam	Poovachal Khader	
3	"Njan Rajanithan Kusumam"	S. Janaki	Poovachal Khader	
4	"Thengum Hridayam"	K. J. Yesudas	Poovachal Khader	
