= Thiranottam =

1978 film by ASHOK KUMAR

- Directed by: V. Ashok Kumar
- Written by: V. Ashok Kumar; Pachalloor Sasi
- Produced by: Pachalloor Sasi
- Starring: Mohanlal; Ravikumar; C. Chandramohan; Maniyanpilla Raju; Renu Chandra
- Cinematography: S. Kumar
- Music by: M. G. Radhakrishnan
- Production company: Mrithyunjaya Films
- Release date: 2005
- Country: India
- Language: Malayalam

Thiranottam (transl. Retrospect) is a 1978-made Indian Malayalam drama film directed by V. Ashok Kumar and written by Kumar and Pachalloor Sasi. The film stars Mohanlal, C. Chandramohan, Ravikumar, Maniyanpilla Raju, and Renu Chandra in their debut roles. In the film, Mohanlal played Kuttappan, a mentally disabled servant.

The film was completed and censored in 1978, but was not released immediately. It was released in a single theatre in 2005 in Kollam. Thiranottam is known for being the acting debut of Mohanlal, then 18 years old, even though his onscreen debut was Manjil Virinja Pookkal (1980).

== Plot ==
Thiranottam is the tale of Kuttappan, a mentally disabled servant and the life around him.

== Cast ==
- Mohanlal as Kuttappan
- C. Chandramohan
- Ravikumar
- Maniyanpilla Raju
- Sathaar
- Renu Chandra
- Ajith Rajagopal

== Production ==
Thiranottam marks Mohanlal's acting debut in cinema. His first shot took place on 3 September 1978 at 11:30 AM in front of Mohanlal's house in Mudavanmugal, Thiruvananthapuram. He was 18 years old then and was studying in college. Mohanlal played Kuttappan, a mentally disabled servant. Currently, the print of the film belongs to a television channel, who have bought the satellite rights of the film. The film was completed and censored, but could not release then. After more than 25 years, the film was telecast on Asianet. Their plan was to make a Tamil film after Thiranottam and had even recorded music for it, but before that could happen, Mohanlal won the audition for the villain role in Manjil Virinja Pookkal (1980) in which he made his onscreen debut.

The film was made by Mohanlal and his friends, Ashok Kumar (director), Late Sasheendran (Producer), Priyadarshan (Asst.director), Suresh Kumar (clap boy) and the cast included Ravi Kumar, Mohanlal, Renu Chandra and Chandra Mohan among others.

Director Priyadarshan and producer Suresh Kumar also debuted in the movie industry through this film. While Priyadarshan worked as assistant director, Suresh Kumar was the clap boy.

In September 2014, Mohanlal appealed on Facebook to trace the child actor who had done the first shot along with him. He mentioned, "There is a boy who shared screen space with me in it. However, I am unable to remember who he was. If any of you know his identity, do come forward and inform me. I really wish to meet him once again." The search ended on a sad note when Prasad Nooranad, a freelance director, found out that the boy in question had since died.

== Soundtrack ==
The film's original soundtrack was composed by M. G. Radhakrishnan, with lyrics written by O. N. V. Kurup. K. J. Yesudas sang two songs.

No.	Title	Singer(s)	Length
1.	"Mannil Vinnil Manassilaake"	K. J. Yesudas
2.	"Poo Hoi"	K. J. Yesudas, Chorus
