= Karimpinpoovinakkare =

- Poster
- Directed by: I. V. Sasi
- Written by: P. Padmarajan
- Produced by: Century Kochumon; Mohanlal; I. V. Sasi; Seema; Mammootty; Raju Mathew
- Starring: Mammootty; Mohanlal; Bharath Gopi; Seema; Urvashi
- Cinematography: N. A. Thara
- Edited by: K. Narayanan
- Music by: Shyam
- Production company: Casino Films
- Distributed by: Century Release
- Release date: 12 November 1985
- Country: India
- Language: Malayalam

Karimpinpoovinakkare is a 1985 Malayalam film written by P. Padmarajan and directed by I. V. Sasi, starring Mammootty, Mohanlal, Bharat Gopy, Seema, and Urvashi. The film revolves around the life and revenge of a few villagers against each other. The film was released on November 12, 1985 during Deepavali.

== Plot ==
The film opens with an illegal cockfighting competition held in a small village in central Kerala. Suddenly police enter and arrest Shivan and Vasu for illegal betting. But on the way, they are saved by village youths under Chellan, a local goon. Both Chellan and Shivan share a strong friendship and are more like brothers. Shivan is in love with Chellan's younger sister Gauri and Chellan and his mother approve of it. Chandri, the sister of Shivan, is his world and his entire happiness revolves around her. Bhadran, the younger brother of Chellan, is very aggressive like him and picks fights for every trivial reason. It is usually Shivan who sorts out the fights that he picks every day.

Things are smooth until one day Chandri becomes pregnant. Chandri, in order to pacify Shivan, reveals to him that it is Chellan who impregnated her, whereas it is actually Thampi, her neighbour. Shivan, in a fit of rage, kills Chellan and surrenders at the police station. Bhadran turns violent with this incident and vows to take revenge.

This event changes the atmosphere in the village and Bhadran is now blind with hatred towards Shivan and his family. Shivan is sentenced to life imprisonment. Thampi then marries Chandri. Bhadran one night kills him and kidnaps Chandri and sells her along with her son to Pappachan, a pimp in the village. Shocked at the cruelty of his revenge, Bhadran's mother curses him and dies. Though shocked over her reaction, Bhadran is not ready to give up his revenge.

Years have passed by. Shivan is released after seven years and arrives in the village. He is a completely transformed man and is now in repentance for killing Chellan, who was more like an elder brother. He pleads Bhadran to reveal where Chandri is now, but Bhadran is not ready as he still holds a grudge. One night, Bhadran is assaulted by his enemies Vasu and Kochappi, but is saved by Shivan. Bhadran however is still resentful towards Shivan. Gauri angrily confronts Bhadran and says if Shivan wasn't there for him, he would have died.

One night, Vasu and Kochappi start tormenting Gauri. Shivan sees this and beats up both wicked men. Bhadran realises that Gauri is right and he informs her that he is going to bring Chandri back home. Bhadran reaches the brothel and asks Pappachan to hand her over. Pappachan doesn't oblige him. Bhadran picks a fight with Pappachan and his goons. Shivan, who was following Bhadran, reaches there and he joins him in facing the goons. In the end, Bhadran is killed by Pappachan. Shivan beats Pappachan and is about to kill him, but stops on the request of Gauri. Bhadran breathes his last in Shivan's arms.

== Cast ==
- Mammootty as Shivan, Chellannan's best friend
- Mohanlal as Bhadran, Chellannan's aggressive and violent younger brother
- Bharath Gopi as Chellannan, a local goon and Shivan's best friend whom the latter killed (Brother of Bhadran & Gauri)
- Seema as Gauri (Sister of Bhadran & Chellannan)
- Urvashi as Chandrika (Sister of Shivan)
- Sukumari as Shivan's and Chandrika's aunt
- Kaviyoor Ponnamma as Bhadran's mother
- Meena as Thampi's mother
- Raveendran as Thampi (Husband of Chandrika)
- Vincent as Police Inspector
- Captain Raju as Pappachan, the main antagonist and evil pimp
- Lalu Alex as Vasu, the secondary antagonist
- Kundara Johnny as Kochappi, the secondary anatagonist and Vasu's sidekick
- Jagannatha Varma as Advocate Aravindakshan
- Maniyanpilla Raju
- Valsala Menon

== Release ==
The film was released on 14 November 1985. The film was commercial success.

== Soundtrack ==
The music was composed by Shyam and the lyrics were written by Bichu Thirumala.

No.	Song	Singers	Lyrics	Length (m:ss)
1	"Airaani Poove"	K. J. Yesudas	Bichu Thirumala	
2	"Karimbin Poovinakkare"	P. Jayachandran, Chorus, Krishnachandran	Bichu Thirumala	
3	"Maancholakkuyile"	K. S. Chithra, P. Jayachandran	Bichu Thirumala	
4	"Thathintha"	P. Jayachandran, Chorus	Bichu Thirumala	
