= JT Pac =

Theater of performing arts in India

- Full name: Jose Thomas Performing Arts Centre
- Location: Tripunithura, Kochi, Kerala, India
- Owner: Mohanlal (Chairman); Jose Thomas (President)
- Capacity: 700
- Type: Theatre
- Events: Theatre, music, dance

Construction
- Opened: February 26, 2009; 17 years ago

Website
- jtpac.org

The Jose Thomas Performing Arts Centre (JT Pac) is a theatre of performing arts situated in Tripunithura, Kochi in the state of Kerala, India. It was founded on 26 February 2009 by actor Mohanlal and The Choice Group chairman Jose Thomas who respectively serves as the chairman and President of the arts centre. The centre is situated in the Choice School complex and has a sitting-capacity of 700.

== Arts ==
The Rhyme by Soorya Krishnamoorthy was the first show played at the theatre and as of 2013 it has organised about 165 shows.

Many notable artists including Pankaj Udhas, Udit Narayan, Shankar Mahadevan, Pandit Hari Prasad Chaurasia, Ustad Amjad Ali Khan, and Naseeruddin Shah have performed at the theatre. In 2009, Mohanlal played Prospero in a Malayalam-language version of The Tempest , and Bhima in a play titled Chayamukhi.

In 2012, the arts centre organised a four-day dance festival titled, Parampara in which Padma Shri recipient Madhavi Mudgal and Bharati Shivaji, Saswati Sen and Rama Vaidyanathan among others performed at the centre.

In 2016, the President of the arts center, Josh Thomas said that the centre is incurring a loss.
