= T. P. Balagopalan M. A. =

- Theatrical release poster
- Directed by: Sathyan Anthikkad
- Screenplay by: Sreenivasan
- Story by: Sathyan Anthikkad
- Produced by: T. K. Balachandran
- Starring: Mohanlal; Shobana; Balan K. Nair; Kuthiravattam Pappu; Maniyanpilla Raju; Sreenivasan; Sukumari; K. P. A. C. Lalitha
- Cinematography: Vipin Mohan
- Edited by: K. Narayanan
- Music by: A. T. Ummer
- Production company: Ajay Arts
- Distributed by: Evershine Release
- Release date: 11 February 1986
- Running time: 130 minutes
- Country: India
- Language: Malayalam

T. P. Balagopalan M. A. is a 1986 Indian Malayalam-language comedy drama film directed by Sathyan Anthikkad and written by Sreenivasan from a story by Anthikkad. It stars Mohanlal in the title role, along with Shobana, Balan K. Nair, Kuthiravattam Pappu, Maniyanpilla Raju, Sreenivasan, Sukumari, and K. P. A. C. Lalitha. The story follows T. P. Balagopalan, who struggles to make ends meet, and his romantic life with Anitha.

The film won two Kerala State Film Awards—Best Actor for Mohanlal and Best Story for Anthikkad. This marks Mohanlal's first Kerala State Film Award for Best Actor and his first Best Actor award in his filmography.

== Plot ==
The film revolves around T. P. Balagopalan/Balan, a low-scale employee at Falcon Products, who is a kind hearted, caring and humble young gentleman. He owns some land which his elder sister and her husband are trying to grab from him. He falls in love with a school teacher, Anitha, whom he meets in one of his marketing trysts for Falcon Products.

Balan loses his land when he tries to help Anitha's father in a litigation. He also loses his job due to labor union issues. His younger sister, not being able to get married in a traditional arranged marriage setup, marries his friend, Narayanankutty. His elder sister and family leave his house when they learn that he no longer owns any land.

Meanwhile, Anitha's father wins the court case and becomes rich. He returns Balan's money but refuses to acknowledge his love with Anitha. He tries to get her married off to the lawyer who represented him before the High Court and won the case for him. This upsets Balan greatly and he starts badmouthing Anitha's father. However, Anitha runs away on the day of her wedding to live with Balan. In the end, Balan, Anitha, and Balan's grandmother happily start living in his hometown.

== Cast ==
- Mohanlal as Balagopalan/Balan, the protagonist.
- Shobana as Anitha, an elementary school teacher and Balagopalan's girlfriend.
- Balan K. Nair as Hariharan, Anitha's father
- Sukumari as Lathika, Anitha's mother
- Adoor Bhavani as Radhika, Balagopalan's grandmother
- Kuthiravattam Pappu as Chandrankutty, Balagopalan's brother-in-law
- K. P. A. C. Lalitha as Latha, Balagopalan's Elder Sister
- Sreenivasan as Advocate Ramakrishnan, Krishnankutty Nair's lawyer
- Uma Bharani as Devi, Balagopalan's younger sister
- Maniyanpilla Raju as Narayanankutty, Balagopalan's friend
- Kothuku Nanappan as Kannappan
- Suresh Gopi as Man arranged to wed Devi
- Priyadarshan as in a cameo appearance as a film director
- Mukesh as in a cameo appearance as a film actor
- Baby Chaithanya

== Soundtrack ==
The music was composed by A. T. Ummer, and the lyrics were written by Sathyan Anthikkad.

No.	Song	Singer(s)	Lyrics	Length
1	"Nakshathraraajyathe"	K. J. Yesudas, Chorus	Sathyan Anthikkad	
2	"Oro Poovilum"	K. J. Yesudas	Sathyan Anthikkad	

== Awards ==
Kerala State Film Awards

- Best Actor - Mohanlal
- Best Story - Sathyan Anthikkad
