= Ulsavapittennu =

1988 Malayalam-Language Indian film

- Poster
- Directed by: Bharath Gopi
- Written by: John Paul
- Produced by: K. V. Abraham (Thomsun Babu)
- Starring: Mohanlal; Parvathy Jayaram; Devan; Sukumaran; Jayaram
- Cinematography: Vasanthkumar
- Edited by: B. Lenin
- Music by: G. Devarajan
- Production company: Thomsun Films
- Distributed by: Thomsun Release
- Release date: 23 December 1988
- Country: India
- Language: Malayalam

Ulsavapittennu (transl. The day after ulsavam) is a 1988 Indian Malayalam-language tragedy drama film directed by Bharath Gopi and written by John Paul. The film is about how innocence cannot be preserved forever and how maturity means accepting imperfections within oneself, in others, and in society while forging one’s own path by submitting to that reality. The earlier one learns to do this, the better. The film stars Mohanlal, Parvathy Jayaram, Devan and Sukumaran in the lead roles. The film has musical score composed by G. Devarajan.

== Plot ==
Once upon a time in a village, the grand festival of the family temple marked the beginning of our tale. In a grand Royal family, Poovulla Kovilakom, the once prestigious household is silently on the brim of imminent ruin. Ravi, known as Ettan Thampuran, took charge, but his mismanagement led to mounting debts. His brother, Aniyan Thampuran, gentle and pure-hearted, stayed away from family matters. Despite being seen as a do-gooder, he held no respect or power due to his perceived inefficacy. Ettan Thampuran's extramarital affair, his domineering wife, 'Ettathi,' and a conniving caretaker, Pangunni Nair, added to the family's woes.

Amidst this, Aniyan Thampuran's life unfolds with parallel plots. His lower-caste friend, Madhavan Kutty, elopes with Indira, creating a stir in the village. His other friend, Rajan, self-exiles out of desperation. Aniyan's own marriage to Karthika from the Noble Nair family reveals the stark differences in their family conditions. Aniyan's simplicity and Karthika's unwavering support bring a new dynamic to their relationship. Meanwhile, a college professor, Balan Master, befriends Aniyan Thampuran, offering guidance on expressing opinions courageously.

As Aniyan Thampuran starts asserting himself, questioning land sales and resisting undue influence, the family faces mounting challenges. Tragedy strikes when Ettan Thampuran dies from a snakebite, leaving Aniyan with a house drowning in debts. Despite his newfound assertiveness, Aniyan grapples with the weight of responsibilities. Eventually, overwhelmed by despair, he takes his own life.

The story ends on a poignant note, as Karthika, Aniyan Thampuran's widow, declines a proposal from Balan Master. She chooses instead to cherish the memories of her late husband, rejecting a possible second chance at a life of happiness.

== Cast ==
- Mohanlal as Unni, Aniyan Thampuran
- Parvathy Jayaram as Karthika, Aniyan's wife
- Devan as Balan Master
- Sukumaran as Ravi, Ettan Thampuran
- Kaviyoor Ponnamma as Kalyaniyamma, housekeeper
- Jayaram as Rajan Poduval, Aniyan's friend and Indira's brother
- Sankaradi as Pangunni Nair, caretaker
- Sumithra as Ettathi, Ettan's wife
- Urmilla as Pangunni's widowed daughter-in-law
- Sukumari as Bhageerathi, Pangunni's wife
- Philomina as Muthassi
- Mala Aravindan as Pisharody, postman
- Sabitha Anand as Indira, Madhavan Kutty's wife
- Jagathy Sreekumar as Madhavan Kutty, Aniyan's friend
- Kuthiravattam Pappu as Pushpangadan, mahout
- Oduvil Unnikrishnan as Paramu Nair (Cameo)
- Kollam G. K. Pillai (Cameo role)
- Vishnu Ravee as Junior Aniyan Thampuran
- Chandran Nair as Karthika's father
- Suma Jayaram as Malathi, Karthika's sister

== Reception ==
Mohanlal won the Kerala State Film Award – Special Jury Award for his performance in the film.
