= Padamudra (film) =

- Promotional poster designed by Gayathri Ashokan
- Directed by: R. Sukumaran
- Written by: R. Sukumaran
- Produced by: Augustine Elanjipilli
- Starring: Mohanlal; Seema; Nedumudi Venu; Mala Aravindan; Sithara; Urvashi; Jagadish; Kalasala Babu
- Cinematography: Saloo George
- Edited by: A. Ramesan
- Music by: Vidyadharan; Johnson (Score)
- Production company: Noble Pictures
- Distributed by: Tharangini Release
- Release date: 24 June 1988
- Running time: 125 minutes
- Country: India
- Language: Malayalam

Padamudra (transl. Footprint) is a 1988 Indian Malayalam-language drama film written and directed by R. Sukumaran(in his directorial debut). It stars Mohanlal in the dual roles of Soap Kuttappan and Maathu Pandaaram, along with Seema and Nedumudi Venu. The film features original songs composed by Vidyadharan and a background score by Johnson. The film won Mohanlal the Kerala Film Critics Association Award for Best Actor, Filmfare Award for Best Malayalam Actor and a Kerala State Film Special Jury Award.

== Plot ==
Pandaram, a traveling vendor, has an illicit relationship with Gojamma, a simple village woman. Their son, Kuttappan, is haunted by childhood memories of his father and tries to find out the truth.

== Cast ==
- Mohanlal in a dual roles as:
  - Soap Kuttappan
  - Maathu Pandaaram
- Seema
- Nedumudi Venu
- Sithara
- Urvashi
- Rohini as Aswothi
- Shyama
- Mala Aravindan
- Jagadish
- Adoor Bhavani
- Kalasala Babu
- Thikkurissy Sukumaran Nair
- Mstr. Sreekumar

== Soundtrack ==
All music is composed by Vidyadharan.

Track listing
No.	Title	Lyrics	Artist(s)	Length
1.	"Aarumilla Agathiyenikkoru"		Mohanlal
2.	"Ambalamillathe Aaltharayil"	Hari Kudappanakkunnu	K. J. Yesudas, Choir
3.	"Vaadyopakaranangal"
4.	"Karumbiyaam Ammayude"	Edaman Thankappan	K. S. Chithra
5.	"Onpathu Maasam"	Edaman Thankappan	Mohanlal

== Reception ==
Neelima Menon of The News Minute wrote, "The film oscillates between the past and the present, with Mohanlal catching the variations of the two character's with impeccable nuance, be it the anger, self-loathing and vulnerability simmering in the son or the lasciviousness and cockiness of the father."

== Accolades ==
Mohanlal won Kerala Film Critics Association Award for Best Actor, Filmfare Award for Best Malayalam Actor and a Kerala State Film Award (Special Jury Award).
