= St. George's Church, Kalady =

Christian church in Kalady, India

St. George Church, Kalady is a Christian church situated on the banks of the river Periyar in the Ernakulam district of Kerala, India. The church was established on 20 March 1960. The new church in Kalady, built by the parishioners, was consecrated on 4 March 1984 under the leadership of Fr. Antony Elavumkudy. The present vicar is Fr. Joseph Thamaravely (2014-).

The Kalady Church belongs to the Ernakulam-Angamaly Archdiocese of the Syro-Malabar Church and has more than 3000 parishioners. Twenty priests and about seventy nuns work here, as well as in different missions around the world. The Parish Council is the governing body.

Prior to 1960, the Christian community of Kalady frequented the ancient churches of Kanjoor and Angamaly. The metropolitan headquarters of the Saint Thomas Christians were in Angamaly, where Mar Abraham of Angamaly lived in the Ramban Hormizd Cathedral residence until his death in 1597.

The St. Thomas Syro-Malabar Church is an important Christian pilgrimage site, located in Malayattoor, approximately 10 km from Kalady.
