= Raveendran filmography =

Raveendran began his career as a playback singer through the song "Parvanarajanithan" from a Malayalam film, Velliyazhcha. Later he associated with many composers and meanwhile served as a dubbing artist for films. He dubbed for actor Shankar in Aranjaanam directed by P. Venu. Primarily wished to become a playback singer, his destiny was changed by K. J. Yesudas, who realised his ability to create tunes which eventually led to his first movie Choola in 1979.

== Film songs ==
Raveendran's film music composing career starts from the J. Sasikumar directed 1979 movie Choola, from which the song "Taarake mizhiyithalil kanneerumayi", rendered by his music college friend K. J. Yesudas, became a hit. In a career spanning 26 years, until his death in 2005, he composed music for about 148 movies (including unreleased movies) and about 30 studio albums.

=== 1970s ===
Year	Film	Lyrics	Singer(s)	Raagams used	Other note(s)
1979	Choola	Poovachal Khader, Sathyan Anthikad	K. J. Yesudas, S. Janaki, Lathika, Jency Anthony	Mohanam	Debut as a music director

=== 1980s ===
Year	Film	Lyrics	Singer(s)	Raagams used	Other note(s)
1980	Oru Varsham Oru Maasam	Poovachal Khader	K. J. Yesudas, C. O. Anto, S. Janaki	Mohanam	
1981	Dhruvasangamam	Sathyan Anthikkad	K. J. Yesudas, Lathika	Mohanam, Amritavarshini	
1981	Swarnapakshikal	Mullanezhi	K. J. Yesudas, P. Jayachandran, S. Janaki	Kalyani, Kaanada	
1981	Thaarattu	Madhu Alappuzha, Sasikala Menon, Bharanikkavu Sivakumar	K. J. Yesudas, P. Susheela, S. Janaki	Revathi, Hamsadhwani	
1981	Thenum Vayambum	Bichu Thirumala	K. J. Yesudas, S. Janaki, Unnimenon, Jency Anthony	Shivaranjani, Madhyamavathi	
1982	Chiriyo Chiri	Bichu Thirumala	K. J. Yesudas, P. Jayachandran, S. Janaki	Shivaranjani	
1982	Mazhanilavu	Poovachal Khader, Chunakkara Ramankutty	K. J. Yesudas, K. P. Brahmanandan, S. Janaki, Latha, Kousalya	Hamsadhwani, Jog	
1982	Thaalam Thettiya Thaarattu	RK Damodaran	K. J. Yesudas, Vani Jayaram		
1982	Vidhichathum Kothichathum (Kasthuri)	Poovachal Khader	K. J. Yesudas, Lathika, Jency Anthony		
1983	Aadhyathe Anuragam	Madhu Alappuzha, Devadas	K. J. Yesudas, P. Jayachandran, S. Janaki, Sujatha	Valaji	
1983	Aattakalasham	Poovachal Khader	K. J. Yesudas, S. Janaki, Vani Jayaram	Madhyamavathi, Jog	
1983	Belt Mathai	Poovachal Khader	K. J. Yesudas, P. Jayachandran, Unni Menon, K. P. Brahmanandan	Shuddha Dhanyasi	
1983	Changatham	Puthiyankam Murali	K. J. Yesudas, S. Janaki	Hamsanadam	
1983	Coolie	Bichu Thirumala, Chunakkara Ramankutty, G. Indran	M. G. Sreekumar, KG Markose		
1983	Kinginikkombu	Mullanezhi	K. J. Yesudas, S. Janaki	Gourimanohari	
1983	Kinnaram	Sathyan Anthikad	K. J. Yesudas, Vani Jayaram	Mayamalavagowla	
1983	Prashnam Gurutharam	Bichu Thirumala	K. J. Yesudas, P. Jayachandran, Vani Jayaram	Shanmukhapriya, Pantuvarali, Japaniya	
1983	Vaashi	Mankombu Gopalakrishnan	P. Jayachandran, S. P. Sailaja, Ashokan		
1984	Aasamsakalode	N Ramesan	K. J. Yesudas		
1984	Aduthaduthu	Sathyan Anthikad	K. J. Yesudas, Kamukara, K. S. Chithra	Hamsanadam, Jog, Mohanam	
1984	Enganeyundaasane	Balu Kiriyath	K. J. Yesudas, P. Jayachandran, S. Janaki	Shuddha Saveri	
1984	Ente Nandinikuttikku	O. N. V. Kurup	K. J. Yesudas, Vani Jayaram, Sujatha	Mohanam, Vasanthi	
1984	Idavelakku Sesham	Poovachal Khader	K. J. Yesudas, Vani Jayaram	Amrithavarshini	
1984	Ithiripoove Chuvannapoove	O. N. V. Kurup, Kavalam Narayana Panicker	K. J. Yesudas, S. Janaki	Naatta, Kaanada	
1984	Kaliyil Alppam Kaaryam	Sathyan Anthikad	K. J. Yesudas, K. S. Chithra, Raveendran	Mohanam, Hamsadhwani	
1984	Mainakam	Bichu Thirumala	Markose, K. S. Chithra, Ambili		
1984	Manasse Ninakku Mangalam	Poovachal Khader	K. J. Yesudas, S. Janaki	Hindolam, Pantuvarali, Revathi	
1984	Sapatham	Mankombu Gopalakrishnan, Devadas	K. J. Yesudas, S. Janaki, Brahmanandan, Sujatha		
1984	Thacholi Thankappan	P. Bhaskaran	K. J. Yesudas, S. Janaki	Kalyani	
1984	Veruthe Oru Pinakkam	Sathyan Anthikkad	K. J. Yesudas	Shuddha Saveri, Revathi	
1985	Kayyum Thalayum Purathidaruthu	Mullanezhi, Poovachal Khader	K. J. Yesudas, S. Janaki, K. S. Chithra	Naatta, Mohanam	
1985	Neelakadambu	K. Jayakumar	K. J. Yesudas, K. S. Chithra	Shuddha Saveri, Revathi, Madhyamavathi, Desh	
1985	Omanikkan Ormavakkan	Poovachal Khader	K. J. Yesudas, Vani Jayaram, Lathika	Reethi Gowla	
1985	Orikkal Oridathu	Poovachal Khader	K. J. Yesudas, Mrs Ramola, Vani Jayaram, Lathika	Madhyamavathi	
1985	Puzhayozhukum Vazhi	Rappal Sukumaran, Poovachal Khader	K. J. Yesudas, Vani Jayaram, Kausalya, Anitha	Hamsadhwani	
1985	Telephonil Thodaruthu	Poovachal Khader	K. J. Yesudas, Renuka Girijan	Naatta	
1985	Thammil Thammil	Poovachal Khader	K. J. Yesudas, Lathika	Madhyamavathi, Arabhi	
1985	Vilichu Vilikettu	Sreekumaran Thampi	K. J. Yesudas	Maand, Pantuvarali	
1986	Annoruravil	Mankombu Gopalakrishnan	K. J. Yesudas, Krishnachandran, Vani Jayaram, K. S. Chithra		
1986	Desadanakkili Karayarilla	O. N. V. Kurup	K. J. Yesudas, K. S. Chithra	Shuddha Saveri, Mohanam	
1986	Geetham	Bichu Thirumala	K. J. Yesudas, K. S. Chithra	Abheri, Hamsadhwani	
1986	Pournamirathriyil	Poovachal Khader, Peramangalam Viswanathan	K. J. Yesudas, Balagopalan Thampi, P. Madhuri, Dr. Dilip, Ambili	Madhyamavathi	
1986	Prathyekam Shradhikkuka	Balu Kiriyath	K. J. Yesudas, K. S. Chithra		
1986	Sukhamo Devi	O. N. V. Kurup	K. J. Yesudas, K. S. Chithra	Revathi, Bhairavi	
1986	Yuvajanotsavam	Sreekumaran Thampi	K. J. Yesudas, S. Janaki, S. P. Sailaja, Krishnachandran, Satheesh Babu	Sri Ragam, Sindhu Bhairavi, Jayanthasri	
1987	Kottum Kuravayum	Madhu Alappuzha	Unni Menon, K. S. Chithra		
1987	Oru Maymasa Pulariyil	P. Bhaskaran	K. J. Yesudas, K. S. Chithra, Ajithan, Baiju	Jog, Malayamarutham	
1987	Vaiki Odunna Vandi	Ezhacheri Ramachandran	K. J. Yesudas, P. Jayachandran, S. P. Sailaja	Naatta, Mohanakalyani	
1988	Adholokam	Balu Kiriyath	K. S. Chithra, R. Usha		
1988	David David Mr. David	Bichu Thirumala	K. J. Yesudas, K. S. Chithra	Shuddha Saveri, Malayamarutham	
1988	Marikkunnilla Njan	Ezhacheri Ramachandran	K. P. Brahmanandan, G. Venugopal, R. Usha	Hindolam	
1988	Onnum Onnum Pathinonnu	Devadas	P. Jayachandran, P. Susheela, Lathika, Alice, Sunanda	Madhyamavati	
1989	Nagarangalil Chennu Raparkam	Bichu Thirumala	K. J. Yesudas, Unni Menon, K. S. Chithra	Mohanam	

=== 1990s ===
Year	Film	Lyrics	Singer(s)	Raagams used	Other note(s)
1990	Aye Auto	Bichu Thirumala	P. Jayachandran, M. G. Sreekumar, Mohanlal, Sujatha	Madhyamavathi, Vasantham	
1990	Brahmarakshassu	Girish Puthenchery	K. J. Yesudas, K. S. Chitra		
1990	His Highness Abdullah	Kaithapram, Anwar Maqsood	K. J. Yesudas, K. S. Chitra, M. G. Sreekumar, Raveendran Sujith (Sharreth)	Shanmukhapriya, Kaanada, Jog, Gourimanohari	M. G. Sreekumar won National Film Award for Best Male Playback Singer for Naadaroopini
1990	Kuttettan	Kaithapram	K. J. Yesudas, K. S. Chitra		
1990	Lal Salam	O. N. V. Kurup	K. J. Yesudas, M. G. Sreekumar, Raveendran, Sujatha	Madhyamavathi, Rugmambari	
1990	Mindapoochakku Kalyanam	Poovachal Khader	K. J. Yesudas, K. S. Chitra	Pantuvarali, Mohanam	
1990	Paadatha Veenayum Paadum	Poovachal Khader	K. J. Yesudas	Abheri	
1990	Vasavadatha	Bichu Thirumala	K. J. Yesudas, S. Janaki, K. S. Chitra	Amruthavarshini	
1991	Aakasha Kottayile Sultan	ONV Kurup	M. G. Sreekumar, K. S. Chitra	Abheri, Pantuvarali	
1991	Abhimanyu	Kaithapram	M. G. Sreekumar, K. S. Chitra	Madhyamavathi, Reethi Gowla, Natabhairavi	
1991	Amaram	Kaithapram	K. J. Yesudas, K. S. Chitra, Lathika	Darbari Kanada, Hameer Kalyani	
1991	Bharatham	Kaithapram	Dr. M. Balamuralikrishna, K. J. Yesudas, Raveendran, M. G. Sreekumar, Kallara Gopan, K. S. Chitra, Sangeetha		Raveendran won Special Jury Award at National Film Awards.; K. J. Yesudas won National Film Award for Best Male Playback Singer for Ramakatha...; Raveendran won Kerala State Film Award for Best Music Director.
1991	Bhoomika	P. K. Gopi	K. J. Yesudas, K. S. Chitra, Krishnachandran, C. O. Anto	Abheri	
1991	Dhanam	Kaithapram	K. J. Yesudas, K. S. Chitra	Shanmukhapriya, Yamuna Kalyani, Shivaranjani	
1991	Eagle	R. K. Damodaran	K. J. Yesudas, K. S. Chitra, Sindhu Premkumar	Jayanthasri	
1991	Gaanamela	Sasi Chittanjoor, Kaithapram	K. J. Yesudas, K. S. Chitra, Sindhu Premkumar	Mohanam, Kanakangi	
1991	Ghanta Kavyam	Sreekumaran Thampi	P. Jayachandran		
1991	Kadinjool Kalyanam	Bichu Thirumala	K. J. Yesudas, M. G. Sreekumar, Mini	Abhogi	
1991	Kizhakkunarum Pakshi	K. Jayakumar	K. J. Yesudas, K. S. Chitra, Sujatha, Minmini	Lavangi, Charukesi, Shuddha Dhanyasi	
1991	Mahassar	Poovachal Khader	K. J. Yesudas, K. S. Chitra	Shuddha Dhanyasi	
1991	Miss Stella	Poovachal Khader	K. S. Chitra	Shuddha Dhanyasi	
1991	Uncle Bun	Pazhavila Ramesan, S. Ramesan Nair	K. J. Yesudas	Darbari Kanada	
1992	Vishnu Lokam	Kaithapram	P. Jayachandran, M. G. Sreekumar, Malaysia Vasudevan, Mohanlal, Sujatha	Desh, Sindhu Bhairavi, Abheri	
1992	Aham	Kavalam Narayana Panicker, Konniyoor Bhas	K. J. Yesudas	Mohanam, Salaga Bhairavi	
1992	Champakkulam Thachan	Bichu Thirumala	K. J. Yesudas, M. G. Sreekumar, K. S. Chitra, Lathika	Abheri	
1992	Ente Tuition Teacher	Poovachal Khader	K. J. Yesudas, K. S. Chitra		
1992	Kallanum Policeum	Sreekumaran Thampi	M. G. Sreekumar, K. S. Chitra		
1992	Kamaladalam	Kaithapram	K. J. Yesudas, M. G. Sreekumar, Kanhangad Ramachandran, K. S. Chitra, Latha	Bilahari, Kaanada, Kambhoji, Maand	
1992	Rajashilpi	O. N. V. Kurup	K. J. Yesudas, P. Jayachandran, K. S. Chitra	Mohanam, Shuddha Saveri, Madhyamavathi	
1992	Soorya Gayathri	O. N. V. Kurup	K. J. Yesudas, Krishnachandran, K. S. Chitra	Abhogi, Hamsanadam	
1993	Aayirappara	Kavalam Narayana Panicker	K. J. Yesudas, Arundhathi	Charukesi	
1993	Malare Kurinji Malare				Tamil film
1993	Butterflies	Bichu Thirumala	S. P. Balasubrahmanyam, M. G. Sreekumar, Unnimenon, K. S. Chitra, Sujatha, Raveendran, Mohanlal, Pradeep	Shivaranjani	
1993	Customs Dairy	Chunakkara Ramankutty	K. J. Yesudas, G. Venugopal, R. Usha	Sahana	
1993	Kalippattam	Bichu Thirumala, Konniyoor Bhas	K. J. Yesudas, M. G. Sreekumar, Mohanlal, K. S. Chitra	Shuddha Dhanyasi, Harikambhoji	
1993	Koushalam	Kaithapram	K. J. Yesudas, K. S. Chitra, Sujatha	Shuddha Saveri	
1993	Paadaliputhram	Bichu Thirumala			
1993	Vengalam	P. Bhaskaran	K. J. Yesudas, Biju Narayanan, K. S. Chitra	Kaanada, Valaji, Abheri	
1994	Ezhuthachan	Kaithapram	K. J. Yesudas, K. S. Chitra, Pradeep Somasundaram	Charukesi, Madhyamavathi, Kalyani	
1994	Geetham Sangeetham	Kaithapram	K. J. Yesudas, K. S. Chitra, P. Madhuri, Vani Jairam	Charukesi, Sindhu Bhairavi, Hindolam, Kāpi	
1994	Nikkahu	Bichu Thirumala	K. J. Yesudas, K. S. Chitra, M. G. Sreekumar		
1994	Paavam IA Ivachan	Bichu Thirumala	K. J. Yesudas, K. S. Chitra	Shivaranjani	
1994	Pradhakshinam	P. Bhaskaran, Balachandran Chullikkad	K. J. Yesudas, K. S. Chitra, Sindhu	Shuddha Dhanyasi	
1994	Rajasabha [Unreleased]	P. K. Gopi	M. G. Sreekumar, G. Venugopal, Unni Menon, Kanhangad Ramachandran, K. S. Chitra, Sujatha	Pahadi	
1994	Share Market [Unreleased]	Yusuf Ali Kecheri	Kanhangad Ramachandran, K. S. Chitra, Shobha, Shahanaz	Mohanam, Vrindavani sarang	
1994	Socrates [Unreleased]	Mankombu Gopalakrishnan	K. J. Yesudas, Mohanlal, K. S. Chitra, Ranjini Menon	Mohanam	
1994	Tharavaadu (Chathurvarnyam) [released]	Bichu Thirumala	K. J. Yesudas, K. S. Chitra, Krishnachandran	Sri Ragam	
1994	Vishnu	Bichu Thirumala	K. J. Yesudas, K. S. Chitra	Kalyani, Kaanada, Bhaathiyaar	
1995	Chaithanyam	O. N. V. Kurup	K. J. Yesudas, Jayan Adiyattu, Biju Narayanan, Daleema	Shanmukhapriya, Shuddha Saveri, Saramati	
1995	Kakkakkum Poochakkum Kalyanam	Kaithapram	K. J. Yesudas, K. S. Chitra, Arundhathi, Ambili, Biju Narayanan	Shuddha Saveri	
1995	Mazhayethum Munpe	Kaithapram, Bichu Thirumala	K. J. Yesudas, K. S. Chitra	Shuddha Dhanyasi, Darbari Kanada	
1995	Oru Abhibhashakante Case Diary	Shibu Chakravarthy	K. J. Yesudas, M. G. Sreekumar, P. Susheela, Sujatha	Jayanthasri, Madhyamavathi	
1995	The President	Gireesh Puthenchery	Srinivas, K. S. Chitra, M. G. Sreekumar, Chitu, Fabi		
1996	19 April	S. Ramesan Nair	K. J. Yesudas, S. Janaki, Raveendran, Roshni Mohan	Jog, Sri Ragam	
1996	Malayala Maasam Chingam Onnu	Gireesh Puthenchery	K. J. Yesudas, Krishnachandran, K. G. Markose, Biju Narayanan	Sindhu Bhairavi, Kharaharapriya	
1997	Aaram Thamburan	Gireesh Puthenchery	K. J. Yesudas, M. G. Sreekumar, K. S. Chitra, Sujatha Mohan	Sindhu Bhairavi, Mohanam, Madhyamavathi, Darbar, Hindolam	
1997	Aattuvela	Gireesh Puthenchery	Biju Narayanan, Daleema		
1997	Kalyanapittennu	S. Ramesan Nair	K. J. Yesudas, K. S. Chitra, Daleema	Natabhairavi, Malayamarutham	
1997	Kannur	Kaithapram	K. J. Yesudas, K. S. Chitra	Sindhu Bhairavi, Jog	
1997	Mannadiyar Penninu Chenkotta Chekkan	P. K. Gopi	Mano		
1997	Oru Mutham Mani Mutham	O. N. V. Kurup	K. J. Yesudas, M. G. Sreekumar	Amrithavarshini	
1997	Poomara Thanalil	S. Ramesan Nair	K. J. Yesudas, S. P. Balasubrahmanyam, K. S. Chitra, Sujatha Mohan, Sindhu, Sunitha, Biju	Naatta, Hindolam, Shuddha Dhanyasi	
1997	Saaphalyam	O. N. V. Kurup	K. J. Yesudas, Ravishankar, K. S. Chitra, Sujatha Mohan	Chandra Kouns	
1997	Uttaradesam	P. K. Ravindran	Biju Narayanan, Srinivas, K. S. Chitra	Shuddha Dhanyasi, Charukesi, Kapi	
1998	Ayal Kadhayezhuthukayaanu	Kaithapram	K. J. Yesudas, Mano, K. S. Chitra, Sujatha Mohan	Mohanam, Yamuna Kalyani, Abheri	
1998	Arayannangalude Veedu	Gireesh Puthenchery	K. J. Yesudas, P. Jayachandran, Mano, K. S. Chitra	Vrindavani sarang, Darbari Kanada	
1998	Ilamura Thamburan	O. N. V. Kurup	K. J. Yesudas, Sujatha Mohan		
1998	Kanmadam	Gireesh Puthenchery	K. J. Ye*sudas, M.G. Sreekumar,, Radhika Thilak	Shuddha Saveri, Kharaharapriya	
1998	Panchaloham	Gireesh Puthenchery	K. J. Yesudas, K. S. Chitra	Chakravakam	
1999	English Medium	Gireesh Puthenchery	K. J. Yesudas, M. G. Sreekumar, Biju Narayanan, Pattanakkad Purushothaman, Daleema	Natabhairavi	
1999	Pallavur Devanarayanan	Gireesh Puthenchery	K. J. Yesudas, K. S. Chitra, M. G. Sreekumar, Mammootty	Madhyamavathi	
1999	Thachiledathu Chundan	Bichu Thirumala	K. J. Yesudas, K. S. Chitra	Desh, Abheri	

=== 2000s ===
Year	Film	Lyrics	Singer(s)	Raagams used	Other note(s)
2000	Manayoorile Manikyam	Kaithapram	K. J. Yesudas		
2000	Mazha	Yusuf Ali Kecheri, O. V. Usha	K. J. Yesudas, K. S. Chitra, Arundhathi, Neyyattinkara Vasudevan, Asha G. Menon	Mohanam, Amrithavarshini, Charukesi, Jonpuri, Jog	
2001
2001	Saivar Thirumeni	Gireesh Puthenchery	K. J. Yesudas, K. S. Chitra, Manoj K. Jayan, Soumya	Madhyamavathi, Sumaneesha, Ranjani	
2001	Soothradharan	S. Ramesan Nair	K. J. Yesudas, S. P. Balasubrahmanyam, M. G. Sreekumar, Sujatha Mohan, Vishwanathan, Gayathri	Shuddha Dhanyasi, Desh, Arabhi	
2002	Chakkarakkudam	Gireesh Puthenchery	M. G. Sreekumar, Sujatha Mohan, Raveendran	Shuddha Saveri, Madhyamavathi, Keeravani	
2002	Ente Hridayathinte Udama	O. N. V. Kurup	K. J. Yesudas, K. S. Chitra, P. Jayachandran, G. Venugopal, Naveen Madhav, Sujatha Mohan	Kanakangi	
2002	Krishna Paksha Kilikal	Bharanikkavu Sivakumar	K. J. Yesudas, P. Jayachandran	Madhyamavathi	
2002	Nandanam	Gireesh Puthenchery	K. J. Yesudas,P. JayachandranK. S. Chitra, M. G. Sreekumar, Sujatha Mohan,Radhika Thilak	Shuddha Dhanyasi, Madhyamavathi, Naatta, Mohanam, Yamuna Kalyani	Raveendran won Kerala State Film Award for Best Music Director
2002	Pakalppooram	S. Ramesan Nair	P. Jayachandran, K. S. Chitra, Raveendran, Vidhu Prathap, Sujatha Mohan		
2003
2003	Ammakilikkoodu	Kaithapram	K. J. Yesudas, P. Jayachandran, P. Susheela, M. G. Sreekumar, Sujatha Mohan, Radhika Thilak, Vijay Yesudas	Pahadi, Vrindavani sarang, Darbari Kanada	
2003	Chakram	Gireesh Puthenchery	K. J. Yesudas, P. Jayachandran, Santhosh Keshav, Biju Narayanan, K. S. Chitra	Mohanam	
2003	Cheri	Gireesh Puthenchery	Biju Narayanan		
2003	Maraatha Naadu	Kaithapram			
2003	Illathe Kilikkoodu	Yusuf Ali Kecheri	K. J. Yesudas, K. S. Chitra	Charukesi	
2003	Mizhi Randilum	Vayalar Sarath Chandra Varma	K. J. Yesudas, P. Jayachandran, K. S. Chitra Sreenivas,Sujatha Mohan	Shuddha Saveri, Sumaneesha Ranjani, Kalyani, Kambhoji	
2003	Njan Salperu Ramankutty	B. R. Prasad	M. G. Sreekumar, Biju Narayanan, Madhu Balakrishnan, Radhika Thilak, Jyotsna	Jog, Arabhi, Kaanada	
2004	Agninakshathram	Shibu Chakravarthy	K. J. Yesudas, Biju Narayanan, K. S. Chitra, Radhika Thilak	Shivaranjani	
2004	Greetings	Gireesh Puthenchery	M. G. Sreekumar, Vidhu Prathap, Jyotsna, Priya Ghosh, Asha G. Menon, Prathapachandran, Gayathri, Lali Anil, Ranjini Jose		
2005	Cholliyattam	Gireesh Puthenchery	K. J. Yesudas, M. G. Sreekumar, K. S. Chitra, Vijay Yesudas, Biju Narayanan, Asha G. Menon	Hindolam, Shuddha Dhanyasi	
2006	Kalabham	S. Ramesan Nair	K. J. Yesudas, Madhu Balakrishnan, Ranjani Hari, Sharreth, Krishnakumar		
2006	Vadakkumnadhan	Gireesh Puthenchery, Jayadeva (for the song Rajani Janithaguru)	K. J. Yesudas, M. G. Sreekumar, K. S. Chitra, Biju Narayanan, Sankaran Namboothiri, Manjari, Sindhu Premkumar, Govind Vivek	Jog, Hamsadhwani, Kapi, Madhyamavathi, Pushpalathika, Reethi Gowla, Revathi	Last movie work of Raveendran master

=== Tamil films ===
- Hemavin Kadhalargal (1985)
- Kanmaniye Pesu (1985)
- Rasigan Oru Rasigai (1986)
- Lakshmi Vandhachu (1986)
- Dharma Devathai (1986)
- Thaaye Nee Thunai (1987)
- Malare Kurinji Malare (1993)

=== Uncategorised ===
Film	Lyrics	Singer(s)	Raagams used	Other note(s)
Aayilyam Naalil	Kaithapram	K. S. Chitra, yesudas	Kapi, Shubhapantuvarali	

== Studio albums ==
=== 1980s ===
Year	Album	Lyrics	Singer(s)	Raagams used	Album Label	Other note(s)
1983	Ulsava Gaanangal Vol 1 / Festival Songs Vol 1	Sreekumaran Thampi	K. J. Yesudas, Janaki Devi	Madhyamavathi, Mohanam, Shuddha Saveri, Shuddha Dhanyasi, Charukesi, Hamsadhvani, Revathi	Tharangini Music	
1984	Vasantha Geethangal	Bichu Thirumala	K. J. Yesudas, K. S. Chitra	Sri Ragam, Abhogi, Karnataka Khamas, Mohanam, Kalyanavasantam, Pantuvarali, Dharmavati	Tharangini Music	
1985	Ulsava Gaanangal Vol 3 / Festival Songs Vol 3	Sreekumaran Thampi	K. J. Yesudas, K. S. Chitra	Shuddha Saveri, Charukesi, Revathi, Shivaranjani, Shubhapantuvarali, Chakravakam, Kalyani, Vasanthi, Srothaswini	Tharangini Music	

== Reused tunes ==
The following films had tunes reused from previous Raveendran soundtracks:

- His Highness Abdullah (1990) from Oru May Maasa Pulariyil (1987) (1 song "Iru Hridayangalil" tune used in "Pramadavanam" which has high notes compared to former, and both composed in Jog)
- Oru Rasigan Oru Rasigai from Chiriyo Chiri ("Ezhisai Geethame" was a Tamil version of "Ezhu Swarangalum")
- Oru Rasigan Oru Rasigai from Thenum Vayabhum ("Paadi Azhaithen" was a Tamil version of "Thenum Vayambhum Raavil")

== As a playback singer ==
Year	Song	Film	Lyrics	Co-singer(s)	Other Note(s)
1969	"Parvana Rajani"	Velliyazhcha	P. Bhaskaran	S Janaki	Music Composed by M. S. Baburaj
1970	"Sindabad"	Cross Belt	Sreekumaran Thampi		Music Composed by M. S. Baburaj
1984	"Disco Disco..."	Kaliyil Alppam Kaaryam	Sathyan Anthikad	K. S. Chithra	
1990	"Devasabhathalam..."	His Highness Abdullah	Kaithapram	K. J. Yesudas, Sujith (Sharreth)	
1990	"Aaro porunnen koode..."	Lal Salam	O. N. V. Kurup	M. G. Sreekumar, Sujatha	
1991	"Manipravalam, sreevinayakam..."	Bharatham	Kaithapram	Dr. M. Balamuralikrishna, K. J. Yesudas	
1993	"Ponthidambu..."	Butterflies	Bichu Thirumala	Mohanlal, Pratheep	
1995	"Enjeevane..."	Kakkakkum Poochakkum Kalyanam	Kaithapram	Solo	
1996	"Arivinnum..."	19 April	S. Ramesan Nair	Roshni Mohan	
1998	"Mohamaay..."	Oru Maravathoor Kanavu	Gireesh Puthenchery	K. S. Chitra	Music Composed by Vidyasagar
2000	"Shruthi amma..."	Madhuranombarakattu	Gireesh Puthenchery	K. J. Yesudas, K. S. Chitra	Music Composed by Vidyasagar
2002	"Nadavazhiyum..."	Pakalppooram	S. Ramesan Nair	Solo	
2002	"Pananthudi..."	Chakkarakkudam	Girish Puthenchery	Solo	
