= Oothukkadu Venkata Kavi =

Indian Carnatic music composer

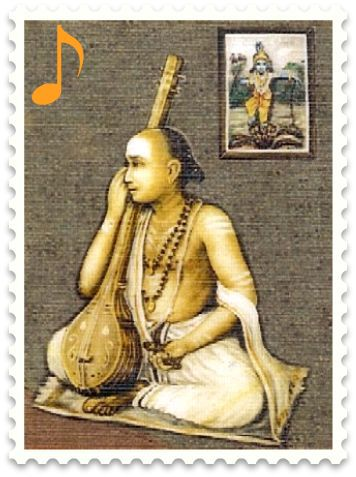
- Painting of Oothukkadu Venkatasubramaniya Iyer
- Born: Venkata Subramanian c. 1700; Mannargudi, Madurai Nayak Kingdom (now in Thiruvarur district, Tamil Nadu, India)
- Died: 1765 (aged 64–65)

Oothukkaadu Venkata Kavi (c. 1700-1765) or Oottukkaadu Venkata Subramanyar was one of the pioneering composers in Indian classical Carnatic music. He lived in South India in the present-day state of Tamil Nadu. Also known by the name Oothukkaadu Venkatasubramaniya Iyer, he composed hundreds of compositions in Sanskrit and Tamil of which over 500 are available. These were handed down from generation to generation by the descendants of the composer's brother's family.

Venkata Kavi's compositions reveal that he was a complete master of the science and art of music in all senses of the term – melody, rhythm, and lyrics. He was fluent in Sanskrit and Tamil. Renowned for his rare depth, scholarship and sublime appeal, he was proficient in a variety of musical forms such as the kriti, tillana and kaavadicchindu. He used taalas and themes that many other Carnatic composers had or have not. His compositions are a blend of a high degree of scholarship on a variety of subjects and inspired expression. During a lecture demonstration on the composer by Needamangalam Krishnamurthy Bhaagavatar in December 1955, The Music Academy Madras Experts' Committee noted that "Venkata Kavi's compositions filled a gap between Purandara Dasa (1470 -1564) and the Carnatic Music Trinity of Tyaagaraaja, Muthuswami Dikshitar and Shyama Shastri, who lived around 1760s-1840s."

While he has rightfully been acknowledged as one of the greatest composers on Krishna, Venkata Kavi composed hundreds of pieces on other deities too. Several pieces also reveal his humility, reverence for the great personalities before his times, and the high state of bliss that he probably experienced almost ceaselessly. His works scarcely contain autobiographical notes but show that he had reached great spiritual and philosophical heights. Deeper studies have dispelled myths about some of his compositions such as, for example, "Alaipaayude kannaa" (raaga: Kaanada) being autobiographical. They have also shown that this and numerous other pieces on Krishna in lilting Tamil were parts of an opera based on the Bhaagavatam. His works also reveal the proximity and deep devotion that he felt towards Krishna.

== Early life ==
Venkata Kavi, named Venkata Subramanian, was born in Mannaargudi town in Thiruvarur district in the Indian state of Tamil Nadu (about 200 miles from Chennai) as the eldest of five children to the Tamil Smaartha couple of Subbu Kutti Iyer and Venkammaa, according to the family records in the possession of the descendants of his brother Raamachandra Vaathoola's family. Though his ancestors had resided in various villages in South India around the temple town of Mannaargudi, Venkata Kavi moved to Oothukkadu village (referred to as "Dhenushvasapuram" in Sanskrit), near Kumbhakonam. One of his nephews, Kattu Krishna Iyer was a musician in the royal court of the Thanjavur Maraatha King Prataapa Simha Bhonsale in the later part of the 18th century. Venkata Kavi composed hundreds of songs in praise of the Kaalinga Nartana Krishna of Oottukkadu, also referred to as "Then Gokulam" (literally, "Southern Gokulam") and several other shrines over the course of his life.

According to family sources, Venkata Kavi was passionate about music but could not find a Guru of his choice in that area, which prompted his mother to suggest that he appeal to the God Krishnaa himself, in the Kaalinga Narthana Temple in Oothukkaadu. He is believed to have received initiation from the Lord himself, as asserted in one of his Tamil compositions, Guru paadaaravindam komalamu - in the raga Abhogi, he declares: "I have never studied the scriptures or yoga nor pretended to have done so. I received the fortune of knowledge in the benevolent glance of my guru."

== Musicianship ==
The greatest evidence of his musical pedigree is his compositions. There are several references to good musical approach, practices and even technical terms of ornamentation like saahatam and pratyaahatam. Venkata Kavi believed that music had to be blended with spirituality (bhakti) in order to shine. His philosophy, bhakti yoga sangeeta margame paramapavanam aagume ("Devotion though music is the sole path to salvation") is also resonated by Tyagaraja (1767-1847) sangeeta gnanamu bhakti vinaa sanmaargamu galade.

Consult this Wiki glossary for some of the Carnatic music terms.

=== Raagas vision ===
Venkata Kavi had a vast knowledge of music and musical nuances. He used a wide variety of raagas ranging from the well known such as Todi, Kalyani, Kharaharapriya, Sahana, through minor ones like Kannadagowla, Jayantashri, Maalavi, Umaabharanam and a few that are seldom used today such as Balahamsa and Rasamanjari. In some instances, his works are the first or only ones to be available in a given raaga such as Sri Shivanayike in Lalitagandharvam and Paadasevanam in Deeparam. His approach to even common raagas like Sahaana, Pharas, Naadanaamakriya, and Aarabhi are distinctive and refreshing.

His vision of the raaga and melody as a whole is considerable and can be seen in the number of different styles in which he composed various krtis in the same raaga. For instance, his krtis in Madhyamavathi – Shankari Sri Raajaraajeshwari, Sundara nandakumaaraa and Aadaadu ashangaadu vaa Kannaa - bring out different facets of this beautiful raga. He also employed attractive swaraaksharas – a technique where the lyrics match the solfa notes of the tunes. He has also incorporated raaga mudra (mentioning the names of raagas of the compositions) in several krtis. Examples: Shuddha Saveri, Navarasakannada.

=== Sophisticated rhythm ===
Venkata Kavi ventured into scarcely attempted talas like Khanda Dhruvam (17 units per cycle), Sankeerna Madhyamam (20 units per cycle) and Mishra Atam (18 units per cycle). He effortlessly employed complex eduppus (take-off or landing points of various sections of a composition) without affecting the flow of the music or the lyrics. He could change the gati (gait) with ease,. He was probably the only composer to have not only handled chaturashra (4/4) time-signatures but also tishram (3/4 or 6/4) as well as khandam (5/4 or 5/8) etc. in his compositions; for example: Neerada-sama (Jayantashree), Natavara-taruni (Kannadagowla), Vitasama-vara (Vasantaa), and Urugaada manam (Todi).

=== Lyrical variations ===
Sangatis are pre-composed variations in a composition and rendered in a disciplined manner (as opposed to variations born from free improvisation). Usually, variations are melodic in nature while the lyrics remain constant. Several of Venkata Kavi’s pieces have such sangatis but he also demonstrated a rarely seen concept of lyrical variations. For instance, in the pallavi of his Aabhogi kriti, Mahashaya hrdaya, he has composed three variations in the madhyamakaala passage as given below:

1. madhukara champaka vana vihaara manamohana Madhusoodana navabhooshana
2. madhukara champaka vana vihaara nava pallava padakara madana gambheera
3. madhukara champaka vana vihaara govardhana dhara bhujaga nartana charana

Similar examples can be seen in pieces like Aganita mahima (Gowla). In this composition, he has also used innovative structuring by inserting medium-fast passages between two slower cycles, investing the section with.

=== Emphatic finales ===
Venkata Kavi was a master of finishes. In several songs, his endings are in interesting rhythmic patterns. For example, Bhuvanamoha in Dhanyasi, where he has capped off the charanam with a pattern of 6 repeated 11 times, which is a wonderful way to get to half a beat landing (which is the commencing point of the pallavi) from the beat after 2 cycles of Adi tala. The words are superbly woven in lilting Sanskrit:

atinootana kusumaakara vrjamohana saraseeruha dalalochana mamamanasa patuchorasu- swarageetasu- muraleedhara suramodita bhavamochana

There are many other instances of similar endings in krtis such as Alavadennalo in Pharas (5th charanam) and Mummada vezhamugattu Vinayakan in Nattai.

== Multi-lingual felicity ==
Venkata Kavi had deep scholarship in Sanskrit and Tamil. His fluency in Sanskrit rivalled that of his command of Tamil, a commentary not only on his erudition but also a pointer to his immense vocabulary- words such as kalamba (arrow), charatha (wandering), shileemukha (bee) are just a few examples out of hundreds seen in his works, which are especially unique in Carnatic literature. He had the ability of use common words in uncommon contexts.

== Imagination ==
His poetic ability to create unique scenarios or give singular twists to even common stories is seen in hundreds of songs such as Taye yashoda in raga Todi, where the gopikas are complaining to Yashoda about her son Lord Krishna. This song has eight charanams (stanzas) and each one describes the pranks of Krishna very humorously. Not so well known is the reply by Krishna to every one of these charges in another piece, Illai illai in Mohanam, also with eight charanams. This quality sets him apart even in his general compositions such as Chindittavar nenjil iruppadu (Nattai).

== Compositions ==
- Complete Compositions of Oothukaadu in Tamil
- Complete Compositions of Oothukaadu in English

Venkata Kavi has composed on a wide range of themes. The most popular of his songs are on Lord Krishna but he has composed on a number of other deities as well, such as Vinayaka, Radha, Tyagaraja of Tiruvarur, Kamakshi, Rama, Kartikeya, Narasimha, Anjaneya, Ranganatha, Surya and other divine figures. He has also composed on great sages such as Shuka Brahma Rishi, Jayadeva, and Valmiki, on the greatness of Guru, and general philosophy and approach to God. His works contain references to Alvars, Nayanmars, Ramanuja, Tulasidas and many others revealing his knowledge of their works and contributions and his reverence towards them.

=== Forms employed ===
- Krtis of various types - Slow paced, medium fast, songs with samashti charanam, songs with jatis (rhythmic syllables), songs set with gati bhedam (gait/pulse) change, songs with Kalai change
- Tillanas
- Shlokas/Free verses
- Natangam - a form that has lyrics and rhythmic syllables with and without melody in various sections
- Javali
- Padam
- Thiruppugazh style composition (à la Arunagirinathar)

== Operas ==
As of 2007, no other composer in India has created as many musical operas as Venkata Kavi has.

The most well known is "Krishna Ganam" based on Bhagavatam, which narrates Krishna’s birth and colourful childhood, beginning from Devaki-Vasudeva’s wedding and Kamsa’s curse and ending with Krishna’s wedding with Rukmini. It is now well known that many popular songs on Krishna like Taye yashoda, Alaippayude kanna, Pal vadiyum mukham, Parvai onre podume and Pullai piravi tara venum are part of this opera.

Venkata Kavi also composed an entire group of pieces covering Krishna's wedding with Radha. His other operas include:

- Ramayanam
- Mahabharatam
- Daksha Yagam
- Prahlada Charitram
- Dhruva Charitram
- Pranavopadesham (which is a single folk style piece with 83 stanzas narrating Lord Subramanya's famous story of teaching his father, Shiva)
- Life sketch of Manickavachakar
- Life sketch of Kungili Nayanar
- Life sketch of Tirumangai Alvar

Several songs from Ramayanam and Mahabharatam are missing but even the few songs which have been found showcase "his skills in giving original treatment of known episodes" as dancer Dr Vyjayantimala Bali states.

The composer also penned abridged versions of Ramayana, Mahabharata and Bhagavatam.

== Group compositions ==
Venkata Kavi has composed krtis of similar structure that form sets (or groups). The most notable ones are his Kamakshi Navavaranam and Saptaratna compositions (especially the Anjaneya Saptaratna). He has also composed several shlokas such as Madhava panchakam, Nrsimha panchakam, Ranganatha Panchakam and so on.

=== Saptaratna krtis ===
His Saptaratnas (seven gems = seven songs) are dazzling creations, consisting of the main refrain (pallavi), a contrasting section (anupallavi) and a series of other sections (charanas) in medium tempo (madhyama kala) that can be rendered as swara and sahitya. These songs resemble the Pancharatna kritis of Tyagaraja, though Venkata Kavi is said to have lived much before Tyagaraja. The compositions are all in Adi tala, but the differences in melody, rhythm, and brilliant lyrical themes make each composition stand out. For instance, ‘Bhajanamruta’ in Nattai, pays tributes to great philosophers and spiritualists and cites numerous mythological and historical devotees of Vishnu (examples: Prahlada, Sanaka, Narada, Anjaneya, Guha, Sabari, Sugreeva) as well as Shiva (such as Nandi, Matanga, Vyagrapada, Manickavachagar and Sundarar) and Subramanya (such as Arunagirinathar). The saptaratnas are:

1. Bhajanamrta – Nattai
2. Aganita mahima – Gowla
3. Madhava hrdi khelini – Kalyani
4. Balasarasa murali – Keeravani
5. Jatadara – Todi
6. Alavadennalo – Paras
7. Sundara nandakumara – Madhyamavathi

Though Venkata Kavi has composed a few more songs in the same style, they are not part of his Saptaratna set since they were composed as parts of other operatic works of his such as Bhagavatam.

=== Anjaneya Saptaratna Kritis ===
The Anjaneya Saptaratna krtis, eulogize Hanuman and all seven pieces are in Sanskrit. These are:

1. Pavana Kumara - Vasantha
2. Veekshitoham - Kedaragowla
3. Anjanānandām Bōdhi Chandra - Todi
4. Shree Raghavadhootam - Surutti
5. Bhaktabhagadheya - Madhyamavathi
6. Satvaguna Virachitanga - Rasamanjari
7. Vahini Tata - Malayamarutam

Of these, the last two were not published which led to a wrong categorization in some quarters. However, these have been subsequently located in the possession of the Needamangalam Krishnamurthy Bhagavatar's (descendant of the poet's brother) family and disciples.

=== Kamakshi Navavaranam Kritis ===
Venkata Kavi also composed Navavarnams (nine avarnams) on the goddess Srividya to be sung during Dasara. Venkata kavi’s collection of Kamakshi Navavarana kritis on goddess Srividya is a masterpiece. Apart from the main nine songs for the nine nights, he has also composed Vinayaka stuti, Dhyana stuti and a Phala stuti. There are several similarities (and differences) between his Navavaranams and that of Muthuswami Dikshitar but both reveal the composers’ scholarship in the various aspects of Devi worship. These are:

1. Sri Ganeshwara – Shanmukhapriya – Adi – Vinayaka stuti
2. Vanchasi yadi kushalam – Kalyani – Adi – Dhyana stuti
3. Santatam aham seve – Deshakshi – Adi - (1st avaranam)
4. Bhajaswa sri tripura sundari – Nadanamakriya – Adi - (2nd avaranam)
5. Sarvajeeva dayakari – Shuddha Saveri – Mishra Chapu - (3rd avaranam)
6. Yoga yogeshwari – Anandabhairavi – Khanda Triputa (2 kalais) - (4th avaranam)
7. Neelalohita ramani – Balahamsa – Khanda Dhruvam (2 kalais) - (5th avaranam)
8. Sadanandamayi chinmayi – Hindolam – Sankeerna Matyam - (6th avaranam)
9. Sakala loka nayike – Arabhi – Adi - (7th avaranam)
10. Shankari Shri Rajarajeshwari – Madhyamavathi – Adi - (8th avaranam)
11. Natajana kalpavalli – Punnagavarali – Adi - (9th avaranam)
12. Sri haladharanujam praptum - Manirangu - Adi - Phala shruti

While the pieces showcase the composer's high caliber approach to melody, lyric, poetry and culture, they stand out for his masterly handling of intricate time measures of 9, 17 and 20 units per cycle in the 4th, 5th and 6th avarana kris respectively. This 8th avaranam has been set in alternate time-signatures within the same tala – chaturashram (4/4) and tishram (3/4).

=== Guru Krtis ===
Venkata Kavi composed at least 14-15 pieces extolling the greatness of his Guru, Krishna. A few of them suggest that he may also have had another human guru, at least for spiritual purposes. According to sources from that area, this guru was Bhaskara Raya, the acclaimed authority of Devi worship of his times. This is further augmented by the immense scholarship seen in Venkata Kavi's Kamakshi Navavarana krtis dealing with the intricate details of avarana pooja (Srividya worship).

== Dance compositions ==
Venkata Kavi's works have been automatic choices for hundreds of dancers for the scope they offer for visual interpretation, dance-specific jatis (syllables), dramatic appeal and creative content. Leading dancers of Bharatanatyam, Kuchippudi, Kathak and Odissi such as Dr Vyjayantimala Bali, Kamala Lakshman, Pt Birju Maharaj, Saswati Sen, Dr Padma Subrahmanyam, Dr Vempatti Chinna Satyam, Chitra Visweswaran (www.chitravisweswaran.com), Sanchita Bhattacharyaa and others have choreographed the poet's works over decades. However, there are innumerable compositions such as Nalladella enru sholladi (Shankarabharanam), Bhuvana moha (Dhanyasi), Neela malar (Vasanta), Ettanai kettalum (Bhairavi) and operas such as Pranavopadesham which are yet to be explored in the dance field.

== Works suited for other platforms ==
Venkata Kavi's works have been extensively cited in Harikatha (musical discourses) by leading exponents such as Shri Krishna Premi, Guru Haridass Giri, Shri Muraleedhara Swami and others. Needamangalam Krishnamurthy Bhagavatar (descendant of the poet's brother's family) was known for his gripping renditions of the composer's unique works like Kalinga Nartana Natangam and Krishna Padaadi Keshaanta varnanam.

Several of Venkata Kavi's compositions are part of the Bhagavata Bhajana Sampradaya (devotional music) repertoire as well. Shlokas (devotional poetry) such as Madhava Panchakam, Ranganatha Panchakam, Narasimha Panchakam and Shiva Tandava strotram are eminently suited for daily household worship as well as for concert rendition.

Some of them, for example his Kalinga Nartana Natangam (Tillana style piece) have also been rendered in Bhagavata Mela Operas.

In recent times, several of Venkata Kavi's compositions, such as Udajagopa (Umabharanam), have been arranged & presented by various Western Classical Orchestras in various parts of the world.

== See also ==
- List of Carnatic composers
