= His Highness Abdullah =

- Theatrical release poster
- Directed by: Sibi Malayil
- Written by: A. K. Lohithadas
- Produced by: Mohanlal
- Starring: Mohanlal; Nedumudi Venu; Gautami; Sreenivasan; Thikkurissy Sukumaran Nair; Mamukkoya
- Cinematography: Anandakuttan
- Edited by: L. Bhoominathan
- Music by: Songs: Raveendran; Background Score: Mohan Sitara; Lyrics: Kaithapram
- Production company: Pranavam Arts
- Distributed by: Seven Arts Release
- Release date: 30 March 1990 (Kerala)
- Running time: 150 minutes
- Country: India
- Language: Malayalam

His Highness Abdullah is a 1990 Indian Malayalam-language musical drama film written by A. K. Lohithadas and directed by Sibi Malayil. It stars Mohanlal, Nedumudi Venu, Gautami, Sreenivasan, Thikkurissy Sukumaran Nair and Mamukkoya. This film was later remade in Tamil as Mettukudi .The film was produced by Mohanlal and was the debut production of his company Pranavam Arts. The music for the songs was composed by Raveendran and the background score by Mohan Sithara. His Highness Abdullah was the same team's first film in a trilogy of Indian classical arts films, followed by Bharatham (1991) and Kamaladalam (1992).

The story follows Abdullah (Mohanlal), a low-life Sufi Muslim Qawwali singer in Bombay, who is hired by the members of a wealthy royal Hindu family to assassinate their family head, Maharaja Udayavarma (Venu). Abdullah infiltrates the palace in the guise of a Brahmin classical singer, Ananthan Namboothiri, and tries to assassinate the Maharaja by gaining his confidence.

His Highness Abdullah was released on 30 March 1990. It performed well at the box office, becoming the highest-grossing Malayalam film of the year. The film's soundtrack was also well received. The film won two National Film Awards—Best Supporting Actor for Venu and Best Male Playback Singer for M. G. Sreekumar for the song "Naadaroopini". Raveendran won the Filmfare Award for Best Music Director – Malayalam.

This movie was loosely remade (or freemade) as Aadhavan by K S Ravikumar in 2009.

== Plot ==
Ravi Varma, his father Prabhakara Varma, Rajaraja Varma, and his father Kesava Pillai, seek methods to kill King Udaya Varma Thampuran to usurp his wealth. Udaya Varma's wife Bhagirathi Thampuratti has fallen into depression after the untimely death of their son Unni. She is locked up at home and looked after by Udaya Varma's daughter Radha. Ravi Varma and the group fear that Udaya Varma might will his wealth to Radha, being his adopted daughter, who is believed to be born of an illicit relationship of Thampuran's relative with another servant. The group is helped by Cheriyachan Thampuran, the blind uncle of Thampuran, who also eyes King's wealth. He advises the group on the plans to eliminate the King upon the condition of sharing the wealth with him.

As per his advice, Ravi Varma, the King's eldest nephew, travels to Mumbai in search of a killer. There he meets Jamal who helps him. He introduces Ravi Varma to Abdullah, who is a singer in Mumbai. Abdullah is in need of money and, upon persuasion from Jamal, comes to Kerala planning to kill Thampuran. Abdullah disguises himself as Ananthan Namboothiri and meets Thampuran stating that he is Ravi Varma's friend who wants to study the palace. Thampuran does not like this, however, he allows him to stay a couple of days at the palace. Bhagirathi Thampuratti thinks Ananthan is Unni and shows stages of recovery from a mental disorder with his presence.

Once, the day Thampuran asks Ananthan to leave arrives, he sings the famous "Pramadhavanam" song, which impresses Thampuran and he starts liking him. Radha falls in love with him. Ananthan is even permitted to dine with Thampuran after having developed a strong relationship with him. Gupthan, the King's younger nephew, on finding that Radha is in love with Ananthan, misleads Ramanattukara Ananthan Namboodirippad, a famous musician, telling him that Ananthan has portrayed him as a good for nothing fellow. Enraged by hearing this, Namboodirippad travels to the palace and competes with Ananthan, singing the famous "Devasabhathalam", after which he understands that Gupthan mislead him and is highly impressed with Ananthan.

Ravi Varma and the group wants Thampuran to be killed immediately. Ananthan one day realises that Thampuran is an old friend of his father. Thampuran also tells Ananthan that Radha was brought up by him as his daughter after the demise of Unni. Thampuran also requests Ananthan to marry her. Ananthan, unable to kill Thampuran pleads to the group that he cannot kill him. The group gets angry and Ravi Varma travels to Mumbai a second time to find another killer. He comes back with Kabir, a goon from Bombay to kill Thampuran. Thampuran identifies that Ananthan is a Muslim named Abdullah when he accidentally sees Ananthan and Jamal performing daily Namaz.

Thampuran is furious with Ananthan and angrily demand to know who he really is. Ananthan feeling guilty tells Thampuran that he's Abdullah and that he was hired to kill him. Ananthan tells Thampuran that he is surrounded by enemies from his own family, and he can save him. But Thampuran refuses and demands him to leave the palace. The next morning, Thampuran is found to have disappeared. Kabir and his other goons/henchmen try to find Thampuran and indulge in a fight with Ananthan. Ananthan overpowers him and the group and they all, along with all the greedy relatives, run away from the palace. After the fight is over, Ananthan releases Thampuran, whom he had locked up in a room in order to save him from Kabir. Thampuran shockingly realises that Ananthan is his friend's son and feels sorry for having disbelieved him. He requests Ananthan to stay in the palace as Unni and marry Radha. He names Radha as the successor to all his wealth. Ananthan accepts the request from Thampuran.

== Cast ==
- Mohanlal as Abdullah / Ananthan Namboothiri, the man who is hired to kill Udaya Varma Thampuran
- Nedumudi Venu as Maharaja Udaya Varma
- Gautami as Radhika (Radha), Udaya Varma's foster daughter
- Sreenivasan as Ravi Varma, Udaya Varma's nephew
- Mamukkoya as Jamal / Sankunni Nair, Abdullah's friend and helper
- Kaithapram Damodaran Namboothiri as Ramanattukkara Ananthan Namboothiri
- Kaviyoor Ponnamma as Bhagirathi Valiya Thampuratti, Udaya Varma's mentally ill wife
- Thikkurissy Sukumaran Nair as Mathilakkathu Cheriyachan Thampuran ('Shaguni'), Udaya Varma's blind greedy uncle
- Jagadish as Gupthan Thampuran, Udaya Varma's nephew
- Maniyanpilla Raju as Rajaraja Varma, Udaya Varma's nephew
- Sankaradi as Raman Menon, Palace secretary and Thampuran's confidante
- M. G. Soman as Kesava Pillai, Subhadra's husband and Rajan's father
- Karamana Janardhanan as Prabhakara Varma, Janaki's husband and Ravi Varma's father
- Kunchan as Balaraman Thampuran, Cheriyachan Thampuran's grandson
- Sukumari as Janaki Varma, Udaya Varma's younger sister and Ravi Varma's mother
- K. P. A. C. Lalitha as Subhadra Varma, Udaya Varma's younger sister and Rajaraja Varma's mother
- Valsala Menon as Madhavi Varma, Udaya Varma's younger sister and Gupthan's mother
- M. S. Thripunithura as Namboothiri, Madhavi's husband and Gupthan's father
- Paravoor Bharathan as Palace Chamberlain Kunjikrishna Menon, Thampuran's shrewd
- Shyama as Soudamini Varma, Janaki Varma's daughter
- Suma Jayaram as Ambika Varma, Subhadra Varma's daughter
- Gurbachan Singh as Kabir Dada, professional killer from Bombay
- Mohan Jose as Chandran Nair, professional killer From Bombay
- Mafia Sasi as professional killer from Bombay
- Santhakumari as Saraswathy
- Rajeev Rangan as Kochu Raman, Ananthan Namboothiri's son

== Production ==
His Highness Abdullah was produced by Mohanlal and was the debut production of his company Pranavam Arts.

== Music ==
His Highness Abdullah

Soundtrack album by Raveendran
- Released: March 15, 1990
- Recorded: January 1990
- Studios: AVM "RR" Recording Theatre, Chennai
- Genre: Film soundtrack
- Label: Tharangini

The film score was composed by Mohan Sithara while the songs were composed by Raveendran, with lyrics written by Kaithapram. All songs are in Malayalam, except the Sufi-type song "Tu Badi Masha Allah", which is set in a mix of Hindi and Urdu.

| Track | Song title | Singer(s) | Other notes |
|---|---|---|---|
| 1 | "Pramadhavanam" | K. J. Yesudas | Picturised on Mohanlal. Raagam: Jog |
| 2 | "Devasabhathalam" | K. J. Yesudas, Raveendran, Sharreth | Another version, in which M. G. Sreekumar replaces Raveendran Master, was also recorded. But Raveendran's version was selected in the movie. The song is picturised on Mohanlal and Kaithapram. Raagam: Raagamaalika (Hindolam, Hanumatodi, Panthuvarali, Abhogi, Mohanam, Shanmukhapriya, Sankarabharanam, Kalyani, Chakravakam, Revati) |
| 3 | "Naadaroopini" | M. G. Sreekumar | M. G. Sreekumar won the National Film Award for Best Male Playback Singer. The song is picturised on Kaithapram. Raagam: Kanada |
| 4 | "Gopika Vasantham" | K. J. Yesudas, K. S. Chithra | Duet song picturised on Mohanlal and Gautami. Raagam: Shanmukhapriya |
| 5 | "Devasabhathalam" | K. J. Yesudas, M. G. Sreekumar, Sharreth | Raagam: Raagamaalika (Hindolam, Thodi, Panthuvarali, Abhogi, Mohanam, Shanmukhapriya, Sankarabharanam, Kalyani, Chakravakam, Revati) |
| 6 | "Tu Badi Maasha Allah" | K. J. Yesudas, Chorus | A Hindi-Urdu Qawwali song picturised on Mohanlal and Miss Kim. Lyrics by Madhu (Bihar). Raagam: Patdeep/Gowrimanohari |

== Reception ==
His Highness Abdullah performed well at the box office, and the top-grossing Malayalam film of the year. The film was a success in Tamil Nadu too. NKS of The Indian Express praises the film writing, "Rich with a fest of light classical songs, and taking its own time to stress the clash and play of emotions that is helped greatly by sensitive performances from Mohanlal and Nedumudi Venu, the film is a clean gripping entertainment for the family." Praising Mohanlal's performance he writes, "Mohanlal [...] takes a challenging role in His Highness Abdullah and not only acquits himself well but shows he is an actor of some range".

== Awards ==
- Nedumudi Venu won the National Film Award for Best Supporting Actor
- M. G. Sreekumar won the National Film Award for Best Male Playback Singer (for the song "Naadaroopini")
- Mohanlal won the Ujala Award and Kerala Movie Goers Award for Best Actor
- Raveendran won the Filmfare Award for Best Music Director – Malayalam

== Remakes and inspirations ==
The film was remade in Tamil as Mettukudi (1996). The 2009 Tamil film Aadhavan, starring Suriya and its 2016 Bangladeshi remake titled Shikari, starring Shakib Khan were reported to be based on this film. The core plot of the 2015 Kannada film Raja Rajendra was reported to be based on this film.
