= Kamaladalam =

1992 film by Sibi Malayil

- Poster
- Directed by: Sibi Malayil
- Written by: A. K. Lohithadas
- Produced by: Mohanlal
- Starring: Mohanlal; Monisha; Parvathi Jayaram; Vineeth
- Cinematography: Anandakuttan
- Edited by: L. Bhoominathan
- Music by: Raveendran (Songs); Johnson (Score)
- Production company: Pranavam Arts
- Distributed by: Seven Arts Release
- Release date: 27 March 1992
- Running time: 150 minutes
- Country: India
- Language: Malayalam

Kamaladalam (transl. Lotus petal) is a 1992 Indian Malayalam-language musical drama film written by A. K. Lohithadas and directed by Sibi Malayil, starring Mohanlal, Murali, Vineeth, Nedumudi Venu, Thikkurissy Sukumaran Nair, Monisha, Parvathy Jayaram and Sukumari. The film was produced by Mohanlal through his company Pranavam Arts and features original songs composed by Raveendran with a background score by Johnson. The story was inspired by the Telugu film Sagara Sangamam directed by K. Viswanath. Mohanlal's performance was praised.

== Plot ==
Nandagopan is a respected dance teacher at Kerala Kala Mandiram (alludes to the famed Kerala Kalamandalam of performing arts). However his life takes an unexpected turn when his wife Sumangala commits suicide following a spat between them, causing him to become an alcoholic and compulsive rule breaker.

He becomes moody and consumed with his grief for Sumangala, and takes it out on the students and the management of the institution. One of his students, Malavika, a Bharatanatyam student is an excellent upcoming dancer but is rebuked by Nandagopan multiple times over small mistakes. Soman is a Kathakali student of the Kala Mandiram, and is in love with Malavika.

On the day of Malavikas Arangettam, Nandagopan decides to test her focus and creates chaos and the Arangettam doesn't happen. The students strike in protest under the leadership of Soman, demanding Nandagopan's apology or resignation. Malavika questions Nandagopan about his qualities as a teacher. Nandagopan gives a lecture about the qualities of a good dancer to everyone using his knowledge about Natya Sastra and Abhinaya Darpanam stressing the impact of expressions and interpretation by the dancer. He gives a demonstration of his thoughts with a dance. Everyone claps at the end of it and Malavika is impressed. The audience does not ask for his apology again.

One day when Malavika requests Nandagopan to become her guru (teacher) by giving him dakshina. Nandagopan becomes her teacher. Malavika's friends advise her not to show excessive possessiveness or interest on Nandagopan.

One a day of excessive drinking, Malavika questions Nandagopan about it and he recounts his past to her. He mentions that he had composed Sita Ramayana exclusively for Sumangala. Malavika tells him the world should know about him and his abilities and that she would like to perform the dance. Nandagopan starts training Malavika for the performance.

Meanwhile, the closeness between Nandagopan and Malavika leads to many unfounded rumors about their relationship. Soman is unhappy with this development and decides to get rid of Nandagopan. On the day Malavika's performance, he mixes pesticide in a bottle of soft drink with the intention of killing Nandagopan.

Nandagopan takes the drink before the performance and by the time Soman realizes that the relationship between Nandagopan and Malavika is innocent, it is too late.

Nandagopan dies in the arms of Malavika and Soman at the end of the performance, while imagining Sumangala beckoning him towards her.

== Cast ==
- Mohanlal as Nandagopan, a respected dance teacher at the Kerala Kala Mandiram
- Monisha as Malavika Nangyar, A talented dance student at the Kerala Kala Mandiram
- Parvathy Jayaram as Sumangala aka Suma, Nandagopan's wife
- Vineeth as Somashekharanunni or Soman, Malavika's lover
- Murali as Madhavanunni, Somashekharanunni's elder brother
- Oduvil Unnikrishnan as Ravunni Nambeesan Aasan, Malavika's father and Principal of Kerala Kala Mandiram
- Nedumudi Venu as Velayudhan, Secretary of Kerala Kala Mandiram
- Thikkurissy Sukumaran Nair as Director of Kerala Kala Mandiram (as Himself)
- Sukumari as Dance Teacher at Kerala Kala Mandiram
- Bindu Panicker as Madhavanunni's wife
- Mamukoya as Kala Mandiram Hydrose, Nandagopan's friend
- Kozhikode Shantha Devi as Nandagopan's mother
- Santhakumari as Malavika's mother
- Kozhikode Narayanan Nair as Lambodharan, Nadagopan's uncle
- Valsala Menon as Dance Teacher at Kerala Kala Mandiram
- Bobby Kottarakkara as Manu, a Mridangam Teacher at Kerala Kala Mandiram
- Kunchan as Sankaran, a staff at Kerala Kala Mandiram
- Alummoodan as Theatrical troupe owner
- Nandu as Ramu, student at kala mandiram
- Yadu Krishnan
- Suma Jayaram as Maya, cameo role in Nandagopan's "Pennukanal"

== Soundtrack ==
Kamaladalam

Soundtrack album by Raveendran
- Released: 1992
- Genre: Soundtrack
- Labels: Ranjini Cassettes; Satyam Audios
- Producer: Pranavam Arts

Raveendran chronology
Abhimanyu (1991)	Kamaladalam (1992)	Aham (1992)

The acclaimed soundtrack of this movie was composed by Raveendran, for which the acclaimed lyrics were penned by Kaithapram and Alaipayuthey by Oothukkadu Venkatasubba Iyer.

Track	Song title	Singer(s)	Raga
1	"Premodaaranay"	K. J. Yesudas, K. S. Chithra	Kambhoji
2	"Alaipayuthey"	Kanhangad Ramachandran	Kanada
3	"Sayanthanam"	K. J. Yesudas	Maand
4	"Aananda Nadanam"	Latha Raju	Bilahari
5	"Aananda Nadanam"	K. J. Yesudas	Raagamalika (Bilahari, Hindolam, Darbari Kanada, Devagandhari, Sankarabharanam)
6	"Kamaladalam Mizhiyil"	M. G. Sreekumar, Sujatha	Raagamalika (Shanmukhapriya, Mohanam)
7	"Sayanthanam"	K. S. Chithra	Maand
8	"Jayagajamukhane"	Kanhangad Ramachandran	Atana, Amritavarshini
9	"Sumuhoorthamaay"	K. J. Yesudas	Ragamalika (Hamsadhwani, Abhogi, Saramati, Hamsanandi, Madhyamavathi)

== Release ==
=== Reception ===
The film was a critical and commercial success. The film had a 150-day run in Kerala. The performances of Mohanlal, Parvathy, Vineeth and Monisha were well received. It was one of the last films acted by Monisha before her death. This film was one of the biggest hits in Parvathy's career.

The role of Nandagopan is considered to be one of the best performances by Mohanlal since the role demanded a subtle combination of his theatrical and dancing skills. He learned his steps in short period under the guidance of Nattuvan Paramasivam. He was highly praised for his dancing presentation, even without being a trained dancer.

=== Awards ===
Kerala Film Critics Association Awards

- Best Song Lyricist - Kaithapram
- Best Male Playback Singer - K. J. Yesudas
- Special Jury Award - Oduvil Unnikrishnan

Kerala Film Chamber Award

- Best Music Director - Raveendran
- Best Male Playback Singer - K. J. Yesudas
