= Valaji =

Janya raga of Carnatic music

- Arohanam: S G₃ P D₂ N₂ Ṡ
- Avarohanam: Ṡ N₂ D₂ P G₃ S

Valaji or Valachi is a rāgam in Carnatic music (musical scale of South Indian classical music). It is a pentatonic scale (audava or owdava rāgam, which means "of 5"). It is a janya rāgam (derived scale), as it does not have all the seven swaras (musical notes). The equivalent of Valaji in Hindustani music is Kalāvati.

== Structure and Lakshana ==
Valaji scale with shadjam at C

Valaji is a symmetric rāgam that does not contain rishabham or madhyamam. It is a pentatonic scale (audava-audava rāgam in Carnatic music classification). Its ārohaṇa-avarohaṇa structure (ascending and descending scale) is as follows (see swaras in Carnatic music for details on below notation and terms):

- ārohaṇa : S G₃ P D₂ N₂ Ṡ (Note: Alternate notations: Hindustani: S G P D Ṉ Ṡ; Western: C E G A B♭ C)
- avarohaṇa : Ṡ N₂ D₂ P G₃ S (Note: Alternate notations: Hindustani: Ṡ Ṉ D P G S; Western: C B♭ A G E C)

(the notes used in this scale are shadjam, antara gandharam, panchamam, chathusruthi dhaivatham and kaisiki nishadham)

Valaji is considered a janya rāgam of Chakravakam, the 16th Melakarta rāgam, though it can be derived from other melakarta rāgams, Harikambhoji, Vagadheeswari, Ramapriya, Vachaspati or Nasikabhooshani, by dropping both rishabham and madhyamam. Since Chakravakam is lowest in ordinal number among these 6 melakarta scales, Valaji is associated with it.

== Popular compositions ==
Valaji is a pleasing scale, but has only a few compositions in classical music. It has been used to score film music as well. Here are some popular compositions composed in Valaji.

- Chalamu Seya (Varnam) by Lalgudi Jayaraman
- Anname Aruginil Va (Varnam) by Sri Subbudu
- Devadi Deva (Varnam) by Binni Krishnakumar
- Jalandhara Supithasthe Japa Kusuma Bhasure by Muthiah Bhagavatar
- Santatamu Ninne by G. N. Balasubramaniam
- Sri Gayatri by Saint Gnanananda Tirtha (Sri Ogirala Veera Raghava Sarma)
- Tandava Priya by Kalyani Varadarajan
- Dari Yavudayya and Nachike Padabeda by Purandara Dasa
- Padhame Thunai by Papanasam Sivan
- Kai Vidamattan by Natarajasundaram Pillai
- Maha Tripurasundari by N. S. Chidambaram
- Kandarpa Janaka by Annamacharya

== Related rāgams ==
This section covers the theoretical and scientific aspect of this rāgam.

=== Graha bhedam ===
Valaji's notes when shifted using Graha bhedam, yields another pentatonic rāgam Abhogi. Graha bhedam is the step taken in keeping the relative note frequencies same, while shifting the shadjam to the next note in the rāgam. For more details and illustration of this concept refer Graha bhedam on Abhogi.

=== Scale similarities ===
- Malayamarutam is a rāgam which has shuddha rishabham in both ascending and descending scales in addition to the notes in Valaji. Its ārohaṇa-avarohaṇa structure is S R₁ G₃ P D₂ N₂ Ṡ: Ṡ N₂ D₂ P G₃ R₁ S
- Nagasvaravali is a rāgam which has the shuddha madhyamam in place of the nishadam. Its ārohaṇa-avarohaṇa structure is S G₃ M₁ P D₂ Ṡ: Ṡ D₂ P M₁ G₃ S
- Mohanam is a rāgam which has the chathusruti rishabham in place of the nishadam. Its ārohaṇa-avarohaṇa structure is S R₂ G₃ P D₂ Ṡ: Ṡ D₂ P G₃ R₂ S

== Film Songs ==
=== Language: Tamil ===
Song	Movie	Year	Composer	Singer
Naan Indri Yaar Vaaruvaar(Ragamalika: Abhogi, Valaji)	Maalaiyitta Mangai	1958	Viswanathan–Ramamoorthy	T. R. Mahalingam, A. P. Komala
Vasantha Kaalam Varumo	Marakka Mudiyumaa?	1966	T. K. Ramamoorthy	P. Suseela, K. J. Yesudas
Yeriyile Oru Kashmir Roja (Ragamalika: Kedar/Hamirkalyani, Valaji)	Madhanamaaligai		M. B. Sreenivasan	P. Suseela, K. J. Yesudas
Unnai Yenni Yennai	Ragasiya Police 115	1968	M. S. Viswanathan	P. Suseela
Pottu Vaitha Mugamo	Sumathi En Sundari	1971	M. S. Viswanathan	S. P. Balasubrahmanyam, B. Vasantha
Thatti Sellum	Thanga Pathakkam	1974	M. S. Viswanathan	Vani Jayaram, Sai Baba
Pongum Kadalosai	Meenava Nanban	1977	M. S. Viswanathan	Vani Jairam
Govardhanan Vanthan	Raga Bandhangal		Kunnakudi Vaidyanathan	Vani Jairam
Kudumbathin Thalaivi Kulavilakku	Olimayamaana Ethirkaalam		Vijaya Bhaskar	Vani Jairam
Devi Sridevi	Kavyamela		V. Dakshinamoorthy	P. Leela
Oru Paarvai Nooru Kavithai(unreleased) (Ragamalika:Valaji, Sahana, Kalyana Vasantham, Bhairavi )	Manoranjitham		V. Kumar	T. M. Soundararajan, Vani Jayaram
Naayagan Avan Orupuram	Oru Vidukadhai Oru Thodarkadhai	1979	Gangai Amaran	K.J. Yesudas, S. Janaki
Naan Irukka Bayam Edarkku	Neethiyin Marupakkam	1985	Ilaiyaraaja	S. Janaki
Parvai Theril	Hemavin Kadhalargal	1985	Raveendran	S. P. Balasubrahmanyam
Naan Thantha Maalai	Ottumangani		Shankar–Ganesh	S. P. Balasubrahmanyam, Vani Jairam
Azhagana Sandhangal	Adhu Antha Kaalam	1988	Chandrabose	K.J. Yesudas, Vani Jairam
Poo Ondruthaan	Aboorva Nanbargal	1991	Chandrabose	K. S. Chithra
Paattuku Yaar Ingu Pallavi	Band Master	1993	Deva	S.P. Balasubrahmanyam, K. S. Chithra
Kanchi Kamatchi	Killadi Mappillai	1994	Deva	Mano
Thirukona Moolam	Desam	2004	A. R. Rahman	S.P. Balasubrahmanyam, Master Vignesh, Baby Pooja
Yedhukkaga Enna	Rummy	2014	D. Imman	Santhosh Hariharan, AV Pooja

=== Language: Telugu ===
Song	Movie	Year	Lyricist	Composer	Singer
Siva Pujaku Chigurinchina Siri Siri Muvva	Swarnakamalam	1988	Sirivennela Seetharama Sastry	Ilaiyaraja	S.P. Balasubrahmaniam, P. Susheela
