= Sreeragam =

- Directed by: George Kithu
- Starring: Jayaram; Vinduja Menon; Sudheesh; Geetha
- Music by: Kanhangad Ramachandran
- Release date: 1 December 1995
- Country: India
- Language: Malayalam

Sreeragam is a 1995 Indian Malayalam-language film, directed by George Kithu. The film stars Jayaram, Vinduja Menon, Sudheesh and Geetha. The film had musical score by Kanhangad Ramachandran.

== Cast ==
- Jayaram as Venkiteswaran
- Vinduja Menon as Rugmini
- Sudheesh as Vaithi
- Geetha as Indu
- Nedumudi Venu as Periya Shasthri
- Sukumari
- Riza Bava as Narasimhan
- M. S. Thripunithura as Harihara Iyer
- Madhupal as Gopu
- Oduvil Unnikrishnan as Indu's father
- Meera as Venkideshwarn's sister

== Soundtrack ==
- "PadavarnnaTharivalayilaki" - KJ Yesudas, KS Chithra
- "Dudukugala" - Kanhangad Ramachandran, Sreepriya Chandran, Supriya Chandran
- "Raavinte" - KS Chithra, Kanhangad Ramachandran
- "Neelakkadakkannil" - KS Chithra, Kanhangad Ramachandran
- "Sreegananaadha Sindooravarnna" - Kanhangad Ramachandran
- "Omanappoonthinkal" - KJ Yesudas, Supriya Chandran
- "Chalamelera" - Kanhangad Ramachandran
- "Kanakaangi swaravaahini" - KJ Yesudas, Kanhangad Ramachandran
- "Shambho" - Kanhangad Ramachandran
- "Sree Raagam" - KJ Yesudas
- "Raavinte (female)" - KS Chithra
