= Neethiyin Marupakkam =

1985 film by S. A. Chandrasekhar

- Directed by: S. A. Chandrasekhar
- Screenplay by: S. A. Chandrasekhar
- Story by: Shoba
- Produced by: Shoba
- Starring: Vijayakanth; Radhika
- Music by: Ilaiyaraaja
- Production company: V. V. Creations
- Release date: 27 September 1985
- Running time: 121 minutes
- Country: India
- Language: Tamil

Neethiyin Marupakkam (transl. The other side of justice) is a 1985 Indian Tamil-language action drama film directed by S. A. Chandrasekhar and produced by his wife Shoba Chandrasekhar. The film stars Vijayakanth and Radikaa, alongside Anuradha, Vadivukkarasi, and V. K. Ramasamy in supporting roles. It was released on 27 September 1985.

== Cast ==
- Vijayakanth as Vijayakumar
- Radikaa as Marikozhundhu
- Anuradha
- Vadivukkarasi
- V. K. Ramasamy
- Senthil
- Y. Vijaya
- Senthamarai
- Radha Ravi
- Jaishankar
- Vinu Chakravarthy
- Major Sundarrajan
- Thideer Kannaiah
- Idichapuli Selvaraj
- S. A. Chandrasekhar

== Production ==
The film was originally titled Naan Naxalite Alla (transl. I am not a Naxalite), which was changed after the censor board objected.

== Soundtrack ==
The music was composed by Ilaiyaraaja. The song "Naan Irukka Bayam Edarkku" is set in the Valaji raga.

Song	Singers	Lyricist
"Maalai Karukkalil"	K. J. Yesudas, S. Janaki	Pulamaipithan
"Maalai Karukkalil" (Pathos)	K. J. Yesudas	Pulamaipithan
"Hey Pulla"	K.S.Chithra, B. S. Sasirekha, S. P. Sailaja	Mu. Metha
"Naan Irukka Bayam Edarkku"	S. Janaki, Saibaba	Vaali
"Naan Oru Kani"	Vani Jairam	Muthulingam
"Pottikadai"	Ilaiyaraaja, Shoba Chandrasekhar	Gangai Amaran
"Janana Manana"	S.Janaki, S. N. Surendar	Vairamuthu

== Critical reception ==
Jayamanmadhan of Kalki criticised the film for being formulaic. However, Balumani of Anna praised the film's cast, direction and the message.
