= Karnataka Shuddha Saveri =

Janya raga of Carnatic music

Karnataka Suddha Saveri
- Arohanam: S R₁ M₁ P D₁ Ṡ
- Avarohanam: Ṡ D₁ P M₁ R₁ S

Karnataka Shuddha Saveri is a rāgam in Carnatic music (musical scale of South Indian classical music). It is an audava rāgam (or owdava rāgam, meaning pentatonic scale). It is a janya rāgam (derived scale), as it does not have all the seven swaras (musical notes).

This scale is known as Shuddha Sāveri in the Muthuswami Dikshitar school of music. This scale is quite different from the popular Shuddha Saveri pentatonic scale, which is known as Devakriya in Dikshitar school of music.

== Structure and Lakshana ==
Karnataka Shuddha Saveri scale with shadjam at C

Karnataka Shuddha Saveri is a symmetric rāgam that does not contain gandharam or nishādam. It is a symmetric pentatonic scale (audava-audava ragam in Carnatic music classification - audava meaning 'of 5'). Its ārohaṇa-avarohaṇa structure (ascending and descending scale) is as follows (see swaras in Carnatic music for details on below notation and terms):

- ārohaṇa : S R₁ M₁ P D₁ Ṡ (Note: Alternate notations: Hindustani: S Ṟ M P Ḏ Ṡ; Western: C D♭ F G A♭ C)
- avarohaṇa : Ṡ D₁ P M₁ R₁ S (Note: Alternate notations: Hindustani: Ṡ Ḏ P M Ṟ S; Western: C A♭ G F D♭ C)

The notes used in this scale are shadjam, shuddha rishabham, shuddha madhyamam, panchamam and shuddha dhaivatham. It is considered a janya rāgam of Kanakangi, the 1st Melakarta rāgam, though it can be derived from 8 other melakarta rāgams, by dropping both gandharam and nishādam.

=== Scale similarities ===
- Saveri is a rāgam which has the ascending scale of Karnataka Shuddha Saveri and descending scale of Mayamalavagowla. Its ārohaṇa-avarohaṇa structure is S R1 M1 P D1 S : S N3 D1 P M1 G3 R1 S
- Gunakri is a raga from the Hindustani tradition with identical intervals which is sometimes classified in the same group.
