= Salaga Bhairavi =

Janya raga of Carnatic music

- Arohanam: S R₂ M₁ P D₂ Ṡ
- Avarohanam: Ṡ N₂ D₂ P M₁ G₂ R₂ S

Salaga Bhairavi (sālaga bhairavi) is a rāgam in Carnatic music (musical scale of South Indian classical music). It is a janya rāgam (derived scale) from the 22nd melakarta scale Kharaharapriya. It is a janya scale, as it does not have all the seven swaras (musical notes) in the ascending scale. It is a combination of the pentatonic scale Shuddha Saveri and the sampurna raga scale Kharaharapriya.

According to the Muthuswami Dikshitar school, this scale is of shadava-sampoorna type derived from Kharaharapriya scale.

== Structure and Lakshana ==
Ascending scale with shadjam at C, which is same as Shuddha Saveri scale

Descending scale with shadjam at C, which is same as Kharaharapriya scale

Salaga Bhairavi is an asymmetric rāgam that does not contain gandharam or nishadham in the ascending scale. It is an audava-sampurna rāgam (or owdava rāgam, meaning pentatonic ascending scale). Its ārohaṇa-avarohaṇa structure (ascending and descending scale) is as follows:

- ārohaṇa : S R₂ M₁ P D₂ Ṡ (Note: Alternate notations: Hindustani: S R M P D Ṡ; Western: C D F G A C)
- avarohaṇa : Ṡ N₂ D₂ P M₁ G₂ R₂ S (Note: Alternate notations: Hindustani: Ṡ Ṉ D P M G̱ R S; Western: C B♭ A G F E♭ D C)

The notes used in this scale are shadjam, chatusruti rishabham, shuddha madhyamam, panchamam and chatusruti dhaivatam in ascending scale, with kaisiki nishadham and sadharana gandharam included in descending scale. For the details of the notations and terms, see swaras in Carnatic music.
