= Oothukadu =

Ootthukkaatu
- village
- Interactive map of Ootthukkaatu
- Coordinates: 10°52′59″N 79°18′38″E
- Country: India
- State: Tamil Nadu
- District: Thiruvarur
- Taluk: Valangaiman

Languages
  - Official: Tamil
- Time zone: UTC+5:30 (IST)
- PIN: 612701

Oothukkadu is a small village in the Valangaiman taaluk of the Thiruvarur district of the state of Tamil Nadu in southeastern India. This place is Famous for The Kalinga narthana krishna Temple and the great singer Oothukkadu Venkata Kavi.

== Kalinga narthana krishna Temple ==
The main deity of Oothukkaadu village is Lord Veda Naarayanar flanked by goddesses Sridevi and Bhudevi on either side. The temple gained popularity after the discovery of the panchaloha idol of Kaalinga Narthana Perumaal from the temple tank. It is believed that sage Naaradha witnessed the Kaalinga Narthanam that Lord Krishnaa performed in front of the divine cows Nandini and Patti, children of Kaamadhenu. Sage Naaradha prayed to Krishnaa to remain in the village in the dance posture and bless the devotees. Hence it is believed that Lord Krishnaa remained in the dancing posture in Oothukkadu.

The idol of Sri Kaalinga Narthana Perumaal within the inner sanctuary of the temple is about 2.5 ft high. Lord Krishnaa, portrayed as a five-year-old boy, is seen dancing with His left foot on the serpent's head and his right leg in the air. Krishna is depicted holding the tail of the serpent with His left hand and showing Abhaya Mudra with His right hand. It is so intricately sculpted that one can insert a thin piece of paper between the Lord's left leg and the head of the serpent. According to the temple Bhattachaarya, the beauty is that the weight of the Lord's body rests on the left hand that holds the serpent's tail. One can also see the scars on the right leg of Lord Krishna formed due to the violent beating from Kaalinga's tail.

The shrine has gained fame as a "Parihaara Sthalam" for "Raahu Dosham" and "Sarpa Dosham."

The shrine is also visited by devotees who pray for quick settlement of marriage alliances and birth of offspring.

== Songs associated with the temple ==
Mahaakavi Venkatasa Subbhayyar, popularly known as Venkata Kavi, who lived in the 17th century CE spent his entire life in front of the thulasi mada composing a number of melodious songs in praise of this deity. Due to the extreme devotion of Sri Venkata Kavi to the Lord, he is believed to be a reincarnation of Sage Naaradha who witnessed the Lord's dance in the village.

Some of the famous songs of Venkata Kavi are: "Swaagatham Krishna", "Alai Paayudhe", "Aadaadhu Asangaadhu Va Kannaa" and "Thaaye Yasodha". Others are "Paal Vadiyum Mukham", "Asaindaadum mayil", "Enna Punniyam". The starting verses of some of these songs can be found on the temple walls. It is believed that Lord Krishnaa appeared in person and danced to these melodies. Lord Krishnaa also performed the entire Kaalinga Nartthanam for the pleasure of Sri Venkata Kavi.

== Directions and temple hours ==
The temple is close to Kumbakonam. It is on the way to Aavoor from Kumbakonam about 1 km from the main road. The directions to the temple are clearly on the Kumbakonam-Aavoor-Thirukkarukaavur road.

The temple hours are from 10 a.m. to 12 noon and from 5 p.m. to 7.30 p.m. Special puja is performed every month on the day of Rohini, birth star of Lord Krishnaa.
