= Revati (raga) =

Janya raga of Carnatic music

Revati is a rāgam in Carnatic music (musical scale of South Indian classical music). It is an audava rāgam (or owdava rāgam, meaning pentatonic scale). It is a janya rāgam (derived scale), as it does not have all the seven swaras (musical notes).

In Hindustani music a raga that closely resembles Revati is Bairagi Bhairav. It is said to evoke Karuṇa rasa (pathos). This scale has also been used in chanting Vedas.

== Structure and Lakshana ==
Revati is a symmetric rāgam that does not contain gāndhāram or dhaivatam. It is a pentatonic scale (audava-audava ragam in Carnatic music classification – audava meaning 'of 5'). Its ārohaṇa-avarohaṇa structure (ascending and descending scale) is as follows (see swaras in Carnatic music for details on below notation and terms):

- ārohaṇa : S R₁ M₁ P N₂ Ṡ (Note: Alternate notations: Hindustani: S Ṟ M P Ṉ Ṡ; Western: C D♭ F G B♭ C)
- avarohaṇa : Ṡ N₂ P M₁ R₁ S (Note: Alternate notations: Hindustani: Ṡ Ṉ P M Ṟ S; Western: C B♭ G F D♭ C)

(notes used in this scale are shuddha rishabham, shuddha madhyamam, panchamam, kaisiki nishadham)

Revati is considered a janya rāgam of Ratnangi, the 2nd Melakarta rāgam, though it can be derived from other melakarta rāgams, Vanaspati, Hanumatodi, Natakapriya, Vakulabharanam or Chakravakam, by dropping both gāndhāram and dhaivatam.
