= Jog (raga) =

Raga in Hindustani classical music

Ram Narayan performs Jog at the Shiraz Arts Festival in Iran in the 1970s

Jog is a Raga in Hindustani classical music. It is one of the more popular ragas appearing often in films. Sometimes, experts assign this raga to be a member of Kafi thaat. In Carnatic music, raga Nata is similar to Jog.

== Structure ==
Raga Jog omits the second and the sixth intervals, Ri and Dha, making it pentatonic, or Audav in nature. In ascending, it uses Shuddha Ga, and in descending, it uses Komal Ga. It takes Raga Tilang for its base which itself is derived from Khamaj thaat.

The Arohana is: Sa Ga Ma Pa ni(komal) Sa' The Avarohana is: Sa' ni(komal) Pa Ma Ga(shuddha) Ma ga(komal) Sa

In the notes of the Western scale in the key of C, these roughly correspond to C, E, F, G, B♭, C; C, B♭, G, F, E, F, E♭, C.

== Time of the day ==
The raga is played during the late evening (9 PM – 12 night): 2nd Prahar of the night, Ratri ka Dwitiya Prahar

== Notable recordings in raga Jog ==
- Pramadhavanam by Raveendran Master in the 1990 Sibi Malayil film His Highness Abdullah,
- Dil Se Re by A R Rahman in the 1998 Mani Ratnam film Dil Se..
- Ravi Shankar on his 1956 album Three Ragas,
- Hariprasad Chaurasia & Zakir Hussain,
- Ali Akbar Khan & L Subramanian.
- Jnan Prakash Ghosh in 'Dhan Jo Ban Nadi Naav Sanjog' popularised by Pt. Ajay Chakravarty and Kaushiki Chakravarty
- Namo Namo Bharatambe, a patriotic classical song written by Swami Ramanacharanathirtha (Nochur Venkataraman), and composed and rendered in this raga by Kuldeep M Pai

== Film songs ==
=== Language: Tamil ===
Note that many songs here are also based on the Raga Nattai, the closest Carnatic equivalent of Jog, and a few are based on Tilang and Gambhira Nattai as well.

Song	Movie	Composer	Singer
Ventriduven Unnai(Ragamalika opening portion only)	Agathiyar	Kunnakudi Vaidyanathan	T. M. Soundararajan, Sirkazhi Govindarajan
Maanikkka Theril Maragatha	Thedi Vandha Mappillai	M. S. Viswanathan	T. M. Soundararajan, P. Susheela
Mahaganapathim	Sindhu Bhairavi	Illayaraja	K.J. Yesudas
Mettioli Katrodu (Starts with Suddha Dhanyasi)	Metti	Illayaraja	Illayaraja, S. Janaki(Humming only)
Kavithai Kelungal(Ragamalika)	Punnagai Mannan	Illayaraja	Vani Jairam
Aala Asathum	Kanni Rasi	Illayaraja	S. P. Balasubrahmanyam, Vani Jairam
Isai Paadu Nee	Isai Paadum Thendral	Illayaraja	S. Janaki
Oh Oh Oh Kaalai Kuyilgale	Unnai Vaazhthi Paadugiren	Illayaraja	S. Janaki
Holi Holi	Raasukutti	Illayaraja	S. P. Balasubrahmanyam, S. Janaki
Innum Ennai (Gambeeranattai with Tilang)	Singaravelan	Illayaraja	S. P. Balasubrahmanyam, S. Janaki
Podu Thanthanathom	Nalla Naal	Illayaraja	S. P. Balasubrahmanyam, S. Janaki
Panivizhum Malar Vanam (in Chalanattai)	Ninaivellam Nithya	Illayaraja	S. P. Balasubrahmanyam
Nan Deva devi	Thangakkili	Illayaraja	Mano, Swarnalatha
Inge Iraivan	Sir.I Love You	Illayaraja	Mano, P. Susheela
Oru Pattampochi	Kadhalukku Mariyadhai	Illayaraja	K.J. Yesudas, Sujatha
Naan Ondru Kettal	Ilayaragam	Illayaraja	Arunmozhi, K.S. Chitra
Peigaley Nambathey	Mahanadhi	Illayaraja	Kamal Haasan, Shanmugasundari
Sandhosha Kannire	Uyire	A. R. Rahman	A. R. Rahman, Anuradha Sriram, Anupama, Febi Mani
Unnai Kelai	Desam	A. R. Rahman	Hariharan & T. L. Maharajan
Spiderman	New	A. R. Rahman	Kunal Ganjawala, Sadhana Sargam
Narumugaiye Narumugaiye	Iruvar	A. R. Rahman	P. Unnikrishnan, Bombay Jayashree
Vennila Vennila	Iruvar	A. R. Rahman	Asha Bhosle
Thom Thom	Alli Thandha Vaanam	Vidyasagar	Hariharan, K.S. Chitra
Oru Nimidamaa	Thithikudhe	Vidyasagar	Tippu, Srivarthini
Thangamagan Indru	Baashha	Deva	K.J. Yesudas, K.S. Chitra
Devi Devi	Santharpam	Deva	S. P. Balasubrahmanyam, Uma Ramanan
Mudhalam Santhippil	Charlie Chaplin	Bharani	P. Unnikrishnan, Swarnalatha
Solaigal Ellam	Pookkalai Parikkatheergal	T. Rajendar	S. P. Balasubrahmanyam, K.S. Chitra
Vasantham Paadi Vara	Rail Payanangalil	T. Rajendar	S. P. Balasubrahmanyam, S. Janaki
Sogam Eni Ellai	Vaaname Ellai	Maragathamani	S. P. Balasubrahmanyam & Maragadha Mani(Chorus)
Uyire Uyire	Vaanam Vasappadum	Mahesh Mahadevan	Hariharan, Ganga
Iyengaru Veetu Azhagey	Anniyan	Harris Jayaraj	Hariharan, Harini
Chennai Senthamizh (copy of Mahaganapathim)	M. Kumaran Son of Mahalakshmi	Srikanth Deva	Harish Raghavendra
Aagayam Kanatha	Unakkum Enakkum	Devi Sri Prasad	S. P. Balasubrahmanyam
Jingunamani	Jilla	D. Imman	Ranjith, Sunidhi Chauhan
Ammukuttiye	Gemini Ganeshanum Suruli Raajanum	D. Imman	Pradeep Kumar
Uraiyum Theeyil	Sita Ramam	Vishal Chandrashekhar	Yazin Nizar

=== Language: Kannada ===
Song	Movie	Composer	Singer
Badukina Bannave	Tagaru	Charanraj	Siddhartha Belmannu, Sanjith Hegde, Charanraj

=== Language: Malayalam ===
Song	Movie	Composer	Singer
Parayaan Maranna	Garshom	Ramesh Narayan	Hariharan
Kathil Thenmazhayay	Thumboli Kadappuram	Salil Chowdhury	K J Yesudas
Pramadavanam	His Highness Abdulla	Raveendran	K J Yesudas
Oru kili pattu moolave	Vadakumnathan	Raveendran	K J Yesudas, K S Chitra
varmukile	Mazha	Raveendran	K S Chitra
Iru Hrudayangalil	Oru Maymasa Pulariyil	Raveendran Master	

=== Language: Hindi ===
Song	Movie	Composer	Singer
Noor-Un-Ala	Meenaxi: A Tale of Three Cities	A. R. Rahman	Murtaza Khan, Qadir Khan, Palakkad Sreeram
Dil Se Re	Dil Se	A. R. Rahman	A. R. Rahman, Anuradha Sriram, Anupama, Febi Mani
Chale Chalo	Lagaan	A. R. Rahman	A. R. Rahman, Srinivas, Chorus
Yun hi Chala Chal	Swades	A. R. Rahman	Hariharan, Udit Narayan, Kailash Kher

== Non-film songs ==
Year	Film/Album	Language	Song	Singer(s)	Composer	Lyrics	Audio Label
2018	SUR Sandya	Sanskrit	"Ajam Nirvikalpam"	Uma Sheshgiri	Mahesh Mahadev	Adi Shankaracharya	PRISM Music
2019	Kandenu Sri Raganathana	Kannada	Athadyaniso Manuja	Priyadarshini	Mahesh Mahadev	Sri Yogi Nareyana	PM Audios
