= Navarasa kannada =

Janya raga of Carnatic music

- Arohanam: S G₃ M₁ P Ṡ
- Avarohanam: Ṡ N₂ D₂ M₁ G₃ R₂ S

Navarasa kannada or Navarasakannada is a rāgam in Carnatic music (musical scale of South Indian classical music). It is a janya rāgam (derived scale) from the 28th melakarta scale Harikambhoji. This scale is well suited for instrumental music, especially with veena and flute. It is suited for orchestral music as well.

== Structure and Lakshana ==
Ascending scale with shadjam at C

Descending scale with shadjam at C

Navarasa kannada is an asymmetric rāgam that does not contain rishabham, dhaivatam or nishādham in the ascending scale, while it does not have panchamam in descending scale. It is an svarantara-shadava rāgam (4 notes in ascending scale and 6 in descending scale). Its ārohaṇa-avarohaṇa structure (ascending and descending scale) is as follows:

- ārohaṇa : S G₃ M₁ P Ṡ (Note: Alternate notations: Hindustani: S G M P Ṡ; Western: C E F G C)
- avarohaṇa : Ṡ N₂ D₂ M₁ G₃ R₂ S (Note: Alternate notations: Hindustani: Ṡ Ṉ D M G R S; Western: C B♭ A F E D C)

The notes used in this scale are shadjam, antara gandhara, shuddha madhyamam and panchamam in ascending scale, with kaisiki nishadham, chathusruthi dhaivatham and chathusruthi rishabham included in descending scale while the panchamam is dropped from the same. For the details of the notations and terms, see swaras in Carnatic music.

== Popular compositions ==
There are a few compositions set to Navarasa kannada rāgam, which became popular due to the compositions of Tyagaraja.
