= N. S. Chidambaram =

Tamil journalist and scientific Tamil writer

N. S. Chidambaram is a Tamil journalist and Tamil scientific writer. He retired as a school physics teacher. For 19 years, he publishes a monthly magazine called Arivuchudar. He currently runs a monthly magazine called Ariviyal Oli. He received the National Science Award in year 2011 for this magazine. He also received Pure Tamil Media Award in the year 2021. The government of Tamil Nadu honoured him with a state award "Singharavelar Award for the year 2022" for his scientific writing in Tamil Language.

== Books ==
- Nobel Laureates of Physics (Volume 1–15)(நோபெல் பரிசு பெற்ற இயற்பியலறிஞர்கள் (1–15 தொகுதி))
