= Malayamarutam =

Janya raga of Carnatic music

- Arohanam: S R₁ G₃ P D₂ N₂ Ṡ
- Avarohanam: Ṡ N₂ D₂ P G₃ R₁ S

Malayamarutam is a rāgam in Carnatic music (musical scale of South Indian classical music). It is a janya rāgam (derived scale), as it does not have all the seven swaras (musical notes). This scale is used in Hindustani music in recent years by instrumentalists. This is a morning raga and regularly used in programmes and functions of the mornings.

== Structure and Lakshana ==
Malayamarutam scale with shadjam at C

Malayamarutam is a symmetric rāgam that does not contain madhyamam. It is a hexatonic scale (shadava-shadava rāgam in Carnatic music classification). Its ārohaṇa-avarohaṇa structure (ascending and descending scale) is as what follows (see swaras in Carnatic music for details on the below notation and terms):

- ārohaṇa : S R₁ G₃ P D₂ N₂ Ṡ (Note: Alternate notations: Hindustani: S Ṟ G P D Ṉ Ṡ; Western: C D♭ E G A B♭ C)
- avarohaṇa : Ṡ N₂ D₂ P G₃ R₁ S (Note: Alternate notations: Hindustani: Ṡ Ṉ D P G Ṟ S; Western: C B♭ A G E D♭ C)

The notes used in this scale are shadjam, shuddha rishabham, antara gandharam, panchamam, chathusruthi dhaivatham and kaisiki nishadam. Malayamarutam is considered a janya rāgam of Chakravakam, the 16th Melakarta rāgam, though it can be derived from Ramapriya also, by dropping madhyamam.

== Related rāgams ==
- Valaji is a rāgam which does not have shuddha rishabham in both ascending and descending scales compared to Malayamarutam. Its ārohaṇa-avarohaṇa structure is S G3 P D2 N2 S : S N2 D2 P G3 S
- Rasikaranjani is a ragam that does not have the nishadham in both arohana and avarohana compared to Malayamarutam.
