= Lal Salam =

Slogan created by communists in the Indian subcontinent

Lal Salam (transl."Red salute") is a salute, greeting, or code word used by communists in South Asia. The phrase is a compound of lāl, meaning "red" in Hindi–Urdu, and Salām, meaning "salute".
