= Sanchita Bhattacharyaa =

Indian dancer

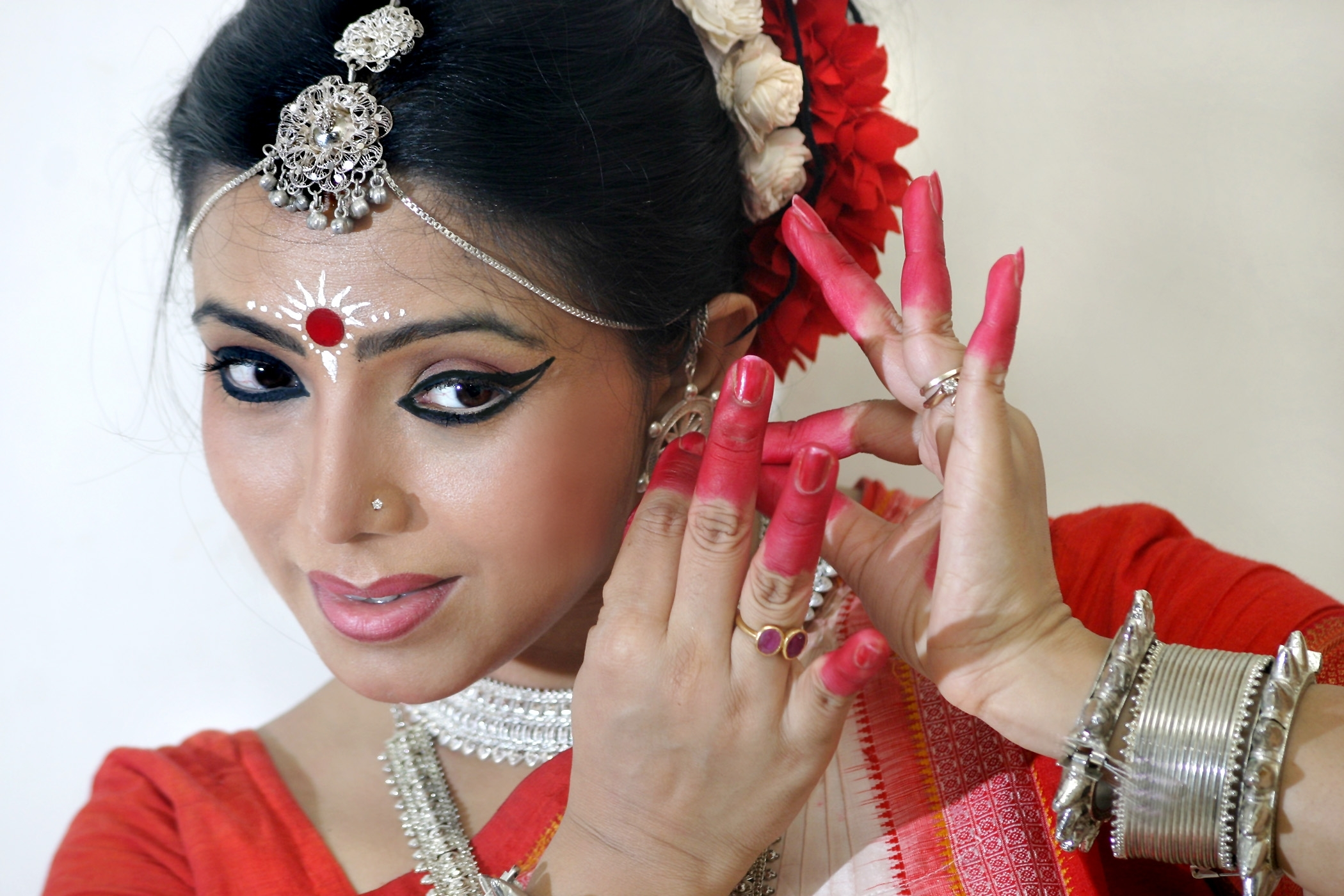
Guru Sanchita Bhattacharyaa

Sanchita Bhattacharyaa or Guru Sanchita Bhattacharyaa is an Indian Odissi dancer. She specializes in classical Odissi dance.

== Career ==
She has performed across India and abroad, including at New York's Madison Square Garden. She toured the US for charity funds. She was featured in a movie in the US. Its shooting is in progress.

The New York Times noted "her dance has been described as perfection". Odissi dancing dates back to the first and second century BC, and is one of India's oldest surviving dace forms.

== Personal life ==
She married Indian classical musician Tarun Bhattacharya.

== Performances ==
Her performances include:

In India:

- Sanket Mochan Festival - Varanasi
- Dovar Lane Music Conference
- National Maritime Day Celebration in India, 2008
- Jagannath Temple Puri
- Opening Ceremony of 1st India International Woman Festival
- Indian Spring Fest

Abroad:

- 25th Anniversary celebration of NABC at Madison Square Garden
- Esplanade Theatre - Singapore
- Grand Finale of India festival at North Carolina
- University of Minnesota - USA
- Hull Truck Theatre by kingston Government - UK

== Recognition ==
- Cultural Ambassador of India
- Sangeet Shyamala Award 2011
- Rash Ratna Award 2011 by Hinduthan Art and Music Society
- Dovar Lane Music Conference Award 2008
- Cultural Ambassador of India
- Kolkata Gaurav Samman 2007 by Indian Press

== Gallery ==
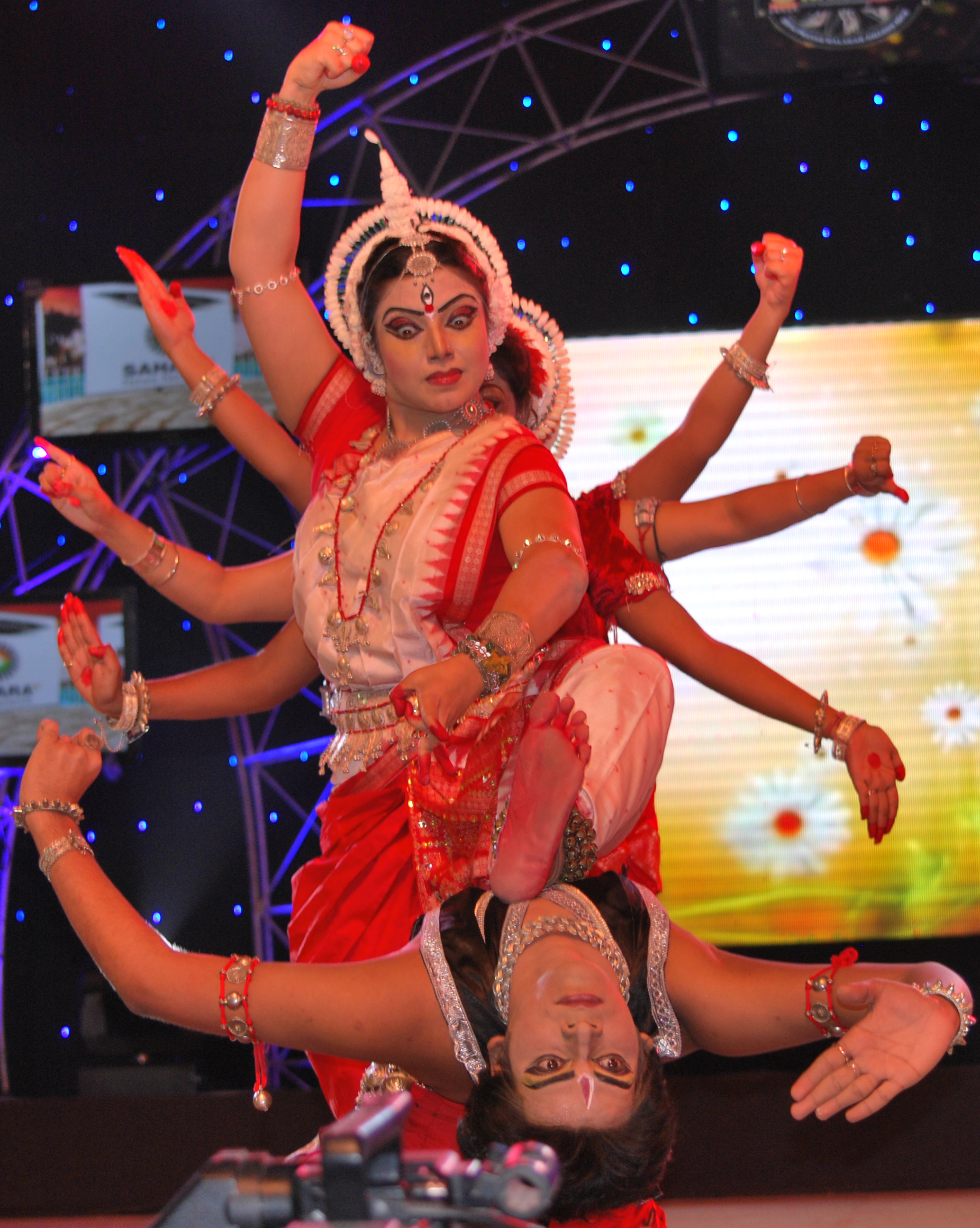
Bhattacharyaa dancing at Bharat Nirman Award

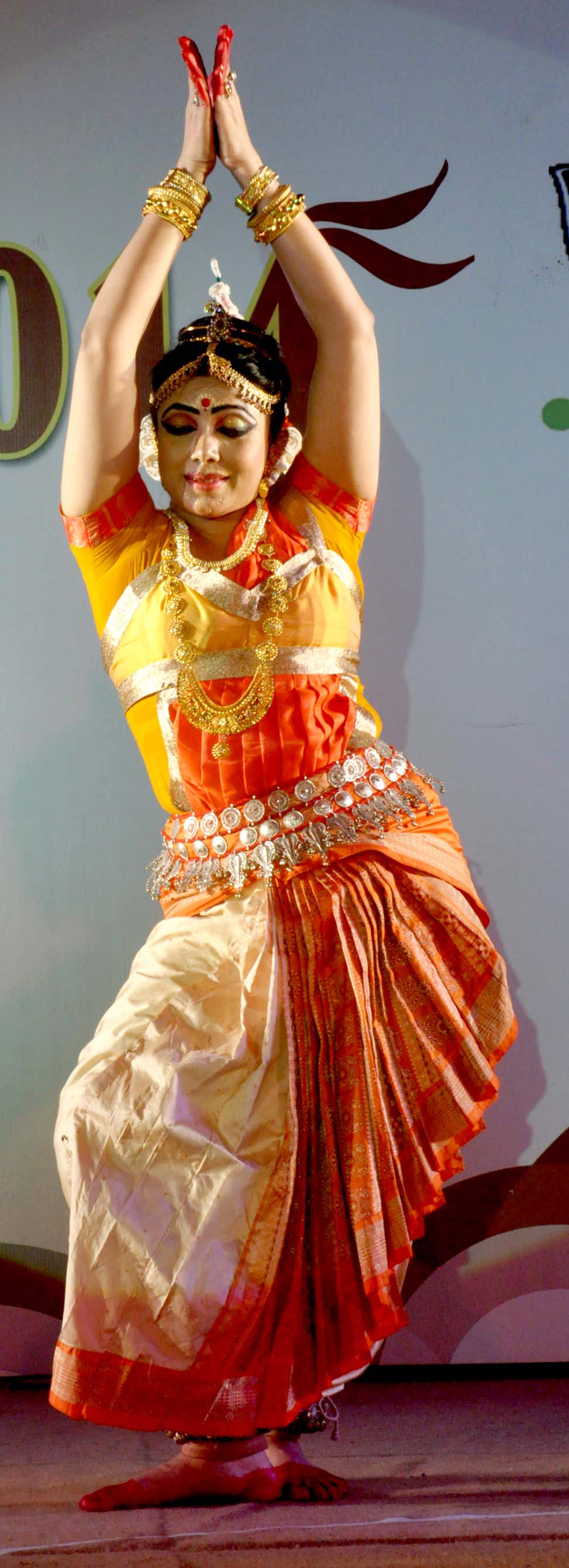
On 6 July Odissi dancer is performing Sanchita Bhattacharyaa dancing a Droupodi

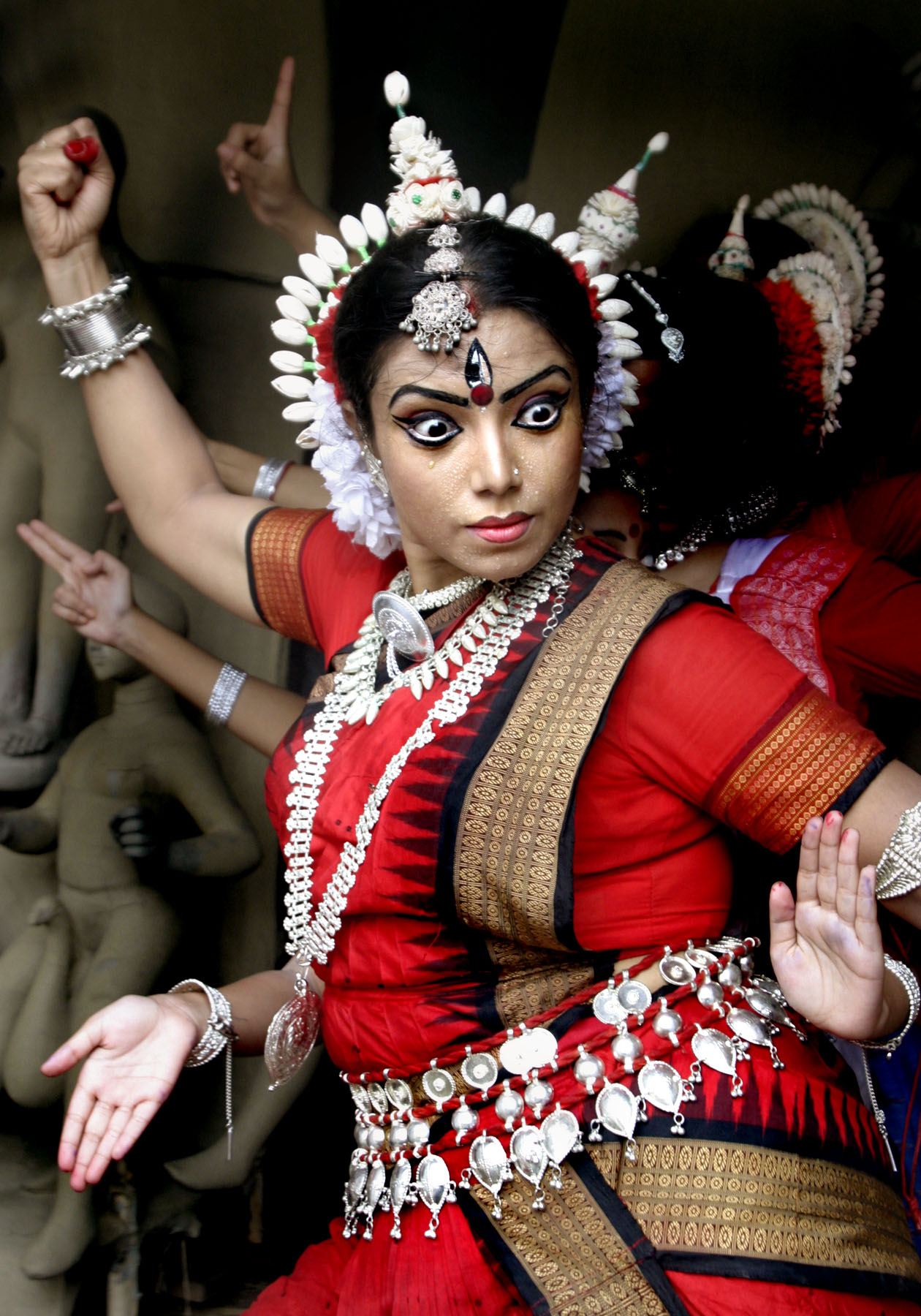
Bhattcharyaa and her troupe practicing to welcome the upcoming Durga Festival at Heritage house Sovabazar Rajbari in Calcutta on Saturday 17 September 2005.

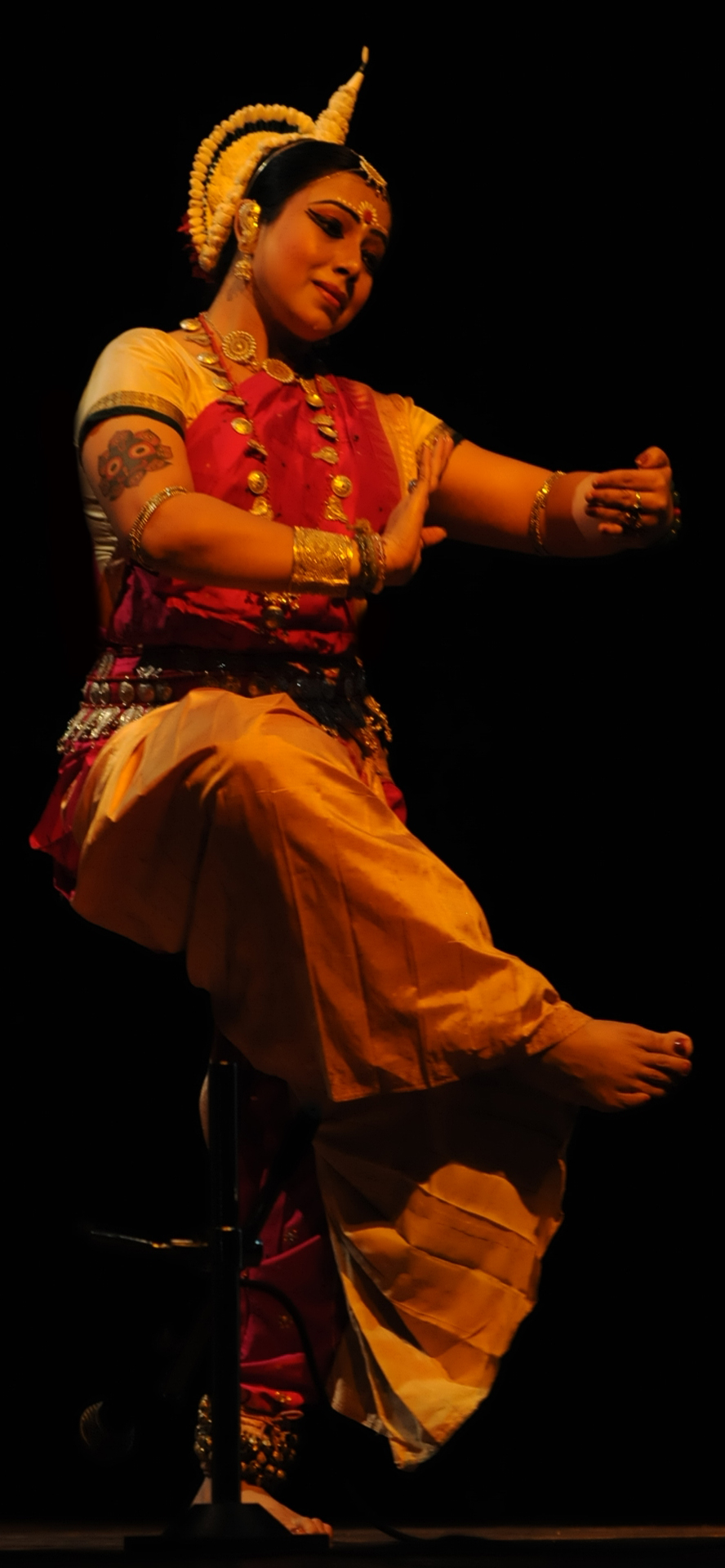
Bhattacharyaa Performing

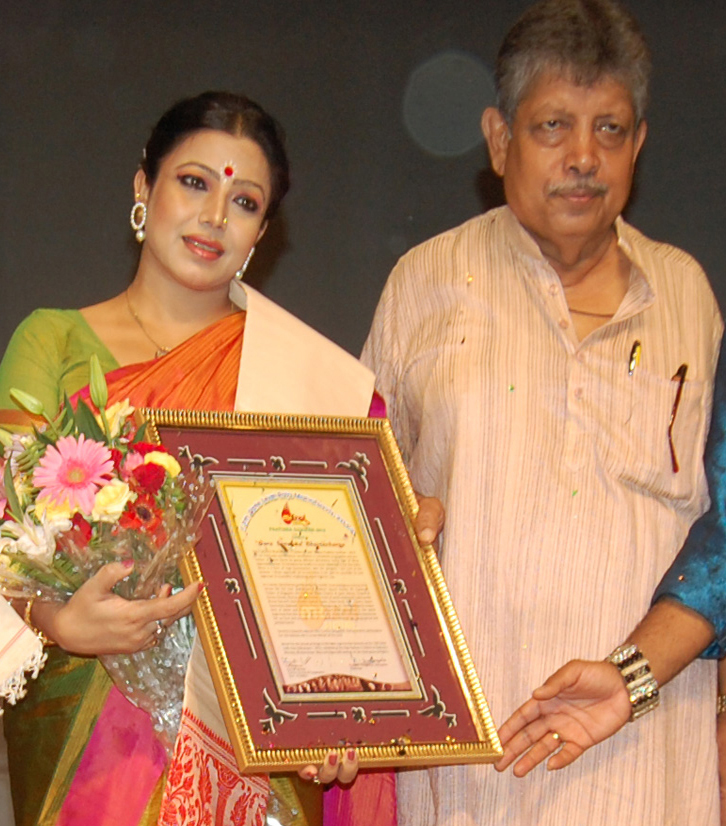
Bhattacharyaa Receiving Mashal Pratibha Samman

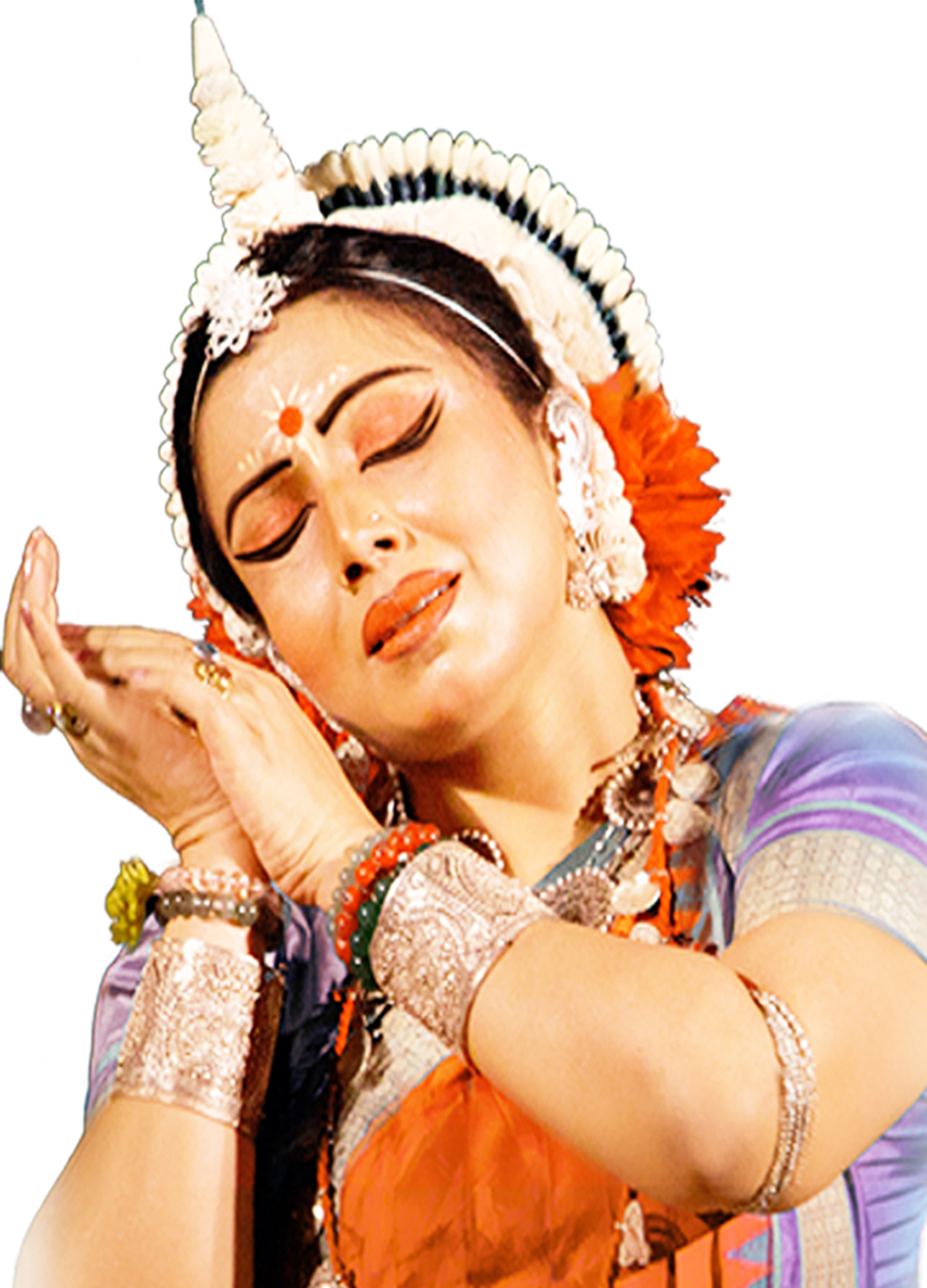
Bhattacharyaa performing an Odissi Dance

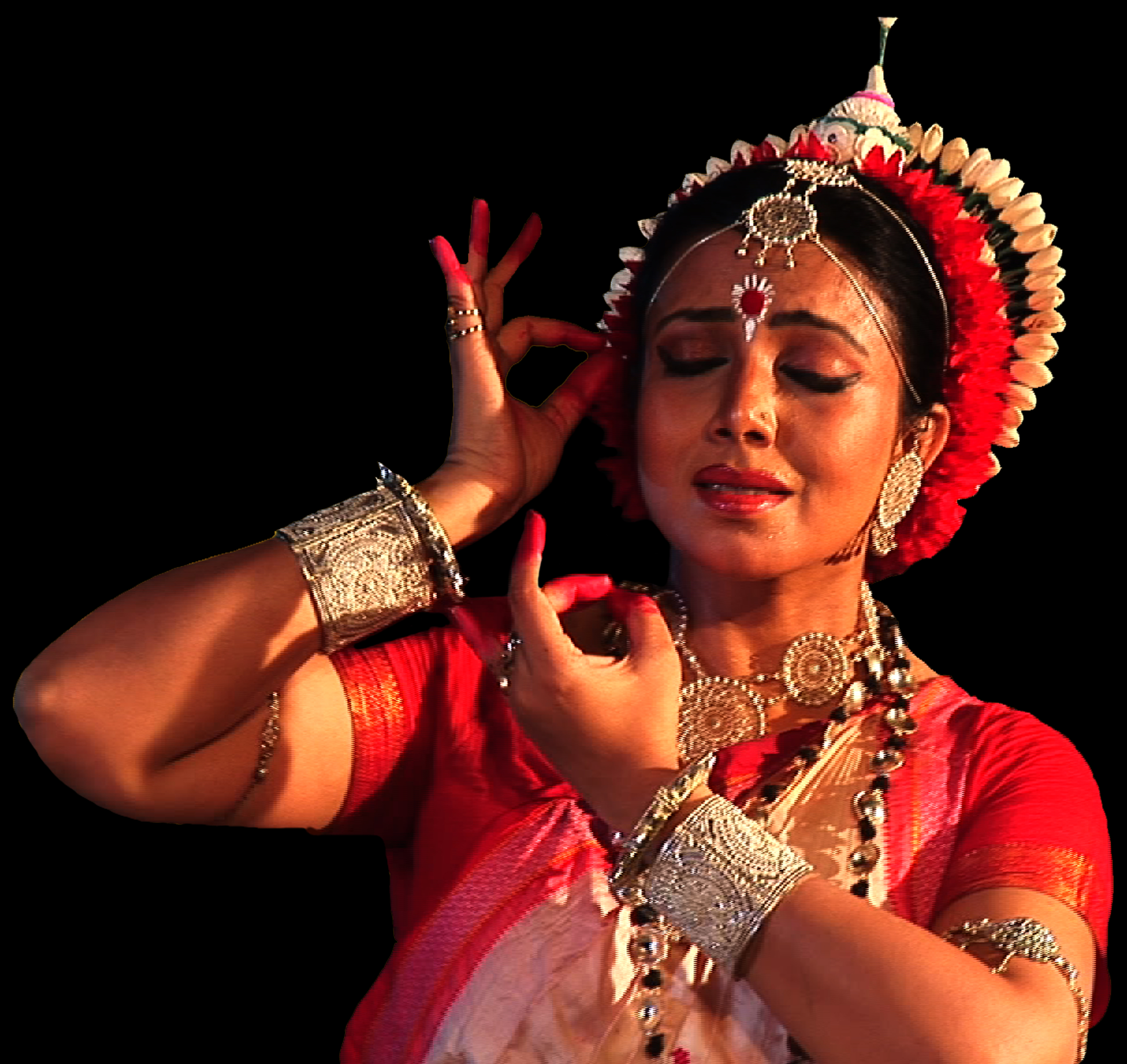
Bhattacharyaa performing as Inlay

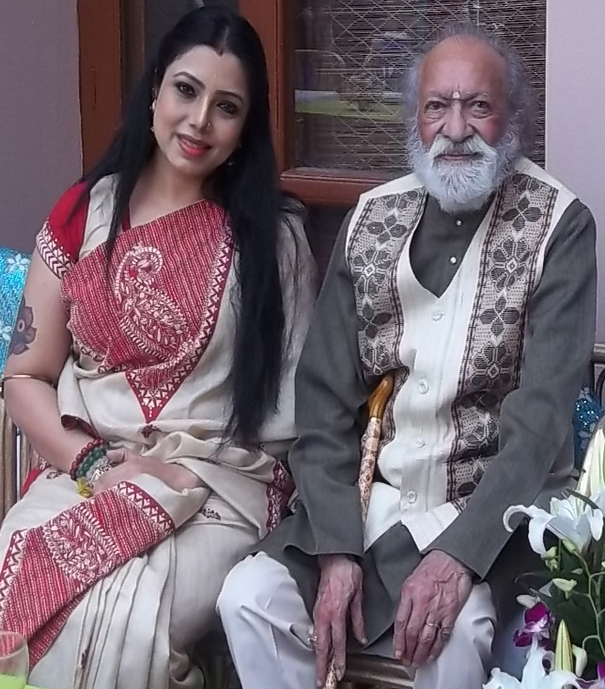
Bhattacharyaa with Bharat Ratna Pandit Ravi Shankarji

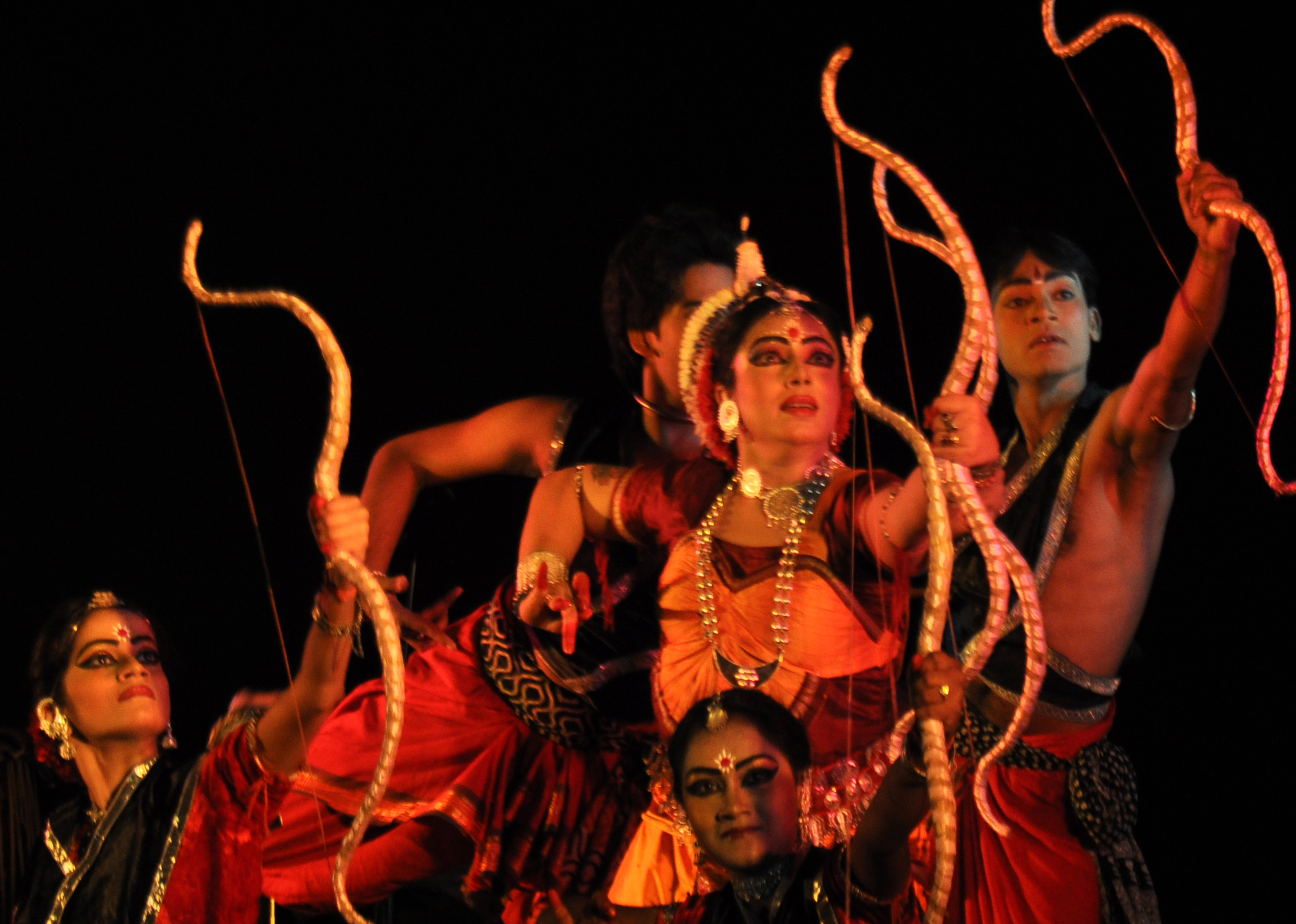
Bhattacharyaa performing The draupadi phenomenon (Tolly 1)

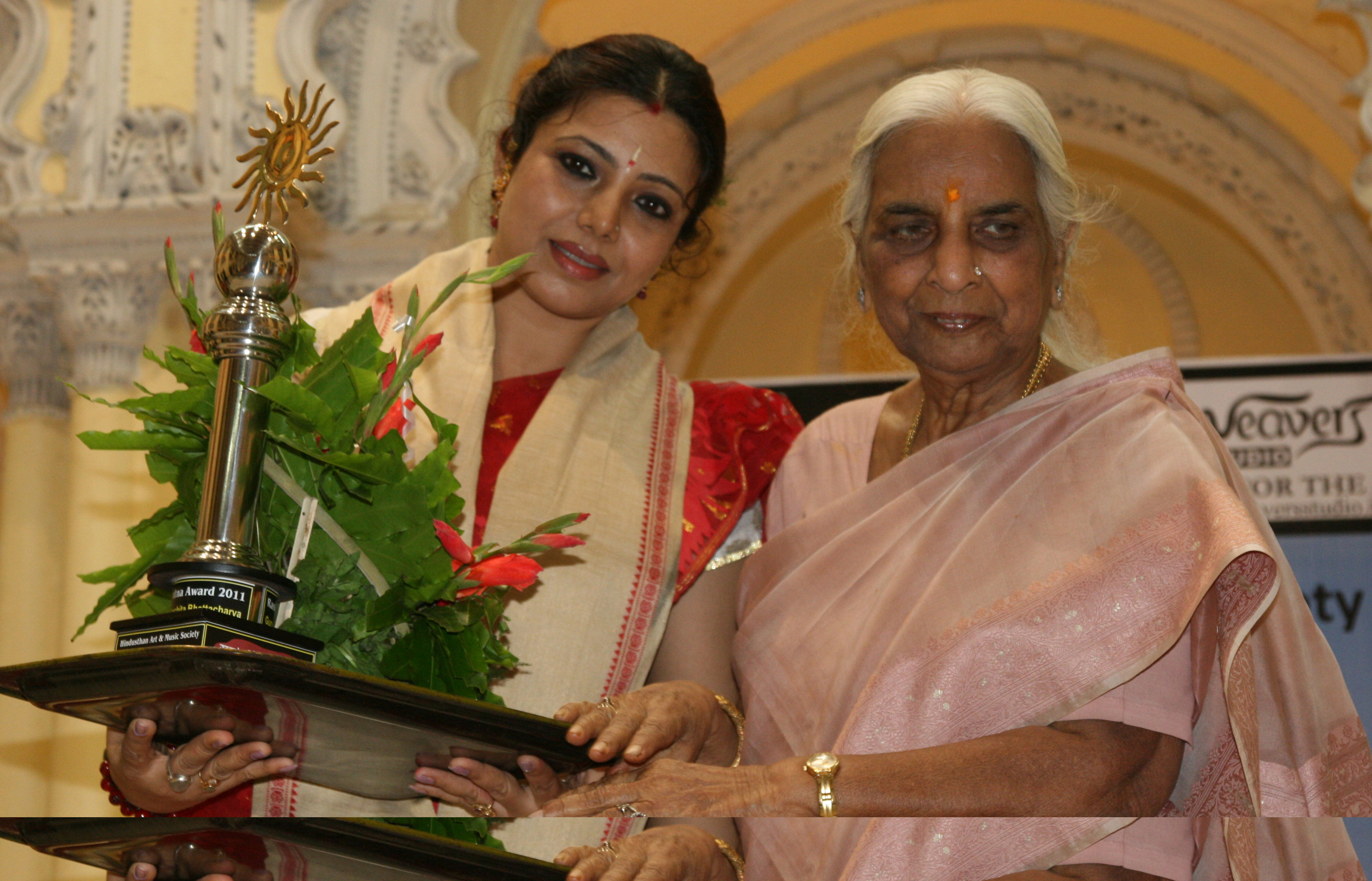
Bhattacharyaa, the Odissi Dancer receiving Raas Ratna Award from Padma Bhusan Girija Devi

== See also ==
- Tarun Bhattacharya
