= Shuddha Saveri =

Janya raga of Carnatic music

- Arohanam: S R₂ M₁ P D₂ Ṡ
- Avarohanam: Ṡ D₂ P M₁ R₂ S

Shuddha Saveri or śuddha sāveri is a ragam in Carnatic music (musical scale of South Indian classical music) and Yakshagana music. It is an audava rāgam (or owdava rāgam, meaning pentatonic scale). It is a janya rāgam (derived scale)of the Melakarta ragam Dhīraśaṅkarābharaṇaṃ which is 29th Melakarta raga. In Hindustani music it is called Durga. According to the school of Muthuswami Dikshitar, this rāgam is called Devakriya. Karnataka Shuddha Saveri, a janya rāgam of 1st melakarta Kanakangi, is called Shuddha Saveri by the Dikshitar school. Devakriya in the Tyagaraja school of music is a different Raga, which is a Janya of Natabhairavi(Mela 20).

== Structure and Lakshana ==
Shuddha Saveri scale with shadjam at C

Shuddha Saveri is a symmetric rāgam that does not contain gāndhāram or nishādam. It is a pentatonic scale (audava-audava ragam in Carnatic music classification – audava meaning 'of 5'). Its ārohaṇa-avarohaṇa structure (ascending and descending scale) is as follows (see swaras in Carnatic music for details on below notation and terms):

- ārohaṇa : S R₂ M₁ P D₂ Ṡ (Note: Alternate notations: Hindustani: S R M P D Ṡ; Western: C D F G A C)
- avarohaṇa : Ṡ D₂ P M₁ R₂ S (Note: Alternate notations: Hindustani: Ṡ D P M R S; Western: C A G F D C)

It is a scale that uses the following variants of the swaras – chatushruti rishabham, shuddha madhyamam, panchamam and chatushruti dhaivatam.

Shuddha Saveri is considered a janya rāgam of Sankarabharanam, the 29th melakarta rāgam, though it can be derived from other melakarta rāgams, Kharaharapriya, Gourimanohari or Harikambhoji, by dropping both gāndhāram and nishādam.

== Popular compositions ==
Here are some popular kritis composed in Shuddha Saveri.

- "Kalaharanamelaraa Hare" composed by Sri Tyagaraja
- "Thaaye Tripura Sundari" composed by Sri Periyasaamy Thooran
- "Ellorayum Polave" from the film Valli Thirumanam sung by S. G. Kittappa, the star of the film
- "Kovilmani Osai" from the film Kizhakke Pogum Rail, sung by Malaysia Vasudevan and S. Janaki
- "Radha Radha" from the film Meendum Kokila, sung by S. P. Balasubrahmanyam and S. Janaki
