= Ramapriya =

52nd raga in the Melakarta

- Arohanam: S R₁ G₃ M₂ P D₂ N₂ Ṡ
- Avarohanam: Ṡ N₂ D₂ P M₂ G₃ R₁ S
- Equivalent: Romanian major scale

Ramapriya (pronounced rāmapriya) is a rāgam in Carnatic music (musical scale of South Indian classical music). It is the 52nd melakarta rāgam (parent scale) in the 72 melakarta scale system of Carnatic music. It is called Ramāmanōhari in Muthuswami Dikshitar school of Carnatic music.

== Structure and Lakshana ==
Ramapriya scale with shadjam at C

It is the 4th rāgam in the 9th chakra Brahma. The mnemonic name is Brahma-Bhu. The mnemonic phrase is sa ra gu mi pa dhi ni. Its ārohaṇa-avarohaṇa structure (ascending and descending scale) is as follows (see swaras in Carnatic music for details on below notation and terms):

- ārohaṇa: S R₁ G₃ M₂ P D₂ N₂ Ṡ (Note: Alternate notations: Hindustani: S Ṟ G M̄ P D Ṉ Ṡ; Western: C D♭ E F♯ G A B♭ C)
- avarohaṇa: Ṡ N₂ D₂ P M₂ G₃ R₁ S (Note: Alternate notations: Hindustani: Ṡ Ṉ D P M̄ G Ṟ S; Western: C B♭ A G F♯ E D♭ C)

(the notes shuddha rishabham, antara gandharam, prati madhyamam, chathusruthi dhaivatham, kaisiki nishadham are used in this scale)

As it is a melakarta rāgam, by definition it is a sampoorna rāgam (has all seven notes in ascending and descending scale). It is the prati madhyamam equivalent of Chakravakam, which is the 16th melakarta scale.
