= Saramati =

Janya raga of Carnatic music

- Arohanam: S R₂ G₂ M₁ P D₁ N₂ Ṡ
- Avarohanam: Ṡ N₂ D₁ M₁ G₂ S

Saramati is a ragam in Carnatic music (musical scale of South Indian classical music). It is a janya rāgam (derived scale) from the 20th melakarta scale Natabhairavi. It is a janya scale, as it does not have all the seven swaras (musical notes) in the descending scale.

== Structure and Lakshana ==
Ascending scale with shadjam at C, which is same as Natabhairavi scale

Descending scale with shadjam at C, which is same as Hindolam scale

Saramati is an asymmetric rāgam that does not contain panchamam or rishabham in the descending scale. It is a combination of the sampurna raga scale Natabhairavi and pentatonic scale Hindolam. It is an sampurna-audava rāgam (or owdava rāgam, meaning pentatonic descending scale). Its ārohaṇa-avarohaṇa structure (ascending and descending scale) is as follows:

- ārohaṇa : S R₂ G₂ M₁ P D₁ N₂ Ṡ (Note: Alternate notations: Hindustani: S R G̱ M P Ḏ Ṉ Ṡ; Western: C D E♭ F G A♭ B♭ C)
- avarohaṇa : Ṡ N₂ D₁ M₁ G₂ S (Note: Alternate notations: Hindustani: Ṡ Ṉ Ḏ M G̱ S; Western: C B♭ A♭ F E♭ C)

The notes used in this scale are shadjam, chathusruthi rishabham, sadharana gandharam, panchamam, shuddha dhaivatham and kaisiki nishadham in ascending scale, with panchamam and rishabham dropped in descending scale. For the details of the notations and terms, see swaras in Carnatic music.
