= Kanhangad Ramachandran =

Indian singer and music director

Dr Kanhangad Ramachandran DLitt
- Origin: Cherukunnu, Kannur, Kerala
- Occupations: Singer, music director
- Instruments: Harmonium, violin, guitar, flute, jazz drum, keyboard, veena, tabala, mridangam
- Years active: 1976–present

Kanhangad Ramachandran is an Indian singer and music director from Kannur, Kerala. He was born to Shri. C. K Panicker, a master of classical musician in the Carnatic tradition of South India, and Smt. Panamanian.

In 1994, Kanhangad Ramachandran was honored with a golden shawl by K. J. Yesudas during a performance at Guruvayoor Temple. He received the Kerala Sangeetha Nataka Akademi Award for light music in 1996.

He set the Guinness World Record for playback singing, performing continuously for 25 hours.

== Works ==
=== As a composer ===
#	Movie	Director	Lyricists	Singers
1	Sreeragam (1995)	George Kithu	Kaithapram	K. J. Yesudas, Kanhangad Ramachandran, K. S. Chitra, Supriya Chandran, Sreepriy Chandran Kanhangad

=== As a singer ===
Year	Movie	Composer	Song(s)
1976	Panineer Mazha [Unreleased]	M. K. Arjunan	Ente Manassu
1978	Padmatheertham	K. V. Mahadevan	Kaarum Karutha Vavum
1992	Aanachandam [Unreleased]	Vidyadharan	Khanikal Asulabha
1992	Kamaladalam	Raveendran	Alaipaayuthey
1992	Kingini (Kurinji Pookunna Neram)	Kannur Rajan	Malar chorum
1992	Valayam	S. P. Venkatesh	Chambakamettile, Pulariyaay
1994	Raajasabha [Unreleased]	Raveendran	Prakrithi youvana
1994	Share Market ['Unreleased']	Raveendran	Aaromal saarangame
1995	Sreeraagam	Kanhangad Ramachandran	Chalamelera, Dudukugala, Kanakaangi swaravaahini, Neelakkadakkannil, Raavinte, Shambho, Sreegananaadha sindooravarnna
1995	Sunny Scooter [Unreleased]	Johnson	Dhanyudevadu
2007	Vaamanapuri	Stilju Arjun	Prakritheeshwariyude, Sumadala Shobhitha
