= Kanakangi =

First raga in the Melakarta

- Arohanam: S R₁ G₁ M₁ P D₁ N₁ Ṡ
- Avarohanam: Ṡ N₁ D₁ P M₁ G₁ R₁ S

Kanakangi (pronounced kanakāngi, meaning the golden bodied one) is a ragam in Carnatic music (musical scale of South Indian classical music). It is the 1st Melakarta rāgam in the 72 melakarta rāgam system of Carnatic music. It is called Kanakāmbari in the Muthuswami Dikshitar school.

== Structure and Lakshana ==
Kanakangi scale with shadjam at C

It is the 1st rāgam in the 1st chakra Indu. The mnemonic name is Indu-Pa. The mnemonic phrase is sa ra ga ma pa dha na. Its ārohaṇa-avarohaṇa structure (ascending and descending scale) has all shuddha swaras, as follows (see swaras in Carnatic music for details on below notation and terms):

- ārohaṇa: S R₁ G₁ M₁ P D₁ N₁ Ṡ (Note: Alternate notations: Hindustani: S Ṟ R M P Ḏ D Ṡ; Western: C D♭ E F G A♭ B C)
- avarohaṇa: Ṡ N₁ D₁ P M₁ G₁ R₁ S (Note: Alternate notations: Hindustani: Ṡ D Ḏ P M R Ṟ S; Western: C B A♭ G F E D♭ C)

(the notes are shuddha rishabham, shuddha gandharam, shuddha madhyamam, panchamam, shuddha dhaivatham, shuddha nishadham)

It is a sampurna rāgam – a rāgam that has all seven swaras (notes) and is often dubbed the shuddha scale, owing to its swarasthanas. It is the shuddha madhyamam equivalent of Salagam, which is the 37th melakarta.

== Asampurna Melakarta ==
Kanakāmbari is the 1st Melakarta in the original list compiled by Venkatamakhin. The notes used in the scale are the same, but the ascending scale is different. It is an audava-sampurna raga (5 notes in ascending scale, while full 7 are used in descending scale).

- ārohaṇa: S R₁ M₁ P D₁ Ṡ (Note: Alternate notations: Hindustani: S Ṟ M P Ḏ Ṡ; Western: C D♭ F G A♭ C)
- avarohaṇa: S N₁ D₁ P M₁ G₁ R₁ S (Note: Alternate notations: Hindustani: S D Ḏ P M R Ṟ S; Western: C B A♭ G F E D♭ C)

== Janya rāgams ==
Kanakangi has a few janya ragams associated with it, of which Karnātaka shuddha sāveri and Lavangi (a recent addition to Carnatic music by Dr. M. Balamuralikrishna) are a little popular.

See List of janya rāgams for a full list of Kanakangi's janyas.
