= Chakravakam (raga) =

Musical scale in South Indian classical music

- Arohanam: S R₁ G₃ M₁ P D₂ N₂ Ṡ
- Avarohanam: Ṡ N₂ D₂ P M₁ G₃ R₁ S

Chakravakam or Chakravaham (pronounced chakravākam) is a rāgam in Carnatic music (musical scale in South Indian classical music). It is the 16th Melakarta rāgam (parent rāgam) in the 72 melakarta rāgam system. According to the Muthuswami Dikshitar school, this rāgam is called Tōyavēgavāhini. Chakravakam is similar to Raga Ahir bhairav in Hindustani music.

Chakravakam is a raga that is known to incite feelings of devotion, sympathy and compassion in the listeners.

== Structure and Lakshana ==
Chakravakam scale with Shadjam at C

It is the 4th melakarta in the 3rd chakra- Agni. The mnemonic name is Agni-Bhu. The mnemonic phrase is sa ra gu ma pa dhi ni. Its ārohaṇa-avarohaṇa structure (ascending and descending scale) is as follows (see swaras in Carnatic music for details on below notation and terms):

- ārohaṇa : S R₁ G₃ M₁ P D₂ N₂ Ṡ (Note: Alternate notations: Hindustani: S Ṟ G M P D Ṉ Ṡ; Western: C D♭ E F G A B♭ C)
- avarohaṇa : Ṡ N₂ D₂ P M₁ G₃ R₁ S (Note: Alternate notations: Hindustani: Ṡ Ṉ D P M G Ṟ S; Western: C B♭ A G F E D♭ C)

The notes in this scale are shadjam, shuddha rishabham, anthara gandharam, shuddha madhyamam, panchamam, chathusruthi dhaivatham and kaisiki nishadham.

It is a sampoorna rāgam - rāgam having all 7 swarams. It is the suddha madhyamam equivalent of Ramapriya, which is the 52nd melakarta.

Chakravakam is different from Mayamalavagowla in some ways, while playing. The Ri Ga ma notes are played a bit flatter than Mayamalavagowla, making it sound more restrained than Mayamalavagowla. The Da and Ni are played somewhat like Hari Kambhoji, giving the overall tune, to be restrained and devotional essence

== Asampurna Melakarta ==
Tōyavēgavāhini is the 16th Melakarta in the original list compiled by Venkatamakhin. The notes used in the scale are the same and the ascending scale and descending scale are same.

== Janya rāgams ==
Chakravakam has quite a few janya rāgams (derived scales) associated with it, of which Bindumalini, Malayamarutam and Valaji are popular.
