= Shanmukhapriya =

56th raga in the Melakarta

- Arohanam: S R₂ G₂ M₂ P D₁ N₂ Ṡ
- Avarohanam: Ṡ N₂ D₁ P M₂ G₂ R₂ S

Shanmukhapriya is a ragam in Carnatic music (musical scale of South Indian classical music). It is the 56th melakarta rāgam (parent scale) in the 72 melakarta rāgam system of Carnatic music. It is called Chāmaram in Muthuswami Dikshitar school of Carnatic music. It is said to be borrowed into Hindustani music from Carnatic music. Many compositions on Lord Murugan and Lord Shiva are based on this raaga.

== Structure and Lakshana ==
Shanmukhapriya scale with shadjam at C

It is the 2nd rāgam in the 10th chakra Disi. The mnemonic name is Disi-Sri. The mnemonic phrase is sa ri gi mi pa dha ni. Its ārohaṇa-avarohaṇa structure (ascending and descending scale) is as follows (see swaras in Carnatic music for details on below notation and terms):

- ārohaṇa: S R₂ G₂ M₂ P D₁ N₂ Ṡ (Note: Alternate notations: Hindustani: S R G̱ M̄ P Ḏ Ṉ Ṡ; Western: C D E♭ F♯ G A♭ B♭ C)
- avarohaṇa: Ṡ N₂ D₁ P M₂ G₂ R₂ S (Note: Alternate notations: Hindustani: Ṡ Ṉ Ḏ P M̄ G̱ R S; Western: C B♭ A♭ G F♯ E♭ D C)

This scale uses the swaras chatushruti rishabham, sadharana gandharam, prati madhyamam, shuddha dhaivatam and kaisiki nishadam. As it is a melakarta rāgam, by definition it is a sampoorna rāgam (has all seven notes in ascending and descending scale). It is the prati madhyamam equivalent of Natabhairavi, which is the 20th melakarta scale.
