= Mohanam =

Janya raga of Carnatic music

- Arohanam: S R₂ G₃ P D₂ Ṡ
- Avarohanam: Ṡ D₂ P G₃ R₂ S
- Equivalent: Bhupali (Hindustani); Major pentatonic scale (Western)

Mohanam is a raga in Carnatic music (musical scale of South Indian classical music). It is an audava rāga (or owdava rāga, meaning pentatonic scale). It is usually described as a janya rāga of Harikamboji (28th Melakartha Raga). However, alternate opinions suggest that Mechakalyani or even Shankarabharanam may be a more appropriate classification based on the lakshana of the raga.

The equivalent of Mohanam in Hindustani music is Bhoop (or Bhopali).

It is one of the most common pentatonic scales across the world and is very popular in East Asian and Southeast Asian music, including China and Japan.

== Structure and Lakshana ==
Mohanam scale with shadjam at C

Mohanam is a symmetric rāga that does not contain madhyamam and nishādham. It is a symmetric pentatonic scale (audava-audava raga in Carnatic music classification – audava meaning 'of 5'). Its ārohaṇa-avarohaṇa structure (ascending and descending scale) is as follows (see swaras in Carnatic music for details on below notation and terms):

- ārohaṇa : S R₂ G₃ P D₂ Ṡ (Note: Alternate notations: Hindustani: S R G P D Ṡ; Western: C D E G A C)
- avarohaṇa : Ṡ D₂ P G₃ R₂ S (Note: Alternate notations: Hindustani: Ṡ D P G R S; Western: C A G E D C)

(the notes used in this scale are shadjam, chathusruthi rishabham, antara gandharam, panchamam, chathusruthi dhaivatham)

Mohanam is usually classified as a janya rāga of Harikambhoji, the 28th Melakarta rāga, or as a janya raga of Kalyani based on its lakshana. The Hindustani equivalent Bhoop is associated with Kalyan thaat (the equivalent of Kalyani alias Mechakalyani).

One of the first scales employed by the ancient Tamils was the Mullaippann (3 BCE), a pentatonic scale composed of the notes sa ri ga pa da equivalent to C, D, E, G, and A in the western notations. These fully harmonic scales, constitutes the raga Mohanam in the Carnatic music style.
