= Lal Salam (TV series) =

Television series

- Title logo
- Genre: Talk show
- Directed by: Vinod Thazhavana
- Presented by: Mohanlal; Meera Nandan
- Theme music composer: Rahul Raj
- Opening theme: Lal Salam
- Ending theme: Swantham Lalettan...
- Composer: Stephen Devassy
- Country of origin: India
- Original language: Malayalam
- No. of seasons: 1
- No. of episodes: 22

Production
- Producer: Amrita TV
- Production locations: Thiruvananthapuram, Kerala
- Cinematography: Anurag Dhingra
- Camera setup: Multi-camera
- Running time: 55 minutes

Original release
- Network: Amrita TV
- Release: 18 August 2017 – 28 January 2018

Lal Salam is an Indian entertainment talk show hosted by actor Mohanlal on Amrita TV. The show is themed around Mohanlal's film career, it also introduces and honours humanitarians and social workers, and has other interactive and performance segments. It is the first television presentation by Mohanlal, hosted alongside Meera Nandan. The show premiered on Amrita TV on 18 August 2017, it telecast every Saturday and Sunday at 8:00 PM IST.

== Concept ==
Lal Salam has different segments – each episode is dedicated to a renowned film of Mohanlal. Co-actors, producers, directors and other colleagues who have associated with Mohanlal in the film come to a single platform to discuss various aspects of the film such as their experience working with Mohanlal, the hard work and effort that went into the making of these films and the fun and lighter moments on the sets during the shoot of the film. The audience gets to witness these funny interactions between the actor and his colleagues.

The show also has a segment where an ardent fan of actor Mohanlal will be given an opportunity to meet him in person on the channel's platform. Another major segment of the show honours social workers, uniformed men and other people who have done humanitarian deeds or selfless acts of service. Such personalities are invited to the show, introduced to the audience and Lal meets and honours them on stage.

Lal Salam includes music, dance and other special performance by each guest artiste who presents his/her work.

== List of episodes ==
Episode No.	Film	Guest(s)	Special performance	Original air date
1	Aaraam Thampuran	Manju Warrier; Shaji Kailas; T. P. Madhavan; Suresh Kumar; Akshara Kishor; Baby Meenakshi; Surabhi Lakshmi	K. S. Chithra	18 August 2017
2	Aye Auto	Rekha; Maniyanpilla Raju; Ashokan; Kunchan	Neha Saxena	19 August 2017
3	Keerthi Chakra	Major Ravi; Jiiva; Lakshmi Gopalaswamy; Shweta Menon; Ramesh Pisharody	Neha Saxena	25 August 2017
4	Spadikam	K. P. A. C. Lalitha; Nedumudi Venu; Spadikam George; Badhran	Neha Saxena	26 August 2017
5	Bharatham	Nedumudi Venu; Sibi Malayil; Kaviyoor Ponnamma	Asha Sarath	
6	Velipadinte Pusthakam	Jayasurya; Lal Jose; Anna Rajan; Antony Perumbavoor; Benny P. Nayarambalam	Swasika; Ambili Devi; Mridula Vijay; Amrutha; Pratheeksha; Lekshmi Priya; Sangeetha; Parvathy Krishna; Amala Rose Kurian; Varada	
7	Paadha Mudra	R. Sukumaran; Seema; Jagadish; Roshni	Namboothiri; Vidyadharan	
8	Spirit	Ranjith; Shankar Ramakrishnan; Nandu; Tini Tom; Rafeeq Ahmed; Madhu		
9	Varnapakittu	I. V. Sasi; Meena; Jagadish; Babu Janardhanan	Roma Asrani	22 September 2017
10	Pingami	Sathyan Anthikkad; Janardhanan; Shanthi Krishna	Sangeetha	23 September 2017
11	Vanaprastham	Shaji N. Karun; Kukku Parameshwaram; Bindu Panicker; Kalamandalam Gopi; P. V. Maneesh	Kadhakali	30 September 2017
12	Drishyam	Meena; Jeethu Joseph; Esther Anil; Asha Sarath; Ansiba Hassan	Najim Arshad	6 October 2017
13	Irupatham Noottandu	P. Jayachandran; K. Madhu; Ambika; S. N. Swamy; Santhosh; Jose		
14	Yuvajanotsavam	Sreekumaran Thampi; Urvashi; Krishnachandran; Janardhanan		
15	Yoddha	M. G. Sreekumar; Sangeeth Sivan; Urvashi; Beena Antony	Paris Laxmi	19 November 2017
16	Shikkar	M. Padmakumar, S. Suresh Baby, Ananya, Kailash	Paris Laxmi	6 December 2017
17	Madampi	Ashokumar, B. Unnikrishnan	Roma Asrani	12 December 2017
18	Vietnam Colony	Lal, Vijaya Rangaraju, Bheeman Raghu		18 December 2017
19	Balettan	V. M. Vinu, Devayani, Nedumudi Venu		27 December 2017
20	Pulimurugan	Tomichan Mulakuppadam, Kamalinee Mukherjee, Vinu Mohan, Bala, M. R. Gopakumar	Vidhu Prathap, Sangeetha	9 January 2018
21	Ividam Swargamanu	Rosshan Andrrews, Priyanka Nair, Lakshmi Gopalaswamy		19 January 2018
22	Thanmathra	Meera Vasudevan, Blessy		21 January 2018
