= Paris Laxmi =

French dancer

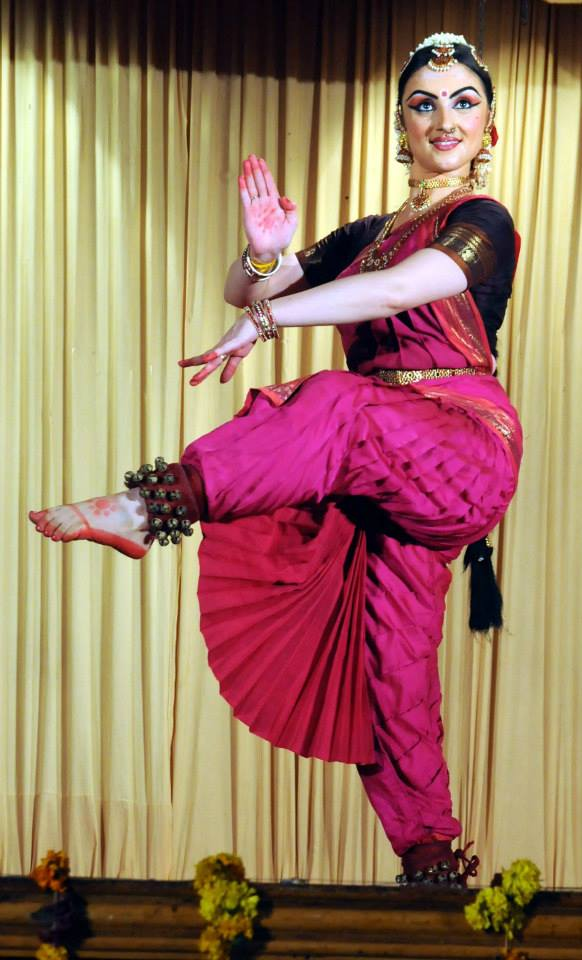
- Born: Myriam Sophia Lakshmi Quinio; 16 July 1991 (age 35); Aix-en-Provence, France
- Occupations: Dancer, actress
- Spouse: Pallippuram Sunil (m. 2012)

Myriam Sophia Lakshmi Quinio (born 16 July 1991), known professionally as Paris Laxmi is a dancer and actress born in France and settled in Kerala, India. With her husband Kathakali dancer Pallippuram Sunil, she runs the Kalashakti School of Arts in Vaikom, Kerala.

== Biography ==
Paris Laxmi was born in Aix-en-Provence, France to Yves Quinio, a drama artist and poet and Patricia Quinio, a sculptor. Her younger brother Theo Elie Narayan, is a drummer in classical orchestra drums as well as Indian drums like Tabla and Mridangam. He trained under Mridangam Maestro Thiruvarur Bakthavathsalam, who gave his sister her stage name: 'Paris Laxmi'. Laxmi expressed her desire to dance even before she walked and never lost the passion for it. She visited India with her family annually since the age of 5. Due to their parents' attraction to India, Laxmi and her brother received a bi-cultural education, between France and India.

In France, she started training in Bharatanatyam with Armelle Choquard (disciple of V. S. Muthuswami Pillai and Sucheta Chapekar) from the age of 9 and later from Dominique Delorme (disciple of V. S. Muthuswami Pillai and Padma Subrahmanyam). She also trained under Sucheta Chapekar in Pune and at Dr. Padma Subrahmanyam's Nrithyodaya School of Dance in Chennai.

On September 14, 2012, at Vaikom Mahadeva temple, she married Pallippuram Sunil, Kathakali dancer from Kerala. Together they created in 2012 the Kalashakthi School Of Arts and inaugurated a theatre cum-class-room, the Kalashakthi Mandapam in 2014 in Vaikom, Kerala where they both teach their respective dance forms and organise Art performances and workshops.

Paris Laxmi made her debut in Amal Neerad's Big B and then gained attention by her role in Anjali Menon's Bangalore Days as Kuttan's Michelle.

== Dance career ==
Paris Laxmi has been trained in various dance styles: Ballet, Jazz, Contemporary, Flamenco and Hip-hop from the age of five; and Bharatanatyam from the age of nine.

Laxmi is an active and well-known dancer who has performed throughout India and abroad as a Bharatanatyam soloist and with her husband Pallippuram Sunil.

Sunil and Laxmi created the duet 'Sangamam' in 2012 and in 2015 their first creation, Krishna Mayam, a classical dance fusion of Kathakali and Bharatanatyam showcasing stories and manifestations of Lord Krishna with compositions from the Kathakali and Bharatanatyam repertoires. 'Sangamam - Krishna Mayam' has toured all over India, Gulf countries and Europe since 2015 for various temples, theatres, associations and festivals like Soorya Festival.

Laxmi has also presented a Contemporary dance creation called 'Seasons on Earth' in 2016 at Kalashakti Mandapam in Vaikom and the Kerala Museum in Kochi; and a Flamenco dance creation in 2017 at Kalashakti Mandapam and Kala Ghoda Festival, Mumbai.

== Filmography ==
=== Films ===
- Note: All works are in Malayalam, unless otherwise noted.

Year	Title	Role	Notes
2007	Big B	Dancer in the song "Oh January"	Cameo appearance
2014	Bangalore Days	Michelle	Debut
2015	Salt Mango Tree	Angela	
2016	Bangalore Naatkal	Michelle	Tamil remake of Bangalore Days
2016	Olappeeppi	Unni's wife	
2017	Tiyaan	Elen Richard	
2017	Naval Enna Jewel		
2018	Rahasya	Rama	Theatre
2020	Kalamandalam Hyderali	Hafsa	
2026	Bachelor Party D'eux	Nalini	

=== Television ===
Year	Program	Character	Channel	Notes
2017	Manchester Vazhi Manjadimukku Vare	Catherine	Asianet	Telefilm
2017-2018	Dare the fear	Contestant	Asianet	Winner
2017	Lal Salam	Theme Dancer	Amrita TV	Talk Show
2018	Onnum Onnum Moonu	Arjuna in duet 'Krishna Mayam'	Mazhavil Manorama	Talk show
2019	Mahaguru	Laxmi	Kaumudy TV	TV Serial
2019	D5 Juniors	Judge	Mazhavil Manorama	Reality show
2020	Comedy stars season 2	Judge	Asianet	Reality show
2021	Star Singer	Performer	Asianet	Reality show
2021	Comedy stars Season 2	Performer	Asianet	Reality show
2021	Onam Ruchi Melam	Cook	Asianet	
2022	Seethapennu	Dancer Lakshmi	Flowers TV	TV series
2022 - 2023	Dancing Stars	Contestant	Asianet	Reality show
