= Kalamandalam Hyderali (film) =

Indian Malayalam-language drama film

- Official poster
- Directed by: Kiran G.Nath
- Written by: Dr.Aju K.Narayanan
- Produced by: Vedhas creations LLP
- Starring: Renji Panicker; T.G. Ravi; Ashokan; Paris Laxmi
- Cinematography: M. J. Radhakrishnan
- Edited by: Midhun Murali
- Music by: Kottakkal Madhu
- Production company: chitranjali studio
- Distributed by: Vedhas Creatios LLP
- Release date: 10 January 2020
- Country: India
- Language: Malayalam

Kalamandalam Hyderali is a 2020 Indian Malayalam-language drama film written by Dr.Aju K.Narayanan and directed by Kiran G.nath, starring Paris Laxmi, Renji Panicker, T.G. Ravi and Ashokan. The film is produced by vinesh Mohan under the production house Vedhas creations LLP. Music is composed by Kottakkal Madhu and Anil Gopalan cinematography is done by M. J. Radhakrishnan

== Cast ==
- Renji Panicker as Kalamandalam Hyderali
- Paris Laxmi as Hafsa
- T.G. Ravi as Moidooty
- Ashokan as Kalamandalam Sankaran Embranthiri
- Nikhil Renji Panicker as Young Kalamandalam Hyderali

== Production ==
The film took two years to complete including research and shoot. Shooting completed in three locations with five schedules and more than two hundred artists

== Music ==
Kalamandalam Hyderali film

Soundtrack album by Kottakkal Madhu and Anil gopalan
- Released: 16 November 2019
- Recorded: 2018–19
- Studio: Muzik Lounge, Chennai
- Genre: Feature film soundtrack
- Language: Malayalam
- Label: Millenium audios

Track list
No.	Title	Lyrics	Singer(s)	Length
1.	"Ravin Makkana"	M.T.Pradeep Kumar	Rakesh Bramanandan, Reshmi Vinesh	4:48
2.	"Ebthiha Manmanase"	Mal V.Madhvan Nir	Sreevalsan J.Menon	4:45
3.	"Kaunya Nidhe"	Kuchelavritham	Kottakkal Madu	4:41
