= Sandhya Purecha =

Bharatnatyam dancer

Dr. Sandhya Purecha
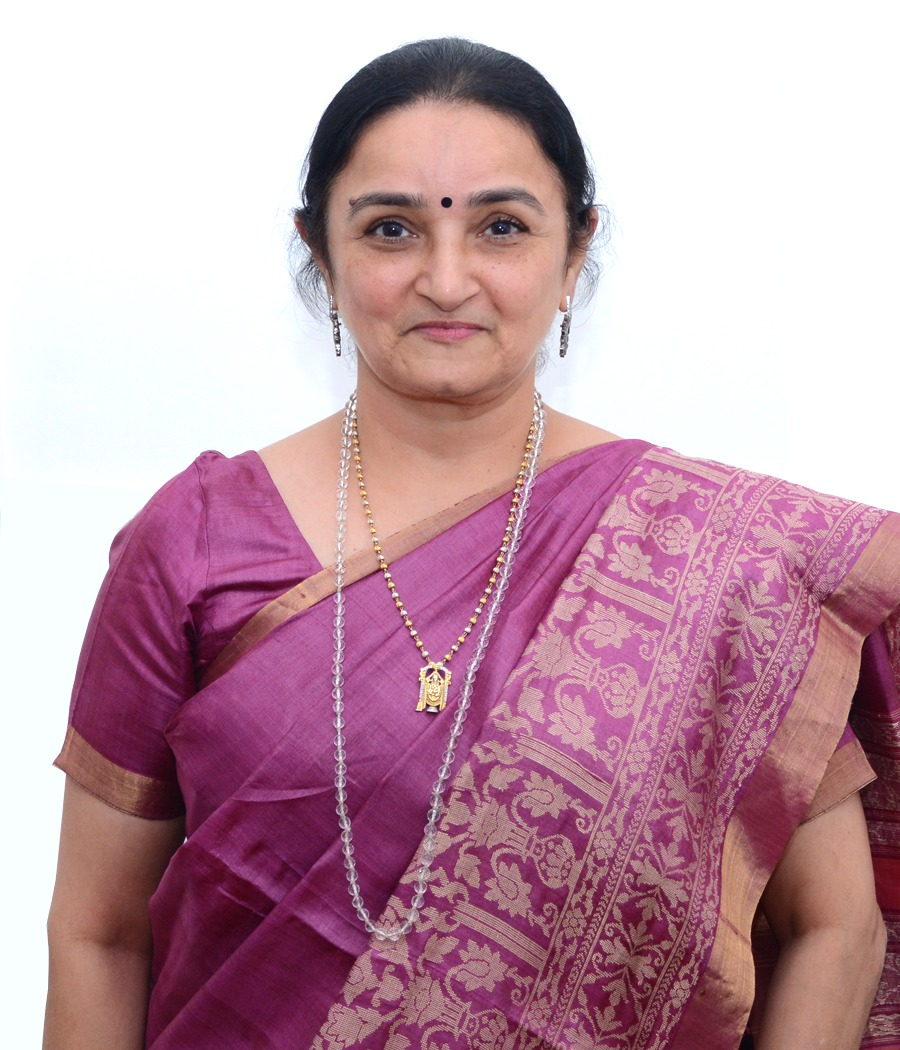
- Profile of Dr. Sandhya Purecha
- Born: Maharashtra
- Education: Ph.D. Dance
- Alma mater: University of Mumbai
- Known for: Indian Classical Dance form Bharatnatyam
- Notable work: research on Kalasa Karana 2010 Book – Natyashastra Vol I & II
- Awards: Sangeet Natak Akademi Award 2017, Maharastra State Cultural Award 2006
- Website: www.sandhyapurecha.com

Sandhya Purecha is a senior Bharatanatyam exponent, Author and renowned practitioner of Indian classical dance. She is the first person to bring on stage the performance in Bharatnatyam style of the entire Abhinaya Darpan dance treatise as defined by Nandikeshwara in Abhinaya Darpan and as choreographed by her Guru Parvati Kumar. Purecha has researched on Kalasa Karana and published it in 2010.

She was bestowed with Sangeet Natak Akademi Award for 2017 for Overall Contribution to Performing Arts.

Purecha is the Chairman of Sangeet Natak Akademi and Chairperson of W20 Engagement Group of G20 India 2023.

Sandhya Purecha is the member of Board of Trustees of Indira Gandhi National Centre for the Arts. She represents Government Teachers’ Training Programme at Natyashala on "Rasa" theory since 1994. She was member of prestigious indian padam awards committee 2023.

== Education ==
Purecha has a PHD (doctorate) in Natya Shastra. Her topic was Natyashastra Theory and Practice of Angikabhinaya in Bharatanatyam.

== Books ==
Dr. Sandhya Purecha is the renowned author of scholarly books on dance based on her profound research:

- Abhinayalakshanam - Manuscript on Karanas from Natyshastra translated into English, Hindi and Marathi with critical notes Vol. I
- Translation of Bharata's Natyashastra (languages: Marathi and Gujarati) Research Commission & Publisher: Ashtadashi Project of Central Sanskrit University, New Delhi, 2025
- Natyashastra Vol II - Marathi translation of the treatise with Padadccheda and Anvaya; Publisher: Maharashtra Rajya Sahitya and Sanskruti Mandal, Govt. of Maharashtra, Mumbai 2022
- Natyashastra Vol I - Gujarati translation of the treatise with Padadccheda and Anvaya; Publisher: University Grantha Nirman Board, Govt. of Gujarat, Mumbai 2018
- Natyashastra Vol I - Marathi translation of the treatise with Padadccheda and Anvaya; Publisher: Maharashtra Rajya Sahitya and Sanskruti Mandal, Govt. of Maharashtra, Mumbai 2016
- “Prerana” – An Anthology of Articles Penned by Dr. Sandhya Purecha; Publisher: Kavikulaguru Kalidas Sanskrit University, Ramtek, Nagpur Silver Jubilee Celebration Issue, 2022
- “Kalasa Karanas & Sthanaka-Mandala Bheda” from Kumbharaja's Nritya Ratna Kosh; Publisher: BhartiyaVidyaBhavan, Mumbai 2010
- “Acharya Parvatikumar – Nrityaditya” A Compilation of Life-Sketches of Acharya Parvatikumar Publisher: Sarfojiraje Bhosale Centre's Publication House, Mumbai 2010
- “Nrityawishkara”; Publisher: Sarfojiraje Bhosale Centre's Publication House, Mumbai 2009
- “Nrityadhyaya of Sangita Darpanam of Chatura Damodara”; Publisher: Sarfojiraje Bhosale Centre's Publication House, Mumbai 2008
- “Theory & Practice of Angikabhinaya” in Bharatanatyam; Publisher: Bharatiya Vidya Bhavan, Mumbai 2003
- Translation of Chapter 7 – Nrityadhyaya of Chatura Damodara's Sangita Darpanam, Acharya Parvati Kumar
- Kalasa Karana 2010

== Presidential Award and Sate Awards ==
Dr. Sandhya Purecha has been presented with numerous awards of appreciation and honors for her constant efforts towards classical dance and her lifetime devotion in the field of arts. List of a few of her distinctive honours:

- In 2024 “Kalidas Samman Puraskar” by Govt. of Madhya Pradesh
- In 2019 “Academic Excellence Award” presented to Bharata College of Fine Arts & Culture under the Principalship and guidance of Dr. Sandhya Purecha by the Kavikulaguru Kalidas Sanskrit University-Ramtek- Nagpur
- In 2017 Conferred with “SANGEET NATAK AKADEMI Award” for Overall Contribution in the Field of Dance by Sangeet Natak Akademi, Ministry of Culture, New Delhi
- In 2016 “Hirkani Award” by Doordarshan Kendra - Mumbai, Govt. of Maharashtra
- In 2013 “Maharashtra Rajya Mahakavi Kalidas Sanskrit Sadhana Puraskar” by Department of Higher & Technical Education, Govt. of Maharashtra
- In 2007 “Gujarat Gaurav Puraskar” by Gujarat Sangeet Natak Academy, Govt. of Gujarat
- In 2006 “Maharashtra State Cultural Award” by Department of Culture, Govt. of Maharashtra
- In 1977 “Best Child Actress Award” in Hindi Play by Department of Culture, Govt. of Maharashtra

== Other awards and honors ==
- In 2025 “Girvan Bhushan” Title by International Conference of Women Scholars, Delhi
- In 2025 “Certificate of Excellence by Global Book of Excellence - England”
- In 2024 “Kutch Ratna Award” by Kutchi Shakti Samaj on their 45th anniversary.
- In 2024 “Life-time Achievement Girnar Award” by the Bruhad Mumbai Gujarati Samaj
- In 2017 “Artistry Award” by Musicians Federation of India & CRPRM
- In 2015 “Newsmakers Achiever’s Award for Best Bharatanatyam Dancer” by NBC, Mumbai
- In 2014 “Pillar of the Hindustani Society” by TACCI, Mumbai
- In 2012 “Nritya Samahita Award” by R.K. Dance Theatre inc., National Arts Council of South Africa, ICCR
- In 2011 “Sharangdeva Samaroha” by MAHAGAMI, Aurangabad
- In 2011 “Life-time Achievement Award” by Amruta Foundation, Mumbai
- In 2011 “Life-time Achievement Award” by Rotary Club of Mumbai South, Mumbai
- In 2010 “The Artscape Nritya Ratna Award” by NBC, Mumbai
- In 2008 “Maharashtra Majha Award” Mumbai
- In 2006 “Dr. Babasaheb Ambedkar Award” by Buddha Dhamma 2550th year Celebration committee
- In 2005 “Eminent Bharata Natyam Artist” by Kala Gurjari, Mumbai
- In 2005 “Nritya Nivedita Title” by Akhil Bharatiya Sanskriti Sangh, Pune
- In 2003 “Lifetime Devotion in the field of Art” by SCZCC & Baroda Municipal Corporation
- In 1998 “Dedication in the field of Art” by Triveni Institute, Baroda
- In 1997 “Bharat Natyam Artist” by Kala Gurjari, Mumbai

== Performances ==
Dr. Sandhya Purecha has to her credit over 5000 performances throughout her career spanning over four decades on a national and international platform. Her choreographic expanse includes traditional solo and group ensembles, research-based productions, thematic dance ballets, jugalbandis and collaborative works, contemporary choreographies and many more..

- Mudra Dance Festival 2023
- Sanskriti Mahotsav 2017
- Elephanta Festival 2012 Organised by the Maharashtra Tourism Development Corporation (MTDC)
- Khajurao Festival – MP
- Bhojpur Festival – MP
- Shivratri Festival, Mansaur, MP
- Sanskrutik Utsav under “Azadi ka Amrut Mahotsav”, Udipi - SCZCC
- Nritya Sanrachana – Agartala, Sangeet Natak Akademi, Govt. of India
- Poetry Festival – Manipur, Sahitya Akademi, Govt. of India
- Simhastha Kumbha – Ujjain, Govt. of Madhya Pradesh
- Shakti Festival – Ujjain, Govt. of Madhya Pradesh
- Nadhaneerajanam – SVBC TTD, Tirupati
- Annual Natya Festival –Chennai
- 5th Margazhi Festival – Navi, Mumbai
- National Centre for Performing Arts, Mumbai
- Kalaghoda Arts Festival – Mumbai
- Elephanta Festival – Mumbai, Maharashtra
- KalidasMahotsav – Ujjain, Madhya Pradesh
- Khajurao Festival – Madhya Pradesh
- Mahalsadevi Festival – Goa
- Modhera Festival – Ahmedabad, Gujarat
- Taj Festival – Agra, Uttar Pradesh
- Kalaghoda Festival – Mumbai, Maharashtra
- Allaudin Khan Festival – Madhya Pradesh
- Natyanjali Festival – Chidambaram, Tanjavur and Kumbhakonan, Tamil Nadu
- Nrityolsavam – Vadodara
- Pimpri – Chinchwad Municipal Corporation Festival – Pimpri
- Shaniwarwada Dance & Music Festival - Pune
- Konark Festival – Orissa
- Ellora Festival – Aurangabad, Maharashtra
- Hampi Festival – Karnataka
- Anushriti Festival – Madhya Pradesh
- Gorakhpur Festival – Uttar Pradesh
- Vividh Kala Mahotsav – Maharashtra
- Jhansi Festival – Jhansi, Madhya Pradesh
- Bhojpur Mahotsav – Bhopal, Madhya Pradesh
- Sreechitra Festival – Kerala
- Mamallapuram Dance Festival – Tamil Nadu
- Pattadakal Dance Festival - ChalukyaUtsav – Karnataka
- Parampara Festival – New Delhi
- World Dance Alliance – Chennai, Tamil Nadu
- India Habitat Centre – New Delhi
- India International Centre – New Delhi
- IGNCA – New Delhi
- Dance Jathre – Banglore, Karnataka
- Nataraj Pandit Gopi Krishana Jayanti Mahotsav – Nashik, Maharashtra
- Mumbai Festival – Mumbai, Maharashtra
- Navi Mumbai Festival – Navi Mumbai, Maharashtra
- 2550 years Celebration of Buddha Centenary – Gateway of India, Mumbai
- Nehru Centre Classical Dance Festival – Mumbai, Maharashtra
- Lakshman Mela Festival – Lucknow, Uttar Pradesh
- Swami Haridas Sangeet Sammelan – Mumbai, Maharashtra
- Satara Uttar Chidambaram Festival – Satara, Maharashtra
- Surabhi Nritya Natya Sangeet Mahotsav – Amravati, Maharashtra
- Sharangadeva Mahotsav – Aurangabad, Maharashtra

=== International Performances ===
- Jawaharlal Nehru Cultural Centre of the Embassy of India, Moscow and the Glinka State Museum of Musical Culture.
- R. K. Dance Theatre’s Nritya Mahotsav 2012 at Pietermaritzburg, Pretoria and Johannesburg in association with: Indian Cultural Centre, Johannesburg, High Commission of India, Pretoria, International Relations & Cooperation, Department: Arts & Culture, Republic of South Africa & National Arts Council of South Africa
- Inauguration of Jain Temple – New York
- Nehru Centre – London
- Bhartiya Vidya Bhavan – London
- CORD/WDA/ICKL International Dance Conference – Taiwan
- Patidar Samaj – London
- Sargam Association – London
- Battery Dance Company – New York
- Milap Festival – Liverpool
- Millennium Bharatanatyam Celebration – Canada
- 7th Kala Nidhi International Dance Festival & Conference – Toronto
- Edinburgh Festival – Scotland
- International Youth Festival – Italy

== Choriography ==
- Chitrasutra – presentation based on Poetry, Painting, Music & Dance
- Rutuchakra – based on Puranik story of Madana Dahana
- Discovery Of India – based on Jawaharlal Nehru’s Bharat Ek Khoj
- Insaniyat ka Zakhira – based on Performing Arts and Humanity
- R3 – Classical & Contemporary dance based on Raga (Music) Rang (Colour) & Rasa (Dance) Therapy
- Classics Square – on four classical dance forms on Indo-western fusion
- Vedas – fashion show based on Indian culture
- Amar Mukti Aloye Aloye – on poetries of Rabindranath Tagore
- Jagat Parabarer Tire Shishura Kore Khela – on Rabindranath Tagore’s writings of Shishu, Gitanjali and Geetabitan
- Panchamahabhuta – based on the Five Elements Space, Water, Wind, Fire
