= Veerappu =

2007 film directed by Badri

- Title card
- Directed by: Badri
- Screenplay by: Badri
- Based on: Spadikam (1995) by Bhadran
- Produced by: Krishnamoorthy Vijayakumar; Sujatha Vijayakumar
- Starring: Sundar C Gopika; Prakash Raj
- Cinematography: K. S. Selvaraj
- Edited by: Mu. Kasi Vishwanathan
- Music by: D. Imman
- Production company: Home Media [P].Ltd
- Release date: 27 July 2007
- Running time: 140 minutes
- Country: India
- Language: Tamil

Veerappu (transl. Valiant) is a 2007 Indian Tamil-language action drama film written and directed by Badri in his directorial debut. It is a remake of Malayalam film Spadikam (1995), but the core plot is drawn from the Malayalam film Narasimham (2000), both starring Mohanlal. The film stars Sundar C in the lead role, along with Gopika, Prakash Raj, Vivek, and Santhanam. The music was composed by D. Imman, while cinematography and editing was done by K. S. Selvaraj and Mu. Kasi Vishwanathan, respectively.

== Plot ==
Veerappu is all about the relationship between a strict father Vedhukannu and his rogue son Pulippandi who wants his son to become a brilliant mathematician.

== Cast ==
- Sundar C as Pulippandi
  - Master Udayaraj as young Pulippandi
- Gopika as Bharathi
- Prakash Raj as Vedhukannu, Puli's father
- Vivek as Ratthan
- Santhanam as Puli's friend
- Supreeth as Thilla
- Anju as Kodi
- Tejashree
- Sumithra as Gandhimathi, Puli's mother
- Santhoshi as Puli's sister
- Ponnambalam as Gowripet Shankar
- Delhi Kumar as Puli's uncle
- Prem as Puli's brother-in-law
- Lollu Sabha Maaran as Mokkai
- Shobaraj as Katturaja, corrupt inspector
- Vichu Vishwanath as Katturaja's Assistant
- Seshu as Kodai Idi Kumar
- Balu Anand as Police Inspector

== Production ==
The scene where Sundar gets arrested and paraded through streets was shot at Tirunelveli.

== Soundtrack ==
The soundtrack was composed by D. Imman.

All lyrics are written by K. S. Selvaraj.

Track listing
No.	Title	Singer(s)	Length
1.	"Puliya Kili Jeyicha"	Harish Raghavendra, Madhushree	04:54
2.	"Roundukatti Adi"	Bhargavi	04:37
3.	"Poona Varuveero"	Janani Madhan (Jey)	05:39
4.	"Mathematical Expression (Kanakku)"	Manikka Vinayagam	04:06
5.	"Poona Varuveero" (Remix)	D. Imman, Janani Madhan	05:27
Total length:			24:43

== Critical reception ==
Sify wrote "On the whole Veerappu, is a clean family entertainer with a nice message, worth a look." T S V Hari of Rediff.com wrote "The yarn has been 'commercially treated' to suit Tamil sensibilities one would be led to believe. Save for the fast paced moments towards the climax and the punctuations of stunt scenes, the result is slow and too pat." Anamika of Kalki praised the acting of Sundar and Prakash Raj, Kasi Viswanathan's editing and Badri's dialogues but panned Imman's songs and Selvaraj's cinematography and climax looking forced. Malini Mannath of Chennai Online wrote, "It's an unpretentious, fairly engaging entertainer, with a racy narrative style and not many lagging moments".
