= Yuvathurki =

- Poster
- Directed by: Bhadran
- Written by: Bhadran
- Dialogues by: Rajendra Babu
- Produced by: G. P. Vijayakumar
- Starring: Suresh Gopi; Vijayashanti; Mani C. Kappan; Sukumari; Ratheesh; Rajan P. Dev; Geetha
- Cinematography: S. Kumar
- Edited by: N. P. Sathish
- Music by: S. P. Venkatesh
- Production companies: Seven Arts Productions; Amitabh Bachchan Corporation
- Distributed by: Bhavachitra Release
- Release date: 19 August 1996
- Country: India
- Language: Malayalam

Yuvathurki (transl. Young Turk) is a 1996 Malayalam-language action film directed by Bhadran, and produced by Amitabh Bachchan Corporation in association with Seven Arts. Suresh Gopi and Vijayashanti appear in the leading roles. Dr. Rajendra Babu was the dialogue writer for the film, who had earlier done Sphadikam, which was also directed by Bhadran, while Bhadran himself penned the screenplay.

Most of the film was shot in and around Delhi, barring a few scenes. The Tapovanam of Swami Somendra was shot at Udaipur. Yuvathurki was the first Malayalam film by Vijayashanti. Although movie had a star cast and high budget for a movie in the 90s, the film fared poorly at the box office.

== Plot ==
Sidhardha, a Delhi-based youth wing leader of the ruling party is sentenced to jail for murdering Ambikaratnam, a woman leader of the ruling party. At Tihar jail, he is made to face severe physical torture for questioning the injustice happening inside. Kalimulla, the jail superintendent, along with his henchmen is running a crime syndicate inside the jail. Siddhardha witnesses the brutal atrocities that poor criminals have to face while hardcore criminals with political connections enjoy special treatment. Upon the instruction from supreme court, a re-investigation is ordered on the Ambikaratnam murder case. Akhila, a dashing and aggressive officer from CBI is assigned to re-probe Sidhardha's case. She visits Siddhardha, who is hostile. Sidhardha refuses to co-operate with her, claiming that the entire the system is corrupt and has no faith left in him towards police. But Akhila moves ahead with her investigation and finds the innocence of Sidhardha. Justice Varma, a retired Supreme Court judge is working on a book which he claims will reveal the black realities of bureaucracy and politics in Delhi. Titled as "The Bleeding Nation", the book has chapters on the illegal underworld connections of Jyothikrishna, the aspiring Prime Minister of the country. Popularly known as J. K., he had been involved in several dubious defense deals that may even hurt the security of the country. J. K. Along with Dharman, his lieutenant, approach Justice Varma and offers several sops including a governor post, but Varma refuses to buy it. Sidhardha escapes from jail and reaches Varma to explain the realities happening inside central prison. He refuses to accept Varma's advice to surrender and informs him about the plan to avenge all who had framed him in the murder case. Sidhardha meets Akhila to explain his side. Sidhardha, an emerging youth leader, was involved in a series of public issues. He was accompanied by Dharman, Ambikaratnam and many other young politicians who desired to bring a change in the country. Sidhardha and Ambikaratnam questioned the policies of the party and opposed the ways of J. K. calling him a threat to the nation. In order to obliterate Sidhardha, J. K. took the help of Dharman, a shrewd politician. With the help of him, J. K. planted a bomb which exploded at the birthday party of Ambikaratnam, killing her. Sidhardha was accused by Dharman of murdering her and was arrested. Dharman rose in the party in a short time and has become a trusted aide of J. K. Meanwhile, Swami Somendra of Tapovan Ashram plans a conspiracy to topple the government. He is the mentor of J. K. and runs an underworld with his Ashram as base. Several politicians who questioned J. K. were found missing in little time and Akhila's investigation moves in this direction. In a short time, she is shocked to find that even the top CBI officers are a part of J. K.'s coterie. Swami Somendra tries all ways to influence Akhila, but all in vain. Sidhardha along with young Turks in the party decides to opt for violence to save the nation before the elections. They open up a secret jail, pick up several criminals and political leaders and kill them, creating a panic among the ruling class. He reaches out J. K. and Somendra and makes them confess of the crimes and kills them, whereby delivering justice.

== Cast ==
- Suresh Gopi as Sidhartha
- Vijayashanti as Akhila / Iron Butterfly ( Voice Over By Bhagyalakshmi)
- Mani C. Kappan as J. K.
- Ratheesh as Dharman
- Geetha as Ambika Ratnam
- Sukumari as Sidhartha's Mother
- Vimal Raj as Gurucharan Singh Kobra
- Rajan P. Dev as Somedraji/Gunashekharan
- Thilakan as Justice T. N. Sharma
- Kitty as Jayapal
- Abu Salim as Jackson
- Mohan Raj as Karimullah
- Spadikam George as SI Paasha
- Suresh Krishna
- Chali Pala
- Vallathol Unnikrishnan
- Shiju

== Release ==
Despite a huge star cast and a huge budget, Yuvathurki failed to create expected results at theatres. It was above average in Kerala but turned out to be a blockbuster in Telugu beating many Telugu movies that year and was a super hit in Tamil. Though made stylishly using high-end technology and cinematography, critics felt the movie had extreme violence and a highly complex way of narration, which the ordinary film viewer failed to understand. However, the film, after being broadcast frequently on television, also found a huge number of fans among the new generation; ten years after theatrical release. It was also the highest grosser in the opening week for a Malayalam movie due to heavy rush across South India. The movie also managed simultaneous release in Malayalam, Tamil, Hindi and Telugu, a rare feat during those times. It was produced by Seven Arts & Amitabh Bachchan Corporation. The film was dubbed and released in Tamil as Delhi Diary by S. Thanu.
