= Iyer the Great =

1990 film directed by Bhadran

- Promotional poster
- Directed by: Bhadran
- Written by: Bhadran (Story) Malayattoor Ramakrishnan (Screenplay & Dialogues)
- Produced by: Ratheesh; R. Mohan
- Starring: Mammootty; Geetha; Shobana; Sukumari; Devan
- Cinematography: Anandakuttan
- Edited by: M.S.Mani
- Music by: M. S. Viswanathan
- Production company: GoodKnight Films
- Release date: 31 August 1990 (India)
- Running time: 123 minutes
- Country: India
- Language: Malayalam

Iyer the Great is a 1990 Indian Malayalam-language fantasy psychological thriller film directed by Bhadran, starring Mammootty, Geetha, Shobana, Sukumari, and Devan. It was a commercial success upon release. M. S. Mani won the National Film Award for Best Editing for his work in the film.

== Plot ==
Vaikundam Soorya Narayana Iyer, a business executive, leads a normal family life with Veni, his wife and his mother. After falling from a tree while trying to capture an escaped pet parrot, Iyer suddenly develops a fear of heights. This traumatic experience, however also give him powers of clairvoyance.

A couple of days later, he foresees a train crash with the precise train number and time of the incident. He warns the railway authorities but is ignored. The crash killed more than a hundred passengers. Then, Iyer foresees an airplane crash and informs the authorities about a future bombing on a flight in Delhi. Aided by the information, the disaster is prevented, causing Iyer to hit the headlines.

Iyer gets an insight about steroids added to a particular brand of baby food by Gabrias Group. Iyer contacts Amala, a news reporter who does an exposé, destroying the business empire of Gabrias. Gabria vows vengeance on Iyer and plants a bomb in his car, killing Iyer's entire family. In retaliation, Iyer kills Gabrias but is shot and admitted to the hospital. At the hospital, he predicts the sun will set early at 3 p.m. on the upcoming 3rd. Amala realises that Iyer had just predicted his own death. The police impose tight security; however, a terrorist group successfully enters the hospital and shoots Iyer down at 3 p.m. The film ends showing Iyer's broken pair of glasses, with the caption The man who foresaw future.

== Cast ==
- Mammootty as Soorya Narayana Iyer
- Geetha as Veni
- Sukumari as Soorya's Mother
- Devan as Gabria
- Shobana as Amala
- Ratheesh as Police Officer Chellappan
- M.G. Soman as Dr. Jacob
- M. S. Thripunithura as Moorthy
- K. P. Ummer as G.D. Nair
- Ragini as Ammu
- Vijay Menon
- Pradeep Shakthi
- Rachana Prasad as Saudham
- Nisha Noor as Raji
- Kokila Gopinath as Dr Jacob's Wife

== Release ==
The film was released on 31 August 1990.

== Reception ==
The film received positive reviews from critics and audience. It was a commercial success and ran for a considerable period in Tamil Nadu too.
