= Badri (director) =

Indian film director and screenwriter

- Born: Badrinarayan Ranganathan
- Occupation: Film director Screenwriter
- Years active: 2007–present

Badri is an Indian film director and screenwriter who primarily works in Tamil film industry. He started his career with television series Malargal and made his debut in films with Veerappu in 2007.

== Career ==
Badri started his career by directing a television series such as Aadugiran Kannan and Malargal for Sun TV. He then shifted to cinema by working as an assistant to Sundar C and also made his directorial debut by directing him in Veerappu, remake of Malayalam film Spadikam. The film released in 2007 to mixed reviews, with one critic claiming that it is a "racy commercial entertainer" while another critic felt that it is not good as original. He again collaborated with Sundar C with Ainthaam Padai, film received negative reviews with critics accusing director for plagiarism by lifting scenes from Malayalam film Devasuram.

He then written and directed Thambikku Indha Ooru with Bharath, the film received negative reviews and became unsuccessful at box office. He wrote dialogues for Sundar C's directorial Kalakalappu.

Shiva and Vendhar Movies approached Badri to direct the remake of Rajinikanth starrer Thillu Mullu. Badri said that he ventured into Thillu Mullu with an open mind. "I wanted to make the storyline contemporary. Retaining the characters from the original, I wrote the script to suit today's generation". The film was launched on 24 August 2012 with a puja at the Image Auditorium at MRC Nagar in Chennai. Celebs included Karthi, Sneha, Prasanna, Meena, S. A. Chandrasekhar, Ambika, Vijay Antony, K. Balachander, Vaali and Dharani were present at the launch. The team after shooting in Chennai and Hyderabad headed to Dubai and Abu Dhabi to can a few songs and scenes. The songs Ragaangal Pathinaru was also shot in Dubai. The shooting was completed in March 2013. After wrapping up the shoot, Badri decided to shoot a music video of the 'Thillu Mullu' remix and convinced the M. S. Viswanathan to appear alongside Yuvan Shankar Raja in the iconic song. Prakash Raj played the character previously portrayed by Thengai Srinivasan. Director Badri stated "the challenge was to cast someone in Thengai Srinivasan's role. I couldn't think of anyone other than Prakash Raj". Kovai Sarala was selected to play Sowcar Janaki's role. Santhanam reprised the special guest appearance by Kamal Haasan.

Thillu Mullu received mixed critical response. M. Suganth of The Times of India gave 3.5/5 and said, "Much of the credit for this (film) should go to director Badri, whose script clearly suggests that some amount of thought has gone into reworking a cult classic for present-day audiences. Instead of going for a scene by scene remake, he manages to spin newer situations that make it very much a film of our times."

== Filmography ==
=== As director and screenwriter ===
Year	Film	Notes
2007	Veerappu	
2009	Aiyantham Padai	
2010	Thambikku Indha Ooru	
2013	Thillu Mullu	
2014	Aadama Jaichomada	
2020	Naanga Romba Busy	
2022	Pattampoochi	

=== As dialogue writer ===
Year	Film	Notes
2012	Kalakalappu	
2019	Action	
2025	Gangers	
