= Vajram (1995 film) =

- VCD cover
- Directed by: S. V. Krishna Reddy
- Written by: Diwakar Babu (dialogues)
- Screenplay by: S. V. Krishna Reddy
- Story by: Bhadran
- Based on: Spadikam (1995)
- Produced by: C. Gowtham Kumar Reddy
- Starring: Nagarjuna; Roja; Indraja
- Cinematography: Sarath
- Edited by: K. Ram Gopal Reddy
- Music by: S. V. Krishna Reddy
- Production company: Lakshmi Padmaja Enterprises
- Release date: 5 January 1996
- Running time: 125 minutes
- Country: India
- Language: Telugu

Vajram (transl. Diamond) is a 1996 Indian Telugu-language action drama film directed by S. V. Krishna Reddy and produced by C. Gowtham Kumar Reddy under the Lakshmi Padmaja Enterprises banner. It is a remake of the 1995 Malayalam film, Spadikam, directed by Bhadran. The film stars Nagarjuna, Roja, and Indraja. The music was composed by S. V. Krishna Reddy.

== Plot ==
Vajram is a story of young man, estranged from his narcissistic father, upon failing to meet the latter's high expectations for intellectual pursuits.

A school headmaster (K. Viswanath), is never happy with his son, Chakravarthy aka "Chakri" (Nagarjuna), and always degrades him. However, having had enough of him, Chakri runs away from home only to return as a gangster after long. What happens to him and his comeback effect to all forms the rest of the story.

== Cast ==
- Nagarjuna as Chakravarthy "Chakri"
- Roja as Kuali
- Indraja
- K. Viswanath as Chakri's father
- Gollapudi Maruthi Rao as G. M. Rao
- Giri Babu as Chakri's uncle
- Jard Andhoni
- Vallabhaneni Janardhan
- Chalapathi Rao as Police Officer
- Rami Reddy as Police Officer
- Brahmanandam as Brahmam
- Babu Mohan
- AVS as Brahmam's father-in-law
- Tanikella Bharani as Constable
- Mallikarjuna Rao
- Gundu Hanumantha Rao
- Ananth Babu as Chakri's assistant
- Sakshi Ranga Rao
- Subbaraya Sharma
- Jenny
- Sivaji Raja as Kota's henchman
- Raja Ravindra as Madhu
- Ashok Kumar as Doctor
- Sujatha as Chakri's mother
- Sri Lakshmi as Brahmam's mother-in-law
- Seetha as Chella
- Aleekhya
- Rajasri
- Swathi
- Sugandha
- Saakshi Siva as Chakri's friend
- Master Tarun as Young Chakri

== Soundtrack ==
Vajram

Film score by S. V. Krishna Reddy
- Released: 1995
- Genre: Soundtrack
- Length: 30:17
- Label: Supreme Music
- Producer: S. V. Krishna Reddy

S. V. Krishna Reddy chronology
Top Hero (1995)	Vajram (1995)	Vinodam (1996)

All music is composed by S. V. Krishna Reddy.

Track list
No.	Title	Lyrics	Singer(s)	Length
1.	"Kuyile Kuyile"	Sirivennela Seetharama Sastry	S. P. Balasubrahmanyam, K. S. Chithra, Swarnalatha	4:48
2.	"Gampalo Kodentha"	Bhuvana Chandra	S. P. Balasubrahmanyam, K. S. Chithra, Swarnalatha	5:21
3.	"Thaka Dhimi Thalamesi"	Jonnavittula Ramalingeswara Rao	S. P. Balasubrahmanyam, Swarnalatha	5:00
4.	"Manasa Yenduku Kanniru"	Sirivennela Seetharama Sastry	S. P. Balasubrahmanyam, Renuka, Srilatha	5:08
5.	"Avva Kaavala Buvva Kaavala"	Bhuvana Chandra	S. P. Balasubrahmanyam, Swarnalatha	4:39
6.	"Pellidu Kocchindhi Pilla"	Bhuvana Chandra	S. P. Balasubrahmanyam, Swarnalatha	5:01
Total length:				30:00
