= Shogun Films =

Film production company in India

Shogun Films (formerly GoodKnight Films) is an Indian film production company, which produces mainly Malayalam films. It is owned by R. Mohan (also known as GoodKnight Mohan). It has also produced Hindi films such as Gardish and Kabhi Na Kabhi, which established director Priyadarshan in Bollywood.

== Selected filmography ==
- Isabella
- Chakkikotha Chankaran
- Iyer the Great
- Njan Gandharvan
- Nayam Vyakthamakkunnu
- Kilukkam
- Maya Mayooram
- Gardish (Hindi)
- Sukham Sukhakaram
- Minnaram
- Spadikam
- Kaalapani
- Asuravamsam
- Kabhi Na Kabhi (Hindi)
- Krishnagudiyil Oru Pranayakalathu
- Aahaa..! (Tamil)
- Raja Ko Rani Se Pyar Ho Gaya (Hindi)
- Chandni Bar (Hindi)
- Vellithira
- Kochi Rajavu
- Gauri: The Unborn (Hindi)
- Ettum Gusthiyum
- Seedan (Tamil)
