= Changatham =

- Directed by: Bhadran
- Starring: Mammootty; Madhavi; Mohanlal; Jagathi Sreekumar; Paravoor Bharathan; Shankaradi; Captain Raju; Sathyakala
- Music by: Raveendran
- Release date: 25 December 1983
- Running time: 130 minutes
- Country: India
- Language: Malayalam

Changatham is a 1983 Indian Malayalam-language film, directed by Bhadran, starring Mammootty, Mohanlal, Madhavi, and Captain Raju.

== Plot ==
Annie works as a typist in Daniel's office and he has an eye on her. She is often followed by Tony, a wealthy businessman and he confesses his love for her. Finally Tony marries Annie, which irks Daniel. Soon life starts disturbing Annie as she finds out that Tony was actually cheating her as he is a conman. Tony explains her why he became a conman and of his past struggling life. In between Daniel gets killed by Tony as he tries to rape Annie. A Police officer Prem is appointed to investigate this case. Meanwhile, Annie understands Tony and his good intentions and finally starts supporting her husband in all his activities as a partner. The climax reveals whether they get caught for all the wrong deeds.

== Cast ==
- Mammootty as Dileep/Tony
- Mohanlal as S.T. Daniel
- Madhavi as Annie
- Jagathi Sreekumar as Sulfikker
- Paravoor Bharathan as Swamy
- Shankaradi
- Captain Raju as Police inspector
- Sathyakala as Usha

== Soundtrack ==
The music was composed by G. Devarajan and Raveendran and the lyrics were written by Puthiyankam Murali and Vayalar Ramavarma.

No.	Song	Singers	Lyrics	Length (m:ss)
1	"Eeran Peelikkannukalil"	K. J. Yesudas	Puthiyankam Murali	
2	"Gaagultha Malayil Ninnum" (Bit)	K. J. Yesudas, S. Janaki		
3	"Kayampoo" (Resung From Nadi)	K. J. Yesudas	Vayalar Ramavarma	
4	"Pradhamaraavin"	S. Janaki	Puthiyankam Murali	
5	"Vishama Vrithathil"	S. Janaki	Puthiyankam Murali	
