= Ainthaam Padai =

2009 film directed by Badri

- Poster
- Directed by: Badri
- Written by: Badri; Sakthi Krishna (dialogues)
- Produced by: Khushbu
- Starring: Sundar C Vivek; Nassar; Simran; Devayani; Mukesh
- Cinematography: D. Shankar
- Edited by: Kasi Viswanathan
- Music by: D. Imman
- Production company: Avni Cinemax
- Distributed by: Ayngaran International
- Release date: 24 July 2009
- Running time: 152 minutes
- Country: India
- Language: Tamil

Ainthaam Padai (transl. Fifth Creation / Fifth Army) is a 2009 Indian Tamil-language action drama film directed by Badri, starring Sundar C, Vivek, Nassar, Simran, Devayani and Mukesh. It was released on 24 July 2009, and produced by Sundar's wife, Khushbu.

== Plot ==
The film takes place in Tirunelveli. As the film moves ahead, it unravels about an enmity with another family where Devasena is a daughter. But Gunasekaran is kind enough in breaking the hardships and getting united by arranging nuptials for Devasena with his brother Karunakaran. Prabhakaran, another brother, is rude and misbehaves several times with Devasena. She vows to alienate him from his family by marrying Karunakaran.

Devasena does not consummate her marriage with Karunakaran and intends to take revenge on Prabhakaran. When she finds out that Prabhakaran and Gayathri are in love, she tries to make their love fail. For that she seeks the help of her uncle Dhanushkodi. Dhanushkodi kidnaps Gayathri's father and tries to force Gayathri to marry his last son. He makes her lie in her heartfelt consent to the engagement. Devasena is very happy to take revenge on Prabhakaran and challenges him.

Memories of the past are coming to Prabhakaran. A few years ago, Gunasekaran and his girlfriend Kalpana were engaged to be married. Meanwhile, Dhanushkodi and Rajadurai were selling illicit liquor in the town. Kalpana, who was then the women's team leader of the town, went with her group to stop the scam, and a fight broke out between Prabhakaran and Rajadurai. Thus, Dhanushkodi and his sons face great humiliation in the town. They agree to an order to leave the city as soon as possible.

Thus, enmity develops between the Dhanushkodi and Gunasekaran families. In particular, the idea arises for Rajadurai to take revenge on Kalpana somehow. The next day, the wedding arrangements of Gunasekaran and Kalpana take place at the temple as scheduled. Kalpana wears a garland and sits on the wedding stage, where Rajadurai comes in disguise. Kalpana sees that he has come with a thaali in his hand. While Kalpana is confused as to what is going on, Rajadurai tries to forcefully tie the thaali around Kalpana's neck without any delay. Before he finishes tie the knot, Kalpana pushes him away and runs away from him to the temple. Rajadurai beats up some people including Gunasekaran who came to stop him and chases Kalpana away. No matter how far Kalpana ran, Rajadurai caught her at the roadblock. When Kalpana begged Rajadurai not to, he forcibly tied Thaali around her neck. Shocked, Kalpana carries the thaali he has tied with her hands. In the ensuing battle, Rajadurai is killed by Prabhakaran in a defensive attempt. Seeing this, Kalpana is shocked and becomes affected with psychosis. Thus, Prabhakaran ends by telling Thanthoni about this past.

The rest of the film is about the hand-in-hand combat between Prabhakaran and Devasena, with each one moving around with their smart plans. Knowing the whole conspiracy behind Prabhakaran, he plans to thwart Devasena's plans with the help of Thanthoni without anyone knowing. Thanthoni disguises himself as a preacher and intimidates a minister into using him as a helper in this plan. Meanwhile, Kalpana, who was locked up in Dhanushkodi's house, regains consciousness due to a disturbance that took place there. Prabhakaran manages to rescue Gayathri's father safely from Dhanushkodi. After causing chaos in the wedding that was to take place there, Prabhakaran, who had somehow stood in front of Devasena, happily tied the thaali around Gayathri's neck with her satisfaction.

Dhanushkodi is angry with Devasena and tries to kill her and turn it into a suicide. Then Kalpana helps her. Gunasekaran, Karunakaran, and Prabhakaran together defeat them. Later that night, the couples – Prabhakaran and Gayathri; Gunasekaran and Kalpana; Karunakaran and Devasena; and Thanthoni and Diana – start happily celebrating their first night together.

== Cast ==
- Sundar C as Prabhakaran
- Vivek as Thanthoni
- Nassar as Gunasekaran
- Radha Ravi as Minister
- Simran as Devasena Karunakaran
- Devayani as Kalpana Gunasekaran
- Mukesh as Karunakaran
- Aditi Chowdhry as Gayathrie Prabhakaran
- Aarthi as Diana Thanthoni
- Doddanna as Dhanushkodi
- Raj Kapoor as Rajadurai
- Sai Prashanth as Dinakaran
- Madhan Bob as Devasena's father
- Sampath Raj as Periyasamy
- Aryan as Paneerselvam
- Vichu Vishwanath as Ennasi
- Besant Ravi as Dhanushkodi's henchman
- Minnale Ravi
- Suja as herself in an item number

== Soundtrack ==
The soundtrack was composed by D. Imman. It includes a remix of the song "Orampo", composed by Ilaiyaraaja for Ponnu Oorukku Pudhusu (1979). The song "Vaadi En Vaasapadi" is based on the Hindi pop song "Aana Meri Gully" by Palash Sen.

Track	Singer(s)	Lyrics
"Orampo"	Ranjith, M. L. R. Karthikeyan, Arjith	Gangai Amaran
"Aaradi Rakshasano"	Shreya Ghoshal, Shail Hada, Kumar Sanu	Na. Muthukumar
"Sokku Sundar"	Sonu Kakkar	Na. Muthukumar
"Vaadi En"	Devan	Na. Muthukumar
"Chinna Kolunthanare"	Sadhana Sargam	Na. Muthukumar

== Critical reception ==
Rediff.com wrote, "Aindham Padai never takes itself seriously. It is not meant to be one. It's got a lot of lewd jokes, double entendre, just plain irritating stunts, and songs guaranteed to titillate the front-benchers, but Simran is one of the reasons it works even halfway." The Hindu wrote "This could've been the season's heart-warming family drama with enough twists and turns to keep you hooked", but the film, "promoted as a mass entertainer, comes across as a mega television serial with too many sub-plots that take their own sweet time to come to a conclusion."
