= Venmani Haridas =

Kalamandalam Venmani Haridas
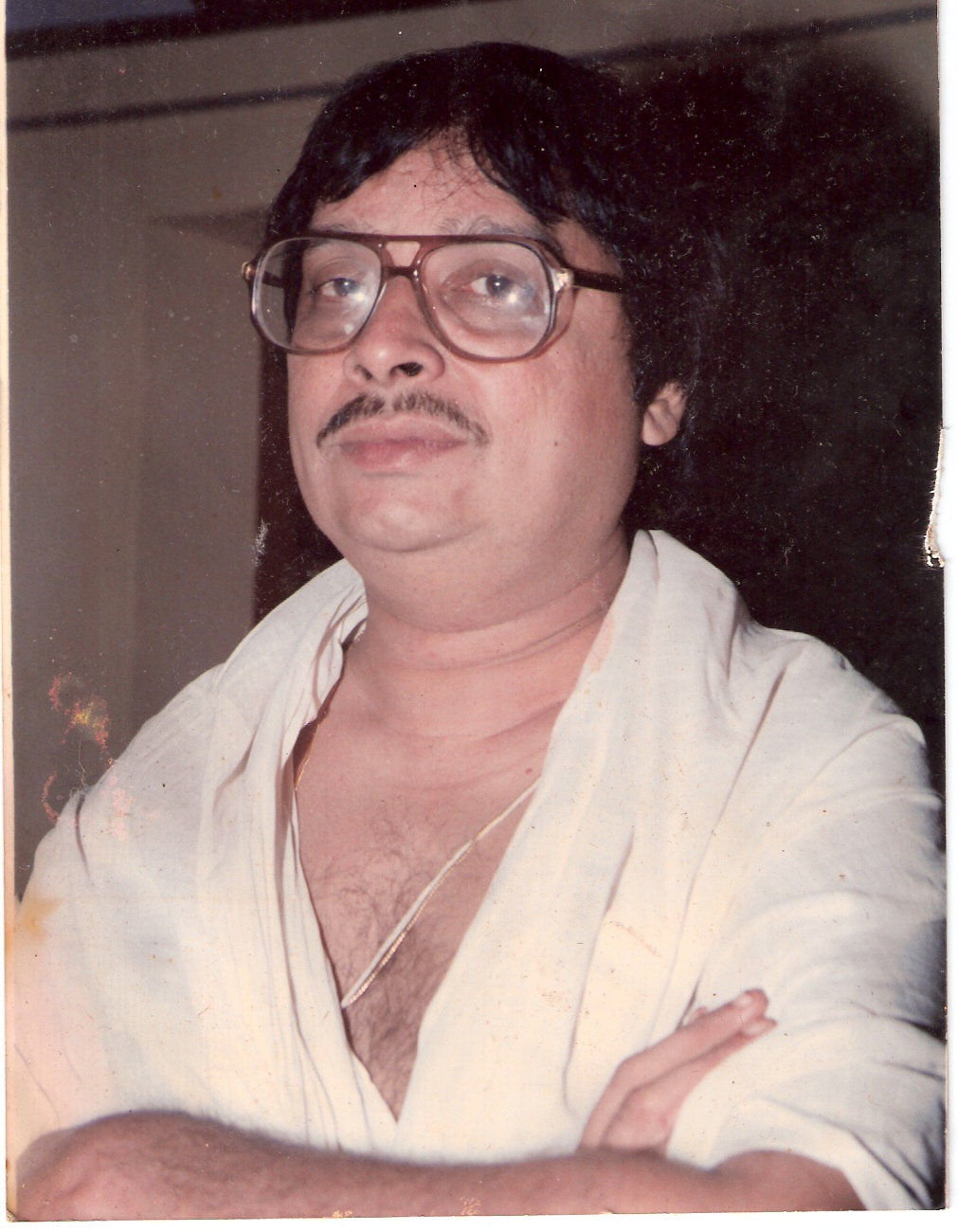
- Venmani Haridas

Background information
- Born: Haridas; 15 September 1946; India
- Died: 17 September 2005 (aged 59)
- Genre: Kathakali
- Occupation: Singer

Kalamandalam Venmani Haridas (15 September 1946 – 17 September 2005) was an Indian Kathakali musician known for his rendition of Kathakali padams (playback songs) in the classical dance-drama tradition of Kerala. He was born at Venmani Mana, a Namboodiri household with a literary background, in Vellarappilly village near Aluva, close to Kochi. Haridas developed an interest in Kathakali by watching performances staged at the nearby Akavoor Mana. He received his early training in music under Mundakkal Sankara Varrier and later learned Kathakali padams from stories such as Rukmini Swayamvaram and Kuchela Vritham.

== Early life ==
In 1960, he joined Kerala Kalamandalam and learned music under leading Kathakali musicians like Kalamandalam Neelakantan Nambisan, Sivaraman Nair and Kalamandalam Gangadharan Nair. He was the first student of Kalamandalam Gangadharan when the latter became a teacher in the institution. Haridas was known as a very talented student during his stay in Kalamandalam. Kalamandalam Sankaran Embranthiri, Madambi Subramanian Namboodiri, Kalamandalam Hyderali and Kalamandalam Subrahmanyan were immediate seniors to Haridas in the Kathakali Music section. In 1968, completing the course in Kalamandalam he joined Darpana, a noted performing arts institute set up by the famous danseuse Mrinalini Sarabhai in Ahmedabad, as a music teacher. This stint beyond the Vindhyas exposed him to various styles of north Indian renditions, including classical Hindustani music, which in later years will become a mounted musical backup for his innovations as a kathakali singer. A decade later, in 1978, Haridas fulfilled his ambition to get back to his home state for good when he was offered the post of music teacher at Margi in Thiruvananthapuram, where he subsequently worked for three decades.

== Education and later life ==
Haridas, on his return to the world of Kathakali, began as a shinkiti (ശിങ്കിടി - accompanist singer) on stage, primarily under star musician Embranthiri, who trained him. But eventually his voice, enunciation of lyrics and support from friends and senior colleagues like Hyderali helped him become the lead singer. He retained the Sopanam style of Kathakali music rendition even while infusing in it the voice culture of the south Indian classical Carnatic music. The most important fact, on analyzing his musical career is the importance he has given to the characterization in kathakali, the emotional quality and depth to the ´'vachikam´', as it is observed, to achieve this will be the most challenging for any future.

== Acting ==
Haridas has acted in two Malayalam feature films, Swaham and Vanaprastham. both directed by Shaji N. Karun & Bosco, Shayanam. He has also appeared in a few television serials like Neermathalam Poothakalam written by Kamala Surayya.

== Death ==
Haridas died of an acute liver problem in a hospital in Thiruvananthapuram.

== Family ==
Haridas is survived by his wife Saraswathi and two sons – actor Sarath Das and Harith.

== Work on Haridas ==
A biography of Haridas, titled Bhava Gayakan, has been published by Rainbow Books. Dr. N.P. Vijayakrishnan is the author. The 2012 documentary film 'Chitharanjini: Remembering the Maestro', is focused on the musical life of Haridas. Chitharanjini is a documentary film made on the musical life of the Kathakali of Venmani Haridas directed by Ratheesh.
