= Ente Mohangal Poovaninju =

- Promotional poster
- Directed by: Bhadran
- Written by: Bhadran
- Produced by: Baby Paul; Babu Paul; Boban Nadakkavil
- Starring: Shankar; Menaka; Mohanlal; Kalaranjini
- Cinematography: Melli Irani
- Edited by: G. Venkittaraman
- Music by: V. Dakshinamoorthy
- Production company: Beebees Combines
- Distributed by: Central Pictures
- Release date: 26 November 1982
- Running time: 130 min
- Country: India
- Language: Malayalam

Ente Mohangal Poovaninju (transl. My wishes bloomed) is a 1982 Indian Malayalam-language romance film written and directed by Bhadran (in his directorial debut), starring Shankar, Menaka and Mohanlal. The film features music composed by V. Dakshinamoorthy. The film was remade in Tamil as Isai Paadum Thendral.

== Plot ==
Prashant, a wealthy bachelor, grows tired of his wealth and moves to a village to start a new life as a commoner. There, he meets and falls in love with Sreedevi, a middle-class girl.

Prashant decides to marry Sreedevi, but his father finds out the truth and vehemently opposes the relationship, as he wants his son to marry Baby who belongs to a similarly wealthy family like his. Aided by his best friend Vinu, Prashant finally convinces his father to agree to the marriage, but disaster strikes on the day of the wedding as Baby, who was actually in love with Prashant, kills Sreedevi by mixing poison in her drink.

Several months later, a visibly distraught Prashant is being taken care of by Baby. Prashant's father sees this and arranges for Baby to be married to Prashant so that his son can find peace, a decision seconded by Vinu. However, on the night after their wedding, Prashant reveals to Baby that he had known for some time that it was Baby who poisoned Sreedevi and had mixed the same poison in the milk she had given him, thereby taking away the life with him she had so desperately wanted. The film ends with Prashant breathing his last with his memories of Sreedevi.

== Cast ==
- Shankar as Prasanth
- Menaka as Sreedevi
- Mohanlal as Vinu
- Kalaranjini as Baby
- K. P. Ummer
- Unni Mary as Nisha
- Adoor Bhasi as Eashwaran
- T. R. Omana
- Nedumudi Venu as Damu
- Alummoodan as Pappu
- J. V. Ramana Murthy
- Master Anto
- Master Roman
- Sukumaran Dalmia
- P. J. Thomas

== Soundtrack ==
The soundtrack was composed by V. Dakshinamoorthy. It also had two classical tracks picturised on Shankar.

Track	Song	Singer(s)	Lyrics
1	"Aashada Meghangal Nizhalukal Erinju"	K. J. Yesudas, S. Janaki	Puthiyankam Murali
2	"Chakkini Raaja" (Bit)	Balamurali Krishna, S. Janaki	
3	"Ksheera Saagara" (Traditional)	K. J. Yesudas	Muringoor Sankara Potti
4	"Love Two"	Vikram, Anita Chandrasekhar	Puthiyankam Murali
5	"Manasuloli Marmamunu Thelusuko"	K. J. Yesudas, S. Janaki	Tyagaraja
6	"Nananju Neriya Patturumaal"	K. J. Yesudas, S. Janaki	Bichu Thirumala
7	"Oro Pulariyum Enikku Vendi"	K. J. Yesudas	Bichu Thirumala
8	"Manasuna Neekai Maruthogo... Raghuvaranum"	Balamurali Krishna, K. J. Yesudas, S. Janaki	
9	"Tha Thai Thakita Thaka"	K. J. Yesudas	
10	"Thamburu Thaane Shruthi Meetti"	S. Janaki	Bichu Thirumala

== Release ==
The film was released on 26 November 1982.
