= Naval Enna Jewel =

2017 Indian film

- Theatrical release poster
- Directed by: Renjilal Damodaran
- Screenplay by: Renjilal Damodaran; V. K. Ajith Kumar
- Story by: Renjilal Damodaran
- Produced by: Renjilal Damodaran; Cyriac Mathew Alencheril
- Starring: Shweta Menon; Reem Kadem; Adil Hussain; Anu Sithara
- Cinematography: Jobi James
- Edited by: Vijayakumar
- Music by: M. Jayachandran (songs); Eddie Torres (score)
- Production company: Indusvalley Film Creations
- Distributed by: Silver Screen Movie Makers
- Release date: 18 August 2017
- Running time: 140 minutes
- Country: India
- Languages: Malayalam; English

Naval Enna Jewel (transl. Naval, the Jewel), titled Naval the Jewel in English, is a 2017 Indian drama film co-written, co-produced and directed by Renjilal Damodaran. It was simultaneously shot in Malayalam and English languages. The film revolves around the lives of a mother and daughter who are victims of Arabi kalyanam. The film stars Shweta Menon and Reem Kadem, alongside Adil Hussain, Anu Sithara, Alen Matters Cyriac Alencheril, Anjali Nair, Sudheer Karamana, Renny Johnson and Paris Laxmi.

Naval Enna Jewel was released in theatres on 18 August 2017. At the 47th Kerala State Film Awards, the film won the Best Makeup Artist for N. G. Roshan. It won two awards at the 2018 Amsterdam International Film Festival—Best Actress (Kadem) and Best Original Score (Eddie Torres). Menon won Best Actress at the 7th Delhi International Film Festival.

== Plot ==
Asma is the eldest daughter in a poor Muslim family in Malabar. Asma is married to a 70-year-old Iranian as his fifth wife. Soon the Iranian dies and Asma becomes a widow with one child. But Asma's daughter Naval gets good education and grew into a progressive woman. Her guardian, Chachu made all this possible. And one day Naval had to kill a man for attempting rape. Naval gets a death sentence for the same. Then it is revealed that Chachu is not a man but Asma. Then the film follows Asma's attempts to help Naval.

== Cast ==
- Shwetha Menon as Asma and Chachu
- Reem Kadem as Naval Al Ameer
- Adil Hussain as Murshthak Hussain
- Anu Sithara
- Alen Matters as Aslam
- Sudheer Karamana
- Manikandan Pattambi
- Anjali Nair as Ayisha
- Paris Laxmi
- Chali Pala as Musaliyar
- Renny Johnson as Hussain Babba
- Chinnu Korah as Teacher

== Production ==
The film was produced by Cyriac Mathew Alencheril, who also acted in the film under the stage name Alen Matters. Renjilal Damodaran, who co-produced and directed the film, co-wrote the screenplay with V. K. Ajith Kumar. The film explores the theme of Arabi kalyanam, a tradition in Kerala where a minor Muslim girl is married to an older Arab man, leading to her subsequent estrangement. The story was inspired by real-life individuals and incidents. Shwetha Menon played one of the main lead roles. She did a makeover to portray an elderly man. For the title role, American actress of Iraqi origin, Reem Kadem was cast. Her character was based on a real Malayali Muslim woman. Adil Hussain played an Iranian government official who speaks Malayalam. The film was shot in Muscat, Oman, Iran, and some prison scenes in Viyyur, Kerala. Kadem completed her portions in the film by April 2016. The film was simultaneously shot in Malayalam and English, requiring actors to enact the same scene twice in both languages while filming.

== Soundtrack ==
The film soundtrack consist of three Malayalam songs and one English song. Music of Malayalam songs was composed by M Jayachandran, with lyrics by Rafeeq Ahammed and Kavyamayi Renjilal. The fourth song is by Eddie Torres and Ashley Garland.

Track listing
No.	Title	Lyrics	Music	Singer(s)	Length
1.	"Neelambal Nilavodu"	Kavyamayi Renjilal	M Jayachandran	Shreya Ghoshal	4:20
2.	"Rakkadalala Mele"	Rafeeq Ahamed	M Jayachandran	Shreya Ghoshal & Haricharan	4:35
3.	"Ee Vazhiyil Pathivayi"	Kavyamayi Renjilal	M Jayachandran	M Jayachandran	2:29
4.	"Mother"	Eddie Torres	Eddie Torres & Ashley Garland	Ashley Garland	3:43

== Reception ==
=== Critical response ===
Meera Manu of Deccan Chronicle rated 3.5 out of 5 stars and stated, "the movie simply reminds us no matter how loud we boast about freedom, for women it is a far cry". Asha Praksh of The Times of India gave 2.5 out of 5 stars, and wrote that "the film does have a brilliant story, no doubt, with an unpredictable twist at the end but the way it is executed leaves a lot to be desired", adding that the film would have been better if it had "stuck consistently to a realistic mode of story-telling sans drama".

=== Awards ===
At the 47th Kerala State Film Awards, the film won the Best Makeup Artist for N. G. Roshan. At the 2018 Amsterdam International Film Festival, the film was nominated for Best Feature Film (Renjilal), Best Original Score (Eddie Tores), Best Actress (Kadem), and Best Supporting Actress (Menon). It won two awards—Best Actress (Kadem) and Best Original Score (Eddie Torres). It was screened at the Boston International Film Festival. Menon won Best Actress at the 7th Delhi International Film Festival.
