= Uncle Bun =

- Directed by: Bhadran
- Screenplay by: Bhadran; P. Balachandran (dialogues)
- Story by: Bhadran
- Based on: Uncle Buck by John Hughes
- Produced by: Ajitha Hari Pothan
- Starring: Mohanlal; Charmila; Khushbu; Nedumudi Venu
- Cinematography: K. P. Nambiathiri
- Edited by: K K Balan
- Music by: Background score: Johnson; Songs: Raveendran
- Production company: Supriya International
- Release date: 15 August 1991
- Country: India
- Language: Malayalam

Uncle Bun is a 1991 Indian Malayalam-language film written and directed by Bhadran, and starring Mohanlal in the title role, as an obese youngster and Charmila in lead roles. The film is a remake of the 1989 film Uncle Buck and also the official Malayalam debut of Tamil actress, Khushbu Sundar, as second female lead role, after Charmila.

Special costumes were designed for Mohanlal, for his obese look by art director Sabu Cyril. The film included a lot of special effects sequences including a shot featuring a 360-degree head-turn. A. Vincent and Jayanan Vincent were hired for the special effects photography, as there were no computer-generated graphics during the time.

== Plot ==
Jameskutty Chacko aka Kuttichan (Nedumudi Venu) is an ex-NRI settled in a hilly town along with his wife, Sarah and three children. One day, James and Sarah are forced to rush back to the US to look after his brother-in-law, who gets critically ill.

James resorts to entrusting his children's custody to his younger brother Charlie Chacko (Mohanlal). Charlie has a heart of gold, is very fond of pets, especially rabbits, and is good in music and dance. However, he is obese and asthmatic, while leading a solitary life spending his spare time smoking and drinking, as a result of a bitter past. Sarah considers Charlie responsible for the untimely demise of her younger sister Rosie (Charmila), who once used to be Charlie's love interest.

Charlie moves into the family home to take care of the children, Asha, Vinu and Mariah. Charlie wins over the younger children, even earning the nickname 'Uncle Bun'. However, the 16-year old Asha, who is a typical spoiled teenager, treats Charlie with contempt. While staying with the family, Charlie is often tormented by the memories of the past, when he was in love with Rosie. Asha clashes with Charlie when he sternly forbids her to meet her boyfriend Roy, who apparently had a shady character. At a local club, Charlie runs into Roy, who is revealed to be a serial womanizer. There, Charlie also meets Geetha (Khushbu), a dancer in the club who gets attracted to an affable Charlie.

Asha runs into trouble for cheating during a class examination, which triggers her expulsion from the school. However, Charlie, as her guardian in charge, manages to earn the respect of the matrons in charge of the school and give her another chance. On their way back, they run into Geetha, who follows Charlie all the way to his house and gets acquainted with the rest of the children as well, much to Asha's chagrin. Charlie manages to interrupt another of Asha's date with Roy. She reaches her home and vents her rage by physically abusing the elderly housekeeper Gloria, (Philomina) who leaves the house in tears, much to the shock of Charlie.

Upon Geetha's persistence, Charlie shares his sordid past with her, which further deepens the bond between the two. Charlie thwarts another date of Asha with Roy at a film theater, leaving her seething. When a child's play goes hilariously awry, Mariah is greeted by the young neighbor, who also liked Charlie. When Charlie goes there to fetch Mariah, Asha sees it as a golden opportunity to turn the tables against him. Asha asks Geetha to go and see things for herself. An otherwise harmless dancing spree frames Charlie in front of Geetha as a flirt. Devastated, Geetha splits up with Charlie.

Roy arranges a private meet up with Asha at an isolated house. Picking up a stray lead, Charlie reaches the place in time, beats up Roy and brings Asha back home. A violent Asha attacks Charlie and accuses Charlie of destroying Rosie's life. It is revealed that while dying in Charlie's arms, Rosie told him that her act to commit suicide was the result of her being cheated on by another man. Charlie silently took the blame all for himself, not wanting to tarnish her name. It is that chain of horrid events, which has made Charlie to save Asha at all costs, while under his watch.

In a fit of frenzy, Asha locks up Charlie while struggling with his asthma, cuts off the power supply, leaving her siblings scared in the dark. She runs away from her house and reaches Roy's. However, Roy and his friend try to rape Asha. Like another divine intervention, Charlie breaks in and saves Asha after a gruesome fight. Asha tries to commit suicide, just like her deceased aunt. However, Charlie stops her in the nick of time. On their way back home, Charlie tells Asha all about the past and why he took the blame for the past fourteen years.

The film comes to an end, where everyone, including Sarah, welcomes Charlie into their hearts. Asha makes up for her previous hostility towards Charlie, by approaching Geetha and paving the way for the couple to reunite and live happily ever after.

== Cast ==
- Mohanlal in a dual role as
  - Charlie Chacko
  - Chacko, Charlie's deceased father (cameo)
- Charmila as Rosie
- Khushbu as Geetha Krishnan
- Nedumudi Venu as Jameskutty Chacko a.k.a. Kuttichan
- Sangeeta as Saramma James
- Rani as Asha James
- Monica as Maria James
- Philomina as Gloria Therathi a.k.a. Ayamma
- Santhakumari as Sister (cameo)
- Sukumari as Head Mistress (cameo)
- Mala Aravindan as Mathai, a marriage broker
- Sankaradi as Ittiyachan (cameo)
- Usha
- Bahadoor as Ittiyachan's brother-in-law (cameo)

== Music ==
The score was composed by Johnson while the songs were composed by Raveendran and lyrics were penned by Pazhavila Rameshan.

Track	Song	Artist(s)
1	Ambilikkalayoru	Dr. K. J. Yesudas
2	Don't Drive Me Mad	Dr. K. J. Yesudas, Malgudi Subha
3	Idayaraaga	Dr. K. J. Yesudas, K. S. Chithra
4	Kurukuthikannulla	Dr. K. J. Yesudas

== Awards ==
- Kerala Film Critics Award for Best Child Artist - Master Amith
