= Kalamandalam Hyderali =

Indian singer

Kalamandalam Hyderali കലാമണ്ഡലം ഹൈദരാലി
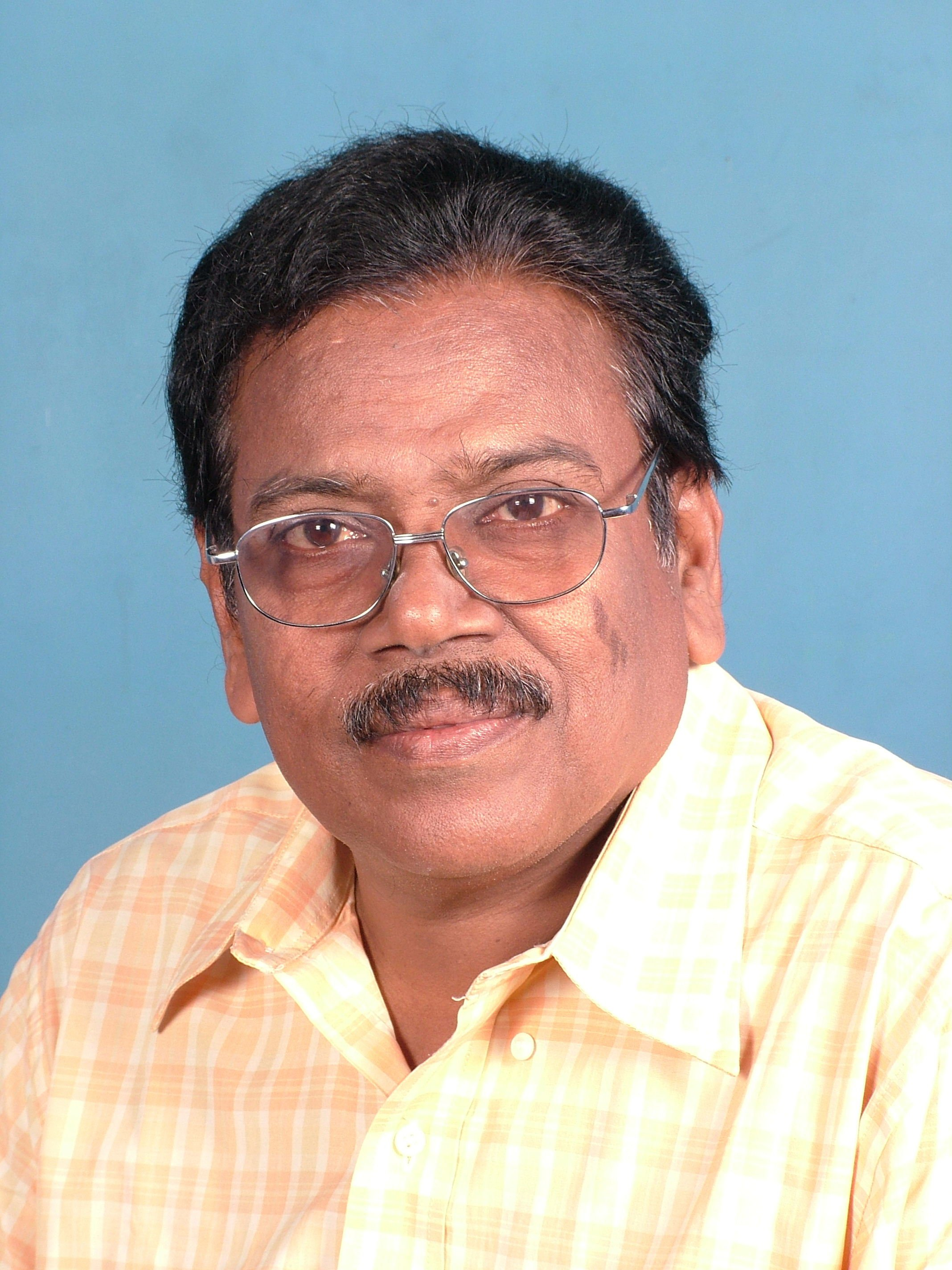
- Kalamandalam Hyderali

Background information
- Born: Hyderali; 5 September 1946; Wadakkancherry, India
- Died: 5 January 2006 (aged 59) Wadakkancherry, India
- Genre: Kathakali
- Occupation: Singer

Kalamandalam Hyderali (5 September 1946 – 5 January 2006) was one of the best Kathakali singers of his generation, and the first non-Hindu artiste to make a mark in the four-century-old classical dance-drama from Kerala in south India.

== Life ==
Hyderali was a native of Ottupara in Wadakkanchery of Thrissur district. His father, Moidutty, was an exponent of Mappila Paattu. The art world first took notice of little Hyderali's talent when he won a local-level competition, singing the Malayalam film song "Kalle Kaniville".It was when he was 11 years old that Hyderali joined Kerala Kalamandalam. Hailing from a poor family, his parents had struggled to pay the admission fee -— incidentally "a Hindu and a Christian" helped him secure admission in the premier performing arts institute, as Hyderali later recalls in his autobiography.

== Education ==
At Kalamandalam, he received training from gurus like Kalamandalam Neelakantan Nambisan, Sivaraman Nair and Kalamandalam Gangadharan. His contemporaries at the institution included Madambi Subrahmanian Namboodiri, Kalamandalam Sankaran Embranthiri and Kalamandalam Tirur Nambissan. A while after passing his course, M. K. K. Nair, a patron of the arts, offered him a job in the FACT Kathakali school in Ambalamedu off Kochi. Hyderali, along with Kalamandalam Sankaran Embranthiri and Venmani Haridas, was instrumental in remoulding the aesthetics of Kathakali music and making it more popular. Hyderali had a light, pliant and sonorous voice that tuned well to softer and melodramatic scenes on Kathakali stage. His emotive singing used to earn him praise from masters like Kalamandalam Gopi. Hyderali was among the pioneers who rendered Kathakali music as independent programmes, without the visual foreground. Their innovation has since come to stay.

== Humiliation ==
Hyderali, suave and soft-spoken, nurtured the wish to see Lord Krishna in real life, but had to occasionally suffer professional humiliation on religious grounds, as entry to temples (where a chunk of Kathakali shows finds stage) in Kerala is barred for non-Hindus. Kathakali aficionados recall how those in control of an ancient temple near Haripad actually pulled down a part of the compound wall and extended the platform there for Hyderali to sing for the Kathakali performers inside the compound. A feature film was made in 2019 by kiran G.nath in Malayalam language named Kalamandalam Hyderali (film)

== Later life ==
Hyderali, by the 1990s, had gained a reputation for his expertise in handling both romantic/dramatic and choreographically dense classical stories in Kathakali. But, just as his career was peaking, a road accident at Mullurkara near his hometown, while he was on his way to his alma mater driving a car, claimed the musician's life on 5 January 2006. Hyderali's music, basically built on a throat profile that sounds more upcountry (like Hindustani classical or Ghazal), seem to live on—at least in parts in the next couple of generations of Kathakali musicians. Prime among them stands Pathiyoor Sankarankutty, who Hyderali groomed during the latter's younger days. A section of buffs also finds Kalamandalam Hareesh to possess streaks of similarity with Hyderali's style of singing.

== Death ==
Hyderali died in a car accident near Mullurkara, Thrissur district on 5 January 2006.
