= Thambikku Indha Ooru =

- Theatrical release poster
- Directed by: Badri
- Written by: Badri
- Produced by: J. Saravanan; C. Baskar
- Starring: Bharath; Prabhu; Vivek; Sana Khan; Madalsa Sharma; Ranjith
- Cinematography: Saalai Sahadevan
- Edited by: S. Surajkavee
- Music by: Dharan Kumar
- Production company: V. K. Media
- Release date: 5 March 2010
- Country: India
- Language: Tamil

Thambikku Indha Ooru (transl. Brother is from this town) is a 2010 Indian Tamil-language masala film written and directed by Badri. It stars Bharath, Prabhu, Vivek, Sana Khan, Madalsa Sharma, and Ranjith. The music was composed by Dharan Kumar with cinematography by Saalai Sahadevan and editing by S. Surajkavee. The film was released on 5 March 2010.

== Plot ==
Akil is a rich youth who runs a restaurant along with his buddy Cola Kumar in Singapore. As it happens, his father Rajasekhar is surprised when Akil refuses to marry Priya. Akil goes against his father's wish as he is in love with Divya. Angered at Akil's denial, Priya's father spills out the truth that Akil is not Rajasekhar's real son but an orphan who was raised by him. Shocked by the revelations, Akil decides to embark on a journey and find out his biological parents, whom he learns are living in Chengalpet.

On his trip to his homeland, he starts to encounter problems in the form of Divya's father Thirumalai who is against their affair. He feels that her daughter as a popular sportswoman could earn more through endorsing various brands. Enters Kumaraswamy, who plays a crucial part in the whole story. Kumaraswamy has a long-held grudge against Rajasekhar as he thinks that the latter was responsible for his wife's death and decides to use Akil to lure his father back to India. The film reaches its climax when through Thangamani, Akil meets the nurse Kamsaadai, who performed the delivery for his mother after the accident and subsequently learns that Kumaraswamy is his real father.

Later, Akil goes to Kumaraswamy's house to inform him about his child who is alive but is attacked by Kumaraswamy and his henchmen. Kumaraswamy refuses to believe the truth about his son. Akil brings Kamsaadai to meet Kumaraswamy and tell him the truth about his living child. Kumaraswamy sees Kamsaadai and recognizes her as the same nurse who performed the delivery on his wife at the hospital following the accident. Kumaraswamy is shocked when Kamsaadai admits her mistake and reveals that his wife did give birth to a health baby boy, after which she died. Kamsaadai also reveals that she does not know about the baby's whereabouts at present. Akil decides not to tell Kumaraswamy the truth until his adoptive father Rajashekar is proven innocent.

Through Rajasekhar, Akil learns that Thirumalai is the real culprit who caused the accident, which resulted in the death of his real mother, Kumaraswamy's wife. Meanwhile, Kumaraswamy's trusted aide Naana aligns with Akil after the family doctor reveals that Akil is indeed Kumaraswamy's son. Naana also learns that while Rajasekhar is innocent, Thirumalai is the real culprit who caused the accident which resulted in the death of Kumaraswamy's wife. Naana and Akil make Thirumalai abduct Rajasekhar along with his wife and admit his wrongdoings unconsciously on the phone to Kumaraswamy through Cola Kumar, after which he finds out that Akil is Kumaraswamy's son.

Having learnt the truth behind his wife's death and Akil being his son, Kumaraswamy arrives at Thirumalai's hideout with Cola Kumar to rescue Akil, Rajasekhar, and his wife from Thirumalai. Kumaraswamy and Akil share an emotional reunion as father and son. Together, they fight Thirumalai and his goons. Kumaraswamy gets stabbed in the hip by Thirumalai during the fight but asks Akil to save Rajasekhar and his wife without worrying about him, which Akli does after taking out Thirumalai's goons. With all the misunderstandings cleared, Kumaraswamy and Rajasekhar, make peace and the two friends reunite with each other. Also, Akil and Divya reunite with each other and live together happily.

== Cast ==
- Bharath as Akilan (Akil)
- Prabhu as Kumaraswamy
- Vivek as 'Cola' Kumar
- Sana Khan as Divya
- Madalasa Sharma as Priya
- Ranjith as Thirumalai
- Nizhalgal Ravi as Rajasekhar
- Thalaivasal Vijay as Thangamani
- Saranya Ponvannan as Kumaraswamy's wife
- Yuvarani as Mrs. Rajasekhar

Uncredited

- O. A. K. Sundar as Naana
- Raviprakash as Priya's father
- M. S. Bhaskar as Golconda Kondal Rao
- R. S. Shivaji as Kannayiram
- Gowthami Vembunathan as Kamsaadai
- Lollu Sabha Manohar as Prisoner
- Visweswara Rao as Kondal Rao's right hand
- Lollu Sabha Seshu as Kondal Rao's right hand
- Citizen Mani as Villager
- Kota Srinivasa Rao as Kondal Rao's brother aka "Pedanna" (photographic appearance)

== Production ==
The film was initially titled Enga Veetu Pillai. Sana Khan, who plays a squash player, practised the sport for her role. The makers filmed some scenes at the third terminal of the Changi Airport, claiming Thambikku Indha Ooru to be the first Asian film to do so.

== Soundtrack ==
The soundtrack was composed by Dharan Kumar and was released by Think Music. It was released in late January 2010.

Track listing
No.	Title	Lyrics	Singer(s)	Length
1.	"Koothadu Machi"	Kapilan	Bharath, Blaaze, Prasad, Suchitra
2.	"Yaaradi"	Kapilan	Hariharan, Shreya Ghoshal
3.	"Yennai Yaar"	Kapilan	Naresh Iyer
4.	"Ore Minsaram"	Raajkumar	Benny Dayal
5.	"Mudhal Pen Niyae"	Kapilan	Javed Ali, Sindhu
6.	"Thambikku Indha Ooru"	Kapilan	Benny Dayal, Mukesh Mohamed

== Critical reception ==
Sify wrote, "Director Badri along with Bharath has dished out Thambikku Indha Ooru another pot-boiler using all the cliches and gimmicks associated with mass movie targeting the B & C audiences. The film has no story, logic, reason or continuity with scenes cyclostyled from earlier films". Pavithra Srinivasan of Rediff.com wrote, "Insane plot twists, ridiculous situations and completely illogical sequences follow, leading to an end that can't come sooner". Malathi Rangarajan of The Hindu wrote, "The Bharath-Badri combo travels on the beaten track of a boy-meets-girl romance and predictable villainy". She noted that the film's"saving graces" were few: "Prabhu's performance, Ranjith's ease as a villain and Bharath's footwork in that order".
