= Sucheta Bhide Chapekar =

Indian dancer and choreographer

- Born: 6 December 1948 (age 77)
- Other names: Sucheta Bhide
- Known for: Bharatnatyam
- Awards: Sangeet Natak Akademi Award

Sucheta Bhide Chapekar (born 6 December 1948) is an Indian classical dancer and choreographer. She is an exponent of Bharatnatyam. She is the founder of "Kalavardhini", a trust supporting the teaching and propagation activities in classical dance, where she also teaches Bharatnatyam. She has been a recipient of the Sangeet Natak Akademi Award (2007).

Born in 1948, Chapekar had her arangetram in 1963. She was trained under Acharya Parvati Kumar and K. P. Kittappa Pillai. In the subsequent years, she performed at many local concerts, including one at the Madras Music Academy in 1974. Post marriage, she moved to Pune. Encouraged by JRD Tata, who called her "blue-eyed beauty", she performed outside India for the first time in 1982. During the tour, she performed in London, Paris, and Rotterdam. During the 1980s, she performed various concerts in her home state of Maharashtra. It was at this time, she realised that Bharatanatyam did not have a great following in the state. She then came up with the idea of mixing Marathi and Hindi songs in her concerts. This eventually led to the formation of "Nritya Ganga", a Bharatanatyam concert which has about 80 compositions, all based on Hindustani classical music. Chapekar is the founder of "Kalavardhini", a charitable trust that supports the teaching and propagation activities in classical dance.

In the year 2008, filmmaker Amrita Mahadik directed Vyomagami, a documentary on the life and work of Chapekar. As a part of Chapekar's 60th birthday celebration, Vyomagami was produced by "Kalavardhini" and shown at Ganesh Kala Krida Manch, Pune, Maharashtra. Nrityatmika, a Marathi book penned by Chapekar was also released at the event graced by Padma Vibhushan Sonal Mansingh and other dignitaries.

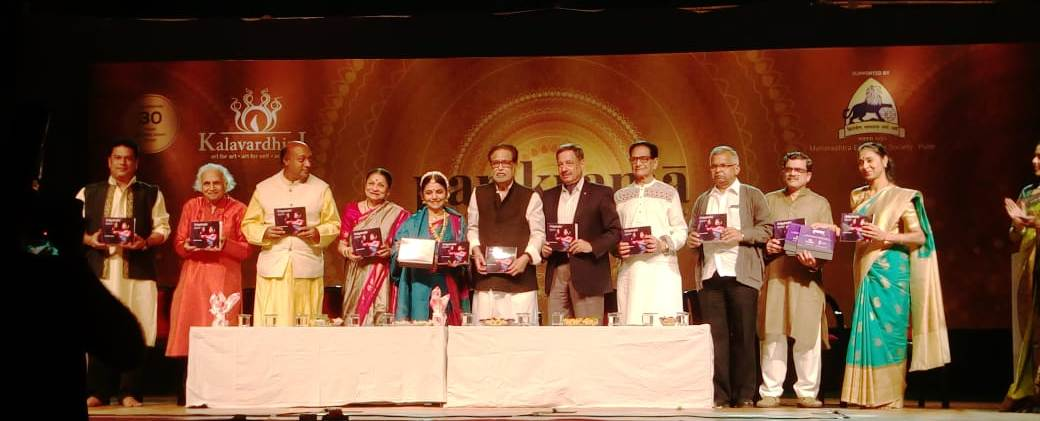
"Nrityatmika" (English) book release by Pandit Hridaynath Mangeshkar on Dec 06, 2018

In the year 2018, to mark Chapekar's 70th birthday celebration, She was felicitated by Padma Shri Pandit Hridaynath Mangeshkar in the Parikrama event that was graced by many dignitaries and Bharatanatyam stalwarts. During this event, Pandit Mangeshkar also released the English translation of Nrityatmika, translated by Bharatanatyam artiste Priti Gosar-Patil.

Chapekar is married and has a daughter named Arundhati Patwardhan, who is a trained dancer. In 2007, Chapekar was awarded with the Sangeet Natak Akademi Award for her contributions to classical dance.
