= Sangeet Natak Akademi =

Indian national level academy for performing arts

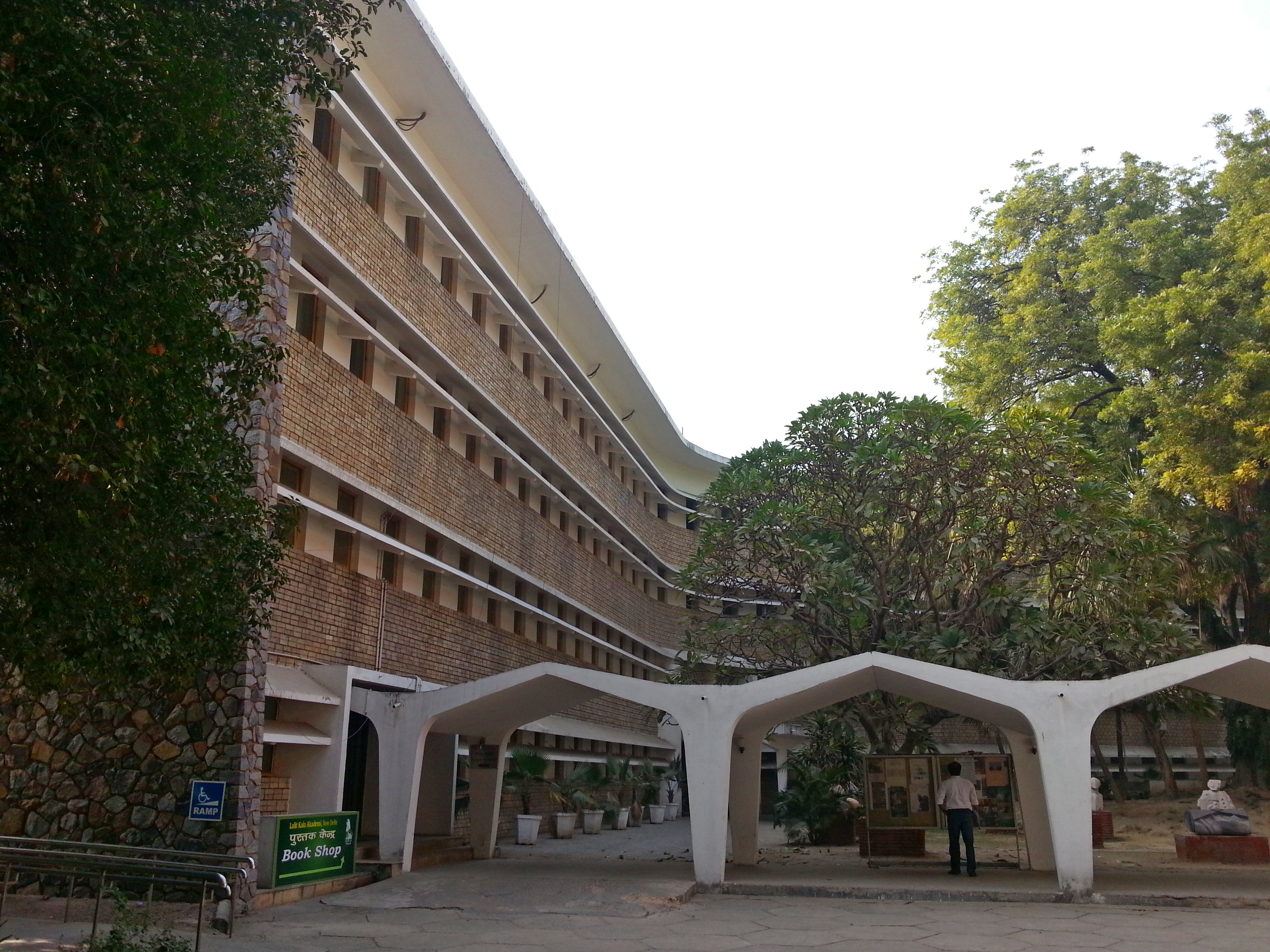
- Rabindra Bhawan, Delhi which houses the Sangeet Natak Akademi, Lalit Kala Akademi and Sahitya Akademi
- Abbreviation: SNA
- Formation: 1953; 73 years ago
- Headquarters: Rabindra Bhawan, Ferozeshah Road, New Delhi, India
- Region served: India
- Chairperson: Sandhya Purecha
- Vice Chairman: Joravarsinh Jadav
- Parent organisation: Ministry of Culture, Government of India.
- Website: sangeetnatak.gov.in

Sangeet Natak Akademi (The National Academy of Music, Dance and Drama in English), in New Delhi, is the national academy for performing arts set up by the Government of India. It is an autonomous body of the Ministry of Culture, Government of India.

== History ==
It was set up by the Indian education ministry on 31 May 1952 and became functional the following year, with the appointment of its first chairman, P. V. Rajamannar. Rajendra Prasad, the first President of India, inaugurated it on 28 January 1953 in a special function held in the Parliament House. The academy's Fellowship and Award are considered very prestigious.

== Functions ==
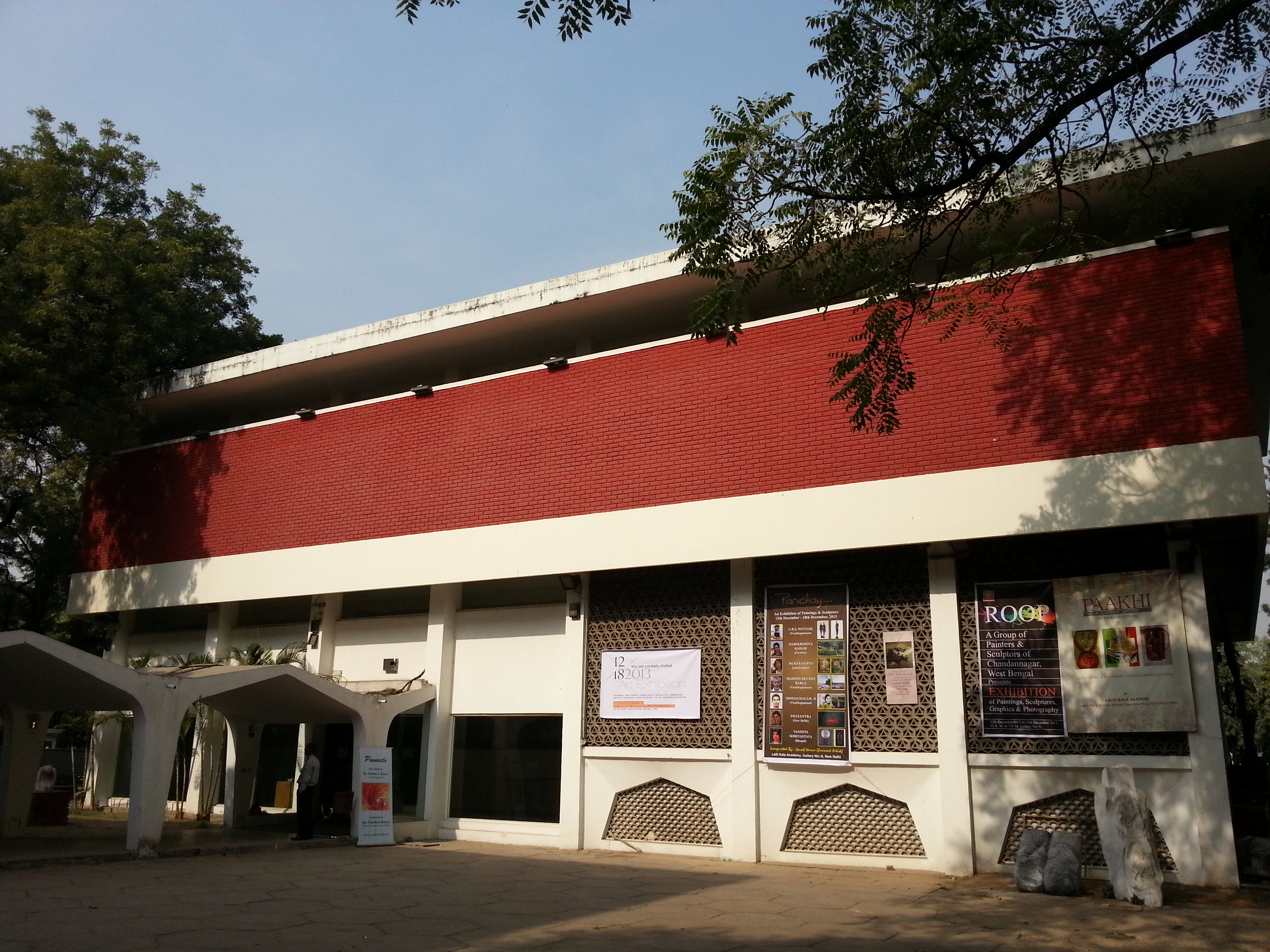
Lalit Kala Gallery, at Rabindra Bhawan complex, Delhi.

Sangeet Natak Akademi is an autonomous body of the Indian Ministry of Culture. The academy functions as the apex body of the performing arts in the country to preserve and promote the cultural heritage of India expressed in music, dance and drama. It also works with governments and art academies in states and territories of the country.

Its main functions are:

- Subsidizes the work of institutions engaged in teaching, performing or promoting music, dance, or theatre
- Gives grants to aid research, documentation and publishing in the performing arts
- Organises and subsidises seminars and conferences of subject specialists
- Documents and records the performing arts for its audio-visual archive
- Renders advice and assistance to the government of India in the task of formulating and implementing policies and programmes in the field
- Carries a part of the responsibilities of the state for fostering cultural contacts between regions in the country, as well as between India and the world
- Organises its annual festival of music, dance and theatre in NCT Delhi.

=== Institutions and centres ===
SNA has established several institutions over the years:

- Dakshin Bharat Sanskritik Kendra, Hyderabad

The Sangeet Natak Akademi's South India Cultural Centre, or Dakshin Bharat Sanskritik Kendra, is located in Hyderabad. It was inaugurated on 12 February 2024 by former Vice President M. Venkaiah Naidu and Union Minister Kishan Reddy.

- Manipur Dance Academy, Imphal
- Sattriya Centre
- Kathak Kendra (National Institute of Kathak Dance), New Delhi in 1964
- Ravindra Rangshala Centers:
- Centre for Kutiyattam, Thiruvananthapuram, a national projects in the support of Koodiyattam (the age-old Sanskrit theatre of Kerala)
- Chhau Centre, Baripada/ Jamshedpur
- Northeast Centre

== Facilities ==
The academy is an important source of information and offers the following facilities.

=== Audio–visual archive ===
The academy's audio-visual archive has several audio/video tapes, photographs and films. It is the largest archive of its kind in the country and is extensively drawn upon for research on the performing arts of India.

=== Library ===
The academy maintains a reference library consisting of about 22,000 books.

Books on several subjects including Dance, Drama, Music, Theatre, Sociology, Folklore, Tribal Studies, Indian History and Culture, Indian Art, Religion and Epics, Mythology, Anthropology and Reference works such as Encyclopedias, Dictionaries, Yearbooks, Bibliographies, Indexes and Newspaper clippings about Academy Awards and eminent artistes in the field of performing arts, can be found here.

=== Gallery of musical instruments ===
The academy has a museum-gallery of musical instruments in Bhapang vadan, New Delhi. There are more than 200 musical instruments on display there.

=== Documentation unit ===
It has a documentation unit that collects and records works of masters in the field of music, dance and theatre on audio and video to help researchers. The academy produces several in-house publications.

== Awards and fellowships ==
=== Sangeet Natak Akademi Award ===
The Sangeet Natak Akademi Award is the highest national recognition given to practicing artists, gurus, employees and scholars. It carries a purse money of ₹ 1,00,000/-, a shawl, and a tamrapatra (a brass plaque). The number of awards given annually is 33 at present and, till date, over 1000 artists have been honoured.

=== Sangeet Natak Akademi Fellowship, Ratna Sadsya ===
Each year the Academy awards Sangeet Natak Akademi Fellowships, Ratna Sadsya, to distinguished individuals for their contribution to the field of arts, music, dance and theatre. The first Fellow of the Akademi was elected in 1954, and till date, the Akademi has honoured 123 eminent personalities as Akademi Fellows (Akademi Ratna).

=== Ustad Bismillah Khan Yuva Puraskar ===
Instituted in 2006, in memory of Ustad Bismillah Khan, this award is given to young artists (under 40 years of age) for their talent in the fields of music, dance and drama.

=== Tagore Ratna and Tagore Puraskar ===
On the occasion of the commemoration of the 150th birth anniversary of Rabindranath Tagore Sangeet Natak Akademi Tagore Ratna and Sangeet Natak Akademi Tagore Puraskar were conferred. These awards were given at events in Kolkata – Sangeet Natak Akademi Tagore Samman on 25 April 2012 and in Chennai Sangeet Natak Akademi Tagore Samman on 2 May 2012.

== Kala Deeksha Initiative ==
Sangeet Natak Akademi has started Kala Deeksha Initiative which is carrying on Guru Shishya Parampara. It was launched by Union Minister for Culture, Tourism and DoNER, Shri G. Kishan Reddy.

== Indian classical dances ==
The Sangeet Natak Akademi confers awards on nine Indian classical dance forms:

1. Bharatanatyam: originating in Tamil Nadu
2. Kathak: originating in Northern India
3. Kathakali: originating in Kerala
4. Kuchipudi: originating in Andhra Pradesh
5. Manipuri: originating in Manipur
6. Mohiniaattam: originating in Kerala
7. Odissi: originating in Odisha
8. Sattriya: originating in Assam
9. Chhau: originating in Jharkhand, Odisha and West Bengal

Commemorative stamps released by India Post 2003:

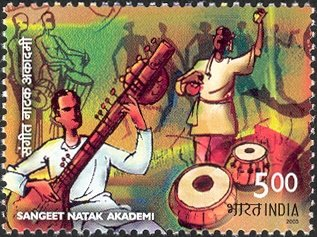

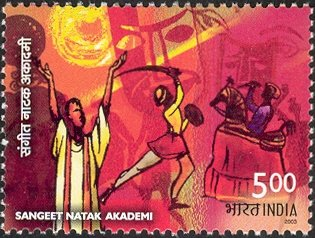

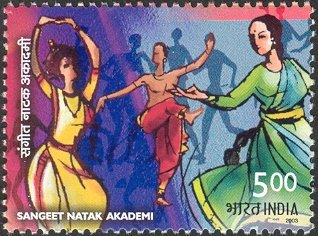

== See also ==
- Lalit Kala Akademi: equivalent national academy for visual arts
- Sahitya Akademi: equivalent national academy for literature
- Sangeet Nataka Akademi organised the First Film Seminar in 1955 in Delhi, inaugurated by Pandit Nehru
- List of Sangeet Natak Akademi Tagore Ratna and Tagore Puraskar Recipient
