= Kabhi Na Kabhi =

- Poster
- Directed by: Priyadarshan
- Written by: Javed Akhtar
- Produced by: R. Mohan
- Starring: Anil Kapoor; Jackie Shroff; Pooja Bhatt
- Cinematography: Ravi K. Chandran
- Edited by: N. Gopalakrishnan
- Music by: A. R. Rahman
- Production company: Shogun Films
- Distributed by: Eros Entertainment
- Release date: 17 April 1998
- Running time: 171 minutes
- Country: India
- Language: Hindi

Kabhi Na Kabhi (transl. Sooner or later) is a 1998 Indian Hindi-language action film co-written and directed by Priyadarshan. It stars Anil Kapoor, Jackie Shroff and Pooja Bhatt. The film was produced by R. Mohan (aka GoodKnight Mohan) in the banner of a Malayalam film production company, Shogun Films. The film which began production in 1994 had a delayed release on 17 April 1998.

== Plot ==
Kachra Seth runs an empire of collecting garbage, which is merely a front to cover-up for his other business like drug trafficking. He recruits a select group of people to carry out unpleasant tasks such as beating someone up, or even killing someone. One of his recruits is Jaggu, who will do anything for a price. Jaggu loves Tina but is afraid to tell her. When Jaggu's mother is hospitalized, he comes to Kachra for monetary assistance, he is assigned to a task instead, and unable to complete the task he is apprehended by the police with the assistance of a librarian and is subsequently found guilty and sent to prison. Jaggu's place is taken by Rajeshwar, shortly called Raja, who is also attracted to Tina and even rescues her from one of Kachra's goons, Chhabile and they fall in love. When Jaggu returns from prison, he finds his mother has died, and his sister missing, believed to have killed herself. In anger, he concocts a full-proof plan to kill the librarian, and does. Jaggu does not know the librarian is none other than Raja's father and Raja swears to hunt down his father's killer. When Kachra Seth learns of Raja and Jaggu's rivalry, he uses his goons also but when Jaggu's sister comes alive, Raja saves her from street goons, Jaggu goes on kill spree to save Raja from Kachra Seth and his goons. In the end, Jaggu dies in the arms of Raja after Raja kills Kachra Seth.

== Cast ==
- Anil Kapoor as Rajeshwar "Raja"
- Jackie Shroff as Jaggu
- Pooja Bhatt as Tina
- Paresh Rawal as Kachra Seth
- Tinu Anand as Chhabile
- Aloknath as Rajeshwar's Father
- Rohini Hattangadi as Tina's Aunty
- Sukumari as Jaggu's Mother
- Mac Mohan as Tatya

== Soundtrack ==
Kabhi Na Kabhi

Soundtrack album by A R Rahman
- Released: October 1997 (India)
- Studios: Panchathan Record Inn; AM Studios
- Genre: Feature film soundtrack
- Label: Bombino Music
- Producer: A. R. Rahman

A R Rahman chronology
Vishwavidhaata (1997)	Kabhi Na Kabhi (1997)	Jeans (1998)

The score and soundtrack were composed by A. R. Rahman with lyrics by Javed Akhtar and Tamil lyrics by Palani Bharathi. This was supposed to be the first Bollywood project of Rahman which he signed before Rangeela. But due to undisclosed reasons, release of the film was delayed. Rahman reused the song "Anjali Anjali" from 1994 Tamil film Duet as "Mil Gayi Mil Gayi" as per the director's request. This is the only song sung by Kumar Sanu for A. R. Rahman.

Reviewer of Screen India said, "A. R. Rahman spins another fizzy, frothy score for this long overdue film. This is vintage Rahman—resolutely stubborn in style—yet, it makes for much pleasant listening." The soundtrack also proved popular upon release.

The song "Tu Hi Tu" was remastered as "Manase Manase" in the Tamil movie Nenjinile (1999).

Kabhi Na Kabhi (Original Motion Picture Soundtrack)
No.	Title	Singer(s)	Length
1.	"Mere Yaara Dildara"	S. P. Balasubrahmanyam, Hariharan, K. S. Chithra	5:48
2.	"Shukriya Tera Shukriya"	S. P. Balasubrahmanyam	6:56
3.	"Tu Hi Tu"	M. G. Sreekumar, K. S. Chithra, A. R. Rahman	5:58
4.	"Tum Ho Meri Nigahon Mein"	Hariharan & Sujatha	5:32
5.	"Mere Dil Ka Wo Shehzaada"	Asha Bhosle	5:43
6.	"Mil Gayi Mil Gayi"	Kumar Sanu, Alka Yagnik	6:01
