= Idanazhiyil Oru Kaalocha =

- Directed by: Bhadran
- Written by: Bhadran; Balachandran Chullikkad (Story)
- Produced by: Johnson Sebastian; Sajjan Mathew
- Starring: Karthika; Vineeth; Jayabharathi; Thilakan
- Cinematography: U. Rajagopal
- Edited by: M. S. Mani
- Music by: V. Dakshinamoorthy
- Production company: Seven Arts International
- Distributed by: Seven Arts International
- Release date: 16 April 1987
- Country: India
- Language: Malayalam

Idanazhiyil Oru Kaalocha (transl. A footstep in the alleyway) is a 1987 Indian Malayalam-language film written and directed by Bhadran from a story by Balachandran Chullikkad. The film stars Karthika, Vineeth, Jayabharathi and Thilakan in the lead roles. The film has musical score by V. Dakshinamoorthy.

The plot is about a college student and the problems he faced.

== Cast ==
- Vineeth as Ananth Shankar
- Jayabharathi as Parvathy, Ananth's mother
- Karthika as Abhirami Krishnakumar
- M. G. Soman as Prem Shankar IAS, Ananth's father
- Thilakan as Father Bennis
- Adoor Bhasi as Ananth's grandfather
- Ashokan as Vincent Vattoli
- Sankaradi as College Principal Father K. M.
- Kakka Ravi as Mohanroop
- Paravoor Bharathan as Vattoli Father (cameo role)

== Soundtrack ==
The music was composed by V. Dakshinamoorthy and the lyrics were written by O. N. V. Kurup and Traditional.

No.	Song	Singers	Lyrics	Length (m:ss)
1	"Aavanippoovani"	K. J. Yesudas, K. S. Chithra	O. N. V. Kurup	
2	"Devante Chevadiyanayukilo"	K. J. Yesudas	O. N. V. Kurup	
3	"Karaagre Vasathe"	Vijay Yesudas	Traditional	0:37
4	"Thedithedi Ananju"	K. J. Yesudas	O. N. V. Kurup	
5	"Vaathilppazuthilooden"	K. J. Yesudas	O. N. V. Kurup	
6	"Vaathilppazuthilooden"	K. S. Chithra	O. N. V. Kurup	
