= Sankaran Embranthiri =

Indian singer

Kalamandalam Sankaran Embranthiri (1944–2007) was a Kathakali musician, renowned for his contributions to the classical dance-drama from Kerala in South India. His shruti-aligned music, combined with a distinctive voice spanning three octaves, made him a notable figure in the field. In 1990, he suffered a major illness, impacting his career.

== Biography ==
=== Early life and training ===
Embranthiri was born in 1944 into a Brahmin family in Vellayoor village, Malappuram district, Malabar. He learned Carnatic music from Govinda Pisarody before joining Kerala Kalamandalam in 1958, where he studied Kathakali music under Kalamandalam Neelakantan Nambisan, Kalamandalam Gangadharan, Sivaraman Nair, and Madhava Panikkar. Madambi Subrahmanian Namboothiri, Kalamandalam Tirur Nambissan, and Kalamandalam Hyderali also joined Kalamandalam the same year.

=== Career ===
Embranthiri began performing in the Travancore region. He worked at the Unnayi Varrier Smaraka Kalanilayam in Irinjalakuda (1965) and later at the FACT Kathakali School near Kochi, where he retired as a teacher. He gained prominence in the 1970s, influencing singers like Kalamandalam Hyderali and Venmani Kalamandalam Haridas. He mentored Haridas upon his return to Kathakali after a hiatus.

In 1990, Embranthiri's health declined, requiring a kidney transplant in 1991. He resumed performing but faced further challenges, including diabetes and the amputation of his right leg. Despite these setbacks, he continued singing, performing from a wheelchair.

=== Death and legacy ===
Embranthiri died on 14 November 2007, in Aluva, near Kochi. He was survived by his wife and two daughters.

== Works and musical style ==
A devotee of Lord Krishna, Embranthiri had popular hits like "Ajitha Hare" and "Pari Pahimaam Hare". He performed Kathakali Pada kacheris (concerts) and participated in jugalbandi programmes with musicians like Neyyattinkara Vasudevan, Sreevalsan J Menon, and Ramesh Narayan.

== Recognition ==
Embranthiri received the Kerala Sangeetha Nataka Akademi Fellowship in 2002 and the Swathi Sangeetha Puraskaram in 2003.
