= R. Mohan =

Indian politician in Tamil Nadu

R.Mohan

Member of Parliament
- In office 1980 - 1984
- Preceded by: Parvathi Krishnan
- Succeeded by: C.Q.Kuppuswamy
- Constituency: Coimbatore

Member of Legislative Assembly
- In office 1989 - 1991
- Preceded by: R.Sengaliyappan
- Succeeded by: B. Govindarasu
- Constituency: Singanallur

Personal details
- Born: July 3, 1943 Coimbatore, Tamil Nadu
- Died: 10 December 2024 (aged 81) Coimbatore, Tamil Nadu
- Party: Dravida Munnetra Kazhagam
- Spouse: Suguna
- Parent: N. Rengasamy

Rengasamy Mohan (Era. Mohan, 3 July 1943 – 10 December 2024) was an Indian politician and a member of the 7th Lok Sabha. He belongs to the Dravida Munnetra Kazhagam. He contested from Coimbatore Lok Sabha constituency in Tamil Nadu and was elected to the Lok Sabha. In the 1989 Tamil Nadu Legislative Assembly election, he was elected to the Tamil Nadu Legislative Assembly from Singanallur constituency. He belongs to the Gavara Naidu community.

== Electoral Performance ==
=== General Elections 1980 ===
1980 Indian general election: Coimbatore
Party	Candidate	Votes	%	±%
DMK	R. Ram Mohan Alias Era Mohan	276,975	54.29	
CPI	Parvathi Krishnan	2,20,866	43.29	
INC(U)	K. Ramalingam	4,219	0.83	
Independent	B. Rajan Alias Rajagopal	3,166	0.62	
Margin of victory		56,109	11.00	6.88
Turnout		5,10,166	66.06	−4.33
Registered electors		7,85,260		5.65
DMK gain from CPI		Swing	2.23	

== Tamil Nadu Assembly 1989 ==
1989 Tamil Nadu Legislative Assembly election: Singanallur
Party	Candidate	Votes	%	±%
DMK	Mohan Era	63827	49.40	▲49.40
INC	Subaiah PL	25589	19.81	▼25.11
CPI(M)	Kannan S	22148	17.14	▲17.14
AIADMK	Karuppusamy N	15319	11.86	New
Independent	Balasundaram D	643	0.5	New
Margin of victory		38238		
Turnout		129195	70.5	
DMK gain from JP		Swing		

== Death ==
He died on December 10, 2024.
