= Spadikam =

1995 film directed by Bhadran

- Theatrical release poster
- Directed by: Bhadran
- Written by: Bhadran
- Dialogues by: C G Rajendra Babu
- Produced by: R. Mohan
- Starring: Mohanlal; Thilakan; Urvashi; Spadikam George
- Cinematography: J. Williams; S. Kumar
- Edited by: M. S. Mani
- Music by: S. P. Venkatesh
- Production company: GoodKnight Films
- Distributed by: Manorajyam Release
- Release date: 30 March 1995 (India)
- Running time: 158 minutes
- Country: India
- Language: Malayalam
- Budget: ₹1.70 crore (US$180,000)
- Box office: ₹12.95 crore (US$1.3 million)

Spadikam (transl. Crystal) is a 1995 Indian Malayalam-language action thriller film directed and co-written by Bhadran and produced by R. Mohan through Shogun Films. Starring Mohanlal, Thilakan, Urvashi and Spadikam George, the film revolves around Thomas Chacko alias Aadu Thoma, a ruffian estranged from his toxic father C.P. Chacko alias Kaduva Chacko, upon failing to meet the latter's high expectations.

Development of the script took Bhadran three years to complete. It was based on three real-life ruffians who lived around Pala. The dialogues were written by Rajendra Babu. S. P. Venkatesh composed Spadikam's soundtrack and background score and J. Williams and S. Kumar were the cinematographers. Valsan and M. S. Mani were the film's art director and editor, respectively. The film was extensively shot in and around the town of Changanassery in Kottayam district, and was completed in 45 working days. Except for three days of shooting in Madras (now Chennai), Spadikam was filmed in Kerala.

Produced on a budget of ₹75 lakh, Spadikam was released on 30 March 1995 to critical acclaim, primarily for the performances of the lead cast, dialogues and cinematography. It was commercially successful and went on to become one of the highest-grossing films of the year; Spadikam completed a 100-day run in several centers. In addition to the Filmfare Award for Best Film – Malayalam, Spadikam won the Best Director and Best Actor at the 43rd Filmfare Awards South. Mohanlal also won the Kerala State Film Award Best Actor at the 27th Kerala State Film Awards. The film was dubbed and released in Tamil as Yuddham in 1996. It was remade in Telugu as Vajram, Tamil as Veerappu and in Kannada as Mr. Theertha.

Spadikam, which attained cult status, is considered instrumental in introducing thug life glorification of Mollywood superstars on screen. The film is also considered a milestone in the career of Mohanlal. The film along with Devaasuram (1993) indirectly marked the beginning of a new image of Mohanlal, that of an action hero that would appeal to the masses. The character of Aadu Thoma has over the years become a pop culture icon. In March 2020, during the 25th anniversary of the film, the plan to digitally enhance and a re-release it in theatres was announced. A digitally remastered 4K Dolby Atmos version of Spadikam was released theatrically on 9 February 2023.

== Plot ==
Thomas alias "Aadu Thoma", is a well-known quarry owner and a gangster, who is the undefeated champion in his confrontations and leads his life on his own terms. He is the estranged son of a retired school headmaster C.P. Chacko alias "Kaduva Chacko" who is also a recipient of the President's medal award in mathematics. Thoma is a blemish on respectable Chacko's reputation and both never get along. His mother Mary and sister Jancy are always left to choose sides between the two of them while Chacko's brother Manimala Vakkachan supports Thoma.

In the flashback, unlike his father, Thoma wasn't interested in mathematics, but excelled in mechanical and electronic gadgetry. He builds an AM radio receiver inside a soap case, at a time when phonographs were a fad. Thoma's talent astonishes others, whereas his father is dismissive. He always compares his son to Balu, the best student in the class adding to his pressure. He expects Thoma to be a mathematician like him and forces his teacher Ravunni to fail him on the notion that only low grades will provoke him to study harder. When Thoma discovers this, he becomes outraged and burns the answer sheet in front of Ravunni and runs away from the village after stabbing Balu's right hand with a compass in anger and sorrow. Fourteen years later, Thoma returns as a changed man, no longer a prodigy. He has become a quarry owner, lorry driver and a gangster. His father still despises him and professes to love his sister more, who lived up to his expectations.

Pookoya, a local baron, is the newly made enemy of Thoma, along with his sub-inspector friend, Kuttikkadan for supporting Pookoya's daughter's relationship with a penniless teacher. Thoma's relationship with a prostitute gets revealed when the police shame him publicly and Jancy's wedding almost fails, further angering his father. This forces him to rat out his son to the police on a later occasion, surprising even Kuttikadan with the act. The relationship between the two further declines after this incident, whereby entering into a fit of rage, Thoma cuts off the sleeves of his Chacko's shirts. Chacko then repaints his Thoma's lorry with the word, Chekuthan (devil) and plants a coconut tree in front of their house, naming it after Thoma, to insult him. But later, Thoma himself intervenes and restores Jancy's marriage alliance.

Meanwhile, Ravunni who had resigned from the school after being deeply saddened by the ill fate which happened to Thoma, comes back with his daughter Thulasi, who was Thoma's childhood friend. The Vicar of the local church, Thulasi and Vakkachan try to mediate between the two, by trying to get Thoma invited by his father, to attend Jancy's wedding. Thoma attends the wedding, hoping for the better but is insulted by his father. This forces Jancy to take a stand against her father, stating that she prefers her brother's small necklace to her father's high dowry, in her marriage. The necklace was actually a gift from Thulasi given by Thoma and this leads him to be deserted on the day of her wedding. When Thoma learns this, he becomes happy and thanks Thulasi. Mary, who was waiting for the wedding to take place, leaves him as well. At this point, Ravunni points out to Chacko that in fact he did not love anybody, including Jancy and he only pretended to love her in order to degrade Thoma. He also states that as the reason why Jancy stood against him. With his pride struck the worst blow, Chacko is left all alone, to rethink on his actions and decisions.

Soon afterward, Thoma is stabbed by a goon Thorappan Bastin, who is employed by Pookoya, in retaliation for helping his daughter elope with her lover, the teacher. Chacko secretly visits his son in the hospital, with regret. Coming back to health, Thoma's attempt at revenge on Kuttikkadan is foiled, when Thulasi interferes. On learning that Thulasi loves him, he tries to prevent her. With her help, he tries to back out from his wrong outlook of life. Filled with the guilt of ruining his son's life, Chacko repaints Thoma's lorry from Chekuthan to Spadikam (crystal) and tries to commit suicide, which Thoma prevents. The two reconcile, thereafter. With a newfound joy, they, together, bring back his mother. He decides to quit everything and live for his family.

In a desperate attempt for revenge, Thoma's enemies unite against him. Pookoya and Kuttikadan tries to kill Thoma by placing a bomb in his lorry and blame Chacko. But Thoma manages to escape. In a tragic turn of events, Chacko is fatally shot by Kuttikadan while targeting Thoma. He becomes enraged and kills Kuttikadan. After visiting his deceased father at the hospital, Thoma is taken into police custody on charges of killing Kuttikadan, leaving the helpless family and Thulasi in tears.

== Cast ==
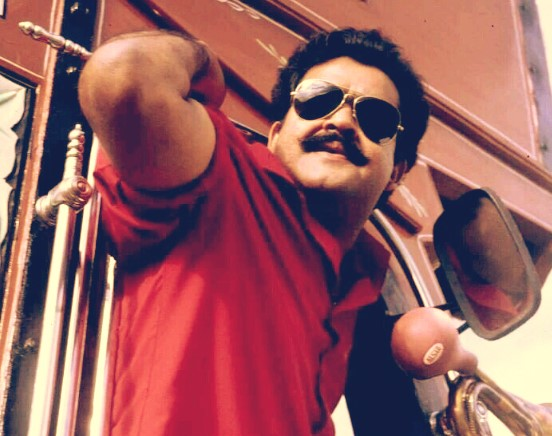
Mohanlal as Aadu Thoma

- Mohanlal as Thomas Chacko (Aadu Thoma), Chacko's son
  - Roopesh Peethambaran as Younger Thoma
- Thilakan as C. P. Chacko (Kaduva Chacko), a retired headmaster; Thoma's toxic and arrogant father
- Urvashi as Thulasi, Thoma's girlfriend
  - Arya Anup as Younger Thulasi
- Spadikam George as SI Kuttikkadan, a cruel and corrupt police officer, the main antagonist (voiceover by Shammi Thilakan)
- Rajan P. Dev as Manimala Vakkachan, Chacko's younger brother and Thoma's uncle who is always supportive and friendly towards Thoma
- Nedumudi Venu as Ravunni, Thulasi's father who is supportive of Thoma
- K. P. A. C. Lalitha as Mary Chacko (Ponnamma), Thoma's mother and Chacko's wife
- Ashokan as Jerry, Jancy's husband and Thoma's brother-in-law
- Chippy Renjith as Jancy Chacko, Thoma's younger sister
- Maniyanpilla Raju as Kunju Mohammad, Thoma's friend and lorry driver
- Karamana Janardanan Nair as Fr. Ottaplakkan, church vicar
- N. F. Varghese as Pachu Pillai, an honest police head constable and Balu's father who is supportive of Thoma
- Nizar as Chandy, Thoma's friend
- V. K. Sreeraman as Pookoya, Kuttikadan's friend and the secondary antagonist
- Silk Smitha as Laila
- Bindu Varapuzha as Mumthas
- Bahadoor as Kurup
- Kundara Johny as Maniyan, police constable and Kuttikadan's right hand
- Bheeman Raghu as SI Somasekharan (Not Pillai), Kuttikadan's friend, another corrupt cop
- Indrans as Gafoor
- Spadikam Sunny (PN Sunny) as Torappan Bastian, a gangster hired by Pookoya
- Paravoor Bharathan as Joseph, Jerry's father
- Kanakalatha as Geetha, Kuttikkadan's wife
- Sankaradi as V.S. Eswara Iyer, Sub Judge
- Chali Pala as Lukachan, Thoma's friend
- N. L. Balakrishnan as Pathrose
- Ajith Kollam as Georgekutty
- Rajinikanth (archived footage)

== Production ==
=== Development ===
It took two to three years of preparation for the film, the screenplay was rewritten a few times. Producer R. Mohan wanted to name the film Aadu Thoma which he felt was more appealing to the public. But Bhadran wanted to name it Spadikam. The character Thomas Chacko / Aadu Thoma was based on three real-life ruffians who lived around Pala, one of them was known by the nickname Irattachankan (the man with two hearts), another one used to remove his mundu to wrap his opponent's head for hitting, and the third one had a downfall during his peaks period. The character Chacko Mash was based on four real-life characters Bhadran knew from his life, one was his own father who used to compare him with other kids, and the other three were his school teachers. In an interview, Bhadran said that Spadikam was inspired by his own life, but not that the character Aadu Thoma is him, but the film draws inspiration from his parents, village, priest, teachers, and disabilities of the education system at that time.

=== Casting ===
Bhadran said he considered Mohanlal the best choice for the role because the character of Aadu Thoma as he was not only an alpha male but also had innocence and had self pity, he could emote all these characteristics perfectly. Shobana was first offered the role of Thulasi, but she could not sign the film as she had to leave for the United States for a dance program she already committed. Urvashi was cast in the role. Later Bhadran said that after watching the film he realized Urvashi was in fact the right choice for the role.

Bhadran wanted Thilakan to play the role of Chacko, but it was difficult to hire him as they were not in good terms after their last film Idanazhiyil Oru Kaalocha (1987), since the two had a verbal dispute during the film's dubbing process, as Bhadran recalls, they came close to hitting each other. Spadikam was written three to four years after this incident. There were suggestions from the film crew to cast Nedumudi Venu for the role (who was later cast in another role). According to Bhadran, Thilakan acknowledged that it was a mistake on his part and they reconciled, thus he was able to cast him. Thilakan's son Shammi Thilakan later said that he was instrumental in Thilakan's casting, Bhadran used to make unsuccessful visits to see Thilakan while he was in the hospital, but was not permitted by Thilakan. Shammi then acted as an agent for Bhadran to present him the story of Spadikam while he was in a good mood.

Nassar was originally fixed in the role of S.I Kuttikkadan, but he was unable to reach on schedule due to the unexpected extension of the schedule of another film he was filming. Bhadran found Spadikam George for the role accidentally when he saw him in front of a hotel he was staying. Impressed by his physique, Bhadran offered him the role, only then he realized George had already acted in a few films, he immediately agreed. Roopesh Peethambaran, who portrayed Thomas Chacko's childhood, himself asked for a role in the film when Bhadran visited their home, his father Peethambaran was Bhadran's friend. The man who played a goon named Thorappan Bastin hired to finish off Aadu Thoma was originally a cop. Santosh Sivan and Sabu Cyril were initially considered as cinematographer and art director respectively. However, they both unexpectedly left without citing a reason. This delayed shooting plans by a month and a half

=== Filming ===
The film was extensively shot in and around the town of Changanassery in Kottayam district. The house named Thekkedathu Mana was used as the house of Aadu Thoma and Chacko Mash. It was situated in Kudamaloor, Kottayam. The house was former Kerala chief minister E. M. S. Namboodiripad's mother's tharavadu. The scene in which Kuttikkadan arrest Thoma and Laila was filmed in Changanassery market. Some of the scenes are shot in thrissur District ( Mannuthy in Kerala Agricultural University and Kerala Veterinary and Animal Sciences University). The climax scene was filmed in a quarry in Chennai. George was injured while performing a stunt scene where he jumps in front of a moving jeep driven by Mohanlal. Due to his weight, he could not roll away from the vehicle as expected and the tyre ran over his leg. The injury was not serious and he recuperated in a few days.

== Music ==
Spadikam

Soundtrack album by S. P. Venkatesh
- Released: 30 March 1995
- Genre: Feature film soundtrack
- Length: 19:21
- Language: Malayalam
- Label: Wilson Audios
- Producer: S. P. Venkatesh

S. P. Venkatesh chronology
Mannar Mathai Speaking (1995)	Spadikam (1995)	Puthukottayile Puthumanavalan (1995)

The film's original songs and background score were composed by S. P. Venkatesh; lyrics for the songs were written by P. Bhaskaran. The soundtrack album was released by the label Wilson Audios. It consists of three songs. The song Ezhimala Poonchola was sung by K. S. Chithra and Mohanlal, Ormakal has a female and male version sung by Chithra and M. G. Sreekumar, respectively, Chithra also sung Parumala Cheruvile. The film's songs were chartbusters.

Spadikam (Original Motion Picture Soundtrack)
No.	Title	Singer(s)	Length
1.	"Ezhimala Poonchola"	K. S. Chithra, Mohanlal	5:02
2.	"Ormakal"	K. S. Chithra	4:56
3.	"Ormakal"	M. G. Sreekumar	4:56
4.	"Parumala Cheruvile"	K. S. Chithra	4:27
Total length:			19:21

The songs like 'Ezhimala Poonchola' and 'Parumala Cheruvile' sung by K.S Chithra were not usual as per her genre. This proved her prominence in item numbers too.

== Release ==
Spadikam was released on 30 March 1995. The film was certified with an U certificate by the Central Board of Film Certification.

=== Re-release ===
The film's digital remastering and restoration work was announced in March 2020. The original plan was to re-release the film in 4K Dolby Atmos in at least 100 theatres in Kerala during Onam 2020, but was halted after the COVID-19 pandemic. The remastering costed around ₹2 crore to complete and was done in Prasad Corporation in Chennai and S. P. Venktesh worked on the re-recording of the film, except for the portions where music comes along with dialogues as they could not dub the film again. In an interview Bhadran said that they will try to answer the doubt of audience that what happens to Aadu Thoma at the climax of the film. He also said that the remastered version will be three times better than the original in terms of audio-visual experience. The remastered version is 8.5 minutes longer than the original film as a few additional shots and also a scene introducing the character of Aadu Thoma. The new scene will feature 500 goats instead of the original 40. The film was distributed by newly formed company Geometrics. The remastering was done in Four Frames studio in Chennai. It is also notable that the hit song “ezhimalapoonchola” was re-recorded with KS Chithra and Mohanlal. The expenses for the re-release was around ₹2 cr.

On 29 November 2022, Mohanlal announced through social media that the remastered version of Spadikam will finally hit on theatres on 9 February 2023. The remastered version's trailer was released on 6 February 2023 on the Matinee Now YouTube channel. Several of the film's key actors had died at the time of the film's re-release, namely: Thilakan, K. P. A. C Lalitha, Silk Smitha, Nedumudi Venu, Rajan P. Dev, N. F. Varghese, Sankaradi, Karamana Janardanan Nair, Paravoor Bharathan and Bahadoor.

On February 9, 2023, a digitally remastered version of the film with 4K resolution and Dolby Atmos sound was re-released on 150 theatres in Kerala and around 500 theatres worldwide. The film received an overwhelming response from the audience resulting in a collection of ₹77 lakhs on the first day, setting new record for any re-release of an Indian film.

Sajesh Mohan of Onmanorama wrote "What makes Aadu Thoma irresistible is the superlative performance of Mohanlal. In Spadikam, Mohanlal is at his entertaining best as the unruly son who returns home after 14 years of self-imposed exile. Bhadran and R Mohan understood the pulse of the audience then. And their concoction has only aged perfectly, proves the response inside the theatre. However, At a time when political correctness is the buzzword, the viewers would find themselves at a tug of war while rewatching some of the Malayalam runaway hits and cult classics of yesteryears. It is the same for Spadikam.

Anna M. M. Vetticad of Firstpost wrote, "As I watched Spadikam this morning in a theatre in Delhi, I could not view it through a prism of nostalgia though. For as much as the storyline is gripping and substantial, the film is/was also committed to exaggeration and over-statement in the writing of situations and characters, and the acting by several members of the cast (Indrans’ over-acting in a supporting role, for one, is embarrassing to say the least); and the writer-director's mindset regarding women characters other than Jancy and Mary was appalling."

== Reception ==
=== Box office ===
Spadikam was a major commercial success. According to an article by Deepika in 1995, it grossed over ₹8 crore (US$830,000), becoming the highest-grossing film of the 1995. Over the years, the film has achieved a cult following. Aadu Thoma has since then become one of the iconic characters in Malayalam cinema. The digitally remastered 4K Dolby Atmos version released on 9 February 2023 grossed approximately ₹4.95 crore at the box office with ₹3.05 crore from Kerala alone. The film grossed ₹12.95 crore worldwide including re-release.

=== Critical response ===
In 2018, Fahir Maithutty of The News Minute wrote, "There are mass action entertainers. There are beautiful family dramas. And then there is Spadikam." In 2023, while reviewing the digitally remastered version, Anna M. M. Vetticad of Firstpost wrote, "The unflagging energy of the narrative, its pace, the script's push to leave children unfettered so that they may follow their dreams, the songs, the charismatic cast and a career-elevating performance by Mohanlal are what make this film memorable."

=== Accolades ===
Award	Category	Recipient	Result
Kerala State Film Awards	Best Actor	Mohanlal	Won
Kerala Film Critics Association Awards	Special Jury Award	Thilakan	Won
Filmfare Awards South	Best Film – Malayalam	R. Mohan, Bhadran	Won
Filmfare Awards South	Best Director – Malayalam	Bhadran	Won
Filmfare Awards South	Best Actor – Malayalam	Mohanlal	Won

== Remakes ==
The film was remade in Telugu as Vajram (1996), in Tamil as Veerappu (2007) and in Kannada as Mr. Theertha (2010).

== Cancelled sequel ==
Bhadran has clarified that the film will not have a sequel. He recalled in an interview that producer Mohan once approached him offering a Mercedes-Benz as remuneration for making a sequel to Spadikam, but he declined it. He said that the film ended with a closure for the story. The story was about a father who considers his son a devil and later realizes that his son was not a devil but pure as crystal. Thomas Chacko became Aadu Thoma because his father never understood his aspirations and dreams, instead compared him with other students and constantly snubbed him. Now that his father has acknowledged him, there is no reason for him to go back to his same despicable life. He has transformed back to Thomas Chacko from Aadu Thoma.
