= Acharya Parvati Kumar =

Acharya Parvati Kumar or Parvatikumar (27 February 1921–29 November 2012) was an Indian classical dancer, classical dance choreographer and scholar as well as Bharata Natyam guru.

== Life ==
Early Training in Dance: He learned Bharata Natyam under Guru Chandrashekhar Pillai. He also learned several compositions from Guru Mahalingam Pillai and Smt Maylapur Gauri Amma. He learned Kathakali from Guru Karunakar Panikar and Kathak from Guru Ratikant Arya and Guru Sunder Prasad.

Choreography: of Indian Dance-Ballets: Between 1942 and 1983 he choreographed over twenty ballets. These include- Dawn of a New Era (1942), Sita Haran (1943), Sundopsunda(1944), By 1951 (1948), Bharat Ki Kahani (1949), Rhythm of Culture (1950), Rajput Episode-Raja Rani ki Kahani (1956), Dekh Teri Bambai (1958), Discovery of India(1964), Krishna Leela(1965)

Choreography for Children's Ballets: Manitaichi Fajity(1947), billi Mausi ki Fajety (1948), Snow White and the Seven Dwarfs (1958), Panchatantra (1970), Apna Hath Jagannath (1980), Durga Zali Gauri (1983)

Choreography for Films: Between 1950 and 1968 he choreographed dance sequences for several Hindi Films. These include: Gavna, Daag, Badshah, Vishwamitra Menaka, Hum Hindoostani, Ek Moosafir Ek Hasina, Dil Deke Dekho, Tumsa Nahin Dekha, Kale Gore, Mr. X, Dhola Maru, Raj Mukut, Jai Mahalaxmi.

He also choreographed dance sequences for some regional films. These include, Postatil Mulgi (Marathi), Prem Andhla Asta (Marathi), Sudi Guntalu (Telugu)

Tours Overseas: In 1959, he was invited to Paris to present the ballet 'Dekh Teri Bamabi' at the invitation of Theatre de Nations, sponsored by the Indian National Theatre.

In 1969 he visited Romania and Hungary on a cultural tour sponsored by the Ministry of Education, Govt of India.

Founding of Dance Institutions: In 1968 he founded 'Tanjavur Nrityashala' to train students in the discipline of Bharata Natyam.

Research and Choreography of Marathi Nirupanas: In 1982 his path-breaking research on the Nirupanas of the Tanjavur Kings was published in the form of the 'Tanjavur Nritya Prabandha' by the Sahitya and Sanskriti Mandal, Maharashtra.

The Nirupanas of Serfoji Maharaj II (1777–1832), a descendant of the Bhonsle family of kings, were compositions written in Marathi but set to Carnatic music. These were researched and choreographed in dance-form by Acharya Parvati Kumar.

Research and Choreography of Abhinaya Darpanam: In 1986 and subsequently in 1992 he presented his key contribution to Bharata Natyam, the choreography in dance-form of the entire classical Sanskrit text, the 'Abhinaya Darpanam'

Awards: He has received several awards. They are: Maharashtra State Award for Distinguished Service in the Cultural Field (1969), F. I. E. Foundation Awards for Ichalkaranji (1979), Akhil Bharatiya Natya Parishad (1980), Sangeet Natak Academy Award for Choreography (1981), Marathi Natya Parishad, Mumbai (1982), Sharangdev Fellowship (1990), Maharashtra Gaurav Puraskar (1990).

He has also been honoured by the following institutions: Kala Chaya, Pune(1982), Bala Rangabhumi, Little Theatre, Mumbai (1982), Sahitya Sangha Mandir, Mumbai (1982), Yuvak Biradri, Mumbai (1983), Gana Kala Bharati, Ahmedabad(1983), Ganesh Prasad Social Forum, Mumbai(1991), Rangashree Ballet Troupe, Bhopal (1991), Kala Parichaya, Mumbai (1991), Konkan Kala Mandal, Maharashtra(1994)

Important Positions Held: Member of the General Council of the Sangeet Natak Academy, New Delhi (1980–1982)

Appointed as a member of the committee for the selection of young artists, by the Ministry of Education, Govt. of India (1978–1979)
