= Bhadran (director) =

Indian filmmaker and writer

Bhadran Mattel
- Born: Thomaskutty; 22 November 1952 (age 73); Pala, State of Travancore–Cochin (present day Kottayam, Kerala), India
- Occupation: Film director
- Years active: 1982–2005
- Spouse: Tessy

Bhadran Mattel is an Indian director and writer. His body of work explores themes such as victimization caused by poor parenting, psychological trauma and redemption, and the objectification of fatherhood, as well as childhood distress. His films often feature metaphorical representations of objects such as animals, birds, biblical references, and depictions of autocratic Christian culture in a specific region of Kerala.

In 1986, he won the Filmfare Award for Best Director – Malayalam for Poomukhappadiyil Ninneyum Kaathu and won two more Filmfare Awards in the Best Director category for Iyer the Great and Spadikam in 1990 and 1995, respectively..

Mattel's directorial works include the ruffian film Spadikam (1995), the psychic-precognition thriller Iyer the Great (1990), an investigative school drama Olympian Anthony Adam (1999), the film Uncle Bun (1991), about the parenthood of an obese caretaker, a psychic family drama Poomukhappadiyil Ninneyum Kaathu (1986), the musical Idanazhiyil Oru Kaalocha (1987), the film Udayon (2005), featuring a mighty land tyrant (2005), Indian political thriller Yuvathurki (1996), and more. Actors Mohanlal and Mammootty became frequent collaborators with Bhadran.

== Career ==
He worked as the 8th Assistant Director for Hariharan in Rajahamsam under the banner of Supriya, the production house. Beginning with the film Rajahamsam, he assisted director Hariharan in 14 films, progressing from an apprentice to an associate director.

The first film he directed was released in 1982. Ente Mohangal Poovaninju, starring Shankar, Mohanlal, Menaka, and Kala Ranjini. Bhadran's films drew inspiration from the lives of common people, blended with surrealism. In 1983 he released Changatham (Malayalam), starring Mammootty, Mohanlal, and Madhavi. At the time, Bhadran was focused on making 2-3 films per year.

The film Idanazhiyil Oru Kaalocha (A Footstep in the Aisle), released in 1987, explores the idea of a teenage boy developing feelings for an older woman. The film stars Vineeth as the teenage protagonist and Karthika as the elderly lady who becomes the object of his affection.

Iyer the Great, released in 1990, was a psychological thriller film directed by Bhadran, starring Mammootty and addressing a train accident in Peruman.

Spadikam (Prism), released in 1995, was an action-drama film written and directed by Bhadran. The prism divides white light into a spectrum of seven vivid colors. The title symbolizes how people continuously adapt and manipulate situations for personal gain. The film was one of the highest-grossing films in Kerala in 1995 and collected around INR 8 Crores. It was also the longest-running film of 1995, winning the Kerala State Film Award for Best Actor and the Filmfare Award for Best Actor. Spadikam was Bhadran's most successful commercial film, gaining cult status in Kerala's film culture.

In 2019, Bhadran announced that his next venture would be a film with Mohanlal,called Joothan, marking their first collaboration. Also in 2019, when film director Biju J. Kattackal announced that he would make the sequel to the film Spadikam, Bhadran opposed it, and the project had to be shelved.

== Filmography ==
=== Director ===
Year	Title	Cast
1982	Ente Mohangal Poovaninju	Shankar, Mohanlal, Menaka, Kalaranjini
1983	Changatham	Mammootty, Mohanlal, Madhavi
1984	Aattuvanchi Ulanjappol	Lakshmi, Madhu, Mammooty, Ratheesh
1986	Poomukhappadiyil Ninneyum Kaathu	Mammootty, Mohanlal, Rahman, Srividya
1987	Idanazhiyil Oru Kaalocha	Vineeth, Karthika
1990	Iyer the Great	Mammootty, Geetha, Ratheesh, Sobhana
1991	Uncle Bun	Mohanlal, Khushboo, Charmila
1995	Spadikam	Mohanlal, Thilakan Urvashi, Spadikam George, Rajan P Dev
1996	Yuvathurki	Suresh Gopi, Vijayashanti, Geetha, Ratheesh
1999	Olympiyan Anthony Adam	Mohanlal, Meena, Nassar, Jagathy Sreekumar
2003	Vellithira	Prithviraj, Navya Nair, Kalabhavan Mani
2005	Udayon	Mohanlal, Salim Ghouse, Laya, Kalabhavan Mani
