= List of songs recorded by Mohanlal =

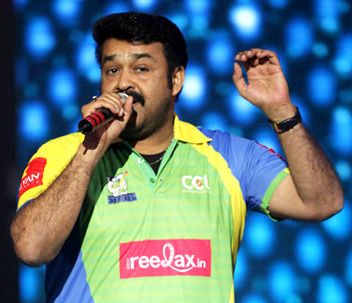
Mohanlal during the opening ceremony of the Celebrity Cricket League third season in 2013

Mohanlal is an Indian actor, director, producer, and singer who predominantly works in Malayalam cinema. The following is a list of songs sung by Mohanlal in films and includes independent albums.

== Discography ==
Denotes sole performance

Denotes album

Mohanlal discography
Year	Song title	Film / album	Composer	Co-singer(s)	Notes	Ref.
1985	"Neeyarinjo"	Kandu Kandarinju	Shyam	Mala Aravindan		
1985	"Sindhoora Megham"	Onnanam Kunnil Oradi Kunnil	Reghu Kumar	M. G. Sreekumar		
1986	"Hridayam Oru Vallaki (Bit)"	Padayani	A. T. Ummer			
1988	"Aarumilla"	Padamudra	Traditional			
1988	"Ombathu Maasam"	Padamudra	Vidyadharan			
1988	"Aei Moonnu"	Chithram	Traditional			
1988	"Kaadumi Naadumellam"	Chithram	Kannur Rajan	Sujatha Mohan		
1990	"A.E.I.O.U"	Aye Auto	Raveendran	Sujatha Mohan		
1991	"Awara Hoon"	Vishnulokam	Shankar Jaikishan			
1992	"Thithai"	Onathappan	M. G. Sreekumar			
1992	"Thai Thai Thalathil"	Onathappan	M. G. Radhakrishnan	M. G. Sreekumar		
1992	"Pookacha"	Onathappan	Berny-Ignatius			
1992	"Thamburu Kulir"	Soorya Gayathri	Raveendran	K. J. Yesudas, K. S. Chithra	Voice over in between the song	
1993	"Ponthidambu"	Butterflies	Raveendran	Raveendran, Pratheep		
1993	"Abalathwamalla"	Gandharvam	S. P. Venkatesh			
1993	"Vazhiyoram"	Kalipattam	Raveendran	K. S. Chithra		
1995	"Ezhimala"	Sphadikam	S. P. Venkatesh	K. S. Chithra		
1996	"Shyamayaam"	The Prince	Deva	K. S. Chithra	Voice over in between the song	
1997	"Harimuraleeravam"	Aaraam Thampuran	Raveendran	K. J. Yesudas, Raghu Kumar	Voice over in between the song	
1998	"Palamarachottil"	Chingappoovu	Berny-Ignatius			
1998	"Vezhambal Mamazha"	Chingappoovu	Berny-Ignatius	Manju Warrier		
1998	"Sneham Pookkum"	Ishtamanu	Vijayakumar	Abhirami		
1999	"Peppara Pera Pera"	Olympiyan Anthony Adam	Ouseppachan	Chorus		
1999	"Kaithapoovin"	Kannezhuthi Pottum Thottu	M. G. Radhakrishnan	K. S. Chithra		
1999	"Theercha"	Ustaad	Thej Mervin			
2001	"Maanatthe Ambili"	Ormakkai	M. Jayachandran	Sujatha Mohan		
2001	"Aaja"	Praja	M. G. Radhakrishnan	Vasundhara Das		
2002	"Hey Valuthaayoru"	Chathurangam	M. G. Sreekumar	M. G. Sreekumar		
2003	"Karu Karu Karutthoru"	Balettan	M. Jayachandran	Chorus		
2005	"Puthumannu"	Udayon	Ouseppachan	Ouseppachan		
2005	"Angethala"	Udayon	Ouseppachan	Shankar Mahadevan, Ganga Sitharasu, Kalidas Jayaram		
2005	"Ithaloornnu Veena"	Thanmathra	Mohan Sithara			
2007	"Sabarimala Thirumudiyil"	Ente Kannimala	Vidyadharan			
2008	"Jeevitham Oru"	Madampi	M. Jayachandran			
2008	"Ganesha Saranam"	Madampi	M. Jayachandran			
2009	"Theme Song"	Casanovva	Gopi Sundar	Priya Himesh, Ranina Reddy, Gopi Sundar	Narration	
2009	"Annarakanna Vaa"	Bhramaram	Mohan Sithara	Vishnu, Dr. Unnikrishnan		
2010	"Naathoone Naathoone"	Oru Naal Varum	M. G. Sreekumar	Rimi Tomy		
2011	"I'm Your Man"	Pranayam	M. Jayachandran			
2011	"Ayyappa Ponnanikkovilil"	Ayyappathom	M. G. Sreekumar			
2012	"Muthappadevante"	Ente Muthappadevan	C. Rajamani			
2012	"Attumanal Payayil"	Run Baby Run	Ratheesh Vegha			
2014	"Ambalappuzha Unnikannanu"	Ambalappuzha Kannanu Priya Nivedyam	M. G. Sreekumar			
2015	"Pandengandu"	Lalisom - The Lal Effect	Ratheesh Vegha			
2016	"Malayattoor Malayum"	Pulimurugan	Gopi Sundar			
2018	"Azhake Azhake"	Neerali	Stephen Devassy	Shreya Ghoshal		
2018	"Pandaarand"	Drama	Vinu Thomas			
2018	"Enoruvan"	Odiyan	M. Jayachandran			
2019	"Kando Kando"	Ittymaani: Made in China	Deepak Dev	Vaikom Vijayalakshmi		
2022	"Vannu Pokum"	Bro Daddy	Deepak Dev	Prithviraj		
2023	"Kann Kandath Nijam"	Malaikottai Vaaliban	Prashant Pillai		Debut Rap	
2023	"Raakk"	Malaikottai Vaaliban	Prashant Pillai			
2024	"Gloria"	Christmas Song	Jerry Amaldev	Chorus		
2025	"Vyakulamathave"	Christian Devotional Songs	Stephen Devassy	Chorus		
2025	"Aalambamattavarkk"	Christian Devotional Songs	Stephen Devassy	Chorus		

== See also ==
- List of awards and nominations received by Mohanlal
- Mohanlal filmography
