= List of awards and nominations received by K. J. Yesudas =

K. J. Yesudas Awards and Nominations
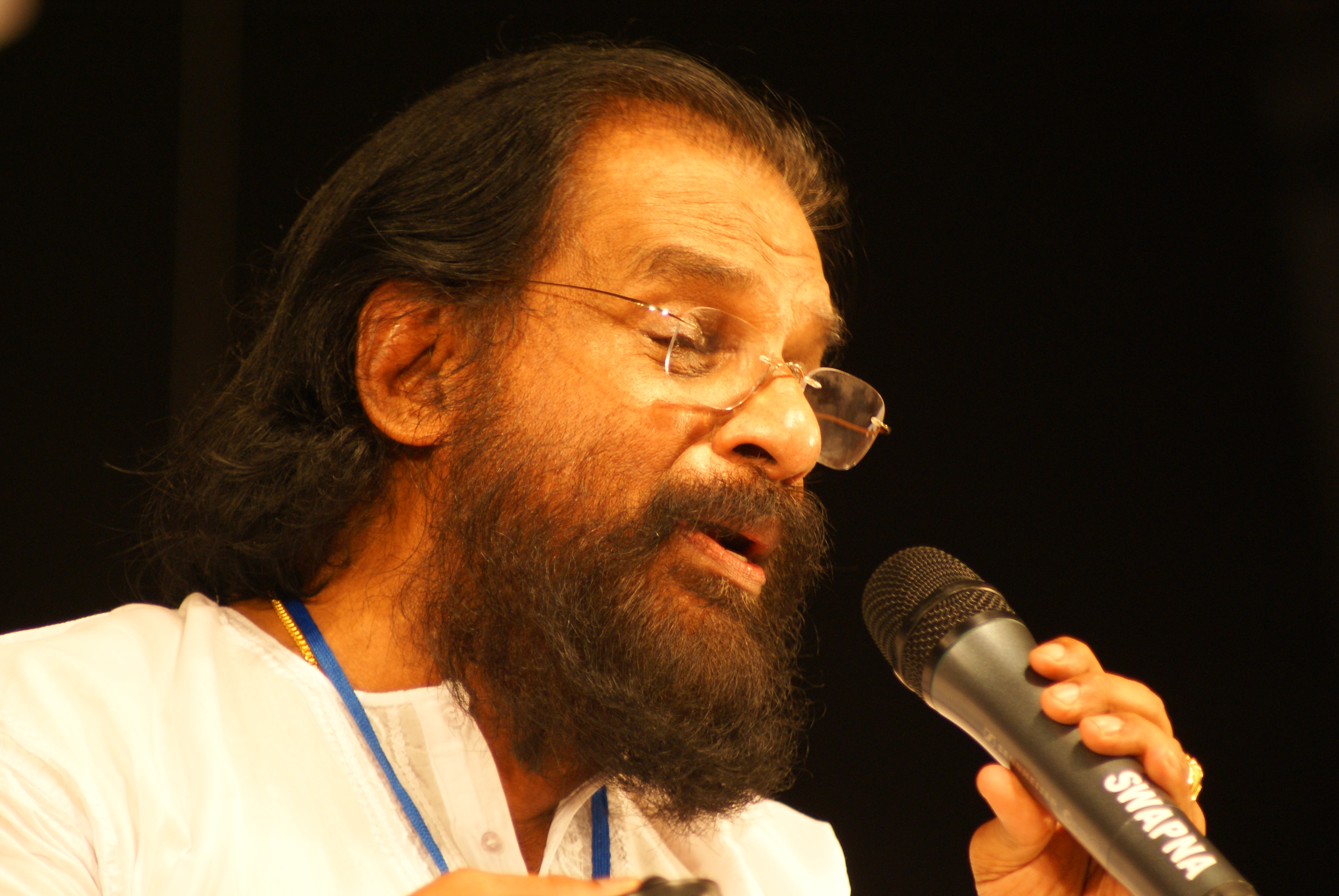
Awards & nominations
Award	Won	Nominated
Amrita TV Film Awards	1	1
Andhra Pradesh State Film Awards	4	4
Asianet Film Awards	2	4
Civilian honours	3	3
CNN IBN Awards	1	1
Filmfare Awards	1	1
Filmfare Awards South	4	5
Honorary Awards	14	14
International Indian Film Academy Awards	1	1
Jaihind TV Film Awards	2	2
Jaycee Foundation Film Award	1	1
Kerala State Film Awards	26	26
Kerala Film Critics Association Awards	19	19
National Film Awards	8	8
South Indian International Movie Awards	1	1
Tamil Nadu State Film Awards	5	5
Karnataka Rajyotsava Award	1	1
Vanitha Film Awards	2	2
West Bengal State Film Awards	1	1
Other awards	22	22
- Total number of wins and nominations
Totals	500+	131

K. J. Yesudas is a multilingual singer, singing Indian classical music, devotional, light music and film songs. His commercially published recordings span multiple genres. This page lists his major awards, honors and titles.

== Titles and honours ==
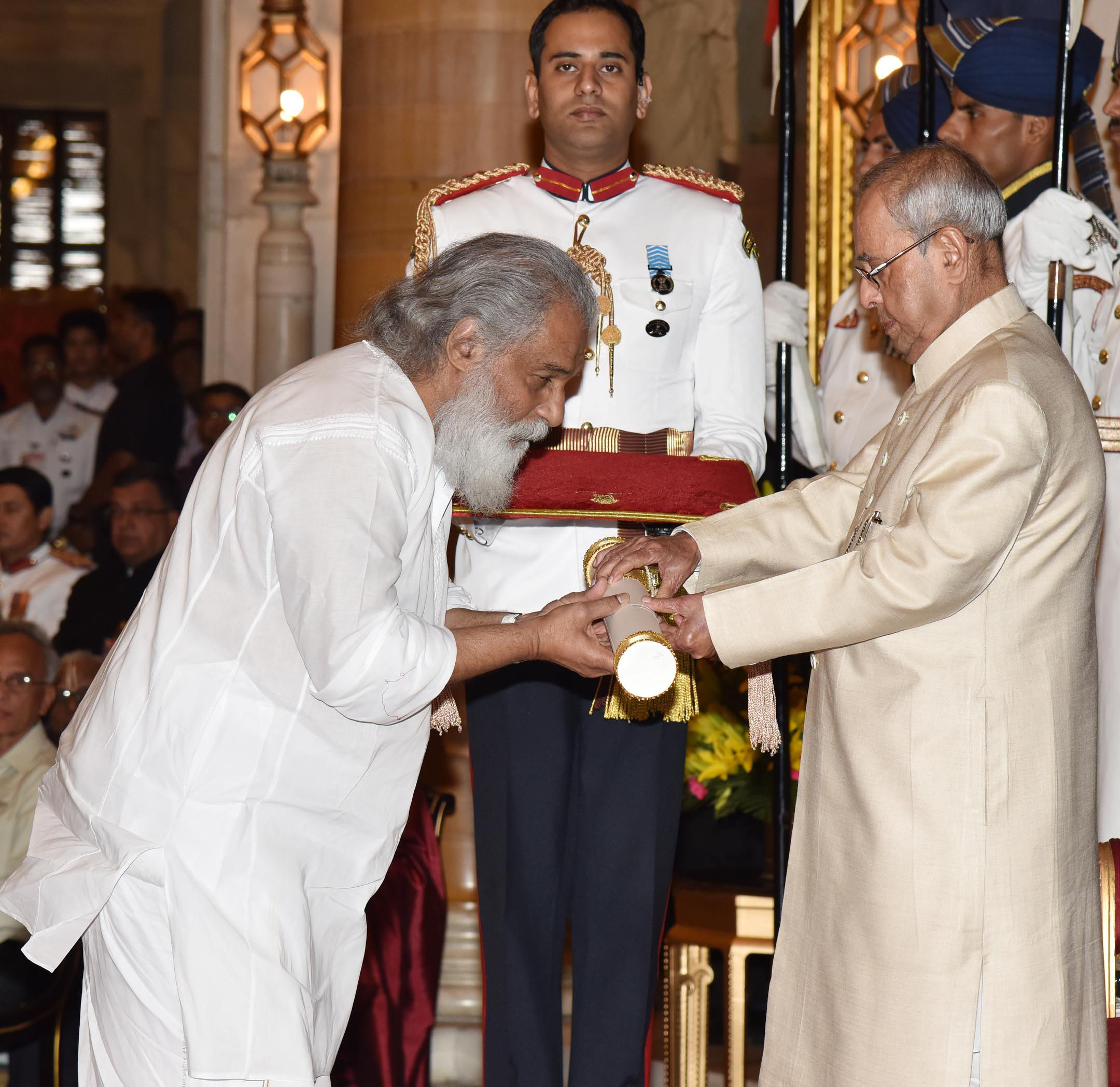
The President, Shri Pranab Mukherjee presenting the Padma Vibhushan Award to Dr. K.J. Yesudas, at the Civil Investiture Ceremony, at Rashtrapati Bhavan, in New Delhi on 13 April 2017

Year	Honour	Honouring body	Ref(s)
1975	Padma Shri	Government of India	
1986	Kalaimamani	Government of Tamil Nadu	
1989	Honorary doctorate (D.Litt)	Annamalai University	
1993	Lata Mangeshkar Award	Government of Madhya Pradesh	
2002	Padma Bhushan	Government of India	
2003	Honorary doctorate (D.Litt)	University of Kerala	
2009	Honorary doctorate (D.Litt)	Mahatma Gandhi University, Kerala	
2010	Swathi Sangeetha Puraskaram	Government of Kerala	
2014	Special honour	Government of Kerala	
2017	Padma Vibhushan	Government of India	
2017	Rajyotsava Prashasti	Government of Karnataka	
2025	M. S. Subbulakshmi Award	Government of Tamil Nadu	

== National Film Award for Best Male Playback Singer ==
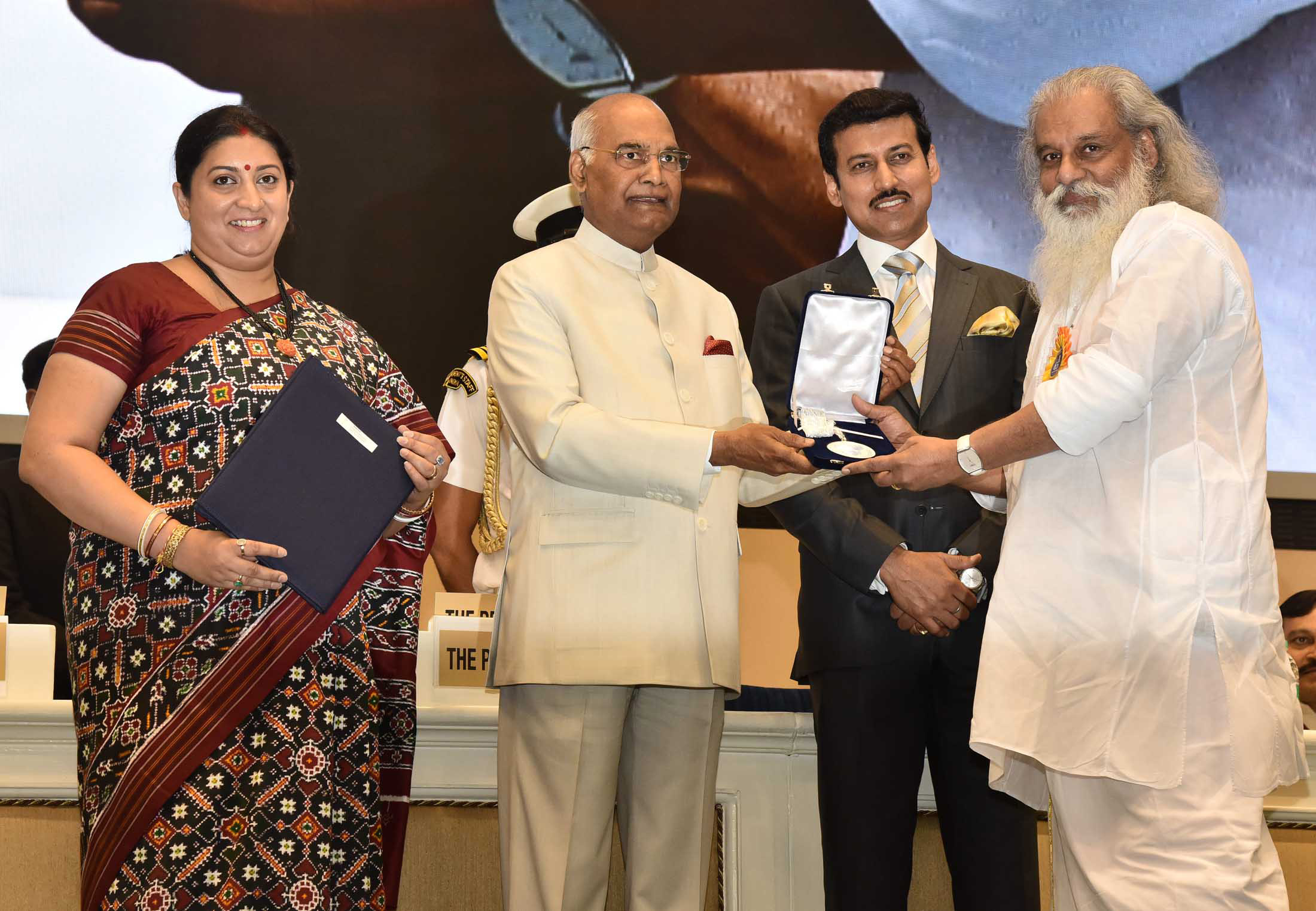
Yesudas receiving his 8th National Film Award from Ram Nath Kovind, the President of India

Holds the record of eight time winner of National Film Award for Best Male Playback Singer, the most by any male playback singer.

Year	Song	Film	Language	Ref(s)
1972	Manushyan Mathangale	Achanum Bappayum	Malayalam	
1973	Padmatheerthame Unaru	Gayathri	Malayalam	
1976	Gori Tera Gaon Bada Pyara	Chitchor	Hindi	
1982	Aakasa Desaana Aashada Maasaana	Meghasandesam	Telugu	
1987	Unnikale Oru Kadha Parayam	Unnikale Oru Kadha Parayam	Malayalam	
1991	Ramakadha Gaanalayam	Bharatham	Malayalam	
1993	Ksheerasaagara Shayana	Sopanam	Malayalam	
2017	Poymaranja Kaalam	Viswasapoorvam Mansoor	Malayalam	

== Kerala State Film Awards ==
Category	Year	Song	Film	Ref
Best Male Playback Singer	1969	Polthinkalkkala	Kumara Sambhavam	
Best Male Playback Singer	1970	Various Songs	Various Films	
Best Male Playback Singer	1971	Various Songs	Various Films	
Best Male Playback Singer	1973	Various Songs	Various Films	
Best Male Playback Singer	1974	Various Songs	Various Films	
Best Male Playback Singer	1975	Various Songs	Various Films	
Best Male Playback Singer	1976	Various Songs	Various Films	
Best Male Playback Singer	1977	Shankara Digvijayam	Jagadguru Aadisankaran	
Best Male Playback Singer	1977	Neela Jalaashayathil	Angeekaaram	
Best Male Playback Singer	1979	Krishna Thulasi	Ulkkadal	
Best Male Playback Singer	1980	Manassoru Maanthrika	Mela	
Best Male Playback Singer	1980	Mizhiyoram	Manjil Virinja Pookkal	
Best Male Playback Singer	1980	Paavaada Venam	Angadi	
Best Male Playback Singer	1981	Various Songs	Various Films	
Best Male Playback Singer	1982	Various Songs	Various Films	
Best Male Playback Singer	1983	Various Songs	Various Films	
Best Male Playback Singer	1984	Ee Marubhoovil	Swantham Sarika	
Best Male Playback Singer	1985	Vachaalamaakum Mounam	Ambada Njaane!	
Best Male Playback Singer	1985	Anuragini Itha En	Oru Kudakeezhil	
Best Male Playback Singer	1986	Neeraaduvaan	Nakhakshathangal	
Best Male Playback Singer	1993	Raappaadi Kezhunnuvo	Aakashadooth	
Best Male Playback Singer	1993	Chandrakantham Kondu	Padheyam	
Best Male Playback Singer	1993	Madhuram Jeevaamrutha	Chenkol	
Best Male Playback Singer	1994	Saamaja Sancharini	Parinayam	
Best Male Playback Singer	1995	Ponnambili Pottumthottu	No. 1 Snehatheeram Bangalore North	
Best Male Playback Singer	1995	Aathmaavin Pusthakathaalil	Mazhayethum Munpe	
Best Male Playback Singer	1995	Japamaay Vedhasaadhakamaay	Punnaram	
Best Male Playback Singer	1996	Kaliveedurangiyallo	Desadanam	
Best Male Playback Singer	1996	Parvathi Manohari	Thooval Kottaram	
Best Male Playback Singer	1997	Harimuraleeravam	Aaraam Thampuran	
Best Male Playback Singer	1998	Etho Nidrathan	Ayal Kadha Ezhuthukayanu	
Best Male Playback Singer	2001	Aakaasha Deepangal	Ravanaprabhu	
J. C. Daniel Award	2002	Lifetime Achievement Award for outstanding contributions to Malayalam Cinema		
Best Male Playback Singer	2009	Swantham Swantham	Madhya Venal	
Best Male Playback Singer	2014	Aadithyakiranangal	White Boys	

== Nandi Awards (Andhra Pradesh State Film Awards) ==
Year	Category	Song	Film	Ref(s)
1982	Best Male Playback Singer	Sigalo Avi Viralo	Meghasandesam	
1988	Best Male Playback Singer	Neeve Namma Jyothi	Jeevana Jyothi	
1990	Best Male Playback Singer	Nagumomu	Alludugaru	
2006	Best Male Playback Singer	Vellipothunnava	Ganga	

== Tamil Nadu State Film Awards ==
Year	Category	Song	Film	Ref(s)
1977	Best Playback Singer	Ninaivaale; Thendralil Aadidum	Andaman Kadhali; Madhuraiyai Meetta Sundharapandiyan	
1982	Best Playback Singer	Kanne Kalimaane	Moondram Pirai	
1988	Best Playback Singer		Various films	
1989	Best Playback Singer	Vaanam Arugil Oru	Nyaya Tharasu	
1992	Best Playback Singer	Amma Endrazhaikatha	Mannan	

== Karnataka State Film Awards ==
Year	Category	Song	Film	Ref(s)
1986	Best Male Playback Singer	Ellellu Sangeethave	Malaya Marutha	
1991	Best Male Playback Singer	Nammoora Yuvarani	Ramachaari	

== Filmfare Awards South ==
Year	Category	Song	Film	Ref(s)
2003	Lifetime Achievement Award			
2006	Best Playback Singer (Malayalam)	Gange	Vadakkumnadhan	
2008	Best Playback Singer (Malayalam)	Amma Mazhakkarinu	Madampi	
2009	Best Playback Singer (Malayalam)	Aadhiyusha Sandhya	Kerala Varma Pazhassi Raja	

== Filmfare Awards ==
Year	Category	Song	Film	Ref(s)
1976	Filmfare Special Award	Gori Tera Gaon	Chitchor	
1980	Best Male Playback Singer	Dilke Tukde	Dada	

== Kerala Film Critics Association Awards ==
K. J. Yesudas won critics awards for various songs from each films.

Category	Year	Film	Ref
Best Male Playback Singer	1977	Various films	
Best Male Playback Singer	1978	Various films	
Best Male Playback Singer	1979	Various films	
Best Male Playback Singer	1980	Various films	
Best Male Playback Singer	1981	Various films	
Best Male Playback Singer	1982	Various films	
Best Male Playback Singer	1983	Various films	
Best Male Playback Singer	1984	Various films	
Best Male Playback Singer	1985	Various films	
Best Male Playback Singer	1986	Various films	
Best Male Playback Singer	1990	Amaram	
Best Male Playback Singer	1991	Bharatham	
Best Male Playback Singer	1992	Kamaladalam, Sargam, Kudumbasametham	
Best Male Playback Singer	1993	Kalippattam, Sarovaram, Chenkol	
Best Male Playback Singer	1994	Various films	
Best Male Playback Singer	1995	Various films	
Best Male Playback Singer	1996	Desadanam, Ee Puzhayum Kadannu, Thooval Kottaram	
Best Male Playback Singer	1997	Kaliyattam, Aaraam Thampuran, Krishnagudiyil Oru Pranayakalathu	
Chalachitra Ratnam Award	1998		

== Vanitha Film Awards ==
Year	Category	Song	Film	Ref(s)
2009	Lifetime Achievement Award			
2009	Best Playback Singer	Aadhiyusha Sandhya	Pazhassi Raja	

== Asianet Film Awards ==
Year	Category	Song	Film	Ref(s)
2000	Best Playback Singer	Karale Nin	Devadoothan	
2008	Lifetime Achievement Award			
2015	Lifetime Achievement Award			

== Other major titles, honours and awards ==
- Ranjakagayakasiromanih (The Crown Jewel among those singers whose music is charming) from TSN's Percussive Arts Centre Inc (TSNPAC), New Jersey in 2022
- Geetanjali citation by the ex-president of India Neelam Sanjiva Reddy
- Star of India and Sangeetha Ratna (Music Jewel) awards by Lt. Governor of Pondicherry, Madan Mohan Lakhera
- Senate member of the Italy-based International Parliament for Safety and Peace
- Gaana Gandharvan by G. Sankara Kurup in 1968
- Sangeetha Raja (Music King) by Chembai in 1974
- Sur Singar Samsad Award in 1976
- Kerala Sangeetha Nataka Akademi Fellowship (Classical music) in 1979
- Sangeetha Chakravarthy (Music Emperor) by Pallavi Narasimachary in 1988
- Sangeetha Sagaram (Music Ocean) in 1989
- Asthana Gayakan (Official Singer) by Government of Kerala and Kerala Sangeetha Nataka Akademi in 1992
- Sangeet Natak Akademi Award in 1992
- Star of Cochin award in 1992
- National Citizens Award presented by Mother Teresa in 1994
- An Honorary award for Outstanding Achievements in Music and Peace by UNESCO in 1999
- Dr. Pinnamaneni and Seethadevi Foundation Award in 2000
- Bhakti Sangeetha Sironmani in 2002
- Sangeetha Kala Sudhakara by Vidyadheesha Teertha of Udupi Sri Krishna Temple in 2002
- Swathi Ratnam (Swathi Jewel) by The Malayalee Club, Chennai in 2002
- Asthana Vidwan (Official Teacher) by Udupi, Sringeri, and Raghavendra mutts in 2002
- Sapthagiri Sangeetha Vidwanmani by Sri Thyagaraja Swamy Vari Temple Etc., Building Trust in 2002
- Ranjini Sangeeta Kala Rathna Award by Sri Ranjini Trust, Chennai in 2002
- Sangeetha Kalasikhamani by The Indian Fine Arts Society, Chennai in 2002
- Korambayil Ahammed Haji Foundation Award in 2003
- Wisdom International Award in 2005
- Ghantasala Melody King Award in 2005.
- Mar Gregorius Award by Governor RL Bhatia in 2006
- Kannada Chithra Sahitya Rathna Sri.Udayashankar Memorial Film Award - Lifetime Achievement Award in 2007
- Kerala Ratna by Jaihind TV in 2008
- Honorary Membership by the Vancouver Symphony Orchestra in 2008
- Sathyan Memorial Film Award for Lifetime Achievement in 2009
- Susheela National Music Award in 2009
- Jaycee Foundation Film Award for Best Singer in 2009
- Social Excellence Award in 2010
- Mirchi Awards for Best Singer and Lifetime Achievement in 2010
- Sree Chithira Thirunal National Award in 2010
- Swaralaya – Eenam Award in 2010 – Decade's Best Talent in Malayalam Music
- Symphony TV Lifetime Achievement Award in 2010
- Jaihind TV Film Award 2010 for Best Male Playback Singer Award for the song Pinne Ennodonnum from the movie Shikkar.
- Amrita-FEFKA Lifetime Achievement Award in 2011.
- Swaralaya - Devarajan Master Award in 2011.
- CNN-IBN Indian of the Year Award in 2011
- M. K. Raghavan Vakkeel Award, instituted by Sree Narayana Sangam in memory of M. K. Raghavan, former Labour Minister and S. N. Trust General Secretary, in 2012.
- Limca Book of Records' People of the Year Award in 2012
- Harivarasanam Award, instituted by Travancore Devaswom Board in 2012
- Dharmashree award by Dharmashree Foundation, Eshwaramangala in 2012
- P. Bhaskaran Puraskaram by P. Bhaskaran Foundation in 2013
- SIIMA Lifetime Achievement Award in 2013
- Dynamic Man of the Millennium Award by K. G. Foundation in 2013
- Harmony Award by Marthoma Research Academy in 2013.
- SKGS Thyagaraja Seva Rathna Award in 2014
- Padmabhushan B. Sarojadevi National Award by Bharathiya Vidya Bhavan in 2015
- Mazhavil Mango Music Lifetime Achievement Award in 2017
- Sangeetha Kalasarathy award by Sri Parthasarathy Swami Sabha in 2017
- Ambassador of Peace honor by Gandhi Foundation USA in 2017
- Flowers Music Awards' Lifetime Achievement Award in 2018
- All-time Entertainer Award by Mazhavil Manorama in 2019
- Deshabhimani Award in 2019
- C. R. Kesavan Vaidyar Award in 2019
- Outstanding Contribution in Music Industry honour by DPIFF in 2024
