= Harikrishnans =

1998 Indian film

- Poster
- Directed by: Fazil
- Written by: Fazil
- Dialogues by: Madhu Muttam
- Produced by: Suchitra Mohanlal
- Starring: Mammootty; Mohanlal; Juhi Chawla; Kunchacko Boban; Innocent
- Cinematography: Anandakuttan
- Edited by: T. R. Shekar; K. R. Gaurishankar
- Music by: Ouseppachan
- Production company: Pranavam Arts
- Distributed by: Pranavam Arts
- Release date: 4 September 1998
- Running time: 172 minutes
- Country: India
- Language: Malayalam
- Budget: ₹2.5 crore

Harikrishnans is a 1998 Indian Malayalam-language mystery buddy comedy film written and directed by Fazil. The film was produced and distributed by Suchitra Mohanlal under the production company Pranavam Arts, starring Mammootty and Mohanlal in the title roles. Juhi Chawla, Innocent, Shamili, Nedumudi Venu, Cochin Haneefa, Jagadish, Maniyanpilla Raju and Kunchacko Boban play the supporting cast. The film received a great pre-release hype due to the combined screen presence of Mammootty and Mohanlal after 8 years. It was released theatrically on 4 September 1998, coinciding with Onam, to critical acclaim and emerged as a commercial success. It was the highest-grossing Malayalam film of the year. It was later dubbed into Tamil with the same name.

The film initially had two endings when released, where the heroine chose Mammootty in one version and Mohanlal in the other one. This was an attempt by the filmmakers to satisfy the fanbases of both Mammootty and Mohanlal, who were each popular in different regions of Kerala. However, only one version was submitted to the Central Board of Film Certification (CBFC) for censorship approval. The producers were embroiled in legal actions after that, but the gimmick helped the film to bring in millions of rupees. This was an upturn for the Malayalam film industry, which had been generating unsuccessful films for quite some time.

== Plot ==
The Harikrishnans are one of the most famous lawyer duo in India. They head the organization called Harikrishnan Associates, which consists of around 300 lawyers. They get engaged in a murder case of Guptan, who was allegedly killed by a hearing and speech impaired woodcutter, Gabriel. Gabriel is a friend of Hari's sister and Harikrishnans become the defence lawyers upon her request.

The Harikrishnans begin an investigation and come across Meera, a friend of Guptan. Both of them fall in love with her. After some trouble over the matter, they rediscover their friendship and get involved in the case again. They discover that Guptan actually died due to poisoning by his relatives who were doctors who wanted to amass his wealth. The culprits are captured and Guptan's elderly father accepts Sudarshanan, a former student of Guptan, as his son and successor to the property.

In the end, Meera opts for a random method to choose her life partner, as she is equally fond of both Harikrishnans. She decides to toss a leaf, with the name it lands on being designated as her friend, who would then choose who should marry her. The leaf lands on Hari's name, and it is presumed that she makes him her friend. It is likely that Hari would suggest Krishnan as the one to marry her.

=== Alternate ending ===
In the uncensored cut of the film, the leaf lands on Krishnan's name, and it is presumed that she makes him her friend. It is likely that Krishnan would suggest Hari as the one to marry her.

There was another ending planned with Shah Rukh Khan. He was proposed to do the role of the lover of Meera. But due to some technical problems it was cancelled.

== Cast ==
- Mammootty as Hari
- Mohanlal as Krishnan
- Juhi Chawla as Meera (voiced by Sreeja Ravi)
- Kunchako Boban as Sudarshanan
- Innocent as Adv. Sundaresan
- Nedumudi Venu as Thampuran (Thirumanassu), Guptan's elderly father
- Baby Shamili as Ammalu, Hari's younger sister and Krishnan's cousin
- Rajiv Menon as Guptan, Meera's friend
- Cochin Haneefa as Kunjikuttan, Meera's cousin
- V. K. Sreeraman as Gabriel, who is both deaf and dumb (gets implicated in Guptan's murder)
- Krishna as Pavi, Sudarshanan's friend
- Sudheesh as Sudarshanan's Friend
- Poojappura Ravi as Ramabhadran [Ramappan], Thampuran's sinister younger cousin
- Venu Nagavalli as Kallurkaatil Vishwambharan, Meera's father
- Jagadish as Public Prosecutor Appukuttan Nair
- Maniyanpilla Raju as Kunjikuttan's Advocate
- Hemanth Ravan as Dr Jaya Kumar, Ramappan's elder son and Guptan's cousin (who murdered Guptan)
- Baburaj as Prem Kumar, Ramappan's younger son and Guptan's cousin (who murdered Guptan)
- Reena as Sharadha, Meera's mother
- Sajitha Betti as Ammalu's friend, Nisha
- Saranya Mohan as Ammalu's Friend
- Kanakalatha as Ammalu's neighbour
- Sankaradi as Kunjikelu
- Krishna Prasad as Sudarshanan's friend
- K.P.A.C. Sunny as Judge
- V.P. Ramachandran as Ammalu's neighbour
- Augustine as Sasi, Kunjikuttan's driver
- K. P. Ummer as Sudarshanan's Hostel Warden
- Yadu Krishnan as Sudarshanan's friend
- Jereesh James as Sudarshanan's friend
- Vijayan Peringode as Temple Poojaari at Kovilakkam
- Jose Pellissery as Jose-paapa, the guard at Ammalu's neighbourhood in Ponoor
- Antony Perumbavoor as Ambulance driver Antony

== Soundtrack ==
Harikrishnans

Soundtrack album by Ouseppachan
- Released: 1998
- Studio: VGP Digital, Chennai
- Genre: Soundtrack
- Label: Johny Sagariga
- Producer: Ouseppachan

All lyrics are written by Kaithapram Damodaran Namboothiri; all music is composed by Ouseppachan.

No.	Title	Artist(s)	Length
1.	"Ponnambal Puzhayirampil"	K. J. Yesudas, K. S. Chithra
2.	"Ponne Ponnambili"	K. J. Yesudas
3.	"Pooja Bimbam"	K. J. Yesudas, K. S. Chithra
4.	"Ponnambal Puzhayirampil"	K. S. Chithra
5.	"Samayamithapoorva"	M. G. Sreekumar, K. S. Chithra
6.	"Minnal Kaivala"	Sujatha Mohan
7.	"Minnal Kaivala" (Violin Solo)	Ouseppachan
8.	"Samayamithapoorva"	K. J. Yesudas

K. J. Yesudas sang his parts in two different voices, to simulate the singing of both the lead actors during the song sequences in the film.

== Release ==
Harikrishnans had multiple climaxes to appease the fan base of the lead actors Mammootty and Mohanlal. This created a spark of controversy among the fans. The scene was when Meera (Juhi Chawla) chooses one of them to be her friend among both the Harikrishnans. She admires both equally and goes for a selection method which her grandmother taught her, whenever she had to make tough decisions. She sets the method so as to choose her friend; the loser of the toss presumably becoming Mira's life partner. One of the climax shots shows Hari (Mammootty) winning the toss and the other one Krishnan (Mohanlal) winning it.

=== Critical reception ===
Jayalakshmi K. of Deccan Herald wrote "Perhaps if Fazil had decided what he wanted, a love story or a murder case, the movie might have fared better." Padmanabha Venugopal of Indian Express wrote "Though it is entertaining, the movie doesn't have the support of a good script. Though the presence of two big-wigs and the controversy over the ending all made it spin money, artistically the movie suffered". D. S. Ramanujam of The Hindu called it "another fine example of director Fazil's directorial acumen" and added that the two lead actors "are in the thick of the drama right through and share the acting honours with their elegant performances".

=== Box office ===
The film's budget was ₹2.5 crore (US$260,000) and recovered its cost within two weeks. The film collected ₹5.6 lakh (US$5,900) from first week beating the previous record of Aaraam Thampuran, which was ₹4 lakh (US$4,200). The film was a commercial success and the highest grosser of the year.
