= Rasigan Oru Rasigai =

- Poster
- Directed by: Balu Anand
- Written by: Balu Anand
- Produced by: C. Kalavathy; K. Revathirajan
- Starring: Sathyaraj; Ambika
- Cinematography: Prabhakar
- Edited by: Devan
- Music by: Raveendran
- Production company: Vassan Productions
- Release date: 21 February 1986
- Running time: 137 minutes
- Country: India
- Language: Tamil

Rasigan Oru Rasigai (transl. Male fan, a female fan) is a 1986 Indian Tamil-language film directed by Balu Anand and starring Sathyaraj and Ambika. It was released on 21 February 1986.

== Plot ==
Latha, played by Ambika, is a famous Carnatic singer who dislikes superficial admiration. Balu, played by Sathyaraj, is deeply in love with her and speaks to her over the phone for nearly five years using the false name “R.K.” Latha enjoys these conversations because, unlike ordinary fans, he gives genuine criticism and understands her music deeply.

Meanwhile, Gopal, a petty thief living with his close group of friends, possesses a naturally gifted singing voice despite having no formal musical knowledge. When Latha hears him sing, she is impressed by his talent and decides to train him in Carnatic music and help him succeed in life. Initially reluctant to leave his friends, Gopal eventually agrees after they encourage him to pursue a better future. Under Latha’s guidance, he becomes a successful stage singer admired by audiences everywhere.

Years earlier, Latha and Balu had been engaged, but she cancelled the marriage after Balu tried to cross her boundaries before marriage. Though hurt, Balu continues to wait for her and remains emotionally attached to her through the identity of R.K.

As Gopal’s fame grows, rumours spread about his relationship with Latha. A reporter speaks disrespectfully about them to R.K., causing Balu to assault him in anger. At the same time, Latha’s father begins suspecting a relationship between Latha and Gopal. To protect her honour, Gopal falsely claims that Latha trained him because she intended to marry him, though in reality she only treated him like a brother. When Balu hears this, he attacks Gopal and insults him for claiming closeness to Latha.

Eventually, Latha decides to accept Balu and goes to R.K.’s office, only to learn that he has already left for Kolkata. Soon afterward, a newspaper falsely reports that Latha has married Gopalakrishnan. Believing the rumour, both Balu and Ramya’s father separately arrange to kill Gopal. Later, realizing the report was false, they rush to save him. Gopal escapes with a gunshot wound to his hand, the misunderstandings are cleared, and finally Balu invites everyone to his marriage with Latha.

== Cast ==
- Sathyaraj
- Ambika
- Goundamani
- T. S. Raghavender
- Senthil
- Suryakanth
- Chinni Jayanth
- Ramesh
- Jaishankar

== Production ==
Sathyaraj, who played villainous roles in many films, made his debut as a hero with this film. He plays a fan of a singer played by Ambika. A scene was shot at Kottarakkara bungalow at Mahalingapuram.

== Soundtrack ==
The music was composed by Raveendran. He was chosen as the composer after Ambika was listening to one of his compositions on her Walkman, catching the attention of Balu Anand. The song "Yezhisai Geethame" was adapted from Raveendran's own composition "Ezhu Swarangalum" from the Malayalam film Chiriyo Chiri (1982) while "Paadi Azhaithen" was adapted from his other composition "Thenum Vayambum" from the Malayalam film Thenum Vayambum (1981).

Track listing
No.	Title	Lyrics	Singer(s)	Length
1.	"Yezhisai Geethame"	Vaali	K. J. Yesudas
2.	"Velli Mooku Minna Minna"	Vaali	K. J. Yesudas, S. Janaki
3.	"Amma Adi Amma"	Na. Kamarasan	P. Jayachandran, S. Janaki
4.	"Paadi Azhaithen Unnai"	Pulavar Pulamaipithan	K. J. Yesudas
5.	"Yezhisai Geethamea {Female}"	Vaali	S. Janaki
6.	"Nadu Nalla Nadu"	Gangai Amaran	Malaysia Vasudevan
7.	"Unakkakavea Naan Uyir"	M. G. Vallabhan	S. Janaki
8.	"Katrinile Varum Geetham"	Vaali	Vani Jairam

== Release and reception ==
Rasigan Oru Rasigai was released on 21 February 1986. Kalki lauded Sathyaraj's performance and said Raveendran's music was the soul of the film. The film was a box office success.
