= Megham =

- VCD cover
- Directed by: Priyadarshan
- Screenplay by: T. Damodaran
- Story by: Priyadarshan
- Produced by: Suresh Balaje
- Starring: Mammootty; Dileep; Sreenivasan; Priya Gill; K. P. A. C. Lalitha; Pooja Batra; Nedumudi Venu; Cochin Haneefa; Captain Raju
- Cinematography: Sanjeev Sankar
- Edited by: N. Gopalakrishnan
- Music by: Ouseppachan
- Production company: Sitara Combines
- Distributed by: Pranavam Movies (P) Ltd
- Release date: 15 April 1999
- Running time: 138 minutes
- Country: India
- Language: Malayalam

Megham (transl. Cloud) is a 1999 Indian Malayalam-language comedy-drama film directed by Priyadarshan, written by T. Damodaran, produced by Suresh Balaje and distributed by Mohanlal through Pranavam Movies. It stars Mammootty, Dileep, Priya Gill, Pooja Batra, K. P. A. C. Lalitha, Sreenivasan, Nedumudi Venu, Captain Raju and Cochin Haneefa. The music was composed by Ouseppachan.

== Plot ==
Col. Ravi Varma Thampuran decides to go on leave for two months and travel alone to avoid depression after his wife leaves him. During his journey, he visits the home village of his subordinate, Manikandan, where he unexpectedly finds himself falling in love with Meenakshi. Consequently, he grants a divorce to his wife. However, he later discovers that Meenakshi is already engaged to Mani. Frustrated and angry, he initially directs his anger towards Manikandan. However, a visit from his estranged wife prompts him to reflect on his actions and acknowledge his mistakes. He then resolves to bring Meenakshi and Manikandan together, despite facing opposition from both families. To accomplish this, he stages Meenakshi's fake suicide. In the final scene, Col. Ravi Varma Thampuran is seen leaving, accompanied by the police, indicating that he is likely facing court-martial for preventing Manikandan from joining the troops at the war front earlier.

== Cast ==
- Mammootty as Colonel Ravi Varma "R.V." Thampuran / Kelan
- Dileep as Sepoy O. Manikandan Nair / Mani
- Sreenivasan as Shanmugham
- Priya Gill as Meenakshi (Voiced by Bhagyalakshmi)
- Pooja Batra as Swathy (Voiced by Revathy)
- K. P. A. C. Lalitha as Aachamma, Mani and Meenakshi's grandmother
- Mamukkoya as Kurup, Ravi's assistant and helper
- Nedumudi Venu as Kumaran, Meenakshi's father
- Cochin Haneefa as Kunjikuttan, Kumaran's youngest brother
- T. R. Omana as Ravi's mother
- Manka Mahesh as Aachamma's daughter and Manikandan's mother
- Venu Nagavally as Colonel Sunny, Ravi's Friend
- Major Ravi as Major Kumar
- Kalabhavan Satheesh as Pottan, Shanmugham's henchman
- James Stalin as Ayyappan, Kumaran's younger brother
- Sindhu as Manikandan's sister
- Ajayan Adoor as Govindan Kutty, Manikandan's brother-in-law
- Captain Raju as Brigadier, Swathy's father
- Augustine as Govindan Nair (cameo)
- Vijayan Peringode as Panchayat President (cameo)
- Archived footages of Rajinikanth and Shobhana are also used

== Songs ==
All lyrics are written by Gireesh Puthenchery; all music is composed by Ouseppachan. The song "Njanoru Pattu Paadam" is based on "Aye Meri Zohra Jabeen" from Waqt.

No.	Title	Artist(s)	Length
1.	"Manjukaalam Nolkkum"	K. J. Yesudas, Sujatha Mohan
2.	"Vilakku Vakkum"	M. G. Sreekumar
3.	"Vilakku Vakkum" (Instrumental)	Ouseppachan
4.	"Thumbayum Thulasiyum" (Male)	M. G. Sreekumar
5.	"Thumbayum Thulasiyum" (Female)	K. S. Chithra
6.	"Margazhiye Mallikaye"	M. G. Sreekumar, Srinivas, K. S. Chithra
7.	"Njanoru Pattu Paadam"	K. J. Yesudas

== Reception ==
The Times of India wrote, "This Mammootty starrer is amusing, in its true sense."
