= Pingami =

1994 film directed by Sathyan Anthikkad

- Theatrical release poster
- Directed by: Sathyan Anthikkad
- Written by: Reghunath Paleri
- Produced by: Mohanlal
- Starring: Mohanlal; Puneet Issar; Jagathy Sreekumar; Thilakan; Innocent; Kanaka; Sukumaran; Janardhanan; Oduvil Unnikrishnan; Shanthi Krishna
- Cinematography: Vipin Mohan
- Edited by: K. Rajagopal
- Music by: Johnson
- Production company: Pranavam Arts
- Distributed by: Anupama Films
- Release date: 27 May 1994
- Running time: 160 minutes
- Country: India
- Language: Malayalam

Pingami (Successor) is a 1994 Indian Malayalam-language action thriller film directed by Sathyan Anthikkad and written by Reghunath Paleri based on his own short story Kumarettan Parayaatha Kadha. It was produced by Mohanlal through the company Pranavam Arts, and stars himself along with Puneet Issar, Jagathy Sreekumar, Thilakan, Innocent, Kanaka, Sukumaran, Janardhanan Oduvil Unnikrishnan and Shanthi Krishna in supporting roles. The film follows the story of Captain Vijay, an army officer who forms a close bond with Kumaran, a severely injured man. However, when he dies, Vijay decides to investigate the cause of his death.

The music was composed by Johnson. The film was released on 27 May 1994 and was an average success at the box office. In a retrospective review in 2019, Kerala Kaumudi described Pingami as one of the most underrated films ever in Malayalam cinema. and over the years, the film has attained a cult following.

== Plot ==
Captain Vijay Menon is an orphaned army officer, who returns on his annual leave to stay with his maternal aunt and uncle, who raised him and his younger sister after the untimely deaths of their parents and younger sister. One day, Vijay sees a social worker named Kumaran lying on the road after an accident and moaning for help. He takes Kumaran to a hospital, but is unable to save his life. Vijay finds out that Kumaran's accident was actually a pre-planned murder. With the help of his friend Kutti Hassan, he starts on a trail to find out the mystery behind the murder and in the midst, he finds out the missing links of his own life.

It is revealed that Kumaran was murdered by the same people who had killed Vijay's father, an honest forest range officer who apprehended smuggling of timber. Vijay's father's murder was witnessed by Kumaran, who tried to find justice for Vijay's family. This revelation prompts Vijay to seek vengeance on his father's killers in his own ways, while simultaneously falling in love with Kumaran's daughter Sridevi. Through Kumaran's diary and his own investigations, Vijay finds out that his mother and sister aren't dead, as Kumaran had rescued them and admitted his sister and mother in a charity home where he regularly visited them. Vijay is able to reunite with his family and successfully finishes Kumaran's and his mission for justice.

== Cast ==
- Mohanlal as Captain Vijay Menon, an Indian Army officer
- Puneet Issar as Edwin Thomas / Achayan (voiceover by Prof. Aliyar) (The Main Antagonist)
- Jagathy Sreekumar as Kutti Hassan
- Innocent as Advocate Iyengar
- Thilakan as Illipanath Narayanan Kumaran / Kumarettan
- Kanaka as Sridevi, Kumaran's daughter
- Sukumaran as George Mathews / George Achayan, an influential politician
- Janardhanan as Retd SP Koshy Varghese IPS
- Devan as Shekharankutty Menon, Vijay's father, a government officer
- Shanthi Krishna as Subhadra, Shekharankutty Menon's wife and Vijay's mother
- Seetha as Parvathi, Vijay's younger sister
- Vinduja Menon as Ganga / Mary / Chinnumol, Vijay's youngest sister
- Oduvil Unnikrishnan as Krishnankutty, Vijay's maternal uncle
- Meena as Menon's wife and Vijay's aunt
- Kuthiravattam Pappu as Achuthan
- Sankaradi as Muthappan
- Mala Aravindan as Velichappadu
- Kunchan as Auto driver Khader Kutty
- Paravoor Bharathan as Advocate Bhargavan
- T. P. Madhavan as Shekharan Kurup, Newspaper editor
- V. K. Sreeraman as SI Babu, Station in charge officer
- Poornam Viswanathan as Varma, a retired Revenue Intelligence officer
- Sadiq as Sudheer Kumar, Studio owner
- Ottapalam Pappan
- Santhakumari as Ramani, Kumarettan's wife and Sridevi's mother
- Meena Ganesh as Raziya, Kuttyhasan's mother
- Santha Devi Sree Devi`s mother
- Abu Salim as Muthu, George Achayan's right hand
- Bindu Varappuzha as Rukhiya
- Antony Perumbavoor as Car driver Alexi

== Production ==
Pingami was based on Raghunath Paleri's short story Kumarettan Parayatha Katha. He also wrote the screenplay. Sathyan Anthikkad made a genre change with Pingami who was usually known for making comical family dramas.

== Music ==
Pingami

Soundtrack album by Johnson
- Genre: Film
- Language: Malayalam

The film features songs composed by Johnson and written by Kaithapram.

Track	Song title	Singer(s)
1	"Themmaadikkaatte Ninnaatte"	K. J. Yesudas, M. G. Sreekumar
2	"Vennilavo"	K. S. Chithra

== Release ==
The film was released on 27 May 1994.

== Reception ==
=== Box office ===
It was an average success at the box office.

=== Critical response ===
Upon release the film received mixed reviews. However, modern reception has been more positive.
