= Ramakadha =

Song by Dr. K. J. Yesudas

from the album Bharatham
- Language: Malayalam
- Released: March 29, 1991
- Recorded: 1991
- Studio: Studio27, Chennai, India
- Genre: Semi-classical music
- Length: 5:20
- Label: Tharangini
- Composer(s): Raveendran
- Lyricist(s): Kaithapram
- Producer(s): Pranavam Arts

Music video
- "Ramakadha" on YouTube

"Ramakadha" (Malayalam: രാമകഥാ) is a song composed by Raveendran as a part of the soundtrack for the 1991 Malayalam film Bharatham. This song, composed in Shubhapantuvarali raga, which is one of the most famous compositions in the raga in South India which had the lyrics penned by Kaithapram. The song was sung by K. J. Yesudas. This song was picturised on Mohanlal in the climax of the film. Yesudas won his 6th National Film Award for Best Male Playback Singer and Raveendran won National Film Award Special Mention and Kerala State Film Award for Best Music Director for this song. In the song sequence Mohanlal portrayed the inner conflicts of his character Gopinathan, who is forced to conceal the truth of his brother's death because of their vocally disabled sister's marriage.

== Style ==
Ramakatha is composed using the raga Shubhapantuvarali and Khadakangi. Raveendran has used Violin and Mridangam, Veena, Flute, Thakil and Nadaswaram as the background instruments for the song. Apart from pulling off the most difficult alap portions with ease, Yesudas also conveys the anguish of the protagonist stuck in a terrible dilemma and guilt. His rendition, imbued with classical nuances and emotional depth, showcases his mastery over different genres of music.

== Accolades ==
- National Film Award for Best Male Playback Singer - K. J. Yesudas
- National Film Award Special Mention - Raveendran
- Kerala State Film Award for Best Music Director - Raveendran
