= Thenum Vayambum =

- Soundtrack cover
- Directed by: Ashok Kumar
- Written by: John Paul
- Produced by: Kuruvila Kayyalakkakam
- Starring: Nedumudi Venu; Prem Nazir; Sumalatha; Mohanlal; Rani Padmini
- Cinematography: S. Kumar
- Edited by: K. Sankunny
- Music by: Raveendran
- Production company: Premier Enterprises
- Distributed by: Geo Pictures
- Release date: 17 November 1981
- Running time: 152 minutes
- Country: India
- Language: Malayalam

Thenum Vayambum (transl. Honey and Calamus) is a 1981 Indian Malayalam-language film directed by Ashok Kumar (in his directorial debut) written by John Paul, starring Nedumudi Venu, Prem Nazir and Sumalatha, along with Mohanlal and Ranipadmini. The film features music composed by Raveendran.

== Cast ==
- Nedumudi Venu as Ravi
- Prem Nazir as V. C. Menon
- Sumalatha as Sreedevi
- Mohanlal as Varma
- Khaja Sharif as Sunil
- Ranipadmini as Asha Nair
- Poojappura Ravi as Laundryman
- Sankaradi as Warrier
- Sukumari as Varma's mother
- Balachandra Menon as Babu Mathew
- Alummoodan as Khader Ikka
- C. I. Paul as School Principal
- Santhakumari as Mary Thomas
- Maya as Mrs. Menon

== Soundtrack ==
Thenum Vayambum

Soundtrack album by Raveendran
- Released: 17 November 1981
- Recorded: 1981, Chennai
- Genre: World Music
- Length: 22:04
- Label: Saregama
- Producer: Raveendran

Raveendran chronology
Thaaraattu (1981)	Thenum Vayambum (1981)	Chiriyo Ciri (1982)

The soundtrack for the film was composed by Raveendran with lyrics written by Bichu Thirumala.

Track list
No.	Title	Singer(s)	Length
1.	"Thenum Vayambum"	K. J. Yesudas	4:39
2.	"Thenum Vayambum"	S. Janaki	4:39
3.	"Manassoru Kovil"	K. J. Yesudas	3:51
4.	"Ottakambi Naadam"	K. J. Yesudas	4:32
5.	"Vaanil Paayum"	Unni Menon, Jency Anthony	4:23
Total length:			22:04
