= Raveendran =

Indian composer

Raveendran Master
- Raveendran Master

Background information
- Also known as: Raveendran Master, Kulathupuzha Ravi
- Born: M. Raveendran; 9 November 1943; Kulathupuzha, Travancore, British India
- Origin: Kulathupuzha, Kollam, Kerala
- Died: 3 March 2005 (aged 61) Chennai, Tamil Nadu
- Genres: Carnatic music, Hindustani classical, Malayalam music, World music
- Occupations: Film composer, music director, BGM composer, singer
- Instruments: Harmonium, vocals
- Years active: 1979–2005

Madhavan Raveendran (born Kulathupuzha, Kollam, 9 November 1943 – died Chennai, Tamil Nadu, 3 March 2005), also known as Raveendran Master, was a South Indian music composer and playback singer from Kerala. He composed songs for more than 150 films primarily for the Malayalam and Tamil film industries. He also composed a few albums, including Vasantha Geethangal, Ponnonatharangini and Rithugeethangal. Raveendran composed melodies based on Hindustani Ragas also.

== Early life ==
Raveendran was born on 9 November 1943, in Kulathupuzha, a small village in the present-day Kollam district. He was the seventh child (of nine children) of the late Madhavan and the late Lakshmi. His early life was filled with poverty, and he tried hard to complete his education. After his school days, he went to Swathi Thirunal Music College in Thiruvananthapuram, where he met K. J. Yesudas, and soon began a great friendship. Later, he went to Chennai (Then Madras) to fulfill his wish to be a playback singer. He then changed his name as Kulathupuzha Ravi.

== Musical career ==
He began his career as a playback singer with the song "Parvanarajanithan" from a Malayalam film, Velliyazhcha. He then became a master and associated with many Malayalam composers. He also dubbed voices for films during this time.

The great playback singer K. J. Yesudas, a former classmate, altered the course of Raveendran's life by persuading him to compose songs and thus he became a music director. Raveendran is widely regarded in musical circles as one of the greatest composers in the history of Indian film music.

Director J. Sasikumar, commissioned Raveendran to compose the music for Choola (1979). The song "Tharake Mizhiyithalil Kannerumayi ...", sung by Yesudas, became a hit. Ever since, Raveendran led Malayalam film music with several hit songs.

Melody incorporated with the aspects of Carnatic music were the hallmark of his songs. He successfully composed melodies based on Hindustani ragas also. In 1981 he composed songs and background score for the movie Thenum Vayambum directed by Asok kumar. All songs including "Thenum vayambum", "Ottakkambi nadham" and "Manasoru kovil" became superhits. With the release of Thenum Vayambum (1981), Raveendran made his mark in the film field. In the same year he composed music and background score for the movie Chiriyo Chiri directed by Balachandramenon. The song "Ezhu swarangalum" from the movie Chiriyo Chiri is considered as a pathbreaking semi classical song in Malayalam. In 1982, for his close friend, director P. Venu he dubbed for actor Shankar in his film Aranjyanam and later composed music for his movie Thacholi Thankappan.

A few of Raveendran's best songs were in films like Thenum Vayambum, Chiriyo Chiri, Sukhamo Devi, Aattakalasam, Yuvajanotsavam, Amaram, His Highness Abdullah, Kamaladalam, Kizhakkunarum Pakshi, Champakulam Thachan, Dhanam, Aayirappara, Kalippattam, Ayal Kadha Ezhuthukayanu, Nandanam, Rajashilpi, Bharatham and Aaraam Thampuran. The songs "Pramadhavanam Veendum" from the movie His Highness Abdullah and "Harimuraleeravam" from Aaraam Thampuran were among the most adored songs of that time. He shared a close relationship with the actor Mohanlal. He also composed songs and background score for 8 Tamil films like Hemavin kadhalargal, Rasigan Oru Rasigai, Kanmaniye pesu, Dharma devathai, Pottu vacha neram, Lakshmi vandhachu, Thaye nee thunai and Malare kurinji malare. Almost all major lyricists of his era penned lyrics for his songs, like O. N. V. Kurup, Sreekumaran Thampi, Bichu Thirumala, Poovachal Khader, Chunakkara Ramankutty, Kaithapram Damodaran Namboothiri, Gireesh Puthenchery, Shibu Chakravarthy, etc. Most of his songs were sung by K. J. Yesudas and K. S. Chithra.

== Non-cinematic albums ==
Some of his light music albums and devotional albums, which were most popular in the 1980s and 1990s through All India Radio and audio cassettes were Tharanginiyude Ulsava Gaanangal (festival songs) (1983, 1985), Vasantha Geethangal (1984), Ponnona Tharangini (1992), Amme Saranam Devi Saranam (1994), Sarana Theertham (1997) and Uthradapoonilave (2001). Raveendran did orchestration for Deepam Makaradeepam (1980) composed by BichuThirumala.

== Personal life ==
He was married to Shobha and has three sons. His youngest son, Naveen Madhav, is a playback singer in Tamil, Telugu and Kannada film and twin sons Rajan Madhav, a film director, and Sajan Madhav, a music composer in Telugu, Malayalam and Tamil films. Yakshiyum njanum was the debut movie of Sajan Madhav as composer in Malayalam. Earlier he composed orchestration for the songs of Kalabham and also helped in orchestration of many songs composed by Raveendran.

Raveendran died suddenly at his home in Chennai following a cardiac arrest on 3 March 2005, aged only 61. He was suffering from throat cancer for a long time, and was under treatment when his end occurred. His last works Vadakkumnadhan and Kalabham were released posthumously in 2006.

== As a playback singer ==
He started his career as a playback singer for the 1969 movie Velliyazhcha for which the songs were composed by M. S. Baburaj. His first song was titled "Parvana rajanithan". For a decade, he struggled to get songs and even become a dubbing artist for films. He dubbed for actor Shankar in the movie Aranjaanam directed by P. Venu. As a music director, he sang some of his songs. In 1978 Raveendran sung a song (sandhya vandana geethikaluyarum sanyasikalude asramavadam) with Yesudas in the movie "AVAKASAM" directed by A B Raj.(Then he was called as kulathuppuzha Ravi) Music direction by M K Arjunan and Lyrics by Gopi Kottarappat.

== Major awards ==
National Film Awards:

- 1992 – Special Mention – Bharatham

Kerala State Film Awards:

- 1991 – Best Music Director – Bharatham
- 2002 – Best Music Director – Nandanam

Filmfare Awards South:

- 1990 – Filmfare Award for Best Music Director – Malayalam – His Highness Abdullah
- 1991 – Filmfare Award for Best Music Director – Malayalam – Bharatham
- 1995 – Filmfare Award for Best Music Director – Malayalam – Mazhayethum Munpe
- 2006 – Filmfare Award for Best Music Director – Malayalam – Vadakkumnadhan

Kerala Film Critics Award

- Best Music Director - Bharatham

Asianet Film Awards:

- 2006 – Best Music Director -Vadakkumnadhan

== Notable songs ==
- Tharake Mizhiyithalil ( Choola)
- Chandanamani vathil pathi Chari ( Marikkunnilla Njan)
- Thengum hrudayam... (Aattakkalasham)
- Nirangale... (Aham)
- Harimuraleeravam... (Aaraam Thampuran)
- Pramadhavanam...( His Highness Abdulla)
- Devasabhathalam...( His Highness Abdulla)
- Sree Lathikakal & Sukamo devi...(Sukhamo Devi)
- Gopangane... (Bharatham)
- Ramakadha... (Bharatham)
- Sayanthanam...(Kamaladalam)
- Premodhaaranay...(Kamaladalam)
- Ezhuswarangalum thazhukivarum...(Chirio chiri)
- Pularkala Sundara Swapnathil..........(Oru Maymasa pulariyil)
- Azhake...(Amaram)
- Vikara Naukayumai...(Amaram)
- Kandu njan mizhikalil...(Abhimanyu)
- Vanambaadi etho theerangal...(Desadanakili Karayaarilla)
- Thenum vayambum...(Thenum vayambum)
- Madhumasa Ponnila Choodi...(Kuttettan)
- Innumente Kannuneeril...(Yuvajanotsavam)
- Puzhayorazhakullapennu... (Ente Nadinikkuttikku)
- Hridayam oru veenayai...(Thammil Thammil)
- Aalila Manjalil...(Surya gayathri)
- Kalabham tharaam...(Vadakkumnadhan)
- Enthinu Veroru Sooryodayam...(Mazhayethum munpea)
- Ragangale...(Tharattu)
- Manja Kiliyude...(Kanmadam)
- Manathaaril Ennum...(Kaliyil Alpam Kaaryam)
- Etho Nidrathan...(Ayaal Kathayezhuthukayaanu)
- Moovanthi thazhvarayil...(Kanmadam)
- Vaarmukile vaanil...... (Mazha)
- Kaarmukil varnante.....(Nandanam (film))
- Deenadayalo Raama... (Arayannangalude Veedu)
- Thalam Thettiya... (Thalam Thettiya Tharattu)
- Aalilathaliyumay...(Mizhi Randilum)
- Poovinullil Poo Viriyum (Tharattu)
- Olikkunnuvo Mizhikkumbilil....(Champakulam Thachan)
- Devasandhya Gopurathil.... (Kalabham)
- Deepam Deepam... (Neelakkadambu)
- Kudajaadriyil Kudikollum
- Ganga...... (Vadakkumnathan)
- Sindhura sandhyyakku Mownam (Choola)

== See also ==
- Music of Kerala
- Cinema of Kerala

== Bibliography ==
- M D Manoj Raveendra Sangeetham, Olive Publishers May 2010
- Sobha (Raveend's wife) Raveendra sangeetham Kelkatha ragangal, 2011
