= Bharatham =

1991 Malayalam musical-drama film directed by Sibi Malayil

- DVD cover
- Directed by: Sibi Malayil
- Written by: A. K. Lohithadas
- Produced by: Mohanlal
- Starring: Mohanlal; Urvashi; Nedumudi Venu; Lakshmi; Murali
- Cinematography: Anandakuttan
- Edited by: L. Bhoominathan
- Music by: Raveendran (Songs); Johnson (Score)
- Production company: Pranavam Arts
- Distributed by: Seven Arts Release
- Release date: 29 March 1991
- Running time: 147 minutes
- Country: India
- Language: Malayalam

Bharatham is a 1991 Indian Malayalam-language musical drama film written by A. K. Lohithadas and directed by Sibi Malayil. It stars Mohanlal, Urvashi, Nedumudi Venu, Lakshmi, and Murali. The film was produced by Mohanlal through his production house Pranavam Arts. The film features original songs composed by Raveendran and a background score by Johnson. Bharatham is interpreted as a modern-day adaptation of the Ramayana from Bharatha's perspective. How, in the absence of his elder brother, Gopinathan takes the responsibility of the family and hides his griefs is the core of the story.

The film was a critical and commercial success, running for 125 days in theatres. Bharatham is also noted for its music that is largely Carnatic classical and semi-classical. The film won three National Film Awards—Best Actor for Mohanlal, Best Male Playback Singer for K. J. Yesudas for the song Ramakadha, and Special Mention for Raveendran's music, and five Kerala State Film Awards. On the centenary of Indian cinema in 2013, Forbes India included Mohanlal's performance in the film on its list of "25 Greatest Acting Performances of Indian Cinema". It was remade in Tamil as Seenu by P. Vasu in 2000.

== Plot ==
Kalloor Gopinathan alias Gopi is a member of a happy family with carnatic music heritage and he himself is a good singer. Kalloor Ramanathan who is also an excellent singer, is Gopi's elder brother, guru and role model. Ramanathan is married to Ramani and has a son Appu. Gopi is in love with Devi who is the sister of Ramani. Raman reigns in the family and in the society with his music. But he turns towards alcoholism. Despite several attempts by family members to make him give up the habit and several failed assurances to his family members, he is unable to give up the habit.

Raman reaches for a concert in an inebriated state and Gopi is forced to take over. He is an instant hit with the masses. This has been depicted quite symbolically during the song Sree Vinayagam. Gopi's music, which was hidden behind his brother's charisma now flows out in full strength. Taking this as an insult, Raman starts hating his brother and strives hard to recover from alcoholism. His morale is shattered when organizers of the Tyagaraja Aaradhana select his brother over him to perform. This makes Raman angry. So Gopi decides to stop singing. But on hearing this Raman understands his mistake and asks Gopi to sing at Tyagaraja Aaradhana.

Ramanathan attends his brother's concert in a drunken state but is able to appreciate his brother's talent. In the middle of the concert, he enters the stage, removes his ancestral necklace and puts it on Gopi as a mark of continuation of his legacy. He then walks away into the horizon. With a longing to get rid of the alcoholism and perform a concert with his brother, he sets on a pilgrimage, but was never to return. Gopi, learning that Raman died in an accident, is forced to conceal the truth because of their vocally disabled sister's marriage. Gopi gets lot of moral support with Devi, who also knows the truth. Gopi's trauma reaches penultimate when his family learns of Raman's death and that Gopi was concealing it. Everything ends fine when the family understands his intentions. The movie ends while Gopi begins to train Appu in their musical legacy.

== Cast ==
- Mohanlal as Kalloor "Gopi" Gopinathan
  - Biyon as Young Gopinathan
- Nedumudi Venu as Kalloor "Raman" Ramanathan
- Urvashi as Devi (Voice dubbed by Anandavally)
- Lakshmi as Ramani, wife of Raman and sister of Devi (Voice dubbed by Anandavally)
- Murali as Harikumar
- Vineeth Kumar as Appu
- Suchitra Murali as Radha
- Kaviyoor Ponnamma as Devaki, mother of Raman, Gopi and Radha
- Oduvil Unnikrishnan as Unnimama, maternal uncle of Raman, Gopi and Radha and a Mridangam player
- K. P. A. C. Lalitha as Madhavi Unnimama's wife
- Thikkurissy Sukumaran Nair as Grandfather
- Kunjan as Kuttan
- Bobby Kottarakkara as Kunjunni
- Lalu Alex as Vijayan
- M. S. Thripunithura as Janardhanan Nair
- Subair
- Paravoor Bharathan

== Soundtrack ==
Bharatham

Soundtrack album by Raveendran
- Released: March 29, 1991
- Recorded: February 1991
- Studios: Tharangini, Chennai
- Genre: Film soundtrack
- Label: Tharangini

The film score was composed by Johnson while the acclaimed songs were composed by Raveendran with lyrics were penned by Kaithapram. All the songs of this movie were instant hits.

No.	Title	Singer(s)	Raagam	Notes
1	"Gopangane"	K. J. Yesudas, K. S. Chithra	Naatta (but also has traces of Raag Jog)	Duet song picturised on Mohanlal and Urvashi, Interludes of the song were taken from the Popular Thyagaraja Pancharatna Kriti "Jagadanandakaraka", set in the same raga.
2	"Raajamathangi" ("Dhwani Prasadham")	M. Balamuralikrishna, K. J. Yesudas, K. S. Chithra	Raagamaalika (Mayamalavagowla, Thodi, Arabhi, Kanada)	Title song. Picturised on Nedumudi Venu and Mohanlal.
3	"Raghuvamshapathe"	K. J. Yesudas	Sankarabharanam	Kacheri performance by Mohanlal.
4	"Ramakadha"	K. J. Yesudas	Shubhapantuvarali	Sentimental performance by Mohanlal.
5	"Sree Vinayakam"	K. J. Yesudas, Raveendran	Hamsadhvani	Kacheri performance by Mohanlal and Nedumudi Venu.
6	"Bharatham"	Kallara Gopan, Sangeetha		Not picturised in film.
7	"Vasudevayani"	M. G. Sreekumar		Not picturised in film.
8	"Dhwani Prasadam"	K. J. Yesudas	Mayamalavagowla	End credit song. Picturised on Mohanlal and Vineeth Kumar.

== Release ==
=== Theatrical ===
Bharatham was released on 29 March 1991 considering as a Vishu season release.

=== Home media ===
The VCD and DVD of the film was distributed by Saina Video Vision and Moser Baer. Asianet bagged the television rights and the digital streaming rights were shared by JioHotstar, streaming in their platform, and Millennium Cinemas, streaming on their YouTube channel.

== Awards ==
National Film Awards

- Best Actor - Mohanlal
- Best Male Playback Singer - K. J. Yesudas for Ramakadha Gaanalayam
- Special Mention - Raveendran

Kerala State Film Awards

- Best Actor - Mohanlal
- Second Best Film - Mohanlal (as producer)
- Best Actress - Urvashi
- Best Music Director - Raveendran
- Special Jury Award - Nedumudi Venu

Filmfare Awards South

- Best Director (Malayalam) - Siby Malayil
- Best Music Director (Malayalam) - Raveendran

Kerala Film Critics Association Awards

- Best Film - Sibi Malayil (as director)
- Best Director - Sibi Malayil
- Best Actor - Mohanlal
- Best Screenplay - A. K. Lohithadas
- Best Cinematographer - Anandakuttan
- Best Music Director - Raveendran
- Best Male Playback Singer - K. J. Yesudas
