= Mithunam (1993 film) =

- Promotional poster
- Directed by: Priyadarsan
- Written by: Sreenivasan
- Produced by: Mohanlal
- Starring: Mohanlal; Urvashi
- Cinematography: S. Kumar
- Edited by: N. Gopalakrishnan
- Music by: M. G. Radhakrishnan; S. P. Venkatesh (score)
- Production company: Pranavam Arts
- Distributed by: Pranamam Pictures
- Release date: 25 March 1993
- Running time: 155 minutes
- Country: India
- Language: Malayalam

Mithunam is a 1993 Indian Malayalam-language domestic drama film, directed by Priyadarshan and written by Sreenivasan. The film stars Mohanlal and Urvashi. It was produced by Mohanlal under the banner of Pranavam Arts and was distributed by Pranamam Pictures. The film features songs composed by M. G. Radhakrishnan and background score by S. P. Venkatesh. This movie was remade as Sankalpam in 1995 in Telugu. Though the film was an average at box office it gained cult status over the years.

== Synopsis ==
Sethumadhavan plans to start a biscuit factory, Dakshayani Biscuits, named after his late mother. But the bureaucracy and the corruption of the officials are create hurdles in his way. He also has to solve the problems in his dysfunctional family, including the fights between his brother and brother-in-law, and other family problems.

He marries his long-term fiancée Sulochana, who always cribs that he does not show her the love he had shown before their marriage. After a lot of comical incidents, Sethu establishes his factory and Sulochana realizes her mistakes and patches up with Sethu, and they head to Ooty to resume their honeymoon.

== Cast ==
- Mohanlal as Sethumadhavan aka Sethu
  - Vineeth Kumar as Young Sethu
- Urvashi as Sulochana aka Sulu, Sethu's Lover and Wife (Voice dubbed by Bhagyalakshmi)
  - Baby Ambili as Young Sulochana
- Sreenivasan as Preman, Sethu's Friend and Assistant
- Innocent as Lineman K. T. Kurup, Sethu's Elder Brother
- Jagathy Sreekumar as Head Constable Sugathan, Sethu's Brother-in-Law
- Thikkurissy Sukumaran Nair as Kurup Master, Sethu's Father
- Sankaradi as Sethu's Maternal Uncle
- Janardanan as Sivaraman, Sulochana's Elder Brother
- C. I. Paul as Chief Engineer Karunakaran
- Kuthiravattam Pappu as 'Palisha' Peethambaran / Peethambara Kurup
- Nedumudi Venu as Cherkkonam Swamy
- Sukumari as Swamini Amma
- Meena as House Maid
- Zeenath as Subhadra, K. T. Kurup's Wife
- K. R. Vatsala as Renuka, Sethu's Elder Sister and Sugathan's Wife
- Soumya(Gayathri Chavli) as Asha, Sethu's Younger Sister and Preman's Love Interest
- Usha as Shyama, Sulochana's Friend
- Kuttyedathi Vilasini as Shyama's Kunjamma
- Kozhikode Narayanan Nair as Village Officer
- Kanakalatha as Sivaraman's Wife
- Kaveri as Sulochana's Younger Sister
- Nandu as Auto Rickshaw Driver
- James as Pappi, Peethambaran's Henchman
- Vishal Menon as Rajesh, Sugathan's Son

== Production ==
Major plot point in the film is when Sethumadhavan and Sulochana leaves for honeymoon with their entire family members. This incident was based on the honeymoon trip of actress Menaka and film producer G. Suresh Kumar. They went to Ooty for honeymoon, Suresh Kumar's brother and his wife and son were also in the car with them, director Vijayan, producer Sanal Kumar and P. Radhakrishnan joined them along the way. They reached the destination after midnight and slept together at servants' dormitory of a hotel as rooms were unavailable. Menaka and Suresh Kumar told this incident to Priyadarshan, who decided to include this in the film. Sabu Cyril served as the art director, while Kumar was the choreographer and Thyagarajan was the action director.

== Soundtrack ==
The songs in the movie was composed by M. G. Radhakrishnan and written by O. N. V. Kurup. The songs were distributed by Magna Sound. The background score for the movie was composed by S. P. Venkatesh.

All music is composed by M. G. Radhakrishnan.

No.	Title	Artist(s)	Length
1.	"Njattu Velakkiliye" (Female version)	K. S. Chitra	3:52
2.	"Allimalar Kavil"	M. G. Sreekumar	4:20
3.	"Poomanjin Koodarathil"	M. G. Sreekumar, Sujatha Mohan	4:17
4.	"Njattu Velakkiliye" (Male version)	M. G. Sreekumar	3:48
Total length:			15:37

== Legacy ==
In the 2014 film, Polytechnic, the name of the biscuit factory in Mithunam, Dakshayani Biscuits, was adapted for a defunct biscuit factory in the film, which the protagonist played by Kunchacko Boban buys. In the 2021 film Minnal Murali, a biscuit packet named as Dakshayani Biscuits is shown in a shot.
