= Olympian Anthony Adam =

- Poster
- Directed by: Bhadran
- Written by: Story: Babu G. Nair; Bhadran; Screenplay: Bhadran; Dialogues: Babu G. Nair
- Produced by: Mohanlal
- Starring: Mohanlal; Meena; Nassar
- Cinematography: Sanjeev Shankar
- Edited by: Sateesh
- Music by: Ouseppachan
- Production company: Pranavam Arts
- Distributed by: Pranavam Arts
- Release date: 15 October 1999
- Running time: 153 minutes
- Country: India
- Language: Malayalam

Olympian Anthony Adam is a 1999 Indian Malayalam-language action thriller film written and directed by Bhadran. It stars Mohanlal, Meena and Nassar with Jagathy Sreekumar and Seema in supporting roles. The film was produced by Mohanlal through his company Pranavam Arts. The music was composed by Ouseppachan. The plot follows an investigation by Chakkummoottil Varghese Antony IPS (Mohanlal) of a planned terrorist attack in India.

Olympian Anthony Adam was released on 15 October 1999.

== Plot ==
Antony Varghese Chakkummoottil is a police officer and a former Olympian who has participated in the discus throw competition. He is sent to a school as a physical director for undercover operation on government's recommendation. His task is to get details about an international criminal Roy Mamman alias Lawrence Luther who is behind the terrorist attacks in the city by identifying the criminal's child who is studying in that school.

During his investigation he meets Angel Mary, a teacher with temper issues, and attracts her animosity. Antony discovers that Angel is estranged from her husband, who turned out to be a drug addict, since the day after their wedding. Later Antony and Angel Mary fall in love with each other.

He finds out Luther's daughter Rose by accident. He makes the school principal Susan call Luther saying that Rose is afflicted with rabies after a dog bite. Luther rushes to see Rose, falling for the trap that Antony has set for him.

== Cast ==
- Mohanlal as SP Chakkamoottil Antony Varghese IPS / "Olympian" Anthony Adam
- Meena as Angel Mary
- Nassar as Roy Mamman / Lawrence Luther
- Jagathy Sreekumar as Vattoli Porinchu
- Seema as Susan Roy
- K. B. Ganesh Kumar as ASP Nasser IPS
- Kitty as DGP Krishnan Nair IPS
- Major Ravi as ASP Nandakumar IPS
- Spadikam George as IG George Korah IPS
- Chali Pala as Circle Inspector Ummerkutty
- Arun Kumar as Tony Issac
- Sanika Nambiar as Rose Mamman
- Valsala Menon as Chakkummoottil Therutha
- Poornima Anand as Lilly
- Sukumari as Bella Mam
- Mukesh Rishi as Alvin
- Rani as Ammu Issac
- Ajith Kollam as Sub Inspector Vivek
- Tom Mattel as Chakka Thomman

== Soundtrack ==
The music was by Ouseppachan, and the lyrics were by Gireesh Puthenchery. The lyrics for the song "Peppara Perapera" are taken from Arundhati Roy's novel The God of Small Things.

Song	Singers	Notes
"Hey Chumma Chumma"	K. J. Yesudas, Sujatha Mohan	
"Kadambanaattu Kaalavela"	M. G. Sreekumar	
"Kokki Kurukiyum"	M. G. Sreekumar, Chorus	Raga: Gourimanohari
"Kunnela" [Bit]	M. G. Sreekumar, Sujatha Mohan	
"Nilaapaithale"	K. J. Yesudas	
"Nilaapaithale"	K. S. Chithra	
"One Little"	Ouseppachan	
"Peppara Perapera"	Mohanlal	

== Release ==
The film had an average box office run.
