= Harimuraleeravam =

Song by K. J. Yesudas

from the album Aaraam Thampuran
- Language: Malayalam
- English title: Sound from the Hari's flute
- Released: 1997
- Recorded: 1997
- Genre: Semi-classical music
- Length: 11:51
- Label: Sargam Speed Audios; Satyam Audios
- Composer: Raveendran
- Lyricist: Gireesh Puthenchery
- Producer: Revathy Kalamandhir

Music video
- "Harimuraleeravam" on YouTube

"Harimuraleeravam" (transl. Sound from Hari's flute) is a song composed by Raveendran included in the soundtrack for the 1997 Malayalam-language film Aaraam Thampuran. The song was majorly composed in Sindhu Bhairavi raga yet deviates and travels to other ragas including Saramati halfway. The song was penned by Gireesh Puthenchery and sung by K. J. Yesudas with a narration by Mohanlal and composer Reghu Kumar on Jathi portion.

This song was picturised on Mohanlal in the film. Yesudas won his 21st Kerala State Film Award for Best Male Playback Singer for this song. The "Harimuraleeravam" sequence has been an inspiration for similar song sequence in Apthamitra ("Kana Kanade Shaarade") and its remake Chandramukhi ("Athinthom"). The Times of India selected Harimuraleeravam as one among the five iconic Malayalam songs sung by Yesudas.

== Style ==
Harimuraleeravam is composed using the Sindhu Bhairavi raga. Raveendran has given the song a South Indian touch by using mridangam, tabla, veena and violin.

== Filming ==
The song was picturized in the film as the rough character Jagannathan, played by Mohanlal, reveals his music knowledge to Unnimaya, portrayed by Manju Warrier. The locations were Varikkasseri Mana, shot the present-day and Mahabalipuram, where a set was made to film Jagannadhan's flashback and dance sequences. The Mahabalipuram sequence was directed by Priyadarshan.Urvashi made a cameo appearance in the song
