= Pranavam Arts International =

Indian film production company

- Type: Private
- Industry: Entertainment
- Founded: 1990
- Founder: Mohanlal
- Defunct: 2010
- Successor: Aashirvad Cinemas
- Headquarters: Thiruvananthapuram, Kerala, India
- Area served: India
- Key people: Mohanlal; Suchitra Mohanlal
- Products: Films

Pranavam Arts International (formerly Pranavam Arts or Pranavams International) was an Indian film production and distribution company based in Thiruvananthapuram, Kerala, founded in 1990 by Indian actor Mohanlal. Since then the company has produced a total of 11 films, including two of the most-expensive Malayalam films of its time—Kaalapani (1996) and Vanaprastham (1999). Vanaprastham was selected at the Un Certain Regard section at the 1999 Cannes Film Festival. The company has won a National Film Award for Best Feature Film (Vanaprastham) and two Kerala State Film Award for Second Best Film (Bharatham and Kaalapani). The company's distribution division was called Pranamam Pictures.

== History ==
The company was named after the word Praṇavaṁ and its logo contains a figure of Nataraja. Pranavam Art's first production was the 1990 musical-drama film His Highness Abdullah directed by Sibi Malayil and written by A. K. Lohithadas, in which Mohanlal portrayed a contract killer who disguise as a singer to infiltrate a palace for killing the head of the family. His Highness Abdullah became the highest-grossing Malayalam film of the year and was one of the biggest hits in Malayalam cinema. The film won two National Film Awards. It was followed by another musical drama, Bharatham (1991), again from Malayil-Lohithadas team. The film was a critical and commercial success and won four Kerala State Film Awards and three National Film Awards, including the Kerala State Film Award for Second Best Film and Mohanlal won the National Film Award for Best Actor. The team collaborated once again for a musical drama, Kamaladalam (1992), which was also a critical and commercial success.

In 1993, Pranavam produced the Priyadarshan-directed comical family drama Mithunam starring Mohanlal and Urvashi as a newly married couple struggling to find time for each other amidst continued issues in their disorganised joint family. The film was written by Sreenivasan. In the following year, Mohanlal produced and starred in Pingami, a drama thriller directed by Sathyan Anthikkad, in which he played Captain Vijay Menon who investigates the trail of a murder. Pingami was not a success in the theatres, but over the years, the film has achieved a cult following. The period drama Kaalapani was released in 1996, directed by Priyadarshan. It was based on the life of Indian freedom fighters incarcerated in the Cellular Jail in the Andaman and Nicobar Islands during British Raj. With a budget of ₹2.5 crore, it was then the most-expensive Malayalam film. The film won seven Kerala State Film Awards (including Second Best Film and Best Actor for Mohanlal) and four National Film Awards.

Lohithadas wrote and directed Pranavam's seventh production, Kanmadam (1998), a drama set in a remote village in Palakkad, where a stranger (portrayed by Mohanlal) reaches to hand over the belongings of a man he accidentally killed. The film was a critical and commercial success. In the same year, the company produced a detective comedy, Harikrishnans, starring Mammootty and Mohanlal as two attorneys investigating a murder. The film was made on a budget of ₹2.5 crore, making it one of the most-expensive Malayalam films at the time. It was also a commercial success, becoming the highest-grossing film of the year. However, the film fell into controversy and company faced legal trouble for releasing two different endings of the film, one of them not certified by the Central Board of Film Certification, the board sent notice for violating The Cinematograph Act. Eventually, the unapproved alternate ending (in which Meera gets to marry Krishnan) was to be pulled off from theatres to settle the issue.

In 1999, the company produced the action thriller Olympiyan Anthony Adam directed by Bhadran. Mohanlal played Varghese Antony IPS, a cop who is tasked with investigating a terrorist attack that require him to go undercover as a physical trainer in a boarding school. The film was a moderate success at the box office. In the same year, the company co-produced the Indo-French period drama Vanaprastham directed by Shaji N. Karun and produced by Pierre Assouline. It was the second international co-production in Malayalam. The film depicted the mental agony of a Kathakali dancer, Kunjikuttan, played by Mohanlal. With a budget of ₹3.8 crore, Vanaprastham was then the most-expensive Malayalam film. It was the first Indian film made in Panavision format. Vanaprastham was selected at the Un Certain Regard section of the 1999 Cannes Film Festival. The film won three National Film Awards, including Best Feature Film and Best Actor for Mohanlal, and six Kerala State Film Awards (including Best Director and Best Actor for Mohanlal).

After an 11-year hiatus, the company returned to production in 2010. The company's name was updated to Pranavam Arts International and co-produced the Major Ravi-directed military film Kandahar. It was based on the hijacking of the Indian Airlines Flight 814 while en route from Kathmandu to Delhi in 1999. Amitabh Bachchan appeared in the film alongside Mohanlal, and it was his maiden Malayalam film. Kandahar was the third installment in the Major Mahadevan film series. However, unlike its predecessors, the film received negative critical response and under-performed at the box office.

== Filmography ==
=== Produced ===
Year	Title	Director	Notes
1990	His Highness Abdullah	Sibi Malayil	
1991	Bharatham	Sibi Malayil	Won: Kerala State Film Award for Second Best Film and Kerala Film Critics Association Award for Best Film
1992	Kamaladalam	Sibi Malayil	
1993	Mithunam	Priyadarshan	
1994	Pingami	Sathyan Anthikkad	
1996	Kaalapani	Priyadarshan	Won: Kerala State Film Award for Second Best Film
1998	Kanmadam	A. K. Lohithadas	
1998	Harikrishnans	Fazil	
1999	Olympiyan Anthony Adam	Bhadran	
1999	Vanaprastham	Shaji N. Karun	Indo-French co-production Won: National Film Award for Best Feature Film and Kerala Film Critics Association Award for Best Film; Selected: Un Certain Regard section at the 1999 Cannes Film Festival
2010	Kandahar	Major Ravi	Co-produced

=== Distributed ===
Mohanlal distributed films in Kerala under the company Pranamam Pictures (or Pranamam Movies). The following is an incomplete partial list of films:

Year	Title	Language	Notes
1993	Mithunam	Malayalam	Also producer
1993	Pudhiya Mugam	Tamil	
1993	Gandharvam	Malayalam	
1994	Pingami	Malayalam	Also producer
1995	Nirnayam	Malayalam	
1996	Kaalapani	Malayalam	Co-distributor
1997	Iruvar	Tamil	
1997	Varnapakittu	Malayalam	
1997	Virasat	Hindi	
1998	Kanmadam	Malayalam	Also producer
1998	Harikrishnans	Malayalam	Also producer
1999	Megham	Malayalam	
1999	Hum Dil De Chuke Sanam	Hindi	
1999	Olympiyan Anthony Adam	Malayalam	Also producer
1999	Vanaprastham	Malayalam	Also co-producer
2000	Kandukondain Kandukondain	Tamil	

== See also ==
- Maxlab Cinemas and Entertainments
- Aashirvad Cinemas
