= Aaraam Thampuran =

1997 film by Shaji Kailas

- Movie Poster
- Directed by: Shaji Kailas
- Written by: Ranjith
- Produced by: G. Suresh Kumar; Sanal Kumar
- Starring: Mohanlal; Manju Warrier
- Cinematography: P. Sukumar
- Edited by: L. Bhoominathan
- Music by: Raveendran (Songs); C.Rajamani (score)
- Production company: Revathy Kalamandhir
- Distributed by: Swargachitra Release
- Release date: 25 December 1997
- Running time: 174 minutes
- Country: India
- Language: Malayalam
- Budget: ₹2.5 crore (US$270,000)
- Box office: ₹14.5 crore (US$1.5 million)

Aaraam Thampuran (transl. The Sixth Lord) is a 1997 Indian Malayalam-language action drama film directed by Shaji Kailas, written by Ranjith and produced by Revathy Kalamandhir. It stars Mohanlal in the title role with Narendra Prasad, Manju Warrier, Sai Kumar, Oduvil Unnikrishnan, Cochin Haneefa and Srividya in supporting roles. The story follows Jagannadhan (Mohanlal), a former Mumbai-based enforcer who buys an old kovilakam (royal manor) named Kanimangalam and shifts the balance of power in that village, and he comes to be known as Aaram Thampuran (sixth lord). The film features original songs composed by Raveendran.

== Plot ==
Nandakumar is a business tycoon in Mumbai, who faces huge financial loss when his manager Aby Mathew decides to broker a deal with an Australian group and another rival Indian firm. Nandakumar calls up his friend and enforcer Jagannadhan, to intervene. Jagan lands up at Aby's office and forces him to withdraw from brokering the deal with the Australian company, thereby bringing massive profit to Nandan. In return, Nandan is profuse in his offers to Jagan, all of which he humbly disavows. Jagan finally demands from Nandan a small favor. He wants Nandan to purchase a kovilakam (manor or estate) at Kanimangalam, a village in Kerala, to which Nandan agrees.

Jagan also expresses his desire that the palace should be bought in the name of Nandan, and Jagan should be there as a benami of him. Jagannadhan reaches Kanimangalam for the registration of the palace and the property surrounding it. Meanwhile, Kulappully Appan Thamburan, a feudal landlord with vested interests, opposes the purchase of the property. Appan lost one of his eyes after he got a slash with a sword in a fight at a young age. Appan's sister was married to Dathan Thampuran of Kanimangalam palace, who deserted her one day. The extreme hatred towards Kanimangalam had made Appan to even stop the annual temple festival, which according to the villagers, has resulted in the anger of the local deity.

With the arrival of Jagannathan, Appan is back again to create troubles, but Jagannathan tactfully overcomes it and gets the palace registered. Presently the palace is occupied by an old musician Krishna Varma and his foster daughter Unnimaya, but is disowned by the rest of his family members. Though, now in the hands of Jagan, he allows Varma and Unnimaya to stay in the palace. Though, initially, both Varma and Unnimaya felt uncomfortable in staying with Jagan, slowly, they develop an affection towards him. Within a short time, Jagan gets involved in the problems of the villagers, and they started considering him to the heir of the palace and their leader.

Jagannathan invites the ire of Appan Thamburan, with whom he clashes over the demolition of the palace, which he had earlier promised during the registration. Jagan, when he expresses his desire to stay at Kanimangalam, Appan sends his henchmen, who had to humiliatingly return from Jagan. Now, the villagers decide to hold up the annual festival at the temple, after a long gap of 16 years. Jagannathan takes up the leadership, and with the support of villagers, he starts the preparations. Within mean time, Unnimaya develops a closeness towards him. In the midst of this, Nayanthara, Jagan's close friend reaches Kanimangalam from Bangalore who expresses her desire to marry Jagan, which he declines, saying that he is now in love with Unnimaya.

Nayanthara accepts his decision and goes back, wishing him all the best for the future. According to the customs of the village, the festival puja should be done under a head priest from Keezhpayoor Mana. Still, when Appan Thamburan interferes, the members from Keezhpayoor refuses to conduct the puja, which makes Jagan to forcefully take the younger Namboothiri away from home on the way back. Suddenly Nandakumar lands down at Kanimangalam with his friends, who harass Unnimaya, and attempt to force Krishna Varma to drink alcohol against his will. This upsets Jagan, and, without Nandan's knowledge, he forcefully sends them back from Kanimangalam.

In the midst of this, the younger priest is taken away by Appan Thamburan's men. It is then revealed by Jagan that he is the son of the Kaloor Brahmadathan Namboothiripadu, the head priest of the temple, who died after being wrongly accused of stealing the divine ornaments of the Goddess. Jagan follows Ayinikad Namboothiri, the astrologer's instructions, and wears his Yagyopaveetham, the holy thread, and adopts back Brahmanyam. The day of the festival arrives. Nandan, who had gone in search of his friends, is now back in an inebriated condition and furiously demands Jagan to leave the palace.

Jagan pleads with him one day's time, but Nandan is not ready to listen. Finding no other option, Jagan locks up Nandan in a room and reaches the temple to perform the rituals. Kulappully Appan's henchmen attacks villagers. Jagan is helpless as he is supposed to control his emotions while performing the puja and holding the divine ornaments of the Goddess. The younger priest suddenly reappears and replaces Jagan in the puja so that Jagan can save the villagers. Jagan fights and saves the villagers, emerging as their leader. He then points his sword at Appan's neck and threatens to kill him if he ever comes back.

The festival concludes successfully, and the village is cheerful. Nandan is released, and Jagan announces to the cheering crowd that it is not him, but Nandakumar, the original owner of the Kanimangalam palace, and he is leaving the village with both Unnimaya and Krishna Varma, but Nanda Kumar, who is overwhelmed by seeing the affection of the people for Jagan, calls him back and hands over the ownership to him.

== Cast ==
- Mohanlal as Jagannathan / Kanimangalam Jagannathan Thampuran / Aaraam Thampuran
- Manju Warrier as Unnimaya
- Narendra Prasad as Kulappully Appan Thampuran
- Sai Kumar as Nandakumar (Jaganathan's friend)
- Oduvil Unnikrishnan as Krishna Varma Thampuran (Unnimaya's foster father)
- Priya Raman as Nayanthara
- Srividya as Subhadra Thamburatti
- Cochin Haneefa as Govindan Kutty
- Augustine as Thangalangadi Bappu
- Maniyanpilla Raju as Soman Pillai
- Kunchan as Nambeesan
- Sankaradi as Ezhuthachan
- Kuthiravattam Pappu as Mangalam
- T. P. Madhavan as Pisharody
- Mohan Raj as Chenkalam Madhavan
- Innocent as S.I. Bharathan
- Chithra as Thottathil Meenakshi
- Amitha sebastian as Thottathil Meenakshi's maid
- Honey as Adichuthalikkari
- Kalabhavan Mani as the younger Namboothiri of Keezhpayoor Mana
- K. B. Ganesh Kumar as Rural S.P. Ashok Kumar
- Madampu Kunjukuttan as Aynikkadu Thirumeni
- Bobby Kottarakkara as the guest-house assistant
- Sadiq as Balarama Varma
- Jagannatha Varma as Kulappully Mahadevan Thampuran aka Cheriyachhan
- Bheeman Raghu as Appu Kutty Nambiar
- Ajith Kollam as Prabhu, Appan's henchmen
- Kundara Johnny as Arjunan, Appan's henchmen
- V. K. Sreeraman as District Collector Eeshwaranunni
- Ramu as Salim Ahmed, Nandakumar's friend
- Subair as Abey Mathew
- Nizzar as James
- Manjith as kuttan
- Alleppey Ashraf as Jayaraman (Nandakumar's friend)
- Urvashi as a dancer (uncredited)

=== Family tree ===
Kaloormadam Family
Kulappully Family

Kulappully Veeravarma Thampuran (ancestor)
Kulappully Sankaran Thampuran	Hemavathi	Kulappully Mahadevan Thampuran
Kaloormadam Bhramadathan Namboothiri	Kunjilekshmiyammal	Kulappully Appan Thampuran	Kulappully Subhadra	Kanimangalam Dathan Thampuran
Kanimangalam Jagannathan Thampuran	Unnimaya

== Soundtrack ==
Aaraam Thampuran

Soundtrack album by Raveendran
- Released: 1997
- Genre: Soundtrack
- Labels: Sargam Speed Audios; Satyam Audios

Raveendran chronology
Malayaalamaasam Chingam Onninu (1996)	Aaraam Thampuran (1997)	Aattuvela (1997)

This film includes five songs written by Gireesh Puthenchery and one traditional song by Muthuswami Dikshitar. The songs are composed by Raveendran. The song were widely popular and topped the charts for months. The song Harimuraliravam was picturized by director Priyadarshan as Shaji Kailas was on paternity break.

Track	Song	Singer(s)	Lyricist	Raga
1	"Harimuraleeravam"	K. J. Yesudas, Reghu Kumar (Jathi), Mohanlal (narration)	Gireesh Puthenchery	Sindhu Bhairavi
2	"Paadi"	K. S. Chithra	Gireesh Puthenchery	Darbar
3	"Santhatham"	Manju Menon, Chorus	Gireesh Puthenchery	Raagamaalika (Mohanam, Gowlipantu, Begada)
4	"Kadalaadum"	M. G. Sreekumar, K. S. Chithra, Chorus	Gireesh Puthenchery	Mohanam
5	"Kuyilpaadum"	M. G. Sreekumar, Sujatha Mohan	Gireesh Puthenchery	Madhyamavati
6	"Paadi"	K. J. Yesudas	Gireesh Puthenchery	Darbar
7	"Santhatham"	K. J. Yesudas, Sharreth	Gireesh Puthenchery	Raagamaalika (Reetigowla, Vasantha, Shree)
8	"Govardhana Gireesham"	K. P. Beena Rajan, Chorus	Traditional (Muthuswami Dikshitar)	Hindolam

== Reception ==
=== Box office ===
The film was released in December 1997, which was subjected to high expectations, as it was the first collaboration between Mohanlal and Shaji Kailas. Upon its release, The film redefined the career of Shaji Kailas as a successful director. The film was made on a budget of ₹2.5 crore (US$270,000), which was a high-budget film at the time. The film collected ₹4 lakhs (US$5,000) from first week, which was a record. Grossing over ₹7.5 crore (US$800,000), Aaraam Thampuran became the highest grossing Malayalam film ever surpassing Chandralekha.

=== Critical response ===
Padmanabha Venugopal of The Indian Express wrote, "The songs are ordinary, and the dialogue reminds us again of Devasuram as both scripts were authored by Ranjith. But it is an entertaining movie with brilliant acting from Lal, Manju and Narendra Prasad".

== Awards ==
Kerala State Film Awards

- Best Singer – K. J. Yesudas
- Best Background Music – C. Rajamani

Kerala Film Critics Association Awards

- Best Male Playback Singer – K. J. Yesudas

Filmfare Awards South

- Best Actress in Malayalam – Manju Warrier
