= K. J. Yesudas =

Indian singer (born 1940)

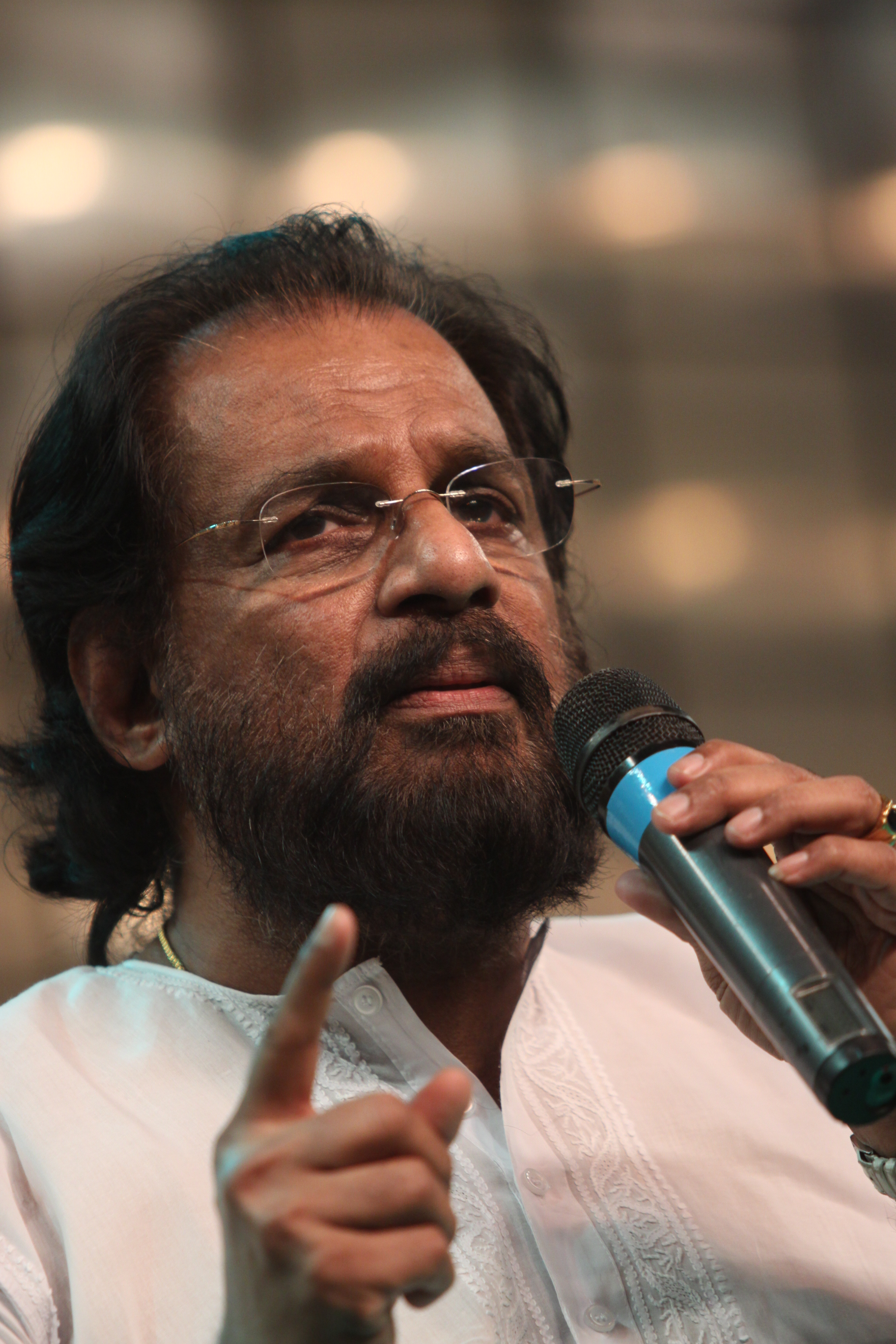
- Yesudas in June 2011
- Born: Kattassery Joseph Yesudas; 10 January 1940 (age 86); Fort Kochi, Kingdom of Cochin, British India (present-day Kerala, India)
- Other name: Ganagandharvan
- Education: Swathi Thirunal College of Music, Thiruvananthapuram
- Occupations: Singer; composer; music producer
- Years active: 1961–present
- Spouse: Prabha (m. 1970)
- Children: 3, including Vijay Yesudas
- Awards: Full list
- Honours: Padma Shri (1975); Padma Bhushan (2002); Padma Vibhushan (2017)
- Musical career
- Genres: Indian classical music; Playback singing; Filmi
- Instrument: Vocals
- Labels: Tharangni; His Master's Voice

Kattassery Joseph Yesudas (/jeːʃud̪aːs/; born 10 January 1940) is an Indian playback singer and musician who sings Indian classical, devotional and film songs. He is widely considered one of the greatest singers in the history of Indian music and is the most famous cultural and entertainment industry icon of Kerala from the modern era. In a career spanning six decades, Yesudas is estimated to have recorded more than 50,000 songs in various Indian languages, including Malayalam, Tamil, Kannada, Telugu, Tulu, Hindi, Odia, Bengali, Marathi as well as Arabic, English, Latin, and Russian. He is referred to by the epithet Gaanagandharvan (transl. The Celestial Singer) in reverence for his sweet, ethereal voice. Yesudas holds the world record for singing and recording 16 new songs in different languages in a single day. He also composed a number of Malayalam film songs during the 1970s and 1980s.

Yesudas has won the National Award for Best Male Playback Singer a record eight times, the Filmfare Awards South five times, and the State Award for the Best Playback Singer 36 times, including awards given by the state governments of Kerala, Tamil Nadu, Andhra Pradesh, Karnataka and West Bengal. He was awarded the Padma Shri in 1975, the Padma Bhushan in 2002, and the Padma Vibhushan (second-highest civilian award) in 2017 by the Government of India for his contributions towards the arts. In 2002, he was honoured with the J. C. Daniel Award, the Kerala government's highest honour for contributions to Malayalam cinema, making him the youngest recipient of that award. In 2011, Yesudas received with the CNN-IBN outstanding achievement award for his contributions in the music field. In 2006, he recorded 16 film songs in four South Indian languages in a single day at AVM Studio, Chennai.

== Early life ==
K. J. Yesudas was born in Kochi, in Kerala, to Augustine Joseph and Elizabeth Joseph. His father was a well-known Malayalam classical musician and stage actor. Yesudas was the second of seven children, preceded by an elder sister named Pushpa, and followed by four younger brothers – Antony (Antappan), Babu, Mani, Justin and a younger sister, Jayamma. Among these siblings, Pushpa and Babu died of fever at a young age, and Justin, the youngest brother, died under mysterious circumstances in February 2020, aged 62.

Augustine Joseph's dearest friend, Musician Kunjan Velu Bhagavatharm was Yesudas's first guru. Kunjan Velu was the disciple of Nadaswara Chakravarthi T. N. Rajarathnam Pillai. Yesudas started his academic music training at R. L. V. Music Academy, Thrippunithura and completed the Ganabooshanam course. Later he studied at Swathi Thirunal College of Music, Thiruvananthapuram under the tutelage of the carnatic music maestro K. R. Kumaraswamy Iyer and Semmangudi Srinivasa Iyer but could not complete his studies due to financial constraints. For a brief period, he also studied music under Vechoor Harihara Subramania Iyer, after which he took advanced training from Chembai Vaidyanatha Bhagavatar.

K. J. Yesudas married Prabha Yesudas on 1 February 1970 in Mallapally.

In 2021, Yesudas completed 60 years as a playback singer.

== Career ==
=== Debut and early career: 1960s ===
Yesudas with poet and lyricist O. N. V. Kurup

Yesudas recorded his first popular song Jaathi Bhedam Matha Dwesham (music: M. B. Sreenivasan) on 14 November 1961. The singer considers those four lines he got to sing to start his career in films as a huge blessing as it was written by none other than Sree Narayana Guru, the most respected saint-poet-social reformer of Kerala. The film was Kalpadukal (1962), based on social reform during the life and times of Sree Narayana Guru. He associated with popular singers of those times like P. Leela, Santha P. Nair, K. P. Udayabhanu, S. Janaki etc. and lyricists like P. Bhaskaran and Nambiyath. He sang the lines of poet Kumaran Asan for this film. After the initial years he became the most sought after by established music directors of that time, M. B. Sreenivasan, G. Devarajan, V. Dakshinamoorthy, Br Lakshmanan, M. S. Baburaj and many others. Thus began his career in playback singing which included the Malayalam, Tamil, Telugu and Kannada movies thereafter.

He got the first major break with the hit Malayalam film named Bharya ( music by G. Devarajan and lyrics by Vayalar Ramavarma). In 1967, he sang hit songs in the composition of M.S.Baburaj for the film Udhyogastha directed by P.Venu. He also sang in Tamil for Bommai first (music: S. Balachander), but the first released movie was Konjum Kumari (music: Veda). In 1965, he was invited by the Soviet Union government to perform at music concerts in various cities in the USSR and also sang a Russian song over Radio Kazakhstan. The trio of Salil, Yesudas and Prem Nazir entered the Malayalam Cinema Industry of the 1970s.

Yesudas has reportedly undergone Ayurvedic treatment under the Pulamanthole Mooss tradition in Kerala.

In 1970 he was nominated to head the Kerala Sangeetha Nataka Academy and was the youngest person ever to occupy the post.

=== Bollywood: 1970s ===
After a decade of singing in South Indian movies, Yesudas got a break in Bollywood in the early 1970s. The first Hindi song he sang was for the movie Jai Jawan Jai Kissan (1971), but the first released movie was Chhoti Si Baat, which resulted in his becoming popular for singings songs like "Jaaneman Jaaneman". He has sung Hindi songs for many leading actors in Hindi cinema including Amitabh Bachchan, Amol Palekar and Jeetendra. He has sung many evergreen Hindi film songs for music directors including Ravindra Jain, Bappi Lahiri, Khayyam, Raj Kamal and Salil Chowdhury.

Yesudas' most popular Hindi songs are in the 1976 movie Chitchor, with music given by Ravindra Jain.

On 14 November 1999, Yesudas was presented with an honorary award by UNESCO for "Outstanding Achievements in Music and Peace" at the "Music for Peace" event in Paris, a concert held to mark the dawn of the new millennium and whose attendees included artistes such as Lionel Richie, Ray Charles, Montserrat Caballé, and Zubin Mehta.

In 2001 he sang for album Ahimsa in Sanskrit, Latin and English and in a mix of styles including new-age and Carnatic. In his music concerts in the Middle East he sings Arabic songs in the Carnatic style. He frequently serves as a cultural ambassador for India through his performances abroad, promoting Indian music.

In 2009 Yesudas began a cross-country musical campaign against terrorism in Thiruvananthapuram, with the motto 'Music For Peace'. Kavita Karkare, wife of Hemant Karkare, handed over the torch to Yesudas to mark the launch of the 'Shanthi Sangeetha Yatra'. Yesudas has performed for 36 times in the 36-year-old Soorya Music festival organised by Soorya Krishnamoorthy.

== Personal life and influences ==
Yesudas is married to Prabha since 1 February 1970. They have three sons, Vinod (b. 1977), Vijay (b. 1979) and Vishal (b. 1981). Their second son, Vijay, is a musician who won the Kerala State Film Award for Best Male Playback Singer in 2007, 2012 and 2018. They've been living in Dallas since 2020.

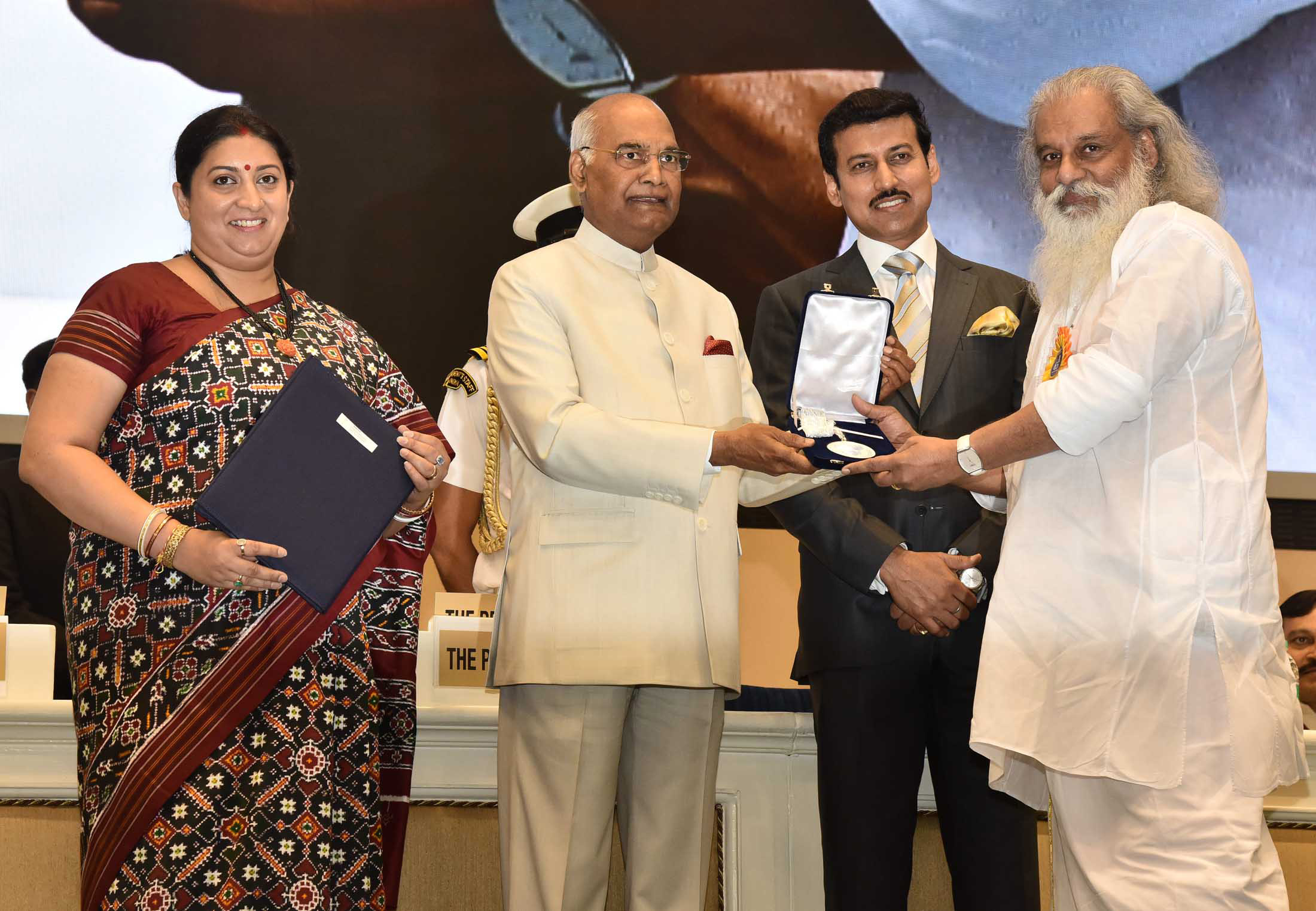
Ram Nath Kovind, the President of India presenting the Rajat Kamal Award to Yesudas

Sree Narayana Guru's message, "One religion and One God for all humanity", influenced young Yesudas in his dealings with his fellow men. He had his own heroes among the musicians too. Mohammed Rafi, Chembai Vaidyanatha Bhagavatar and Balamurali Krishna are the ones he admires the most. Yesudas has been visiting Kollur Mookambika temple, Kollur, Karnataka on his birthday to sing keerthans of Saraswati devi, the Goddess of knowledge, music and the arts. The music festival started on his 60th birthday in 2000. The nine-day music festival begins every January at Kollur Mookambika Temple.

On Sunday, 10 January 2010, he celebrated his 70th birthday (Sapthathi) at Kollur Sri Mookambika Temple with 'Sangeetharchana' (classical devotional songs), along with 70 singers before goddess Mookambika. The Sangeetharchana included "Pancharatna Gayana" of Thyagaraja's poems. He also took part in the Vidyarambha function. All India Radio broadcast the special Sangeetharchana all over Kerala. Yesudas also has many songs devoted to Lord Ayyappa including the hit song "Harivarasanam". In 2002, during Marad massacre, he visited the place along with the veteran poet Sugathakumari, and conducted classes against violence. Harivarasanam, a devotional song musical version composed by G. Devarajan, recited before closing the temple at Sabarimala was sung by Yesudas. Though there have been many different renditions of this song by many different renowned singers, Sabarimala officially uses Yesudas' voice for Harivarasanam every day.

== Music company and school ==
In 1980 Yesudas established the Tharangini Studio at Thiruvananthapuram. In 1992 the office and studio were moved to Chennai and the company was incorporated in the US in 1998. Tharangni Studio and Tharangni Records became a recording center in Kerala which, for the first time, brought out audio cassettes of Malayalam film songs in stereo. The record company also had a voice mixing studio in Studio27, Chennai. The studio continues to produce and present events of Yesudas, both for film and Indian classical music concerts throughout the world.

Yesudas founded Tharanganisari School of Music in 1975 to train students in various branches of music. The school is recognized by Government of Kerala. It is managed by a society which is registered under the Travancore-Cochin Literary, Scientific and Charitable Societies Act 12 of 1955. It is situated at Edappazhanji, Thiruvananthapuram. A music appreciation class is held on the second Saturday of every month at the school. The class is free for all and is open to public of all ages. Composer Perumbavoor G. Raveendranath worked as a music teacher in 1976. Some of the notable alumni of the school are composers Mohan Sithara, Murali Sithara and guitarist John Antony.

== Awards and honours ==
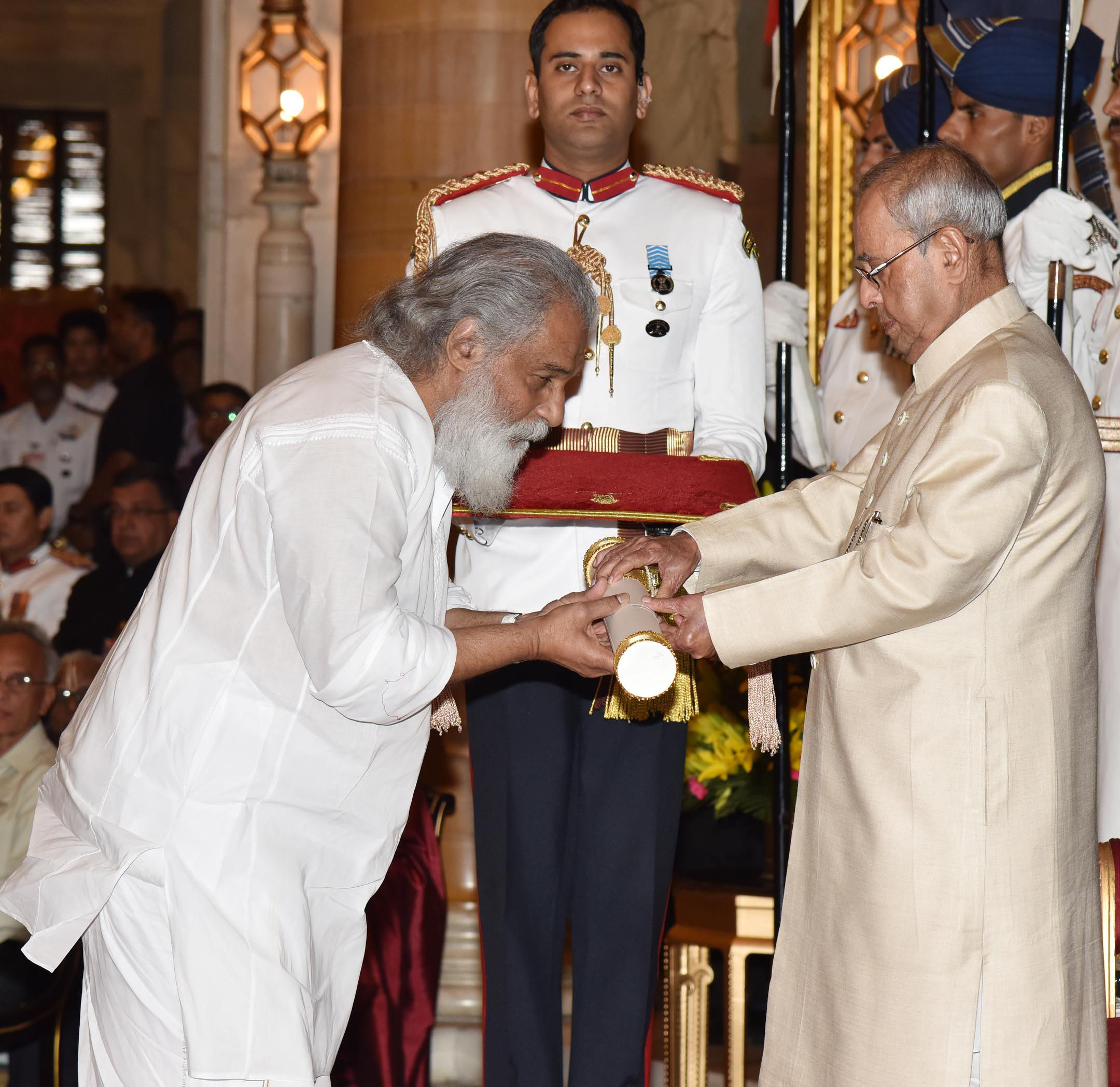
The President, Shri Pranab Mukherjee presenting the Padma Vibhushan Award to Dr. K.J. Yesudas, at the Civil Investiture Ceremony, at Rashtrapati Bhavan, in New Delhi on 13 April 2017

Yesudas has recorded over 50,000 songs and has won scores of accolades including the coveted Padma Shri (1975), Padma Bhushan (2002), Padma Vibhushan (2017) and eight National Awards for Best Playback Singer.

- National Film Award for Best Male Playback Singer a record 8 times by the Government of India
- Kerala State Film Award for Best Singer a record 25 times, J. C. Daniel Award (2002) and Swathi Sangeetha Puraskaram (2010) by the Government of Kerala
- Tamil Nadu State Film Awards 5 times for the best playback singer, Kalaimamani (1986) and M. S. Subbulakshmi Award (2025) by the Government of Tamil Nadu
- Andhra Pradesh State Film Awards 4 times for the best playback singer by the Government of Andhra Pradesh
- Karnataka State Film Awards 2 times for the best playback singer and Karnataka Rajyotsava Award by the Government of Karnataka
- West Bengal State Film Award for the best playback singer by the Government of West Bengal
- Honorary doctorates from Annamalai University, Kerala University and MG University
- Anandalok Best Male Playback Award 1 time for the best playback singer.
- Sangeetha Kalasikhamani, 2002 by The Indian Fine arts Society, Chennai
- Padmabhushan B. Sarojadevi National Award (2015) by Bharathiya Vidya Bhavan, Bangalore.
- Swaralaya Yesudas award is a prestigious award for music artists in recognition of their outstanding performance. The award is instituted jointly by Swaralaya, an organisation that promotes music and Kairali Channel, based in Trivandrum, Kerala. Awards have been given annually since 2000. Yesudas presents the awards at a Gandharva Sandhya every January.

== Admiration ==
In his acceptance speech of winning the Swaralaya Kairali Yesudas Award (2006), AR Rahman said "I'm greatly honoured by Swaralaya's gesture, and getting this award from my most favourite singer Mr Yesudas. He is one of my most favourite voices' ever in the world." On another occasion during an interview he said of Yesudas, "his voice is unmatched, his voice is god given and I've been hearing his songs since I was 3 years old."

Ravindra Jain, in an interview wherein the blind music director confessed that if ever he happened to regain vision, the first person he would like to see would be Yesudas.

In 2003, billionaire and businessman B. R. Shetty gifted him his 1992 model Rolls-Royce Silver Spirit after listening his concert held at The Indian High School, Dubai. Shetty said: "I was not only touched by his concert but by the man himself who talked about God's kindness to mankind".

Bappi Lahiri said in an interview with Filmfare in 2012: "'Yesudas' voice is touched by God. After Kishore Da(Kishore Kumar), he was another singer who brought out the best in me. He is a yogi, a mystic who lives for music. He takes your tunes to another level. And his note is perfect, you can rely on him to deliver it right the first time. Working with him made me touch base with my melodious side. He is vastly under-utilised in Hindi films. I wish Hindi film composers of today realise his genius and offer him assignments."

== Books ==
Several books were published about Yesudas – his autobiography, biography, music journeys, studies on his songs, photos, interviews, memoirs etc. Some includes:

- Yesudasinte Kadha (SPCS – NBS – 1981), Malayalam biography by Mathukutty J. Kunnappally
- Ezhissai Nayakan (Manimekalai Prasuram – 1998), written in Tamil by R. Kandeepan, translated to English by R. Sundaresan.
- Yesudas: the King of Melodies (Manimekalai Prasuram – 2000), written in Tamil by R. Kandeepan, translated to English by R. Sundaresan.
- The Greatest Singer Yesudas (Manimekalai Prasuram – 2005), a biography written in Tamil by R. Kandeepan, translated to English by R. Sundaresan.
- My Life and My Thoughts (Ayaan Publications – 2010), Yesudas' autobiography originally written in Malayalam in the form of articles published in different magazines, compiled and translated to English by K. V. Pisharady.
- Athisayaragam (Mathrubhumi Books – 2011), book written by Ravi Menon traces not just the singer's oeuvre but also the many lives that got intertwined with that of a rising star.
- Das Capital (Mathrubhumi Books – 2011), an autobiography by Subhash Chandran whose life journey through Yesudas.
- Sangeethame Jeevitham (Lipi Publications - 2012), the first comprehensive textbook on Yesudas in Malayalam, written by Kunhikannal Vanimel.
- Yesudas: Oppam Nadanna Camera (Mathrubhumi Books – 2012), collection of photos of Yesudas from 1963 consists more than 150 pictures, mostly in black and white, by P. I. David.
- Swaragandharvam (The New Media Space Books – 2014), a book on the musical journey of Yesudas, written by Saji Sreevalsom.
- Pattinte Palazhi (Saikatham Books – 2017), the complete biography of Yesudas by Mathukutty J. Kunnappally.
- Ithihaasa Gaayakan (Manorama Books - 2020), by Shajan C. Mathew.
- Yesudas: Malayalathinte Swarasagaram (SPCS - NBS - 2021) by S. Saradakkutty, a book published on his 60th year of musical journey, compiling the articles by Yesudas' colleagues, critics and fans.
- Yesudas: Sagarasangeetham (Kerala Bhasha Institute - 2024), a comprehensive book by G. B. Harindranath, celebrating the life and music of Yesudas.

== Controversies ==
On 2 October 2014, Yesudas sparked a row while speaking at a public function on the occasion of Gandhi Jayanti, where he stated that "Women should not wear dress that trouble others. You should dress modestly and do not behave like men". This resulted in a number of protests from Women's Rights and political organisations, who asked him to withdraw the comment.

== Filmography ==
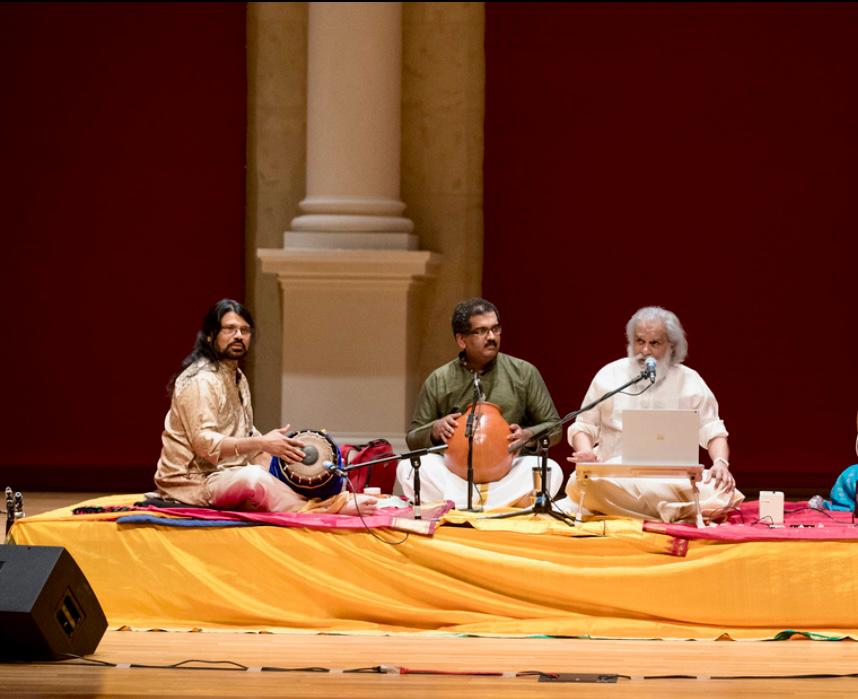
A Classical Carnatic Concert of K J Yesudas

=== As actor ===
Year	Film	Role	Language
1965	Kavyamela	as himself	Malayalam
1966	Kayamkulam Kochunni	as Khader	Malayalam
1966	Anarkali	as Tansen	Malayalam
1973	Achaani	as singer	Malayalam
1976	Adhirshtam Azhaikkirathu	as singer	Tamil
1977	Nirakudam	as singer	Malayalam
1977	Harshabashpam	as singer	Malayalam
1980	Saranam Ayyappa	as singer	Tamil
1981	Pathira Sooryan	as saint	Malayalam
2002	Nandanam	as himself	Malayalam
2005	Boyy Friend	as himself	Malayalam
2012	Theruvu Nakshatrangal	as himself	Malayalam
2018	Kinar / Keni	as singer	Malayalam / Tamil

=== As music composer ===
- Azhakulla Saleena (1973)
- Theekkanal (1976)
- Sanchari (1981)
- Abhinayam (1981)
- Poocha Sanyasi (1981)
- Ellaam Ayyappan (1988)

== See also ==
- Swaralaya Yesudas Award
- List of Carnatic singers
- Harivarasanam
