= List of Janya ragas =

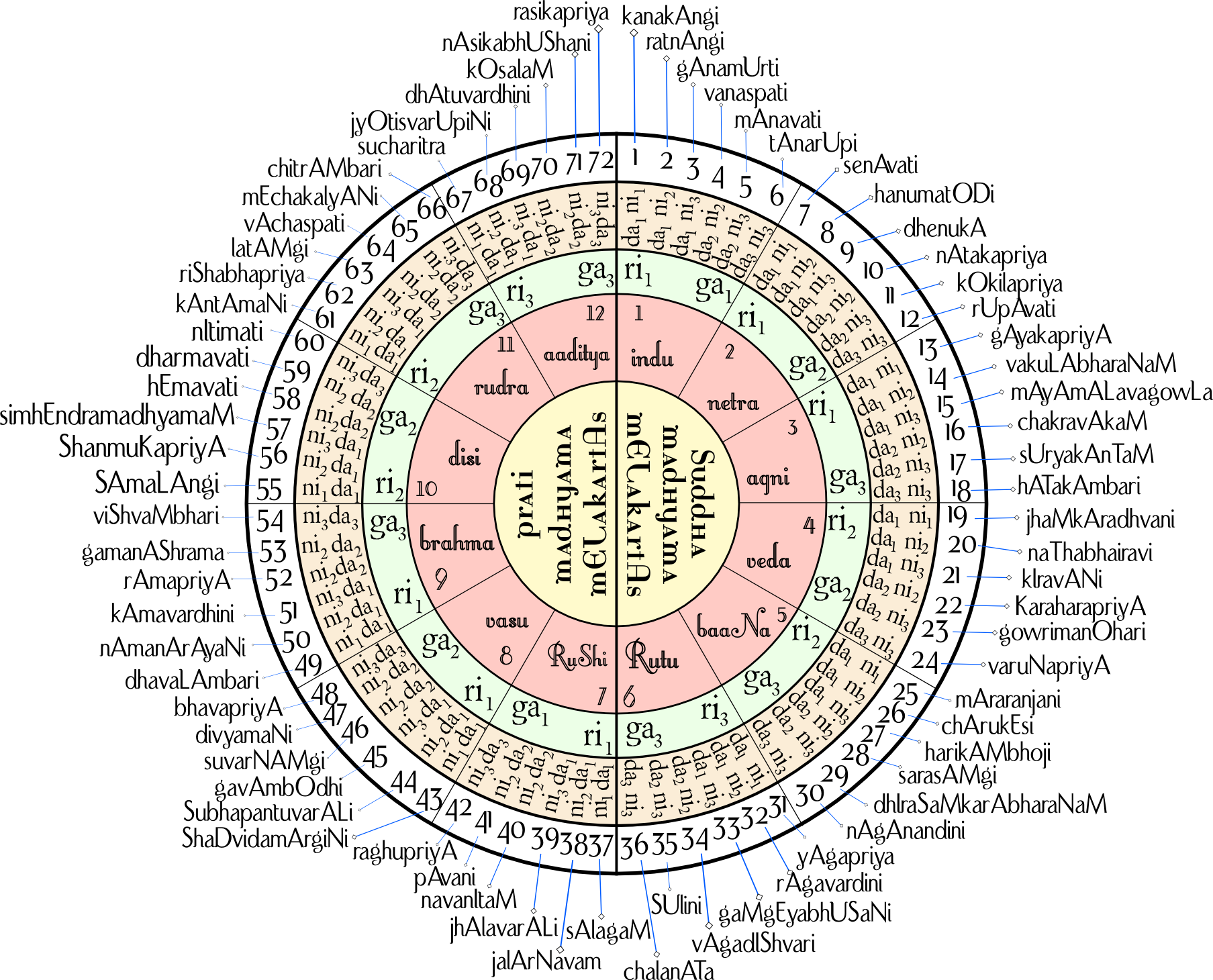
Melakarta Ragas

Janya ragas are Carnatic music ragas derived from the fundamental set of 72 ragas called Melakarta ragas, by the permutation and combination of the various ascending and descending notes. The process of deriving janya ragas from the parent melakartas is complex and leads to an open mathematical possibility of around thirty thousand ragas. Though limited by the necessity of the existence of individual swaroopas (unique identities) for the janya ragas, a list is never comprehensive or exhaustive. Thus the list below is open to additions or corrections. Moreover, some musicians experiment and use new scales, leading to new janya ragas. The 72 Melakarta ragas are numbered according to the ancient Indian system for numerical notation — the Katapayadi system.

The melakartas are listed by numbers 1-72, with corresponding asampoorna melakarta names and scales listed just below (if different, in bold). Under those musical scales are the janyas associated with each melakarta. If the raga has multiple scales in the same janya, these are given below the main scale. Other janya ragas that are either not associated with a melakarta or whose scales are not yet added in this list, are listed at the bottom.

== Scales ==
Raga Name	Ascending Scale (ārohanam)	Descending Scale (avarohanam)
**1 Kanakāngi (Janaka raga)**	S R₁ G₁ M₁ P D₁ N₁ Ṡ	Ṡ N₁ D₁ P M₁ G₁ R₁ S
**Kanakāmbari**	S R₁ M₁ P D₁ Ṡ	Ṡ N₁ D₁ P M₁ G₁ R₁ S
Kanakatodi	S R₁ G₁ M₁ P D₁ Ṡ	Ṡ N₁ D₁ P M₁ R₁ S
Mādhavapriyā	S R₁ G₁ P D₁ N₁ Ṡ	Ṡ N₁ D₁ P G₁ R₁ S
Karnātaka Shuddha Sāveri	S R₁ M₁ P D₁ Ṡ	Ṡ D₁ P M₁ R₁ S
Latantapriya	S R₁ G₁ M₁ P D₁ Ṡ	Ṡ D₁ P M₁ R₁ S
Lavangi(Raga created by M. Balamuralikrishna)	S R₁ M₁ D₁ Ṡ	Ṡ D₁ M₁ R₁ S
Megha	S R₁ M₁ P D₁ N₁ D₁ P Ṡ	Ṡ N₁ D₁ P M₁ R₁ S
Rishabhavilāsa	S R₁ M₁ P D₁ Ṡ	Ṡ D₁ P M₁ R₁ M₁ R₁ S
Sarvashree	S M₁ P Ṡ	Ṡ P M₁ S
Suddha Mukhāri	S R₁ M₁ P D₁ Ṡ	Ṡ N₁ D₁ P M₁ G₁ R₁ S
Tatillatika	S R₁ M₁ P D₁ Ṡ	Ṡ D₁ P M₁ R₁ S
Vāgeeshwari	S R₁ G₁ M₁ P D₁ Ṡ	Ṡ D₁ M₁ P G₁ R₁ S
**2 Ratnāngi**	S R₁ G₁ M₁ P D₁ N₂ Ṡ	Ṡ N₂ D₁ P M₁ G₁ R₁ S
**Phenadhyuti**	S R₁ M₁ P D₁ P N₂ Ṡ	Ṡ N₂ D₁ P M₁ G₁ R₁ S
Ganamukhāri	S R₁ M₁ D₁ Ṡ	Ṡ N₂ D₁ M₁ R₁ S
Ratnavarāli	S R₁ M₁ P N₂ D₁ Ṡ	Ṡ N₂ P M₁ R₁ G₁ R₁ S
Revati	S R₁ M₁ P N₂ Ṡ	Ṡ N₂ P M₁ R₁ S
Shreemani	S R₁ G₁ P D₁ Ṡ	Ṡ N₂ D₁ P G₁ R₁ S
Shreemati	S R₁ G₁ P D₁ Ṡ	Ṡ N₂ D₁ P G₁ R₁ S
Svadhya	S R₁ M₁ P N₂ Ṡ	Ṡ N₂ D₁ P M₁ R₁ S
**3 Gānamūrti**	S R₁ G₁ M₁ P D₁ N₃ Ṡ	Ṡ N₃ D₁ P M₁ G₁ R₁ S
**Gānasāmavarāli**	S R₁ M₁ P D₁ N₃ Ṡ	Ṡ N₃ D₁ P M₁ G₁ R₁ S
Bhinnapanchamam	S R₁ G₁ M₁ P D₁ N₃ Ṡ	Ṡ N₃ D₁ P M₁ G₁ R₁ S
Nādharanjani	S R₁ M₁ D₁ N₃ Ṡ	Ṡ N₃ D₁ M₁ G₁ R₁ S
Poorvavarāli	S R₁ M₁ P D₁ Ṡ	Ṡ N₃ D₁ P M₁ G₁ R₁ S
Sāmavarāli	S R₁ M₁ P D₁ N₃ Ṡ	Ṡ N₃ D₁ P M₁ G₁ R₁ G₁ S
**4 Vanaspati**	S R₁ G₁ M₁ P D₂ N₂ Ṡ	Ṡ N₂ D₂ P M₁ G₁ R₁ S
**Bhānumati**	N₂ S M₁ P N₂ Ṡ	Ṡ N₂ D₂ P M₁ G₂ R₂ S
Rasāli	S R₁ M₁ P D₂ N₂ Ṡ	Ṡ D₂ P M₁ R₁ S
Vanāvali	S R₁ M₁ P D₂ N₂ Ṡ	Ṡ D₂ P M₁ R₁ S
Vittalapriya	S R₁ M₁ P D₂ Ṡ	Ṡ D₂ P M₁ R₁ S
**5 Mānavati**	S R₁ G₁ M₁ P D₂ N₃ Ṡ	Ṡ N₃ D₂ P M₁ G₁ R₁ S
**Manoranjani**	S R₁ M₁ P D₂ N₃ Ṡ	Ṡ N₃ D₂ P M₁ G₁ R₁ S
Ghanashyāmalā	S G₁ M₁ P D₂ Ṡ	Ṡ D₂ N₃ P M₁ G₁ R₁ S
Kunjari	S R₁ M₁ P D₂ P Ṡ	Ṡ N₃ D₂ P M₁ G₁ R₁ S
**6 Tānarūpi**	S R₁ G₁ M₁ P D₃ N₃ Ṡ	Ṡ N₃ D₃ P M₁ G₁ R₁ S
**Tanukeerti**	S R₁ M₁ P N₃ Ṡ	Ṡ N₃ D₃ N₃ P M₁ G₁ M₁ R₁ S
**7 Senāvati**	S R₁ G₂ M₁ P D₁ N₁ Ṡ	Ṡ N₁ D₁ P M₁ G₂ R₁ S
**Senāgrani**	S R₁ G₂ R₁ M₁ G₂ M₁ P N₁ D₁ Ṡ	Ṡ N₁ D₁ P M₁ G₂ M₁ G₂ R₁ S
Bhogi	S G₂ M₁ P D₁ N₁ D₁ Ṡ	Ṡ N₁ D₁ P M₁ G₂ S
Chitthakarshani	S R₁ G₂ M₁ D₁ Ṡ	Ṡ D₁ M₁ G₂ R₁ S
Navarasa Mālā	S R₁ G₂ M₁ P D₁ Ṡ	Ṡ N₁ D₁ P M₁ R₁ S
Sindhu Gowri	S R₁ G₂ M₁ P D₁ N₁ Ṡ	Ṡ N₁ D₁ M₁ G₂ M₁ R₁ S
**8 Hanumatodi**	S R₁ G₂ M₁ P D₁ N₂ Ṡ	Ṡ N₂ D₁ P M₁ G₂ R₁ S
**Janatodi**	S R₁ G₂ M₁ P D₁ N₂ Ṡ	Ṡ N₂ D₁ P M₁ G₂ R₁ S
Āhiri	S R₁ S G₃ M₁ P D₁ N₂ Ṡ	Ṡ N₂ D₁ P M₁ G₃ R₁ S (Anya swara* : R₂ G₂ / G₃ D₂ N₃)
Amrita Dhanyāsi	S R₁ G₂ M₁ P N₂ Ṡ	Ṡ N₂ P M₁ G₂ R₁ S
Asāveri	S R₁ M₁ P D₁ Ṡ	Ṡ N₂ S P D₁ M₁ P R₁ G₂ R₁ S (Anya swara* : R₂)
Bhānuchandrika	S M₁ D₁ N₂ Ṡ	Ṡ N₂ D₁ M₁ G₁ S
Bhadratodi	S R₁ G₂ M₁ D₁ Ṡ	Ṡ N₂ D₁ P G₂ S
Bhoopālam	S R₁ G₂ P D₁ Ṡ	Ṡ D₁ P G₂ R₁ S
Chandrikatodi	S G₂ M₁ P D₁ Ṡ	Ṡ D₁ P M₁ G₂ S
Deshikatodi	S G₂ M₁ P D₁ N₂ Ṡ	Ṡ N₂ D₁ P M₁ G₂ R₁ S
Dhanyāsi	S G₂ M₁ P N₂ Ṡ	Ṡ N₂ D₁ P M₁ G₂ R₁ S
Divyamālati	S G₂ M₁ P D₁ N₂ Ṡ	Ṡ N₂ D₁ P M₁ G₂ S
Ghanta	S G₂ R₂ M₁ P N₂ Ṡ	Ṡ N₂ D₁ P M₁ G₂ R₁ S (Anya swara* : R₂ D₂)
Kalāsāveri	S R₁ G₂ P N₂ Ṡ	Ṡ N₂ P G₂ R₁ S
Kanakasāveri	S R₁ M₁ P D₁ Ṡ	Ṡ N₂ D₁ P M₁ G₂ R₁ S
Nāgavarāli	S R₁ G₂ M₁ P M₁ D₁ N₂ Ṡ	Ṡ N₂ D₁ P M₁ G₂ R₁ S
Prabhupriya	S G₂ M₁ P D₁ Ṡ	Ṡ D₁ P M₁ G₂ S
Punnāgatodi	N₁ S R₁ G₂ M₁ P	P M₁ G₂ R₁ S N₂ D₁
Punnagavarali	N₂ S R₁ G₂ M₁ P D₁ N₂	N₂ D₁ P M₁ G₂ R₁ S N₂ (Anya swara* : R₂)
Shravanamallika	S G₂ M₁ P D₁ N₂ Ṡ	Ṡ N₂ D₁ P M₁ G₂ R₁ S
Sowjanya	S R₁ M₁ D₁ Ṡ	Ṡ D₁ M₁ R₁ S
Shuddha Seemantini	S R₁ G₂ M₁ P D₁ Ṡ	Ṡ D₁ P M₁ G₂ R₁ S
Shuddha Todi	S R₁ G₂ M₁ D₁ N₂ Ṡ	Ṡ N₂ D₁ M₁ G₂ R₁ S
Sindhubhairavi	S R₂ G₂ M₁ G₂ P D₁ N₂ S	N₂ D₁ P M₁ G₂ R₁ S N₂ S (Anya swara* : R₂ G₃ M₂ D₂ N₃)
Srimati	S G₂ R₁ G₂ M₁ P D₁ P D₂ N₂ Ṡ (Anya swara : D₂)	Ṡ N₂ D₁ P M₁ P M₁ G₂ R₁ S
Swarnamalli	S G₂ M₁ P D₁ N₁ Ṡ	Ṡ N₂ D₁ P M₁ G₂ R₁ S
**9 Dhenukā**	S R₁ G₂ M₁ P D₁ N₃ Ṡ	Ṡ N₃ D₁ P M₁ G₂ R₁ S
**Dhunibhinnashadjam**	S R₁ G₂ R₁ P M₁ P N₃ Ṡ	Ṡ D₁ P M₁ G₂ R₁ S
Bhinnashadjam	S R₁ G₂ R₁ P M₁ P N₃ Ṡ	Ṡ D₁ P M₁ G₂ R₁ S
Mohananāta	S G₂ M₁ P D₁ P M₁ P N₃ Ṡ	Ṡ N₃ P D₁ P M₁ G₂ S
Udayaravichandrika	S G₂ M₁ P N₃ Ṡ	Ṡ N₃ P M₁ G₂ S
Vasanthatodi	S R₁ G₂ M₁ D₁ N₃ Ṡ	Ṡ N₃ D₁ M₁ R₁ S
**10 Nātakapriyā**	S R₁ G₂ M₁ P D₂ N₂ Ṡ	Ṡ N₂ D₂ P M₁ G₂ R₁ S
**Natābharanam**	S R₁ G₂ M₁ P D₂ N₂ Ṡ	Ṡ N₂ D₂ P M₁ G₂ R₁ S
Alankārapriya	S R₁ G₂ M₁ D₂ N₂ Ṡ	Ṡ N₂ D₂ M₁ G₂ R₁ S
Bhāgyashabari	S R₁ G₂ M₁ D₂ N₂ Ṡ	Ṡ N₂ D₂ M₁ G₂ R₁ S
Deeparamu	S R₁ G₂ M₁ P D₂ N₂ Ṡ	Ṡ N₂ D₂ N₂ P M₁ G₂ R₁ S
Gunāvati	S R₁ M₁ P D₂ S	S D₂ P M₁ R₁ S
Hindoladeshikam	S M₁ R₁ G₂ M₁ P D₂ N₂ Ṡ	Ṡ P N₂ D₂ M₁ G₂ R₁ S
Kanakadri	S R₁ G₂ P D₂ Ṡ	Ṡ N₂ D₂ P M₁ G₂ R₁ S
Mātangakāmini	S G₂ M₁ P D₁ N₂ Ṡ	Ṡ N₂ D₁ P M₁ G₂ S
Nātyadhārana	S R₁ M₁ P D₂ Ṡ	Ṡ N₂ D₂ P M₁ R₁ S
Niranjana	S R₁ G₂ M₁ P D₂ Ṡ	Ṡ N₂ D₂ P M₁ G₂ R₁ S
Shānthabhāshini	S R₁ G₂ M₁ P D₂ Ṡ	Ṡ N₂ D₂ P M₁ S
Shivashakti	S G₂ M₁ D₂ Ṡ	Ṡ N₂ D₂ M₁ G₂ S
**11 Kokilapriyā**	S R₁ G₂ M₁ P D₂ N₃ Ṡ	Ṡ N₃ D₂ P M₁ G₂ R₁ S
**Kokilāravam**	S R₁ M₁ P D₂ N₃ Ṡ	Ṡ N₃ D₂ P M₁ G₂ R₂ S
Bhimsen (Raga created by Mahesh Mahadev)	S G₂ M₁ P N₃ Ṡ	Ṡ N₃ D₂ P M₁ G₂ R₁ S
Bhakthirasa (Raga created by Rishabh Jagadeesh)	S G₂ M₁ P N₃ Ṡ	Ṡ N₃ P M₁ G₂ S
Chitramani	S R₁ M₁ P D₂ N₃ Ṡ	Ṡ N₃ D₂ P M₁ G₂ R₁ S
Jnānachintāmani	S R₁ M₁ D₂ N₃ Ṡ	Ṡ N₃ D₂ P M₁ R₁ S
Kowmāri	S R₁ G₂ M₁ P D₂ Ṡ	Ṡ N₃ D₂ P M₁ G₂ R₁ S
Shuddha Lalitha	S P M₁ D₂ N₃ Ṡ	Ṡ N₃ S D₂ P M₁ G₂ R₁ S
Vardhani	S G₂ M₁ P M₁ P D₂ N₃ Ṡ	Ṡ N₃ D₂ P M₁ G₂ R₁ S
Vasantamalli	S G₂ M₁ P N₃ Ṡ	Ṡ D₂ P M₁ G₂ S
Vasantanārāyani	S R₁ G₂ M₁ P Ṡ	Ṡ N₃ D₂ P M₁ G₂ R₁ S
**12 Rūpavati**	S R₁ G₂ M₁ P D₃ N₃ Ṡ	Ṡ N₃ D₃ P M₁ G₂ R₁ S
Rowpyanaka	S M₁ P D₃ N₃ Ṡ	Ṡ N₃ P M₁ G₂ R₁ S
Shyāmakalyāni	S M₁ G₂ M₁ P D₃ N₃ Ṡ	Ṡ N₃ P D₃ N₃ P M₁ G₂ R₁ S
**13 Gāyakapriyā**	S R₁ G₃ M₁ P D₁ N₁ Ṡ	Ṡ N₁ D₁ P M₁ G₃ R₁ S
**Geya Hejjajji**	S R₁ M₁ G₃ M₁ P D₁ Ṡ	Ṡ N₃ D₁ P M₁ G₃ R₁ S
Hejjajji	S R₁ G₃ M₁ P D₁ Ṡ	Ṡ N₁ D₁ P M₁ G₃ R₁ S
Kalākānti	S R₁ G₃ M₁ D₁ N₁ Ṡ	Ṡ N₁ D₁ P G₃ R₁ S
Kalkada	S R₁ G₃ P D₁ N₁ S S R₁ G₃ P D₁ Ṡ	Ṡ N₁ D₁ P G₃ R₁ S
Kalpanadhārini	S G₃ M₁ P D₁ Ṡ	Ṡ N₁ D₁ P M₁ G₃ R₁ S
**14 Vakuḷābharaṇam**	S R₁ G₃ M₁ P D₁ N₂ Ṡ	Ṡ N₂ D₁ P M₁ G₃ R₁ S
Āhiri	S R₁ S G₃ M₁ P D₁ N₂ Ṡ	Ṡ N₂ D₁ P M₁ G₃ R₁ S (Anya swara* : R₂ G₂ / G₃ D₂ N₃)
**Vātee Vasantabhairavi**	S R₁ G₃ M₁ D₁ N₂ Ṡ	Ṡ N₂ D₁ M₁ G₃ R₁ S
Amudhasurabhi	S M₁ G₃ M₁ P D₁ Ṡ	Ṡ N₂ D₁ P M₁ R₁ S
Devipriya	S G₃ P N₂ Ṡ	Ṡ N₂ D₁ P M₁ G₃ R₁ S
Kalindaja	S R₁ G₃ M₁ P N₂ Ṡ	Ṡ N₂ P M₁ G₃ R₁ S
Kuvalayabharanam	S R₁ G₃ M₁ D₁ N₁ Ṡ	Ṡ N₁ D₁ M₁ G₃ R₁ S
Mukthipradayini (Raga created by Mahesh Mahadev)	S R₁ G₃ P N₂ Ṡ	Ṡ N₂ P D₁ P G₃ R₁ S
Sallapa	S G₃ M₁ D₁ N₂ Ṡ	Ṡ N₂ D₁ M₁ G₃ S
Soma	S R₁ P M₁ D₁ N₂ Ṡ	Ṡ N₂ D₁ M₁ P M₁ G₃ R₁ S
Sūryā	S G₃ M₁ D₁ N₂ Ṡ	Ṡ N₂ D₁ M₁ G₃ S
Shuddha Kāmbhoji	S G₃ R₁ M₁ P N₂ Ṡ	Ṡ N₂ P M₁ G₃ R₁ S
Vasantabhairavi	S R₁ G₃ M₁ D₁ N₂ Ṡ	Ṡ N₂ D₁ M₁ P M₁ G₃ R₁ S
Vasanta Mukhāri	S M₁ G₃ M₁ P D₁ N₂ Ṡ	Ṡ N₂ D₁ P M₁ G₃ R₁ S
Vijayollāsini	S R₁ G₃ M₁ P M₁ D₁ N₂ Ṡ	Ṡ N₂ D₁ P M₁ G₃ R₁ S
**15 Māyāmāḻavagouḻai**	S R₁ G₃ M₁ P D₁ N₃ Ṡ	Ṡ N₃ D₁ P M₁ G₃ R₁ S
Ardhradesi	S R₁ G₃ M₁ P D₁ N₃ Ṡ	Ṡ D₁ P M₁ G₃ R₁ S
Bhāvini	S G₃ M₁ P D₁ N₃ Ṡ	Ṡ N₃ D₁ P M₁ G₃ S
Bibhās {Hindustani}	S R₁ G₃ P D₁ Ṡ	Ṡ D₁ P M₁ R₁ S
Bowli	S R₁ G₃ P D₁ Ṡ	Ṡ N₃ D₁ P G₃ R₁ S
Bowli Rāmakriya	S R₁ G₃ P D₁ Ṡ	Ṡ N₃ P D₁ P M₁ G₃ R₁ S
Chāruvardhani	S R₁ M₁ P D₁ N₃ Ṡ	Ṡ D₁ P M₁ G₃ R₁ S
Chāyagowla	S R₁ M₁ G₃ M₁ P N₃ Ṡ	Ṡ N₃ D₁ P M₁ G₃ R₁ S
Chandrachooda	S M₁ G₃ M₁ P D₁ Ṡ	Ṡ N₃ D₁ P M₁ G₃ S
Deshyagowla	S R₁ P D₁ N₃ Ṡ	Ṡ N₃ D₁ P R₁ S
Devaranji	S M₁ P D₁ P N₃ Ṡ	Ṡ N₃ D₁ P M₁ S
Ekakshari	S R₁ G₃ M₁ P D₁ N₃ Ṡ	Ṡ N₁ P M₁ R₁ G₃ M₁ R₁ S
Ghanasindhu	S M₁ G₃ M₁ P D₁ N₃ D₁ Ṡ	Ṡ N₃ D₁ P M₁ G₃ R₁ S
Gowla	S R₁ M₁ P N₃ Ṡ	Ṡ N₃ P M₁ R₁ G₃ M₁ R₁ S
Gowlipantu	S R₁ M₁ P N₃ Ṡ	Ṡ N₃ D₁ P M₁ D₁ M₁ G₃ R₁ S
Gowri	S R₁ M₁ P N₃ Ṡ	Ṡ N₃ D₁ P M₁ G₃ R₁ S
Gummakāmbhoji	S R₁ G₃ P D₁ N₃ Ṡ	Ṡ N₃ D₁ P M₁ G₃ R₁ S
Gundakriya	S R₁ M₁ P N₃ Ṡ	Ṡ N₃ P D₁ P M₁ G₃ R₁ S
Gurjari	S R₁ G₃ M₁ P D₁ N₃ Ṡ	Ṡ D₁ N₃ P M₁ G₃ R₁ S
Jaganmohini	S G₃ M₁ P N₃ Ṡ	Ṡ N₃ P M₁ G₃ R₁ S
Kalyānakesari	S R₁ G₃ P D₁ Ṡ	Ṡ D₁ P G₃ R₁ S
Kannadabangāla	S R₁ M₁ G₃ M₁ D₁ P D₁ Ṡ	Ṡ D₁ P M₁ G₃ R₁ S
Karnātaka Sāranga	S R₁ G₃ M₁ P D₁ N₃ Ṡ	Ṡ N₃ D₁ P M₁ R₁ S
Lalitā	S R₁ G₃ M₁ D₁ N₃ Ṡ	Ṡ N₃ D₁ M₁ G₃ R₁ S
Lalitapanchamam	S R₁ G₃ M₁ D₁ N₃ Ṡ	Ṡ N₃ D₁ M₁ P M₁ G₃ R₁ S
Mālavakurinji	S G₃ P D₁ N₃ Ṡ	Ṡ N₃ D₁ M₁ R₁ S
Mālavapanchamam	S R₁ G₃ M₁ P N₃ Ṡ	Ṡ N₃ D₁ P M₁ G₃ R₁ S
Mārgadesi	S R₁ G₃ R₁ G₃ D₁ M₁ P D₁ Ṡ	Ṡ D₁ P M₁ G₃ R₁ S
Malahari	S R₁ M₁ P D₁ Ṡ	Ṡ D₁ P M₁ G₃ R₁ S
Mallikavasantam	S G₃ M₁ P N₃ Ṡ	Ṡ N₃ D₁ P M₁ G₃ R₁ S
Mangalakaishiki	S R₁ M₁ G₃ D₁ P Ṡ	Ṡ N₃ D₁ P M₁ G₃ R₁ S
Manolayam	S R₁ M₁ P D₁ Ṡ	Ṡ N₃ D₁ P M₁ R₁ S
Maruva	S G₃ M₁ D₁ N₃ Ṡ	Ṡ N₃ D₁ P G₃ M₁ G₃ R₁ S R₁ G₃ R₁ S
Mechabowli	S R₁ G₃ P D₁ Ṡ	Ṡ N₃ D₁ P M₁ G₃ R₁ S
Megharanjani	S R₁ G₃ M₁ N₃ Ṡ	Ṡ N₃ M₁ G₃ R₁ S
Nadanamakriya	S R₁ G₃ M₁ P D₁ N₃	N₃ D₁ P M₁ G₃ R₁ S N₃
Pādi	S R₁ M₁ P N₃ Ṡ	Ṡ N₃ P D₁ P M₁ R₁ S
Pharaju (Paras) {Hindustani}	S G₃ M₁ P D₁ N₃ Ṡ	Ṡ N₃ D₁ P M₁ G₃ R₁ S
Poornalalita	S R₁ G₃ M₁ P D₁ Ṡ	Ṡ D₁ P M₁ G₃ R₁ S
Poorvi	S R₁ G₃ M₁ D₁ N₃ Ṡ	Ṡ N₃ D₁ P M₁ G₃ R₁ S
Poorvikavasanta	S M₁ G₃ M₁ D N₃ Ṡ	Ṡ N₃ D₁ M₁ P M₁ G₃ R₁ S
Pratāpadhanyāsi	S G₃ M₁ P N₃ Ṡ	Ṡ N₃ D₁ P M₁ G₃ R₁ S
Pratāparanjani	S R₁ M₁ P D₁ N₃ Ṡ	Ṡ N₃ D₁ P M₁ G₃ R₁ S
Puranirmai	S R₁ G₃ P D₁ Ṡ	Ṡ N₃ D₁ P G₃ R₁ S
Rāmakali	S R₁ G₃ P D₁ Ṡ	Ṡ N₃ D₁ P M₁ G₃ R₁ S
Rāmakriya	S G₃ M₁ P D₁ N₃ Ṡ	Ṡ N₃ P D₁ P M₁ G₃ R₁ S
Revagupti	S R₁ G₃ P D₁ Ṡ	Ṡ D₁ P G₃ R₁ S
Rukhmāmbari	S R₁ G₃ P N₃ Ṡ	Ṡ N₃ P G₃ R₁ S
Sāmantadeepara	S R₁ G₃ M₁ P N₃ Ṡ	Ṡ N₃ P M₁ G₃ R₁ S
Sāranga Nāta	S R₁ M₁ P D₁ Ṡ	Ṡ N₃ S D₁ P M₁ G₃ R₁ S
Sāveri	S R₁ M₁ P D₁ Ṡ	Ṡ N₃ D₁ P M₁ G₃ R₁ S
Salanganāta	S R₁ M₁ P D₁ Ṡ	Ṡ D₁ P G₃ R₁ S
Satyāvati	S G₃ R₁ G₃ P D₁ Ṡ	Ṡ N₃ D₁ N₃ P D₁ P G₃ R₁ S
Sindhu Rāmakriya	S G₃ M₁ P D₁ N₃ Ṡ	Ṡ N₃ P M₁ G₃ R₁ G₃ S
Surasindhu	S M₁ G₃ M₁ P D₁ N₃ D₁ Ṡ	Ṡ N₃ D₁ P M₁ R₁ G₃ R₁ S
Tārakagowla	S G₃ M₁ D₁ N₃ Ṡ	Ṡ N₃ D₁ M₁ G₃ S
Takka	S R₁ S G₃ M₁ G₃ P M₁ D₁ N₃ Ṡ	Ṡ N₃ D₁ P M₁ G₃ R₁ S
Ushāvali	S R₁ M₁ P D₁ Ṡ	Ṡ N₃ D₁ M₁ P M₁ R₁ S
Vishārada	S R₁ M₁ P N₃ Ṡ	Ṡ N₃ P M₁ R₁ S
**16 Chakravākam**	S R₁ G₃ M₁ P D₂ N₂ Ṡ	Ṡ N₂ D₂ P M₁ G₃ R₁ S
**Toyavegavāhini**	S R₁ G₃ M₁ P D₂ N₂ Ṡ	Ṡ N₂ D₂ P M₁ G₃ R₁ S
Āhir Bhairavi	S R₁ G₃ M₁ P N₂ D₂ M₁ P D₂ Ṡ	Ṡ N₂ D₂ P M₁ P G₃ R₁ S
Bhakthapriya	S G₃ M₁ P D₂ N₂ Ṡ	Ṡ N₂ D₂ P M₁ R₁ M₁ G₃ S
Bhujāngini	S R₁ G₃ M₁ D₂ N₂ Ṡ	Ṡ N₂ D₂ M₁ G₃ R₁ S
Bindhumālini	S G₃ R₁ G₃ M₁ P N₂ Ṡ	Ṡ N₂ S D₂ P G₃ M₁ P G₃ R₁ S
Chakranārāyani	S R₁ M₁ P D₂ N₂ Ṡ	Ṡ N₂ D₂ P M₁ R₁ S
Ghoshini	S M₁ G₃ M₁ P D₂ N₂ D₂ Ṡ	Ṡ N₂ D₂ P M₁ G₃ R₁ S
Guhapriya	S R₁ G₃ M₁ P P M₁ D₂ N₂ Ṡ	Ṡ N₂ D₂ P M₁ G₃ S R₁ S
Kalāvati	S R₁ M₁ P D₂ Ṡ	Ṡ D₂ P M₁ G₃ S R₁ S
Kokilā	S R₁ G₃ M₁ D₂ N₂ Ṡ	Ṡ N₂ D₂ M₁ G₃ R₁ S
Malayamārutam	S R₁ G₃ P D₂ N₂ Ṡ	Ṡ N₂ D₂ P G₃ R₁ S
Mukthāngi	S R₁ G₃ M₁ P D₂ N₂ Ṡ	Ṡ D₂ N₂ P M₁ G₃ R₁ S
Mukundamālini	S R₁ G₂ P D₂ Ṡ	Ṡ D₂ P G₂ R₁ S
Pravritti	S G₃ M₁ P D₂ N₂ Ṡ	Ṡ N₂ D₂ P M₁ G₃ S
Rāgamanjari	S R₁ M₁ P D₂ Ṡ	Ṡ N₂ D₂ M₁ R₁ S
Rasikaranjani	S R₁ G₃ P Ṡ	Ṡ D₂ P G₃ R₁ S
Rudra Panchami	S G₃ M₁ D₂ N₂ Ṡ	Ṡ N₃ D₂ M₁ G₃ R₁ S
Samya (Raga created by Mahesh Mahadev)	S R₁ G₃ P N₂ Ṡ	Ṡ N₂ P M₁ G₃ R₁ S
Shree Nabhomārgini	S G₃ M₁ P D₂ N₂ Ṡ	Ṡ D₂ P M₁ G₃ R₁ S
Shyāmali	S G₃ P D₂ N₂ Ṡ	Ṡ N₂ D₂ P G₃ R₁ S
Subhāshini	S D₂ N₂ D R₁ G₃ M₁ P	M₁ G₃ R₁ S N₂ D₂ N₂ S
Valaji	S G₃ P D₂ N₂ Ṡ	Ṡ N₂ D₂ P G₃ S
Veenadhāri	S R₁ G₃ P D₂ N₂ Ṡ	Ṡ N₂ D₂ P M₁ G₃ R₁ S
Vegavāhini	S R₁ G₃ M₁ D₂ N₂ D₂ Ṡ	Ṡ N₂ D₂ P M₁ G₃ R₁ S
**17 Sūryakāntam**	S R₁ G₃ M₁ P D₂ N₃ Ṡ	Ṡ N₃ D₂ P M₁ G₃ R₁ S
**Chāyāvathi**	S R₁ G₃ M₁ D₂ N₃ Ṡ	Ṡ N₃ D₂ P M₁ G₃ R₁ S
Bhairavam	S R₁ G₃ M₁ P D₂ N₃ Ṡ	Ṡ D₂ P M₁ G₃ R₁ S
Haridarpa	S R₁ G₃ M₁ P D₂ N₃ Ṡ	Ṡ D₂ P M₁ R₁ S
Jayasamvardhani	S G₃ M₁ P D₂ N₃ Ṡ	Ṡ N₃ P M₁ G₃ R₁ S
Jeevantikā	S R₁ M₁ P D₂ N₃ Ṡ	Ṡ N₃ D₂ P M₁ R₁ S
Kusumamāruta	S M₁ P D₂ N₃ Ṡ	Ṡ N₃ D₂ P M₁ G₃ R₁ G₃ M₁ S
Nāgachooḍāmani	S R₁ G₃ M₁ P D₂ Ṡ	Ṡ D₂ N₂ D₂ P M₁ G₃ M₁ R₂ S
Rohini	S R₁ G₃ M₁ M₂ D₂ N₃ Ṡ	Ṡ N₃ D₂ M₂ M₁ G₃ R₁ S
Sāmakannada	S R₂ M₁ G₂ M₁ P D₂ N₃ Ṡ	Ṡ N₃ D₂ P M₁ R₁ S
Sowrāshtram	S R₁ G₃ M₁ P M₁ D₂ N₃ Ṡ	Ṡ N₃ D₂ N₂ D₂ P M₁ G₃ R₁ S
Suddha Gowla	S R₁ M₁ P N₃ Ṡ	Ṡ N₃ P M₁ R₁ S
Supradeepam	S R₁ M₁ P D₂ N₃ Ṡ	Ṡ N₃ D₂ P M₁ G₃ M₁ R₁ S
Vasanthā	S M₁ G₃ M₁ D₂ N₃ Ṡ	Ṡ N₃ D₂ M₁ G₃ R₁ S
**18 Hātakāmbari**	S R₁ G₃ M₁ P D₃ N₃ Ṡ	Ṡ N₃ D₃ P M₁ G₃ R₁ S
**Jayashuddhamālavi**	S R₁ G₃ M₁ P N₃ Ṡ	Ṡ N₃ D₃ P M₁ G₃ R₁ S
Hamsanantini	S G₃ M₁ P Ṡ	Ṡ P M₁ G₃ R₁ S
Kallola	S P D₃ N₃ Ṡ	Ṡ N₃ D₃ P M₁ G₃ R₁ S
Simhala	S R₁ G₃ M₁ P D₃ N₃ Ṡ	Ṡ N₃ D₃ N₃ P M₁ G₃ R₁ S
**19 Jhankāradhvani**	S R₂ G₂ M₁ P D₁ N₁ Ṡ	Ṡ N₁ D₁ P M₁ G₂ R₂ S
**Jhankārabhramari**	S R₂ G₂ M₁ P D₁ N₁ D₁ P D₁ S S R₂ G₂ M₁ P D₁ S S R₂ G₂ M₁ P D₁ N₁ D₁ S S R₂ G₂ M₁ P D₁ N₁ D₁ S S G₂ R₂ G M₁ P D₁ N₁ D₁ S S R₂ G₂ M₁ P D₁ N₁ D₁ S	S N₁ D₁ P M₁ G₂ R₂ S S N₁ D₁ P M₁ G₂ R₂ S S D₁ P M₁ G₂ R₂ S S N₁ D₁ P M₁ G₂ R₂ S S N₁ D₁ P M₁ G₂ R₂ G R₂ S D₁ N₁ D₁ P M₁ G₂ R₂ S
Bhārati	S R₂ G₂ M₁ P Ṡ	Ṡ P M₁ G₂ R₂ S
Chittaranjani	S R₂ G₂ M₁ P D₁ N₁	N₁ D₁ P M₁ G₂ R₂ S
Jalmika	S R₂ G₁ M₁ P D₁ N₁ Ṡ	Ṡ N₁ D₁ P M₁ G₁ S R₂ S
Lalitabhairavi	S G₂ M₁ P D₁ Ṡ	Ṡ N₁ D₁ P M₁ G₂ R₂ S
Poornalalita	S G₂ R₂ M₁ P S S G₂ R₂ G₂ R₂ M₁ P S S R₂ G₂ R₂ M₁ P S S R₂ G₂ M₁ P S S G₂ R₂ G₂ M₁ P S	S N₁ D₁ P M₁ G₂ R₂ S S N₁ D₁ P M₁ G₂ R₂ S S N₁ D₁ P M₁ G₂ R₂ S S N₁ D₁ P M₁ G₂ R₂ S S N₁ D₁ P M₁ G₂ R₂ S
**20 Natabhairavi**	S R₂ G₂ M₁ P D₁ N₂ Ṡ	Ṡ N₂ D₁ P M₁ G₂ R₂ S
**Nārērētigowla**	S G₂ R₂ G₂ M₁ N₂ D₁ M₁ N₂ N₂ Ṡ	Ṡ N₂ D₁ M₁ G₂ M₁ P M₁ G₂ R₂ S
Abheri (Dikshitar School)	S M₁ G₂ M₁ P P Ṡ	Ṡ N₂ D₂ P M₁ G₂ R₂ S
Anandabhairavi	S G₂ R₂ G₂ M₁ P D₂ P Ṡ	Ṡ N₂ D₂ P M₁ G₂ R₂ S (Anya swara* : G₃ D₁ N₃)
Amrithavāhini	S R₂ M₁ P D₁ N₂ Ṡ	Ṡ N₂ D₁ M₁ G₂ R₂ S
Bhairavi	S G₂ R₂ G₂ M₁ P D₂ N₂ Ṡ	Ṡ N₂ D₁ P M₁ G₂ R₂ S (Anya swara* : D₂)
Bhuvanagāndhāri	S R₂ M₁ P N₂ Ṡ	Ṡ N₂ D₁ P M₁ G₂ S
Chapagantarva	S G₂ M₁ P N₂	D₁ M₁ G₂ R₂ S N₂
Darbāri Kānada	N₂ S R₂ G₂ R₂ S M₁ P D₁ N₂ Ṡ	Ṡ D₁ N₂ P M₁ P G₂ M₁ R₂ S
Devakriya	S R₂ M₁ P N₂ Ṡ	Ṡ N₂ D₁ N₂ P M₁ G₂ R₂ S
Dhanashree	N₂ S G₂ M₁ P N₂ Ṡ	Ṡ N₂ D₁ P M₁ G₂ R₁ S
Dharmaprakāshini	S R₂ M₁ P N₂ Ṡ	Ṡ N₂ D₁ M₁ G₂ R₂ S
Dilipika Vasantha	S G₂ M₁ P D₁ P N₂ Ṡ	Ṡ D₁ P M₁ R₂ S
Divyagāndhāri	S G₂ M₁ P D₁ N₂ Ṡ	Ṡ N₂ P M₁ G₂ S
Gopikāvasantam	S R₂ G₂ M₁ P D₁ P N₂	S N₂ D₁ P M₁ G₂ R₂ S
Hindolam	S G₂ M₁ D₁ N₂ Ṡ	Ṡ N₂ D₁ M₁ G₂ S
Hindolavasanta	S G₂ M₁ P D₁ N₂ D₁ Ṡ	Ṡ N₂ D₁ P M₁ D₂ M₁ G₂ S
Indughantarava	S G₂ M₁ P D₁ P	N₂ D₁ P M₁ G₂ R₂ S N₂
Jayanthashrī	S G₂ M₁ D₁ N₂ Ṡ	Ṡ N₂ D₁ M₁ P M₁ G₂ S
Jingaḷa	S R₂ G₂ M₁ P D₁ N₂ D₁ P Ṡ	Ṡ N₂ D₁ P M₁ G₂ R₂ S
Jaunpuri {Hindustani}	S R₂ M₁ P D₁ N₂ Ṡ	Ṡ N₂ D₁ P M₁ G₂ R₂ S
Kātyāyani	S R₂ G₂ P D₁ Ṡ	Ṡ D₁ P G₂ R₂ S
Kamakhyapriya (Raga created by Mahesh Mahadev)	S R₂ M₁ P D₁ N₂ Ṡ	Ṡ N₂ P M₁ G₂ R₂ S
Kanakavasantham	S G₂ M₁ P N₂ D₁ Ṡ	Ṡ N₂ D₁ P M₁ G₂ R₂ S
Kshanika	S G₂ M₁ P D₁ Ṡ	Ṡ D₁ P M₁ G₂ S
Mānji	S R₂ G₂ M₁ P D₂ N₂ Ṡ	Ṡ N₂ D₁ P M₁ P M₁ P G₂ R₂ S
Mahati cf. Mela 28&43 (Mahathi)	S G₂ P D₁ N₂ Ṡ	Ṡ N₂ P G₂ R₂ S
Malkosh / Malkauns	S G₂ M₁ D₁ N₂ Ṡ	Ṡ N₂ D₁ M₁ G₂ S
mArgahindOLaM	S R₂ G₂ M₁ P D₂ N₂ Ṡ	Ṡ N₂ D₂ P M₁ G₂ S
Nāgagāndhāri	S R₂ M₁ G₂ M₁ P D₁ N₂ Ṡ	Ṡ N₂ D₁ P M₁ G₂ R₂ S
Navarathna Vilāsam	S R₂ G₂ M₁ P D₁ P Ṡ	Ṡ D₁ P M₁ G₂ M₁ R₂ S
Nīlamati	S G₂ M₁ P D₁ N₂ Ṡ	Ṡ N₂ D₁ M₁ G₂ S
Nīlaveni	S R₂ G₂ M₁ P D₁ N₂ D₁ Ṡ	Ṡ D₁ P M₁ G₂ R₂ S
Poornashađjam	S R₂ G₂ M₁ N₂ N₂ S S R₂ G₂ M₁ N₂ Ṡ	Ṡ N₂ P M₁ G₂ R₂ S S N₂ P M₁ G₂ R₂ S
Rājarājeshwari	S R₂ M₁ P D₁ Ṡ	Ṡ N₂ D₁ P M₁ G₂ R₂ S
Sāramati	S R₂ G₂ M₁ P D₁ N₂ Ṡ	Ṡ N₂ D₁ M₁ G₂ S
Sāranga Kāpi	S R₁ P M₁ R₁ P R₁ M₁ P N₂ Ṡ	Ṡ N₂ D₁ P M₁ G₂ R₁ S
Sharadapriya	S R₂ G₂ P N₂ Ṡ	Ṡ N₂ P G₂ R₂ S
Shree Navarasachandrika	S R₂ G₂ M₁ P D₁ Ṡ	Ṡ D₁ P M₁ G₂ R₂ S
Sindhu Dhanyāsi	S G₂ M₁ P N₂ Ṡ	Ṡ N₂ D₁ M₁ P M₁ G₂ R₂ S
Shuddha Desi	S R₂ G₂ R₂ M₁ P D₁ N₂ Ṡ	Ṡ N₂ D₁ P M₁ G₂ R₂ S
Shuddha Sālavi	S G₂ M₁ P N₂ Ṡ	Ṡ N₂ P M₁ R₂ S
Sukumāri	S G₂ M₁ P N₂ D₁ N₂ Ṡ	Ṡ N₂ P M₁ G₂ M₁ R₂ S
Sushama (Raga created by M. Balamuralikrishna)	S R₂ M₁ P D₁ Ṡ	Ṡ D₁ P M₁ R₂ S
Sutradhāri	S R₂ M₁ P D₁ S	S D₁ P M₁ R₂ S
Tarkshika	S R₂ M₁ P N₂ Ṡ	Ṡ N₂ D₁ P M₁ R₂ G₂ R₂ S
Udayarāga	S G₂ M₁ P N₂ Ṡ	Ṡ N₂ P M₁ G₂ S
Vasantavarāli	S R₂ M₁ P D₁ Ṡ	Ṡ N₂ D₁ P G₂ R₂ S
**21 Kīravāṇi**	S R₂ G₂ M₁ P D₁ N₃ Ṡ	Ṡ N₃ D₁ P M₁ G₂ R₂ S
**Keeranāvali**	S R₂ G₂ M₁ P D₁ N₃ Ṡ	Ṡ P M₁ G₂ R₂ S
Aymmukhan	S G₂ M₁ P D₁ N₃ Ṡ	Ṡ N₃ D₁ P M₁ G₂ S
Bhānupriya	S R₂ G₂ D₁ N₃ Ṡ	Ṡ N₃ D₁ G₂ R₂ S
Beethovanapriya (invented by Ramesh Vinayakam)	G̣₂ P̣ Ṇ₃ S R₂ G₂ M₁ P D₁	P M₂ P R₂ M₁ G₂ S
Chandrika	S R₂ G₂ P D₁ N₃ Ṡ	Ṡ N₃ D₁ P G₂ R₂ S
Gaganabhoopālam	S M₁ G₂ M₁ P D₁ N₃	S N₃ D₁ M₁ G₂ R₂ S
Hamsapancama	S G₂ M₁ P N₃ D₁ N₃ P Ṡ	Ṡ N₃ D₁ M₁ G₂ R₂ S
Hamsavāhini	S R₂ M₁ P D₁ N₃ Ṡ	Ṡ N₃ D₁ P M₁ R₂ S
Jayashree	S R₂ G₂ M₁ P D₁ N₃ D₁ Ṡ	Ṡ N₃ D₁ P M₁ G₂ R₂ S
Kadaram (Chandrakosh, Chandrakauns, Chandrakaush)	S G₂ M₁ D₁ N₃ Ṡ	Ṡ N₃ D₁ M₁ G₂ S
Kalyāna Vasantam	S G₂ M₁ D₁ N₃ Ṡ	Ṡ N₃ D₁ P M₁ G₂ R₂ S
Kusumāvali	S G₂ M₁ P D₁ Ṡ	Ṡ N₃ D₁ P M₁ G₂ M₁ R₁ S
Mādhavi	S M₁ G₂ M₁ P D₁ N₃ Ṡ	Ṡ N₃ D₁ P M₁ S M₁ G₂ R₁ S
Mishramanolayam	S R₂ M₁ P D₁ Ṡ	Ṡ D₂ D₁ P M₁ R₂ S
Priyadarshani	S R₂ M₁ D₁ N₃ Ṡ	Ṡ N₃ D₁ M₁ R₂ S
Rishipriya	S R₂ G₂ M₁ P D₁ N₃ Ṡ	Ṡ N₃ P M₁ G₂ R₂ S
Sāmapriya	S R₂ M₁ P D₁ Ṡ	Ṡ D₁ P M₁ R₂ S
Shrothasvini	S G₂ M₁ P N₃ Ṡ	Ṡ N₃ P M₁ G₂ S
Vasanthamanohari	S R₂ G₂ M₁ D₁ N₃ Ṡ	Ṡ N₃ D₁ M₁ G₂ R₂ S
**22 Kharaharapriyā**	S R₂ G₂ M₁ P D₂ N₂ Ṡ	Ṡ N₂ D₂ P M₁ G₂ R₂ S
**Shree**	S R₂ M₁ P N₂ Ṡ	Ṡ N₂ P D₂ N₂ P M₁ R₂ G₂ R₂ S
Andolikā	S R₂ M₁ P N₂ Ṡ	Ṡ N₂ D₂ M₁ R₂ S
Abheri	S G₂ M₁ P N₂ Ṡ	Ṡ N₂ D₂ P M₁ G₂ R₂ S
Abhogi	S R₂ G₂ M₁ D₂ Ṡ	Ṡ D₂ M₁ G₂ R₂ S
Ādi Kāpi	S R₂ M₁ G₂ M₁ P D₂ N₂ Ṡ	Ṡ N₂ D₂ P M₁ G₂ R₂ S
Āryamati	S R₂ G₂ P D₂ Ṡ	Ṡ N₂ D₂ P D₂ M₁ G₂ R₂ S
Agnikopa	S G₂ M₁ P N₂ Ṡ	Ṡ N₂ P M₁ G₂ R₂ S
Bālachandrika	S G₂ M₁ P D₂ N₂ Ṡ	Ṡ N₂ D₂ M₁ G₂ R₂ S
Basant Bahār {Hindustani}	S M₂ P G₃ M₂ N₃ D₁ N₃ S	R₂ S N₂ D₂ P M₁ G₂ M₁ G₂ R₂ S
Bageshri	S G₂ M₁ D₂ N₂ Ṡ	Ṡ N₂ D₂ M₁ P D₂ G₂ M₁ R₂ S
Bhagavatapriya	S R₂ G₂ M₁ P N₂ Ṡ	Ṡ N₂ D₂ P M₁ G₂ R₂ S
Bhagavathpriya	S R₂ G₂ M₁ R₂ M₁ P D₂ N₂ Ṡ	Ṡ N₂ D₂ P M₁ R₂ S
Bhimpalasi {Hindustani}	N₂ S G₂ M₁ P N₂ Ṡ	Ṡ N₂ D₂ P M₁ G₂ R₂ S
Brindāvana Sāranga {Hindustani}	S R₂ M₁ P N₃ Ṡ	Ṡ N₂ P M₁ R₂ G₂ R₂ S (Anya swara* : N₃)
Brindāvani {Hindustani}	S R₂ M₁ P N₃ Ṡ	Ṡ N₂ P M₁ R₂ S (Anya swara* : N₃)
Chakrapradipta	S R₂ G₂ M₁ P M₁ D₂ N₂ Ṡ	Ṡ N₂ D₂ M₁ G₂ S
Chittaranjani	S R₂ G₂ M₁ P D₂ N₂	N₂ D₂ P M₁ G₂ R₂ S
Darbar	S R₂ M₁ P D₂ N₂ S	R₂ S N₂ S D₂ P M₁ R₂ G₂ G₂ R₂ S
Dayavati	S R₂ G₂ P N₂ Ṡ	Ṡ N₂ P M₁ G₂ S
Devāmruthavarshani	S R₂ G₂ M₁ N₂ D₂ N₂ Ṡ	Ṡ N₂ D₂ P M₁ G₂ R₂ S
Deva Manohari	S R₂ M₁ P D₂ N₂ Ṡ	Ṡ N₂ D₂ N₂ P M₁ R₂ S
Dhanakāpi	S R₂ M₁ P N₂ S (Varies)	S N₂ D₂ N₂ P M₁ G₂ R₂ S
Dilipika	S R₂ G₂ M₁ P N₂ D₂ N₂ P D₂ N₂ Ṡ	Ṡ N₂ D₂ P M₁ G₂ R₂ S
Gowla Kannada	S R₂ G₂ M₁ P D₂ N₂ Ṡ	Ṡ N₂ P M₁ G₂ S
Gāra {Hindustani}	S G₂ M₁ P D₂ N₃ Ṡ	Ṡ N₂ D₂ P M₁ G₃ R₂ G₂ R₂ S N₃ S N₂ D₂ S (Anya swara* : G₃ D₁ N₃)
Hamsa ābheri	S G₂ P M₁ P N₂ Ṡ	Ṡ N₂ D₂ P M₁ G₂ S
Haridasapriya	S P M₁ G₃ M₁ P N₂ Ṡ	Ṡ N₂ D₂ N₂ P M₁ G₂ R₂ S
Harinārāyani	S R₂ G₂ M₁ P M₁ D₂ N₂ Ṡ	Ṡ N₂ P M₁ G₂ R₂ S
Hindustāni Kāpi	S R₂ M₁ P N₂ Ṡ	Ṡ N₂ D₂ N₂ P M₁ G₂ M₁ D₂ P G₂ R₂ S N₂ S (Anya swara* : G₃ D₁ N₃)
Huseni	S R₂ G₂ M₁ P N₂ D₂ N₂ S S R₂ G₃ M₁ P N₃ D₂ M₁ P N₃ Ṡ	Ṡ N₂ D₁ P M₁ G₂ R₂ S (Anya swara* : D₁); S N₃ S P D₂ M₁ P G₃ R₂ S
Jatādhāri	S R₂ M₁ P D₂ N₂ Ṡ	Ṡ N₂ D₂ P M₁ R₂ S
Jayamanohari	S R₂ G₂ M₁ D₂ Ṡ	Ṡ N₂ D₂ M₁ G₂ R₂ S
Jayanārāyani	S R₂ G₂ M₁ P D₂ Ṡ	Ṡ N₂ D₂ P M₁ G₂ R₂ S
Jayanthasena	S G₂ M₁ P D₂ Ṡ	Ṡ N₂ D₂ P M₁ G₂ S
Jog {Hindustani}	S G₃ M₁ P N₂ Ṡ	Ṡ N₂ P M₁ G₃ M₁ G₂ S (Anya swara* : G₂)
Kanadā	S R₂ P G₂ M₁ D₂ N₂ Ṡ	Ṡ N₂ P M₁ G₂ M₁ R₂ S
Kāpi	S R₂ M₁ P N₃ Ṡ	Ṡ N₂ D₂ N₂ P M₁ G₂ R₂ S (Anya swara* : G₃ D₁ N₃)
Kāpijingala	S N₂ S R₂ G₂ M₁	M₁ G₂ R₂ S N₂ D₂ N₂ S
Kalānidhi	S R₂ G₂ M₁ S P M₁ D₂ N₂ Ṡ	Ṡ N₂ D₂ P M₁ G₂ R₂ S
Kalika	S R₂ G₂ P D₂ N₂ Ṡ	Ṡ N₂ D₂ P G₂ R₂ S
Kannadagowla	S R₂ G₂ M₁ P N₂ Ṡ	Ṡ N₂ D₂ P M₁ G₂ S
Karnātaka Hindolam	S G₂ M₁ D₂ N₂ Ṡ	Ṡ N₂ D₂ M₁ G₂ S
Karnātaka Kāpi	S R₂ G₂ M₁ P D₂ N₂ Ṡ	Ṡ N₂ D₂ P M₁ G₂ R₂ S
Karnātaka Devagāndhari	S G₂ M₁ P N₂ Ṡ	Ṡ N₂ D₂ P M₁ G₂ R₂ S
Karnaranjani	S R₂ G₂ M₁ G₂ P D₂ Ṡ	Ṡ N₂ D₂ P M₁ G₂ R₂ S
Kowmodaki	S R₂ G₂ M₁ P D₂ N₂ Ṡ	Ṡ D₂ P G₂ S
Kowshika	S G₂ M₁ D₂ N₂ Ṡ	Ṡ N₂ D₂ M₁ G₂ M₁ R₂ S
Lalitamanohari	S G₂ M₁ P D₂ N₂ Ṡ	Ṡ N₂ P M₁ G₂ R₂ S
Mādhavamanohari	S R₂ G₂ M₁ P N₂ D₂ N₂ Ṡ	Ṡ N₂ D₂ M₁ G₂ R₂ S
Mālavashree	S G₂ M₁ P N₂ D₂ N₂ P D₂ N₂ Ṡ	Ṡ N₂ D₂ P M₁ G₂ R₂ S
Māyapradeeptam	S M₁ G₂ M₁ P D₂ N₂ Ṡ	Ṡ D₂ P M₁ G₂ R₂ S
Madhyamarāvali	S R₂ G₂ P D₂ N₂ Ṡ	Ṡ N₂ D₂ P G₂ R₂ S
Madhyamāvathi	S R₂ M₁ P N₂ Ṡ	Ṡ N₂ P M₁ R₂ S
Mahānandhi	S R₂ G₂ P D₂ Ṡ	Ṡ D₂ P G₂ R₂ S
Mandāmari	S R₂ M₁ P D₂ Ṡ	Ṡ N₂ S D₂ P M₁ G₂ R₂ S
Mangalāvathi	S R₂ M₁ P D₂ Ṡ	Ṡ D₂ P M₁ G₂ R₂ S
Manirangu	S R₂ M₁ P N₂ Ṡ	Ṡ N₂ P M₁ G₂ R₂ S
Manjari	S G₂ R₂ G₂ M₁ P N₂ D₂ N₂ Ṡ	Ṡ N₂ D₂ P M₁ G₂ R₂ S
Manohari	S G₂ R₂ G₂ M₁ P D₂ Ṡ	Ṡ D₂ P M₁ G₂ R₂ S
Manorama	S R₂ G₂ M₁ P D₁ P Ṡ	Ṡ N₂ D₁ P M₁ G₂ R₂ S
Maruvadhanyāsi	S G₂ M₁ P D₂ Ṡ	Ṡ N₂ D₂ P M₁ D₂ M₁ G₂ R₂ S
Mishramanolayam	S R₂ M₁ P D₁ Ṡ	Ṡ D₂ D₁ P M₁ R₂ S
Mishra shivaranjani	S R₂ G₂ P D₂ Ṡ	Ṡ D₂ P G₂ R₂ S (Anya swara* : R₁ G₃ M₁ M₂ D₁ N₂ N₃)
Malhar or Miyān ki Malhār {Hindustani}	S R₂ P M₁ P N₂ D₂ N₃ Ṡ	Ṡ N₂ P M₁ P G₂ M₁ R₂ S (Anya swara* : N₃)
Mukhāri	S R₂ M₁ P N₂ D₂ Ṡ	Ṡ N₂ D₁ P M₁ G₂ R₂ S (Anya swara* : D₁)
Nādachintāmani	S R₂ G₂ M₁ N₂ D₂ N₂ Ṡ	Ṡ N₂ D₂ P M₁ G₂ R₂ S
Nādatārangini	S P M₁ R₂ G₂ Ṡ	Ṡ P N₂ D₂ P M₁ G₂ R₂ G₂ S
Nādavarangini	S P M₁ N₂ D₂ N₂ Ṡ	Ṡ P N₂ D₂ P M₁ G₂ R₂ G₂ S
Nāgari	S R₂ M₁ P D₂ N₂ Ṡ	Ṡ N₂ D₂ P M₁ G₂ S
Nāgavalli	S R₂ M₁ D₂ N₂ Ṡ	Ṡ N₂ D₂ M₁ R₂ S
Nāyaki	S R₂ M₁ P D₂ N₂ D₂ P Ṡ	Ṡ N₂ D₂ P M₁ R₂ G₂ R₂ S
Nigamagāmini	M₁ G₂ S G₂ M₁ N₂ Ṡ	Ṡ N₂ M₁ G₂ M₁ G₂ S
Nirmalāngi	S R₂ M₁ P N₂ Ṡ	Ṡ N₂ P M₁ R₂ S
Omkāri	S R₂ G₂ M₁ P D₂ Ṡ	Ṡ D₂ P M₁ G₂ R₂ S
Panchamam	S R₂ D₂ P N₂ Ṡ	Ṡ N₂ D₂ P M₁ G₂ R₂ S
Phalamanjari	S G₂ M₁ D₂ Ṡ	Ṡ N₂ D₂ P M₁ G₂ M₁ R₂ S
Phalaranjani	S G₂ M₁ P M₁ D₂ Ṡ	Ṡ N₂ D₂ P M₁ G₂ M₁ R₂ S
Pilu(peelu) {Hindustani}	N₃ S G₃ M₁ P N₃ Ṡ	Ṡ N₂ D₂ P D₁ P M₁ G₂ R₂ S N₃ S (Anya swara* : G₃ D₁ N₃)
Poornakalānidhi	S G₂ M₁ P D₂ N₂ Ṡ	Ṡ D₂ P M₁ G₂ R₂ S
Pushpalathika	S R₂ G₂ M₁ P N₂ Ṡ	Ṡ N₂ P M₁ G₂ R₂ S
Ratipatipriya	S R₂ G₂ P N₂ Ṡ	Ṡ N₂ P G₂ R₂ S
Reethigowla	S G₂ R₂ G₂ M₁ N₂ D₂ M₁ N₂ N₂ Ṡ	Ṡ N₂ D₂ M₁ G₂ M₁ P M₁ G₂ R₂ S
Rudrapriyā	S R₂ G₂ M₁ P D₂ N₂ Ṡ	Ṡ N₂ P M₁ G₂ R₂ S
Sahāna (Original)	S R₂ G₂ M₁ P M₁ D₂ N₂ Ṡ	Ṡ N₂ D₂ P M₁ G₂ G₂ R₂ G₂ R₂ S (Anya swara* : G₃)
Sālagabhairavi	S R₂ M₁ P D₂ Ṡ	Ṡ N₂ D₂ P M₁ G₂ R₂ S
Sārang {Hindustani}	S R₂ M₁ P N₂ Ṡ	Ṡ N₂ P M₁ R₂ S
Saindhavi	N₂ D₂ N₂ S R₂ G₂ M₁ P D₂ N₂	D₂ P M₁ G₂ R₂ S N₂ D₂ N₂ S
Sangrama	S R₂ M₁ D₂ N₂ P Ṡ	Ṡ N₂ D₂ G₂ R₂ S
Sankrāndanapriyā	S R₂ G₂ P D₂ Ṡ	Ṡ D₂ P G₂ R₂ S
Sarvachoodāmani	S R₂ M₁ G₂ M₁ P D₂ N₂ Ṡ	Ṡ N₂ P D₂ N₂ D₂ P M₁ G₂ R₂ G₂ R₂ S
Shivapriyā	S R₂ G₂ P D₂ Ṡ	Ṡ D₂ P G₂ R₂ S
Shivaranjani	S R₂ G₂ P D₂ Ṡ	Ṡ D₂ P G₂ R₂ S
Shree Manohari	S G₂ R₂ G₂ M₁ P D₂ Ṡ	Ṡ D₂ P M₁ G₂ R₂ S
Shree Manoranjani	S G₂ M₁ D₂ N₂ Ṡ	Ṡ N₂ D₂ M₁ G₂ R₂ S
Shreeranjani	S R₂ G₂ M₁ D₂ N₂ Ṡ	Ṡ N₂ D₂ M₁ G₂ R₂ S
Siddhasena	S G₂ R₂ G₂ M₁ P D₂ Ṡ	Ṡ N₂ D₂ M₁ P M₁ R₂ G₂ R₂ S
Suddha Bangāla	S R₂ M₁ P D₂ Ṡ	Ṡ D₂ P M₁ R₂ G₂ R₂ S
Suddha Bhairavi	S G₂ M₁ P N₂ D₂ Ṡ	Ṡ N₂ D₂ M₁ G₂ R₂ S
Suddha Dhanyāsi	S G₂ M₁ P N₂ Ṡ	Ṡ N₂ P M₁ G₂ S
Suddha Hindolam (Varamu)	S G₂ M₁ D₂ N₂ Ṡ	Ṡ N₂ D₂ M₁ G₂ S
Suddha Manohari	S R₂ G₂ M₁ P D₂ Ṡ	Ṡ N₂ P M₁ R₂ G₂ S
Suddha Velāvali	S R₂ M₁ P N₂ Ṡ	Ṡ N₂ D₂ N₂ P M₁ G₂ R₂ S
Sugunabhooshani	S G₂ M₁ P M₁ D₂ N₂ Ṡ	Ṡ N₂ D₂ P M₁ D₂ M₁ R₂ S
Swarabhooshani	S G₂ M₁ P D₂ N₂ Ṡ	Ṡ N₂ D₂ P M₁ R₂ S
Swarakalānidhi	S M₁ G₂ M₁ P D₂ N₂ Ṡ	Ṡ N₂ D₂ N₂ P M₁ G₂ R₂ S
Swararanjani	S R₂ G₂ M₁ D₂ N₂ Ṡ	Ṡ N₂ P M₁ G₂ M₁ R₂ S
Tavamukhāri	S R₂ G₂ P D₂ Ṡ	Ṡ N₂ D₂ P M₁ G₂ R₂ S
Vajrakānti	S G₂ M₁ P N₂ Ṡ	Ṡ N₂ D₁ P M₁ G₂ R₂ S
**23 Gourimanohari**	S R₂ G₂ M₁ P D₂ N₃ Ṡ	Ṡ N₃ D₂ P M₁ G₂ R₂ S
**Gowrivelāvali**	S R₂ G₂ S R₂ M₁ P D₂ S S R₂ G₁ G₂ S R₂ M₁ M₁ P D₂ D₂ Ṡ	Ṡ N₃ D₂ P M₁ G₂ R₂ S S N₃ D₂ P M₁ G₁ G₂ R₂ S
Gowrishankar	S R₂ G₂ M₁ P N₃ Ṡ	Ṡ N₃ D₂ P M₁ G₂ R₂ S
Hamsadeepika	S R₂ G₂ M₁ D₂ Ṡ	Ṡ N₃ D₂ P M₁ G₂ R₂ S
Hrudkamali	S R₂ M₁ D₂ N₃ Ṡ	Ṡ N₃ D₂ M₁ R₂ S
Lavanthika	S R₂ M₁ P N₃ Ṡ	Ṡ N₃ P M₁ R₂ S
Sundaramanohari	S R₂ M₁ P N₃ Ṡ	Ṡ N₃ D₂ P M₁ G₂ R₂ S
Patdīp {Hindustani}	N₃ S G₂ M₁ P N₃ Ṡ	Ṡ N₃ D₂ P M₁ P G₂ M₁ G₂ R₂ S
Thyagaraja Mangalam	S G₂ M₁ P N₃ Ṡ	Ṡ N₃ D₂ P M₁ G₂ R₂ S
Vasantashree (Amba Manohari)	S R₂ G₂ M₁ D₂ N₃ Ṡ	Ṡ N₃ D₂ M₁ G₂ R₂ S
Velāvali	S G₂ M₁ D₂ N₃ S S R₂ M₁ P D₂ S S R₂ G₂ M₁ P D₂ S S G₂ R₂ M₁ P D₂ S S R₂ G₂ S R₂ M₁ P D₂ S S R₂ M₁ P D₂ N₃ S	S N₃ D₂ P M₁ G₂ R₂ S S N₃ D₂ P M₁ G₂ R₂ S S N₃ D₂ P M₁ G₂ S S N₃ D₂ P M₁ G₂ R₂ S S N₃ D₂ P M₁ G₂ R₂ S S N₃ D₂ P M₁ G₂ R₂ S
**24 Varuṇapriyā**	S R₂ G₂ M₁ P D₃ N₃ Ṡ	Ṡ N₃ D₃ P M₁ G₂ R₂ S
**Veeravasantham**	S R₂ G₂ M₁ P Ṡ	Ṡ N₃ D₃ P M₁ G₂ R₂ S
**25 Māraranjani**	S R₂ G₃ M₁ P D₁ N₁ Ṡ	Ṡ N₁ D₁ P M₁ G₃ R₂ S
**Sharāvathi**	S R₂ G₃ M₁ P D₁ N₁ D₁ Ṡ	Ṡ N₁ D₁ P M₁ G₃ R₂ S
Devasalaga	S G₃ P D₁ N₁ Ṡ	Ṡ N₁ D₁ P M₁ G₃ R₂ S
Kesari	S R₂ G₃ M₁ P M₁ D₁ P D₁ Ṡ	Ṡ D₁ N₁ D₁ P M₁ G₂ R₂ S
Gayakamandini	S R₂ G₃ M₁ P D₁ S	S D₁ P M₁ G₃ R₂ S
Rājathilaka	S R₂ G₃ M₁ P Ṡ	Ṡ P M₁ G₃ R₂ S
**26 Chārukesi**	S R₂ G₃ M₁ P D₁ N₂ Ṡ	Ṡ N₂ D₁ P M₁ G₃ R₂ S
**Tarangini**	S R₂ G₃ P D₁ N₂ D₁ S S R₂ G₃ P D₁ N₂ D₁ P D₁ S	S D₁ P M₁ G₃ R₂ S S D₁ P G₃ R₂ S G₃ M₁ R₂ G₃ S
Chirswaroopi	S R₂ G₃ M₁ P D₁ N₂ Ṡ	Ṡ N₂ D₁ P M₁ G₃ R₂ S
Māravi	S G₃ M₁ P N₂ Ṡ	Ṡ N₂ D₁ P M₁ G₃ R₂ S
Poorvadhanyāsi	S M₁ G₃ M₁ N₂ Ṡ	Ṡ N₂ D₁ P M₁ G₃ R₂ S
Shiva Manohari	S M₁ G₃ M₁ P D₁ N₂ Ṡ	Ṡ N₂ D₁ P M₁ G₃ R₂ S
Shukrajyothi	S R₂ G₃ M₁ P D₁ N₂ Ṡ	Ṡ N₂ P D₁ M₁ G₃ R₂ S
Ushābharanam	S G₃ M₁ D₁ P M₁ D₁ N₂ Ṡ	Ṡ N₂ D₁ P M₁ G₃ R₂ G₃ M₁ R₂ S
**27 Sarasāngi**	S R₂ G₃ M₁ P D₁ N₃ Ṡ	Ṡ N₃ D₁ P M₁ G₃ R₂ S
**Sowrasenā**	S R₂ M₁ P D₁ Ṡ	Ṡ N₃ D₁ P M₁ G₃ R₂ S
Haripriya	S R₁ G₃ M₁ P Ṡ	Ṡ N₃ D₁ P M₁ G₃ S
Srirangapriya	S R₂ G₃ M₁ P D₁ Ṡ	Ṡ D₁ P M₁ G₃ R₂ S
Kamalā Manohari	S G₃ M₁ P N₃ Ṡ	Ṡ N₃ D₁ P M₁ G₃ S
Madhulika	S R₂ G₃ M₁ N₃ Ṡ	Ṡ N₃ M₁ G₃ R₂ S
Nalinakānthi	S G₃ R₂ M₁ P N₃ Ṡ	Ṡ N₃ P M₁ G₃ R₂ S
Neelamani	S R₂ M₁ P D₁ N₃ Ṡ	Ṡ N₃ D₁ P M₁ R₂ S
Salavi	S G₃ R₂ G₃ M₁ P D₁ N₃ D₁ Ṡ	Ṡ N₃ D₁ P M₁ G₃ R₂ S
Sarasānana	S R₂ G₃ M₁ D₁ N₃ Ṡ	Ṡ N₃ D₁ M₁ G₃ R₂ S
Saraseeruha	S R₂ G₃ M₁ D₁ N₁ D₁ Ṡ	Ṡ N₁ D₁ M₁ G₃ R₂
Simhavāhini	S G₂ M₁ P D₁ N₃ Ṡ	Ṡ N₃ D₁ P M₁ G₃ R₂ S
Surasena	S R₂ M₁ P D₁ Ṡ	Ṡ N₃ D₁ P M₁ G₃ S R₂ S
Sutradhāri	S R₂ M₁ P D₁ Ṡ	Ṡ D₁ P M₁ R₂ S
Vasanthi	S R₂ G₃ P D₁ Ṡ	Ṡ D₁ P G₃ R₂ S
**28 Harikāmbhōji**	S R₂ G₃ M₁ P D₂ N₂ Ṡ	Ṡ N₂ D₂ P M₁ G₃ R₂ S
**Harikedāragowla**	S R₂ G₃ M₁ P D₂ N₂ Ṡ	Ṡ N₂ D₂ P M₁ G₃ R₂ S
Ambhojini	S R₂ G₃ M₁ D₂ Ṡ	Ṡ D₂ M₁ G₃ R₂ S
Andhali	S R₂ M₁ P N₂ Ṡ	Ṡ N₂ P M₁ R₂ G₃ M₁ R₂ S
Aparoopam	S R₂ G₃ M₁ P N₂ D₂ N₂ Ṡ	Ṡ D₂ M₁ G₃ R₂ G₃ S
Bālahamsa	S R₂ M₁ P D₂ Ṡ	Ṡ N₂ D₂ P M₁ R₂ M₁ G₃ S
Bahudāri	S G₃ M₁ P D₂ N₂ Ṡ	Ṡ N₂ P M₁ G₃ S
Chāyalagakhamās	S M₁ G₃ M₁ P D₂ N₂ Ṡ	Ṡ N₂ D₂ P M₁ G₃ R₂ S
Chāyatārangini	S R₂ M₁ G₃ M₁ P N₂ Ṡ	Ṡ N₂ D₂ P M₁ G₃ R₂ S
Chandrahasitham	S R₂ G₃ M₁ D₂ N₂ Ṡ	Ṡ N₂ D₂ M₁ G₃ R₂ S
Dasharatipriya	S M₁ G₃ M₁ P D₂ N₂ D₂ Ṡ	Ṡ N₂ D₂ P M₁ G₃ M₁ R₂ S
Dayaranjani	S R₂ M₁ P D₂ Ṡ	Ṡ N₂ D₂ M₁ G₃ S
Desh {Hindustani}	S R₂ M₁ P N₃ Ṡ	Ṡ N₂ D₂ P M₁ G₃ R₂ S (Anya swara* : N₃)
Deshākshi	S R₂ G₃ P D₂ Ṡ	Ṡ N₂ D₂ P M₁ G₃ R₂ S
Deshkār {Hindustani}	S R₂ G₃ P D₂ Ṡ	Ṡ D₂ P G₃ R₂ S
Dwaithachintāmani	S G₃ M₁ D₂ N₂ S S G₃ M₁ D₂ N₂ S	S N₂ D₂ M₁ P G₃ R₂ S S N₂ D₂ M₁ G₃ R₂ S
Dwijāvanthi /Jujāvanthi	S R₂ M₁ G₃ M₁ P D₂ Ṡ	Ṡ N₂ D₂ P M₁ G₃ M₁ R₂ G₂ R₂ S N₂ D₂ N₂ S (Anya swara* : G₂ N₃)
Eeshamanohari	S R₂ G₃ M₁ P D₂ N₂ Ṡ	Ṡ N₂ D₂ P M₁ R₂ M₁ G₃ R₂ S
Eeshaivaridhi	S R₂ M₁ D₂ N₂ Ṡ	Ṡ N₂ P M₁ R₂ S
Gāndhāralola	S R₂ M₁ P D₂ Ṡ	Ṡ N₂ D₂ P M₁ G₃ M₁ G₃ R₂ S
Gāra {Hindustani}	S G₃ M₁ P D₂ N₃ Ṡ	Ṡ N₂ D₂ P M₁ G₃ R₂ G₂ R₂ S N₃ S N₂ D₂ S (Anya swara* : G₂ D₁ N₃)
Gavati {Hindustani}	S M₁ P N₂ Ṡ	Ṡ D₂ M₁ P G₃ M₁ R₂ N₂ S
Guhamanohari	S R₂ M₁ D₂ N₂ Ṡ	Ṡ N₂ D₂ M₁ R₂ S
Guharanjani	S R₂ S M₁ P D₂ N₂ Ṡ	Ṡ N₂ D₂ N₂ P M₁ G₃ S
Hamsaroopini	S R₂ G₃ P D₂ Ṡ	Ṡ N₂ P M₁ R₂ S
Haridasapriya	S P M₁ G₃ M₁ P N₂ Ṡ	Ṡ N₂ D₂ N₂ P M₁ G₂ R₂ S
Harikedāram	S R₂ G₃ M₁ P D₂ N₂ S N₂ Ṡ	Ṡ N₂ S D₂ N₂ D₂ P M₁ G₃ R₂ S
Harini	S G₃ M₁ P D₂ N₂ D₂ Ṡ	Ṡ N₂ S N₂ D₂ P M₁ G₃ M₁ G₂ R₂ S
Harithapriya	S R₂ M₁ P D₂ Ṡ	Ṡ N₂ D₂ P M₁ G₃ R₂ G₃ R₂ S
Hemasāranga	S R₂ G₃ M₁ P D₂ N₂ D₂ Ṡ	Ṡ P M₁ G₃ R₂ S
Jaijaiwanti {Hindustani}	S D₂ N₂ R₂ S R₂ G₃ M₁ P M₁ G₃ M₁ G₃ R₂ M₁ P N₃ Ṡ	Ṡ N₂ D₂ P D₂ M₁ G₃ M₁ R₂ G₂ R₂ S N₃ S (Anya swara* : G₂ N₃)
Jaithshree	S R₂ G₃ P D₂ Ṡ	Ṡ D₂ P G₃ R₂ S
Jana Sammodhini	S R₂ G₃ P D₂ N₂ Ṡ	Ṡ N₂ D₂ P G₃ R₂ S
Jayarāma	S R₂ G₃ M₁ P D₂ N₂ Ṡ	Ṡ N₂ D₂ P M₁ G₃ S
Jhinjoti {Hindustani}	D₂ S R₂ G₃ M₁ P D₂ N₂	D₂ P M₁ G₃ R₂ S N₂ D₂ P D₂ S
Jujahuli	S M₁ G₃ M₁ P D₂ N₂ Ṡ	Ṡ N₂ D₂ P M₁ G₃ S
Kāmbhoji	S R₂ G₃ M₁ P D₂ Ṡ	S N₂ D₂ P M₁ G₃ R₂ S N₃ P D₂ Ṡ (Anya swara* : N₃)
Kāpi Nārāyani	S R₂ M₁ P D₂ N₂ Ṡ	Ṡ N₂ D₂ P M₁ G₃ R₂ S
Khamāj {Hindustani}	S G₃ M₁ P D₂ N₃ Ṡ	Ṡ N₂ D₂ P M₁ G₃ R₂ S (Anya swara* : N₃)
Kamās	S M₁ G₃ M₁ P D₂ N₂ Ṡ	Ṡ N₂ D₂ P M₁ G₃ R₂ S (Anya swara* : N₃)
Karnātaka Behāg	S R₂ G₃ M₁ P D₂ N₂ Ṡ	Ṡ N₂ D₂ N₂ P D₂ M₁ G₃ R₂ S
Karnātaka Devagāndhāri	S G₃ M₁ P N₂ Ṡ	Ṡ N₂ D₂ P M₁ G₃ R₂ S
Karnātaka Khamās	S G₃ M₁ P D₂ N₂ Ṡ	Ṡ N₂ D₂ P M₁ G₃ S
Kedāragowla	S R₂ M₁ P N₂ Ṡ	Ṡ N₂ D₂ P M₁ G₃ R₂ S
Keshavapriyā	S R₂ S M₁ P D₂ N₂ Ṡ	Ṡ N₂ S P M₁ G₃ R₂ S
Kokiladhwani	S R₂ G₃ M₁ D₂ N₂ D₂ Ṡ	Ṡ N₂ D₂ N₂ P M₁ G₃ R₂ S
Kokilavarāli	S R₂ M₁ P D₂ Ṡ	Ṡ N₂ D₂ M₁ P M₁ G₃ R₂ G₃ S
Kunthalavarāli	S M₁ P D₂ N₂ D₂ Ṡ	Ṡ N₂ D₂ P M₁ S
Mālavi	S R₂ G₃ M₁ P N₂ M₁ D₂ N₂ Ṡ	Ṡ N₂ D₂ N₂ P M₁ G₃ M₁ R₂ S
Madhurakokila	S R₂ G₃ D₂ N₂ Ṡ	Ṡ N₂ D₂ G₃ R₂ S
Mahathi	S G₃ P N₂ Ṡ	Ṡ N₂ P G₃ S
Mahuri	S R₂ M₁ G₃ R₂ G₃ P D₂ Ṡ	Ṡ N₂ D₂ P M₁ G₃ R₂ S R₂ G₃ R₂ S
Manjupriya	S G₃ M₁ P N₂ Ṡ	Ṡ N₂ D₂ P G₃ R₂ S
Manoharam	S R₂ G₃ M₁ D₂ N₂ Ṡ	Ṡ N₂ P M₁ R₂ S
Mattakokila	S R₂ P D₂ N₂ D₂ Ṡ	Ṡ D₂ N₂ D₂ P R₂ S
Meghana	S M₁ G₃ M₁ P D₂ Ṡ	Ṡ N₂ D₂ M₁ G₃ S
Mohanam	S R₂ G₃ P D₂ Ṡ	Ṡ D₂ P G₃ R₂ S
Nādavalli	S R₂ M₁ D₂ N₂ Ṡ	Ṡ N₂ D₂ M₁ R₂ S
Nāgaswarāvali	S G₃ M₁ P D₂ Ṡ	Ṡ D₂ P M₁ G₃ S
Nārāyanagowla	S R₂ M₁ P N₂ D₂ N₂ Ṡ	Ṡ N₂ D₂ P M₁ G₃ R₂ G₃ S
Nārāyani	S R₂ M₁ P D₂ Ṡ	Ṡ N₂ D₂ P M₁ R₂ S
Nāttai Kurinji	S R₂ G₃ M₁ N₂ D₂ N₂ P D₂ N₂ S S R₂ G₃ M₁ D₂ N₂ S S R₂ G₃ M₁ N₂ D₂ N₂ P D₂ N₂ Ṡ	Ṡ N₂ D₂ M₁ G₃ M₁ P G₃ R₂ S S N₂ D₂ M₁ G₃ S S N₂ D₂ M₁ G₃ M₁ P M₁ G₃ R₂ S
Nāttai Nārāyani	S R₂ G₃ M₁ D₂ N₂ D₂ Ṡ	Ṡ N₂ D₂ P M₁ G₃ M₁ R₂ S
Nandhkowns {Hindustani}	S G₃ M₁ P M₁ D₂ N₂ Ṡ	Ṡ N₂ D₂ P M₁ G₃ S G₃ S
Narani	S R₂ M₁ P D₂ Ṡ	Ṡ N₂ D₂ P M₁ R₂ S
Navarasa Kalānidhi	S R₂ M₁ P S N₂ Ṡ	Ṡ N₂ D₂ P M₁ G₃ R₂ S
Navarasa kannada	S G₃ M₁ P Ṡ	Ṡ N₂ D₂ M₁ G₃ R₂ S
Neela	S G₃ M₁ D₂ N₂ Ṡ	Ṡ N₂ D₂ M₁ G₃ S
Pārsi	S R₂ G₃ M₁ D₂ N₂ Ṡ	Ṡ N₂ D₂ P M₁ G₃ R₂ S
Parameshwarapriyā	S R₂ G₃ M₁ P N₂ Ṡ	Ṡ N₂ P M₁ R₂ S
Pashupathipriyā	S R₂ M₁ P M₁ D₂ Ṡ	Ṡ D₂ M₁ P R₂ M₁ S
Poornakāmbhoji	S R₂ G₃ M₁ P N₂ Ṡ	Ṡ D₂ P M₁ G₃ R₂ S
Pratāpa Nāttai	S R₂ G₃ M₁ D₂ P D₂ N₃ Ṡ	Ṡ N₃ D₂ P M₁ G₃ S
Pratāpavarāli	S R₂ M₁ P D₂ P Ṡ	Ṡ D₂ P M₁ G₃ R₂ S
Pravalajyoti	S R₂ M₁ P D₂ N₂ Ṡ	Ṡ N₂ D₂ P M₁ G₃ S
Rāgapanjaramu	S R₂ M₁ P D₂ N₂ D₂ Ṡ	Ṡ N₂ D₂ M₁ R₂ S
Rāgavinodini	S R₂ G₃ M₁ D₂ Ṡ	Ṡ D₂ M₁ G₃ R₂ S
Rāgeshree	S G₃ M₁ D₂ N₂ S S G₃ M₁ D₂ N₂ S S G₃ M₁ D₂ N₂ Ṡ	Ṡ N₂ D₂ M₁ G₃ R₂ S S N₂ D₂ M₁ G₃ R₂ S S N₂ D₂ N₃ D₂ M₁ G₃ R₂ S (Anya swara*{rarely} : N₃)
Ravi Chandrikā	S R₂ G₃ M₁ D₂ Ṡ	Ṡ N₂ D₂ M₁ G₃ R₂ S
Sāvithri	S G₃ M₁ P N₂ Ṡ	Ṡ N₂ P M₁ G₃ S
Sahāna	S R₂ G₃ M₁ P M₁ D₂ N₂ Ṡ	Ṡ N₂ S D₂ N₂ D₂ P M₁ G₃ M₁ R₂ G₃ R₂ S
Saraswathi Manohari	S R₂ G₃ M₁ D₂ Ṡ	Ṡ D₂ N₂ P M₁ G₃ R₂ S
Sathvamanjari	S R₂ M₁ P D₂ Ṡ	Ṡ N₂ D₂ P M₁ N₂ D₂ M₁ R₂ S
Shakunthala	S R₂ G₃ M₁ D₂ N₂ Ṡ	Ṡ N₂ D₂ M₁ G₃ S
Shankaraharigowla	S R₂ G₃ M₁ P D₂ N₃ Ṡ	Ṡ N₂ D₂ P M₁ G₃ R₂ S
Shenchukāmbhoji	S P M₁ D₂ N₂ Ṡ	Ṡ N₂ D₂ P M₁ G₃ R₂ S
Chenjurutti	D₂ S R₂ G₃ M₁ P D₂ N₂	N₂ D₂ P M₁ G₃ R₂ S N₂ D₂ P D₂ S (Anya swara* : G₂)
Shiva Kāmbhoji	S R₂ G₃ M₁ N₂ Ṡ	Ṡ N₂ P M₁ G₃ R₂ S
Surutti	S R₂ M₁ P N₂ D₂ N₂ Ṡ	Ṡ N₂ D₂ P M₁ G₃ P M₁ R₂ S
Shyāmā	S R₂ M₁ P D₂ S S R₂ G₃ S R₂ P M₁ D₂ D₂ S	S D₂ P M₁ G₃ R₂ S S D₂ P M₁ G₃ R₂ S
Simhavikrama	S R₂ G₃ R₂ M₁ P D₂ P N₂ Ṡ	Ṡ N₂ D₂ P M₁ G₃ R₂ S
Sindhu Kannada	S M₁ G₃ M₁ R₂ G₃ M₁ P D₂ P Ṡ	Ṡ N₂ D₂ P M₁ G₃ R₂ S
Sindhu Surutti	S R₂ M₁ P N₂ S S N₂ Ṡ	Ṡ N₂ D₂ P M₁ R₂ M₁ G₃ R₂ S
Suddha Khamās	S M₁ G₃ M₁ P D₂ N₂ Ṡ	Ṡ N₂ D₂ P M₁ G₃ R₂ S
Suddha Varāli	S R₂ G₃ M₁ D₂ N₂ Ṡ	Ṡ N₂ D₂ N₂ P M₁ G₃ S
Suddha	S R₂ M₁ P D₂ Ṡ	Ṡ N₂ D₂ P M₁ R₂ S
Suddhatarangini	S R₂ M₁ P D₂ Ṡ	Ṡ N₂ D₂ P M₁ G₃ R₂ S
Sumanapriyā	S R₂ G₃ M₁ P D₂ P Ṡ	Ṡ D₂ S P M₁ G₃ R₂ S
Suposhini	S R₂ S M₁ P N₂ D₂ Ṡ	Ṡ D₂ P M₁ R₂ M₁ S
Suvarnakriyā	S R₂ G₃ P N₂ D₂ Ṡ	Ṡ N₂ P G₃ R₂ S
Swarāvali	S M₁ G₃ M₁ P N₂ D₂ N₂ Ṡ	Ṡ N₂ D₂ P M₁ G₃ R₂ S
Swaravedi	S M₁ G₃ M₁ P N₂ D₂ N₂ Ṡ	Ṡ N₂ D₂ P M₁ G₃ S
Tilakavathi	S R₂ G₃ M₁ P D₂ P Ṡ	Ṡ D₂ P M₁ R₂ S
Tilang {Hindustani}	S G₃ M₁ P N₃ Ṡ	Ṡ N₂ P M₁ G₃ S (Anya swara* : N₃)
Umābharanam	S R₂ G₃ M₁ P D₂ N₂ Ṡ	Ṡ N₂ P M₁ R₂ G₃ M₁ R₂ S
Vaishnavi	S R₂ G₃ M₁ P D₂ Ṡ	Ṡ D₂ P M₁ G₃ R₂ S
Veenavadini	S R₂ G₃ P N₂ Ṡ	Ṡ N₂ P G₃ R₂ S
Vivardhani	S R₂ M₁ P Ṡ	Ṡ N₂ D₂ P M₁ G₃ R₂ S
Yadukula Kāmbhoji	S R₂ M₁ P D₂ Ṡ	Ṡ N₂ D₂ P M₁ G₃ R₂ S
**29 Dhīraśankarābharaṇam**	S R₂ G₃ M₁ P D₂ N₃ Ṡ	Ṡ N₃ D₂ P M₁ G₃ R₂ S
Ānandharoopa	S R₂ G₃ P D₂ N₃ Ṡ	Ṡ N₃ D₂ P G₃ R₂ S
Ārabhi	S R₂ M₁ P D₂ S S R₂ M₁ P D₂ Ṡ	Ṡ N₃ D₂ P M₁ G₃ R₂ S S D₂ P M₁ G₃ R₂ S
Atāna	S R₂ M₁ P N₂ Ṡ	Ṡ N₂ D₂ P M₁ G₂ M₁ R₂ S (Anya swara* : G₂ N₂)
Bangāla	S R₂ G₃ M₁ P M₁ R₂ P Ṡ	Ṡ N₃ P M₁ R₂ G₃ M₁ R₂ S
Begada	S G₃ R₂ G₃ M₁ P D₂ P Ṡ	Ṡ N₃ D₂ P M₁ G₃ R₂ S
Behāg (Carnatic adaptation)	S G₃ M₁ P N₃ D₂ N₃ Ṡ	Ṡ N₃ D₂ P M₁ G₃ R₂ S (Anya swara* : M₂ N₂)
Behāg Deshikam	S R₂ G₃ M₁ M₂ P D₂ N₃ Ṡ	Ṡ N₃ D₂ P M₂ M₁ G₃ R₂ S
Bihag {Original/Hindustani}	N₃ S G₃ M₁ P N₃ Ṡ	Ṡ N₃ D₂ P M₂ P G₃ M₁ G₃ R₂ S (Anya swara* : M₂)
Bilahari	S R₂ G₃ P D₂ Ṡ	Ṡ N₃ D₂ P M₁ G₃ R₂ S (Anya swara* : N₂)
Buddhamanohari	S R₂ G₃ M₁ S P Ṡ	Ṡ P M₁ G₃ R₂ S
Buddharanjani	S R₂ G₃ M₁ P Ṡ	Ṡ N₃ P M₁ G₃ M₁ R₂ S
Chāyā	S P M₁ P D₂ P N₃ R₂ Ṡ	Ṡ D₂ P M₁ P D₂ P G₃ M₁ R₂ S
Chāyashankarābharanam	S R₁ M₁ P D₂ N₃ Ṡ	Ṡ N₃ D₂ P M₁ G₃ R₁ S
Devagāndhāri	S R₂ M₁ P D₂ Ṡ	Ṡ N₃ D₂ P M₁ G₃ R₂ S (Anya swara* : N₂)
Dharmalakhi	S M₁ P D₂ N₃ Ṡ	Ṡ N₃ D₂ P M₁ S
Dhurvanki	S R₂ M₁ P D₂ Ṡ	Ṡ N₃ D₂ P M₁ G₃ R₂ S
Durga {Hindustani}	S R₂ M₁ D₂ P D₂ Ṡ	Ṡ D₂ P M₁ R₂ S
Gajagowri	S R₂ M₁ G₃ M₁ N₃ P D₂ Ṡ	Ṡ N₃ D₂ P M₁ P M₁ G₃ R₂ S
Garudadhvani	S R₂ G₃ M₁ P D₂ N₃ Ṡ	Ṡ D₂ P G₃ R₂ S
Gowdamalhār	S R₂ M₁ P D₂ Ṡ	Ṡ N₃ M₁ G₃ R₂ S
Hamsadhwani	S R₂ G₃ P N₃ Ṡ	Ṡ N₃ P G₃ R₂ S
Hamsavinodhini	S R₂ G₃ M₁ D₂ N₃ Ṡ	Ṡ N₃ D₂ M₁ G₃ R₂ S
Hemant {Hindustani}	N₃ S D₂ N₃ S G₃ G₃ M₁ D₂ N₃ Ṡ	Ṡ N₃ D₂ P M₁ G₃ R₂ S
Jana Ranjani	S R₂ G₃ M₁ P D₂ P N₃ Ṡ	Ṡ D₂ P M₁ R₂ S
Julavu	P D₂ N₃ S R₂ G₃ M₁ P	M₁ G₃ R₂ S N₃ D₂ P M₁
Kamaripriyā	S G₃ M₁ D₂ N₃ Ṡ	Ṡ N₃ D₂ M₁ M₁ G₃ M₁ R₂ S
Kannada	S R₂ G₃ M₁ P M₁ D₂ N₃ Ṡ	Ṡ N₃ S D₂ P M₁ G₃ M₁ G₃ M₁ R₂ S
Kathanakuthuhalam	S R₂ M₁ D₂ N₃ G₃ P Ṡ	Ṡ N₃ D₂ P M₁ G₃ R₂ S
Kaushikadhwani / Bhinna shadaj {Hindustani}	S G₃ M₁ D₂ N₃ Ṡ	Ṡ N₃ D₂ M₁ G₃ S
Kedaram	S M₁ G₃ M₁ P N₃ Ṡ	Ṡ N₃ P M₁ G₃ R₂ S
Kokilabhāshani	S R₂ G₃ M₁ P D₂ N₃ Ṡ	Ṡ N₃ P M₁ G₃ M₁ R₂ S
Kolahalam	S P M₁ G₃ M₁ P D₂ N₃ Ṡ	Ṡ N₃ D₂ P M₁ G₃ R₂ S
Kurinji	S N₃ S R₂ G₃ M₁ P D₂	D₂ P M₁ G₃ R₂ S N₃ S
Kusumavichithra	S G₃ R₂ G₃ M₁ P N₃ P D₂ N₃ Ṡ	Ṡ D₂ N₃ D₂ M₁ G₃ P M₁ G₃ R₂ S
Kutuhala	S R₂ M₁ N₃ D₂ P N₃ Ṡ	Ṡ N₃ D₂ P M₁ G₃ R₂ S
Lahari	S R₂ G₃ P D₂ Ṡ	Ṡ D₂ P M₁ G₃ R₂ S
Mānd {Hindustani}	S G₃ M₁ D₂ N₃ Ṡ	Ṡ N₃ D₂ P M₁ G₃ R₂ S (Anya swara* : R₁ G₂ M₂ D₁ N₂)
Māyadravila	S R₂ G₃ M₁ P D₂ N₃ Ṡ	Ṡ N₂ P M₁ P G₃ M₁ R₂ S
Mohanadhwani	S R₂ G₃ P D₂ Ṡ	Ṡ N₃ P D₂ P G₃ R₂ S
Nāgabhooshani	S R₂ M₁ P D₂ N₃ Ṡ	Ṡ D₂ P M₁ R₂ S
Nāgadhwani	S R₂ S M₁ G₃ M₁ P N₃ D₂ N₃ Ṡ	Ṡ N₃ D₂ N₃ P M₁ G₃ S
Nārāyanadeshākshi	S R₂ M₁ G₃ R₂ G₃ M₁ P D₂ N₃ Ṡ	Ṡ N₃ D₂ P M₁ G₃ R₂ S
Navaroj	P D₂ N₃ S R₂ G₃ M₁ P	M₁ G₁ R₃ S N₂ D₂ P (Anya swara* : N₂)
Neelāmbari	S R₂ G₃ M₁ P D₂ P N₃ Ṡ	Ṡ N₃ P M₁ G₃ R₂ G₃ S (Anya swara* : N₂)
Niroshta	S R₂ G₃ D₂ N₃ Ṡ	Ṡ N₃ D₂ G₃ R₂ S
Pahādi {Hindustani}	S R₂ G₃ P D₂ P D₂ S	N₃ D₂ P G₃ M₁ G₃ R₂ S N₃ D₂ P D₂ S (Anya swara* : R₁ G₂ M₂ D₁ N₂)
Poornachandrika	S R₂ G₃ M₁ P D₂ P Ṡ	Ṡ N₃ P M₁ R₂ G₃ M₁ R₂ S
Poornagowla	S R₂ G₃ M₁ P N₃ D₂ N₃ P D₂ N₃ Ṡ	Ṡ N₃ D₂ N₃ P M₁ G₃ R₂ S
Poorvagowla	S G₃ R₂ G₃ S R₂ M₁ P D₂ N₃ Ṡ	Ṡ N₃ D₂ P M₁ G₃ R₂ S
Rathnabhooshani	S R₂ G₃ M₁ P Ṡ	Ṡ P M₁ G₃ R₂ S
Reetuvilāsa	S G₃ M₁ P D₂ N₃ Ṡ	Ṡ N₃ D₂ P M₁ G₃ S
Sāranga Mallār	S R₂ M₁ P D₂ N₃ Ṡ	Ṡ N₃ D₂ P M₁ R₂ S N₃ S
Shankara	S G₃ P Ṡ	Ṡ N₃ D₂ P G₃ P R₂ G₃ S
Shankara {Hindustani}	S G₃ P N₃ D₂ Ṡ N₃ Ṡ	Ṡ N₃ D₂ P G₃ P G₃ R₂ S
Shankaraharigowla	S R₂ G₃ M₁ P D₂ N₃ Ṡ	Ṡ N₂ D₂ P M₁ G₃ R₂ S
Shankaramohana	S R₂ G₃ P N₃ D₂ S N₃	S D₂ P G₃ R₂ S
Shankari	S G₃ P N₃ Ṡ	Ṡ N₃ P G₃ S
Sindhu	S M₁ P D₂ Ṡ	Ṡ N₃ D₂ M₁ P M₁ G₃ R₂ S
Sindhu Mandāri	S R₂ G₃ M₁ P Ṡ	Ṡ N₃ D₂ P G₃ M₁ P M₁ R₂ S
Suddha Mālavi	S R₂ G₃ M₁ P N₃ Ṡ	Ṡ D₂ N₃ P M₁ G₃ R₂ S
Suddha Sārang	S R₂ G₃ M₁ P D₂ N₃ D₂ Ṡ	Ṡ D₂ P M₁ R₂ G₃ R₂ S
Suddha Sāveri	S R₂ M₁ P D₂ Ṡ	Ṡ D₂ P M₁ R₂ S
Suddha Vasantha	S R₂ G₃ M₁ P N₃ Ṡ	Ṡ N₃ D₂ N₃ P M₁ G₃ S
Suranandini	S R₂ G₃ P D₂ N₃ Ṡ	Ṡ N₃ D₂ P G₃ R₂ S
Suraranjani	S G₃ P R₂ M₁ D₂ Ṡ	Ṡ N₃ D₂ P M₁ G₃ R₂ S
Tāndavam	S G₃ P D₂ N₃ Ṡ	Ṡ N₃ D₂ P G₃ S
Vallabhi	S R₂ G₃ M₁ P D₂ N₃ Ṡ	Ṡ N₃ D₂ N₃ D₂ P M₁ P G₃ M₁ R₂ S
Vasanthamalai	S R₂ M₁ P N₃ Ṡ	Ṡ D₂ P M₁ R₂ S
Vedhāndhagamana	S G₃ M₁ P N₃ Ṡ	Ṡ N₃ P M₁ G₃ S
Veerapratāpa	S G₃ M₁ P D₂ Ṡ	Ṡ N₃ D₂ P M₁ G₃ R₂ S
Vilāsini	S R₂ G₃ M₁ P N₃ Ṡ	Ṡ N₃ P M₁ G₃ R₂ S
**30 Nāganandini**	S R₂ G₃ M₁ P D₃ N₃ Ṡ	Ṡ N₃ D₃ P M₁ G₃ R₂ S
**Nāgabharanam**	S R₂ G₂ M₁ P D₃ N₃ Ṡ	Ṡ N₃ D₃ P M₁ G₂ R₂ S
Gambheeravani	S G₃ P M₁ D₃ N₃ Ṡ	Ṡ N₃ P M₁ G₃ R₂ G₃ R₂ S
Lalithagāndharva	S R₂ G₃ M₁ P D₃ N₃ Ṡ	Ṡ N₃ P G₃ R₂ S
Sāmanta	S R₂ G₃ M₁ P D₃ N₃ Ṡ	Ṡ N₃ D₃ N₃ D₃ P M₁ G₃ R₂ S
**31 Yāgapriyā**	S R₃ G₃ M₁ P D₁ N₁ Ṡ	Ṡ N₁ D₁ P M₁ G₃ R₃ S
**Kalāvathi**	S R₃ G₃ M₁ P D₁ N₁ Ṡ	Ṡ N₁ D₁ P M₁ G₃ R₃ S
Damarugapriya	S R₃ G₃ P D₁ N₁ Ṡ	Ṡ N₁ D₁ P G₃ R₃ S
Desharanjani	S R₃ M₁ P D₁ N₁ Ṡ	Ṡ N₁ D₁ P M₁ R₃ S
Deshyathodi	S G₂ M₁ P D₁ N₂ Ṡ	Ṡ N₂ D₁ P M₁ G₂ R₁ S
Kalāhamsa	S R₃ G₃ M₁ P D₁ Ṡ	Ṡ N₁ D₁ P M₁ G₃ R₃ S
Niranjani	S R₃ M₁ D₁ N₁ Ṡ	Ṡ N₁ D₁ M₁ R₃ S
Prathāpahamsi	S G₃ M₁ P N₁ D₁ N₁ Ṡ	Ṡ N₁ D₁ P M₁ G₃ M₁ R₃ S
**32 Rāgavardhini**	S R₃ G₃ M₁ P D₁ N₂ Ṡ	Ṡ N₂ D₁ P M₁ G₃ R₃ S
**Rāgachoodāmani**	S R₃ G₃ M₁ P N₂ Ṡ	Ṡ N₂ D₁ M₁ R₃ G₃ S
Amudagāndhāri	S G₃ M₁ P D₁ N₂ Ṡ	Ṡ N₂ D₁ P M₁ G₃ R₃ S
Dhowmya	S R₃ G₃ M₁ P D₁ N₂ P Ṡ	Ṡ N₂ D₁ P M₁ G₃ R₃ S
Hindoladarbār	S G₃ M₁ P Ṡ	Ṡ N₂ D₁ P M₁ R₃ S
Ramyā	S R₃ G₃ M₁ P D₁ N₂ P Ṡ	Ṡ N₂ D₁ P M₁ G₃ R₃ S
Sāmantajingala	S R₃ G₃ M₁ P D₁ N₂ Ṡ	Ṡ N₂ P D₁ N₂ P M₁ G₃ M₁ R₃ G₃ S
**33 Gāngeyabhuśani**	S R₃ G₃ M₁ P D₁ N₃ Ṡ	Ṡ N₃ D₁ P M₁ G₃ R₃ S
**Gangātarangini**	S R₃ G₃ M₁ P D₁ N₃ Ṡ	Ṡ N₃ D₁ P M₁ M₁ G₃ M₁ R₃ S
**34 Vāgadhīśvari**	S R₃ G₃ M₁ P D₂ N₂ Ṡ	Ṡ N₂ D₂ P M₁ G₃ R₃ S
**Amarasindhu**	S R₃ G₃ P D₂ N₂ Ṡ	Ṡ N₂ D₂ P G₃ R₃ S
**Bhogachāyā Nāttai**	S R₃ G₃ R₃ G₃ M₁ P N₂ N₂ Ṡ	Ṡ N₂ D₂ N₂ P S N₂ P M₁ M₁ R₃ S
Bhānumanjari	S R₃ G₃ M₁ P N₂ Ṡ	Ṡ N₂ P M₁ R₃ G₃ R₃ S
Chāyanāttai	S R₃ G₃ M₁ P M₁ P Ṡ	Ṡ N₂ D₂ N₂ P M₁ R₃ S
Maghathi	S R₃ M₁ P D₂ N₂ Ṡ	Ṡ N₂ D₂ P M₁ R₃ S
Drāvida Kalāvati	S R₃ G₃ P D₂ Ṡ	Ṡ N₂ D₂ P G₃ R₃ S
Mohanāngi	S R₃ G₃ P D₂ Ṡ	Ṡ D₂ P G₃ P D₂ P G₃ R₃ S
Murali	S R₃ G₃ M₁ D₂ N₂ Ṡ	Ṡ N₂ D₂ M₁ G₃ R₃ S
Sharadabharana	S M₁ G₃ M₁ P M₁ D₂ N₂ Ṡ	Ṡ N₂ D₂ M₁ P M₁ R₃ S
Vikhavathi	S R₃ G₃ P D₂ Ṡ	Ṡ D₂ P G₃ R₃ S
**35 Śūlini**	S R₃ G₃ M₁ P D₂ N₃ Ṡ	Ṡ N₃ D₂ P M₁ G₃ R₃ S
**Shailadeshākshhi**	S M₁ G₃ P D₂ Ṡ	Ṡ N₃ D₂ S N₃ P M₁ G₃ S
Suryavasantham	S M₁ G₃ M₁ D₂ N₃ Ṡ	Ṡ N₃ D₂ M₁ G₃ R₃ S
Dheerahindolam	S G₃ M₁ D₂ N₃ Ṡ	Ṡ N₃ D₂ P M₁ G₃ R₃ S
Ganavaridhi	S M₁ R₃ G₃ M₁ P D₂ N₂ Ṡ S M₁ R₃ G₃ M₁ P D₂ N₃ Ṡ	Ṡ D₂ N₂ P M₁ R₃ S Ṡ D₂ N₃ P M₁ R₃ S
Shokavarāli	S G₃ D₂ N₃	D₂ P M₁ G₃ R₃ S
**36 Chalanāṭṭai**	S R₃ G₃ M₁ P D₃ N₃ Ṡ	Ṡ N₃ D₃ P M₁ G₃ R₃ S
Devanāttai	S G₃ M₁ P Ṡ	Ṡ N₃ D₃ P M₁ G₃ R₃ S
Gambheeranāṭṭai	S G₃ M₁ P N₃ Ṡ	Ṡ N₃ P M₁ G₃ S
Ganaranjani	S R₃ G₃ M₁ P M₁ D₃ N₃ Ṡ	Ṡ N₃ D₃ P M₁ P M₁ R₃ S
Nāṭṭai	S R₃ G₃ M₁ P N₃ Ṡ	Ṡ N₃ P M₁ G₃ R₃ S
**37 Sālagam**	S R₁ G₁ M₂ P D₁ N₁ Ṡ	Ṡ N₁ D₁ P M₂ G₁ R₁ S
**Sowgandhini**	S R₁ M₂ P D₁ Ṡ	Ṡ N₁ D₁ P M₂ G₁ R₁ S
Bhogasāveri	S R₁ M₂ D₁ N₁	D₁ P M₂ G₁ R₁ S
**38 Jalārnavam**	S R₁ G₁ M₂ P D₁ N₂ Ṡ	Ṡ N₂ D₁ P M₂ G₁ R₁ S
**Jaganmohinam**	S R₁ G₁ M₂ P D₁ N₂ Ṡ	Ṡ N₂ D₁ P M₂ G₁ R₁ S
Jaganmohana	S R₁ G₁ M₂ P D₂ Ṡ	Ṡ N₂ D₁ P M₂ G₁ R₁ S
**39 Jhālavarāḷi**	S R₁ G₁ M₂ P D₁ N₃ Ṡ	Ṡ N₃ D₁ P M₂ G₁ R₁ S
**Dhālivarāli**	S R₁ G₁ M₂ P D₁ N₃ Ṡ	Ṡ N₃ D₁ P M₂ G₁ R₁ S
Bhoopālapanchamam	S G₁ R₁ G₁ P M₂ D₁ Ṡ	Ṡ P D₁ M₂ G₁ R₁ S
Godari	S R₁ G₁ R₁ M₂ G₁ M₂ P D₁ N₃ Ṡ	Ṡ N₃ D₁ P M₂ R₁ S
Jālasugandhi	S R₁ G₁ M₂ P D₁ Ṡ	Ṡ D₁ P M₂ G₁ R₁ S
Janāvali	S G₂ R₁ G₂ M₂ P D₁ N₃ D₁ Ṡ	Ṡ N₃ D₁ P M₂ G₂ R₁ S
Karunāmritavarshini	S R₁ G₁ M₂ P D₁ N₃ P Ṡ	Ṡ N₃ D₁ M₂ G₁ R₁ S
Kokilapanchamam	S G₁ R₁ G₁ P D₁ N₃ Ṡ	Ṡ N₃ D₁ P M₂ G₁ R₁ S
Varāli	S G₁ R₁ G₁ M₂ P D₁ N₃ Ṡ	Ṡ N₃ D₁ P M₂ G₁ R₁ S
**40 Navanītam**	S R₁ G₁ M₂ P D₂ N₂ Ṡ	Ṡ N₂ D₂ P M₂ G₁ R₁ S
**Nabhomani**	S G₁ R₁ G₁ M₂ P Ṡ	Ṡ N₂ D₂ P M₂ G₁ R₁ S
**41 Pāvani**	S R₁ G₁ M₂ P D₂ N₃ Ṡ	Ṡ N₃ D₂ P M₂ G₁ R₁ S
**Kumbhini**	S G₁ R₁ G₁ M₂ P N₃ D₂ N₃ Ṡ	Ṡ N₃ D₂ P M₂ G₁ R₁ S
Chandrajyothi	S R₁ G₁ M₂ P D₂ Ṡ	Ṡ D₂ P M₂ G₁ R₁ S
Prabhāvali	S R₁ M₂ P D₂ N₃ Ṡ	Ṡ N₃ D₂ M₂ P M₂ R₁ G₁ R₁ S
Poornalalitha	S R₁ M₂ G₁ R₁ M₂ P N₃ D₂ N₃ Ṡ	Ṡ N₃ D₂ P M₂ G₁ R₁ S
**42 Raghupriyā**	S R₁ G₁ M₂ P D₃ N₃ Ṡ	Ṡ N₃ D₃ P M₂ G₁ R₁ S
**Ravi Kriyā**	S G₁ R₁ G₁ M₂ P D₃ N₃ Ṡ	Ṡ N₃ P M₂ G₁ R₁ S
Gāndharva	M₂ P D₃ N₃ S R₁ G₁	R₁ S N₃ P M₂ P
Gomathi	S R₁ G₁ M₂ P D₃ N₃	P M₂ G₁ R₁ S
Raghuleela	S M₂ R₁ P M₂ G₁ M₂ P M₂ R₁ M₂ P N₃ Ṡ	Ṡ N₃ D₃ N₃ P M₂ G₁ M₂ R₁ M₂ G₁ R₁ S
**43 Ghavāmbhodi**	S R₁ G₂ M₂ P D₁ N₁ Ṡ	Ṡ N₁ D₁ P M₂ G₂ R₁ S
**Geervāni**	S R₁ G₂ M₂ P D₁ N₁ Ṡ	Ṡ N₁ D₁ P M₂ G₂ R₁ S
Kanchanabowli	S G₂ M₂ P D₁ Ṡ	Ṡ N₁ D₁ P M₁ G₂ R₁ S
Mahathi	S G₂ M₂ P D₁ N₁ Ṡ	Ṡ N₁ D₁ P M₂ G₂ S
Mechagāndhāri	S R₃ G₃ M₁ P D₂ N₂ Ṡ	Ṡ N₂ D₂ N₂ P M₁ G₃ M₁ R₃ S
Suvarnadeepakam	S R₁ G₂ M₂ P D₁ Ṡ	Ṡ D₁ P M₂ G₂ R₁ S
Vijayabhooshāvali	S R₁ G₃ M₂ P Ṡ	Ṡ N₃ D₃ P M₂ G₃ R₁ S
**44 Bhavapriyā**	S R₁ G₂ M₂ P D₁ N₂ Ṡ	Ṡ N₂ D₁ P M₂ G₂ R₁ S
**Bhavāni**	S R₁ G₂ M₂ D₁ N₂ S	S N₂ D₁ M₂ G₂ R₁ S
**Bhavāni**	S R₁ G₂ M₂ P D₁ P N₂ Ṡ	Ṡ N₂ D₁ P M₂ G₂ R₁ S
Kanchanāvathi	S R₁ G₂ M₂ P N₂ Ṡ	Ṡ N₂ P M₂ G₂ R₁ S
**45 Śubhapantuvarāḷi**	S R₁ G₂ M₂ P D₁ N₃ Ṡ	Ṡ N₃ D₁ P M₂ G₂ R₁ S
**Shivapanthuvarāli**	S R₁ G₂ M₂ P D₁ N₃ Ṡ	Ṡ N₃ D₁ P M₂ G₂ R₁ S
Arunāngi	S R₁ M₂ P N₃ D₁ Ṡ	Ṡ N₃ D₁ M₂ R₁ G₂ R₁ S
Bandhuvarāli	S M₂ S N₃ D₁ P M₂	D₁ M₂ G₂ R₁ S
Bhānudhanyāsi	S R₁ G₂ M₂ N₃ D₁ N₃	D₁ P M₂ G₂ R₁ S N₃ S
Bhānukeeravāni	S R₁ G₂ M₂ P D₁ N₃ Ṡ	Ṡ N₃ D₁ M₂ G₂ R₁ S
Chāyaranjani	S G₂ M₂ P N₃ Ṡ	Ṡ N₃ D₁ P M₂ G₂ S
Dhowreyani	S R₁ G₂ M₂ N₃ Ṡ	Ṡ N₃ D₁ P M₂ G₂ R₁ S
Hindusthāni Todi	N₃ R₁ G₂ M₂ D₁ N₃ Ṡ	Ṡ N₃ D₁ P M₂ G₂ R₁ S
Jālakesari	S R₁ M₂ P D₁ N₃ Ṡ	Ṡ D₁ P M₂ R₁ S
Kumudhachandrikā	S G₂ M₂ D₁ Ṡ	Ṡ N₃ D₁ M₂ G₂ R₁ S
Mahānandhini	S M₂ G₂ M₂ P D₁ N₃ Ṡ	Ṡ D₁ N₃ D₁ P M₂ G₂ R₁ S
Multani {Hindustani}	S G₂ M₂ P N₃ Ṡ	Ṡ N₃ D₁ P M₂ G₂ R₁ S
Parpathi	S G₂ M₂ P N₃ Ṡ	Ṡ N₃ P M₂ G₂ S
Shekharachandrikā	S R₁ G₂ M₂ D₁ N₃ Ṡ	Ṡ N₃ D₁ M₂ G₂ R₁ S
**46 Śadvidamārgini**	S R₁ G₂ M₂ P D₂ N₂ Ṡ	Ṡ N₂ D₂ P M₂ G₂ R₁ S
**Sthavarājam**	S R₁ M₂ P D₂ Ṡ	Ṡ N₂ D₂ M₂ G₂ S
Ganahemāvati	S G₂ M₂ P N₂ Ṡ	Ṡ N₂ D₂ P M₂ G₂ S
Indhudhanyāsi	S G₂ M₂ D₂ N₂ Ṡ	Ṡ N₂ D₂ P D₂ M₂ G₂ R₁ S
Shreekānti	S G₂ M₂ P D₂ N₂ Ṡ	Ṡ N₂ D₂ P M₂ G₂ S
Teevravāhini	S R₁ G₂ M₂ P D₂ P N₂ Ṡ	Ṡ N₂ D₂ P M₂ G₂ R₁ G₂ M₂ R₁ S
Vaishalini	R₁ G₂ M₂ D₂ N₂	N₂ D₂ M₂ G₂ R₁
**47 Suvarnāngi**	S R₁ G₂ M₂ P D₂ N₃ Ṡ	Ṡ N₃ D₂ P M₂ G₂ R₁ S
**Sowveeram**	S R₁ G₂ M₂ P D₂ N₃ Ṡ	Ṡ N₃ D₂ P M₂ G₂ R₁ S
Abhiru	S R₁ G₂ R₁ M₂ P N₃ Ṡ	Ṡ D₂ P M₂ G₂ R₁ G₂ S
Rathikā	S M₂ G₂ M₂ P D₂ N₃ Ṡ	Ṡ N₃ D₂ P M₂ G₂ R₁ S
Vijayashree	S R₁ G₂ M₂ P N₂ Ṡ	Ṡ N₂ P M₂ G₂ R₁ S
**48 Divyamaṇi**	S R₁ G₂ M₂ P D₃ N₃ Ṡ	Ṡ N₃ D₃ P M₂ G₂ R₁ S
**Jeevanthikā**	S M₂ P D₃ N₃ Ṡ	Ṡ N₃ P M₂ G₂ S
Deshamukhāri	S R₁ G₂ M₂ P D₃ N₃ D₃ Ṡ	Ṡ D₃ N₃ D₃ P M₂ G₂ R₁ S
Dundubi	S R₁ G₂ M₂ P D₃ N₃ Ṡ	Ṡ N₃ P M₂ G₂ R₁ S
Jeevanthini	S M₂ P D₃ N₃ Ṡ	Ṡ N₃ P M₂ G₂ S
Suddha Gāndhāri	S R₁ G₂ M₂ N₃ Ṡ	Ṡ N₃ D₃ N₃ S N₃ P M₂ R₁ S
**49 Dhavaḻāmbari**	S R₁ G₃ M₂ P D₁ N₁ Ṡ	Ṡ N₁ D₁ P M₂ G₃ R₁ S
**Dhavalāngam**	S R₁ G₃ M₂ P D₁ Ṡ	Ṡ N₁ D₁ P M₂ G₃ R₁ S
Abhirāmam	S R₁ M₂ P D₁ N₁ Ṡ	Ṡ N₁ D₁ P M₂ G₂ R₁ S
Bhinnapauarali	S M₂ P D₁ N₁ D₁ Ṡ	Ṡ N₁ D₁ P M₂ G₃ S
Dharmini	S R₁ G₃ M₂ D₁ N₁ Ṡ	Ṡ N₁ D₁ M₂ G₃ R₁ S
Sudharmini	S R₁ M₂ P D₁ N₁ Ṡ	Ṡ N₁ D₁ M₁ G₃ R₂ S
**50 Nāmanārāyaṇi**	S R₁ G₃ M₂ P D₁ N₂ Ṡ	Ṡ N₂ D₁ P M₂ G₃ R₁ S
**Nāmadeshi**	S R₁ G₃ M₂ P D₁ N₂ Ṡ	Ṡ N₂ D₁ P M₂ G₃ R₁ S
Narmada	S R₁ G₃ M₂ D₁ N₂ Ṡ	Ṡ N₂ D₁ M₂ P M₂ G₃ R₁ S
Neelanjana (Raga created by Mahesh Mahadev)	S R₁ G₃ P N₂ Ṡ	Ṡ N₂ P M₂ G₃ R₁ S
Swaramanjari	S G₃ M₂ P D₁ Ṡ	Ṡ N₂ D₁ P M₂ G₃ S
**51 Panthuvarāli (Kāmavardhini)**	S R₁ G₃ M₂ P D₁ N₃ Ṡ	Ṡ N₃ D₁ P M₂ G₃ R₁ S
**Kāshirāmakriyā**	S G₃ R₁ G₃ M₂ P D₁ N₃ Ṡ	Ṡ N₃ D₁ P M₁ G₃ R₁ S
Mandāri	S R₁ G₃ M₂ P N₃ Ṡ	Ṡ N₃ P M₂ G₃ R₁ S
ādhi Panchama	S R₁ P D₁ N₃ Ṡ	Ṡ N₃ D₁ N₃ P M₂ G₃ R₁ S
Basant /Vasant {Hindustani}	S G₃ M₂ D₁ N₃ Ṡ	Ṡ N₃ D₁ P M₂ G₃ M₂ N₃ D₁ M₂ G₃ R₁ S (Anya swara* : M₁)
Basant Bahār {Hindustani}	S M₂ P G₃ M₂ N₃ D₁ N₃ S	R₂ S N₂ D₂ P M₁ G₂ M₁ G₂ R₂ S
Bhogavasantha	S R₁ G₃ M₂ D₁ N₃ Ṡ	Ṡ N₃ D₁ M₂ G₃ R₁ S
Deepakam	S R₂ M₂ P D₁ P Ṡ	Ṡ N₃ D₁ N₃ P M₂ G₃ R₁ S
Gamakapriyā	S R₁ G₃ M₂ P N₃ D₁ Ṡ	Ṡ D₁ P M₂ G₃ R₁ S
Gamanapriyā	S R₁ G₃ M₂ P N₃ D₁ Ṡ	Ṡ D₁ P M₂ G₃ R₁ S
Hamsanārāyani	S R₁ G₃ M₂ P Ṡ	Ṡ N₃ P M₂ G₃ R₁ S
Indumathi	S G₃ M₂ D₁ N₃ Ṡ	Ṡ N₃ D₁ P M₂ G₃ S
Kamalāptapriyā	S R₁ G₃ M₂ P D₁ Ṡ	Ṡ D₁ P M₂ G₃ R₁ S
Kumudhakriyā	S R₁ G₃ M₂ D₁ Ṡ	Ṡ N₃ D₁ M₂ G₃ R₁ S
Māruthi	S R₁ M₂ P N₃ Ṡ	Ṡ N₃ D₁ P M₂ G₃ R₁ S
Ponni	S G₃ M₂ P N₃ Ṡ	Ṡ N₃ P M₂ G₃ R₁ S
Prathāpa	S G₃ M₂ D₁ N₃ Ṡ	Ṡ N₃ D₁ P M₂ G₃ R₁ S
Puriya Dhanashree {Hindustani}	N₃ R₁ G₃ M₂ P D₁ P N₃ S	R₁ N₃ D₁ P M₂ G₃ M₂ R₁ G₃ R₁ S
Tāndavapriyā	S R₁ G₃ M₂ P Ṡ	Ṡ P M₂ G₃ R₁ S
**52 Rāmapriyā**	S R₁ G₃ M₂ P D₂ N₂ Ṡ	Ṡ N₂ D₂ P M₂ G₃ R₁ S
**Ramāmanohari**	S R₁ G₃ M₂ P D₂ Ṡ	Ṡ N₂ D₂ P M₂ G₃ R₁ S
Chintaramani	S G₃ M₂ P D₂ N₂ Ṡ	Ṡ D₂ P M₂ G₃ R₁ S
Hamsagamini	S G₃ M₂ P D₂ N₂ Ṡ	Ṡ N₂ D₂ P M₂ D₂ P M₂ G₃ R₁ S
Lokaranjani	S G₃ M₂ P M₂ D₂ N₂ Ṡ	Ṡ N₂ D₂ N₂ P M₂ G₃ R₁ S
Meghashyāmala	S G₃ M₂ P D₂ N₂ D₂ P Ṡ	Ṡ N₂ D₂ P M₂ G₃ R₁ S
Namoveenapaani (creation by Siri Girish)	S G₃ M₂ D₂ N₂ Ṡ	Ṡ N₂ D₂ M₂ G₃ R₁ S
Patalāmbari	S R₁ G₃ M₂ D₂ Ṡ	Ṡ D₂ M₂ G₃ R₁ S
Raktimārgini	S P M₂ D₂ N₂ Ṡ	Ṡ N₂ D₂ P M₂ P G₃ R₁ S
Rasavinodini	S G₃ M₂ P D₂ N₂ Ṡ	Ṡ N₂ D₂ P M₂ G₃ S
Reethi Chandrikā	S R₁ G₃ M₂ P D₂ Ṡ	Ṡ N₂ D₂ P M₂ G₃ R₁ S
Seemantinipriyā	S R₁ G₃ M₂ D₂ N₂ Ṡ	Ṡ N₂ D₂ M₂ G₃ R₁ S
Sukhakari	S R₁ S P D₂ N₂ Ṡ	Ṡ N₂ D₂ P M₂ G₃ S R₁ S
Vedhaswaroopi	S R₁ G₃ M₂ P D₂ N₃ P Ṡ	Ṡ N₃ D₂ P N₃ P M₂ G₃ S
**53 Gamanāśrama**	S R₁ G₃ M₂ P D₂ N₃ Ṡ	Ṡ N₃ D₂ P M₂ G₃ R₁ S
**Gamakakriyā**	S R₁ G₃ M₂ P D₂ Ṡ	Ṡ N₃ D₂ P M₂ G₃ R₁ S
Alankāri	S G₃ M₂ D₂ N₃ D₂ Ṡ	Ṡ N₃ D₂ M₂ G₃ S
Bhatiyār {Hindustani}	S D₂ P D₂ M₂ P G₃ M₂ D₂ S	R₁ N₃ D₂ P M₂ P G₃ R₁ S (Anya swara* : M₁)
Dvigāndhārabhooshani	S R₁ G₂ G₃ G₂ P D₂ Ṡ	Ṡ D₂ P G₂ G₃ G₂ R₁ S D₂ S
Hamsānandi	S R₁ G₃ M₂ D₂ N₃ Ṡ	Ṡ N₃ D₂ M₂ G₃ R₁ S
Mechakāngi	S R₁ G₃ M₂ P D₂ P N₃ Ṡ	Ṡ N₃ P D₂ P M₂ G₃ R₁ S
Padmakalyāni	S G₃ P N₃ Ṡ	Ṡ N₃ D₂ P M₂ G₃ S
Poorvi Kalyāni	S R₁ G₃ M₂ P D₂ P Ṡ	Ṡ N₃ D₂ P M₂ G₃ R₁ S
Sharabadhvāja	S R₁ G₃ M₂ P D₂ Ṡ	Ṡ D₂ P G₃ R₁ S
Sohini {Hindustani}	S G₃ M₂ D₂ N₃ Ṡ	Ṡ N₃ D₂ M₂ G₃ R₁ S
Vaishaka	S R₁ G₃ M₂ P D₂ N₃ Ṡ	Ṡ N₃ D₂ N₃ P M₂ G₃ M₂ R₁ S
**54 Viśvambari**	S R₁ G₃ M₂ P D₃ N₃ Ṡ	Ṡ N₃ D₃ P M₂ G₃ R₁ S
**Vamshavathi**	S R₁ G₃ M₂ P D₃ N₃ Ṡ	Ṡ N₃ P M₂ G₃ R₁ S
Hemāngi	S R₁ G₃ M₂ D₃ Ṡ	Ṡ D₃ M₂ G₃ R₁ S
Pooshakalyāni	S R₁ G₃ M₂ P D₃ N₃ Ṡ	Ṡ N₃ P M₂ G₃ R₁ S
Sharadhyuthi	S R₁ G₃ M₂ P D₃ N₃ D₃ Ṡ	Ṡ N₃ D₃ P M₂ G₃ R₁ S
Suddhakriyā	S R₁ M₂ M₂ P D₃ Ṡ	Ṡ D₃ P M₂ G₃ R₁ S
Sundarāngi	S R₁ G₃ P D₃ N₃ Ṡ	Ṡ N₃ D₃ P G₃ R₁ S
Vijayavasantham	S M₂ P D₃ N₃ Ṡ	Ṡ N₃ P M₂ G₃ S
**55 Śāmaḻāngi**	S R₂ G₂ M₂ P D₁ N₁ Ṡ	Ṡ N₁ D₁ P M₂ G₂ R₂ S
**Shyāmalam**	S R₂ G₂ M₂ P D₁ N₁ Ṡ	Ṡ N₁ D₁ P M₂ G₂ R₂ S
Deshāvali	S R₂ G₂ M₂ D₁ N₁ D₁ Ṡ	Ṡ N₁ D₁ M₂ G₂ R₂ S
Vijayamālavi	S R₂ M₂ P D₁ Ṡ	Ṡ N₁ D₁ P M₂ R₂ S
**56 Śanmukhapriyā**	S R₂ G₂ M₂ P D₁ N₂ Ṡ	Ṡ N₂ D₁ P M₂ G₂ R₂ S
**Chāmaram**	S R₂ M₂ P D₁ N₂ Ṡ	Ṡ N₂ D₁ P M₂ G₂ R₂ S
Bhāshini	S G₂ R₂ G₂ M₂ P D₁ N₂ Ṡ	Ṡ N₂ D₁ P M₂ G₂ R₁ S
Chintāmani	S G₂ R₂ G₂ M₂ G₂ R₂ G₂ P M₂ P D₂ N₂ Ṡ	Ṡ N₂ D₂ P M₂ G₂ R₂ S
Dhanakari	S G₂ P D₁ N₂ Ṡ	Ṡ N₂ D₁ M₂ G₂ S
Garigadya	N₂ S G₂ M₂ P D₁ N₂	D₁ P M₂ G₂ R₂ S
Gopikathilakam	S R₂ G₂ M₂ P N₂ Ṡ	Ṡ N₂ P M₂ G₂ R₂ S
Kokilanandhi	S G₂ M₂ D₁ N₂ Ṡ	Ṡ N₂ D₁ P M₂ G₂ S
Rājeshwari	S R₂ G₂ P N₂ Ṡ	Ṡ N₂ D₁ P M₁ G₂ S
Samudrapriyā	S G₂ M₂ P N₂ Ṡ	Ṡ N₂ P M₂ G₂ S
Shanmukhi (Trimoorti)	S R₁ G₂ M₂ D₁ N₂ Ṡ	Ṡ N₂ D₁ M₂ G₂ R₁ S
Sumanasaranjani	S G₂ M₂ P N₂ Ṡ	Ṡ N₂ P M₂ G₂ S
Vasukari	S G₂ M₂ P D₁ N₂ Ṡ	Ṡ N₂ D₁ M₂ G₂ S
**57 Simhendramadhyamam**(Sumadhyuti)	S R₂ G₂ M₂ P D₁ N₃ Ṡ	Ṡ N₃ D₁ P M₂ G₂ R₂ S
Ānandavalli	S G₂ M₂ P N₃ Ṡ	Ṡ N₃ P M₂ G₂ S
Ghantana	S R₂ G₂ M₂ D₁ N₃ Ṡ	Ṡ N₃ D₁ M₂ G₂ R₂ S
Jayachoodāmani	S G₂ M₂ P D₁ Ṡ	Ṡ N₃ D₁ P M₂ G₂ R₂ S
Pranavapriyā	S R₂ M₂ P N₃ Ṡ	Ṡ N₃ P M₂ G₂ R₂ S
Sarvāngi	S R₂ M₂ D₁ N₃ Ṡ	Ṡ N₃ D₁ M₂ G₂ S R₃ S
Seshanādam	S R₂ G₂ M₂ P D₁ Ṡ	Ṡ N₃ D₁ P M₂ G₂ R₂ S
Suddha	S R₂ G₂ M₂ P N₃ Ṡ	Ṡ N₃ P M₂ G₂ R₂ S
Sunādapriyā	S R₂ G₂ M₂ P Ṡ	Ṡ N₃ D₁ P M₂ G₂ R₂ S
Urmikā	S R₂ G₂ M₂ P N₃ Ṡ	Ṡ N₃ P M₂ G₂ R₂ S
Vijayasaraswathi	S G₂ M₂ P D₁ N₃ Ṡ	Ṡ N₃ P M₂ G₂ R₂ S
**58 Hemavati**	S R₂ G₂ M₂ P D₂ N₂ Ṡ	Ṡ N₂ D₂ P M₂ G₂ R₂ S
**Deshisimhāravam**	S R₂ G₂ M₂ P D₂ N₂ Ṡ	Ṡ N₂ D₂ P M₂ G₂ R₂ S
Chandrarekhā	S R₂ G₂ M₂ P D₂ Ṡ	Ṡ N₂ D₂ M₂ G₂ R₂ S
Hamsabhramari	S R₂ G₂ M₂ P D₂ Ṡ	Ṡ N₂ D₂ P M₂ G₂ R₂ S
Hemāmbari	S R₂ G₂ M₂ P D₂ N₂ Ṡ	Ṡ P M₂ G₂ R₂ S
Hemapriya	S R₂ G₂ M₂ D₂ Ṡ	Ṡ D₂ M₂ G₂ R₂ S
Kshemakari	S R₂ M₂ D₂ N₂ Ṡ	Ṡ N₂ D₂ M₂ R₂ S
Madhukowns	S G₂ M₂ P N₂ P Ṡ	Ṡ N₂ P M₂ G₂ S
Shakthiroopini	S G₂ M₂ D₂ Ṡ	Ṡ N₂ D₂ M₂ G₂ S
Simhārava	S R₂ M₂ P N₂ Ṡ	Ṡ N₂ P M₂ R₂ G₂ R₂ S
Vijayasāranga	S R₂ G₂ M₂ P D₂ Ṡ	Ṡ N₂ D₂ M₂ G₂ R₂ S
Vijayashrāngi	S R₂ G₂ M₂ P D₂ Ṡ	Ṡ N₂ D₂ M₂ G₂ R₂ S
Yāgini	S R₂ M₂ P N₂ Ṡ	Ṡ N₂ P M₂ R₂ S
**59 Dharmavati**	S R₂ G₂ M₂ P D₂ N₃ Ṡ	Ṡ N₃ D₂ P M₂ G₂ R₂ S
**Dhāmavathi**	S R₂ G₂ M₂ P D₂ N₃ Ṡ	Ṡ N₃ D₂ P M₂ G₂ R₂ S
Sri Tyagaraja (Raga created by Mahesh Mahadev)	S G₂ M₂ P N₃ Ṡ	Ṡ N₃ P M₂ G₂ R₂ S
Gowrikriya	S G₂ M₂ P D₂ N₃ Ṡ	Ṡ N₃ D₂ N₃ P M₂ G₂ S
Karmukhāvati	S R₂ G₂ M₂ D₂ N₃ Ṡ	Ṡ N₃ D₂ M₂ G₂ R₂ S
Karpoora Bharani	S R₂ G₂ P M₂ P D₂ Ṡ	Ṡ D₂ P M₂ P G₂ R₂ S
Lalitasimharavam	S R₂ G₂ M₂ P Ṡ	Ṡ N₃ P M₂ G₂ R₂ S
Madhumālti {Hindustani}	N₃ S G₂ M₂ P Ṡ	Ṡ N₃ D₂ P M₂ G₂ R₂ S (Anya swara* : M₁)
Madhuvanthi {Hindustani}	S G₂ M₂ P N₃ Ṡ	Ṡ N₃ D₂ P M₂ G₂ R₂ S
Moharanjani	S R₂ G₂ P D₂ Ṡ	Ṡ N₃ D₂ M₂ G₂ S
Ranjani	S R₂ G₂ M₂ D₂ Ṡ	Ṡ N₃ D₂ M₂ G₂ S
Varada	S R₂ M₂ P N₃ Ṡ	Ṡ N₃ P M₂ R₂ S
Vijayanāgari	S R₂ G₂ M₂ P D₂ Ṡ	Ṡ D₂ P M₂ G₂ R₂ S
Vishveshwarapriyā	S R₂ M₂ P N₃ Ṡ	Ṡ N₃ D₂ P M₂ R₂ S
**60 Nītimati**	S R₂ G₂ M₂ P D₃ N₃ Ṡ	Ṡ N₃ D₃ P M₂ G₂ R₂ S
**Nisshadham**	S R₂ G₂ M₂ P D₃ N₃ Ṡ	Ṡ N₃ P M₂ G₂ R₂ S
Amarasenapriyā	S R₂ M₂ P N₂ Ṡ	Ṡ N₃ P M₂ G₂ R₂ S
Deshyagānavaridhi	S R₂ G₂ M₂ P D₃ N₃ P Ṡ	Ṡ N₃ S P M₂ G₂ R₂ S
Hamsanādam	S R₂ M₂ P D₃ N₃ Ṡ S R₂ M₂ P N₃ S	S N₃ D₃ P M₂ R₂ Ṡ S N₃ P M₂ R₂ S
Kaikavashi	S R₂ G₂ M₂ P D₃ N₃ Ṡ	Ṡ N₃ P M₂ G₂ R₂ S
Nuthanachandrikā	S R₂ G₂ M₂ P D₃ N₃ Ṡ	Ṡ N₃ P D₃ N₃ P M₂ G₂ S
Rathnasāranga	S R₂ G₂ M₂ P N₃ Ṡ	Ṡ N₃ D₃ P M₂ G₂ R₂ S
**61 Kāntāmani**	S R₂ G₃ M₂ P D₁ N₁ Ṡ	Ṡ N₁ D₁ P M₂ G₃ R₂ S
**Kunthalam**	S R₂ G₃ M₂ P D₁ Ṡ	Ṡ N₁ D₁ P M₂ G₃ R₂ S
Kanakakusumāvali	S R₂ G₃ M₂ P D₂ Ṡ	Ṡ D₂ P M₂ G₃ R₂ S
Shruthiranjani	S R₂ G₃ M₂ P D₁ N₁	N₁ D₁ P M₂ G₃ R₂ S
**62 Riśabhapriyā**	S R₂ G₃ M₂ P D₁ N₂ Ṡ	Ṡ N₂ D₁ P M₂ G₃ R₂ S
**Rathipriyā**	S R₂ G₃ M₂ P D₁ N₂ Ṡ	Ṡ N₂ D₁ P M₂ G₃ R₂ S
Gopriya	S R₂ G₃ M₂ D₁ N₂ Ṡ	Ṡ N₂ D₁ M₂ G₃ R₂ S
Poornasāveri	S R₂ M₂ P D₁ Ṡ	Ṡ N₂ D₁ P M₂ G₃ R₂ S
Rathnabhānu	S R₂ M₂ P N₂ D₁ N₂ Ṡ	Ṡ N₂ D₁ P M₂ G₃ R₂ S
Suddha Sāranga	S G₃ M₂ P N₂ Ṡ	Ṡ D₁ P M₂ G₃ S
**63 Latāngi**	S R₂ G₃ M₂ P D₁ N₃ Ṡ	Ṡ N₃ D₁ P M₂ G₃ R₂ S
**Geethapriyā**	S R₂ G₃ M₂ P D₁ N₃ Ṡ	Ṡ N₃ D₁ P M₂ G₃ R₂ S
Chitrachandrika	S G₃ R₂ G₃ M₂ P N₃ D₁ Ṡ	Ṡ N₃ D₁ M₂ G₃ R₂ S
Hamsalatha	S R₂ G₃ P N₃ Ṡ	Ṡ N₃ D₁ P M₂ G₃ R₂ S
Kananapriyā	S R₂ G₃ M₂ P M₂ D₁ N₃ Ṡ	Ṡ D₁ N₃ P M₂ G₃ R₂ S
Karunākari	S M₂ P D₁ N₃ D₁ Ṡ	Ṡ N₃ D₁ P M₂ S
Lalithāngi	S R₂ G₃ M₂ D₁ N₃ Ṡ	Ṡ N₃ D₁ M₂ G₃ R₂ S
Ramani	S G₃ M₂ P N₃ Ṡ	Ṡ N₃ D₁ P M₂ G₃ S
Rathnakānthi	S R₂ G₃ M₂ P N₃ Ṡ	Ṡ N₃ P M₂ G₃ R₂ S
Raviswaroopini	S G₃ M₂ P D₁ N₃ Ṡ	Ṡ N₃ D₁ P M₂ G₃ S
Sajjananandhi	S R₂ G₃ M₂ P D₁ N₃ Ṡ	Ṡ N₃ D₁ M₂ G₃ R₂ S
Skandamanorama	S R₂ M₂ P N₃ Ṡ	Ṡ N₃ P M₂ R₂ S
**64 Vāchaspati**	S R₂ G₃ M₂ P D₂ N₂ Ṡ	Ṡ N₂ D₂ P M₂ G₃ R₂ S
**Bhooshāvathi**	S R₂ G₃ M₂ P D₂ N₂ Ṡ	Ṡ N₂ D₂ P M₂ G₃ R₂ S
Bhagavataranjana	S R₂ M₂ P D₂ N₂ Ṡ	Ṡ N₂ D₂ P M₂ G₃ R₂ S
Bhogeeshwari	S R₂ G₃ P D₂ N₂ D₂ Ṡ	Ṡ N₂ D₂ P M₂ G₃ R₂ S
Bhooshāvali	S R₂ G₃ M₂ P D₂ Ṡ	Ṡ N₂ D₂ P M₂ G₃ R₂ S
Dwigāndhārabhooshani	S R₁ G₂ G₃ G₂ P D₂ Ṡ	Ṡ D₂ P G₂ G₃ G₂ R₁ S D₂ S
Gaganamohini	S G₃ P D₂ N₂ Ṡ	Ṡ N₂ P M₂ G₃ S
Gurupriya	S R₂ G₃ M₂ D₂ N₂ Ṡ	Ṡ N₂ D₂ M₂ G₃ R₂ S
Hrdhini	S G₃ M₂ P N₂ Ṡ	Ṡ N₂ P M₂ G₃ S
Mangalakari	S R₂ P M₂ P D₂ N₂ Ṡ	Ṡ N₂ D₂ P G₃ R₂ S
Mukthidāyini	S G₃ M₂ P D₂ N₂ Ṡ	Ṡ N₂ D₂ P M₂ G₃ S
Nādhabrahma	S P M₂ P D₂ N₂ Ṡ	Ṡ N₂ D₂ P M₂ G₃ S
Pranavākāri	P N₂ D₂ N₂ S R₂ G₃ M₂	P M₂ G₃ R₂ S N₂ D₂ N₂ P
Saraswathi	S R₂ M₂ P D₂ Ṡ	Ṡ N₂ D₂ P M₂ R₂ S
Shivaranjani (Original)	S R₂ G₃ M₂ D₂ P N₂ Ṡ	Ṡ N₂ D₂ P D₂ M₂ G₃ R₂ S
Triveni	S R₂ M₂ P D₂ N₂ Ṡ	Ṡ N₂ D₂ P M₂ R₂ S
Utthari	S G₃ M₂ P D₂ N₂ Ṡ	Ṡ N₂ D₂ M₂ G₃ S
**65 Mechakalyāni**	S R₂ G₃ M₂ P D₂ N₃ Ṡ	Ṡ N₃ D₂ P M₂ G₃ R₂ S
**Shānthakalyāni**	S R₂ G₃ M₂ P D₂ N₃ Ṡ	Ṡ N₃ D₂ P M₂ G₃ R₂ S
Amritha Kalyani (Raga created by Mahesh Mahadev)	S G₃ M₂ P N₃ Ṡ	Ṡ N₃ D₂ P M₂ G₃ R₂ S
Amritha Behāg	S M₂ G₃ P N₃ S	D₂ N₃ D₂ M₂ G₃ S
Aprameya	S R₂ M₂ P D₂ Ṡ	Ṡ N₃ D₂ M₂ G₃ M₂ R₂ S
Bhoopkalyāni	S R₂ G₃ P D₂ Ṡ	Ṡ N₃ D₂ P M₂ G₃ R₂ S
Bhoopāli {Hindustani}	S R₂ G₃ P D₂ Ṡ	Ṡ D₂ P G₃ R₂ S
Chandrakāntha	S R₂ G₃ M₂ P D₂ N₃ Ṡ	Ṡ N₃ D₂ N₃ P M₂ G₃ R₂ S
Hameer {Hindustani}	S R₂ S G₃ M₁ D₂ N₃ D₂ Ṡ	Ṡ N₃ D₂ N₃ P G₃ M₁ D₂ M₂ P D₂ P G₃ M₁ R₂ S (Anya swara* : M₁)
Hameer Kalyāni {carnatic interpretation of Kedar}	S P M₂ P D₂ N₃ Ṡ S R₂ S P M₂ P D₂ N₃ Ṡ S R₂ S P M₂ N₃ D₂ S N₃ Ṡ S R₂ G₃ M₂ P D₂ N₃ P D₂ P Ṡ S P M₂ P D₂ N₃ Ṡ	Ṡ N₃ D₂ P M₂ M₁ G₃ P M₁ R₂ Ṡ S N₃ D₂ P M₂ G₃ M₁ G₃ R₂ Ṡ S N₃ D₂ P M₂ G M₁ R₂ S S N₃ D₂ P G₃ M₁ G₃ R₂ Ṡ S N₃ D₂ P G₃ M₁ G₃ R₂ S (Anya swara* : M₁ N₂)
Hamsakalyāni	S R₂ G₃ P N₃ Ṡ	Ṡ N₃ D₂ P M₂ G₃ R₂ S
Kalyānadāyini	S R₂ G₃ M₂ D₂ N₃ Ṡ	Ṡ N₃ D₂ M₂ G₃ R₂ S
Kannadamaruva	S G₃ M₂ P D₂ N₃ Ṡ	Ṡ N₃ D₂ P M₂ G₃ S
Kedār {Hindustani}	S *M₁(G₃)P D₂ N₃ Ṡ	Ṡ N₃ D₂ P M₂ P *M₁ S R₂ S (Anya swara* : M₁)
Kowmoda	S R₂ G₃ M₂ N₃ Ṡ	Ṡ N₃ P M₂ G₃ S
Kunthalashreekānti	S G₃ M₂ P D₂ N₃ Ṡ	Ṡ N₃ P M₂ G₃ R₂ S
Mohana Kalyāni	S R₂ G₃ P D₂ Ṡ	Ṡ N₃ D₂ P M₂ G₃ R₂ S
Mrgānandhana	S R₂ G₃ D₂ N₃ Ṡ	Ṡ N₃ D₂ M₂ D₂ G₃ R₂ S
Nada Kalyani (Raga created by Mahesh Mahadev)	S R₂ M₂ P N₃ Ṡ	Ṡ N₃ D₂ M₂ G₃ R₂ S
Nāndhakalyāni	S G₃ M₂ D₂ N₃ Ṡ	Ṡ N₃ D₂ M₂ G₃ M₂ R₂ S
Pramodhini	S G₃ M₂ P D₂ Ṡ	Ṡ D₂ P M₂ G₃ S
Rajasadhaka (Raga created by Mahesh Mahadev)	S R₂ G₃ P D₂ Ṡ	Ṡ N₃ P M₂ R₂ S
Sāranga	S R₂ G₃ M₂ P D₂ N₃ Ṡ S R₂ S P M₂ P D₂ N₃ Ṡ S P M₂ P D₂ N₃ Ṡ	Ṡ N₃ D₂ P M₂ R₂ G₃ M₁ R₂ Ṡ S N₃ S D₂ P M₂ R₂ G₃ M₁ R₂ Ṡ S N₃ D₂ P M₂ R₂ G₃ M₁ R₂ S (Anya swara* : M₁)
Sāranga Tārangini	S R₂ M₂ P D₂ N₃ Ṡ	Ṡ N₃ D₂ P M₂ R₂ S
Shilangi	S G₃ M₂ P N₃ Ṡ	Ṡ N₃ P M₂ G₃ S
Shuddha Sārang {Hindustani}	N₃ S R₂ M₂ P N₃ Ṡ	Ṡ N₃ D₂ P M₂ P M₁ R₂ S N₃ S (Anya swara* : M₁)
Suddha Koshala	S G₃ M₂ P Ṡ	Ṡ N₃ D₂ M₂ G₃ R₂ S
Shyām Kalyān {Hindustani}	N₃ S R₂ M₂ P N₃ Ṡ	Ṡ N₃ D₂ P M₂ P D₂ P G₃ M₁ P G₃ M₁ R₂ S N₃ S (Anya swara* : M₁)
Sunādavinodini / Hindol of Hindustani	S G₃ M₂ D₂ N₃ Ṡ	Ṡ N₃ D₂ M₂ G₃ S
Swayambhooshwara Rāga	S G₃ P Ṡ	Ṡ P G₃ S
Vandanadhārini	S R₂ M₂ P D₂ Ṡ	Ṡ D₂ P M₂ R₂ S
Vivāhapriyā	S R₂ M₂ P D₂ N₃ Ṡ	Ṡ N₃ D₂ P M₂ R₂ S
Yamuna Kalyāni / Yaman Kalyan {Hindustani}	S R₂ G₃ M₂ P D₂ N₃ Ṡ	Ṡ N₃ D₂ P M₂ G₃ M₁ G₃ R₂ S (Anya swara* : M₁)
**66 Chitrāmbari**	S R₂ G₃ M₂ P D₃ N₃ Ṡ	Ṡ N₃ D₃ P M₂ G₃ R₂ S
**Chaturāngini**	S R₂ G₃ M₂ P N₃ Ṡ	Ṡ N₃ D₃ N₃ P G₃ M₂ G₃ R₂ S
Amritavarshini	S G₃ M₂ P N₃ Ṡ	Ṡ N₃ P M₂ G₃ S
Chitrasindhu	S G₃ M₂ P N₃ Ṡ	Ṡ N₃ D₃ P M₂ G₃ R₂ S
Churnikavinodhini	S R₂ G₃ M₂ P D₃ N₃ Ṡ	Ṡ N₃ D₃ N₃ P M₂ G₃ R₂ S
Vijayakoshalam	S R₂ G₃ M₂ P Ṡ	Ṡ N₃ P M₂ G₃ S
**67 Sucharitrā**	S R₃ G₃ M₂ P D₁ N₁ Ṡ	Ṡ N₁ D₁ P M₂ G₃ R₃ S
**Santhāna Manjari**	S R₃ G₃ M₂ P D₁ Ṡ	Ṡ N₁ D₁ P M₂ R₃ S
**68 Jyothisvarūpiṇi**	S R₃ G₃ M₂ P D₁ N₂ Ṡ	Ṡ N₂ D₁ P M₂ G₃ R₃ S
**Jyothi**	S R₃ G₃ M₂ P D₁ N₂ Ṡ	Ṡ N₂ D₁ P M₂ G₃ S
Deepavarāli	S R₃ M₂ P N₂ Ṡ	Ṡ N₂ P M₂ G₃ R₃ S
Jyothishmathi	S R₃ G₃ M₂ P Ṡ	Ṡ N₂ D₁ M₂ P M₂ G₃ R₃ S
Rāmagiri	S R₃ M₂ G₃ M₂ P D₁ N₂ Ṡ	Ṡ D₁ N₂ D₁ P M₂ G₃ R₃ S
**69 Dhātuvardhani**	S R₃ G₃ M₂ P D₁ N₃ Ṡ	Ṡ N₃ D₁ P M₂ G₃ R₃ S
**Dhowtha Panchamam**	S R₃ G₃ M₂ P N₃ P Ṡ	Ṡ N₃ D₁ P M₂ R₃ G₃ M₂ R₃ S
Dhwithiyapanchamam	S R₃ G₃ M₂ P N₃ P Ṡ	Ṡ N₃ D₁ P M₂ R₃ M₂ G₃ R₃ S
Sumukham	S R₃ M₂ N₃ Ṡ	Ṡ N₃ M₂ R₃ S
Tavapriyā	S R₃ M₂ P N₃ Ṡ	Ṡ N₃ D₁ P M₂ G₃ R₃ S
**70 Nāsikābhūśaṇi**	S R₃ G₃ M₂ P D₂ N₂ Ṡ	Ṡ N₂ D₂ P M₂ G₃ R₃ S
**Nāsāmani**	S R₃ S M₂ P D₂ N₂ Ṡ	Ṡ N₂ D₂ P M₂ G₃ R₃ S
Marakathagowla	S R₃ M₂ P D₂ N₂ Ṡ	Ṡ N₂ D₂ P M₂ G₃ R₃ S
Thilakamandāri	S R₃ M₂ P D₂ Ṡ	Ṡ D₂ P M₂ G₃ R₃ S
**71 Kōsalam**	S R₃ G₃ M₂ P D₂ N₃ Ṡ	Ṡ N₃ D₂ P M₂ G₃ R₃ S
**Kusumākaram**	S R₃ G₃ M₂ P D₂ N₃ Ṡ	Ṡ N₃ D₂ P M₂ G₃ R₃ S
Ayodhya	S G₃ M₂ P N₃ Ṡ	Ṡ D₂ P M₂ G₃ M₂ R₃ S
**72 Rasikapriyā**	S R₃ G₃ M₂ P D₃ N₃ Ṡ	Ṡ N₃ D₃ P M₂ G₃ R₃ S
**Rasamanjari**	S R₃ G₃ M₂ P D₃ N₃ Ṡ	Ṡ N₃ D₃ P M₂ G₃ R₃ S
Hamsagiri	S R₃ G₃ M₂ P D₃ N₃ Ṡ	Ṡ N₃ P D₃ N₃ P M₂ G₃ S
Ishtārangini	S R₃ M₂ P N₃ Ṡ	Ṡ N₃ D₃ P M₂ G₃ R₃ S
Nāgagiri	S G₃ M₂ P D₂ P Ṡ	Ṡ D₂ P M₂ G₃ S

== Other janyas ==
- āṣaḍhakannaḍa
- bhāvya
- bhet̄nia
- bhuvana manōhari
- dēshalam/dēśalam
- dēshikakhamāj/dēśikakhamāj
- dēshikasencuruṭi/dēśikasencuraṭi
- dēshya keeravāṇi/dēśya keeravāṇi
- gaṅgādhāriṇi
- harihamsa
- harikalyāṇi
- Harisaraswati
- Hindustāni bhairavi - uses all 12 notes
- Hindustāni gāndhāri
- Jālini
- Kamalāmanōhari
- Kannaḍa kāmbhōji/kannaḍa kāmbōdhi
- Karnāṭaka nāṭṭai
- karṇashravya/karṇaśravya
- Khaṇḍe
- Koṇḍamalahari
- Lāvaṇi
- Māṇikya
- Madhumādhavi
- Maitrabhāvini
- Manōllāsini
- Mishra khamāj/Miśra khamāj
- Mishra māṇḍ/Miśra māṇḍ
- Mishra tilang/Miśra tilaṅg - S G3 M1 P N3 S - S N3 P M1 G3 R2 S
- Mukundabhairavam
- Mukundamaṇirangu
- Mukundanandini
- Mukundashree/mukundaśrī
- Mukundavasanta
- Mukundavasantini
- Namoveenapaani/namōveeṇāpāṇi - Aro: S G3 M2 D2 N2 S, Ava: S N2 D2 M2 G3 R1 S (Creation by Siri Girish at the age of 12)
- Navakānti
- Parvatavardhini/parvatavardhani
- Padmashree/padmaśrī
- Pancabhoota
- Pancagata
- Poorṇavasanta
- Rāgadhwani
- Ragini raga
- Rājahamsini
- Rājalahari (Scale introduced by Maestro Ilaiyaraaja)
- Rājkowns/rājakauns
- Rāyagowla/rāyagaula
- Rojuvana
- Rudrabharaṇam
- Sampoorṇam
- Sanga
- Sarvānanda
- Sarvashakti
- Savitā
- Shiva kalyāṇam
- Shree chintāmaṇi
- Shreekāntimati
- Shubhakalyāṇi
- Siddhēśvara
- Shuddha cintāmaṇi
- Vasavanti/vāsavanti

== See also ==
- List of film songs based on ragas
- List of composers who created ragas
