= List of compositions by Muthuswami Dikshitar =

Muthuswami Dikshita (IAST: Muttusvāmi Dīkṣita, 24 March 1775 – 21 October 1835) or Dikshitar was a South Indian poet and composer and is one of the musical trinity of Carnatic music. His compositions, of which around 500 are commonly known, are noted for their elaborate and poetic descriptions of Hindu gods and temples and for capturing the essence of the raga forms through the vainika (veena) style that emphasises gamakas. They are typically in a slower speed (chowka kala). He is also known by his signature name of Guruguha which is also his mudra (and can be found in each of his songs). His compositions are widely sung and played in classical concerts of Carnatic music.

Muthuswami Dikshitar composed many kritis in groups. The following lists describe those groups and compositions that belong to each group.

== Maha Ganapati Krithis ==
There are 27 Dikshitar kritis on Ganapathi in and around Thiruvarur, out of which 16 kritis are the shodasha kritis, as the name suggests. The shodasha (16) forms of Ganapathi are Bala, Taruna, Bhakti, Veera, Shakti, Dwija, Siddhi, Uchishta, Vighna, Kshipra, Heramba, Lakshmi, Maha, Vijaya, Nritta and Urdhava. Other forms of Ganapathi, Dikshitar mentions are Rakta, Sweta, Ekadanta, Lambodara and Dhundi.

Kriti	Raga	Tala
Ucchishta Ganapathau	Kashiramakriya(Kamavardhini/Panthuvarali)	Adi
Ekadantam	Bilahari	Misra Chapu
Gajananayutam	Vegavahini(Chakravagam)	Chathushra Eka
Gananayakam	Rudrapriya	Adi
Ganarajena	Arabhi	Misra Chapu
Ganesha kumara	Jenjuti (Chenjuruti)	Chathushra Eka
Karikalabha	Saveri	Rupakam
Panchamatanga	Malahari	Rupakam
Maha Ganapatim Manasa	Nata	M.Chapu
Maha Ganapatim	Todi	Rupakam
Maha Ganapathe	Natanarayani	Adi
Rakta Ganapathim	Mohana	Adi
Lambodaraya	Varali	Khanda Chapu
Vallabha nayakasya	Begada	Rupakam
Vatapi Ganapatim	Hamsadhwani	Adi
Vamanga Stita	Athana	Khanda Eka
Vinayaka	Vegavahini(Chakravagam)	Rupakam
Shakti Sahita	Sankarabharanam	Tisra Eka
Sweta Ganapatim	Choodamani	Triputa
Siddhi vinayakam	Chamaram (Shanmughapriya)	Rupakam
Hastivadanaya	Navaroj	M.Chapu
Sri Gananatham	Eshamanohari	Rupakam
Sri Ganeshatparam	Ardhadesi	Jampa
Sri Mahaganapatira vatu mam	Gowla	Triputa
Sri Muladhara	Sri	Adi
Vighneshwaram	Malahari	Adi
Herambhaya	Athana	Rupakam

== Guruguha (Subramanya) Krithis ==
=== Guruguha Vibhakti Krithis ===
These are the Guruguha Vibhakti Kritis composed in Tiruttani Kshetra.

Vibhakti	Kriti	Raga	Tala
1-prathama	Shri Nathadi Guruguho Jayati Jayati	Maya Malava Gowla	Adi
2-dwitiya	Manasa Guruguha Rupam Bhajare	Ananda Bhairavi	Rupaka
3-trtiya	Sri Guruna Palitosmi	Padi	Rupaka
4-chaturthi	Guruguhaya Bhaktanugrahaya	Sama	Adi
5-panchami	Guruguhadanyam Najaneham	Bala Hamsa	Jhampe
6-shashti	Sri Guruguhasya Dasoham	Purvi	Misra Chapu
7-saptami	Sri Guruguha Swamini Bhaktim Karomi	Bhanumati	Khanda Triputa
Sambodhana	Sri Guruguha Murtte Chit shakti Sphurtte	Udaya Ravi Chandrika	Rupaka
Sambodhana	Shri Guruguha Tarayashu Mam	Deva Kriya (Suddha Saveri)	Rupaka

=== Other Krithis on Guruguha ===
Kriti	Raga	Tala	Kshetra / Deity	Description
Bala-Subrahmanyam Bhajeham	Surati	Adi	tiruccendUr	
Dandayudha-Panim Dandita Daitya Shrenim	Ananda Bhairavi	Rupaka	Palani	
Gajamba-nayako Rakshatu !	Janjhuti	Triputa	tirupparankunram	
Gajaadheesaadanyam	Nata Kuranji	miSra cApu	tirupparankunram	
Ganapati-sodaram Guruguham Bhajeham	Arabhi	Adi		This kriti may have been created by Ambi Dikshitar
Kumara Swaminam Guruguham Namami	Asaveri	Adi	pullirukkuvelur (Vaitheeswaran Kovil)	
Para Shivatmajam Namami Satatam	Yamuna Kalyani	Adi		
Parvati Kumaram Bhavaye	Nata Kuranji	Rupaka	virincipuram	
Purahara Nandana Ripu Kula Bhanjana	Hamir Kalyani	Adi		
Purahara Nandana Ripu Kula Bhanjana	Hamir Kalyani	Adi		There are two kritis which start with same pallavi
Sadhujana Vinutam Guruguham	Gita-priya	Triputa		
Saurasenesham Vallisham Subrahmanyam Bhajeham	Saura Sena	Adi		
Sharavanabhava Guruguham Shanmukham Bhajeham	Revagupti	Rupakam	tiruvAvinankudi	
Senapate Palaya Mam	Kasi Rama Kriya	Adi		
Shadanane Sakalam Arpayami	Khamas	Adi		
Shri Bala Subrahmanyagaccha	Bilahari	Misra Eka	Swami Sailam (Swami Malai)	
Shri Subrahmanyaya Namaste	Kambhoji	Rupaka		
Shri Subrahmanyo Mam Rakshatu	Todi	Adi	tiruccendUr	
Shri Swaminathaya Namaste	Kamas or khamaj	Jhampe	Swami Sailam (Swami Malai)	
Shri Vallipate Pahimam	Naga Swaravali	Eka		
Shrngara Shaktyayudha Dhara Sharavanasya Dasoham	Rama Manohari	Jhampe	Sikkil	
Subrahmanyena Rakshitoham	Suddha Dhanyasi	Adi	Kanka Sailam (Kaligu Malai)	
Swaminatha ParipalayasumamSwaminatha Paripalayasumam	Nata	Adi	swAmi sailam (Swamimalai)	
Swaminathena Samrakshitoham	Brndavani Saranga	Adi	swAmimalai	

== Devi Kritis ==
=== Kamalamba Navavarna Kritis ===
Here are the 11 songs in praise of Goddess Kamalamba in Tiruvarur.

Avarana	Kriti	Raga	Tala	Vibhakthi
Dhyana Kriti	Kamalambike Ashrita Kalpa Latike	Todi	Rupaka	
1	Kamalamba Samrakshatu Mam	Anandabhairavi	Misra Chapu	Prathama
2	Kamalambam Bhaja Re	Kalyani	Adi	Dwitiya
3	Sri Kamalambikaya Katakshitoham	Sankarabharanam	Chaturasra Rupakam	Tritiya
4	Kamalambikayai Kanakamsukayai	Kambhoji	Khanda Ata	Chaturdhi
5	Sri Kamalambikayah Param Nahi Re	Bhairavi	Misra Jampa	Panchami
6	Kamalambikayastava Bhaktoham	Punnagavarali	Rupakam	Shasti
7	Sri Kamalambikayam Bhaktim Karomi	Sahana	Tisra Triputa	Saptami
8	Sri Kamalambike Avava	Ghanta	Adi	Sambodhana - Prathama
9	Sri Kamalamba Jayati	Ahiri	Rupakam	Prathama-Multiple Vibhaktis
Mangalasasanam	Sri Kamalambike Sive Pahi	Sri	Khanda Eka	Sambodhana - Prathama

=== Neelayadakshi Kritis ===
The Following kriti is on Goddess Neelayadakshi Ambal of Nagapattinam (Nagai Karonam).

Vibhakti	Kriti	Raga	Tala	Other Info
1.	Amba Neelayadakshi	Neelambari	Adi	

=== Nilotpalamba Vibhakti Krithis ===
The Following kritis are in the Nilotpalamba Vibhakti Krithis set. These songs are dedicated to Goddess Nilotpalamba in Thiruvarur.

Vibhakti	Kriti	Raga	Tala
1-Prathama	Nilotpalamba Jayati	Narayana Goula	Misra Chapu
2-Dwitiya	Nilotpalambam Bhajare	Nari Riti Goula	Triputa
3-Trtiya	Nilotpalambikaya Nirvana Sukhapradaya	Kannada Goula	Adi
4-Chaturdhi	Nilotpalambikayai Namaste	Kedara Goula	Adi
5-Panchami	Nilotpalambikayah Param Nahi Re	Goula	Rupaka
6-Shashti	Nilotpalambikayah Tava Dasoham	Maya Malava Goula	Triputa
7-Saptami	Nilotpalambikayam Bhaktim Karomi	Purva Goula	Rupaka
Sambodhana	Nilotpalambike Nitya Suddhatmike	Chaya Goula	Rupaka
Sambodhana	Sri Nilotpala Nayike	Nari Riti Goula	Rupaka

=== Mayuram (Mayiladuthurai) - Abhayamba Navavarana Krithis ===
Vibhakti	Kriti	Raga	Tala
1-prathama	Abhayamba Jagadamba	Kalyani	Adi
2-dwitiya	Aryam Abhayambam Bhajare	Bhairavi	Khanda Jati Ata
3-tritiya	Girijaya Ajaya Abhayambikaya	Sankarabharanam	Adi
4-chaturdhi	Abhayambikayai Aswarudhayai	Kambhoji	Adi
5-panchami	Abhayambikaya Anyam Najane	Kedara Gowla	Khanda Chapu
6-shashti	Ambikayah Abhayambikayah Tava Dasoham	Kedaram	Adi
7-saptami	Abhayambam Bhaktim Karomi	Sahana	Misra Chapu
Sambodhana	Dakshayani Abhayambike	Todi	Adi - Trisra Gati
Sambodhana	Sadasraye Abhayambike	Chamaram (Shanmukha Priya)	Rupaka

=== Kanchi - Kamakshi Devi Krithis ===
Kriti	Raga	Tala	Description
Avyajya Karuna Katakshi Anisham Mamava Kamakshi	Salanga Nata	Triputa	
Ekamresha Nayike Shive Shri Kamakshi Pahimam	Karnataka Shuddha Saveri	Rupakam	
Ekamreswara Nayakim Iswarim	Chamaram	Adi	
Kamakoti Pitha Vasini Saugandhini	Sugandhini	Adi	
Kamakshi Kamakoti Pitha Vasini Mamava	Suma Dyuti	Rupaka	
Kamakshi Mam Pahi Karunakari Shankari	Gamaka Kriya	Rupaka	
Kamakshi Mam Pahi Karunanidhe Shive	Suddha Desi	Rupaka	
Kamakshi Vara Lakshmi Kamalakshi Jaya Lakshmi	Bilahari	Adi	
Kamakshim Kalyanim Bhajeham	Kalyani	Trisra Eka	
Kanakambari Karunyamrta Lahari Kamakshi Mamava Kameshwari	Kanakambari (Kanakangi)	Trisra Eka	
Kanja Dalayatakshi Kamakshi	Kamala Manohari	Adi	
Namaste Para Devate Siva Yuvate Kamakshi	Deva Ranji	Trisra Eka	
Nirajakshi Kamakshi Nirada Chikure	Hindola	Rupaka	
Saraswati Manohari Sankari	Saraswati Manohari	Adi	
Srngara Rasamanjarim Sri Kamakshim Gourim	Rasa Manjari	Trisra Eka	

=== Madurai Maduramba (Meenakshi) Vibhakti Krithis ===
Muthuswamy Dikshitar visited Madurai for some time and composed two groups of krithis on Meenakshi Amman, (also called Madhuramba): Maduramba (Meenakshi) Vibhakti kritis and Minakshi Devi krithis.

Vibhakti	Kriti	Raga	Tala
Sambodhana	Sri Madhurambike Sri Sive Avava	Kalyani	Jhampe
Sambodhana	Sri Madhurapura Viharini	Bilahari	Rupaka
Sambodhana	Madhuramba Samrakshatu Mam	Deva Kriya	Adi
1-prathama	Madhuramba Jayati Marakatangi Jayati	Pharaju	Misra Chapu
2-dwitiya	Madhurambam Bhajare Re Manasa	Stavaraja (46)	Adi
3-tritiya	Sri Madhurambikaya Samrakshitoham	Athana	Triputa
6-shashti	Madhurambayah Tava Dasoham	Begada	Triputa
7-saptami	Madhurambikayam Sada Bhaktim Karomi	Desi Simharavam	Rupaka

=== Madurai Meenakshi Devi Krithis ===
Kriti	Raga	Tala	Description
Mamava Minakshi Raja Matangi	Dhali Varali (39)	Misra Eka	
Minakshi Me Mudam Dehi	Gamaka Kriya	Adi	
Mamava Minakshi Raja Matangi	Dhali Varali (39)	Misra Eka	
Sri Minakshi Gouri Raja Syamale	Gouri	Rupaka	
Sri Minambikayah Param Nahire Re Chitta	Deva Gandharam	Rupaka	
Syamalangi Matangi Namaste	Syamala	Adi	

=== Thanjavur - Brihadeeswari Devi Krithis ===
Kriti	Raga	Tala	Description
Bhogacchhaya Nataka Priye	Bhogacchhaya Nata	Adi	
Bhushavatim Manju Bhashavatim Bjajeham	Bhushavati	Trisra Eka	
Brhadamba Madamba Jayati	Bhanumati	Adi	
Brhadambikayai Namaste Namaste	Vasanta	Misra Chapu	
Brhadiswarim Bhajare Re Chitta	Lalita Panchamam	Adi	
Brhannayaki Varadayaki	Andhali	Adi	
Palaya Mam Brhadiswari Bhakta Janavani Sankari	Todi	Rupaka	
Himagiri Kumari Iswari	Ravi Kriya	Adi	
Pamara Jana Palini Pahi Brhannayaki	Suma Dyuti (57)	Trisra Eka	
Saindhavi Raga Priye	Saindhavi	Adi	
Santana Manjari Sankari Satatam Pat Umam	Santana Manjari	Adi	
Satchidanandamaya Vijrmbhinim Smaramyaham	Kumbhini	Adi	
Srngaradi Nava Rasangi Brhadamba	Dhavalangi	Trisra Eka	

=== Thiruvanaikaval - Akhilandeshwari Kritis ===
Kriti	Raga	Tala	Description
Akhilandeshwari Rakshamam	Dwijavanti	Adi	
Ahilandeshwaryai Namaste	Arabi	Adi	
Sri Matah Shiva Vamanke	Begada	Adi	

=== Vaidya (Vaitheeswaran Koil) Balambika Kritis ===
Kriti	Raga	Tala	Description
Balambikayah Katakshitoham	Sriranjani	Adi	
Balambikayah Param Nahire	Kanada/Karnataka Kapi	Adi	
Balambikayah Tava Bhaktoham	Kedaragowla	Rupakam	
Balambikayai Namaste	Nattakuranji	Rupakam	
Bhajarere Chitta Balambikam	Kalyani	miSra cApu	
Balambike Pahi	Manoranjani	Matya	

=== Kashi (Varanasi) - Vishalakshi / Annapurna Devi Kritis ===
Kriti	Raga	Tala	Description
Annapurne Visalakshi	Sama	Adi	
Ehi Annapurne Sannidhehi	Punnaga Varali	Adi	
Kasi Visalakshim Bhajeham	Gamaka Kriya	Adi	
Visalaksim Viswesim Bhajare	Kasi Rama Kriya	Misra Chapu	

=== Kumbakonam - Mangalamba Krithis ===
Kriti	Raga	Tala	Description
Sri Mangalambikam Chidgagana Chandrikam	Ghanta	Misra Jhampe	

=== Tirukadaiyur - Abirami Krithis ===
Kriti	Raga	Tala	Description
Abhiraameem Akhila	Bhooshaavati	rUpakam	

=== Tirunelveli - kAntimati Krithis ===
Kriti	Raga	Tala	Description
Sri Kantimatim	Desi Simharavam	Adi	

=== Tiruvenkadu - Brahmavidyambika Krithis ===
Kriti	Raga	Tala	Description
Brahma Vidyambike	Kalyani	Adi	

=== Vedaranyam - Parvati Krithis ===
Kriti	Raga	Tala	Description
Sri Parvathi Paramesvarau	bauLi	Adi	

=== Rameswaram - Parvatavardhini Krithis ===
Kriti	Raga	Tala	Description
Parvatha Vardhani	Sama	Adi	

=== Tirucirapalli - Sri Sugandhi Kuntalambike Krithis ===
Kriti	Raga	Tala	Description
Sri Sugandhi Kuntalambike	Kuntalam	rUpakam	

=== Tiruvottiyur - Sri Tripura Sundari Krithis ===
Kriti	Raga	Tala	Description
Tripura Sundari Namostutae	Deva Manohari	Adi	
Tripura Sundari Shankari	Syama	Rupakam	

=== Srikalahasti - Jnanaprasunambika Krithis ===
Kriti	Raga	Tala	Description
Jnaanaprasoonaambikae	Kalyani	rUpakam	

=== Non-Kshetra kritis on Devi ===
Kriti	Raga	Tala	Description
Dandanathaya Rakshitoham	Khamas	Adi	
Gitichakra ratha stithayai	Kannada	Misra Chapu	
Guni Janadi Nuta Guruguhodaye	Gurjari	Adi	
Ishanadi Shivakara Shivakameshwara Vamankasthe Namaste	Sahana	Rupakam	
Kusumakara Vimanarudham	Ahiri	Adi	
Lalita Parameshwari Jayati	Surati	Adi	
Lalitambikam Chintayamyaham	Devakriya	Adi	
Lalitambikayai Lakshakotandya Nayikayai	Bhairavi	Misra Chapu	
Mahatripurasundari Mamava	Madhyamavati	Rupakam	
Matangi Sri Rajarajeshwari	Ramamanohari	Rupakam	
Parashaktim Bhajare Pamara	Rudrapriya	Adi	
Pratyangira Bhagavatim Sadanamamyaham	Nadanamakriya	Misra Chapu	
Sarasijanabha sodari	Nagagandhari	Rupakam	
Sri Rajarajeshwari	Pooranachandrika	Adi	
Sri Rajarajeshwarim Mahatripurasundarim	Madhyamavati	Rupakam	
Sri Rama Saraswati Sevitam Sri Lalitambam Bhavaye	Nasamani	Adi	
Sri Sulinim Srita Palinim	Saila Desakshi	Adi	
Trilochana Mohinim Tripuranim	Bhairavi	Adi	
Varahim Vaishnavim Vana Vasinim Sada Vandeham	Vegavahini	Misra Chapu	
Panchashat peeta roopini	karnataka devagandhari	Adi	

== Navagraha Kritis ==
The kritis on the nine grahas of Jyotisha Shastra composed by Muthuswami Dikshitar are:

#	Kriti	Raga	Tala	Planet	Other Info
1	Surya Murte Sundara Chayadhipate	Sourastra	Chaturasra Jati Dhruva	Sun	
2	Candram Bhaja Manasa	Asaveri	Chaturasra Jati Mathya	Moon	
3	Angarakamasryamyaham	Surati	Rupaka	Mars	
4	Budhamasryami Satatam	Nata Kuranji	'misra Jati Jhampe'	Mercury	
5	Brhaspate Tarapate	Atana	Trisra Jati Triputa	Jupiter	
6	Sri Sukra Bhagavantam	Pharazu	Chaturasra Jati Ata	Venus	
7	Divakara Tanujam	Yadukula Kambhoji	Chaturasara Jati Eka	Saturn	
8	Smaramyaham Sada Rahum	Rama Manohari (Ramapriya)	Rupaka	Rahu	
9	Mahasuram Ketumakam	Camaram (Shanmukhapriya)	Rupaka	Ketu	

== Shiva kritis ==
=== Pancha Bhoota Sthala Linga Kritis ===
These 5 compositions are based on the 5 elements in Hinduism; namely, sky, water, earth, fire, and air. As such, the manifestations of Lord Shiva in each of these 5 elements is portrayed in these pieces.

#	Kriti	Raga	Tala	Kshetra
1	Ananda Natana Prakasham	Kedaram	Misra Capu	Chidambaram - Akasa Linga
2	Sri Kalahastisha	Huseni	Jhumpa	Sri Kalahasti - Vayu Linga
3	Arunacala Natham	Saranga	Rupaka	Arunacalam (Tiruvannamalai) - Agni Linga
4	Cintaya Makanda Mulakandam	Bhairavi	Rupaka	Kancipuram - Prthvi Linga
5	Jambu Pate	Yamuna Kalyani	Tisra Ekam	Thiruvanaikaval - Appu/jala Linga

=== Tiruvarur - Panchalinga Kritis ===
#	Kriti	Raga	Tala
1	Sadachaleshwaram Bhavayeham	Bhupalam	Adi
2	Hatakeshwara Samraksha Mam	Bilahari	Misra Eka
3	Shri Valmika Lingam Chintaye Shivardhangam	Kambhoji	Ata
4	Anandeshwarena Samrakshitoham	Ananda Bhairavi	Misra Eka
5	Siddishwaraya Namaste	Nilambari	Misra Eka

=== Tiruvarur - Thyagaraja Vibhakti Krithis ===
Muthuswami Dikshitar composed 13 compositions in 8 Vibhaktis in praise of Sri Thyagarajeswara at Tiruvayur.

Vibhakti	Kriti	Raga	Tala	Info
1-Pratama	Tyagarajo Virajite	Athana	Trisra Eka	
2-Dwitiya	Tyagarajam Bhajare	Yadukula Kambhoji	Misra Eka	
2-Dwitiya	Tyagarajam Bhajeham Satatam	Nilambari	Rupaka	
2-Dwitiya	Tyagaraja Mahadhwajaroha	Sri'	Adi	
3-Trtiya	Tyagarajena Samrakshitoham	Salaga Bhairavi	Adi	
4-Chaturdhi	Tyagarajaya Namaste	Begada	Rupaka	
5-Panchami	Tyagaradanyam Najane	Darbar	Adi	
6-Shasti	Sri Tyagarasya Bhaktou Bhavami	Rudra Priya	Misra Chapu	
6-Shasti	Tyagaraja Yoga Vaibhavam	Ananda Bhairavi	Rupaka	
7-Saptami	Tyagaraje Krtyakrtyamarpayami	Saranga	Jhampe	
Sambodhana	Vira Vasanta Tyagara	Vira Vasanta	Adi	
Sambodhana	Tyagaraja Palayasu Mam	Goula	Adi	in Praise of Valmika Linga Murti

=== Mayuram - Mayuranatha Swami Krithis ===
Kriti	Raga	Tala
Abhayamba Nayaka Hari Sayaka	Ananda Bhairavi	Adi
Abhayamba Nayaka Vara Dayaka	Kedara Gowla	Adi
Gourisaya Namaste	Arabhi	Trisra Triputa
Mayuranadham Anisam Bhajami	Dhanyasi	Misra Chapu

=== Kanchi - Ekambareswara Krithis ===
Deekshitar lived in Kanchi for a few years. During that time, he composed three krithis on Ekambareswara, several krithis on Kamakshi and a couple on Varadaraja Swami of Vishnu Kanchi.

Kriti	Raga	Tala
Ekamranatham Bhajeham	Purva Kalyani	Adi
Ekamranathaya Namaste	Vira Vasanta	Rupaka
Ekaamra Naathaaya Namaste	Mukhaari	rUpakam
Ekaamresa Naayakeem	cAmaram	Adi
Ekamrananatheswarena Samrakshitoham	Chaturangini	Adi

=== Kanchi - Kailasanatha Krithis ===
Kriti	Raga	Tala
Kailaasa Natham	Vega Vaahini	Adi
Kailasa Nathena	Kambhoji	miSra cApu

=== Madurai - Somasundareshwara Kritis ===
Kriti	Raga	Tala
Halsyanatham Smarami	Darbaru	Adi
Palayamam Parvatisha	Kannada	Rupakam
Sundareshwaraya Namaste	Shankarabharanam	Rupakam
Somasundareshwaram Bhajeham	Shuddha Vasanta	Adi

=== Thanjavur - Brihadeeswara Krithis ===
Kriti	Raga	Tala	Description
Brhadisa Katakshena Pranino Jivanti	Jivantika	Trisra Eka	
Brhadiswaram Bhajre Re Chitta	Naga Dhwani	Adi	
Brhadiswaraya Namaste	Sankarabharanam	Adi	
Brhadiswaro Rakshtu Mam	Gana Sama Varali	Rupaka	
Nabhomani Chandragni Nayanam	Nabhomani	Triputa	
Nagabharanam Nagajabharanam Namami	Nagabharanam	Adi	
Palaya Mam Brhadiswara Palita Bhuvaneswara	Nayaki	Rupaka	
Stava Rajadi Nuta Brhadisa Tarayasu Mam	Stava Raja	Triputa	

=== Chidambaram - Nataraja Kritis ===
Kriti	Raga	Tala	Description
Chidambara Nataraja Murtim	Tanu Kirti	Trisra Eka	
Chidambara Natarajam Asrayami	Kedaram	Adi	
Chidambareswaram Chintayami	Bhinna Shadjam	Adi	
Kanaka Sabhapatim Bhajare Manasa	Malava Sri	Adi	
Sivakama Patim Chintayamyaham	Nata Kuranji	Adi	
Sivakameswaram Chintayamyaham	Arabhi	Adi	

=== Chidambaram - Siva Kameswari Kritis ===
Kriti	Raga	Tala	Description
Sivakameswarim Chintayeham	Kalyani	Adi	

=== Chidambaram - Govinda Raja Kritis ===
Kriti	Raga	Tala	Description
Govinda Rajam Upasmahe Nityam	Mukhari	Triputa	
Govinda Rajaya Namaste	Surati	Rupaka	
Govinda Rajena Rakshitoham	Mecha Bouli	Rupaka	

=== Tiruvaiyaru - Pranatartiharana Panchandishwara Kritis ===
Kriti	Raga	Tala	Description
Parameshwara Jagadishwara	Natta	Adi	
Pranatartiharam Namami	Nayaki	Adi	
Pranatariharaya Namaste	Samantam	Adi	
Sri Vatukanatha	Devakriya	Misra Chapu	

=== Tiruchengodu - Ardhanariswara Kritis ===
Kriti	Raga	Tala	Description
Ardha Naareesvaram	Kumuda Kriya	rUpakaM	

=== Rameswaram - Ramanatha Kritis ===
Kriti	Raga	Tala	Description
Ramanatham Bhajeham	Kasi Ramakriya	rUpakaM	

=== Kumbakonam - Kumbeswara Kritis ===
Kriti	Raga	Tala	Description
Kumbhesvaraaya Namastae	kalyANi	miSra cApu	
Kumbhesvaraaya Namastae	Kedaaram	rUpakam	
Kumbhesvarena	kalyANi	Adi	

=== Thiruvottiyur - Adipureeswara Kritis ===
Kriti	Raga	Tala	Description
Adipureesvaram	Arabhi	Adi	
Tiruvateesvaram	Gamaka Kriya	rUpakam	

=== Sankarankoil - Sankaranarayana Kritis ===
Kriti	Raga	Tala	Description
Sankara Narayanam	Narayana Desakshi	Adi	

=== Tirukazhukundram - Vedapureeswara Kritis ===
Kriti	Raga	Tala	Description
Vedapurisvaram	Dhanyasi	Adi	

=== Tirukadaiyur - Amritaghateswara Kritis ===
Kriti	Raga	Tala	Description
Sankaram Abhirami	Manohari	rUpakam	

=== Tiruvenkadu - Svetaranyeswara Krithis ===
Kriti	Raga	Tala	Description
Svetaranyesvaram	Arabhi	Adi	

=== Tiruvidaimarutur - Mahalingeswara Krithis ===
Kriti	Raga	Tala	Description
Mahalingesvaram	Paraju	Adi	
Mahalingesvaraya	Athana	Adi	

=== Vedaranyam - Vedaranyeswara Krithis ===
Kriti	Raga	Tala	Description
vEdAraNyESvarAya	tODi	Adi	

=== Tirunelveli - Salivatishwara (Nellaiappar) Krithis ===
Kriti	Raga	Tala	Description
Saalivaatisvaram	Deva Gandhari	Adi	

=== Tiruchirapalli - Matrbhuteshwara (Thayumanavar) Krithis ===
Kriti	Raga	Tala	Description
Sri Matrubhutam	Kannada	misra capu	

=== Kashi - Visweswara (Kashi Vishwanath) / Kala Bhairava Kritis ===
Kriti	Raga	Tala	Description
Kala Bhairavam Bhajeham Anisam	Bhairavam	Adi	
Kasi Visweswara Ehi Mam Pahi	Kambhoji	Ata	
Sri Viswanatham Bhajeham	Chaturdasa Raga Malika	Adi	
Viswanathena Rakshitoham	Samanta	Adi	
Visweswaro Rakshtu Mam	Kanada	Adi	
Viswanatham Bhajeham Satatam	Natabharanam	Rupakam	

=== Sri Vaidyanatha ===
Kriti	Raga	Tala	Description
Sri Vaidyanatham Bhajami	Athana	Adi	

== Vishnu Krithis ==
=== Sri Rama Chandra Vibhakti Krithis ===
Vibhakti	Kriti	Raga	Tala	Description	Kshetra
1-prathama	Sri Rama Chandro Rakshtu Mam	Sri Ranjani	Triputa		
2-dwitiya	Rama Chandram Bhavayami	Vasanta	Rupaka		
3-trtiya	Rama Chandrena Samrakshitoham	Manji	Rupaka		
4-chaturthhi	Rama Chandraya Namaste	Todi	Triputa		
5-panchami	Rama Chandradanyam Najaneham	Dhanyasi	Jhampe		
6-shasthi	Rama Chandrasya Dasoham	Dhamavati	Adi		
7-saptami	Rame Bharata Palita Rajyamarpayami	Jyoti	Jhampe		
Sambodhana	Rama Rama Kali Kalusha Virama	Rama Kali	Rupaka		

=== Other Krithis on Sri Rama ===
Kriti	Raga	Tala	Description	Kshetra
Kodanda Ramam Anisam Bhajami	Kokila Ravam	Adi		navapAsAnam (Devipattinam)
Mamava Pattabhirama	Mani Rangu	Misra Eka		Pattabirama and siMhAsanE sItayA saha saMsthita (Kumakonam Pattabhi Ramaswamy temple)
Mamava Raghu Vira Martyavatara	Mahuri	Misra Eka		navapAsAnam (Devipattinam)
Santana Rama Swaminam	Hindola Vasanta	Adi		Nida Mangalam(Yamunamba Puram)
Sri Ramam Ravi Kulabdi Somam	Narayana Gowla	Adi		Darbha Shayanam (ThiruppullAni)
Ramachandra Bhaktam	Geyahejjujji	Adi		

=== Anjaneya Krithis ===
Kriti	Raga	Tala	Description	Kshetra
Pavanatmajagacchha Paripurna Swacchha	Nata	Khanda Chapu		
Pavanatmajam Bhajare	Sankarabharanam	Adi		
Rama Chandra Bhaktam Bhaja Manasa	Geya Hejjajji	Adi		
Vira Hanumate Namo Namo	Kanada	Rupaka		

=== Sri Venkateswara Krithis ===
Kriti	Raga	Tala	Description	Kshetra
Prasanna Venkateswaram Bhajare	Vati Vasanta Bhairavi	Misra Chapu		Tanjavur
Sankha Chakra Gada Panim Aham Vande	Purna Chandrika	Rupaka		Tirumala Tirupati
Seshachala Nayakam Bhajami	Varali	Misra Eka		Tirumala Tirupati
Sri Venkata Girisam Alokaye	Surati	Adi		Gokarnam
Sri Venkatesam Bhajami Satatam	Kalyana Vasanta	Adi		Tirumala Tirupati
Venkatachalapate Ninu Nammiti	Kapi	Adi	This Is a Manipravala Kriti - Composed in 3 Languages: Telugu, Tamil and Sanskrit	Gokarnam

=== Srirangam Pancharatnam - Ranganatha Swami Krithis ===
Kriti	Raga	Tala	Description
Ranga Pura Vihara	Brndavana Saranga	Rupaka	
Ranganayakam Bhavaye	Nayaki	Adi	
Sri Ranganatham Upasmahe	Purna Chandrika	Adi	
Sri Ranganathaya Namaste	Dhanyasi	Adi	
Sri Bhargavi Badram	Mangala Kaishiki	Misra Chapu	

=== Narasimha Swami Krithis ===
Kriti	Raga	Tala	Kshetra	Description
Narasimha Agacchha	Mohana	Misra Eka	Ghatikachalam (Sholingur)	

=== Tirukkannamangai - Bhaktavatsala Krithis ===
Kriti	Raga	Tala	Kshetra	Description
Bhakta Vatsalam	Vamsavati	Adi		

=== Kanchipuram - Varadaraja Krithis ===
Kriti	Raga	Tala	Kshetra	Description
Varadaraja Avava	Ganga Tarangini	rUpakam		
Varadaraja Pahi	Sankarabharanam	tiSra Ekam		
Varadarajam Upaasmahe	Saranga	rUpakam		

=== Sri Krishna Krithis ===
Kriti	Raga	Tala	Kshetra	Description
Nanda Gopala Mukunda	Yamuna Kalyani	Adi	Udupi	
Balagopala Palayashumam	Bhairavi	Adi	Mannargudi - RajaGopala Swami	
Sri Satyanarayanam	Siva pantuvarALi	rUpakam	Badrinath	
Santana Gopalam Upasmahe	Khamas	Rupaka	Mannargudi - Santana Gopala Swami	
Sri Krishnam Bhajare	Rupavathi	rUpakam	Thanjavur	
Sri Krishno Mam	Nasamani	rUpakam	Kancipuram (Varadaraja Temple)	
Sri Parthasarathina	Suddha Dhanyasi	rUpakam	Tiruvallikeni Parthasarathi Temple	
Sri Krishnam Bhaja Manasa Satatam	Todi	Adi	Guruvayur	
Sri Sundara Rajam Bhajeham	Kasi Rama Kriya (45)	Adi	Madurai - Alagar Kovil (Vrshabhachalam)	
Soundara rajam ashraye	Brindavana saranga	Rupaka	Thirunagai soundarraja perumal Nagapattinam	
Chetah sri balakrishnam	Dwijavanthi	Rupaka	Guruvayoor	
Govardhana Girisham	Hindolam	Rupaka		
Balakrishnam Bhavayami	Gopika Vasantham	Adi		

== Sri Lakshmi Krithis ==
Kriti	Raga	Tala	Kshetra
Hari Yuvatim Hymavatim Aradhayami Satatam	Desi Simharavam	Trisra Eka	
Hiranmayim Lakshmim Sada Bhajami	Lalita	Rupaka	
Maha Lakshmi Karuna Rasa Lahari	Madhava Manohari	Adi	
Sri Bhargavi Bhadram Me Disatu	Mangala Kaisiki	Misra Eka	Srirangam
Sri Vara Lakshmi Namastubhyam	Sri	Misra Eka	
Vara Lakshmim Bhajare Re Manasa	Sourashtra	Adi	

== Saraswati Devi Krithis ==
Kriti	Raga	Tala	Description!Kshetra
Bharati mat-dishana-jadyapahe	Deva-manohari	Rupaka	Tiruvarur
Kalavati Kamalasana-yuvati	Kalavati	Adi	Kashmir Sharada Temple
namo namaste girvani	Girvani	Triputa	
Saraswati chaya-tarangini	Chaya-tarangini	Adi	
Saraswati Vidhi-yuvati	Hindolam	Rupaka	
Saraswatya bhagavatya samrakshitoham	Chaya-gaulam	Mishra ekam	
Sharavati-tata-vasini hamsini	Sharavati	Trishra ekam	
Shri Saraswati hitE	mAnji		
Shri Saraswati namostute	Arabhi	Rupakam	
Vina-pustaka-dharinim ashraye	Toya-vegavahini (16)	Khanda ekam	kanchipuram

== English Notes ==
Composition	Raga	Tala	Deity
Santatam Pahimam	Sankarabharanam	Rupakam	Parvati
Anjaneyam	Sankarabharanam	tiSra Ekam	Hanuman

== Non-group Krithis ==
Kriti	Raga	Tala	Deity	Kshetra
Kayarohanesham bhaja ! re ! re manasa	Deva-gandharam	Rupakam	Kayarohaneshwara (Siva)	Nagapatnam
Chintaye Mahalinga Murthim	Pharaju	Adi	Mahalingeshwara	Tiruvidaimarudur
Dharmasamvardhani	Madhyamavati	Rupakam	Dharmasamvardhani	Tiruvaiyaru
Shankaram Abhirami Manoharam	Kamala Manohari	Rupakam	Amritaghateshwarar	Thirikkadaiyur

== See also ==
- List of compositions by Tyagaraja

== Sources ==
- Iyer, A. Sundaram (1989). Sri Muthuswami Dikshitar Keertanaigal. Mylapore, Chennai: Music Books Publishers.
