= History of Shaktism =

The roots of Shaktism – a Hindu denomination that focuses worship upon Shakti or Devi, the Hindu Divine Mother – penetrate deeply into India's prehistory. The Devi's earliest known appearance in Indian paleolithic settlements is believed to go back more than 8000 years ago.

Shaktism as it exists today began with the literature of the Shankara Age, further evolved during the formative period of the Hindu epics, reached its full flower during the Khmer period, (1000CE) and continued to expand and develop thereafter. Devi Mahatmya, an important text in Shaktism, was composed around tenth or eleventh century CE. Here, for the first time, "the various mythic, cultic and theological elements relating to diverse female divinities were brought together in what has been called the 'crystallization of the Goddess tradition.'" Other important texts include the Lalita Sahasranama, the Devi Gita, Adi Shankara's Saundaryalahari and the Tantras.

Recent developments related to Shaktism include the emergence of Bharat Mata ("Mother India") symbolism, the increasing visibility of Hindu female saints and gurus, and the prodigious rise of the "new" goddess Santoshi Mata following release of the Indian film Jai Santoshi Maa ("Hail to the Mother of Satisfaction") in 1975.

== Early origins ==
To date, the earliest Mother Goddess figurine unearthed in India (near Prayagraj) belongs to the Upper Paleolithic, and carbon-dates to approximately 17,400 - 24,700 BCE. Also belonging to that period are some collections of colorful stones marked with natural triangles. Discovered near Mirzapur in Uttar Pradesh, they are similar to stones still worshiped as Devi by tribal groups in the area. Moreover, they "may demonstrate connections to the later Tantric use of yantras, in which triangles manifest a vital symbolism connected with fertility."

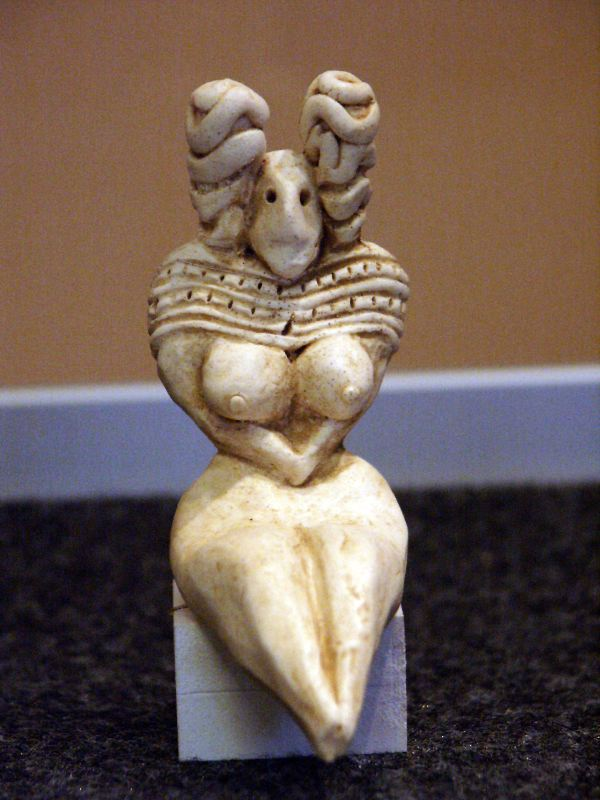
A Harappan goddess figurine, c. 3000 BCE. (Musée Guimet, Paris)

Thousands of female statuettes dated as early as c. 5500 BCE have been recovered at Mehrgarh, one of the most important Neolithic sites in world archeology, and a precursor to the great Indus Valley civilization. In Harappa and Mohenjo-daro, major cities of the Indus valley civilization, female figurines were found in almost all households indicating the presence of cults of goddess worship. Most figurines are naked and have elaborate coiffures. Some figurines have ornaments or horns on the head and a few are in poses that expose the genitals. Several small circular objects with holes in middle, possibly representing yoni, were also found. The objects and images found suggest that the goddess cults of Indus valley civilization were associated with fertility. A seal shows a male figure standing over a seated female figure with a sickle. It probably suggests an association between the female figure and crops, and possibly implies a ritual sacrifice where the blood of the victim was offered to the goddess for ensuring agricultural productivity.

Bhattacharya links the archaeological discoveries of Indus valley civilization to present-day Shaktism of later Hindu religion. Other scholars like David Kinsley and Lynn Foulston acknowledge some similarities between the cult of goddess in Indus valley civilization and Shaktism, but think that there is no conclusive evidence that proves a link between them.

According to Bhattacharya, the later Indus Valley population centers of Harappa and Mohenjo-daro (c. 3300 - 1600 BCE) included many people from nearby villages who brought their local beliefs and rituals with them. Among these was the Female Principle associated with agricultural communities, which became central to Indus Valley religion. Over time, these rituals were adopted and modified by the aristocracy.

As these philosophies and rituals evolved in the northern reaches of the subcontinent, additional layers of Goddess-focused tradition were expanding outward from the sophisticated Dravidian civilizations of the south. According to Bhattacharyya the "cult of the Female Principle was a major aspect of Dravidian religion," and the concept of Shakti was deeply embedded in their religion. The female deities underwent a process of syncretism and "eventually came to be identified with the Puranic Parvati, Durga or Kali." Bhattacharyya further notes that the Sapta Matrika, or Seven Divine Mothers, which are an important part of the Shakta religion, may also have Dravidian origins.

== Philosophical development ==
Shaktism as we know it began with the literature of the Vedic Age; further evolved during the formative period of the Hindu epics; reached its full flower during the Gupta Age (300-700 CE), and continued to expand and develop thereafter.

=== Vedas ===
As the Indus Valley Civilization slowly declined and dispersed, its peoples mixed with other groups to eventually give rise to the Vedic Civilization (c. 1500 - 600 BCE). Female divinity continued to have a place in belief and worship, but generally in a more subordinate role, with goddesses serving principally as consorts to the great gods.

The most important of the female deities mentioned in the Vedas is Ushas. Number of hymns in the Vedas are dedicated exclusively to her. The three divine mothers mentioned in the Rig Veda from whom the Vedic gods took their birth are Aditi, Prithvi and Saraswati. Prithvi continued to exist in later Hinduism as Bhudevi (goddess of the earth). According to Bhattacharyya, "it may be said that Aditi was the most ancient mother of the gods, whose features [had already become] obscure even in the Vedic Age. [...] The Harappan [Mother Goddess] was probably reflected in [the Vedic] conception of Aditi, thought to be a goddess of yore even in the Rigveda itself." Indeed, Vedic descriptions of Aditi are vividly reflected in the countless so-called Lajja Gauri idols (depicting a faceless, lotus-headed goddess in birthing posture) that have been worshiped throughout India for millennia.

The historically recurrent theme of the Devi's all-encompassing, pan-sexual nature arises explicitly for the first time in such declarations as: "Aditi is the sky, Aditi is the air, Aditi is all gods. [...] Aditi is the Mother, the Father, and the Son. Aditi is whatever shall be born."

Also significant is the appearance, in the famous Rig Vedic hymn Devi Sukta, of two of Hinduism's most widely known and beloved goddesses: Vāc, identified with the present-day Saraswati; and Srī, now better known as Lakshmi. In the hymn, still recited by thousands of Hindus each day, the Goddess unambiguously declares that she is the supreme source of all gods and creation, and is present throughout the universe and is ultimately beyond it.

=== Upanishads ===
The great Kena Upanishad (c. 750-500 BCE) tells an early tale in which the Devi appears as the shakti, or essential power, of the Supreme Brahman. It begins with the Vedic trinity of Agni, Vayu and Indra boasting and posturing in the flush of a recent victory over a demon hoard – until they suddenly find themselves bereft of divine power in the presence of a mysterious yaksha, or forest spirit. When Indra tries to approach and question the yaksha, it disappears, replaced by the Devi in the form of a "highly adorned" yakshini:

It was Uma, the daughter of Himavat. Indra said to her, 'Who was that yaksha?' She replied, 'It is Brahman. It is only through the victory of Brahman that you have thus become great.' After that Indra and the devas realized the Truth [...] having known Brahman through such direct experience.

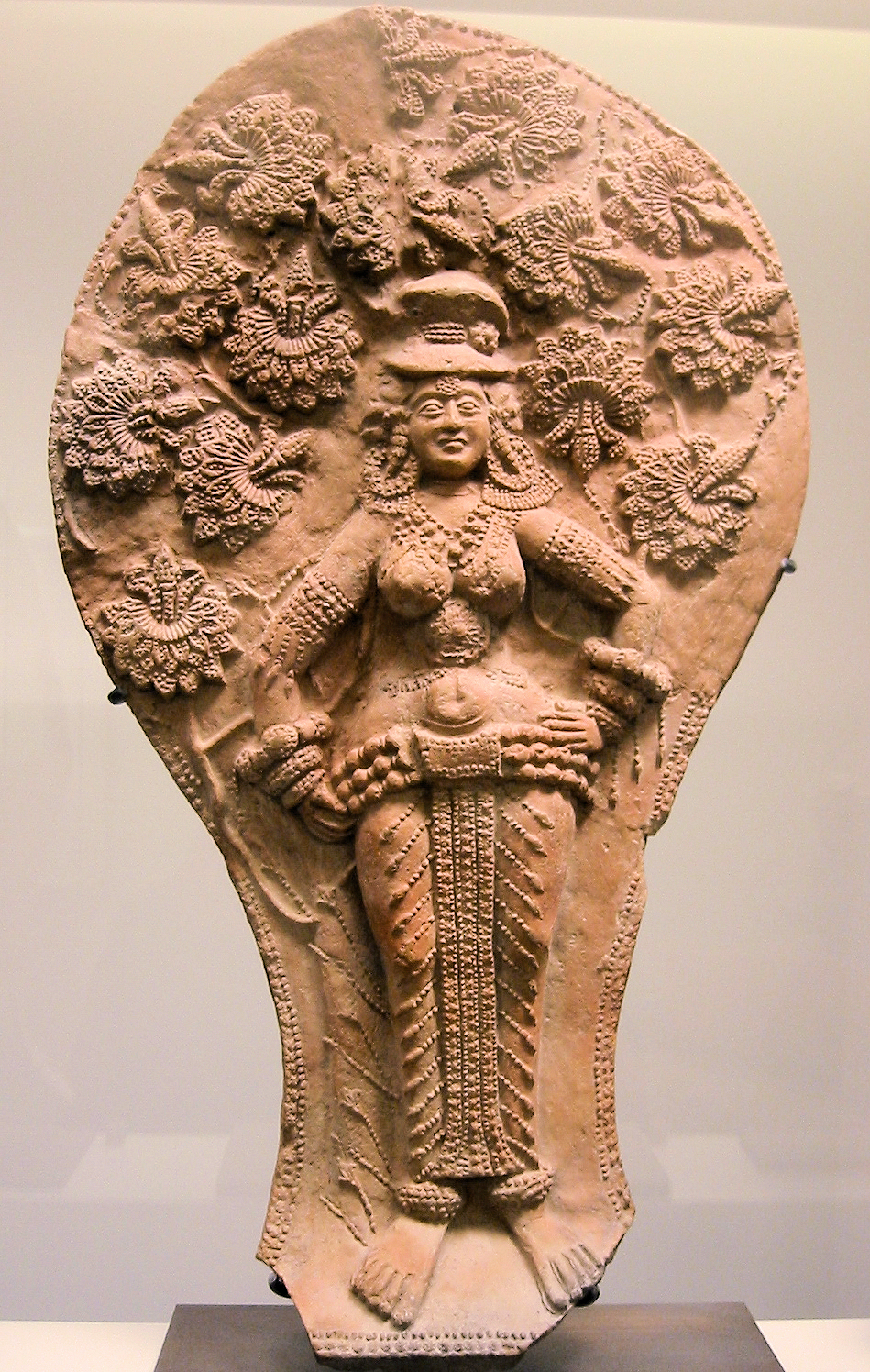
A yakshini, or forest deity; the form the Devi assumed in the Kena Upanishad as the dynamic aspect of Brahman. Shunga Empire, 2nd-1st century BCE. (Musee Guimet, Paris)

Significantly, Bhattacharyya notes that "a study of the extant yaksha and yakshini images [of this period] shows that the later images of the gods and goddesses were shaped after them."

The canonical Shakta Upanishads are much more recent, most dating between the 13th and 18th centuries, and generally relate to sectarian matters of Srividya worship. While their archaic Sanskrit usages "tend to create the impression that [they] belong to a hoary past, not one of the verses cast in the Vedic mold can be traced to a Vedic source."

=== Epic period ===
While "no goddess of a purely Shakta character" is mentioned in the great Vaishnava epic Ramayana (c. 200 BCE - 200 CE), the Mahabharata (c. 400 BCE - 400 CE) is full of references that confirm the ongoing vitality of Shakta worship.

Devi is also mentioned in Devyatharva sookta, Triporopanishad, and there are many verses in vedas regarding various forms of goddess. The main Goddess of the pantheon held as Durga the central goddess. Mahabharat The Great Epic thus refers to the goddess residing in the Vindhyas, the goddess who is fond of wine and meat (sīdhumāṃsapaśupriyā) and worshiped by the hunting peoples." The ongoing process of Goddess-worshiping indigenous peoples "coming into the fold of the caste system [also brought with it] a religious reflex of great historical consequence."

However, it is in the Epic's Durga Stotras that "the Devi is first revealed in her true character, [comprising] numerous local goddesses combined into one [...] all-powerful Female Principle." Meanwhile, the great Tamil epic, Silappatikaram (c. 100 CE) was one of several literary masterpieces amply indicating "the currency of the cult of the Female Principle in South India" during this period – and, once again, "the idea that Lakshmi, Saraswati, Parvati, etc., represent different aspects of the same power."

=== Puranas ===
Taken together with the Epics, the vast body of religious and cultural compilations known as the Puranas (most of which were composed during the Gupta period, c. 300 - 600 CE) "afford us greater insight into all aspects and phases of Hinduism – its mythology, its worship, its theism and pantheism, its love of God, its philosophy and superstitions, its festivals and ceremonies and ethics – than any other works."

Some of the more important Shakta-oriented Puranas include the Devi Purana and the Kalika Purana, in which Devi is described as "the supramental Prakriti" to whom the world owes its origin, "while she does not owe her origin to anything." By far, however, the most important Puranas from the Shakta standpoint are the Markandeya Purana, the Brahmanda Purana, and the Devi-Bhagavata Purana, from which the key Shakta scriptures are drawn.

==== Devi Mahatmya ====
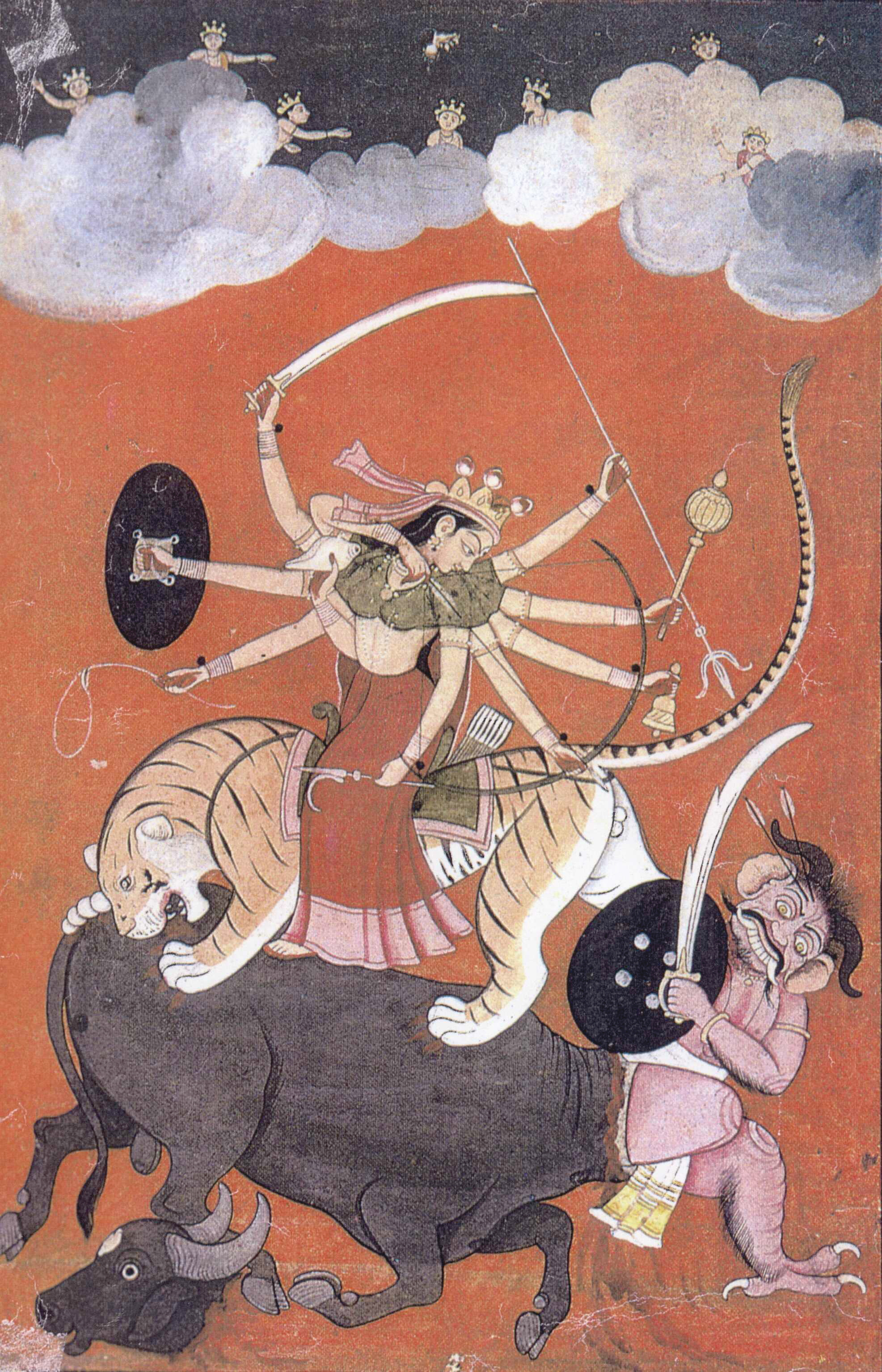
Devi portrayed as Mahishasura Mardini, Slayer of the Buffalo Demon – a central episode of the Devi Mahatmya, and one of the most famous in all of Hindu mythology.

The most vital text within Shaktism is the Devi Mahatmya (also known as the Durga Saptashati, Chandi or Chandi-Path) and it is embedded in the Markandeya Purana. The Devi Mahatmya was composed approximately 1,600 years ago. MacKenzie Brown notes that this text marks the first time distinct mythic, ritual, and theological elements related to various female divinities were unified into a cohesive Goddess tradition.

As the earliest Hindu scripture "in which the object of worship is conceptualized as Goddess, with a capital G", the Devi Mahatmya also marks the birth of "independent Shaktism"; i.e. the cult of the Female Principle as a distinct philosophical and denominational entity.

The influence of the cult of the Female Principle [had already] placed goddesses by the sides of the gods of all systems as their consorts, and symbols of their energy or shakti. But the entire popular emotion centering round the Female Principle was not exhausted. So need was felt for a new system, entirely female-dominated, as system in which even the great gods like Vishnu or Shiva would remain subordinate to the goddess. This new system – containing vestiges of hoary antiquity, varieties of rural and tribal cults and rituals, and strengthened by newfangled ideas of different ages – came to be known as Shaktism.

==== Lalita Sahasranama ====
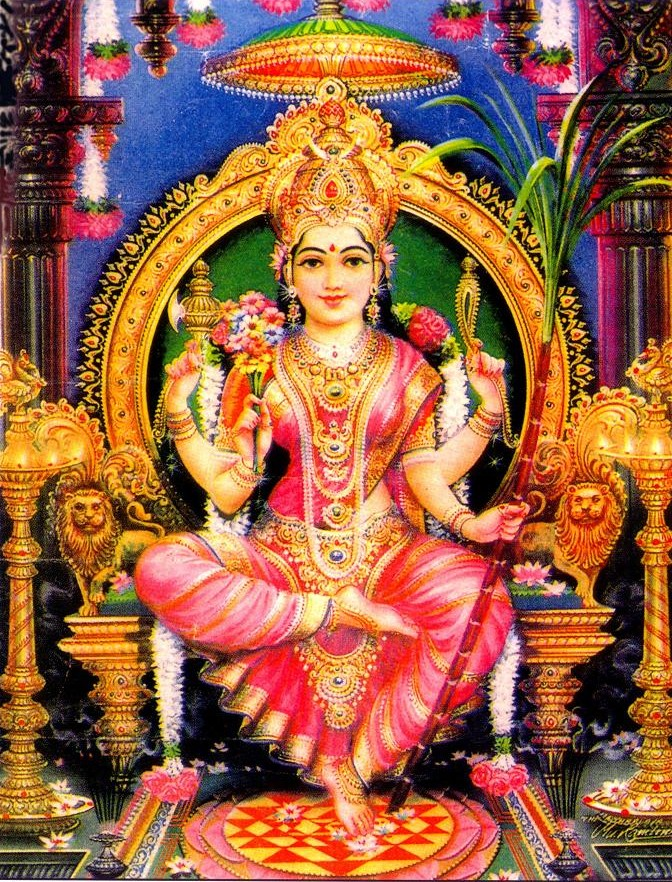
Sri Lalita-Tripurasundari (Parvati) enthroned with her left foot upon the Sri Chakra, holding her traditional symbols, the sugarcane bow, flower arrows, noose and goad.

Within the Hindu genre of Sahasranamas (literally, "thousand-name" hymns, extolling the names, deeds and associations of a given deity), the Sri Lalita Sahasranama Stotra, or "Hymn to the Thousand Names of the Auspicious Goddess Lalita", is "a veritable classic, widely acknowledged for its lucidity, clarity and poetic excellence."

The Lalita Sahasranama is part of the Brahmanda Purana, but its specific origins and authorship are lost to history. Based upon textual evidence, it is believed to have been composed in South India not earlier than the 9th or later than the 11th century CE. The text is closely associated with another section of the Brahmanda Purana entitled Lalitopakhyana ("The Great Narrative of Lalita"), which extols the deeds of the Goddess in her form as Lalita-Tripurasundari, in particular her slaying of the demon Bhandasura.

The text operates on a number of levels, containing references not just to the Devi's physical qualities and exploits but also an encoded guide to philosophy and esoteric practices of kundalini yoga and Srividya Shaktism. In addition, every name and group of names within the Sahasranama is considered to have high mantric value independent of its content, and are often prescribed in sadhanas or prayogas to accomplish particular purposes.

==== Devi Gita ====
The late Puranic age saw the beginnings of Bhakti – "new religious movements of personalistic, theistic devotionalism" that would come to full fruition between 1200 and 1700 CE, and still in many ways define the mainstream of Hindu religious practice. The Devi Gita is an important milestone, as the first major Shakta "theistic work [to be] steeped in bhakti."

The Devi Gita is the final and best-known portion of the vast 11th-century scripture known as the Devi Bhagavata Purana, a text exclusively dedicated to the Devi "in her highest iconic mode, as the supreme World-Mother Bhuvaneshvari, beyond birth, beyond marriage, beyond any possible subordination to Shiva." Indeed, the Purana's "most significant contribution to the Shakta theological tradition is the ideal of a Goddess both single and benign."

The Devi-Bhagavata Purana retells the tales of the Devi Mahatmya in much greater length and detail, embellishing them with Shakta philosophical reflections, while recasting many classic tales from other schools of Hinduism (particularly Vaishnavism) in a distinctly Shakta light:

The Devi-Bhagavata was intended not only to show the superiority of the Goddess over various male deities, but also to clarify and elaborate on her nature on her own terms. [...] The Goddess in the Devi-Bhagavata becomes less of a warrior goddess, and more a nurturer and comforter of her devotees, and a teacher of wisdom. This development in the character of the Goddess culminates in the Devi Gita, which "repeatedly stresses the necessity of love for the goddess, with no mention of one's gender, as the primary qualification," a view "inspired by the devotional ideals of Shaktism.

=== Samkhya and Vedanta ===
As the first millennium wound to an end, "religious movements of the South began to exert tremendous influence on the North" – and the Southern contribution to Shaktism's emergence was significant:

Korravai, the Tamil goddess of war and victory, was easily identified with Durga, [who] was also identified with the Bhagavati of Kerala and the eternal virgin enshrined in Kanyakumari. She was invoked in one or another of her nine forms, Navadurga, or as Bhadrakali. The Tamil tradition also associates her with Saraswati or Vāc, as also with Srī and Lakshmi. Thus in Durga the devotee visualised the triple aspects of power, beneficence and wisdom. In addition, many southern temples included shrines to the Sapta Matrika and "from the earliest period the South had a rich tradition of the cult of the village mothers, concerned with the facts of daily life.

The dualistic metaphysics of Tantric traditions indicates the influence of Samkhya on Tantra. Dasgupta speculates that the Tantric image of a wild Kali standing on a slumbering Shiva was inspired from the Samkhyan conception of Prakriti as a dynamic agent and Purusha as a passive witness. Shakta philosophy also elaborated Samkhya theory on the phases of cosmic evolution (tattvas) by expanding the number of phases from 25 to 36 tattvas. "It is worthy of note that this scheme of tattvas enables the Shakta philosophy to solve the conundrum ... as to how the changeless Brahman becomes the changing universe, and how the One can become the Many. In the Shakta cosmogony the central idea is that Shakti issues out of the Absolute and is not different from Brahman, being [rather] the kinetic aspect of Brahman."

=== Tantras ===
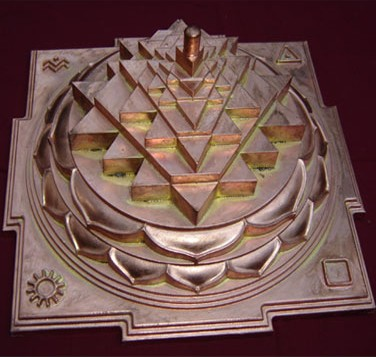
The Sri Yantra (shown here in the three-dimensional projection known as Sri Meru or Maha Meru used mainly in rituals of the Srividya Shakta sects) is central to most Tantric forms of Shaktism.

In most schools of Shaktism, the Tantras – a large genre of ritual manuals dating from as early as the 7th century CE and as late as the 19th century – are central scriptures. The Tantras "devised two main margas (paths of sadhana) to reach the same goal":

- Vamachara lineages generally favor external worship (puja, murtis, etc.) and permit use of the panchamakara (lit. "five substances", referencing certain controversial forms of worship) at various levels under controlled circumstances; and
- Dakshinachara lineages generally prefer internal worship (meditative techniques, etc.) and essentially disapprove of the panchamakara under any circumstances.

The proper path is generally determined by the guru based upon a given devotee's personal nature – i.e., as a tamasic pasu (i.e., an ordinary person not particularly given to spiritual pursuits, and mainly preoccupied with worldly matters); a rajasic vira (an active and vigorous spiritual seeker, qualified to "heroically" engage more intensive forms of sadhana); or a sattvic divya (a holy-natured person, having already achieved an extremely high level of spiritual maturity) – and various other factors.

Around 800 CE, Adi Shankara, the legendary sage and preceptor of the Advaita Vedanta system, implicitly recognized Shakta philosophy and Tantric liturgy as part of mainstream Hinduism in his powerful (and still hugely popular) hymn known as Saundaryalahari or "Waves of Beauty". Shankara, while "not a Shakta in the sectarian sense, [...] had a soft corner for Shakta religion, perhaps due to its popularity among the masses." Another important Shakta text often attributed to Shankara is the Mahishasura Mardini Stotra, a 21-verse hymn derived from the Devi Mahatmya that constitutes "one of the greatest works ever addressed to the supreme feminine power."

By the thirteenth century, "the Tantras had assimilated a very large number of cults of various origins – regional, tribal and sectarian – [and] had assumed a completely Shakta character." From the fourteenth century onward, "the Shakta-Tantric cults had [...] become woven into the texture of all the religious practices current in India," their spirit and substance infusing regional and sectarian vernacular as well as Sanskrit literature.

== Rise of popular Shaktism ==
In the 18th and 19th centuries, "a good number of Shakta-Tantric works were composed" that "attempted to make the Tantric ideas popular among the masses." Notable examples include the Mahanirvana Tantra, characterized by its "special modernism" and "liberal outlook, especially towards women." Works of the prolific and erudite Bhaskararaya, the most "outstanding contributor to Shakta philosophy," also belong to this period and remain central to Srividya practice even today.

The great Tamil composer Muthuswami Dikshitar (1775–1835), a Srividya adept, set one of that tradition's central mysteries – the majestic Navavarana Puja – to music in a Caranatic classical song cycle known as the Kamalamba Navavarna Kritis. "Dikshitar thus [threw] open the doors of [Srividya] to all those who are moved to approach the Divine Mother through devotional music." In the meantime an even greater wave of popular Shaktism was swelling in eastern India with the passionate Shakta bhakti lyrics of two Bengali-language court poets—Bharatchandra Ray (1712–1760) and Ramprasad Sen (1718/20–1781)—which "opened not only a new horizon of the Shakti cult but made it acceptable to all, irrespective of caste or creed." More than 80 Shakta poets appeared in Bengal after Ramprasad [and] by 1900 the number of Shakta lyrics exceeded 4,000. And the tradition still survives."

From this point onward, "Shaktism was evolving as a liberal, universal religion" that touched nearly every aspect of Indian life. The evolution "achieved a completeness" in the great Shakta saint Sri Ramakrishna Paramahamsa (1836–1886), "who held from his Shakta experience that the aim of all religions was the same and that the difference between the personal and the impersonal god was no more than that between ice and water."

Another major advocate of Shaktism in this period was Sir John Woodroffe (1865–1936), a High Court judge in British India and "the father of modern Tantric studies," whose vast oeuvre "bends over backward to defend the Tantras against their many critics and to prove that they represent a noble, pure, ethical system in basic accord with the Vedas and Vedanta." His complete works are still in print and remain influential to this day.

Ramakrishna's chief disciple Swami Vivekananda (1863–1902) "inherited from Ramakrishna the Shakta-oriented, synthetic outlook which insisted on the cult of Shakti in the programme of national regeneration," and in fact "regarded the country as the living image of the Divine Mother" – an image that resonated throughout India's struggle for independence.

Another of India's great nationalists, Sri Aurobindo (1872–1950), later reinterpreted "the doctrine of Shakti in a new light" by drawing on "the Tantric conception of transforming the mortal and material body into [something] pure and divine," and setting a goal of "complete and unconditional surrender to the will of the Mother."

== Modern developments ==
In certain regards, Bhattacharyya notes, Shaktism has so infused mainstream Hinduism that it has "ceased to be a sectarian religion," and presents "no difficulty for anyone to accept its essence."

Shakta-oriented temples and pilgrimage sites attract pilgrims and public attention. For example, in 2004 the Meenakshi Amman Temple was shortlisted in the "New Seven Wonders of the World" competition. The Vaishno Devi shrine in Jammu and Kashmir received approximately five million pilgrims in 2007.

The Indian film industry turns out scores of Shakta devotional films, perhaps none more famous than 1975's Jai Santoshi Maa ("Hail to the Mother of Satisfaction"), a low-budget box-office phenomenon that propelled a previously unknown deity, Santoshi Mata, to dizzying heights of devotional fervor. A 36-episode television miniseries in 2003 and a successful 2006 remake of the original film suggest that this "new" goddess's following continues to expand.

As her film brought her to life, Santoshi Ma quickly became one of the most important and widely worshiped goddesses in India, taking her place in poster-art form in the altar rooms of millions of Hindu homes. [...] Yet it is hard to conceive that Santoshi Ma could have granted such instant satisfaction to so many people had she not been part of a larger and already well-integrated culture of the Goddess. Her new devotees could immediately recognize many of her characteristic moods and attributes, and feel them deeply, because she shared them with other goddesses long since familiar to them.

Some scholars also identify a Shakta influence in the increasing visibility of Hindu female saints and gurus "through Web sites, world tours, ashrams and devotional groups across the globe, devotional publications and videos." While some of these teachers represent conservative and patriarchal lineages of mainstream Hinduism, Pechilis notes that others – for example Mata Amritanandamayi and Mother Meera – operate in a strongly "feminine mode" that is distinctly bhaktic and Shakta in nature. She observes:

Female gurus are understood by Hindu tradition and by their followers alike to be manifestations of the Goddess; that is, as perfect embodiments of shakti. [...] The nature, presence, and teaching of the Hindu female gurus is universal. As gurus, they distinctively blend the formality and authority of classical tradition with the spontaneity of interactive encounter, harmonizing personal experience and the ultimate.

== See also ==
- Shaktism
- Navadurga
- Navaratri
- Matrikas
- Mahavidya
