= Kamalambike =

Carnatic music

The Kamalamba Navavarna Kritis by Shri Muthuswami Dikshitar (1776-1836) are some of the most famous pieces of music in the Carnatic system of Indian classical music. They are treasures which embody not only the technical brilliance of the composer but also offer a peep into the advaitic school of Hindu philosophy and elements of Tantric rituals. They are very elaborate compositions which may be well compared with major symphonies in the Western system.

== Goddess Kamalamba ==
Kamalamba Navavarna Krithis is a group of compositions on Goddess Kamalamba, enshrined in the Thyagarajeshwarar Temple at Thiruvarur. She is a combined form of the trinity goddesses Saraswati, Lakshmi and Parvati. She is enshrined in a separate shrine inside the temple. She holds a distinct position, as she is depicted seated in a different posture. She is shown in deep meditation, placing her legs one above the other, in a yogic state.

== Kamalambike - Dhyana Krithi ==
This song is the invocatory song for the whole set of krithis. This song is composed in Thodi ragam and set to Rupaka thalam.

=== Pallavi ===
kamalambike Ashrita kalpalatikE chanDike kamaniyArunAm Suke karavidhruta Suke mAmava

=== Anupallavi ===
kamalAsanAdi pujita kamalapade bahuvarade kamalAlaya tirTha vaiBhave karunArnave

=== Charanam ===
sakala loka nAyikE sangIta rasikE suKhavitva pradAyikE sundari gata mAyikE vikaLEbarA mukti dAna nipuNe aGhaharanE viyadAdi Bhuta kiraNE vinOda caraNE aruNE

sakaLE guruguha karaNE sadASivanthah karaNE akacatathapadi varNE aKhanda Ika rasa purNE
