= Syama Sastri =

Indian musician (1762 – 1827)

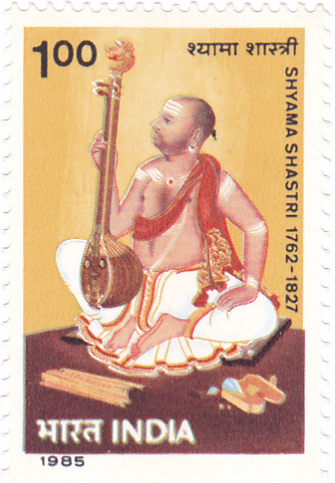
- Born: Venkata Subrahmanya Iyer; 26 April 1762; Thiruvarur, Thanjavur Maratha kingdom
- Died: 1827 (aged 64–65)
- Other name: Syama Krishna
- Occupation: Carnatic music composer

Syama Sastri (Tamil: ஷ்யாமா சாஸ்திரி; IAST: Śyāma Śāstri; 26 April 1762 – 1827) or Shyama Shastri was a musician and composer of Carnatic music. He was the eldest among the so-called Trinity of Carnatic music, Tyagaraja and Muthuswami Dikshitar being the other two.

== Early life and career ==
Syama Sastri, was born as Venkata Subrahmanya Iyer on 26 April 1762 in a Tamil speaking Smartha Vadama Brahmin family to Visvanatha Iyer and Vengalakshmi. To later generations, he is better known by his adopted name Syama Sastri or by his musical mudra (signature) Syama Krishna. He was born in Tiruvarur, in what is now the state of Tamil Nadu. He received his instruction in the vedas, astrology, and other traditional subjects early on and learned music from his maternal uncle. He was later trained in music by Adiappayya, a noted durbar musician of Thanjavur.

Although Śyāma Śastri did not compose as many kritis as his two prolific contemporaries, his compositions are still well known due to the literary, melodic and rhythmic proficiency observed in them. It is said that he composed about three hundred pieces in all.

He did not have many disciples to propagate his compositions, nor was the printing press widely accessible during his time. More importantly, the scholarly nature of his compositions made them more appealing to the learned than to the lay. Additionally, they feature a more formal form of Telugu which borrows heavily from Sanskrit. In contrast, Tyagaraja composes in generally more colloquial dialect of Telugu.

There are also a number of krithis in Tamil attributed to him. Most of his compositions propitiate the Goddess Kamakshi.

He composed kritis, varṇa(s) and svarajati(s) with the ankita or mudra (signature) Śyāma Krishna. He was probably the first to compose in a new form of the svarajati musical genre, where the compositions could be rendered solely in a singing or instrumental manner. Prior to this, the svarajati was primarily a dance form, and was close in structure to the dance Varṇaṃ (padavarṇaṃ).

His set of three famous svarajati(s) are intended to be sung in concert rather than danced, and are sometimes referred to as "Ratnatrayam" (Three jewels). They are Kāmākṣhī Anudinamu, Kāmākṣhī Padayugamē, and Rāvē himagiri kumāri, composed in the ragas Bhairavi, Yadukula kambhoji and Todi respectively. The former two are set to Miśra Cāpu Tāḷa, while the third is set to Ādi Tāḷa.

He is known for his ability to compose in the most complex of tāḷas. His trademark on his compositions was " Shyama Krishna Sahodari."

== Legacy ==
Sastri had a number of disciples who excelled at the art. Alasur Krishna Iyer became a musician at the royal durbar in Mysore. Porambur Krishna Iyer popularised many of his guru's works. Another disciple, Tarangambadi Panchanada Iyer also made his mark as a composer. Another disciple named Dasari gained fame as a noted nāgaswaram player. His son, named Subbaraya Sastri, was also a notable composer.

== Compositions ==
Some of his better known compositions are listed below.

=== Svara Jati ===
| Composition | Raga | Tāḷa | Language | Description |
|---|---|---|---|---|
| Kāmākṣhī anudinamu maruvakanē కామాక్షీ అనుదినము మరువకనే | Bhairavi | Miśra Cāpu | Telugu | |
| Kāmākṣhī nī padayugame sthiramaninē | Yadukulakamboji | Miśra Cāpu | Telugu | |
| Rāvē himagiri kumāri రావే హిమగిరి కుమారీ | Todi | Ādi | Telugu | |

=== Kriti ===
| Composition | Raga | Tāḷa | Language | Description |
|---|---|---|---|---|
| Śaṅkari Śaṃkuru candra mukhī Sanskrit: शङ्करि शंकुरु चन्द्र मुखी Telugu Script: శఙ్కరి శంకురు చన్ద్ర ముఖీ | Sāvēri | Ādi – Tiśra Gati | Sanskrit | |
| pAlayAshu mAM paradEvatE | Arabhi | Triputa | Sanskrit | |
| kanaka śaila vihāriṇī Sanskrit: कनक शैल विहारिणी Telugu Script: కనక శైల విహారిణీ | Punnāga Varāḷi | Ādi | Sanskrit | |
| Birāna varālicci brōvave బిరాన వరాలిచ్చి బ్రోవవె | Kaḷyāṇi | Ādi – Tiśra Gati | Telugu | |
| Dēvī brōva samayamide దేవీ బ్రోవ సమయము | Cintāmaṇi | Adi | Telugu | |
| kAmAkSi lOka sAkSiNi | madhyamAvati | Triputa | Sanskrit | |
| Himādri sutē pāhimāṃ హిమాద్రి సుతే పాహిమాం | Kaḷyāṇi | Ādi | Sanskrit | |
| Māyammā yani nē pilacite మాయమ్మా యని నే పిలచితె | Ahiri | Ādi | Telugu | |
| Mari vērē gati evvarammā మరి వేరే గతి ఎవరమ్మా | Anandabhairavi | Miśra Cāpu | Telugu | |
| Nannu brōvu lalitā నన్ను బ్రోవు లలితా | Lalita | Miśra Cāpu | Telugu | |
| O jagadambā nannu ఓ జగదమ్బా నన్ను | Anandabhairavi | Ādi | Telugu | |
| Pārvati ninu nē nera nammiti పార్వతీ నిను నే నెర నమ్మితి | kalkaḍa | Tishra Adi | Telugu | |
| Sarōja daḷa nētri himagiri putrī సరోజ దళ నేత్రి హిమగిరి పుత్రీ | śaṃkarābharaṇaṃ | Ādi | Telugu | |
| Tallī ninnu nera namminānu vinavē తల్లీ నిన్ను నెర నమ్మినాను వినవే | Kaḷyāṇi | Miśra Cāpu | Telugu | |
| Pāhi Srī Girirājasutē Karuṇākalitē | Anandabhairavī | Rūpakaṃ | Telugu-Sanskrit | |
| Devī Mīna Nētrī Brōva | Shankarabharanam | Adi | Telugu | |
| Ennēramum un Nāmam என்னேரமும் உன் நாமம் | Pūrvikalyāni | Misra caapu | Tamil | |
| Kamakshi Bangaru కామాక్షి బంగారు | Varali | Misra caapu | Telugu | |
| Ennēramum un Pāda Kamalam என்னேரமும் உன் பாத கமலம் | Punnāgavarāḷi | Miśra Cāpu | Tamil | |
| Sari Evaramma | Bhairavi | Khanda Jhampa | Telugu | |
| Parvathi Janani-Geetham | Bhairavi | Khanda Matya | Telugu | |
| Tarunam Idamma | Gowlipantu | Adi | Tamil | |
| Ninu vina marigalada | Reeti Gowlai | Rupakam | Telugu | |

== See also ==
- List of Carnatic composers

== Sources ==
- "Śyāma Śāstri". The Oxford Encyclopaedia of the Music of India. Oxford University Press. 2011. ISBN 9780195650983.
- Fuller, C. J.; Narasimhan, Haripriya (11 November 2014). Tamil Brahmans: The Making of a Middle-Class Caste. University of Chicago Press. ISBN 978-0-226-15288-2.
