= Kamalamba Navavarna Kritis =

Musical compositions

The Kamalamba Navavarana Kritis by Shri Muthuswami Dikshitar (1776-1836) are some of the most famous pieces of music in the Carnatic system of Indian classical music. They are treasures which embody not only the technical brilliance of the composer but also offer a peep into the advaitic school of Hindu philosophy and elements of Tantric rituals.

== Overview ==
These songs are set in praise of the Goddess Kamalamba who is enshrined in Tiruvarur in the Tanjore district of Tamil Nadu in South India. The Goddess is the reference to the Divine Mother of the universe, or the Supreme Consciousness. The lyrics and the descriptive details are loaded with the mystical symbolism of the Vedantic (advaita) tradition and the chakras of the human system are closely linked to the evolutionary aspects described in the compositions that reflect the scholarly reach, musical depth and mystical significance of the composer. Navavarna refers to the 9 layers of the Sri Chakra yantra, one of the primary modes of Devi worship. Each avarna has a deity associated with it, which is mentioned in each of the songs.

Musically, they are par excellence and the majestic sweep of well-known ragas (melodic forms) like Todi, Anandabhairavi, Kalyani, Sankarabharanam, Kambhoji, Bhairavi, Sahana and Sri are offset against haunting melodies in lesser known ragas like Punnagavarali, Ghanta and Ahiri.

Dikshitar uses several talas (time measures) although Rupakam (3 beats) seems to be his favourite. Ata talam (14 beats) and Misra Jampa (10 beats) in the Kambhoji and Bhairavi pieces are rarely used because of the technical difficulty in executing these. An added element is the use of different case endings (Sanskrit: विभक्तिः) (which Dikshitar uses in his other group krities, like the Abhayamba and Nilotpalamba set). The Dhyana (invocatory) kriti in Todi is in the vocative case, followed by the Anandabhairavi in the nominative, Kalyani in the accusative, Sankarabharanam in the instrumental, Kambhoji in the dative, Bhairavi in the ablative and so on. The ninth avarana kriti in Ahiri has all the cases; the raga itself has all the 22 Sruti (notes) in the octave. It is believed that such a fusion of all melodic and temporal elements in the same kriti is a musical way of expressing the advaitic ideal of "aham Brahmasmi" or complete union with the Absolute. Indeed, the Ahiri composition is very unusual musically especially the pallavi which has a repeating and distinctive prose sections, are seamlessly put together.

The set concludes with a short and sweet mangalam (auspicious conclusion) in Sri ragam set in Khanda Ekam (5 beat talam). The entire set consists therefore of the dhyanam (invocation), the nine avaranas, and the mangalam (conclusion), a total of 11 pieces.

== Kritis ==
The rendition of this classic cycle of compositions begin with an invocatory song on Lord Ganesha and Lord Muruga.

1. Sri Maha Ganapathiravathu mam - Goula - Misra Chapu
2. Balasubramanyam Bhajeham - Surutti - Adi.

The 11 kritis are as follows:

1. Kamalambike - Hanumatodi - Rupakam (Dhyana Krithi) - case : vocative / sambodhana
2. Kamalamba Samrakshathu - Ananda Bhairavi - Misra Chapu - case : nominative / prathamaa / kartaa
3. Kamalambaam Bhajare - Kalyani - Adi tala - case : accusative / dwiteeyaa / karma
4. Sri Kamalambikaya Katakshitoham - Shankarabharanam - Rupakam - case : instrumental / karaNa
5. Kamalambikayai - Kambhoji - (Khanda) Ata - dative / samradaana / chaturthee
6. Sri Kamalambayah param - Bhairavi - Misra Jampa - ablative / apaadaana / panchami
7. Kamalambikayaastava - Punnagavarali - Rupakam - genitive / sambandha (षष्ठी)
8. Sri Kamalambikayam - Sahana - Tisra Triputa - locative / अधिकरण (saptami)
9. Sri Kamalambike - Ghanta - Adi tala - vocative
10. Sri Kamalamba Jayati - Ahiri - Rupakam - uses all the cases
11. Sri Kamalambike - Sri - Khanda Ekam (Mangala krithi)

One of the specialities of this group set is the usage of Vibhakti or declension of the noun "Kamalamba" i.e., "कमलांबा" in 8 cases like:

कमलांबा, कमलांबां, कमलांबिकया, कमलांबिकायै, कमलांबिकायाः, कमलांबिकायाः, कमलांबिकायां, कमलांबिके.

The Dhyana krithi, krithi for the eighth chakram, and Mangala krithi use the last declension. The Ahiri krithi can be decomposed so, to detail about the use of declensions of the noun.

Pallavi: 1st vibhakthi

Anupallavi: 1st two lines - 2nd vibhakthi Next two lines (Madhyama kala sahityam) - 3rd vibhakthi

Charanam: 1st line - 4th vibhakthi 2nd line - 5th vibhakthi 3rd line - 6th vibhakthi 4th line - 7th vibhakthi Madhyama kala sahityam - 8th vibhakthi.

The rendering of these Kritis are considered to be extremely challenging owing to the complexity of the words and the notations. The D.K. Pattamal and D.K. Jayaraman school are considered to be specialists in the rendering of these compositions. It requires years of training to render them to perfection.

Sri Muthuswamy Dikshitar was a great Devi Upasaka and was well versed in all aspects of Sri Vidya Upasana. Out of his devotion to Sri Kamalamba, (one of the 64 Sakti Peethams in India), the celebrated deity at the famous Tyagaraja Temple in Tiruvarur and his compassion for all bhaktas, Sri Muthuswamy Dikshitar composed the Kamalamba Navavarana kritis, expounding in each of the nine kritis, the details of the each avarana of the Sri Chakra, including the devatas and the yoginis. Singing these kritis with devotion, sraddha and understanding would be the easy way to Sri Vidya Upasana.

== Chakras ==
The details of Chakras covered are as follows:

1. The first Avaranam is Bhoopuram and the Chakram is Trailokyamohana chakra ‘enchants the three worlds’;The yogini is Prakata, the mental state of the aspirant is Jagrata, Chakra Iswari is Tripura and the Saktis are 28 that include the ten starting with Anima, the eight starting with Brahmya and the ten Mudra Saktis. [Ragam Anandhabhairavi: Kamalamba Samrakshatu]
2. The second Avaranam is Shodasa Dalam, and the Chakram is Sarvasaparipuraka chakra, ‘fulfills all expectations’; The yogini is Gupta Yogini. The mental state is Swapna, the Chakra Iswari is Tripurasi and the Saktis are the sixteen starting with Kamakarshini. [Ragam Kalyani: Kamalambam Bhajare]
3. The third Avaranam is Ashtha Dalam; The Chakram is Sarvasamkshobana chakra, ‘agitates all’; the Yogini is Gupta Tara Yogini. The mental state is Sushupti, the Chakra Iswari is Tripura Sundari and the Saktis are the eight starting with Ananga Kusuma. [Ragam Sankarabharanam: Sri Kamalambikayaa Katakshitoham]
4. The fourth Avaranam is Chaturdasaram; the Chakram is Sarvasaubhagyadayaka chakra, ‘grants excellence’; the Yogini is Sampradaya Yogini. The mental state is Iswara Vicharam, Chakra Iswari is Tripura Vasini and the Saktis are the fourteen starting with Samkshobhini. [Ragam Kambhoji: Kamalambikaayai Kanakamshukayai]
5. The fifth Avaranam is Bahirdasaram; the Chakram is Sarvarthasadhakachakra, is the ‘accomplisher of all’; the Yogini is Kulotteerna yogini. The mental state is Guroopa Sadanam; the Chakra Iswari is Tripura Sri and the Saktis are the ten starting with Sarva Siddhi Prada. [Ragam Bhairavi: Sri Kamalambikayaha Param Nahi re re chitta]
6. The sixth Avaranam is Antardasaram; the Chakram is Sarvaraksakara chakra, ‘protects all’; the Yogini is Nigarbha Yogini. The mental state is Upadesam; the Chakra Iswari is Tripura Malini and the Saktis are the ten starting with Sarvagnya. [Ragam Punnagavarali: Kamalambikayastava Bhaktoham]
7. The Seventh Avaranam is Asthakonam; the Chakram is Sarvarogahara chakra, ‘cures all ills’; the Yogini is Rahasya Yogini. The mental state is Mananam; the chakra Iswari is Tripura Siddhaa and the Saktis are the eight, starting with Vashini. [Ragam Sahana: Sri Kamalambikayam Bhaktim Karomi]
8. The eighth Avaranam is Trikonam; the Chakram is Sarvasiddhiprada chakra, ‘grants all perfection’; the Yogini is Ati Rahasya Yogini. The mental state is Nitidhyasanam; the Chakra Iswari is Tripuramba and the Saktis are the three starting with Kameshwari. [Ragam Ghanta: Sri Kamalambike Avaava]
9. The ninth Avaranam is the Bindu and the highest Chakram is Sarvanandamaya chakra, ‘replete with bliss’. The mental state is Savikalpa Samadhi; the Chakra Iswari is Maha Tripura Sundari and the Shakti is Maha Tripura Sundari, the very personification of Para Brahman. [Ragam Ahiri: Sri Kamalamba Jayati]
