= Trinity of Carnatic music =

Three composers in 18th-century India

The Trinity of Carnatic Music, also known as the Three Jewels of Carnatic Music, or as the Tiruvarur Trinity, refers to the outstanding trio of composer-musicians of Carnatic music in the late 18th to early 19th centuries—Tyagaraja, Muthuswami Dikshitar, and Syama Sastri. Prolific in composition, the trio is known for creating a new era of Carnatic music by bringing about a noticeable change in the existing Carnatic music tradition. Their compositions are recognized as being distinct in style, and original in handling ragas. All three composers were born in Thiruvarur, a town located in the erstwhile Tanjore region, and formerly part of the Thanjavur District in Tamilnadu. M. S. Subbalakshmi, D. K. Pattammal, and M. L. Vasanthakumari, who are carnatic musicians of the 20th century, are popularly referred to as the female Trinity of Carnatic Music.

Name	Years	Language of Compositions	Mudra	Known for
Syama Sastri	1762–1827	Telugu and Sanskrit	Śyāma Krishna	Complex Talas, Swarajati
Tyagaraja	1767–1847	Telugu and Sanskrit	Tyagaraja	Pancharatna Kritis
Muthuswami Dikshitar	1775–1835	Sanskrit; Some in Manipravalam	Guruguha	Nottuswara, Navagraha Kritis

== Compositions ==
Muthuswami Dikshitar mainly composed mainly in Sanskrit and some in Manipravalam, while Tyagaraja and Syama Sastri mainly composed in Telugu and Sanskrit.

=== Ragas and talas ===
The Trinity of Carnatic music composed new ragas and talas, and had a remarkable ability to introduce innovations within the same raga.

Compositions of Syama Sastri in 'apoorva' ragas like Chinthamani, and Kalagada evidence his originality and genius in discovering new forms in Carnatic music. The creative ability of Syama Sastri is possibly best exampled in his concert-contest against Kesavvaya, a great Carnatic musician from Bobbili. During this contest which took place at the court of the king of Thanjavur, although Kesavayya sang a rare raga followed by a tana in different jathis and gathis, Syama Sastri reproduced similar tana varieties, and to the delight of the audience, went further to introduce other varieties which were not known to Kesavvaya.

== See also ==
- List of Carnatic composers
- List of composers who created ragas
- List of Carnatic instrumentalists
- The Tamil Trinity
