= Kambhoji =

Janya raga of Carnatic music

Kambhoji or Kambodhi is a popular Raga in Carnatic Music. It is classified as a derived raga from 28th Melakartha, Harikambhoji, and has existed since the 7th century.

== Medieval era ==
There are numerous references to Raga or Ragini called Kambhoji in ancient Indian musical traditions. Narada's Sangita Makaranda (7th to 8th century AD) broadly classifies Ragas into eight subsets and includes three raginis in each subset. In this scheme of classification, Narada accepts raga Kambhoji as a mode of Shri raga, the first subset of his scheme of classification. Ramaditya, the author of Swara-Mela Kalanidhi (1550 AD) has accepted 20 melas and has accommodated 64 Jana-ragas among the melas. In this scheme of classification, the twentieth mela is Kambhoji under which come the Jana-ragas like Kambhoji. Ragamala of Pundrikavitthala classifies ragas into six divisions with each group having several raginis and ragas imagined to be their spouses and sons. Thus the ragini Kambhoji is assumed to be one among the several spouses of raga Nat-Narayana. Chatravarishach.chhat-Raga Nirupanam authored by Narada (1525-50 AD) lists ten main ragas and accepts the Kambhoji as the spouse of seventh raga called Raga Nata-Narayana. Chaturdandi Prakashika authored by Venkatamakhin (also known as Venkateshwara Dikshit, ~1660 AD) assumes 19 melas and lists the Kambhoji, Kedaragaula and Narayanagaula as the Janya ragas under mela Kambhoji. The Anupa-Sangit-Ratanakar by Sangit Acharya Bhava-Bhata lists 20 ragas as being fundamental ragas. The third raga of his scheme, called Kedar Raga, includes more than a dozen of raginis—the seventh being the well known Kambhoji. Raja Tulaji, the ruler of Tanjore (1763–1787 AD) has written a well known book on musicology known as Sangit-Saramritoddhar. Raja Tulaji assumes 21 Janakmelas and includes Kambhoji and Yadukul-Kambhoji as the Jana ragas under the eighth Janaka-mela of his scheme of classification.

== References by Matanga ==
Most of the references above are comparatively recent but this should not be taken to mean that raga Kambhoji is also of recent origin. Reference to this raga as Thakkesi is in the ancient Tamil epic Cilappatikaram which is referred by the Sanskrit name kamboji. Brihaddesi authored by Sangit Acharya Matanga Muni (500–700 AD) is the most important work between Natyashastra (2nd century BC) and Sangita Makarand (7th to 8th century AD). Sage Matanga probably hailed from south India. This Brihaddesi work is dated between 5th and 7th century AD but it is incomplete. Portions of it appear to have lost down the road. Matanga's Brihaddeshi is the first major and available text to describe the Ragas as we understand them today. Sangit Acharya Matanga informs us that "a classical melody (Raga) can not be composed of four notes or less. But the melodies used by the tribes such as the Sabara, Pulinda, Kamboja, Vanga, Kirata, Vahlika, Andhra, Dravida and the Vanachra (forest dwelling) clans or tribes are an exception which contain four svaras or notes".
