= Navagraha Kritis =

Songs to the 9 planets (vedic astrology)

The Navagraha Kritis are a set of nine songs composed by Muttuswāmi Dīkshitar, a great composer of Carnātic Music (Classical music of South India). Each song is a prayer to one of the nine Navagrahās ("planets" of Hindu mythology). The songs titles, rāga (musical scale) and tāḷa (rhythmic pattern) are listed below:

- Sūryamūrtē Namōstutē (on Sun or Surya, in Rāga Saurāṣhṭram, Tāḷa Chatusra Dhrūva)
- Candram Bhaja Mānasa (on Moon or Chandra, in Rāga Asāvēri, Tāḷa Chatusra Maṭya)
- Angārakam Āśrayāmyaham (on Mars or Angāraka, in Rāga Suraṭi, Tāḷa Rūpaka)
- Budham Āśrayāmi (on Mercury or Budha, in Rāga Nāṭakuranji, Tāḷa Misra Jhampa)
- Bṛhaspatē Tārāpatē (on Jupiter or Bṛhaspati, in Rāga Aṭhānā, Tāḷa Tisra Tripuṭa)
- Śrī Śukra Bhagavantam (on Venus or Shukra, in Rāga Paraju, Tāḷa Khanda Aṭa)
- Divākaratanujam Śanaiṣcaram (on Saturn or Shani, in Rāga Yadukulakāmbhōji, Tāḷa Chatusra Ēka)
- Smarāmyaham Sadā Rāhum (on Rāhu, in Rāga Rāmapriya (Rāmamanōhari), Tāḷa Rūpaka)
- Mahāsuram Kētumaham (on Kētu, in Rāga Shanmukhapriya (Chāmaram), Tāḷa Rūpaka)

The set comprises all seven soolādi tāḷas.

The last two (on Rāhu and Kētu) were most likely composed by followers of Dīkshitar, to complete the set of nine even though the signature used in the song is that of Dikshitar (guruguha).

Legend:

It is said that Tambiappan, a disciple of Muttuswāmi Dīkshitar was suffering from a stomach ailment and for long no medicines were able to cure him. Dīkshitar inspecting his horoscope inferred that the planet Jupiter was in an unfavorable position and his ailment could be cured only by propitiating the planet god Bṛhaspati. As laymen would find these rituals complex he created the composition Bṛhaspatē in the Rāga Aṭhānā propitiating the planet, and asked his disciple to sing it for a week. As ordained, his ailment was cured. This incident provided the impetus for Dīkshitar to compose kritis on all the Navagrahās.
