= Muthuswami Dikshitar =

Indian composer (1776–1835)

Muthuswami Dikshitar (Mudduswamy Dikshitar)
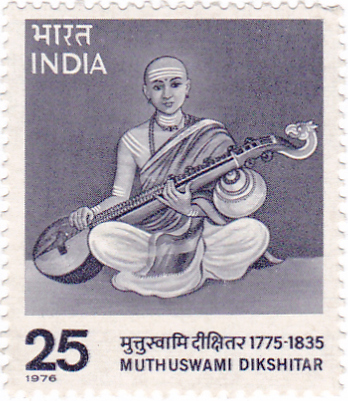
- Born: 24 March 1776; Thiruvarur, near Thanjavur, Tamil Nadu
- Died: 21 October 1835 (aged 59); Ettayapuram, India
- Other name: Guruguha
- Occupations: Carnatic music composer, Vainika
- Father: Ramaswami Dikshitar

Muthuswami Dikshitar Memorial, Ettayapuram

Muthuswami Dikshitar (24 March 1776–21 October 1835; IAST: muttusvāmi dīkṣitar; also known as Mudduswamy Dikshitar and, mononymously, as Dikshitar, and sometimes Guruguha), (Note: The -r suffix is a Tamil honorific.) was a South Indian Hindu poet, singer, veena player, and prolific composer of Indian classical music. He was the youngest member of the Trinity of Carnatic music, alongside Tyagaraja (1767–1847), and Syama Sastri (1762–1827).

Dikshitar is credited with around 500 compositions, widely recognised for their elaborate poetic descriptions of Hindu deities and detailed architectural depictions of temples. Continuing to be widely performed in Carnatic music concerts, his music is notable for capturing the essence of ragas in the vainika (veena) style, which highlights the use of gamakas. His works are usually composed in a slower tempo (chowka kala), often incorporating middle tempo stanzas (madhyama kala sahitya).

Unlike the predominantly Telugu compositions of his Carnatic contemporaries Tyagaraja and Syama Sastri, Dikshitar's works are mostly in Sanskrit. He also composed a few kritis in Manipravalam, a literary style combining Sanskrit and Tamil.

== Family and name ==
Dikshitar was born into an Auttara Vadama Tamil Brahmin family on 24 March 1776 in Tiruvarur near Thanjavur, in what is now the state of Tamil Nadu, India, but his family traditionally traced their lineage to Virinchipuram in the northern part of the state. His father Ramaswami Dikshitar (born c. 1735), was from an Auttara Vadama family in Virinchipuram and relocated south due to the politically turbulent environment surrounding the Kanchipuram and Virinchipuram region. Dikshitar had two brothers, Chinnaswami (Cinnasvāmi; 1778–c. 1823) and Balaswami (Bālāsvāmi; 1786–1858), (Note: He is also named Baluswami in some sources.) and a sister, Balāmba.

Dikshitar used the signature name "Guruguha" as a mudra in all his compositions, but his name is generally styled Muthuswami Dikshitar, with Muthu meaning "pearl" in Tamil, cognate to Mutya in Sanskrit. The name Muthuswami can also be linked to a deity of the Vaitheeswaran Koil in Mayiladuthurai named Selvamuthukumaraswamy, and in the 1904 Telugu publication of Sangita Sampradaya Pradarshini, Sri Subbarama Dikshitar refers to Dikshitar as Muthuswami. However, in Compositions of Muthuswami Dikshitar T. K. Govinda Rao explains that "Muddayya" is an epithet of Kumaraswami or Guha, and in Dikshitar's composition Bhajare re Chitha in Kalyani (raga), the mudra appears as "Guruguha Roopa Muddu Kumara Jananeem".

== Education ==
Dikshatar was educated by his father Ramaswami Dikshitar in several subjects including the Vedas, poetry, music, and astronomy. Ramaswami had trained in the veena under Venkata Vaidyanatha Dikshitar, of the lineage of Govinda Dikshitar and Venkatamakhin, an influence reflected in Muthuswami's works, which follow the Venkatamakhin raga system.

Dikshatar later moved to Manali, near Madras (now Chennai), with the support of Venkatakrishna Mudaliar, a local zamindar. He and his brothers accompanied the zamindar to Fort St. George where they were introduced to Western orchestral music and the violin. An ascetic named Chidambaranatha Yogi then took Dikshatar under his wing, and they went to Benares (now Varanasi, in Uttar Pradesh). There he was instructed in music, esotericism, philosophy, and yoga. He was also exposed to Hindustani classical music, particularly the Dhrupad style, which some scholars believe influenced his later compositions. (Note: Those holding this view list works such as Rangapura vihāra and Śri saundara rājam (both in Vrindāvani Sārang), Śri Satyanārāyaṇam and Paśupatīśwaram (Śubha Pantuvarāḷi), Jamboopaté pāhimām (Yamuna Kalyāṇi), etc., in support of their position.)

According to hagiographical tradition, Murugan, the deity of the temple at Tiruttani is said to have placed a piece of sugar candy in Dikshitar's mouth and commanded him to sing. This marked the beginning of his music career and also led him to adopt the mudra "Guruguha", one of the many names of Murugan.

== Career ==
Dikshatar's first composition was "Śrināthādi guruguho jayati jayati" in the raga Maya Malavagaula and Adi tala. This song addressed the Lord (and/or the guru) in the first declension (Vibhakthi) in Sanskrit. Dikshitar later composed Kritis in all eight declensions on the Lord, glorifying Muruga in the ascetic form and having few references to the deity in the saguna form, as at Thiruthani.

Throughout his early life, Dikshitar travelled to numerous sacred temples across India, composing Kritis in honour of the deities enshrined at these sites. Many of his works praise the presiding deities of temples and incorporate references to specific characteristics and traditions of each site. Among the sites he composed at before returning to his home town of Tiruvarur were temples in Varanasi, Tirupati, Srirangam, Chidambaram, Kanchipuram, Thanjavur, Palani, Tiruvannamalai, Kalahasthi, and Srirangam.

Back in Tiruvarur he composed on every deity in the Thyagaraja Temple there, including the presiding deity Tyagaraja (a form of Lord Shiva), his consort Nilotpalambal, and the goddess Kamalambal, an independent deity of high tantric significance in the same temple complex. This is when he composed the famous Kamalamba Navavarna Kritis, filled with exemplary sahityas on the deities of the Sri Chakra. These navavarnams were in all eight declensions of the Sanskrit language and are sung as a highlight of Guruguha Jayanti, celebrated every year.

Dikshatar continued to display his prowess by composing the Navagraha Kritis in praise of the nine planets, with the sahitya of the songs reflecting a profound knowledge of the Mantra and Jyotisha sastras. The Nilotpalamba Kritis is another classic set of compositions that revived dying ragas like Narayanagaula, Purvagaula, and Chayagaula. He also attained proficiency in the veena, and the influence of veena playing is evident in his compositions, particularly the gamakas. In his Kriti Balagopala, he introduces himself as a vainika gāyaka, "a player of the veena". He experimented with the violin, as did his disciple Vadivelu of the Thanjavur Quartet, and his brother Balaswami pioneered the use of the violin in Carnatic music, making it now an integral part of most Carnatic ensembles.

== Death and legacy ==
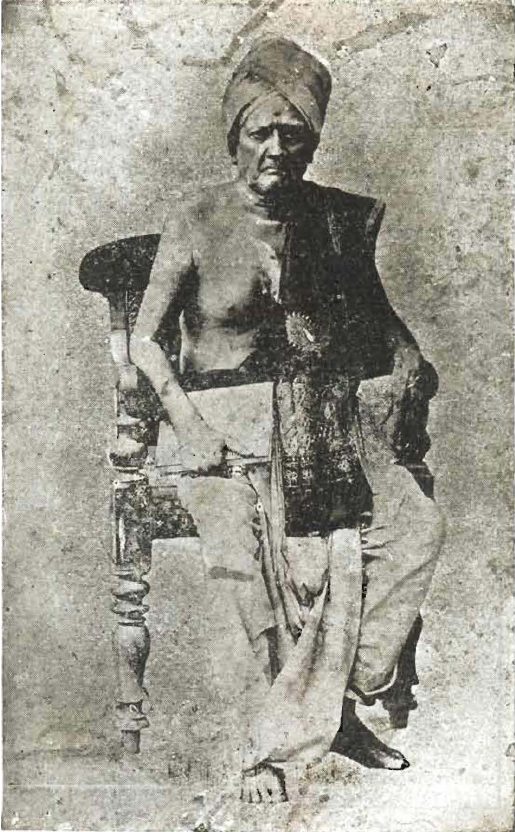
Subbarama Dikshitar (1839–1906), was a musician and a grandson of Muthuswami's brother Balaswami

Dikshitar died on 21 October 1835 (Deepavali) in Ettayapuram, where a samadhi was erected in his memory, attracting musicians and admirers of his art. Dikshitar had no children, but his disciples included several artists who carried forward his tradition, including the Tanjore quartet brothers, Ponnayya Pillai, Vadivelu, Chinnayya, and Sivanandam; the mridangam player Tambiyappa; the veena player Venkatarama Ayyar of Avudayarkoil; Tiruvarur Kamalam; Vallalarkoil Ammani; Kornad Ramaswamy; Tirukkadeyur Bharati; Thevvoor Subrahmania Ayyar; and the son of Shyama Sastri, Subbaraya Sastri.

His brothers Chinnaswami and Balaswami were also noted musicians. Chinnaswami composed some Kritis, while Balaswami adapted and pioneered the use of the Western violin in Carnatic music. The two of them were primarily vocalists and performed together as a duo singing their brother's compositions. Balaswami's grandson (Note: Sources differ on their exact relationship. Balaswami is stated to have adopted Subbarama as his son. He is also named as his grandson, presumably due to the difference in their ages.) was the composer and scholar, Subbarama Dikshitar (1839–1906). In his Sangeeta Sampradaya Pradarshini (IAST: Saṅgīta sampradāya pradarśini), Subbarama recorded 229 of Muthuswami Dikshitar's Kritis.

Dikshitar is considered one of the Trinity of Carnatic music alongside his two contemporaries from Tiruvarur, Tyagaraja and Shyama Sastri. The Carnatic musician M Balamuralikrishna composed a song in his honor in the Raga Sucharitra, 'Cintayāmi Satatam Śrī Mudduswāmi Dīkṣitam'. Within the Raga Devamanohari, fellow Carnatic musician Koteeswara Iyer also composed the song 'Sāmi Dīkṣita' to honor Dikshitar.

== Compositions ==
Dikshitar is credited with composing around 500 works, mostly in Sanskrit and following the Kriti format. Overall, his compositions encompass a uniquely wide range of deities, broader than that found in the works of most composers in the Carnatic tradition. His works are noted for their depth, melodic sophistication, and structural precision, and his interpretations of several rāgas are regarded as authoritative references for their melodic form. While his lyrics are primarily devotional, addressed to specific temple deities, they also integrate concepts from Advaita Vedanta, with the Navagraha kritis also making references to Hindu astrology.

=== Technical contributions ===
Dikshitar composed Kritis in all 72 Melakarta ragas under his unique Asampurna Mela scheme, thereby preserving and showcasing several rare and nearly forgotten ragas. He is also credited with pioneering the Samashti Charanam format, compositions that include only one stanza after the Pallavi instead of the conventional two.

Dikshitar was also a master of Tala and is the only recorded composer to have Krithis in all seven basic Talas of the Carnatic scheme. His compositions are known for proficient alliteration (prāsa) and intricate use of Sanskrit grammar, including the use of all eight grammatical declensions.

=== Grouped compositions and notable works ===
Dikshitar composed many kritis in groups. Prominent among these are the Navagraha kritis, Abhayāmbā Vibhakti kritis, Kamalāmbā Navāvarana kritis, Guruguha Vibhakti kritis and Pancabhūta sthala kritis, withVatapi Ganapatim considered his best-known work.

Shri Nilotpala Nayike, in the raga Reethigowlai. A composition by Muthuswamy Dikshitar. The rendition was part of the Smt Kalpakam Swaminathan memorial concert at Naada Inbam, Chennai.

He is also said to have composed a Rama Ashtapadi along with Upanishad Brahmendral at Kanchipuram, which has been lost.

=== Influence of Western music ===
Dikshitar was exposed to the music of Western bands at a young age in Fort St. George. Later, he composed forty songs by loosely adapting several western folk tunes to ragas such as Shankarabharanam, a corpus now known as nottusvara sahitya (etym. nottusvara = "notes" swara). The influence of Celtic and Baroque styles in these compositions is evident, for example with Sakthi Sahitha Ganapatim, drawing on the tune of "Voulez-vous Dancer". A common misconception is that these compositions were commissioned by C.P. Brown, the Collector of Cuddappah. However, this is improbable as historical records indicate that Dikshitar had left Madras by 1799, while Brown did not arrive there until 3 August 1817, where he studied at the Fort St. George College.

== See also ==
- List of Carnatic composers

== Sources ==
- "Muthuswāmi Dīkshitar". The Oxford Encyclopaedia of the Music of India. Oxford University Press. 2011. ISBN 9780195650983.
- "Dīkshitar Musical Family". The Oxford Encyclopaedia of the Music of India. Oxford University Press. 2011. ISBN 9780195650983.
- "Chinnaswāmi Dīkshitar". The Oxford Encyclopaedia of the Music of India. Oxford University Press. 2011. ISBN 9780195650983.
- "Bālāswāmi Dīkshitar". The Oxford Encyclopaedia of the Music of India. Oxford University Press. 2011. ISBN 9780195650983.
- "Sangeeta Sampradāya Pradarśini". The Oxford Encyclopaedia of the Music of India. Oxford University Press. 2011. ISBN 9780195650983.
- Pesch, Ludwig (2006). Wolpert, Stanley (ed.). Encyclopedia of India. Charles Scribner's Sons. ISBN 9780684313498.
- Peterson, Indira V. (1986). "Sanskrit in Carnatic Music: The Songs of Muttusvāmi Dīkṣita". Indo-Iranian Journal. 29 (3): 183–199. JSTOR 24654620.
- Ramaswamy, Vijaya (2007). Historical dictionary of the Tamils. Lanham, Md.: Scarecrow Press. ISBN 9780810864450.
