= Thiruvarur =

Thiruvarur Tiruvarur
- Municipality
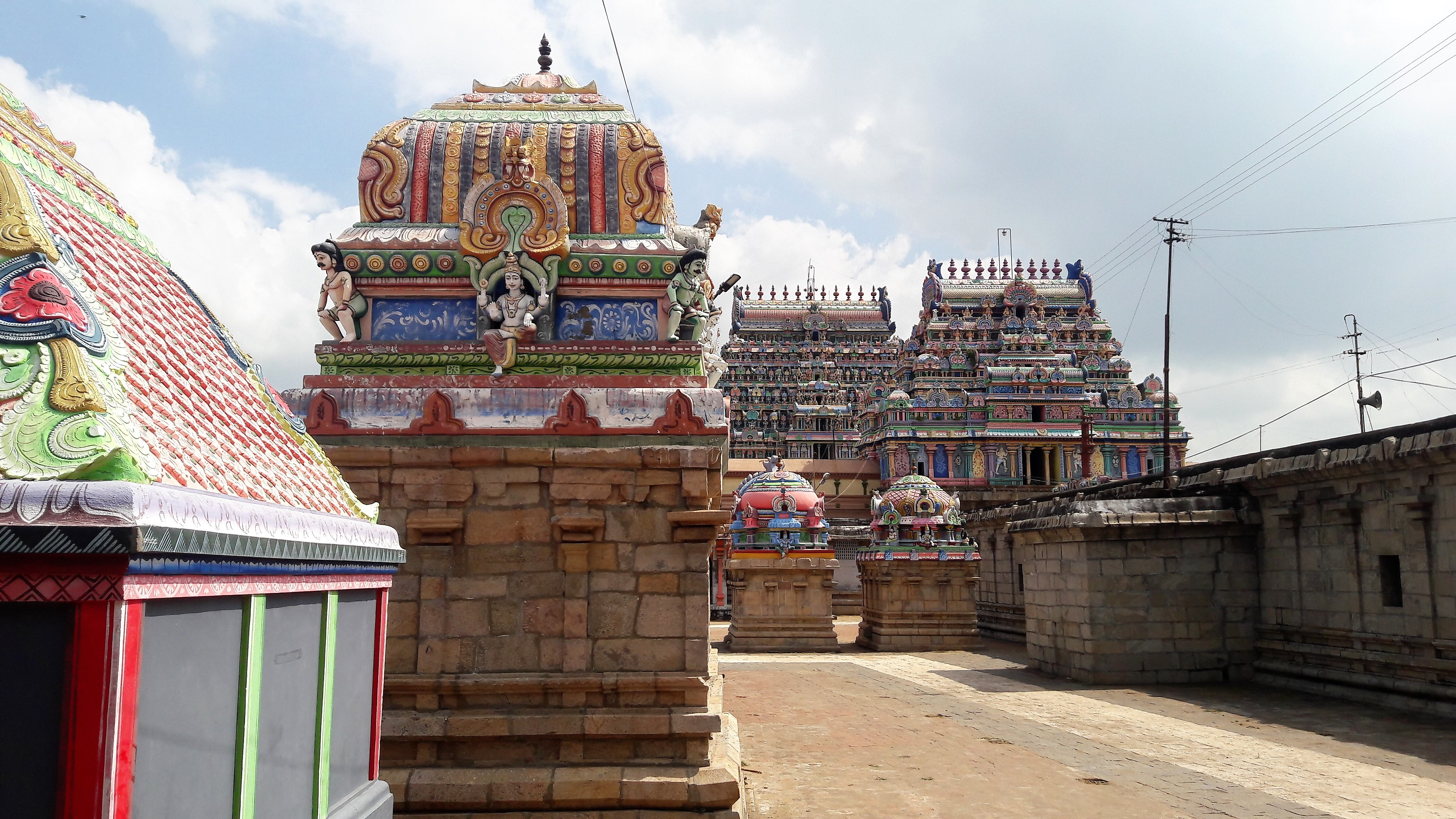
- The Thyagarajasvami temple, at the heart of Thiruvarur, is a significant Shaivite sanctuary.

- Location in Tamil Nadu, India
- Coordinates: 10°46′24.785″N 79°38′11.882″E
- Country: India
- State: Tamil Nadu
- District: Thiruvarur
- Region: Cauvery Delta

Government
  - Type: Selection Grade Municipality
  - Body: Thiruvarur Municipality

Area
  - Total: 10.47 km^{2} (4.04 sq mi)
- Elevation: 3 m (9.8 ft)

Population (2011)
  - Total: 58,301
  - Density: 5,568/km^{2} (14,420/sq mi)

Languages
  - Official: Tamil
- Time zone: UTC+5:30 (IST)
- PIN: 610001
- Telephone code: 914366
- Vehicle registration: TN:50
- Website: www.thiruvarur.in

Thiruvarur (Tamil: [t̪iɾuʋaːɾuːɾ]) also spelt as Tiruvarur is a Municipality in the Indian state of Tamil Nadu. It is the administrative headquarters of Thiruvarur district and Thiruvarur taluk.

Thiruvarur was a part of Thanjavur district until 1991. The Odambokki river passes through the centre of the town. Thiruvarur covers an area of 10.47 km^{2} (4.04 sq mi) and had a population of 58,301 as of 2011. Out of total population of Tiruvarur, 1,403,348 in the district, 257,795 are in urban area and 1,006,482 are in rural area. 65,220 households are in urban, 261,999 are in rural area. It is administered by a selection grade municipality. The town is a part of the Cauvery delta and the erstwhile Tanjore region, agriculture being the major occupation of the area. Roadways are the major means of transportation with a total of 94.06 km (58.45 mi) of district roads including three national highways passing through the town. The town was one of the five traditional capitals of the Chola empire, with one of the emperors of the dynasty, Kulothunga Chola I, having it as his capital. The town is believed to be of significant antiquity and has been ruled, at different times, by the Medieval Cholas, Later Cholas, Later Pandyas, Vijayanagar Empire, Thanjavur Nayaks, Marathas and the British. The town is known for the Thyagaraja temple, and the largest annual chariot festival in Asia, held in the month of April. The temple chariot of the Thyagaraja temple, weighing 360 tonnes (790,000 lb) and measuring 96 feet (29 m) tall is the largest temple chariot in India. Thiruvarur is the birthplace of Tyagaraja, Muthuswami Dikshitar and Syama Sastri, popularly known as the Trinity of Carnatic music of the 18th century CE.

== Etymology ==
The historic name of the town was Aaroor (Arur) and it finds mention in the seventh century saiva canonical work, Tevaram. It was also called Śrīnagara in Sanskrit.

The term Thiru is added to all temple cities that are mostly revered by the verses of Tevaram, which is the case of Arur becoming Thiruvarur. Another name of Thiruvarur is Kamalaalayasetra, meaning the "holy place that is an abode of lotuses"; the town is also referred so due to the presence of the Kamalaalayam tank and the temple deity, Kamalambigai. During the British Raj, the town was termed Tiruvalur, Tiruvaloor, and Thiruvalur. As per the district and municipality websites, the district has the spelling "Tiruvarur", while the town has it as "Thiruvarur".

== History ==
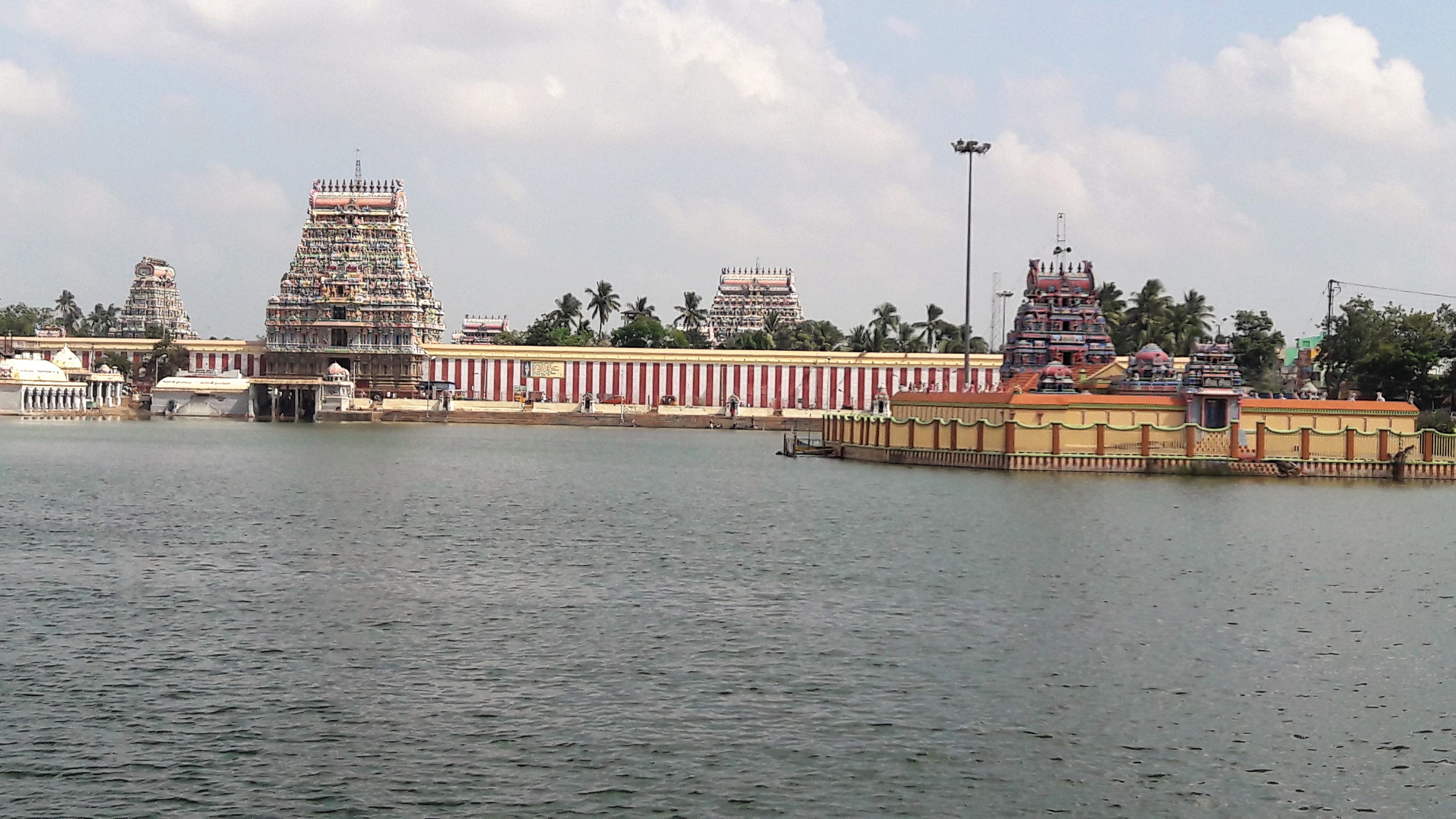
Thyagaraja Temple – an important landmark of the town and one of the largest temples in Tamil Nadu

As per folk legend, Thiruvarur is mentioned as the capital town of a legendary Chola king, Manu Needhi Cholan, who killed his own son to provide justice to a cow.

Thiruvarur was one of the five traditional capitals of the Chola empire and the history of town revolves around the Thyagarajaswamy Temple. Thiruvarur is mentioned in the saiva canonical work, Tevaram by Thirugnana Sambanthar, Tirunavukkarasar and Sundarar, the foremost Saivite saints of seventh–eighth century CE and classified as Padal petra stalam. Tirunavukkarasar mentions several traditions of the temple like Marghazhi Aathirai Vizha, Panguni Uttirai Perunaal and Veedhivitakanin Veedhi Panni. The granite structure of the temple was first constructed by Aditya Chola I (871–907 CE) in the ninth century CE and revamped during the reign of Rajaraja Chola I (985–1014 CE). The temple was upgraded and rebuilt with stone by Rajendra Chola I (1012–44 CE). The temple has inscriptions from both the emperors, later Cholas and Pandyas. The temple is believed to be an inspiration for Rajaraja Chola to build the Brihadeeswarar Temple, a UNESCO World Heritage Site.

Inscriptions from the temple indicate Thiruvarur as the capital of Kulothunga Chola I (1070–1120 CE), during which the town emerged a centre of saivism. After the fall of Cholas during the reign of Rajendra Chola III in the 13th century CE, the town was caught under a power struggle between the Pandyas and Hoysalas. The royal patronage continued and the town flourished as a cultural centre during the rule of the Nayaks, Vijayanagar kings and Marathas. During the period of Marathas, the town became a temporary home to the Nataraja of Chidambaram temple. The town was briefly captured by French troops led by Lally (1702–66 CE) in 1759 CE. The Thyagarajar temple was ransacked in a failed attempt to discover hidden treasure. During the attempt, six members of the temple, suspected to be spies of the British, were killed in an encounter. The province and Tanjore were annexed by British after the failed attempt of the French to attack the King of Tanjore. After independence, Thiruvaur continued to be a part of the Thanjavur district and Nagapattinam district until 1991 and 1997 respectively. Thiruvarur was made the headquarters of Tiruvarur district when it was carved out of Nagapattinam district in 1997. In modern days, Thiruvarur regarded as the origin of Carnatic music because of the birth of great three musicians of Carnatic music (Tyagaraja, Muthuswami Dikshitar and Syama Sastri - The trinity of Carnatic Music).

== Geography ==
Thiruvarur is located at 9.28°N 79.3°E. The town is bounded by Sukumar river in the north, Valaiyar river in the south while the Odambokki river flows through the centre. The town has an average elevation of 3 metres (9.8 ft) from the sea level. The municipality covers an area of 10.47 km^{2} (4.04 sq mi) Thiruvarur is situated at a distance of 300 km from Chennai, 24 km (15 mi) from Nagapattinam, 40 km (25 mi) from Karaikal, 40 km (25 mi) from Mayiladuthurai and 56 km (35 mi) from Thanjavur. The town along with the district receives an annual rainfall of 1,260 millimetres (50 in). The town experiences tropical climate during summer; from March to May. The proximity to sea results in high humidity throughout the year and peaks 70% from August to May. The town has a plain terrain of alluvial soil consisting of sand, silt and clay. Vennar and Vettar, the tributaries of river Cauvery are the major water bodies around the town. Surface water canals contribute 89% to irrigation, while the rest 11% is accounted by dug wells and tube wells. Paddy is the major crop while the others being black gram, green gram, ground nut and gingely.

Climate data for Thiruvarur, India
Month	Jan	Feb	Mar	Apr	May	Jun	Jul	Aug	Sep	Oct	Nov	Dec	Year
Mean daily maximum °C (°F)	28.4 (83.1)	29.4 (84.9)	31.3 (88.3)	33.3 (91.9)	36.1 (97.0)	36.8 (98.2)	35.9 (96.6)	35.1 (95.2)	33.9 (93.0)	31.7 (89.1)	29.7 (85.5)	28.6 (83.5)	32.5 (90.5)
Mean daily minimum °C (°F)	22.5 (72.5)	23.3 (73.9)	24.7 (76.5)	26.9 (80.4)	27.5 (81.5)	27.1 (80.8)	26.4 (79.5)	26.0 (78.8)	25.6 (78.1)	25.1 (77.2)	24.1 (75.4)	23.0 (73.4)	25.2 (77.4)
Average precipitation mm (inches)	29.9 (1.18)	16.4 (0.65)	20.1 (0.79)	23.1 (0.91)	41.9 (1.65)	49.3 (1.94)	63.1 (2.48)	79.7 (3.14)	96.5 (3.80)	249.2 (9.81)	549.5 (21.63)	593.3 (23.36)	1,403.9 (55.27)

== Demographics ==
Historical population
Year	Pop.	±%
1971	35,858	—
1981	43,654	+21.7%
1991	49,194	+12.7%
2001	56,341	+14.5%
2011	58,301	+3.5%
Sources: 1971 – 2011:

Religious census
Religion	Percent(%)
Hindu	84.38%
Muslim	14.13%
Christian	1.39%
Sikh	0.02%
Buddhist	0.01%
Jain	0.02%
Other	0.05%
No religion	0.01%

During 1901, the population of the town stood at 15,436. According to 2011 census, Thiruvarur had a population of 58,301 with a sex-ratio of 1,053 females for every 1,000 males, much above the national average of 929. A total of 5,779 were under the age of six, constituting 2,888 males and 2,891 females. Scheduled Castes and Scheduled Tribes accounted for 32% and .66% of the population respectively. The average literacy of the town was 82.%, compared to the national average of 72.99%. The town had a total of 14997 households. There were a total of 18,953 workers, comprising 672 cultivators, 960 main agricultural labourers, 318 in house hold industries, 15,596 other workers, 1,407 marginal workers, 47 marginal cultivators, 261 marginal agricultural labourers, 52 marginal workers in household industries and 1,047 other marginal workers.

As per the religious census of 2011, Thiruvarur had 84.38% Hindus, 14.13% Muslims, 1.39% Christians, 0.02% Sikhs, 0.01% Buddhists, 0.02% Jains, 0.05% following other religions and 0.01% following no religion or did not indicate any religious preference.

The population growth rate was higher during the decade of 1981–90 due to increased provision of social, economic and recreational facilities that caused the rural population to migrate to urban areas. The overall growth rate had declined over the last two decades due to poor returns in agriculture and increased migration of agricultural labourers to other urban centres. The population density of the town is high in the centre and low in the peripheral regions.

The town has 55% employed people; 12.7% are involved in primary occupations like agriculture, 2.8% in secondary occupations related to industries and 85% in tertiary occupations such as agricultural trading and tourism. About 33% population of the town is involved in agriculture and most of them are involved in trading activities. As per a survey conducted in 1997 by the Tamil Nadu Urban and Town Planning Department, 30 slums were identified in the town constituting 41% of the total population of the town.

== Economy ==
Thiruvarur lies in the Kaveri River basin and the main occupation of the inhabitants of the town and surrounding regions is agriculture. More than 70% of the workforce is involved in agriculture; 14% being cultivators and rest are agricultural labourers. Paddy is cultivated in three seasons namely Kuruvai (June–August), Samba (August–January) and Thaladi (January–March). The daily wages of the agricultural labourers is more than the rates fixed by the Tamil Nadu government, but due to the decline in number of days of work, the income levels are lower. As of 1998, the male labourers were employed 150 days a year, while the female labourers for 120 days. A government report in 2006 put these numbers at 120 and 100 days respectively. Due to the discontinuity in the working days, the labourers migrate to other states or countries. They also shift to other professions like construction industry in the urban centres and textile industry in the district. There are no industrial estates in the town and the district – as of 2012, a government proposal is formulated to develop one at Vaippur village. Modern agricultural tools like hullers have replaced labourers and reduce the profit margin of small traders and labourers. There are no co-operative societies who acquire the farm products and the District Purchasing Centre, operated by the government of Tamil Nadu is the major procurer.

Being an agricultural town, the predominant industries are agriculture based like modern rice milling, palm oil refinery, poultry, live stock and coir based. Tamil Nadu Civil Supplies Corporation operating a modern rice mill and South India Edible Oil involved in refining oil are the large scale industries in the town. There are small service enterprises involved in automobile servicing, hotels, hospitals, boat repairing and nylon fishnet repairing. There is a weekly market at Thanjai Salai and a daily market maintained by the municipality, where vegetables and fish are sold.

Nationalized banks such as State Bank of India, Indian Bank, Central Bank of India, Punjab National Bank, Indian Overseas Bank and private banks like ICICI Bank, City Union Bank have their branches in Thiruvarur. Kumbakonam Co-operative Bank, Tiruvarur Co-operative Bank and Primary Agriculture Bank are the cooperative banks that have their branches in the town. All these banks have their Automated teller machines located in various parts of the town.

== Transport ==
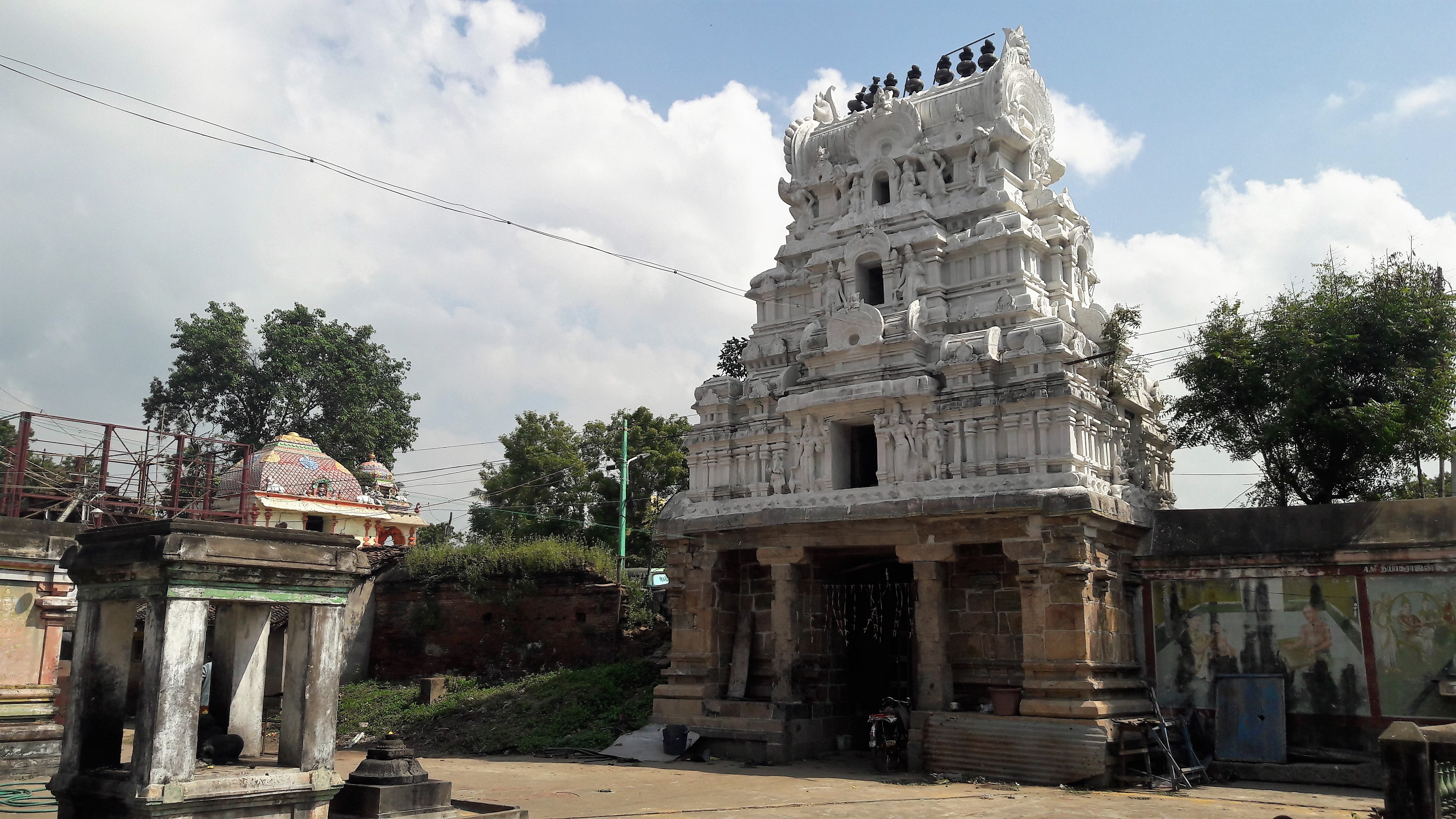
Tamil Nadu State Transport Corporation

Thiruvarur municipality accommodates 94.06 km of roads: 54.9 km of BT roads, 10.91 km of metal roads, 9.48 km of cement roads and 18.75 km of highways. Thiruvarur is connected by three national highways, NH 45A to Viluppuram, NH 67 to Coimbatore. And KSRTC also operating buses from Ernakulam, Cherthala, Changanasserry to Velankanni via Thiruvarur. Thiruvarur having the direct bus services to the following Cities of the State are Chennai, Vellore, Tiruvannamalai, Kanchipuram, Villupuram, Cuddalore, Chidambaram, Coimbatore, Tiruchirapalli, Madurai, Salem, Karaikudi, Hosur, Erode, Tiruppur, Kodaikanal, Palani, Dharapuram, Pudukkottai, Sivagangai, Rameshwaram, Ramanathapuram, Theni, Tiruchendur, Puducherry, Karaikal and other local services to Thanjavur, Kumbakonam, Thiruthuraipoondi, Mannargudi, Mayiladuthurai, Sirkazhi, Pattukkottai, Vedaranyam, Ariyalur, Jayankondam etc. Through the state highways SH 23 from Mayiladuthurai to Thiruthuraipoondi, SH 67 from Thanjavur to Kodikkarai, SH 65 from Thiruvarur to Kumbakonam, SH 66 from Kumbakonam to Adiramapattinam, SH 67 from Nagore to Nachiyar Koil, SH 146 from Mannargudi to Sethubavachatram, SH 147 Kumbakonam to Karaikkal, SH 202 Tiruvarur - Mannargudi - Muthupet, SH 151 Kilvelur to Kachanam. The Tamil Nadu State Transport Corporation operates close to 300 daily services connecting various cities to Thiruvarur. Most of the buses via Thiruvarur are operated by the corporation ply between Tiruchirapalli and Velankanni. The corporation operates a computerised reservation centre in the municipal bus stand of the town. It also operates 40 town buses satisfying the local transport needs of Thiruvarur and the neighbouring villages. The State Express Transport Corporation operates long-distance buses connecting the town to Bangalore, Coimbatore, Chennai, Thiruvananthapuram and Marthandam.

Thiruvarur railway junction is a four way junction connecting Thanjavur in the west, Mayiladuthurai in the north, Nagapattinam in the east and Thiruthuraipoondi in the south. Gauge conversion between Mayiladuthurai and Thiruvarur was completed in August 2012 and the inaugural train ran from Bangalore to Nagore via Thiruvarur. There are passenger trains to Tiruchirapalli, Thanjavur, Mayiladuthurai, Karaikal, Mannargudi and Thiruthuraipoondi. Gauge conversion between Thiruvarur and Karaikudi is completed now so daily trains are available to Karaikudi and manamadurai. There is a daily express train to Chennai via Mayiladuthurai and Ernakulam. There are two trains from Mannargudi to Tirupathi and Velankanni to Goa, operated three times a week that pass through Thiruvarur. The nearest airport to Thiruvarur is Tiruchirappalli International Airport, which is located 110 km (68 mi) from the town.The nearest seaport is located at Nagapattinam which is about 27 km (17 mi) from the town.

== Education and utility services ==
As of 2001, Thiruvarur has a lower literacy rate compared to other part of the state. There are three government high schools out of a total of 15 schools in the town. The Central University of Tamil Nadu, established by an act of parliament in 2009, provides collegiate education in the fields of arts and science. There are five other arts and science colleges, one teacher training institute, three polytechnic colleges and two Industrial training institutes (ITI) in the town.

Electricity supply to Thiruvarur is regulated and distributed by the Thiruvarur circle of Tamil Nadu Electricity Board (TNEB). Water supply is provided by the Thiruvarur Municipality from Odambokki river; the distribution through water tanks located at Madapuram, Thendral Nagar, Kidarakondan, Kattapomman street, Mettupalayam, IP Koil street, Maruthapttinam and Weekly Shandy having a total capacity of 4,260 kl (1,130,000 US gal). About 18 t (40,000 lb) of solid waste is collected from the town everyday; 56% domestic wastes and 40% commercial wastes. Thiruvarur municipality is implementing underground drainage and the current sewerage system for disposal of sullage is through septic tanks and public conveniences. Roadside drains carry untreated sewage out of the town to let out raw into the sea or accumulates in low-lying area.

Thiruvarur comes under the Thiruvarur Telecom circle of the Bharat Sanchar Nigam Limited (BSNL), India's state-owned telecom and internet services provider. Apart from telecom, BSNL also provides broadband internet service. There are three government hospitals in the town; the largest of them is the District Headquarters Government Hospital. There are 11 private hospitals and numerous medical shops catering to the healthcare need of the town.

== Municipal administration and politics ==
Municipality officials
Chairman	vacant
Commissioner	vacant
Vice Chairman	vacant
Elected members
Member of Legislative Assembly	Poondi K Kalaivaanan
Member of Parliament	Selvaraj

Until 1860, Thiruvarur was the headquarters of a taluka of the same name. It was declared a third grade municipality in 1914 during the rule of British. It was promoted to a first grade municipality in 1978. The municipality has 30 wards and there is an elected councilor for each of those wards. The municipality has seven revenue villages: Vilamal, Vijayaruram, Thiruvarur south, Thiruvarur North, Keelakavadhukudi, Ramage, Sundaravilakam and Kidaramkondan. The functions of the municipality are devolved into six departments: general administration/personnel, engineering, revenue, health, town planning and information technology (IT). All these departments are under the control of a municipal commissioner who is the executive head. The legislative powers are vested in a body of 30 members, one each from the 30 wards. The legislative body is headed by an elected chairperson assisted by a deputy chairperson. Tiruvarur district was created in January 1997 and Tiruvarur town became the district headquarters.

Thiruvarur comes under the Thiruvarur assembly constituency and it elects a member to the Tamil Nadu Legislative Assembly once every five years. Till 2006, the constituency was reserved for SC (Scheduled Caste) candidates. From the 1977 elections, the assembly seat was won by DMK for five times during 1977, 1996, 2001, 2006 and 2011 elections and Communist Party of India for four times during 1980, 1984, 1989 and 1991 elections. The former MLA of the constituency is Muthuvel Karunanidhi, ex-chief minister and the leader of Dravida Munnetra Kazhagam (DMK).

Thiruvarur is a part of the Nagapattinam (Lok Sabha constituency) – it has the following six assembly constituencies – Thiruvarur, Nagapattinam, Thiruthuraipoondi, Vedaranyam, Kilvelur (SC) and Nannilam. The current Member of Parliament from the constituency is Dr. K. Gopal from the AIADMK. From 1957, the Nagapattinam parliament seat was held by the Indian National Congress for four times during 1957–1961, 1962–67, 1967–71 and 1991–96. CPI won the seat for 5 times during 1971–77, 1977–80, 1989–91, 1996–98 and 1998 elections. DMK won 4 times during 1980–84, 1999–2004, 2004–09 and 2009-2014 elections. AIADMK won the seat two times during 1984–89 and 2014.

Law and order in the town in maintained by the Thiruvarur sub division of the Tamil Nadu Police headed by a Deputy Superintendent. There are three police stations in the town, one of them being an all-women police station. There are special units like prohibition enforcement, district crime, social justice and human rights, district crime records and special branch that operate at the district level police division headed by a Superintendent of Police.

== Culture ==
=== The Thyagaraja temple ===
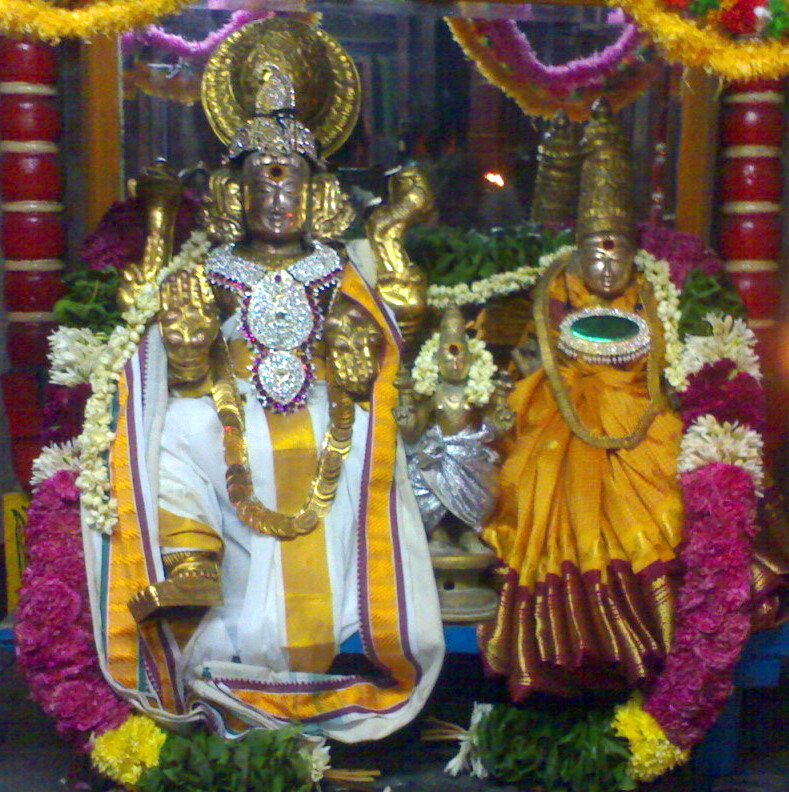
Worship of Lord Thyagaraja is associated with the Somaskanda depiction of Lord(s) Shiva, Skanda and Parvathi.

The ancient Thyagaraja Temple at Thiruvarur is dedicated to the Somaskanda aspect of Shiva. Thygaraja is the iconic form of Somaskanda and is believed to have spread widely from the tenth century CE, the period coinciding the reign of Raja Raja Chola. The temple complex spanning over an area of 20 acres (81,000 m^{2}) has shrines dedicated to Vanmikanathar, Thyagaraja, Kamalaamba and numerous other deities. Vanmikinathar is believed to have arisen from an anthill and from the trumpet flower, Bignonia Chelenoides. The Kamalalayam temple tank covers around 33 acres (130,000 m^{2}), making it one of the largest in the country. The temple chariot is the largest of its kind in Tamil Nadu. Thyagaraja is believed to have performed 364 miracles in Thiruvarur similar to the 64 performed at Madurai Meenakshi Temple. Pilgrims take a holy dip in the tank during Hindu auspicious occasions like equinox and eclipse. The temple is also classified as Saptha Vidangam, meaning the seven temples having unique dance moves by Thyagaraja. The Chola inscriptions refer Thyagaraja as Vidhividangar and the name "Thyagaraja" is believed to have emerged during the 15–16th century CE.

Number of tourists
Year	Pop.
2001	260,750
2002	275,900
2003	301,100
2004	321,400
Sources: 2001 – 04:

=== Music, dance and literature ===
Historically Thiruvarur has been a centre of eminent people in religion, arts and science. Sundarar, an eighth-century Saivite saint, mentions "I am the slave of all those born in Thiruvarur" in his works in Tevaram. Two of the 63 nayanmars of Saivite tradition namely, Kalarsinga Nayanar and Tandiyadigal Nayanar were born in Thiruvarur. The Periyapuranam, a 12th-century Saiva canonical by Sekkizhar, dedicates a chapter to those born in Thiruvarur including these two saints. The town was a traditional centre of music and dance – the inscriptions from Rajaraja Chola associates a large body of dancers associated with the temple. Thiruvarur is home to Trinity of Carnatic music namely Thyagaraja (1767–1847 CE), Muthuswami Dikshitar (1775–1835 CE) and Shyama Shastri (1762–1827 CE). Muthuswami Dikshitar has sung eulogies of the temple deities of the Thyagarajaswami temple. There was large influx of the acumen of South Indian culture to the town during the 17th century CE due to the political unrest in Thanjavur and increased patronage of the Maratha kings to Thiruvarur, resulting in developments in music and dance. A unique musical instrument called Panchamuga Vadyam with each of its five ends ornamented differently is used in the temple. A type of nadaswaram (pipe instrument) called Barinayanam is also a unique instrument found only in Thiruvarur.

=== Chariot festival ===
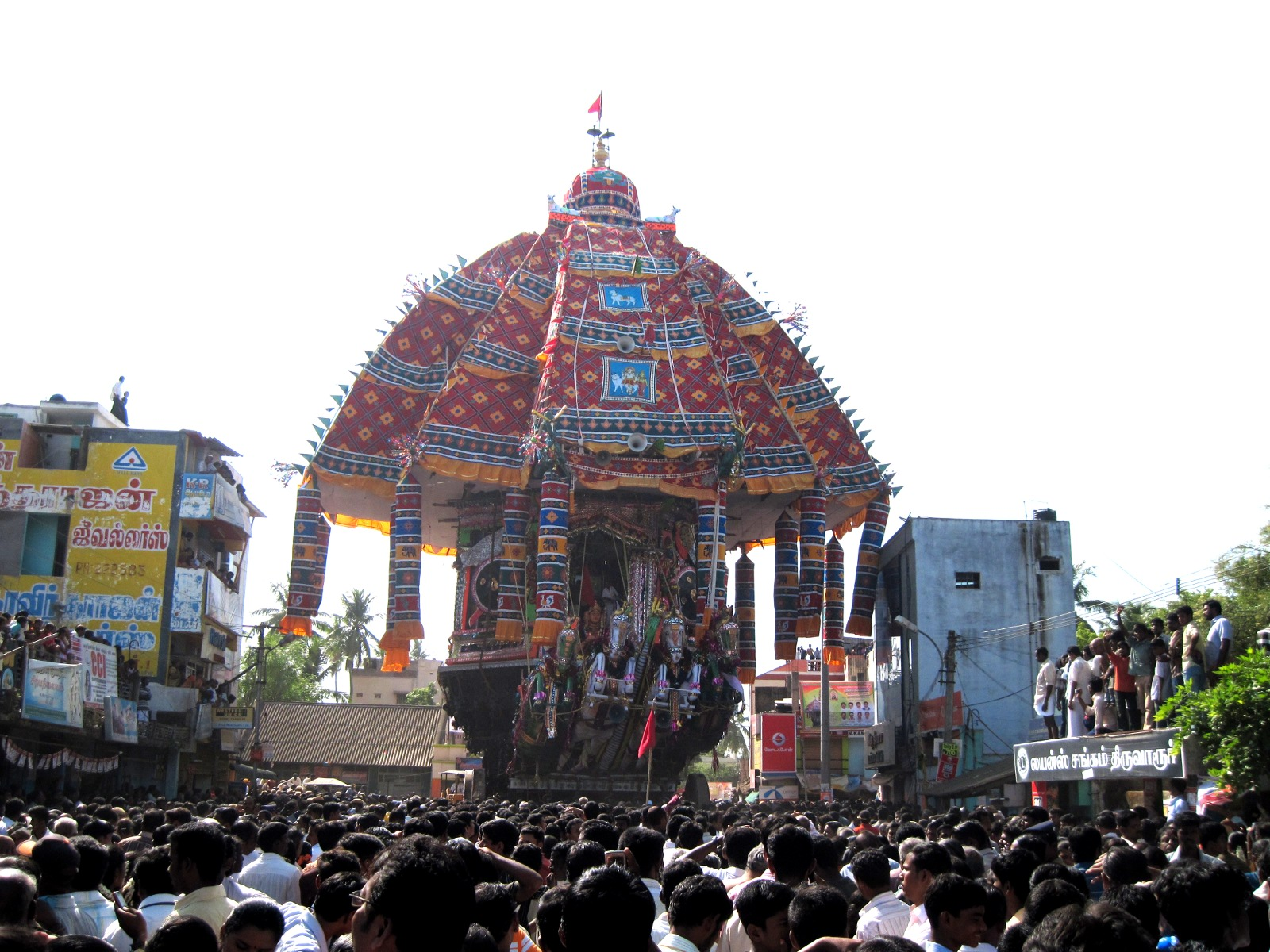
Thiruvarur temple chariot festival depicting the largest temple chariot in World

Kulothunga Chola II (1133–50 CE) enlarged the temple ritual to have fifty six festivals, some of which are followed in modern times. The annual chariot festival of the Thygarajaswamy temple is celebrated during April – May, corresponding to the Tamil month of Chitrai. The chariot is the largest of its kind in Tamil Nadu and also No.1 Place of Biggest Chariot in the World weighing 360 tonne with a height of 96 feet. The chariot comes around the four main streets surrounding the temple during the festival. The event is attended by lakhs of people from all over Tamil Nadu. The chariot festival is followed by the "Theppam", meaning float festival. The Carnatic music festival celebrated every year also garners large audience. The town has 10 parks, with the Somasundaram Park at Panagal Road and Municipal Park at Thendral Nagar being the most prominent of them.

== Notable people ==
- Bakthavathsalam – Mridangam player
- K. Balachander – Tamil film maker and director
- Muthuswami Dikshitar – Carnatic classical composer and part of trinity
- M. Karunanidhi- Former Chief Minister of Tamil Nadu and former DMK president.
- Syama Sastri – Carnatic classical composer and part of trinity
- Rajan Somasundaram – Film Music Director, multi-instrumentalist, created first music album on Sangam period poetry
- Tyagaraja – Carnatic classical composer and part of trinity

== Notes ==
=== Footnotes ===
- The official spelling, as per the municipality website is "Thiruvarur".
