= Yadukulakamboji =

Janya raga of Carnatic music

- Arohanam: S R₂ M₁ P D₂ Ṡ
- Avarohanam: Ṡ N₂ D₂ P M₁ G₃ R₂ S

Yadukulakamboji or Yadukulakambodi (yadukulakāmbhōji) is a ragam in Carnatic music (musical scale of South Indian classical music). It is a janya rāgam (derived scale) of the 28th melakarta scale Harikambhoji, and is sometimes spelled as Yadukulakambhoji or Yadukulakambhodi. It is a janya scale, as it does not have all the seven swaras (musical notes) in the ascending scale. It is a combination of the pentatonic scale Shuddha Saveri and the sampurna raga scale Harikambhoji.

== Structure and Lakshana ==
Ascending scale with shadjam at C, which is same as Shuddha Saveri scale

Descending scale with shadjam at C, which is same as Harikambhoji scale

Yadukulakamboji is an asymmetric rāgam that does not contain gandharam and nishadam in the ascending scale. It is an audava-sampurna rāgam (or owdava rāgam, meaning pentatonic ascending scale). Its ārohaṇa-avarohaṇa structure (ascending and descending scale) is as follows:

- ārohaṇa : S R₂ M₁ P D₂ Ṡ (Note: Alternate notations: Hindustani: S R M P D Ṡ; Western: C D F G A C)
- avarohaṇa : Ṡ N₂ D₂ P M₁ G₃ R₂ S (Note: Alternate notations: Hindustani: Ṡ Ṉ D P M G R S; Western: C B♭ A G F E D C)

The notes used in this scale are shadjam, chathusruthi rishabham, shuddha madhyamam, panchamam and chathusruthi dhaivatam in ascending scale, with kaisiki nishadham and antara gandharam included in descending scale. For the details of the notations and terms, see swaras in Carnatic music. In Hindustani raga Jhinjhoti is a close relative, sharing the same notes.
