= List of compositions by Tyagaraja =

Kakarla Tyagabrahmam, colloquially known as Tyāgarāja and Tyagayya, was a prolific composer of Carnatic music or Indian classical music. He was highly influential in the development of the South Indian classical music tradition. Tyagaraja is said to have composed thousands of devotional compositions, most of them in praise of Lord Rama. Tyagaraja’s compositions continue to hold a prominent place in the Carnatic music tradition, especially the Pancharatna Kriti (English: 'five gems'), a set of five pieces which are often featured in concerts dedicated to his legacy.

== Ghana Raga Pancharatnam ==
#	Composition	Raga	Tāḷa	Language
1	Jagadānanda kāraka జగదానంద కారక	Nāṭa	Ādi	Sanskrit
2	Duḍukugala nannē దుడుకుగల నన్నే	Gauḷa	Ādi	Telugu
3	Sādhiñcenē ō manasā సాధించెనే ఓ మనసా	Ārabhi	Ādi	Telugu
4	Kana kana rucirā కనకనరుచిరా	Varāḷi	Ādi	Telugu
5	Endarō mahānubhāvulu ఎందరో మహానుభావులు	Śrī	Ādi	Telugu

== Narada Pancharatnam ==
#	Composition	Raga	Tāḷa	Language
1	Sri Narada Nadha	Kaanada	Rupaka	Telugu
2	Vara Narada	Vijayashri	Ādi	Telugu
3	Narada Muni Vedalina	Kamavardhani	Rupaka	Telugu
4	Sri Narada Muni	Bhairavi	Ādi	Telugu
5	Narada Guruswami	Darbar	Ādi	Telugu

== Thiruvottriyur Pancharatnam ==
These kritis are composed on the Goddess Tripurasundari of the Thyagaraja Temple at Thiruvottriyur. It is said that Thyagaraja composed these at the request of his disciple Veena Kuppayyar.

#	Composition	Raga	Tāḷa	Language
1	kanna talli కన్న తల్లి	Sāvēri	Ādi	Telugu
2	sundari ninnu సుందరి నిన్ను	Ārabhi	Miśra cāpu	Telugu
3	sundari nannindarilō సుందరి నన్నిందరిలో	Bēgadā	Rūpaka	Telugu
4	sundari nī divya rūpamunu సుందరి నీ దివ్య రూపమును	Kalyāṇi	Ādi	Telugu
5	dārini telusukoṇṭi దారిని తెలుసుకొంటి	Suddha Sāvēri	Ādi	Telugu

== Kovur Pancharatnam ==
The following kritis are composed on the presiding deity of the Sundareswarar Temple at Kovur.

#	Composition	Raga	Tāḷa	Language
1	ī vasudha ఈ వసుధ	Sahānā	Ādi	Telugu
2	kōri sēvimpa rārē కోరి సేవింప రారే	Kharaharapriya	Ādi	Telugu
3	śambhō mahādēva	Pantuvarāḷi	Rūpaka	Sanskrit
4	nammi vaccina నమ్మి వచ్చిన	Kalyāṇi	Rūpaka	Telugu
5	sundarēśvaruni సుందరేశ్వరుని	Shankarābharanam	Ādi	Telugu

== Shriranga Pancharatnam ==
#	Composition	Raga	Tāḷa	Language
1	cūtāmu rārē చూతము రారె	Ārabhi	Rūpaka	Telugu
2	ō raṅga śāyi ఓ రంగశాయి	Kāmbhōji	Ādi	Telugu
3	karuṇa jūḍavayya కరుణ జూడవయ్య	Sārangā	Ādi	Telugu
4	rāju veḍale రాజు వెడళే	Tōdi	Rūpaka	Telugu
5	vinarādā వినరాద	Devagāndhāri	Ādi	Telugu

== Lalgudi Pancharatnam ==
Thyagaraja composed the following krithis on the deities Saptarishishwarar and his consort Pravrddha Shrimati at their temple in Lalgudi (previously known as Thiruthavathurai).

#	Composition	Raga	Tāḷa	Language
1	gati nīvani గతి నీవని	Tōdi	Ādi	Telugu
2	lalitē śrī pravṛddhē లలితే శ్రీ ప్రవృద్ధే	Bhairavi	Ādi	Telugu
3	dēva śrī देव श्री	Madhyamāvati	Miśra cāpu	Sanskrit
4	mahita pravṛddha महित प्रवृद्ध	Kāmbhōji	Triputa	Sanskrit
5	īśa pāhi māṃ ఈశా పాహిమాం	Kalyāṇi	Rūpaka	Telugu

== Panchanadheeswara Thiruvaiyaru Kritis ==
=== Pancha Nadīśvara Kritis ===
#	Composition	Raga	Tāḷa	Language
1	ilalō praṇatārti ఇలలో ప్రణతార్తి	Athāna	Ādi	Telugu
2	evarunnāru brōva ఎవరున్నారు బ్రోవ	Māḷavashri	Ādi	Telugu
3	ēhi trijagadīśa एहि त्रिजगदीश	Sārangā	Miśra cāpu	Sanskrit
4	muccaṭa brahmādulaku ముచ్చట బ్రహ్మాదులకు	Madhyamāvati	Ādi	Telugu

=== Dharmasamvardhani Devi Kritis ===
#	Composition	Raga	Tāḷa	Language
1	karuṇa jūḍavamma కరుణ జూడవమ్మ	Tōdi	Ādi	Telugu
2	parā śakti manupa rādā పరా శక్తి మనుప రాదా	Sāvēri	Ādi	Telugu
3	nīvu brōva valenamma నీవు బ్రోవ వలెనమ్మ	Sāvēri	Ādi	Telugu
4	bālē bālēndu bhūṣaṇi బాలే బాలేందు భూషణి	Rītigauḷa	Ādi	Telugu
5	amma dharmasaṃvardhani అమ్మ ధర్మసంవర్ధని	Athāna	Ādi	Telugu
6	vidhi śakrādulaku విధి శక్రాదులకు	Yamunā Kaḷyāṇi	Rūpaka	Telugu
7	śivē pāhi mām శివే పాహి మాం	Kalyāṇi	Ādi	Telugu
8	amba ninu nammiti అంబ నిను నమ్మితి	Ārabhi	Ādi	Telugu

== Kritis composed at Kanchipuram ==
=== Varadaraja Perumal Kritis ===
#	Composition	Raga	Tāḷa	Language
1	varadā navanītāśa pāhi वरदा नवनीताश पाहि	Rāgapanjaram	Miśra cāpu	Sanskrit
2	varada rāja ninu kōri vacciti వరద రాజ నిను కోరి వచ్చితి	Swarabhushani	Rūpaka	Telugu

=== Kanchi Kamakshi Kriti ===
#	Composition	Raga	Tāḷa	Language
1	vināyakuni valenu brōvavē వినాయకుని వలెను బ్రోవవే	Madhyamāvati	Ādi	Telugu

== Tirupati Venkateshwara Kritis ==
#	Composition	Raga	Tāḷa	Language
1	tera tīyaga rādā తెర తీయగ రాదా	Gauḷipantu	Ādi	Telugu
2	veṅkaṭēśa ninu sēvimpanu వెంకటేశ నిను సేవింపను	Madhyamāvati	Ādi	Telugu

== Neelayatakshi Kritis ==
The following kritis are addressed to Goddess Neelayatakshi of Kayarohanaswami Temple at Nagapattinam.

#	Composition	Raga	Tāḷa	Language
1	evaru teliya poyyēru ఎవరు తెలియ పొయ్యేరు	Tōdi	Rūpaka	Telugu
2	karmamē balavantamāyā కర్మమే బలవంతమాయా	Sāvēri	Miśra cāpu	Telugu

== Divya Nāma Sankīrtana ==
Composition	Raga	Tāḷa	Language
vara-līla gāna-lōla sura-pāla suguṇa-jāla bharita nīla-gaḷa hṛdālaya वर-लील, गान-लोल, सुर-पाल, सुगुण-जाल भरित निल-गळ हृदालय	Śaṃkarābharaṇaṃ	Tiśra laghu	Sanskrit
Dīna janāvana śrī rāma - Dānava haraṇa śrī rāma - vīna vimāma śrī rāma - mīna śarīra śrī rāma दीन जनावन श्री राम- दानव हरण श्री राम - वीन विमान श्री राम - मीन शरीर श्री राम	Bhūpālaṃ	Ādi	Sanskrit
Callarē rāmacandrunipai pūla చల్లరే రామచంద్రునిపై పూల...	Ahiri	Miśra cāpu	Telugu
Daśaratha nandana dānava mardana dayayā māṃ pāhi దశరథ నన్దన దానవ మర్దన దయయా మాం పాహి	Asāvēri	Ādi	Telugu
maravakarā nava manmatha rūpuni మరవ..	Ahiri	Miśra cāpu	Telugu
maravakarā nava manmatha rūpuni మరవకురా నవ మన్మథ రూపుని	Dēvagāndhāri	Ādi	Telugu
nārāyaṇa hari nārāyaṇa hari నారాయణ హరి నారాయణ హరి	Yamunā Kaḷyāṇi	Ādi	Telugu
ō rāma ō rāma ōṅkāra dhāma ఓ రామ ఓ రామ ఓఙ్కార ధామ	Arabhi	Ādi	Telugu
pāhi rāma rāmayanucu bhajana śēyavē పాహి రామ రామయనుచు భజన శెయవే	kharahara Priya	Rūpaka	Telugu
pāhi māṃ harē mahānubhāva rāghava పాహి మాం హరే మహానుభావ రాఘవ	Saurāṣṭra	Rūpaka	Telugu
pālaya śrī raghuvīra sukṛpālaya rāja kumāra māṃ పాలయ శ్రీ రఘువీర సుకృపాలయ రాజ కుమార మాం	Dēvagāndhāri	Ādi	Telugu
rāma pāhi mēgha śyāma pāhi guṇadhāma mām pāhi ō rāma రామ పాహి మేఘ శ్యామ పాహి గుణధామ మామ్ పాహి ఓ రామ	Kāpi	Ādi	Telugu
rāma rāma rāma māṃ pāhi రామ రామ రామ మాం పాహి	Yamunā Kaḷyāṇi	Ādi	Telugu
vandanamu raghu nandana sētu bandhana bhakta candana rāma వన్దనము రఘు నన్దన సేతు బంధన భక్త చన్దన రామ	Sahana	Ādi	Telugu

== Utsava Sampradāya Kritis ==
#	Composition	Raga	Tāḷa	Language	Other Info
1	heccarikagā rārā hē rāmacandra హెచ్చరికగా రారా హే రామచన్ద్ర	Yadukula Kāmbhōji	Khanḍa cāpu	Telugu	heccharika pāṭa
2	sītā kalyāṇa vaibhōgamē సీతా కల్యాణ వైభోగమే	Kurinji/Shankarābharanam	Khanḍa cāpu	Telugu	gauri kalyāṇamu
3	nagumōmu galavāni nā manōharuni నగుమోము గలవాని నా మనోహరుని	Madhyamāvati	Ādi	Telugu	nalugu pāṭa
4	nāpāli śrī rāma bhūpālaka sōma నాపాలి శ్రీ రామ భూపాలక సోమ	Shankarābharanam	Ādi	Telugu	nalugu pāṭa
5	jaya maṅgaḷaṃ nitya śubha maṅgaḷaṃ जय मंगळं नित्य शुभ मंगळं	Ghaṇta	Jhampa	Sanskrit	nalugu maṅgaḷamu
6	jaya maṅgaḷaṃ nitya śubha maṅgaḷaṃ జయ మంగళం నిత్య శుభ మంగళం	Nādanāmakriya	Ādi	Telugu	nalugu maṅgaḷamu
7	patiki hāratī rē పతికి హారతీ రే	Surati	Ādi	Telugu	śōbhana hāratu
8	patiki maṅgaḷa hāratirē పతికి మంగళ హారతిరే	Ārabhi	Ādi	Telugu	śōbhana hāratu
9	śōbhānē శోభానే	Pantuvarāḷi	Rūpaka	Telugu	śōbhānē
10	pūla pānupu mīda పూల పానుపు మీద	Āhiri	Ādi (tisralagu)	Telugu	pavvalimpu pāṭa
11	baḍalika tīra బడలిక తీర	Rītigauḷa	Ādi	Telugu	pavvalimpu pāṭa
12	lāli lāliyaniyūcedarā లాలి లాలియనియూచెదరా	Harikāmbhōji	Ādi	Telugu	lāli pāṭa
13	lāli lālayya lāli లాలి లాలయ్య లాలి	Kēdāragaula	Jhampa	Telugu	lāli pāṭa
14	rāma śrī rāma lāli రామ శ్రీ రామ లాలి	Shankarābharanam	Ādi	Telugu	lāli pāṭa
15	uyyālalūgavayya śrī rāma ఉయ్యాలలూగవయ్య శ్రీ రామ	Niīāṃbari	Jhampa	Telugu	lāli pāṭa
16	lāliyūgavē māpāli daivamā లాలియూగవే మాపాలి దైవమా	Niīāṃbari	Rūpaka	Telugu	lāli pāṭa
17	rāma rāma rāma lāli రామ రామ రామ లాలి	Sahānā	Miśra cāpu	Telugu	lāli pāṭa
18	kṣīra sāgara vihāra क्षीर सागर विहार	Ānanda Bhairavi	Jhampa	Sanskrit	lāli pāṭa
19	rakṣa peṭṭarē doraku రక్ష పెట్టరే దొరకు	Bhairavi	Ādi	Telugu	lāli pāṭa
20	śrī rāma rāma rāma శ్రీ రామ రామ రామ	Niīāṃbari (alt. Gōpikā Vasantam)	Jhampa	Telugu	lāli pāṭa
21	jō jō rāma ānanda ghana జో-జో రామ ఆనంద ఘన	Rītigauḷa	Ādi	Telugu	jōla pāṭa
22	mēlukōvayya mammēlukō rāma మెలుకోవయ్య మమ్మేలుకో రామ	Bauḷi	Jhampa	Telugu	mēlu kolupu pāṭa
23	mēlukō dayā nidhī మేలుకో దయా నిధీ	Saurāṣtram	Rūpaka	Telugu	mēlu kolupu pāṭa
24	jānakī nāyaka జానకీ నాయక	Dhanyāsi	Ādi	Telugu	maṅgaḷamu
25	mā rāmacandruniki మా రామచంద్రునికి	Kēdāragaula	Ādi	Telugu	maṅgaḷamu

== Musical Dramas ==
=== Prahlada Bhakti Vijayam ===
Composition	Raga	Tāḷa	Language
śrī gaṇapatini sēvimpa rārē శ్రీ గణపతిని సేవింప రారే	Saurāṣṭra	Ādi	Telugu
vāsudēvayani veḍalinayī dauvārikuni kanarē వాసుదేవయని వెడలినయీ దౌవారికుని కనరే	Kaḷyāṇi	Ādi	Telugu
vinatāsuta rārā nā vinuti gaikonarā వినతాసుత రారా నా వినుతి గైకొనరా	husEni	Ādi	Telugu
nārada muni veḍalina suguṇātiśayamu vinarē నారద ముని వెడలిన సుగుణాతిశయము వినరే	Pantuvaraḷi	Tisra Nadai Adi Talam	Telugu
ipuḍaina nanu talacinārā svāmi ఇపుడైనా నను తలచినారా స్వామి	Arabhi	Miśra cāpu	Telugu
ēṭi janmamidi hā ō rāma ఏటి జన్మమిది హా ఓ రామ	Varāḷi	Miśra cāpu	Telugu
ē nāṭi nōmu phalamō ē dāna balamō ఏ నాటి నోము ఫలమో ఏ దాన బలమో	bhairavi	Ādi	Telugu
aḍugu varamulaniccedanu అడుగు వరములిచ్చెదను	Arabhi	Miśra cāpu	Telugu
tanalōnē dhyāniñci tanmayamē kāvalerā తనలోనే ధ్యానిఞ్చి తన్మయమే కావలెరా	Dēvagāndhāri	Ādi	Telugu
rārā māyiṇṭidāka raghuvīra sukumāra mrokkedarā రారా మాయిణ్టిదాక రఘువీర సుకుమార మ్రొక్కెదరా	Asāvēri	Ādi	Telugu

=== Nouka Charitram ===
Composition	Raga	Tāḷa	Language
Srungarinchu koni vedaliri	Surutti		Telugu
Aadavaarella goodi	Yadhu kula Khamboji		Telugu
Choodare chelulaaraa Yamuna devi	Panthuvarali		Telugu
Yemani nera nammu kondhumu Krishna	Saurashtram		Telugu
Yememo theliyaka balikedharu namida dayleka	Saurashtram		Telugu
ōḍanu jaripē mucchaṭa kanarē vanitalāra nēḍu ఓడను జరిపే ముచ్ఛట కనరే వనితలార నేడు	Sāranga		Telugu
Thanayandhe premayanusu viribonulu	Bhairavi		Telugu
Yenomu nochithmo chelula	Punnagavarali		Telugu
cālu cālu nī yuktulu naḍavadu sārasākṣa śrī kṛṣṇā చాలు చాలు నీ యుక్తులు నడవవు సారసాక్ష శ్రీ కృష్ణా	Sāvēri	Ādi	Telugu
Choothamu rare yi vedkanu	Kapi		Telugu
evaru manaku samānamilalō-nintulāra nēḍu ఎవరు మనకు సమానమిలలో నిన్తులార నేడు	Dēvagāndhāri	Ādi	Telugu
Unnathavuna nunda niyyadhu	Gantaa		
Alla kallolamayenamma Yamunadevi	Saurashtram		
perugu pAlu bujiyinchi	Gantaa		
kRshNA mAkEmi dhova baluku	Punnagavarali		
indukEmi sEtu mamma	Varali		
vEda vAkyamani yenchiri	Mohana		
hari hari nIyokka divya	Punnagavarali		
gandhamu puyyarugā pannīru gandhamu puyyarugā గంధము పుయ్యరుగా పన్నీరు గంధము పుయ్యరుగా	Punnāga Varāḷi	Ādi	Telugu
ghuma ghumayani vasanathoSaurashtram	Saurashtram		
mA kulamuna kiha pramosagina	Surutti		Telugu

== Other Kritis ==
Composition	Raga	Tāḷa	Language
abhimānamu lēdēmi nīvabhinaya vacanamulāḍēdēmi	Andhāḷi	Miśra cāpu	Telugu
āḍa mōḍi galadā rāmayya māṭa (lāḍa)	Cāru kēśi	Ādi	Telugu
anurāgamu lēni manasuna sujñānamu rādu	Sarasvati	Rūpaka	Telugu
aparādhamulanōrva samayamu kṛpa jūḍumu ghanamaina nā	Rasāḷi		Telugu
appa rāma bhakti yentō gopparā mā (yappa)	Pantu Varāḷi	Rūpaka	Telugu
āragimpavē pālāragimpavē	Tōḍi	Rūpaka	Telugu
bāgāyenayya nī māyalentō	candra jyoti	Dēśa Ādi	Telugu
bantu reethi kolu	Hamsa nādam	Dēśa Ādi	Telugu
brōva bhāramā raghurāma bhuvanamella nīvai nannokani	Bahudāri	Ādi	Telugu
cakkani rāja mārgamuluṇḍaga sandula dūranēla ō manasā	Kharaharapriya	Ādi	Telugu
daya sēyavayyā sadaya rāmacandra	yadukula kāmbhoji	Ādi	Telugu
dina maṇi vaṃśa tilaka lāvaṇya dīna śaraṇya	hari kāmbhōji	Ādi	Telugu
dhyānamē varamaina gaṅgā snānamē manasā	dhanyāsi	Adi	Telugu
dvaitamu sukhamā advaitamu sukhamā	Rīti Gauḷa	Adi	Telugu
ē dāri sañcarinturā yika palkarā	Śr̥ti ranjani	Dēśa Ādi	Telugu
ē tāvunarā nilakaḍa nīku	Kaḷyāṇi	Ādi	Telugu
ēmani pogaḍudurā śrī rāma ninn(ēmani)	Vīra vasantaṁ	Adi	Telugu
ēmi dōva palkumāyikanu nēnendu pōdu śrī rāma	Sāranga	Ādi	Telugu
ennāḷḷu tirigēdiyennāḷḷu	Māḷava śrī	Ādi	Telugu
enta vēḍukondu rāghava pantamēlarā ō rāghava	Sarasvati manōhari	Ādi	Telugu
evariccirirā śaracāpamulu nīkina kulābdhi candra	Madhyamāvati		Telugu
evari māṭa vinnāvō rāvō indu lēvō bhaḷi bhaḷi	Kāmbhōji	Ādi	Telugu
gānāmūrtē śrī kṛṣṇa vēṇu gāna lōla tribhuvana pāla pāhi	Gāna mūrti	Dēśa Adi	Sanskrit
giri pai nelakonna rāmuni guri tappaka kaṇṭi	Sahana		Telugu
giriraja suta tanaya sadaya	Bangaala	Desa Adi	Telugu
hari dāsulu veḍale muccaṭa kani ānandamāye dayāḷō	Yamuna Kaḷyāṇi	Ādi	Telugu
kāla haraṇa mēlarā harē sītārāma	shuddha saveri	Rupaka	Telugu
kalugunā pada nīraja sēva gandha vāha tanaya	Pūrṇa lalita	Ādi	Telugu
karuṇā samudra nanu kāvavē śrī rāma bhadra	Dēvagāndhāri	Ādi	Telugu
koluvaiyunnāḍē kōdaṇḍa pāṇi	Dēvagāndhāri	Adi	Telugu
kṣīra sāgara śayana nannu cintala peṭṭa valenā rāma	Dēvagāndhāri	Ādi	Telugu
līlagānu jūcu	Dundhubi/Divyamani	Ādi	Telugu
mā jānaki cēṭṭa paṭṭaga maharājavaitivi	Kāmbhōji	Desadi	Telugu
manasā eṭulōrtunē nā manavi cēkonavē ō	Maḷayamārutam	Rūpaka	Telugu
manasā śrī rāmacandruni maravakē ēmarakē ō (manasā)	Īsha manōhari		Telugu
manavyāḷakinca rādaṭē marmamella telpedanē manasā	Naḷina kānti	Dēśa Ādi	Telugu
mari-mari ninnē moraliḍa nī manasuna daya rādu	Kāmbhōji	Ādi	Telugu
marugēlarā ō rāghava	jayanta śrī	Dēśa Ādi	Telugu
mōhana rāma mukha jita sōma mudduga palkumā	Mōhana	Ādi	Telugu
mōkṣamu galadā bhuvilō jīvanmuktulu kāni vārulaku	Sāramati	Ādi	Telugu
nāda lōluḍai brahmānandamandavē manasā	Kaḷyāṇa vasanta	Rūpaka	Telugu
nāda sudhā rasambilanu narākṛti yāye manasā	Arabhi	Rūpaka	Telugu
nādatanumaniśaṃ śaṅkaram namāmi mē manasā śirasā	citta ranjani	Ādi	Sanskrit
nagumōmu ganalēni nā jāli telisi nanu brōvaga rādā śrī raghuvara nī	Abhēri	Ādi	Telugu
nā moralanu vini ēmaravalenā pāmara manujulalō ō rāma	Arabhi	Ādi	Telugu
nā morālakimpavēmi śrī rāma	Dēvagāndhāri	Rūpaka	Telugu
nannu kanna talli nā bhāgyamā nārāyaṇi dharmāmbikē	Sindhu kannaḍa	Ādi	Telugu
nārada gāna lōla nata jana paripāla	Atāṇā	Ādi	Telugu
nidhi cāla sukhamā rāmuni sannidhi sēva sukhamā - nijamuga palku manasā	Kaḷyāṇi	Miśra cāpu	Telugu
nija marmamulanu telisina vārini nīvalayiñcēdēmakō rāma	Umābharaṇam	Ādi	Telugu
ninnē bhajana sēyu vāḍanu	Nāṭa	Rūpaka	Telugu
ninnē nera namminānu nīrajākṣa nanu brōvumu	Pantu Varāḷi	Rūpaka	Telugu
niravadi sukhada nirmala rūpa nirjita muni śāpa	Ravi candrika	Ādi	Sanskrit
ō rājīvākṣa ōrajūpulu jūcedavērā nē nīku vērā	Arabhi	Miśra cāpu	Telugu
rāga sudhā rasa pānamu jēsi rañjillavē ō manasā	Andōḷika	Ādi	Telugu
palukavēmi nā daivamā parulu navvunadi nyāyamā	Pūrṇa candrika	Ādi	Telugu
para lōka bhayamu lēka bhava pāśa baddhulayyēru	Mandāri	Ādi	Telugu
raghu nāyaka nī pāda yuga rājīvamula nē viḍa jāla śrī (raghu)	Hamsa dhvani	Ādi	Telugu
rāma kōdaṇḍa rāma rāma kalyāṇa rāma	Bhairavi	Ādi	Telugu
rākā śaśi vadana iṅka parākā	takka	Ādi	Telugu
rāma kathā sudhā rasa pānamoka rājyamu jēsunē	Madhyamāvati	Ādi	Telugu
ramiñcuvārevarurā raghūttamā ninu vinā	Supōṣiṇi	Dēśa Ādi	Telugu
rānidi rādu surāsurulakaina	Maṇiraṃgu		Telugu
sāmaja vara gamana sādhu hṛtsārasābja pāla kālātīta vikhyāta	Hindōḷaṃ	Ādi	Telugu
saṅgīta jñānamu bhakti vinā sanmārgamu kaladē manasā	Dhanyāsi		Telugu
sarasa sāma dāna bhēda daṇḍa catura sāṭi daivamevarē brōvavē	Kāpi Nārāyaṇi	Dēśa Ādi	Telugu
sītamma māyamma śrī rāmuḍu mā taṇḍri	vasanta	Rūpaka	Telugu
sītāpatē nā manasuna siddhāntamani yunnānurā	khamās	Rūpaka	Telugu
sītāvara saṅgīta jnanamu dhāta vrāyavalerā	Dēvagāndhāri	Ādi	Telugu
smaraṇē sukhamu rāma nāma naruḍai puṭṭinanduku nāma	Janaranjani	Ādi	Telugu
śōbhillu sapta svara sundarula bhajimpavē manasā	Jaganmōhini	Rūpaka	Telugu
sogasu jūḍa taramā	kannaḍa Gauḷa	Rūpaka	Telugu
sogasugā mṛdaṅga tāḷamu jata gūrci ninu sokka jēyu dhīruḍevvaḍō	śriranjani	Rūpaka	Telugu
śrī raghu kulamandu puṭṭi sītanu ceyi konina rāma candra	Hamsadhvani	Ādi	Telugu
śrī rāma pādamā nī kṛpa cālunē cittāniki rāvē	Amṛta vāhini	Ādi	Telugu
sudhā mādhurya bhāṣaṇa	sindhu rāma kriya		Telugu
sujana jīvana rāma suguṇa bhūṣaṇa rāma	khamās	Ādi	sanskrit
sundara daśaratha nandana vandanamonariñcedarā	kāpi	Ādi	sanskrit
telisi rāma cintanatō nāmamu sēyavē ō manasā	Pūrṇa candrika	Ādi	Telugu
teliya lēru rāma bhakti mārgamunu	Dhēnuka	Ādi	Telugu
śrī tuḷasamma māyiṇṭa nelakonavamma - ī mahini nī samānamevaramma baṅgāru bomma (śrī)	Dēvagāndhāri	Dēśa Ādi	Telugu
tulasī daḷamulacē santoṣamugā pūjintu	Māyāmāḻavagauḻa	Rūpaka	Telugu
vidulaku mrokkeda saṅgīta kōvidulaku	Māyāmāḻavagauḻa		Telugu
vinarādā nā manavi	Dēvagāndhāri		Telugu
yōcanā kamala lōcana nanu brōva	Darbār	Ādi	Telugu
yēlara krishna	kambhoji	Rūpaka	Telugu

== Other Compositions that contain the Thyagaraja mudra ==
Kṛti	Rāga	Language
Abhiṣṭa varadā	Hamsadhvani	Telugu
Sārasa nētra	Śaṃkarābharaṇaṃ	Telugu

== See also ==
- List of compositions by Muthuswami Dikshitar
