= Bhale Bhale Magadivoy (soundtrack) =

Soundtrack album by Gopi Sunder
- Released: 15 August 2014
- Recorded: 2014
- Genre: Feature film soundtrack
- Length: 18:52
- Language: Telugu
- Label: Lahari Music
- Producer: Gopi Sunder

Gopi Sunder chronology
Urumbukal Urangarilla (2015)	Bhale Bhale Magadivoy (2014)	Ennu Ninte Moideen (2015)

Singles from Bhale Bhale Magadivoy
- 1. "Motta Modatisari" Released: 12 August 2014; 2. "Hello Hello" Released: 12 August 2014; 3. "Bhale Bhale Magadivoy" Released: 12 August 2014

Bhale Bhale Magadivoy is the soundtrack to the 2014 film of the same name directed by Maruthi Dasari starring Nani. The soundtrack featured five songs composed by Gopi Sunder, and lyrics written by Ramajogayya Sastry, Sri Mani, and Bhaskarabhatla Ravi Kumar. The soundtrack was released by Lahari Music on 15 August 2014, after three songs from the album were preceded as singles.

== Development ==
Bhale Bhale Magadivoy was Sunder's second Telugu film after Malli Malli Idi Rani Roju. His exposure to Telugu film industry was attributed to their attention towards Malayalam cinema which appreciated the content came during the New generation (Malayalam film movement) and his works for Ustad Hotel (2012) and Bangalore Days (2014) led him to work on Malli Malli Idi Rani Roju and Bhale Bhale Magadivoy.

Sunder adapted the tune of "Endaro Mahanubhavulu", one of Tyagaraja's Pancharatna Kriti, (Note: Pancharatna Kriti is a collection of five songs written and composed by Tyagaraja, an Indian Hindu saint. These songs are "Jagadānanda kārakā", "Duḍukugala nannē", "Sādhinchane", "Kana kana ruci rā", and "Endaro Mahanubhavulu". They are composed using the Nata, Gaula, Arabhi, Varali, and Shree ragas, respectively.) for the song "Endaro" which was composed in classical fusion style and the lyrics were tweaked to suit the film's situation, as "Endaro" was a montage number that was picturised on the protagonist's poor memory and her girlfriends' reaction to it. Nani recalled that the song and picturization had the "contrasting angle" which he liked it. The song was performed by Kochi-based Renuka Arun (in her playback singing debut) who was recommended to Sunder by a guitarist in his group when the former intended to select a singer who "has a strong inclination towards Carnatic music but with an exposure to fusion music". She was not apprehensive of singing for films as she performed several studio albums in the past, until her recommendation for the part which she felt nervous about it, even though she was "well-versed in Carnatic kirtans, which are mostly in old Telugu. So, language was not an issue." Eventually receiving the offer, Arun whom was recovering from an accident, went to the studio for recording the track.

Sachin Warrier performed the song "Motta Modatisari" in his second Telugu stint, after previously singing for Saheba Subramanyam (2014), the Telugu-language adaptation of Thattathin Marayathu (2012). He initially recorded a raw version of the track which was intended to be used while filming. As the team found his voice apt, Warrier was eventually chosen to sing the final version as well, who was helped by its lyricist Ramajogayya Sastry and an assistant director in pronouncing the words correctly. Karthik provided the vocals for three songs: "Bhale Bhale Magadivoy", "Hello Hello" and "How How". Except for the latter, the first two were duets with female vocals performed by Chinmayi and Mohana Bhogaraju.

== Release ==
The first three songs in the album were released on 12 August 2014 at an FM station in Hyderabad. The rest of the songs in the soundtrack album was released on 15 August 2014, three days later at a promotional event held in Hyderabad, with actor Allu Arjun attending as guest of honour. Lahari Music marketed the soundtrack album and released in both digital and physical formats.

== Track listing ==
No.	Title	Lyrics	Artist(s)	Length
1.	"Motta Modatisari"	Ramajogayya Sastry	Sachin Warrier	03:55
2.	"Hello Hello"	Sri Mani	Karthik, Chinmayi	03:33
3.	"Bhale Bhale Magadivoy"	Bhaskarabhatla Ravi Kumar	Karthik, Mohana Bhogaraju	03:47
4.	"Endaro"	Ramajogayya Sastry	Renuka Arun	03:50
5.	"How How"	Bhaskarabhatla Ravi Kumar	Karthik	03:50
Total length:				18:52

== Reception ==
Reviewing the song "Bhale Bhale Magadivoy", Karthik Srinivasan of The Hindu stated that Sunder "ups the ante for the phrase's use with a super bouncy tune, going one up on Mickey J. Meyer's African-style remake of the original", adding that Karthik and Mohana Bhogaraju "are in lively form singing this one". Srinivasan's review for Milliblog regarding the album described it as a "worthy follow-up" for Sunder in Telugu, after a "crackling soundtrack" produced for Malli Malli Idi Rani Roju. Another review from The Hindu stated that Sunder treated the song "Endaro" like a "classic rock song, with drums and violin dominating impressively, even as Renuka is in scintillating form, bringing classical chops to what is treated as a complex, contemporary pop song", adding that it is "less ambitious and sticks faithfully" to the original.

Deepu Joseph of The Times of India gave the soundtrack album 3.5 out of 5 stars and called it an album that "has something in it for everyone and it sure to be a hit". Joseph called "Endaro" an "absolute fusion masterpiece as Gopi Sunder wonderfully fuses Carnatic, rock and Jazz elements as Renuka Arun's voice sounds majestic and takes the song to the next level". Behindwoods gave the soundtrack album 3 out of 5 stars and stated that it is "one of the most melodious albums released in Telugu over the recent times" and that Sunder "sure knows how to blend modernity with rock steady classical music!". Ramesh S. Kannan of Moviecrow rated 3.25 out of 5 saying Sunder gave "quite an engaging and enticing sounds".

== Accolades ==
Ceremony	Category	Nominee	Result	Ref.
5th South Indian International Movie Awards	Best Music Director – Telugu	Gopi Sundar	Nominated	
