= Sindhoora Rekha =

1995 film directed by Sibi Malayil

- Directed by: Sibi Malayil
- Written by: Raghunath Paleri
- Produced by: G. Gopalakrishnan
- Starring: Suresh Gopi; Shobhana; Ranjitha; Narendra Prasad; Dileep
- Cinematography: Venu
- Edited by: L. Bhoominathan
- Music by: Sharreth (songs); Johnson (score)
- Production company: G. K. Movieland
- Distributed by: Gold Star
- Release date: 1995
- Country: India
- Language: Malayalam

Sindhoora Rekha (transl. Vermilion line) is a 1995 Indian Malayalam-language romantic-musical film directed by Sibi Malayil and written by Raghunath Paleri. It stars Suresh Gopi, Shobhana, Narendra Prasad and Ranjitha.

== Plot ==
Balachandran falls in love with Arundhathi, and Arundathi gets pregnant when Balachandran learns that Arundathi has a neurological illness due to brain injury by her brother. She's delivering a baby and dies at the end, leaving Balachandran and baby with Ramani:who loves to marry him since childhood.

== Cast ==
- Suresh Gopi as Balachandran
- Shobana as Arundhathi
- Ranjitha as Ramani
- Narendra Prasad as Menon
- Dileep as Ambujakshan balan's best friend
- Janardanan as Narayanan Nair
- Oduvil Unnikrishnan as Raghavan Nair
- Sankaradi as House Owner Pisharodi
- Harishree Ashokan as Oommachan balan's best friend
- Bobby Kottarakkara as Gouthaman
- Santhosh as Chellappan
- Kundara Johny as Circle Inspector Hari
- Prathapachandran as Doctor Kanaran
- Aranmula Ponnamma as Muthassi
- Meena as Balachandran's Mother
- Zeenath as Rajalakshmi
- Kozhikode Narayanan Nair as Vaidyar

== Soundtrack ==
Sindhoora Rekha

Soundtrack album by Sharreth
- Released: 1995
- Recorded: 1995
- Genre: Feature film soundtrack
- Length: 22:33
- Language: Malayalam
- Label: Ankith Audios; Wilson Audios
- Producer: Sharreth

Sharreth chronology
Thacholi Varghese Chekavar (1995)	Sindhoora Rekha (1995)	Sooryavanam (1998)
External audio
- Audio Jukebox on YouTube

The songs were composed by Sharreth for the lyrics written by Kaithapram Damodaran Namboothiri. The kirtan Pahirama Prabhu was written and composed by Bhadrachala Ramadasu.

No.	Song	Singers	Raga(s)	Length (m:ss)
1	"Raavil Veenanaadham"	K. J. Yesudas, Sujatha	(Ragamalika: Hamsanadam, Kapi)	05:10
2	"Naadham"	K. J. Yesudas	(Ragamalika :Revagupti, Hindolam)	05:00
3	"Kaalindhiyil"	K. J. Yesudas	Shree	04:50
4	"Ente Sindhoora Rekha"	Sujatha, Srinivas	Hindolam	04:18
5	"Pahirama Prabhu"	Sharreth	Madhyamavathi	04:20
6	"Pranathosmi"	K. S. Chithra	Mayasri	04:55
7	"Ente Sindhoora Rekha"	K. J. Yesudas, K. S. Chithra	Hindolam	04:15
8	"Pranathosmi"	K. J. Yesudas	(Ragamalika: Reethigowla, Shree ranjani}	05:30
