= Pancharatna Kriti =

Set of five kritis in Carnatic classical music

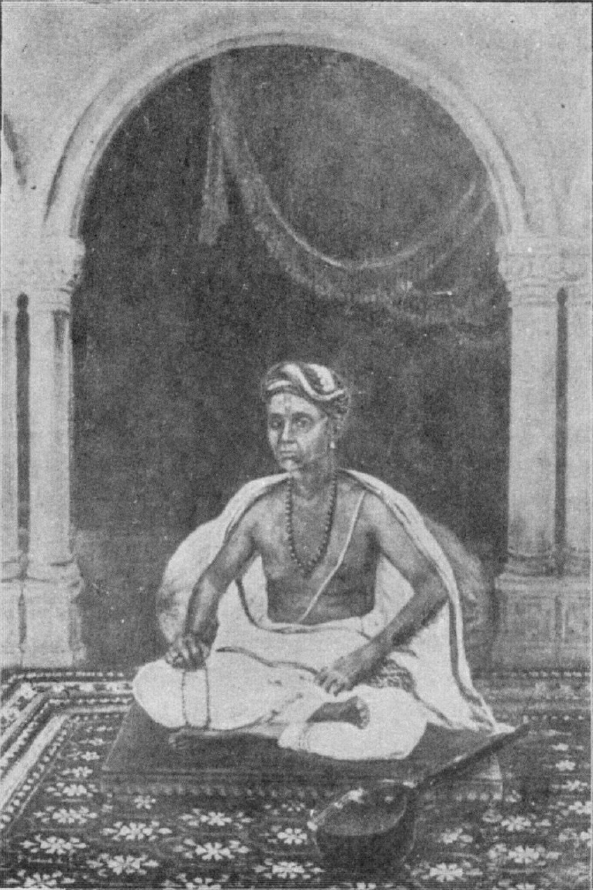
Saint Tyagaraja, who composed the Pancharatna Kriti

The Pancharatna kritis (transliterated as Pañcaratna kṛti) (Sanskrit: pancha "five" + ratna "gems") are a set of five kritis (songs) in Carnatic classical music, composed by the 18th-century Indian composer Tyagaraja. The first kriti is penned in Sanskrit while the other four kritis are penned in Telugu. The songs are: "Jagadananda karaka", "Dudukugala Nanne", "Sadhinchene", "Kanakana Ruchira" and "Endaro Mahanubhavulu".

== Tyagaraja and the Pancharatna Kritis ==
Tyagaraja lived in the late 18th century and early 19th century in Tiruvaiyaru in present-day Thanjavur district in Tamil Nadu. His compositions are considered to be some of the finest in Carnatic music. Of the five Pancharatna Kritis, four are in Telugu and one in Sanskrit. They are set to music in five ragas: Nata, Gaula, Arabhi, Varali and Sri.

== Composition ==
The Pancharatna kritis were written in praise of the Hindu deity Rama. They are set to Adi Tala and each raga represents the mood of the song and the meaning of its lyrics. All the kritis were composed in the style of a Ragam Tanam Pallavi (RTP) with the charanams (stanzas) substituting for the kalpana swaras (improvisatory passages) in the pallavi section of the RTP.

The Pancharatna Kritis are:

1. Jagadananda Karaka (Ragam Natai)
2. Duduku gala (Ragam Goula)
3. Sadhinchene (Ragam Arabhi)
4. Kanakana Ruchira (Ragam Varali)
5. Endaro Mahanubhavulu (Shree Ragam)

The melodic forms of these compositions (Nata, Goula, Arabhi, Varali, Sri) are the five Ghana ragas of Carnatic music, also called the ghanapanchaka. These five ragas lend themselves to elaborate improvisations. They are so called because they are suited for playing tanam on the veena. Nata and Varali are the most ancient of the Carnatic ragas and date back to over a thousand years ago.

== Lyrical synopsis ==
=== Jagadānanda kārakā ===
In this song, Tyagaraja praises Ramachandra, one of the incarnations of Lord Vishnu. He eulogizes Ramachandra as one who is the cause of all bliss in the universe. which was used in the court of the Maratha king Sarabhoji who ruled this area in the 18th century. Rama was Tyagaraja's favorite god. The kriti is set to Nata raga.

=== Duḍukugala nannē dora koḍuku brōchurā yentō ===
In this second Pancharatna Kriti composed in Telugu, Tyagaraja lists all the errors he has committed in his life and asks who but Rama could redeem such a sinner. The sins described include: just wandering around as though being satisfied with a full meal, giving sermons to people who are not interested in listening or who do not have the capability to understand, self-styling oneself as a great person, and mistaking the dross for the real thing. He lists four categories of people to whom he has made the claim of greatness; the ignorant, the riff-raff, the low social folk and women. In a play on words, he reproaches those who desire wives and progeny. The kriti is set to Gowla raga.

=== Sādhinchene ō manasā ===
This Pancharatna Kriti was composed in Telugu and has been set to Arabhi raga. It is written in a playful tone, rich with metaphor and simile without a surfeit of adjectives - all the while arresting the attention of the singers. In this kriti, Tyagaraja sings the greatness of the lord Krishna in a lucid manner. The style adopted in this kriti is very sweet in comparison with the other four.

=== Kana kana ruci rā kanaka vasana ninnu ===
This is the least sung or performed of the five Pancharatna Kritis composed in Telugu, but it is considered by some to be the most lingering and beautiful. It describes the divine beauty of Sri Rama, whom Tyagaraja worshiped. He says that the more he Tyagaraja looks upon His beautiful features, the more his mind is attracted to Him Sri Rama. This composition is rarely taught, and rarely heard in concerts, owing to the raga it is set to Varali raga.

=== Endarō mahānubhāvulu ===
Endarō mahānubhāvulu is believed to be one of the earlier kritis Tyagaraja composed in Telugu. The song is a salutation to and praise of all the great saints and musicians down the ages. Tyagaraja clearly delineates and lists the Mahanubhavalu, or great ones, in the kriti itself, mentioning the saints Narada and Saunaka, among others. In this kriti, Tyagaraja describes the greatness of devotees of the Lord. The belief in Kerala and Tamil Nadu is that Tyagaraja composed the kriti spontaneously in his joy upon hearing the divine music of the Malayali singer Shadkala Govinda Marar. But according to the Walajapet disciples' version of the origin of the kriti, it was composed and learned by Tyagaraja's disciples before the arrival of Marar. This, according to P. T. Narendra Menon, was the legendary, historically significant meeting between two great musicians. Since Endharo mahanubhavalu is said to have been composed by Tyagaraja at a young age, it is possible that after hearing Marar sing and in appreciation of the greatness of Marar, Tyagaraja could have asked his disciples to sing the kriti on this occasion. Humility is the foundation of all. The kriti is set to Shri raga

== Miscellaneous ==
M. S. Subbulakshmi, Semmangudi Srinivasa Iyer, Maharajapuram Santhanam, and Mangalampalli Balamuralikrishna are among the hundreds of great Indian classical vocalists who have brought these kritis closer to the modern world.
