= Chakkani Rajamargamu =

Chakkani Rājamargamu is a Telugu kriti in the Carnatic music tradition. It was composed by Tyāgarāja. It is composed in the Kharaharapriya rāga melodic mode, set to an Adi Tala rhythm. Like all other kritis of Thyagaraja, it carries his mudra. The song is about Thyagaraja's devotion to Lord Rama. This is considered as the most elaborate krithi composed in Kharaharapriya raaga, which contains all the special swara prayogams of the Kharaharapriya.
