= Chakra Tanam =

Singing style in the Carnatic tradition

Chakra Tanam (Sanskrit चक्र तानम्) is one of the styles of tanam singing in Carnatic Classical Music tradition. It owes its name to the circular or cyclic approach adopted by the performer.

Tanam singing itself is regarded as a dying art today with musicians not having the patience or the aptitude to take up such scholarly rigorous pursuits.

Subba Iyer of Chembai village (in Palakkad District), who lived in the early 19th Century and was a contemporary of the Carnatic Music Trinity and Maharaja Swathi Thirunal, was such a famed exponent of Chakra Tanam that he came to be popularly called Chakratanam Subba Iyer.

Chakra Tanam is an almost extinct style of Tanam singing, its last major exponent being Chembai Vaidyanatha Bhagavatar, the great-grandson of Chakratanam Subbaiyer. Another exponent of the style was Shadkala Govinda Marar, who was known as Chakra Tanam Govinda Maram because of his Tanam.
