= Hemavati =

Hemavati may refer to:

- Hemavati River, in Karnataka, India
- Hemavati (raga), a ragam (musical scale) in Carnatic music (South Indian classical music)
- Shailaputri, in Hinduism
