= S. Kalyanaraman =

Thanjavur S. Kalyanaraman

Background information
- Born: 2 June 1930
- Origin: Thanjavur Present day Mayiladuthurai district, Tamil Nadu, India
- Died: 9 January 1994 (aged 63)
- Genre: Carnatic music - Indian Classical Music
- Occupation: Singer
- Years active: 1949–1993

S. Kalyanaraman (2 June 1930 – 9 January 1994), popularly known as SKR, was a vocalist in the Carnatic tradition. Hailing from a musical family – his great-grandfather was Komal Muthu Bhagavathar and his grand uncle was vocalist Madirimangalam Natesa Iyer. S. Kalyanaraman became a disciple of G. N. Balasubramaniam and established himself as an original musician.

== Early life ==
S. Kalyanaraman was born in Thiruvengadu at his mother's residence near Mayavaram to N. Srinivasa Iyer. He was born in a well-to-do musical family and received his initial music training from his father. His father realized that Kalyanaraman needed guidance from a respected musician. At that time, the reigning superstar of Carnatic music was G. N. Balasubramaniam, better known as GNB. Kalyanaraman had sung in the GNB bani before becoming a disciple of Balasubramaniam. In Chennai, music teacher Kittamani Iyer identified Kalyanaraman's talents and introduced him to GNB. Upon realizing Kalyanaraman's potential, GNB took him under his wings and trained him for 15 years.

== Career ==
In less than a year of instruction under GNB, he was providing vocal support. GNB once remarked "What's there for me to teach, you are already singing so well."

Even before his debut in 1949, Kalyanaraman was already getting attention from the audience as GNB's vocal accompanist. At times, GNB would let him improvise during concerts.

GNB attended his debut in Gokhale Hall in 1949. GNB stated, "The best respect to a guru is to follow his style in total. The best tribute to a guru is to embellish a style of your own. My dear boy... I am proud you are... indeed your own." Once while listening to Kalyanaraman's rendition of "Nilayam Onru Enukku Arulvai", a Suddhananda Bharathi composition, GNB walked up to Kalyanaraman and demanded, "Teach me this and give me the notation." G.B. Duraiswamy (GNB's eldest son) used to remark: "The way he discussed intellectual queries and doubts with GNB was a treat to watch."

S. Kalyanaraman's rise in Carnatic music was phenomenal. Like his guru, he emphasized artistic individuality and won acclaim as a great artist. When performing with Hindustani musicians, he would apply a Hindustani touch when rendering Hindustani ragas. Such was his admiration of Indian music he saw more similarities than differences between Carnatic and Hindustani systems. He explained the gamaka technique in Carnatic music that most Hindustani musicians criticize as detrimental to shruthi clarity. He reached 'A' Top rank in All-India-Radio (AIR). In his later years, Kalyanaraman gave some whistle concerts.

== Style ==
He planned his solo concert items differently, often singing rare compositions with fewer popular numbers, specializing in vivadi (dissonant) ragas rarely attempted by popular musicians of his time and full of musical complexities. He became a specialist in vivadi ragas and popularized the Śruti bhedam technique (modal shift of tonic note) introduced by his guru. He used nadais (transposed rhythmic patterns) extensively and uninformed audience found his concerts challenging to understand and interpret. His renditions of vivadi ragas like Chandrajyothi, Sucharitra, Hamasanadam are beloved by the connoisseur and the informed audience for the musical weight Kalyanaraman's genius had given. The meme was "if it was easy, Kalyanaraman would not do it".

However, Kalyanaraman also popularized the GNB bani (style) of singing and immortalized his guru's hallmark ragas like Shanmukhapriya, Kalyani, Sankarabharanam, Kapi Narayani and many more. He gave Hindustani touches to Hindustani ragas like Dwijawanthi, Brindavana Saranga and Hamir Kalyani. He could match GNB's voice and could trick even the acute listener.

== Contributions ==
He notated a book, the first volume of GNB compositions with Trichur V. Ramachandran, which was released by GNB.

As a musical innovator he faced much criticism for creating new ragas such as the dwi-madhyama ragas in which he eschewed the panchama of the first 36 mela ragas substituting it with the prathi-madhyama. Apart from theoretically creating a set of 36 new ragas, he demonstrated them at a Music Academy lecture in 1993. He was scorned by critics that he could only handle the "rare stuff" of Carnatic music. He composed several varnams, krithis (some in ashtaragamalika format) and thillanas in both popular and vivadi ragas. Like his guru, he refrained from using a mudra.

He was a strict teacher and expected devotion to the art from his students, alienating many of them. Noted among his disciples are his wife Bhushany Kalyanaraman, Prof. Gowri Kuppuswamy, Brinda Venkataramanan and the popular playback singer Anuradha Sriram.

He emphasized shruthi clarity that he felt Carnatic musicians lacked, unlike their Hindustani counterparts. He formulated and tested methods to improve shruthi clarity in Carnatic musicians and innovative teaching methods. He planned a book with his findings, but it was never published.

== Legacy ==
Kalyanaraman's influence undeniably bore the GNB mudra. Though criticized many for his musical prowess, his renditions and contributions finally gained popularity among the younger generation. He is held in high regard by senior contemporaries such as T. N. Seshagopalan, Dr. M. Balamuralikrishna, M. S. Gopalakrishnan and Lalgudi Jayaraman, Kalyanaraman's contribution to Carnatic music is noteworthy.

The SKR Trust, established by his wife and student Smt Bhushany Kalyanaraman promotes his music and his legacy. A documentary of his life and work was released by Kalakendra Sanskriti Series The Sunaadha Vinodhan in a DVD format.
