= Endaro Mahanubhavulu =

Telugu kriti composed by Tyagaraja

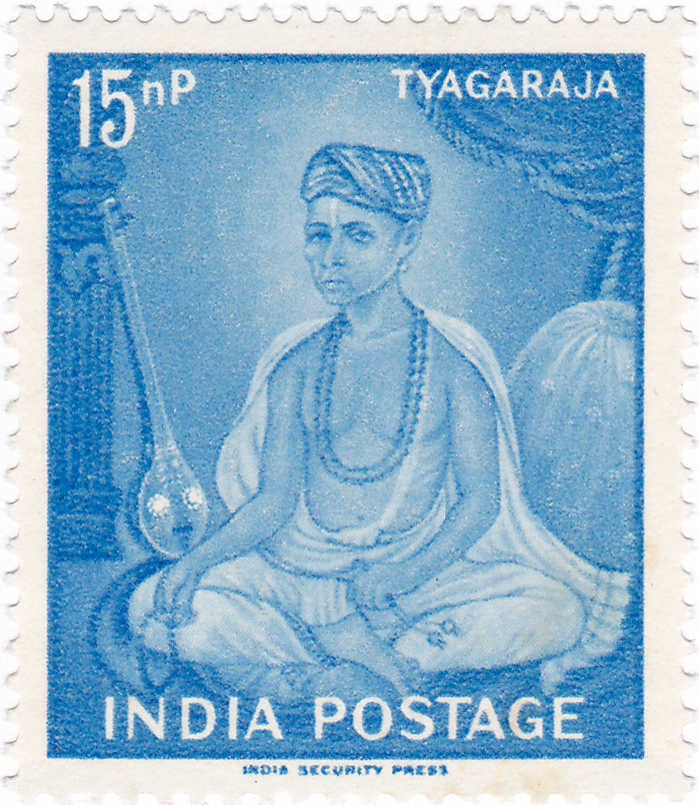
Endaro Mahanubhavulu was composed by Tyagaraja after an encounter with Govinda Marar, a highly skilled musician from Travancore

Endaro Mahanubhavulu is a popular kriti in Carnatic music composed by Tyagaraja, one of the Trinity of Carnatic music. Its lyrics are in Telugu; the music is set in the Sri Ragam and is in Aadi Talam. It is among the Pancharatna Kritis ("five gems") of Tyagaraja.

== Etymology ==
The word Mahānubhāvulu is made up of two words, mahát and anubhava. Mahát is a superlative term which means "great, important, high, eminent" and is related to the word mahadbhū which means "to become great or full (said of the moon)". The term anubhava refers to experience or knowledge derived from personal observation. Hence the word Mahānubhāvulu is referring to those devotees who have acquired extraordinary wisdom through their personal experiences. The word Endarō means "many persons". Thus, Endarō Mahānubhāvulu can be translated as "The great men who have attained dizzy heights in their spiritual experience and who have lived in all the ages".

== History ==
Endaro Mahanubhavulu was composed by Tyagaraja after an encounter with Govinda Marar, a highly skilled musician from Travancore (modern-day Kerala, India). One of Govinda's greatest musical feats was that he could effortlessly sing a pallavi in six kalas. As a result, he came to be known as 'Shatkala Govinda Marar'. In 1838, as the fame of Tyagaraja reached him, he decided to travel to Thiruvaiyaru to see him in person. He took with him two of his disciples, Nallathambi Mudaliyar and Vadivelu.

When he finally visited Tyagaraja's house, he found Tyagaraja sitting on a stone platform outside the house. Marar respectfully bowed to the great master and said "I have come seeking the privilege of listening to your celestial music. You should be pleased to confer it on me." Tyagaraja would never sing for the pleasure of strangers, without an inner urge. So he gave no response to the request. Vadivelu understood Tyagaraja's mind and asked him if he would at least listen to his master Marar sing. Tyagaraja glanced at Marar and condescendingly replied "What glorious music can this sick man offer? Let me see." Govinda Marar sang with his heart and soul, moving from raga to raga, overwhelming the audience with his singing. The performance conjured images of mighty musicians and artists in Tyagaraja's mind. That very moment the words of the renown song 'Endaro Mahanubhavulu' flowed from his lips. The song was a dedication to all the great maestros and performers. In this poem, Tyagaraja describes the greatness of devotees through the ages.

== Ragam ==
The kriti is set to Sri Ragam, which is a janya (derivative) of the 22nd melakarta, Kharaharapriya.

=== Scale ===
- Aarohanam : S R2 M1 P N2 S'
- Avarohanam : S' N2 P D2 N2 P M1 R2 G2 R2 S

== Lyrics, with meaning ==
=== Pallavi ===
Telugu:
ఎందరో మహానుభావులు అందరీకీ వందనములు
Transliteration:
Endarō mahānubhāvulu andarīki vandanamulu Endarō
Translation:
Salutations to all those great beings in this world

=== Anupallavi ===
Telugu:
చందురు వర్ణుని అందచందమును హృదయారవిందమున జూచి బ్రహ్మానందమనుభవించువా
Transliteration:
Chanduru varṇuni andachandamunu hr̥dayāravindamuna jūchi brahmānanda manubhavin̄chuvā
Transliteration:
Those beings will feel the moon-like beautiful form of God in their hearts and will be enlightened about it

=== Charanam ===
1 సామగానలోల మనసిజ లావణ్య ధన్యమూర్ధ న్యు ॥లెందరో॥
Sāma gāna lōla manasija lāvaṇya dhanya mūrdhanyu (endarō)
Those who worship you who is fond of chorus singing (sāma gāna)

2 మానసవనచర వరసంచారము నిలిపి మూర్తి బాగుగా పొడగనేవా ॥రెందరో॥
Mānasa vanacara vara sañchāramu nilipi mūrti bāguga poḍaganē vā (rendarō)
They control their mind and worship you who is as beautiful as Manmatha

3 సరగున బాదములకు స్వాంతమను సరోజమును సమర్పణము సేయువా ॥రెందరో॥
Saraguna pādamulaku swāntamanu sarōjamunu samarpaṇamu sēyuvā (rendarō)
They submit their hearts at your feet

4 పతితపావనుడనే పరాత్పరుని గురించి బరమార్థమగు నిజమార్గముతోను బాడుచును, సల్లాపముతో స్వరలయాది రాగముల తెలియువా ॥రెందరో॥
Patita pāvanuḍanē parātparuni guriñci paramārthamagu nija mārgamutōnu pāḍucunu sallāpamutō swara-layādi rāgamulu teliyuvā-(rendarō)
Oh! the protector of people they sing your praise with true devotion and they have good knowledge of swara, laya & raga

5 హరి గుణమణిమయ సరములు గళమున శోభిల్లు భక్తకోటు లిలలో తెలివితో చెలిమితో గరుణగల్గి జగమెల్లను సుధాదృష్టిచే బ్రోచువా ॥రెందరో॥
Hariguṇa maṇimaya saramulu gaḷamuna śōbhillu bhakta kōṭulilalō telivitō celimitō karuṇa galgi jagamellanu sudhā dṛṣṭicē brōcu vā-(rendarō)
They wear garlands made of gems that represent the quality of Hari and with mercy they see the whole world with love & affection

6 హోయలుమీఱ నడులుగల్గు సరసుని సదా గనుల జూచుచును, పులకశరీరులయి ఆనంద పయోధి నిమగ్నులయి ముదంబునను యశముగలవా ॥రెందరో॥
Hoyalu mīra naḍalu galgu sarasuni sadā kanula jūcucunu pulaka śarīrulai yānanda payōdhi nimagnulai mudambunanu yaśamu galavā (rendarō)

They are so happy to see the beautiful gait of the Divine everyday and they are happy about it

7 పరమభాగవత మౌనివరశశివిభాకర సనక సనందన దిగీశ సురకింపురుష కనక కశిపుసుత నారద తుంబురు పవనసూను బాలచంద్రధర శుకసరోజభవ భూసురవరులు పరమపావనులు ఘనులు శాశ్వతులు కమలభవసుఖము సదానుభవులుగాక ॥రెందరో॥
Parama bhāgavata mauni varaśaśi vibhākara sanaka sanandana digīśa sura kimpuruṣa kanaka-kaśipu suta nārada tumburu pavana-sūnu bhālachandra-dhara shuka sarōja-bhava bhūsura varulu parama pāvanulu ghanulu śāśvatulu kamalabhava sukhamu sadānubhavulu gāka (yendarō)

Surya, Chandra, Sanaka Sanandanas, Dikpalas, Devas, Kimpurushas, Prahalada, Narada, Tumburu, Anjaneya, Siva, Shuka, Brahma, Brahmanas enjoy the Brahmanandha Swaroopa of God always. Apart from them there are others and salutations to them also

8 నీ మేను నామ వైభవమ్ములను నీ పరాక్రమ ధైర్యముల శాంత మా నసము నీవులను వచన సత్యమును రఘువర నీయెడ సద్భక్తియు జనించకను దుర్మతములను కల్ల జేసినట్టి నీమది నెఱింగి సతతంబునను గుణభజనానంద కీర్తనము జేయువా ॥రెందరో॥
Nī mēnu nāma vaibhavambulanu nī parākrama dhairyamula śānta mānasamu nīvulanu vacana satyamunu raghuvara nīyeḍa sadbhaktiyu janiñcakanu durmatamulanu kalla jēsinaṭṭi nī madineriṅgi santasambunanu guṇa bhajanānanda kīrtanamu sēyuvā (rendarō)

They praise your form, name, valour, bravery, peaceful heart, true words. You destroy all bad thoughts that prevent people from praying to you, they know that and they praise your qualities

9 భాగవత రామాయణ గీతాది శ్రుతిశాస్త్ర పురాణపు మర్మములన్ శివాది షణ్మతముల గూఢముల ముప్పదిముక్కోటి సురాంత రంగముల భావముల నెఱిగి భావరాగ లయాది సౌఖ్యముచే జిరాయువుల్ గలిగి నిరవధి సుఖాత్ములై త్యాగరాజాప్తులైనవా ॥రెందరో॥
Bhāgavata rāmāyaṇa gītādi śruti śāstra purāṇapu marmamulanu śivādi ṣaṇmatamula gūḍhamulanu muppadi mukkōṭi surāntaraṅgamula bhāvambula- neriṅgi bhāva rāga layādi saukhyamucē chirāyuvul kalgi niravadhi sukhātmulai tyāgarājāptulaina-vā (rendarō)

Those who know the secret of Bhagavata, Ramayana, Gita, Sruti, Shastras, Puranas (epics), various religious thoughts, the thoughts of the 33 types of Devas, bhava, raga, tala and they have a long life and enjoy all good things

10 ప్రేమ ముప్పిరిగొను వేళ నామము దలచేవారు రామభక్తుడైన త్యాగరాజ నుతుని నిజదాసులైనవా ॥రెందరో॥
Prēma muppiri konu vēḷa nāmamu talacē vāru5 rāma bhaktuḍaina tyāga- rāja nutuni nija dāsulaina vā (rendarō) prēma muppirigonu vēḷa nāmamunu dalacēvāru

Those beloved of the Lord of Tyagaraja, when bhakti increases, they think of your name, they are Rama bhaktas, they are devotees of the Lord of Tyagaraja who worships you

== In popular culture ==
The pallavi and anupallavi of this Song were used in the Malayalam Film, Devadoothan, Music by Vidhyasagar, this song became a Cult Classic among the people.

It is featured in the Malayalam rap single ‘Mahanubhavulu’ by Fejo (rapper).
