= Shadkala Govinda Marar =

Indian singer (1798–1843)

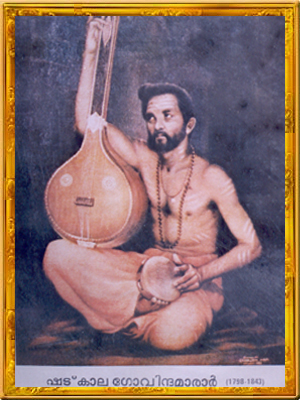
Portrait of Shadkala Govinda Marar by Raja Ravi Varma

Govinda Mārār (1798–1843), or Ṣaṭkāla Govinda Mārār was a Carnatic musician from Kerala, India. He was a contemporary of Tyāgarāja and Swathi Thirunal Rama Varma. He was also adept in playing musical instruments like Chenda, Edakka and Thimila. His expertise in singing in the six degrees of geometric speed earned him the title Ṣaṭkāla. By legend, Endaro Mahanubhavulu, one of Thyagaraja's most famous compositions, was composed after he heard Marar sing. He is said to have used a Tamburu having seven strings

== Early life ==
Govinda Marar was born in 1798 at Ramamangalam, a village in Ernakulam district,Kerala. His parents belonged to the community of Marars who performed the traditional singing in the temples of Kerala. He took to singing from a very early age. He received his musical lessons from Haripad Ramaswamy Bhagavathar.

He is said to have used a Tamburu having seven strings.
