= Reetigowla =

Janya raga of Carnatic music

- Arohanam: S G₂ R₂ G₂ M₁ N₂ D₂ M₁ N₂ N₂ Ṡ
- Avarohanam: Ṡ N₂ D₂ M₁ G₂ M₁ P M₁ G₂ R₂ S

Reethigowla, Reethi Gowla or Reethigowlai is a janya raga in carnatic music. It is associated with 22nd melakarta raga Kharaharapriya.

It is Vakra Shadava-Sampoorna (Zig-zag raga with six notes in Arohana and seven in Avarohana). It is a Rakthi Ragam with unique and melodious Sancharams and Prayogams. This Raga invokes Bhakti mixed with immense joy through a Vadi-Samvadi relationship between many of its swaras such as Sa-Ma, Ri-Dha and Ga-Ni. It is also classified as a "rakti" raga (a raga of high melodic content). In the Muthuswami Dikshitar school, it is a melakarta known as Nārīrītigowla.

== Arohana and Avarohana ==
- ārohaṇa : S G₂ R₂ G₂ M₁ N₂ D₂ M₁ N₂ N₂ Ṡ (Note: Alternate notations: Hindustani: S G̱ R G̱ M Ṉ D M Ṉ Ṉ Ṡ; Western: C E♭ D E♭ F B♭ A F B♭ B♭ C)
- avarohaṇa : Ṡ N₂ D₂ M₁ G₂ M₁ P M₁ G₂ R₂ S (Note: Alternate notations: Hindustani: Ṡ Ṉ D M G̱ M P M G̱ R S; Western: C B♭ A F E♭ F G F E♭ D C)

Shri Nilotpala Nayike, Reethigowlai, rendered on the Veena by L Ramakishnan

Nārīrītigowla is the 20th Melakarta in the original list compiled by Venkatamakhin. The scales have vakra prayoga (zig-zag usage of notes in the ascending and descending scale).

- ārohaṇa: S G₂ R₂ G₂ M₁ N₂ D₁ M₁ N₂ N₂ Ṡ
- avarohaṇa: Ṡ N₂ D₁ M₁ G₂ M₁ P M₁ G₂ R₂ S

== Compositions ==
Badalika Deera - Tyagaraja

Nanu Vidachi - Tyagaraja

Chera Raavade - Tyagaraja

Janani Ninnuvina - Subbaraya Sastri

Paripaalaya Maam - Swathi Thirunal

Tatwamariya Tharama - Papanasam Sivan

Guruvaayur Appane - Ambujam Krishna

Garudaadri Vedaadri - Annamacharya

== Film Songs ==
=== Tamil Language Songs ===
Song	Movie	Composer	Singer
Thenavan Thaai Naatu	Tenali Raman	Viswanathan–Ramamoorthy	P. Susheela
Chinna Kannan Azhaikiran	Kavikuyil	Ilayaraja	M. Balamuralikrishna, S. Janaki
Thalayai Kuniyum Thamaraye	Oru Odai Nadhiyagirathu	Ilayaraja	S. P. Balasubrahmanyam, M. S. Rajeswari
Meetatha Oru Veenai	Poonthottam	Ilayaraja	Hariharan, Mahalakshmi Iyer
Raman Kathai Kelungal	Sippikul Muthu	Ilayaraja	S. P. Balasubrahmanyam, S.P. Sailaja
Azhagana rakshasiye	Mudhalvan	A. R. Rahman	S. P. Balasubrahmanyam, Harini
Sudum Nilavu	Thambi	Vidyasagar	P. Unnikrishnan, Harini
Theenda Theenda (Section A only remaining in Raga Sriranjani)	Thulluvadho Ilamai	Yuvan Shankar Raja	P. Unnikrishnan, Bombay Jayashree
Vaalibaa Vaa Vaa	Goa	Yuvan Shankar Raja	Ilayaraja, S. P. Balasubrahmanyam & K.S. Chitra
Kangal Irandaal	Subramaniyapuram	James Vasanthan	Belly Raj, Deepa Miriam
Kanava Ninaiva	Aasal	Bharadwaj	V. V. Prasanna, Manjari
Solla Solla Ullamengum	Athithi	Bharadwaj	V. V. Prasanna, Shweta Mohan
Kaadhal Neruppin	Veyil	G. V. Prakash Kumar	Karthik, Chinmayi, Nidheesh Gopalan
Mugalineme	Amirtham	Bhavatharini	Sujatha
Enadhu Ulagil	Kadavul Paathi Mirugam Paathi	Rahul Raj	Gayathri Suresh
Karthigai Thirunaal	Shree	T. S. Muralidharan	Ilaiyaraja, Bhavatharini
Ragasiyam(Album song)	Isai Ennum Puthumozhi	M.R.Raheis	V. V. Prasanna, Manjari
Ennai Ennai Theendum	Vetri Selvan	Mani Sharma	Haricharan, Mahathi
Yaar Ezhuthiyatho	Thegidi	Nivas K. Prasanna	Sathya Prakash
Oru chinna Paravai	Azhagiya Kanne	N. R. Raghunanthan	G. V. Prakash Kumar,Priyanka NK
Ilaveyil	Maraikkayar: Arabikadalin Singam	Ronnie Raphael	Sathya Prakash, Chinmayi
Vazhithunaiye	Dragon	Leon James	Sid Sriram,Sanjana Kalamanje

=== Malayalam Language Songs ===
Song	Movie	Composer	Singer
Kandu Njan Mizhikalil	Abhimanyu	Raveendran Master	M._G._Sreekumar
Jeevaamshamaayi	Theevandi	Kailas menon	KS Harisankar, Shreya Ghoshal
Kungumanira Sooriyan	Neeyum Njanum	Vinu Thomas	Shreya Ghoshal
Onnaam Ragam Paadi	Thoovanathumbikal	Perumbavoor G. Raveendranath	K.S.Chitra, G.Venugopal
Praṇato'smi Guruvāyupureśam (in Sanskrit)	Sindoora Rekha	Sharreth	K. J. Yesudas
Ritha Dhamava	Mangalyam Thanthunanena	Joel Johns	Bhoomee & Joel Johns

=== Kannada Language Songs ===
Song	Movie	Composer	Singer
Nimma Maguvu Naguthiruva	Gauri Ganesha	Rajan–Nagendra	Puttur Narasimha Nayak
