= Bhupalam =

Janya raga of Carnatic music

- Arohanam: S R₁ G₂ P D₁ Ṡ
- Avarohanam: Ṡ D₁ P G₂ R₁ S

Bhupalam (pronounced bhūpalam) is a rāgam in Carnatic music (musical scale of South Indian classical music). It is a pentatonic scale (audava rāgam or owdava rāgam). It is a janya rāgam (derived scale), as it does not have all the seven swaras (musical notes). It is also written as Bhoopalam.

It is considered an auspicious scale and a morning rāgam. In Tamil music, this scale is called Puranirmai pann and some thevarams are set to this scale. It is also used for chanting slokas, folks songs, Kathakali music and other rituals. The equivalent scale in Hindustani music is Bhupal Todi.

== Structure and Lakshana ==
Bhupalam scale with shadjam at C

Bhupalam is a symmetric rāgam that does not contain, madhyamam or nishādham. It is a symmetric pentatonic scale (audava-audava ragam in Carnatic music classification – audava meaning 'of 5'). Its ascending and descending scale (ārohaṇa-avarohaṇa structure) is as follows:

- ārohaṇa : S R₁ G₂ P D₁ Ṡ (Note: Alternate notations: Hindustani: S Ṟ G̱ P Ḏ Ṡ; Western: C D♭ E♭ G A♭ C)
- avarohaṇa : Ṡ D₁ P G₂ R₁ S (Note: Alternate notations: Hindustani: Ṡ Ḏ P G̱ Ṟ S; Western: C A♭ G E♭ D♭ C)

The notes used in this scale are shadjam, shuddha rishabham, sadharna gandharam, panchamam and shuddha dhaivatham, as per Carnatic music notation and terms for the swaras. Bhupalam is considered a janya rāgam of Shubhapantuvarali, the 45th Melakarta rāgam, though it can be derived from 5 other melakarta rāgams by dropping both the madhyamam and nishādham.

== Related rāgams ==
- Revagupti rāgam differs from Bhupalam only by the gāndhāram. It uses antara gāndhāram instead of sadharana gāndhāram and its ārohaṇa-avarohaṇa structure is S R1 G3 P D1 S : S D1 P G3 R1 S
- Bhauli rāgam uses an additional nishadam in descending scale, in comparison to Revagupti above. Its ārohaṇa-avarohaṇa structure is S R1 G3 P D1 S : S N3 D1 P G3 R1 S
