= Upanishad Brahmayogin =

Upanishad Brahmayogin is the cognomen of Rāmachandrendra Sarasvati (fl. 1800 CE), a sannyasin and Advaitin scholar of the Upanishads. He is credited with having written commentaries on all 108 Upanishads of the Muktika canon. His works have been translated and published by the Adyar Library.

He was born Śivarāma of Vādhūla gotra in Brahmapuram, a village on the river Palar. This would date to the middle of the 18th century, based on tales of his association, as an older contemporary, with Tyagaraja (1767–1847 CE).

He was initiated into Sannyasa by Vasudevendra Sarasvati in Kanchipuram, where he settled down, and eventually founded a matha of his own, the Upanishad Brahmendra matham. His initiation name was Rāmachandrendra, but he came to be known for his scholarship by names such as Upanishad-brahma-yogi, Upanishad-brahmendra and Upanishad-brahman.

His commentaries on all 108 Upanishads of the Muktika canon were the fulfilment of a wish of his father Śivakāmeśvara. Besides these, he was also the author of independent works such as the Paramādvaita-siddhānta-paribhāṣā and the Upeya-nāma-viveka. A prolific author, he annotated the colophons of each of his works with the number of granthas contained in it, presumably to prevent interpolation. On this basis, his works amount to over 45,000 granthas.

His samadhi is located on the banks of the Sarva Teertham tank in Kanchipuram along with 4 other Samadhis.

== Sources ==
- Rao, Saligrama Krishna Ramachandra (1983). The Tantra of Śrī-chakra. Bangalore: Sharada Prakashana.
- Raghavan, Venkatarama (1994). Jackson, William J. (ed.). The Power of the Sacred Name: V. Raghavan's Studies in Nāmasiddhānta and Indian Culture. Studies in Indian tradition. Vol. 4. Sri Satguru Publications. ISBN 978-81-7030-395-4.
- Saraswathy, Ananthan-Devendra (2006). Saintly Steerers of the Ship of Brahmadvaita of the Upanishads. Read Books. ISBN 978-1-4067-0155-5.
