= Mayamalavagowla =

Fifteenth raga in the melakarta

- Arohanam: S R₁ G₃ M₁ P D₁ N₃ Ṡ
- Avarohanam: Ṡ N₃ D₁ P M₁ G₃ R₁ S
- Equivalent: Double harmonic scale
- Similar: Bhairav (Hindustani classical raga)

Mayamalavagowla (pronounced māyāmāḻavagauḻa) is a raga of Carnatic music (musical scale of South Indian classical music). It is classified as 15th melakarta raga under Venkatamakhin's melakarta system. Originally known as malavagowla, "maya" was prefixed to it after the advent of the scheme of the 72 melas. The number 15 was assigned to it following the Katapayadi sankhya system. This is a morning raga.

== Structure and Lakshana ==
Mayamalavagowla scale with shadjam at C

Venkatamakhin defines its lakshana thus:

pūrṇō māḻavagouḻākhyaḥ sa grahō gīyatē sadā

Mayamalavagowla is the 3rd raga in the 3rd chakra, Agni. Its mnemonic name is Agni-Go. Its mnemonic phrase is sa ra gu ma pa dha nu. Its ārohaṇa-avarohaṇa structure is as follows, but instead of labeling the 3 Ga-s and the 3 Ni-s using {1,2,3}, some authors have used {0,1,2} instead. (see swaras in Carnatic music for details on below notation and terms):

- ārohaṇa: S R₁ G₃ M₁ P D₁ N₃ Ṡ (Note: Alternate notations: Hindustani: S Ṟ G M P Ḏ N Ṡ; Western: C D♭ E F G A♭ B C)
- avarohaṇa: Ṡ N₃ D₁ P M₁ G₃ R₁ S (Note: Alternate notations: Hindustani: Ṡ N Ḏ P M G Ṟ S; Western: C B A♭ G F E D♭ C)

The notes in this raga are ṣaḍjam, śuddha r̥ṣabham, antara gāndhāram, śuddha madhyamam, pañcamam, śuddha dhaivatam and kākalī niṣādam. As it is a mēḷakarttā rāgam, by definition it is a sampurna rāgam (has all seven notes in ascending and descending scale). It is the śuddha madhyamam equivalent of Kamavardhini (also known as Pantuvarāḷi), which is the 51st in the mēḷakarttā scale.

The gamakas in the raga are unique in that conversely to the G-M relationship in Śankarābharaṇaṃ, G is sung in oscillation (M,G M,G M,G) while M is held constant. There is no bold M-P gamaka as in Śankarābharaṇaṃ as well. R and D are also usually sung in oscillation with S and P respectively, making the only constant notes S, M, and P. Of course, these rules are occasionally broken for effect (e.g., holding N flat before ascending to S).

== Nature of raga ==
This auspicious raga evokes śānta (peace) rasa and pathos. It creates a soothing effect, suitable to sing at all times, particularly, the first prātaḥ-sandhyā-kālaṃ (dawn). It is commonly used for beginners' lessons such as Sarali Varisais or Sarala Svarās (Kannada), etc. Since it eschews vivadi swaras (relatively discordant notes), has a uniform distance between svara sthānas (relative position of notes) and has symmetry, they are easier to learn. It is an ancient rāgam.

It is a Sampurna raga. Also, it is a sarva svara gamaka vārika rakti rāga. It has a large number of janya ragas (derived scales) assigned to it. This rāgam corresponds to Bhairav in Hindustani music. It is called as a "rakti" raga because of its high melodic content.

It is also defined as a mūrcana kāraka méLa since it can be used for Graha bhedam on madhyamam and rishabham to result in Simhendramadhyamam and Rasikapriya respectively. Graha bhedam is the step taken in keeping the relative note frequencies same, while shifting the Shruti (or drone) to another note in the rāgam. For further details and an illustration refer Graha bhedam on Māyamālavagowla.

== Janya ragams ==
Mayamalavagowla has quite a few janya ragams associated with it, of which Bowli, Jaganmohini, Gowla, Gowlipantu, Lalita, Nadanamakriya, Revagupti, Saveri and Malahari are quite well known. See List of janya Ragas for a full list of janyas.

== Popular compositions ==
This raga has also been very popularly used in film music. Numerous well recognized songs have been set in this raga. Ilayaraja has composed many hit songs in this raga.
