= Varali =

Janya raga of Carnatic music

- Arohanam: S G₁ R₁ G₁ M₂ P D₁ N₃ Ṡ
- Avarohanam: Ṡ N₃ D₁ P M₂ G₁ R₁ S

Varali or Varaali (pronounced varāḷi) is a rāgam in Carnatic music (musical scale of South Indian classical music). It is classified either as the 39th mela kartha raga or as a janya rāgam (derived scale) of the 39th melakarta scale Jhalavarali. Even though it is a mela kartha, the scale is most often rendered with a vakra scale (zig-zag notes) in the ascending scale.

It is a vivadi rāgam. It is the 4th in the list of 5 Ghana rāgams (Natta, Gaula, Arabhi and Shree being the others). In olden times, this rāgam was called Varati, and is said to be more than 1300 years old. It is with this name that it is referred in old musical texts like Sangita Makarandha and Sangita Ratnakara.

== Structure and Lakshana ==
Varali is an asymmetric rāgam due to the vakra prayoga in ascending scale. It is a vakra-sampurna-sampurna rāgam (sampurna meaning containing all 7 notes). Its ārohaṇa-avarohaṇa structure (ascending and descending scale) is as follows:

- ārohaṇa : S G₁ R₁ G₁ M₂ P D₁ N₃ Ṡ (Note: Alternate notations: Hindustani: S R Ṟ R M̄ P Ḏ N Ṡ; Western: C E D♭ E F♯ G A♭ B C)
- avarohaṇa : Ṡ N₃ D₁ P M₂ G₁ R₁ S (Note: Alternate notations: Hindustani: Ṡ N Ḏ P M̄ R Ṟ S; Western: C B A♭ G F♯ E D♭ C)

The notes used in this scale are shadjam, shuddha rishabham, shuddha gandharam, prati madhyamam, panchamam, shuddha dhaivatam and kakali nishadham. The madhyamam used is said to be slightly higher than the prati madhyamam, and is also called as chyuta panchama madhyamam (also referred as Varali madhyamam). For the details of the notations and terms, see swaras in Carnatic music. Some also believe that it can be sung as S R1 G1, and this phrase also appears in many compositions, Kanakanaruchira being one of the most popular.

== Belief ==
It is believed that Varali, when taught directly by a teacher to a student, will strain their relationship or could cause ill effects to one or the other. The ragam is said to be learnt by listening and self-learning.
