= Revagupti =

Janya raga of Carnatic music

- Arohanam: S R₁ G₃ P D₁ Ṡ
- Avarohanam: Ṡ D₁ P G₃ R₁ S

Revagupti (pronounced rēvagupti) is a rāgam in Carnatic music (musical scale of South Indian classical music). It is a pentatonic scale (audava rāgam or owdava rāgam). It is a janya rāgam (derived scale), as it does not have all the seven swaras (musical notes).

It is a morning rāgam. The similar scales in Hindustani music are Rewa and Bibhas.

== Structure and Lakshana ==
Revagupti scale with shadjam at C

Revagupti is a symmetric rāgam that does not contain madhyamam or nishādham. It is a symmetric pentatonic scale (audava-audava ragam in Carnatic music classification – audava meaning 'of 5'). Its ascending and descending scale (ārohaṇa-avarohaṇa structure) is as follows:

- ārohaṇa : S R₁ G₃ P D₁ Ṡ (Note: Alternate notations: Hindustani: S Ṟ G P Ḏ Ṡ; Western: C D♭ E G A♭ C)
- avarohaṇa : Ṡ D₁ P G₃ R₁ S (Note: Alternate notations: Hindustani: Ṡ Ḏ P G Ṟ S; Western: C A♭ G E D♭ C)

The notes used in this scale are shadjam, shuddha rishabham, antara gandharam, panchamam and shuddha dhaivatham, as per Carnatic music notation and terms for the swaras. Revagupti is considered a janya rāgam of Mayamalavagowla, the 15th Melakarta rāgam, though it can be derived from 5 other melakarta rāgams by dropping both the madhyamam and nishādham.

== Related rāgams ==
- Bhupalam rāgam differs from Revagupti only by the gāndhāram. It uses sadharana gāndhāram instead of antara gāndhāram and its ārohaṇa-avarohaṇa structure is S R1 G2 P D1 S : S D1 P G2 R1 S
- Bhauli rāgam uses an additional nishadam in descending scale, in comparison to Revagupti. Its ārohaṇa-avarohaṇa structure is S R1 G3 P D1 S : S N3 D1 P G3 R1 S
- Karnataka Shuddha Saveri rāgam uses shuddha madhyamam in place of antara gandharam of Revagupti. Its ārohaṇa-avarohaṇa structure is S R1 M1 P D1 S : S D1 P M1 R1 S
