= Sogasu jūḍa taramā =

Musical composition

Sogasu jūḍa taramā is a popular Telugu composition of Tyagaraja Swamy in Raga kannaḍa Gauḷa.

== Lyric and meaning ==
The form of Sogasu jūḍa taramā consists of traditional Carnatic sections, with the meanings in the table below.

Lyrics and meaning of Sogasu jūḍa taramā, by section
Section	Lyric	Meaning	Telugu lyric
Pallavi	sogasu jūḍa taramā nī sogasu jūḍa taramā	Is it possible to see anywhere such comeliness as that of Yours?	సొగసు జూడ తరమా నీ సొగసు జూడ తరమా
Anupallavi	niga-nigamanucu kapōla yugamucē merayu mōmu - (sogasu)	Is it possible to see anywhere such comeliness of shining face with a pair gleaming cheeks?	నిగ-నిగమనుచు కపోలయుగముచే మెరయు మోము
Charanam 1	amarārcita pada yugamu - abhaya prada kara yugamu kamanīya tanu nindita - kāma kāma ripu nuta nī - (sogasu)	The feet worshiped by the celestial; the hands that bestow freedom from fear; lovable body that puts to shame the cupid; O Lord praised by Lord Siva – the enemy of cupid! is it possible to see anywhere such comeliness as that of Yours?	అమరార్చిత పదయుగమో- అభయప్రద కరయుగమో కమనీయ తనునిన్దిత - కామ కామ రిపు నుత నీ - (సొగసు)
Charanam 2	vara bimba samādharamu - vakuḷa sumambulayuramu kara dhṛta śara kōdaṇḍa marakatāṅga varamaina - (sogasu)	The lips resembling the beautiful (red) Bimba fruit; the chest adorned with flowers of Vakula tree; the hands that wield arrows and bow Kodanda; O Lord with sapphire hued body? Is it possible to see anywhere such exquisite comeliness?	వరబిమ్బ సమాధరమో - వకుళ సుమమ్బులయురమో కర ధృత శర కోదణ్డ మరకతాఙ్గ వరమైన - (సొగసు)
Charanam 3	ciru nagavulu muṅgurulu - mari kannula tēṭa vara tyāgarāja vandanīyayiṭuvaṇṭi-(sogasu)	Is that the smile!; Or the curls of hair! (falling on forehead); Or those pristine of eyes!; O Sacred worship worthy Lord of Tyagaraja! is it possible to see anywhere such comeliness?	చిరు నగవో ముఙ్గురులో - మరి కన్నుల తేటో వర త్యాగరాజ వందనీయయిటువంటి- (సొగసు)

== Common variations ==
- pada yugamu, kara yugamu, adharamu, uramu, nagavulu, muṅgurulu, tēṭa - pada yugamō, kara yugamō, adharamō, uramō, navvō, muṅgurulō, tēṭō
- tyāgarāja vandanīya – tyāgarājārcita vandanīya

== See also ==
- Tyagaraja swamy
- List of Carnatic composers
