= Andolika =

Janya raga of Carnatic music

- Arohanam: S R₂ M₁ P N₂ S
- Avarohanam: S N₂ D₂ M₁ R₂ S

Andolika is a Carnatic raga, which is also sometimes written as Andholika. This raga is a janya of the 22nd Melakarta raga Kharaharapriya.

Ascending scale with C as Shadjam (tonic note), which is exactly same as Madhyamavati scale

== Structure and Lakshana ==
Descending scale has D2 in place of P

This ragam is an asymmetric scale and is classified as an audava-audava ragam (five notes in the ascending and descending scale).

- ārohaṇa: S R₂ M₁ P N₂ S (Note: Alternate notations: Hindustani: S R M P Ṉ S; Western: C D F G B♭ C)
- avarohaṇa: S N₂ D₂ M₁ R₂ S (Note: Alternate notations: Hindustani: S Ṉ D M R S; Western: C B♭ A F D C)

The notes in this scale are chatushruti rishabham, shuddha madhyamam, panchamam, kaisiki nishadham in arohana and additional chatushruti dhaivatam in avarohanam, in place of panchamam (see pictures). The avarohanam is Panchama Varjam. From Kharaharapriya scale (22nd melakarta), the gandharam is removed in this scale and the rest are used in asymmetrical manner. Since gandharam is removed this scale can also be considered a janya of 28th mela Harikambhoji scale, but since 22 comes ahead many prefer to use the association with Kharaharapriya.
