= Ennu Ninte Moideen (soundtrack) =

- Album cover for Ennu Ninte Moideen

Soundtrack album by M. Jayachandran, Ramesh Narayan, Gopi Sundar
- Released: 29 August 2015
- Recorded: 2014–2015
- Genre: Feature film soundtrack
- Length: 33:16
- Language: Malayalam
- Label: Satyam Audios
- Producer: M. Jayachandran; Ramesh Narayan; Gopi Sundar

M. Jayachandran chronology
Nirnayakam (2015)	Ennu Ninte Moideen (2015)	Mohavalayam (2016)

Ramesh Narayan chronology
Alif (2015)	Ennu Ninte Moideen (2015)	Edavappathy (2016)

Gopi Sundar chronology
Bhale Bhale Magadivoy (2015)	Ennu Ninte Moideen (2015)	Charlie (2015)

Ennu Ninte Moideen is the soundtrack to the 2015 film of the same name directed by R. S. Vimal. Based on the real life story of B. P. Moideen and Kanchanamala which happened in Mukkam, Kozhikode in the 1960s, the film starred Prithviraj Sukumaran and Parvathy Thiruvothu as the principal characters. M. Jayachandran, Ramesh Narayan and Gopi Sundar composed the 10-song soundtrack, the latter of whom also composed the background score. Satyam Audios released the soundtrack on 29 August 2015.

== Background ==
The film's soundtrack featured 10 songs—Gopi Sundar who composed the background score had also composed the track "Mukkathe Penne", M. Jayachandran composed three tracks: "Kathirunnu", "Kannondu Chollanu" and "Iruvanji Puzhappenne", while Ramesh Narayan composed the remainder of it.

Sundar was initially assigned to be sole composer working on the songs as well as the score. But since he was composing on the background score for Bangalore Days, he could not accept another project. When Vimal approached him again, he saw the initial rushes which he liked intending him to contribute his part for the film. The track "Mukkathe Penne" was composed within five minutes as Sundar was working on the background score and Vimal requested for a song to be used in the background. He had a tune in mind which he hummed to Mohammed Maqbool Mansoor (one of the singer's backing vocalists whom he helped with the Sufi notes) at the studio at that time. Later, Mansoor wrote the lyrics and provided vocals for the song. For the background score, he used a bamboo saxophone and a veena.

Upon Prithviraj's request, Jayachandran had composed three songs for the film, recalled that Kanchanamala's real-life story served as his inspiration for the compositions. The song "Kathirunnu" was recorded in July 2014 with Shreya Ghoshal. While working on the film, Jayachandran felt "deeply emotional" after the demise of his father and that sorrow served as an outlet for the song, which had "churned out of his heart".

== Track listing ==
No.	Title	Singer(s)	Lyricist	Music	Length
1	"Ee Mazhathan (Solo)"	K. J. Yesudas	Rafeeq Ahamed	Ramesh Narayan	4:07
2	"Kannondu Chollanu"	Shreya Ghoshal, Vijay Yesudas	Rafeeq Ahamed	M. Jayachandran	4:51
3	"Kathirunnu"	Shreya Ghoshal	Rafeeq Ahamed	M. Jayachandran	4:18
4	"Sharadambaram (Duet)"	P. Jayachandran, Shilpa Raj	Changampuzha Krishna Pillai	Ramesh Narayan	2:38
5	"Iruvanji Puzhappenne"	M. Jayachandran	Rafeeq Ahamed	M. Jayachandran	4:14
6	"Priyamullavane"	Madhushree Narayan	Rafeeq Ahamed	Ramesh Narayan	3:27
7	"Mukkathe Penne"	Gopi Sundar, Mohammed Maqbool Mansoor	Mohammed Maqbool Mansoor	Gopi Sundar	4:15
8	"Sharadambaram (Solo)"	Shilpa Raj	Changampuzha Krishna Pillai	Ramesh Narayan	2:39
9	"Ee Mazhathan (Duet)"	K. J. Yesudas, Sujatha Mohan	Rafeeq Ahamed	Ramesh Narayan	4:07
10	"Sharadambaram (Unplugged)"	P. Jayachandran, Sithara	Changampuzha Krishna Pillai	Ramesh Narayan	2:39

== Reception ==
Vipin Nair of Music Aloud rated 8.5/10 to the album, calling it as a "nice, melody-oriented soundtrack" reminiscent of yesteryear Malayalam films and ranked Gopi Sundar's composition "Mukkathe Penne" as the best from the album over Jayachandran and Ramesh Narayan's works. Karthik Srinivasan of Milliblog described it as a "highly melodious offering from Jayachandran and Ramesh Narayan". G. Ragesh of Manorama Online wrote "While the romantic song 'Kannondu Chollanu' is already a hit, the musical version of a Changampuzha [Krishna Pillai] poem is likely to find a place in the hit chart soon. M. Jayachandran and Pandit Ramesh Narayan along with their singers deserve a share of the credit for conveying the feel of the film so brilliantly."

Gokul Nair of Film Companion South wrote "The musical trinity, comprising M. Jayachandran, Gopi Sunder, and Ramesh Narayan, has composed an excellent soundtrack that accentuates the beauty and pathos of Kanchana and Moideen's doomed love story. Shreya Ghoshal's melodious voice in 'Kathirunnu' (a song that speaks for the entire film) helps us to embrace and remember the moving aspects of this romantic tragedy." S. Shivakumar of The Hindu while describing the songs being "soulful" and "melodious", he also praised the background score as it "complements the mood of each sequence".

== Accolades ==
Award	Date of ceremony	Category	Recipient(s) and nominee(s)	Result	Ref.
Asianet Film Awards	7 February 2016	Best Lyricist	Rafeeq Ahamed – ("Kathirunnu")	Won	
Asiavision Awards	2 December 2015	Best Playback Singer – Female	Shreya Ghoshal – ("Kathirunnu")	Nominated	
Asiavision Awards	2 December 2015	Best Background Score	Gopi Sundar	Won	
Asiavision Awards	2 December 2015	Most Popular Music Director	Gopi Sundar	Won	
Asiavision Awards	2 December 2015	New Sensation in Singing	Mohammed Maqbool Mansoor – ("Mukkathe Penne")	Won	
Filmfare Awards South	18 June 2016	Best Music Director	M. Jayachandran	Won	
Filmfare Awards South	18 June 2016	Best Lyricist	Rafeeq Ahamed – ("Kathirunnu")	Won	
Filmfare Awards South	18 June 2016	Best Playback Singer – Female	Shreya Ghoshal – ("Kathirunnu")	Won	
IIFA Utsavam	24–25 January 2016	Best Music Direction	Ramesh Narayan; M. Jayachandran; Gopi Sundar	Nominated	
IIFA Utsavam	24–25 January 2016	Best Lyricist	Mohammed Maqbool Mansoor – ("Mukkathe Penne")	Nominated	
IIFA Utsavam	24–25 January 2016	Best Lyricist	Rafeeq Ahamed – ("Kathirunnu")	Nominated	
IIFA Utsavam	24–25 January 2016	Best Playback Singer – Male	Mohammed Maqbool Mansoor – ("Mukkathe Penne")	Nominated	
IIFA Utsavam	24–25 January 2016	Best Playback Singer – Male	Vijay Yesudas – ("Kannondu Chollanu")	Nominated	
IIFA Utsavam	24–25 January 2016	Best Playback Singer – Female	Shreya Ghoshal – ("Kathirunnu")	Won	
Kerala State Film Awards	1 March 2016	Best Music Director – Songs	Ramesh Narayan	Won	
Kerala State Film Awards	1 March 2016	Best Singer – Male	P. Jayachandran – ("Saradambaram") (Note: also for "Njanoru Malayali" from Jilebi and "Malarvaka Kombathu" from Ennum Eppozhum)	Won	
Kerala State Film Awards	1 March 2016	Best Lyricist	Rafeeq Ahamed – ("Kathirunnu")	Won	
National Film Awards	28 March 2016	Best Music Director	M. Jayachandran	Won	
South Indian International Movie Awards	30 June–1 July 2016	Best Music Director	M. Jayachandran	Nominated	
South Indian International Movie Awards	30 June–1 July 2016	Best Lyricist	Rafeeq Ahamed – ("Kathirunnu")	Nominated	
South Indian International Movie Awards	30 June–1 July 2016	Best Playback Singer – Female	Shreya Ghoshal – ("Kathirunnu")	Nominated	
Vanitha Film Awards	16 February 2016	Best Lyricist	Rafeeq Ahamed – ("Kathirunnu")	Won	

== Controversy ==
After Narayan's win at the Kerala State Film Award for Best Music Director, he accused Vimal and Prithviraj condemning his attempts to exclude some of his songs for the film. Narayan said that, apart from "Ee Mazhathan" he had recorded two more songs with K. J. Yesudas, but those were omitted at the last minute which left Yesudas disheartened. He also said that there were attempts to exclude the song "Sharadambaram" that was sung by P. Jayachandran for the film, which was unsuccessful. Prithviraj responded to Narayan's claims, saying that problem is mostly with Vimal and Narayan, and he had no role in it.

At a press meet in Chennai, following Jayachandran's win for National Film Award for Best Music Direction, he cleared the controversies regarding credit for the music. He said that Narayan had compose three songs with two of them being included, and Jayachandran's compositions had also been included, but he said to Prithviraj that he would score the film, only if Narayan permits to do so. Jayachandran also recalled that Narayan had left the project owing to creative differences, despite composing most of the songs and has been unaware of such instances happened. Expressing his gratitude to Prithviraj on giving the freedom he required, Jayachandran claimed that the contribution of the three composers "brought musical images that were as beautiful as those a single music director would have created".
