= Marar =

Marar may refer to:

- Marar (tribe), a tribe of the United Arab Emirates (UAE)
- Marar (caste), a Hindu Ambalavasi caste in Kerala, India
- Marar, Ramgarh, a town in Jharkhand, India
