= Hemavati (raga) =

58th raga in the Melakarta

- Arohanam: S R₂ G₂ M₂ P D₂ N₂ Ṡ
- Avarohanam: Ṡ N₂ D₂ P M₂ G₂ R₂ S
- Equivalent: Nikriz

Hemavati (pronounced hēmavati) is a ragam in Carnatic music (musical scale of South Indian classical music). It is the 58th Melakarta rāgam in the 72 melakarta rāgam system of Carnatic music. The Shuddha Madhyamam (M₁) equivalent of this raga is Kharaharapriya.

It is called Simhāravam or Deshi Simhāravam in Muthuswami Dikshitar school of Carnatic music. It is beloved especially of nadaswaram vidwans. It is said to be borrowed into Hindustani music from Carnatic music, especially with instrumentalists.

== Structure and Lakshana ==
Hemavati scale with Shadjam at C

Hemavati is the 4th rāgam in the 10th chakra Disi. The mnemonic name is Disi-Bhu. The mnemonic phrase is sa ri gi mi pa dhi ni. Its ārohaṇa-avarohaṇa structure (ascending and descending scale) is as follows (see swaras in Carnatic music for details on below notation and terms):

- ārohaṇa: S R₂ G₂ M₂ P D₂ N₂ Ṡ (Note: Alternate notations: Hindustani: S R G̱ M̄ P D Ṉ Ṡ; Western: C D E♭ F♯ G A B♭ C)
- avarohaṇa: Ṡ N₂ D₂ P M₂ G₂ R₂ S (Note: Alternate notations: Hindustani: Ṡ Ṉ D P M̄ G̱ R S; Western: C B♭ A G F♯ E♭ D C)

As it is a melakarta rāgam, by definition it is a sampoorna rāgam (has all seven notes in ascending and descending scale). It is the prati madhyamam equivalent of Kharaharapriya, which is the 22nd melakarta.
