= Dwi-Madhyama Panchama Varja Ragas =

Dwi-Madhyama Panchama Varja ragas is a melakarta scheme of Carnatic music of South India, mentioned in the Ashtotharasata (108) mela scheme. In this scheme the regular 72 mela ragas are expanded to 108, by including the possible 36 vikritha panchama melas. The 36 additional melakartas take both the madhyamas and do not have the panchama, in which the prathi madhyama is sung in place of panchama.

== Origins ==
S. Kalyanaraman, popularly known as SKR, was a legendary vocalist in the Carnatic tradition. Hailing from a famed musical family, where his great-grandfather was Komal Muthu Bhagavathar and his grand uncle was the celebrated vocalist Madirimangalam Natesa Iyer, S. Kalyanaraman became one of the foremost disciples of G. N. Balasubramaniam and established himself as an original musician in his own right. Kalyanaraman's music undeniably bore the GNB mudra.

Later Kalyanaraman ventured deeper into the scales and came up with the 36 Dwi madhyama panchama varja ragams.

== Example ==
For example, the scale of Mayamalavagowla is

- Arohana : S R1 G3 M1 P D1 N3 S
- Avarohana : S N3 D1 P M1 G3 R1 S

The equivalent raga in the additional 36 ragas is Mayasri's, the scale for which is

- Arohana : S R1 G3 M1 M2 D1 N3 S
- Avarohana : S N3 D1 M2 M1 G3 R1 S

In the above example, the Panchama (P) is replaced by prati madhyama (M2).

== Extended ragas ==
The name of the mela can be easily found by looking at the first word. All these ragas have the suffix "Sri". Likewise, the scale for all the 36 ragas can be easily derived.

Nomenclature given by Tanjavur S. Kalyanaraman is as follows :

1. Kanakangi – Kanagasri
2. Rathnangi – Rathnasri
3. Ganamurthy – Ganasri
4. Vanaspathy – Vanasri
5. Manavathi – Manasri
6. Thanarupi – Thanasri
7. Senavati – Sunadhasri
8. Hanuma Thodi – Hanumasri
9. Dhenuka – Dhensri
10. Natakapriya – Natakasri
11. Kokilapriya – Kokilasri
12. Roopavathi – Roopasri
13. Gayakapriya – Gayakasri
14. Vakulabharanam – Vakulasri
15. Mayamalavagowla – Mayasri
16. Chakravakam – Chakrasri
17. Suryakantham – Suryasri
18. Hatakambari – Hatasri
19. Jhankaradhwani – Jhankarasri
20. Natabhairavi – Natasri
21. Kiravani – Kiranasri
22. Kharaharapriya – Kharasri
23. Gowrimanohari – Gowrisri
24. VarunaPriya – Varunasri
25. Mararanjani – Marasri
26. Charukesi – Charusri
27. Sarasangi – Sarasri
28. Harikamboji – Harisri
29. Dheerasankarabharanam – Dheerasri
30. Naganandhani – Nagasri
31. Yagapriya – Yagasri
32. Raghavardhani – Raghasri
33. Gangeyabooshani – Gangasri
34. Vaghadheeswari – Vaghasri
35. Sulini—Sulinisri
36. Chalanata – Chalasri
