= Ahiri =

Janya raga of Carnatic music

- Arohanam: S R₁ M₁ G₃ M₁ P D₁ N₂ Ṡ
- Avarohanam: S R₁ S G₃ M₁ P D₁ N₂ Ṡ

Ahiri (pronounced āhiri) is a rāgam in Carnatic music. It is a janya rāgam (derived scale), and associated with the 14th melakarta scale Vakulabharanam. It has also been associated with the 8th melakarta scale Hanumatodi. Though it has all the seven swaras (musical notes) in the ascending and descending scale, the presence of zig-zag notes (vakra swaras) makes it a janya rāgam.

Ahiri is an ancient rāgam mentioned in Sangita Makarandha and Sangita samayasara. It is a difficult rāgam to master, but it is rewarding. The rāgam is synonymous with karuna rasa (compassion). It is considered an early-morning scale.

== Structure and Lakshana ==
Ahiri is an asymmetric rāgam which has vakra swaras (zig-zag notes) in the ascending scale. It is a sampurna rāgam (containing all 7 notes). Several ārohaṇa-avarohaṇa structures (ascending and descending scale) are assigned due to the usage of foreign notes (bhashanga prayogas):

- ārohaṇa : S R₁ M₁ G₃ M₁ P D₁ N₂ Ṡ (Note: Alternate notations: Hindustani: S Ṟ M G M P Ḏ Ṉ Ṡ; Western: C D♭ F E F G A♭ B♭ C) (also S R₁ S G₃ M₁ P D₁ N₂ Ṡ (Note: Alternate notations: Hindustani: S Ṟ S G M P Ḏ Ṉ Ṡ; Western: C D♭ C E F G A♭ B♭ C))
- avarohaṇa : Ṡ N₂ D₁ P M₁ G₃ R₁ S (Note: Alternate notations: Hindustani: Ṡ Ṉ Ḏ P M G Ṟ S; Western: C B♭ A♭ G F E D♭ C)

The notes used in this scale are shadjam, shuddha rishabham, antara gandharam, shuddha madhyamam, panchamam, shuddha dhaivatam and kaisiki nishadham in the scale. For the details of the notations and terms, see swaras in Carnatic music.

Since there is additional usage of external (foreign) notes, in comparison to its parent scale, it is considered a bhashanga rāgam. Notes Ri, Ga, Dha and Ni which are different from the parent scale are used in this scale and is considered to have lot of subtle srutis.
