= Asaveri =

Janya raga of Carnatic music

- Arohanam: S R₁ M₁ P D₁ S
- Avarohanam: S N₂ S P D₁ M₁ P R₂ G₂ R₁ S

Asaveri (asāvēri) is a rāgam in Carnatic music (musical scale of South Indian classical music). It is a janya rāgam (derived scale) from the 8th melakarta scale Hanumatodi. It is a janya scale, as it does not have all the seven swaras (musical notes) in the ascending scale, and has a vakra (zigzag) descending scale.

It is a bhaashaanga ragam, as its avarohanam contains chatushruti rishabham, a swaram foreign to the parent scale of Todi. Asaveri is an ancient rāgam, which is mentioned in the Sangita Ratnakara. Asaveri resembles Komal Asavari and Asa Todi of Hindustani classical music. The Asavari of Hindustani music resembles Natabhairavi of Carnatic music.

== Structure and Lakshana ==
Ascending scale with shadjam at C, which is same as Karnataka Shuddha Saveri scale

Descending scale with shadjam at C, which is based on Hanumatodi scale

Asaveri is an asymmetric, bhashaga rāgam (has foreign notes) that does not contain gandharam and nishadam in the ascending scale. It is an audava-vakra-sampurna rāgam (or owdava rāgam, meaning pentatonic ascending scale). Its ārohaṇa-avarohaṇa structure (ascending and descending scale) is as follows:

- ārohaṇa : S R₁ M₁ P D₁ S (Note: Alternate notations: Hindustani: S Ṟ M P Ḏ S; Western: C D♭ F G A♭ C)
- avarohaṇa : S N₂ S P D₁ M₁ P R₂ G₂ R₁ S (Note: Alternate notations: Hindustani: S Ṉ S P Ḏ M P R G̱ Ṟ S; Western: C B♭ C G A♭ F G D E♭ D♭ C)

The notes used in this scale are shadjam, shuddha rishabham, shuddha madhyamam, panchamam and shuddha dhaivatam in ascending scale, with kaisiki nishadham, sadharana gandharam and "chatushruti rishabham" included in descending scale. For the details of the notations and terms, see swaras in Carnatic music.

The Anya swarams are Chaturshruti Rishabham *R₂ / Shuddha gandharam *G₁ and Chaturshruti dhaivatam *D₂ / Shuddha nishadam *N₁.In veena, the Anya swarams are played from shuddha gandharam G₁ and shuddha nishadam N₁
