= Vivadi =

Concept in Hindustani classical music

- Stylistic origins: Carnatic music, Hindustani classical music
- Cultural origins: India
- Typical instruments: Voice, Veena, Mridangam, Sitar, Tabla

Subgenres
- Vivadi swaram, Vivadi ragam, Vivadi melakarta

Other topics
- Raga, Swaram, Melakarta, Frisson, Dissonance

In Hindustani classical music, vivadi (Sanskrit: विवादि meaning "dissonant") refers to pitches that are not part of the arohana or avrohana of a given raga. In general, vivadi are not to be played during an improvisation on a given raga. So, for instance, if a raga had the structure S R G m P D N S', S' N D P m G R S; in that case, r, g, M, d and n would all be vivadi. Although vivadi pitches are generally to be avoided during the playing of a given raga, they are occasionally added by skilled performers in order to introduce some color to an interpretation.

== In Carnatic music ==
In Carnatic music, vivadi is used in vivadi swaram, vivadi dhosha, vivadi ragam, and by extension vivadi melakarta. Vivadi term means going against the grain of thought or approach.

=== Vivadi swaram ===
A swaram is said to be vivadi in relationship with another swaram. There are twelve swarams in Indian classical music. But there are 16 notes. Thus some notes occupy the same frequencies.

=== Vivadi ragam ===
A ragam is vivadi if it contains vivadi swarams, especially with the vadi swaram of the ragam (vadi swaram means important swaram for that ragam or scale).

The ragam still is a valid scale and compositions are made using such ragams too. Examples of popular Vivadi ragas are : Nata, Varali, Vagadheeswari.

=== Vivadi melakarta ===
A Melakarta ragam is vivadi if it contains vivadi swarams. 40 of the 72 Melakarta ragams have vivadi swaras.

=== Vivadi dosha ===
Dosha means negative effect. Vivadi ragams are said to have vivadi dosha, which can be overcome by singing the vivadi swarams in certain phrases that are said to reduce the negative effect.

== See also ==
- Vadi (music)
- Samvadi
