= Kharaharapriya =

22nd Melakartha

- Arohanam: S R₂ G₂ M₁ P D₂ N₂ Ṡ
- Avarohanam: Ṡ N₂ D₂ P M₁ G₂ R₂ S
- Equivalent: Dorian mode Kafi Thaat

Kharaharapriya is a rāga in Carnatic music. It is the 22nd melakarta rāga (parent scale) in the 72 melakarta rāga system. It is possible that the name of the ragam was originally Harapriya but it was changed to conform to the Katapayadi formula. Kharaharapriya has a distinct melody and brings out the Karuna rasam, invoking pathos in the listeners. The Kafi thaat of Hindustani music is the equivalent of Kharaharapriya. Its Western equivalent is the Dorian mode. The Prati Madhyamam (M₂) equivalent of this raga is Hemavati

== Etymology ==
There are many theories behind the etymology of the name Kharaharapriya. One of the most popular beliefs is that the ragam was initially called Samaganam and when Ravana was trapped by Shiva, under the kailash hill trying to lift it, it is believed that, to appease the lord, Ravana sang many hymns in praise of the lord, but his heart cooled only when a hymn was sung in the ragam and hence the name (hara) shiva and (priya) loved hence "Harapriya " – The one dear to Shiva, and to fit it in the Katapayadi system according to the melakarta chakra system.

The word Kharaharapriya may also mean the beloved of the killer of the Khara demon (Khara – Khara demon, Hara – Defeater/Killer, Priya – Beloved). The story of Rama killing the Khara demon is narrated in the 28th, 29th and the 30th sub-chapter of the Aranya Khanda of Ramayana.

== Structure and Lakshana ==
Kharaharapriya scale with shadjam at C

It is 4th rāga in the 4th chakra Veda. The mnemonic name is Veda-Bhu. The mnemonic phrase is sa ri gi ma pa dhi ni. Its ārohaṇa-avarohaṇa structure is as follows (see swaras in Carnatic music for details on below notation and terms):

- ārohaṇa : S R₂ G₂ M₁ P D₂ N₂ Ṡ (Note: Alternate notations: Hindustani: S R G̱ M P D Ṉ Ṡ; Western: C D E♭ F G A B♭ C)
- avarohaṇa : Ṡ N₂ D₂ P M₁ G₂ R₂ S (Note: Alternate notations: Hindustani: Ṡ Ṉ D P M G̱ R S; Western: C B♭ A G F E♭ D C)

The notes are chatushruti rishabham, sadharana gandharam, shuddha madhyamam, chatushruti dhaivatam and kaisiki Nishadam. It is a sampoorna rāgam – scale having all 7 swarams. It is the shuddha madhyamam equivalent of Hemavati, which is the 58th melakarta scale. Since the swaras of Kharaharapriya are quite evenly spaced, and since several different types of gamakas are allowed, it is a very versatile, fluid and flexible rāgam that allows for elaborate melodic improvisation within its scale.

Songs sung in Kharaharapriya ragas typically have long, elaborate ālapanās, which exhibit the fluidity of the rāgam. Kharaharapriya songs are usually meant to be sung slow, medium or medium-fast, in order to bring out the Karuna rasa and bhava of the song.

== Janya rāgams ==
Due to the even spacing of swaras, many janya rāgams (derived scales) are associated with Kharaharapriya. It is one of the melakarta scales that has a large number of janya rāgams. Many of the janya rāgams are very popular on their own, lending themselves to elaboration and interpretation. Some of them are Abheri, Abhogi, Andolika, Bhimplaas (Hindustani music), Brindavana Saranga, Kāpi, Madhyamavati, Megh (Hindustani music), Mukhari, Reetigowla, Shree, Dhanashree, Udayaravichandrika, and Sriranjani.

See List of janya rāgams for full list of scales associated with Kharaharapriya.

== Compositions ==
Kharaharapriya has been decorated with compositions by many composers. The ragam is most closely associated with Thyagaraja who has pioneered in composing many songs in this rāgam, that have become popular and well known. Both Muthuswami Dikshitar and Shyama Sastri however, have not composed kritis in 'Kharaharapriya'

== Film Compositions ==
=== Language:Tamil ===
| Song | Movie/Album | Composer | Singer |
|---|---|---|---|
| Enna Seidhaalum | Irumbu Thirai | S. V. Venkatraman | Radha Jayalakshmi |
| Ariyaa Paruvamadaa | Missiamma | S. Rajeshwara Rao | P. Susheela |
| Inbam Perinbam | Rani Lalithangi | G. Ramanathan | P. Bhanumathi |
| Maayavalaiyil | Gulebakavali | Viswanathan–Ramamoorthy | T. M. Soundararajan |
| Annan Kaatiya Vazhiyamma | Padithal Mattum Podhuma | Viswanathan–Ramamoorthy | T. M. Soundararajan |
| Valarntha Kalai | Kathiruntha Kangal | Viswanathan–Ramamoorthy | P. B. Sreenivas, P. Susheela |
| Maharajan | Karnan | Viswanathan–Ramamoorthy | T. M. Soundararajan, P. Susheela |
| Aagaya Pandhalile | Ponnunjal | M. S. Viswanathan | T. M. Soundararajan, P. Susheela |
| Madhavi Pon Mayilaal | Iru Malargal | M. S. Viswanathan | T. M. Soundararajan |
| Ponmagal Vandhaal | Sorgam | M. S. Viswanathan | T. M. Soundararajan |
| Attamenna Solladi (I will sing for you) | Manidharil Manikkam | M. S. Viswanathan | T. M. Soundararajan |
| Malligai En Mannan | Dheerga Sumangali | M. S. Viswanathan | Vani Jayaram |
| Sippi Irukkuthu | Varumayin Niram Sivappu | M. S. Viswanathan | S. P. Balasubrahmanyam, S. Janaki |
| Aayiram Nilave Vaa | Adimai Penn | K. V. Mahadevan | S. P. Balasubrahmanyam, P. Susheela |
| Isaiyai Thamizhai | Agathiyar | Kunnakudi Vaidyanathan | Sirkazhi Govindarajan, T. R. Mahalingam |
| Poo Malarinthida | Tik Tik Tik | Ilaiyaraaja | K. J. Yesudas, Jency Anthony |
| Thaana Vantha Santhaname | Ooru Vittu Ooru Vanthu | Ilaiyaraaja | S. P. Balasubrahmanyam, S. Janaki |
| Vaazhavaikum Kaathalukku Jey | Apoorva Sagodharargal | Ilaiyaraaja | S. P. Balasubrahmanyam, S. Janaki |
| Pallikoodam Pogalama | Koyil Kaalai | Ilaiyaraaja | S. P. Balasubrahmanyam, S. Janaki |
| Mappillaikku | Netrikkan | Ilaiyaraaja | Malaysia Vasudevan, P. Susheela |
| Dheiveega Raagam | Ullasa Paravaigal | Ilaiyaraaja | Jensy, Vani Jairam |
| Kannukkulle Yaaro | Kai Kodukkum Kai | Ilaiyaraaja | S. P. Sailaja, P. Susheela |
| Maalai Karukkalil | Neethiyin Marupakkam | Ilaiyaraaja | K. J. Yesudas, S. Janaki |
| Roja Poo Adivanthathu | Agni Natchathiram | Ilaiyaraaja | S. Janaki |
| Karutha Machan | Pudhu Nellu Pudhu Naathu | Ilaiyaraaja | S. Janaki |
| Iravu Nilavu | Anjali | Ilaiyaraaja | S. Janaki |
| Kaala kaalamaaga Vaazhum | Punnagai Mannan | Ilaiyaraaja | S. P. Balasubrahmanyam, K.S. Chitra |
| Deviye Naan Saranam | Thanga Thamaraigal | Ilaiyaraaja | S. P. Balasubrahmanyam, K.S. Chitra |
| Aethamayya Aetham | Ninaive Oru Sangeetham | Ilaiyaraaja | Malaysia Vasudevan, K.S. Chitra |
| Ilam Vayasu Ponna | Paandi Nattu Thangam | Ilaiyaraaja | Malaysia Vasudevan, K.S. Chitra |
| Nethu Oruthara Oruthara | Puthu Paatu | Ilaiyaraaja | Ilaiyaraaja, K.S. Chitra |
| Poongatru Thirumbuma | Muthal Mariyathai | Ilaiyaraaja | Malaysia Vasudevan, S. Janaki |
| Anandham Pongida Pongida | Sirai Paravai | Ilaiyaraaja | K. J. Yesudas, Sunanda |
| Thooliyile Ada Vantha | Chinna Thambi | Ilaiyaraaja | Mano, K.S. Chitra |
| Unnai Vaazhtha Vanthen | Unnai Vaazhthi Paadugiren | Ilaiyaraaja | K. J. Yesudas |
| Elangaathu Veesudhey | Pithamagan | Ilaiyaraaja | Sriram Parthasarathy, Shreya Ghoshal |
| Kai Veesi | Nandalala | Ilaiyaraaja | Vijay Yesudas, Swetha Mohan, Madhu Balakrishnan, Raagul, Chandrasekar |
| Ilavenirkala Panjami | Manam Virumbuthe Unnai | Ilaiyaraaja | Hariharan |
| Thavikkiren Thavikkiren | Time | Ilaiyaraaja | Hariharan, Bhavatharini |
| Aanenna Pennena | Dharma Durai | Ilaiyaraaja | S. P. Balasubrahmanyam |
| Neela Vana Odayil | Vazhvey Maayam | Gangai Amaran | S. P. Balasubrahmanyam |
| Indralogathu Sundari | Uyirullavarai Usha | T. Rajendar | S. P. Balasubrahmanyam |
| Janaki Devi | Samsaram Adhu Minsaram | Shankar–Ganesh | K.S. Chitra |
| Rendu Kannam Santhana Kinnam | Sivappu Malli | Shankar–Ganesh | K. J. Yesudas, P. Susheela |
| Panivilum Paruvanila | Paneer Nadhigal | Shankar–Ganesh | K. J. Yesudas |
| Panju Mittai Selakatti | Ettupatti Rasa | Deva | Malaysia Vasudevan, S. Janaki |
| Un Uthattora | Panchalankurichi | Deva | Hariharan, Anuradha Sriram |
| Karuvella Kaatukkulae | Porkkaalam | Deva | Sujatha Mohan, Anuradha Sriram, Arunmozhi |
| Atho Vanile Nila Oorvalam | Thandanai | Chandrabose | S. P. Balasubrahmanyam, S. Janaki |
| Kakki Sattai Potta Machan | Sankar Guru | Chandrabose | Malaysia Vasudevan, S. P. Sailaja |
| Pachchai Nirame (Sakiye) | Alaipayuthey | A. R. Rahman | Hariharan, Clinton Cerejo |
| Malarodu Malaringu | Bombay | A. R. Rahman | Sujatha Mohan, Anuradha Sriram & Chorus |
| Gulmohar Malare | Majunu | Harris Jayaraj | Hariharan |
| Mudhal Mazhai | Bheemaa | Harris Jayaraj | Hariharan, Mahathi, R. Prasanna |
| Hasili Fisiliye | Aadhavan | Harris Jayaraj | Karthik, Harini, Dr Burn & Maya |
| Ivan Yaaro | Minnale | Harris Jayaraj | P. Unni Krishnan, Harini |
| Suttum Vizhi | Ghajini | Harris Jayaraj | Sriram Parthasarathy, Bombay Jayashree |
| Oru Maalai | Ghajini | Harris Jayaraj | Karthik |
| Yaaridamum | Thotti Jaya | Harris Jayaraj | Ramesh Vinayagam, Harini |
| Uyirile | Vettaiyaadu Vilaiyaadu | Harris Jayaraj | Mahalakshmi Iyer, Srinivas |
| Silu Silu Siluvena | Kovil | Harris Jayaraj | Tippu |
| Meela Mudiyamal(Album song) | Isai Ennum Puthumozhi | M.R.Raheis | Benny Dayal, Srimathumitha, Rathika |
| Sangeetha Swarangal | Azhagan | Maragathamani | S. P. Balasubrahmanyam, Sandhya |
| Kamban Engu | Jaathi Malli | Maragathamani | S. P. Balasubrahmanyam, K.S. Chitra |
| Rosappu Chinna Rosappu | Suryavamsam | S. A. Rajkumar | Hariharan(vers 1), Sujatha Mohan(vers 2) |
| Edho Oru Paattu | Unnidathil Ennai Koduthen | S. A. Rajkumar | Hariharan(vers 1), Sujatha Mohan(vers 2) |
| Kanava Ninaiva | Aasal | Bharadwaj | V. V. Prasanna, Manjari |
| Santhikkadha Kangalil Inbangal | 180 | Sharreth | Unni Menon, K.S. Chitra, S. Sowmya |
| En Raasi | Enakkoru Magan Pirappan | Karthik Raja | Sujatha Mohan, P. Unni Krishnan |
| Konjum Manjal | Ullaasam | Karthik Raja | Hariharan, Harini |
| Ennamma Devi Jakkamma | Thambi | Vidyasagar | Karthik, Manikka Vinayagam, Balesh |
| Inni Naanum Naanilai | Yai! Nee Romba Azhaga Irukke! | Srinivas | Srinivas, Sujatha Mohan, Sunitha Sarathy |
| Yamini Yamini | Yai! Nee Romba Azhaga Irukke! | Arvind-Shankar | Harish Raghavendra |
| Aathadi Manasudhan | Kazhugu | Yuvan Shankar Raja | Priya Himesh, Karthik Raja |
| Ayyayyo | Paruthiveeran | Yuvan Shankar Raja | Shreya Ghoshal, Krishnaraj, Manikka Vinayagam, Yuvan Shankar Raja(Humming) |
| Dheivangal Ellam | Kedi Billa Killadi Ranga | Yuvan Shankar Raja | Vijay Yesudas |
| Kadhal Vaithu | Deepavali | Yuvan Shankar Raja | Vijay Yesudas |
| Dhavanipotta Deepavali | Sandakozhi | Yuvan Shankar Raja | Vijay Yesudas, Shreya Ghoshal |
| Thaaliyae Thevaiyillai | Thaamirabharani | Yuvan Shankar Raja | Hariharan, Bhavatharini |
| Endhan Uyir Thozhiyae | Winner | Yuvan Shankar Raja | Udit Narayan |
| Aedho Saigirai | Vaamanan | Yuvan Shankar Raja | Javed Ali, Sowmya Raoh |
| Ayyayo Nenju | Aadukalam | G. V. Prakash Kumar | S. P. Balasubrahmanyam, S. P. B. Charan, Prashanthini |
| Un Mela Oru Kannu | Rajinimurugan | D. Imman | Jithin Raj, Mahalakshmi Iyer |
| Muzhumadhi Muzhumadhi | Kanimozhi | Satish Chakravarthy | Vijay Yesudas, Bela Shende |
| Ithanai Dhooram | Koottam | James Vasanthan | Haricharan, Shweta Mohan |
| Vinmeen Vithaiyil | Thegidi | Nivas K. Prasanna | Abhay Jodhpurkar, Saindhavi |
| Kalla Payalae Payalae | Mosakutty | Ramesh Vinayakam | Shreya Ghoshal, Haricharan |
| Yaarukkum Sollama | All in All Azhagu Raja | Thaman S | Rahul Nambiar |
| Ara Kirukan | Vengayam | Bharani | Sujith, Srimathumitha |
| Bodhai Kaname | Oh Manapenne! | Vishal Chandrashekhar | Shashaa Tirupati, Anirudh Ravichander |

=== Janya 1:Ragam Karnaranjani Tamil ===
- ārohaṇa : S R₂ G₂ M₁ G₂ P D₂ Ṡ
- avarohaṇa : Ṡ N₂ D₂ P M₁ G₂ R₂ S

| Song | Movie | Composer | Singer |
|---|---|---|---|
| Ponmagal Vandhal(in Charanam portion) | Sorgam | M. S. Viswanathan | T. M. Soundararajan |
| Megame Megame | Palaivana Solai | Shankar–Ganesh | Vani Jairam |
| Theertha Karaithaniley | Thai Pongal | Ilaiyaraaja | K.J. Yesudas, Jency Anthony |
| Aalolam Paadum | Sirayil Pootha Chinna Malar | Ilaiyaraaja | Mano, S. Janaki |
| Naan Paadum Mouna Raagam | Idaya Kovil | Ilaiyaraaja | S. P. Balasubrahmanyam |
| Ilamai Enum Poongaatru | Pagalil Oru Iravu | Ilaiyaraaja | S. P. Balasubrahmanyam |
| Mani Thooral | Maathangal Ezhu | Vidyasagar | S. P. Balasubrahmanyam |
| Ragam Pudhu Ragam | Kan Simittum Neram | V. S. Narasimhan | K.J. Yesudas |
| Thaalaattu | Mamangam | M. Jayachandran | Bombay Jayashri |

The Hindi song 'Tumhen Dekhti Hoon To' from movie Tumhare Liye composed by Jaidev sung by Lata Mangeshkar was based on Ragam Karnaranjani too.
