= Bowli =

Janya raga of Carnatic music

- Arohanam: S R₁ G₃ P D₁ Ṡ
- Avarohanam: Ṡ N₃ D₁ P G₃ R₁ S

Bowli is a Carnatic raga (also spelled as Bauli or Bhauli). This raga is a janya of the 15th Melakarta raga Mayamalavagowla. This raga is known to be a morning raga.

== Structure and Lakshana ==
Ascending scale with C as Shadjam (tonic note)

Descending scale has one extra note N3

This ragam is an asymmetric scale and is classified as an audava-shadava ragam (five notes in the ascending scale and six notes in the descending scale).

- ārohaṇa: S R₁ G₃ P D₁ Ṡ (Note: Alternate notations: Hindustani: S Ṟ G P Ḏ Ṡ; Western: C D♭ E G A♭ C)
- avarohaṇa: Ṡ N₃ D₁ P G₃ R₁ S (Note: Alternate notations: Hindustani: Ṡ N Ḏ P G Ṟ S; Western: C B A♭ G E D♭ C)

The notes in this scale are shuddha rishabham, antara gandharam, panchamam and shuddha dhaivatam in arohana and additional kakali nishadham in avarohanam.
