= Nata (raga) =

Janya raga of Carnatic music

- Arohanam: S R₃ G₃ M₁ P D₃ N₃ Ṡ
- Avarohanam: Ṡ N₃ P M₁ R₃ S

Nata (nāṭa), also known as Nattai, is a rāgam in Carnatic music (musical scale of South Indian classical music). It is a janya rāgam (derived scale) from the 36th melakarta scale Chalanata. It is a janya scale, as it does not have all the seven swaras (musical notes) in the descending scale. It is an auspicious raga, which is mostly sung in the early part of the concert.

There is a raaga named Nata in Hindusthani music as well, and another raaga named Shuddha Nat. Raag Nat is the Hindustani equivalent of Nattai Raga.

== Structure of Lakshana ==
Ascending scale with shadjam at C, which is same as Chalanata scale

Descending scale with shadjam at C, which is same as Gambhiranata scale

Nata is an asymmetric rāgam that does not contain gandharam and dhaivatam in the descending scale. It is an sampurna-audava rāgam (or owdava rāgam, meaning pentatonic descending scale). Its ārohaṇa-avarohaṇa structure (ascending and descending scale) is as follows:

- ārohaṇa : S R₃ G₃ M₁ P D₃ N₃ Ṡ (Note: Alternate notations: Hindustani: S G̱ G M P Ṉ N Ṡ; Western: C D♯ E F G A♯ B C)
- avarohaṇa : Ṡ N₃ P M₁ R₃ S (Note: Alternate notations: Hindustani: Ṡ N P M G̱ S; Western: C B G F D♯ C)

It is a vivadi raga. The notes used in this scale are shadjam, shatsruthi rishabham, antara gandharam, shuddha madhyamam, panchamam, shatsruthi dhaivatam and kakali nishadham in ascending scale, with dhaivatam and gandharam skipped in descending scale. For the details of the notations and terms, see swaras in Carnatic music.

== Popular Compositions ==
There are many compositions set to Nata rāgam. Many compositions in praise of Lord Ganesha are set to this raga.
