= Tyagaraja =

Composer in Carnatic Classical Music (1767-1847)

Tyāgarāja
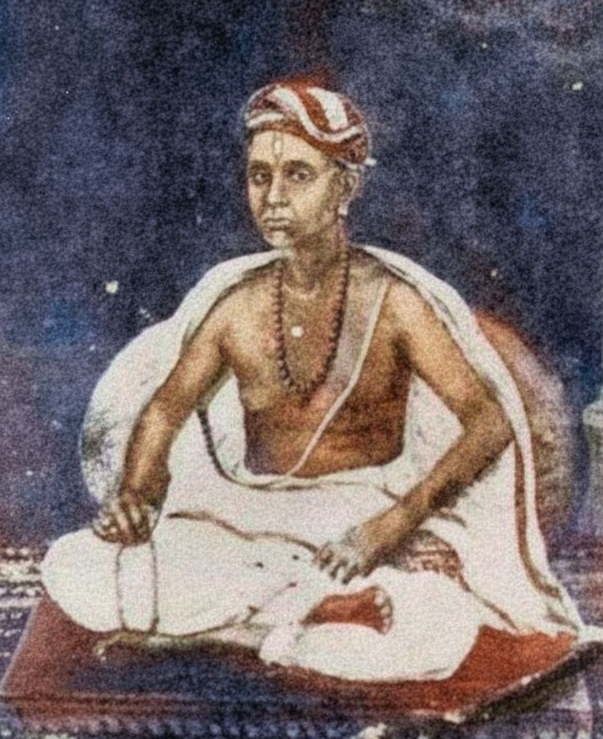
- A painting of Tyāgarāja from the Jaganmohan Palace in Mysore
- Born: Kākarla Tyāgabraḥmaṁ; 4 May 1767; Tiruvarur, Thanjavur, Maratha Kingdom
- Died: 6 January 1847 (aged 79); Thiruvaiyaru, Thanjavur Maratha kingdom
- Resting place: Thiruvaiyaru, Thanjavur District, Tamil Nadu, India
- Occupation: Carnatic composer
- Website: thiruvaiyaruthyagarajaaradhana.org

Sadguru Sri Tyāgarāja Swāmi (4 May 1767 – 6 January 1847), also known as Tyāgayya, and in full as Kākarla Tyāgabraḥmaṁ, was a composer of Carnatic Music, a form of Indian Classical Music. Tyāgarāja and his contemporaries, Śyāma Śāstri and Muthuswāmi Dikshitar, are regarded as the Trinity of Carnatic Music. Tyāgarāja composed hundreds of devotional kṛti (transl. compositions), mostly in Telugu and in praise of Rāma. Many of them remain popular to this day. Of special mention are five of his compositions called the Pañcaratna Kṛti (transl. five gems), which are often sung in programs held in his honor. Tyāgarāja composed many Utsava Sāmpradāya Kṛti (transl. festive ritual compositions), meant to be sung in temple rituals/festivities and Divya Nāma Saṅkīrtana (transl. divine compositions on the Lord's various names), sung as a part of concerts and daily life.

Tyāgarāja lived through the reigns of four kings of the Thanjavur Maratha rule – Thuljaji (1763–1787), Amarasimha (1787–1798), Serfoji II (1798–1832) and Shivaji II (1832–1855), although he served none of them.

== Biography ==
Tyāgarāja was born Kākarla Tyāgabraḥmaṁ in 1767 (Note: His birth date according to the Hindu lunar calendar Sarvajit 27th Soma, the Chaitra Śukla Saptami day (the seventh day of the bright half of the Hindu month of Chaitra), under the Puṣya star.) to a Telugu Vaidiki Mulakanādu Brahmin family in Thiruvarur, present-day Thiruvarur District of Tamil Nadu. There is a school of thought led by the musicologist B.M.Sundaram that contests this and proposes Thiruvaiyaru, in Thanjavur District of Tamil Nadu, as his birth place, though there is little evidence for this. His family name Kākarla indicates that his family had their roots in the village of the same name in Kambham, Mārkapuraṁ division of Prakasam district, Andhra Pradesh (called the Kurnool region of Prakasam district) and migrated to present-day Tamil Nadu after the fall of the Vijayanagara Empire. His family belonged to the Smārta tradition and Bharadwāja gotra. Tyāgarāja was the third son of his parents, Kākarla Rāmabraḥmaṁ and Sītamma.

Tyāgarāja's paternal grandfather was Kākarla Girirāja Braḥmaṁ/Girirāja Kavi (not the name-sake Giriraja Kavi). Girirāja Braḥmaṁ was a poet, scholar and a musician. He was born in Kākarla village, Kambham mandal, Mārkapuraṁ division of Prakasam District, in present-day Andhra Pradesh. Tyāgarāja's maternal grandfather was Kāḷahastayya, popularly addressed as Vīṇa Kāḷahastayya as he was a noted Vīṇa player. Tyāgarāja was said to have learnt to play the vīṇa in his childhood from Kāḷahastayya. After Kāḷahastayya's death, Tyāgarāja was said to have found Nāradīyam, a book on music.

Tyāgarāja was married to Parvati and after her death, he subsequently married her sister, Kamala.

Tyāgarāja spent most of his life in Thiruvaiyaru in the single room house (No. 31, Thirumanjana Veedhi) that was donated to his father Rāmabraḥmaṁ by Thuljaji, in whose court Rāmabraḥmaṁ worked. This house has since been renovated and opened to music lovers after years of neglect. There are records of his pilgrimage to Sri Raṅgaṁ, Tirumala and Kāñcipuraṁ. On his Kāñcipuraṁ pilgirmage, records mention him meeting the seer Upanishad Brahmayogin at the Braḥmendraḷ Maṭha

Tyāgarāja took siddhi (transl. attained liberation) on Puṣya Bahuḷa Pañcami - 6 January 1847, at the age of 79, a day after he took the vow of sanyāsa and was initiated into the order of Advāita Daśanāmi Saṁpradāya of sainthood. His last composition was Giripai Nelakonna (గిరిపై నెలకొన్న) in Rāga Sahānā, set to Ādi Tāḷa. He was interred on the banks of the river Kāveri river at Thiruvaiyaru the very next day.

== Musical career ==
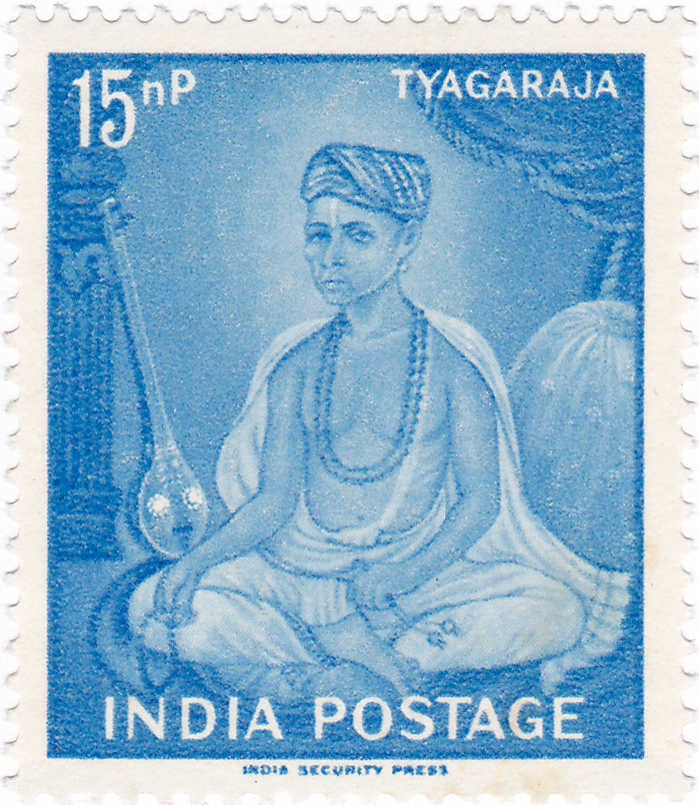
Tyagaraja on a 1961 Indian stamp

Tyagaraja began his musical training at an early age under Sonthi Venkata Ramanayya, the chief vidwan in the court of Thanjavur ruler Thuljaji, where Tyagaraja's father Ramabrahmam also worked. Tyagaraja hero-worshipped the celestial sage Narada; a reference to this is Tyagaraja's krithi Vara Nārada (rāga Vijayaśrī, Ādi tāḷam). Legend has it that a hermit taught him a mantra invoking Narada, and Tyagaraja, meditating on this mantra, received a vision of Narada and was blessed with the book Svarārnavam by the sage. Tyagaraja was said to have mastered the nuances of music from this book. Tyagaraja regarded music as a way to experience divinity. His compositions focused not only on the technicalities of classical music, but also on the expression (bhāva). He composed his first kriti, "Namo Namo Raghavaaya" in Sanskrit, in the Desika Todi raga and inscribed it on the walls of his house. His compositions are mainly of a devotional (bhakti) and philosophical nature. His songs feature himself usually either in an appeal to his deity of worship (primarily Rama), in musings, in narratives, giving a message to the public. He introduced the concept of saṇgati into the sāhityaṃ of a krithi, that was seen as a paradigm shift in Carnatic Classical Music. He is also known for composing kritis that depict ninda stuti (lovingly/flatteringly scolding the divine (also seen in compositions of Bhadrachala Ramadasu). He has also composed krithis in praise of Krishna, Shiva, Devi, Ganesha, Muruga, Saraswati, and Hanuman.

Tyagaraja's musical genius spread all across Thanjavur and its principalities (of which Thiruvarur and Thiruvaiyaru were also a part of) until it reached the king of Thanjavur, Serfoji II (also called Sarabhoji II). The king sent an invitation, along with many gifts, inviting Tyagaraja to attend the royal court. Tyagaraja, however, was not inclined towards a career at the court, as he felt it would chain his creativity and also his pursuit of the divine and rejected the invitation outright. He was said to have composed the krithi Nidhi Chala Sukhama (నిధి చాల సుఖమా) (transl. "Does wealth bring happiness?") on this occasion.

Tyagaraja was always immersed in his devotion to Rama and led a spartan way of life. Tyagaraja willingly taught music to anyone who approached him, thus earning him many disciples across various stages of his life. Prominent ones among them include Venkataramana Bhagavathar and Krishnaswamy Bhagavathar (the father-son duo of Walajapet), Thanjavur S Ramarao (who also happened to be his cousin; not to be confused with the namesake, T. Rama Rao (administrator)), Veena Kuppayyar, Manambuchavadi Venkatasubbayyar, Subbaraya Sastri (son of Shyama Sastri). Some of these disciples carefully codified his compositions on palm leaves and copper plates. Most of Tyagaraja's kritis are in vernacular language and thus gained immense popularity because of the ease with which they could be learnt and sung. Tyagaraja also composed many kritis in Sanskrit.

== Preservation of compositions ==
The codification, documentation and preservation of Tyagaraja's compositions by his disciples during his lifetime was not streamlined due to many reasons. The primary reason being, certain groups of Tyagaraja's disciples studied under him only during specific periods of his life, limiting their exposure to compositions created outside their own tutelage years. Consequently, the entirety of his compositions was not compiled into a unified corpus, and his compositions kept changing hands as the disciples/groups were scattered geographically. One of the earliest compilations of Tyagaraja's kritis was done by A. M. Chinnaswami Mudaliar, who, in 1893, published a volume titled, Oriental Music In European Notation. Mudaliar lavished rich praise on Tyagaraja's profound musical legacy in his work. It was only in the early 20th century that serious efforts were made to compile the compositions into a single collection. T. S. Parthasarathy, a leading scholar and critic on Carnatic Classical Music, published a text containing Tyagaraja's kritis and their meaning, after carefully reviewing the original manuscripts that were in possession of the families of Tyagaraja's disciples. These manuscripts are now preserved in the Saraswathi Mahal Library in Thanjavur. Also, musicologists like K. V. Srinivasa Iyengar and Rangaramanuja Iyengar made enormous efforts to compile Tyagaraja's compositions into volumes by contacting the families and descendents of Tyagaraja's disciples who possessed the palm leaves. K. V. Srinivasa Iyengar brought out Adi Sangita Ratnavali and Adi Tyagaraja Hridhayam in three volumes. Rangaramanuja Iyengar published Kriti Mani Malai in two volumes. Furthermore, Musiri Subramania Iyer, the doyen of Bhava Sangitam, had a vast collection of books in his library. T. K. Govinda Rao, his disciple, brought out a volume of Tyagaraja's compositions in English and Devanagari script. In Telugu, veena vidwan Manchala Jagannadha Rao compiled Tyagaraja's kritis in Telugu script and published it with the help of Tirumala Tirupati Devasthanams in seven volumes.

There are about 720 compositions available today, though there are claims that Tyagaraja composed 24,000 pieces. However, scholars are skeptical about these numbers, as there is no biographical evidence to support such claims. In addition to nearly 720 compositions (kritis), Tyagaraja composed two musical plays in Telugu, the Prahalada Bhakti Vijayam and the Nauka Charitam. Prahlada Bhakti Vijayam is in five acts with 45 kritis set in 28 ragas and 138 verses, in different metres in Telugu. Nauka Charitam is a shorter play in one act with 21 kritis set in 13 ragas and 43 verses. The latter is the most popular of Tyagaraja's operas, and is a creation of the composer's own imagination and has no basis in the Bhagavata Purana. Tyagaraja also composed a number of simple devotional pieces appropriate for choral singing.

The 20th-century Indian music critic K. V. Ramachandran wrote: "Tyagaraja is an indefatigable interpreter of the past... but if with one eye he looks backward, with the other he looks forward as well. Like Prajapati, he creates his own media and adores his Rama not alone with jewel-words newly fashioned, but also with jewel-[like]-music newly created. It is this facet of Tyagaraja that distinguishes him from his illustrious contemporaries." In other words, while Tyagaraja's contemporaries were primarily concerned with bringing to audiences the music of the past, Tyagaraja also pioneered new musical concepts at the same time.

== Remembrance ==
Tyagaraja Aradhana, the commemorative music festival, is held every year in Thiruvaiyaru, in Thanjavur district of Tamil Nadu, during the months of January to February in Tyagaraja's honor. This is a week-long music festival where various Carnatic musicians from all over the world converge at his resting place. On Pushya Bahula Panchami, (Note: Pushya Bahula Panchami – the fifth day of the dark half of the month of Pushya, in the Hindu calendar every year.) thousands of people and hundreds of Carnatic musicians sing the five Pancharatna Kritis in unison, accompanied by a large ensemble of performers on veenas, violins, flutes, nadasvarams, mridangams, and ghatams.

A sports complex in New Delhi, Thyagaraj Sports Complex, was named after him. An crater on the planet Mercury was named Tyagaraja in 1976.

== In popular culture ==
=== Films on Tyagaraja (biographical) ===
Apart from references to his works, using the kirtanas as songs, two films were made on his life. V. Nagayya made a biographical epic on Tyagaraja titled Tyagayya in 1946 which is still treated as a masterpiece of Telugu cinema. In 1981, Bapu–Ramana made Tyagayya with J. V. Somayajulu in the lead role. Another attempt is being made by Singeetam Srinivasa Rao to picturise Tyagaraja's life. Apart from these, Bombay Gnanam made a short film known as Endaro Mahanubavulu on Tyagaraja. The short film was released on 27 February 2021, on the 174th Tyagaraja Aradhana festival.

=== Raga on Tyagaraja (Musical scale) ===
Carnatic kriti 'Sri Ramachandram Bhajami' in Raga 'Sri Tyagaraja' created and composed by Mahesh Mahadev named after Saint Tyagaraja sung by Priyadarshini was released on 10 January 2023 at Sri Tyagaraja Samadhi during 176th Tyagaraja Aradhana festival

== Compositions ==
The name of Tyagaraja's compositions, the Pancharatnas, means "five gems" in Sanskrit. All of the Pancharatnas are set to the adi talam. A stable text has been handed down from the earlier musicians to the present day. All the compositions of Tyagaraja show the way for the systematic development of the respective ragas. In the Pancharatnas, Tyagaraja offers parameters as to how to systematically and scientifically develop a raga. The two fundamental conditions that must be satisfied for the systematic development of a raga are the arrangement of the svaras in the natural order of arohanam, and the avarohanam of the ragas so as to satisfy the sound principles of harmony and continuity. Pancharatnas satisfy these scientific principles. The Pancharatnas are composed in perfect sarvalaghu svaras.

- The first Pancharatna kriti is Jagadanandakaraka, sung in the raga Nata. It is composed in Sanskrit. It praises Rama as the source of all joy in the universe. Originally, there were only six charanams for this song. When the disciples examined the song, it contained ninety names of Rama in Sanskrit. The disciples requested Tyagaraja to slightly expand the song by adding two charanas containing eighteen more names of Rama. The saint acceded to the request of the disciples and that is the reason why the song Jagadanandakaraka contains three mudras containing the name of Tyagaraja while Endaro Mahanubhavulu contains two mudras containing the name Tyagaraja while the other three songs contain only one mudra each.
- The next is Duduku Gala in the raga Gowla set to Adi Talam. It is composed in Telugu. In this song, Tyagaraja takes the blame upon himself for all the misdeeds of men and ruminates on who would come and save him from this deplorable situation.
- The third is Saadhinchene in the raga Arabhi, set to Adi Talam. It is composed in Telugu. In this song, Tyagaraja lovingly criticizes Krishna for his cleverness in getting what he wants to be done.
- The fourth kriti, Kana Kana Ruchira is in the raga Varaali set to Adi Talam. It is composed in Telugu. In this song, Tyagaraja describes the infinite beauty of Rama.
- The fifth Pancharatna kriti, Endaro Mahanubhavulu, is in Sri Ragam. Contrary to popular beliefs that Tyagaraja instantaneously sang this krithi in a sabha conducted in the honour of his guru Sonthi Venkataramanayya in the presence of doyens of vidwans, Tyagaraja composed this krithi at the behest of Thanjavur S Ramarao. This definitive version is available in Tyagaraja's life history written by Venkataramana Bhagavathar.

== See also ==
- Kancherla Gopanna (Bhadrachala Ramadasu)
- Purandara Dasa
- Annamacharya
- Birmingham Thyagaraja Festival
- Cleveland Thyagaraja Festival
