= Gaula (raga) =

Janya raga of Carnatic music

- Arohanam: S R₁ M₁ P N₃ Ṡ
- Avarohanam: Ṡ N₃ P M₁ R₁ G₃ M₁ R₁ S

Gaula or Gowla (pronounced gauḷa) is a rāgam in Carnatic music (musical scale of South Indian classical music). It is a janya rāgam (derived scale) from the 15th melakarta scale Mayamalavagowla. It is a janya scale, as it does not have all the seven swaras (musical notes) in the ascending and descending scale.

Gaula is an ancient rāgam mentioned in Sangita Ratnakara, Sangita Makarandha and Sangita samayasara. It is an auspicious rāgam, which is mostly sung in the early part of the concert. It is a popular rāgam and also a ghana rāgam.

== Structure and Lakshana ==
Gaula is an asymmetric rāgam that does not contain dhaivatam in the scale and does not contain gandharam in the ascending scale. It is an audava-vakra-shadava rāgam (or owdava, meaning pentatonic ascending scale). Vakra-shadava means that the descending scale has 6 notes with inclusion of zig-zag movements (vakra). Its ārohaṇa-avarohaṇa structure (ascending and descending scale) is as follows:

- ārohaṇa : S R₁ M₁ P N₃ Ṡ (Note: Alternate notations: Hindustani: S Ṟ M P N Ṡ; Western: C D♭ F G B C)
- avarohaṇa : Ṡ N₃ P M₁ R₁ G₃ M₁ R₁ S (Note: Alternate notations: Hindustani: Ṡ N P M Ṟ G M Ṟ S; Western: C B G F D♭ E F D♭ C)

The notes used in this scale are shadjam, ekasruti rishabham (also known as Gaula rishabham), shuddha madhyamam, panchamam and kakali nishadham in ascending scale, with antara gandharam included in descending scale. For the details of the notations and terms, see swaras in Carnatic music.
