= Shree (Carnatic raga) =

Janya raga of Carnatic music

Shree ragam
- Arohanam: S R₂ M₁ P N₂ Ṡ
- Avarohanam: Ṡ N₂ P M₁ R₂ G₂ R₂ S

Shri ragam is an ancient ragam in the Carnatic tradition. It is also written as Sri or Sreeraga. This scale does not have all the seven swaras (musical notes) in the ascending scale. Shree is the asampurna melakartha equivalent of Kharaharapriya, the 22nd Melakarta rāgam. It is the last of the 5 Ghana rāgams of Carnatic music. It is a popular rāgam that is considered to be highly auspicious.

Notably, Carnatic Shree takes the lower madhyamam being the asampurna scale equivalent of Kharaharapriya. It is not related to the Hindustani raga, Shree.

== Structure and Lakshana ==
Ascending scale is same as Madhyamavati scale, shown here with shadjam at C

Notes in descending scale is that of Kharaharapriya scale, shown here with shadjam at C

Shree is an asymmetric rāgam that does not contain gāndhāram or dhaivatam in the ascending scale. It is a audava-vakra-sampurna rāgam (or owdava, meaning pentatonic in ascending scale), where vakra indicates the zig-zag nature of jumping notes in descending scale. Its ārohaṇa-avarohaṇa structure (ascending and descending scale) is as follows (see swaras in Carnatic music for details on below notation and terms):

- ārohaṇa: S R₂ M₁ P N₂ Ṡ (Note: Alternate notations: Hindustani: S R M P Ṉ Ṡ; Western: C D F G B♭ C)
- avarohaṇa: Ṡ N₂ P M₁ R₂ G₂ R₂ S (Note: Alternate notations: Hindustani: Ṡ Ṉ P M R G̱ R S; Western: C B♭ G F D E♭ D C) (or) Ṡ N₂ P D₂ N₂ P M₁ R₂ G₂ R₂ S (Note: Alternate notations: Hindustani: Ṡ Ṉ P D Ṉ P M R G̱ R S; Western: C B♭ G A B♭ G F D E♭ D C)

This scale uses the notes chatushruti rishabham, sadharana gandharam, shuddha madhyamam, panchamam, chatushruti dhaivatam and kaisiki nishadam.
