= Vedanayagam Sastriar =

Indian writer

The Venerable Vedanayagam Sastriar
- Native name: வேதநாயகம் சாஸ்திரியார்
- Church: Catholic Church (1774–85); Lutheranism (1785–1864)

Orders
- Rank: Catechist

Personal details
- Born: Vedapodagam; 7 September 1774 Tirunelveli, Carnatic Sultanate (now in Tamil Nadu, India)
- Died: 24 January 1864 (aged 89) Tanjore, Madras Presidency, British India (now Thanjavur, Tamil Nadu, India)
- Buried: CSI St. Peter's Church, Thanjavur
- Parents: Gnanapoo (mother); Devesagayam (father)
- Spouse: Vyagammal (m. 1795; death 1796); Muthamma (m. 1801; death 1829); Varodayammal (m. 1829)
- Children: Gnanadeepam (adopted daughter); Gnanasigamani (son); Noah Gnanadickam (son); Elia Devasigamani (son); Manonmani (daughter)
- Occupation: Tamil poet, dramatist, scholar, theologian, hymnwriter
- Education: Tranquebar Mission

Vedanayagam Sastriar (7 September 1774 – 24 January 1864) was a Tamil poet, dramatist, scholar, theologian and hymnwriter from the Lutheran tradition. He composed a total of 133 books, including plays such as Bethlehem Kuravanji (1800) and theological texts such as Aranathintham (1837). He also composed more than 400 hymns, may of which are still used in Tamil Christian keerthanai tradition.

Vedanayagam preached Christianity at many places including Madras and Jaffna. He had knowledge in various fields like theology, astronomy, mathematics, physiology and sociology. He was conferred with several titles including Gnanadeepa Kavirayar (king among poets of the Divine Light). During 1829-32, he served as court poet of Serfoji II, the penultimate Maratha King of Thanjavur.

His descendants continue to carry his theological legacy.

== Biography ==
=== Early life ===
Vedanayagam was born on 7 September 1774 into a Vellalar family in Tirunelveli, then under the Carnatic Sultanate. He was the second child and only son of Gnanapoo and Devesagayam (born Arunachalam), a Catholic Catechist. Vedanayagam was initially named Vedapodagam. His elder sister was named Soosaiyammal and his younger sister was christened Bakkiammal. Starting from his fifth year, Vedanayagam studied grammar. His mother died when he was seven. In 1783, his father arranged for Vedanayagam to learn literature and mathematics under a private tutor.

=== Education under Schwarz ===
Due to trouble with his church, Devasagayam moved to Thanjavur with his children in 1785. There, all four embraced Protestantism under the influence of the German Lutheran preacher Christian Friedrich Schwarz. After four months in Thanjavur, they returned to Tirunelveli. In 1786, Schwarz came to Tirunelveli and obtained Devasagayam's consent for educating Vedanayagam at Thanjavur. Among Schwarz's other students was Prince Serfoji (later King Serfoji II), son of Thuljaji, the then Maratha King of Thanjavur. Serfoji developed a lifelong friendship with Vedanayagam.

=== Teaching career ===
During 1789-91, Vedanayagam studied at the Lutheran Theological Seminary in Tranquebar (now Tharangambadi) under the Professors Dr. John, Dr. Kammerer, and Rev. Johan Peter Rottler. He also acquired some proficiency in German and English. After completing his education, he returned to Thanjavur, and in his 19th year, he worked as a gospel school teacher in the towns around Thanjavur, teaching literature, mathematics and ethics. Later he became the Principal Thanjavur Bible College. During this period, composed texts like Parabaran Malai (Garland of praises to the Lord), Gnana Eththappattu (Songs of Wisdom), Gnana Vazhi (Divine Way), Adi Anandam and Parama Needhi Puranam (The story of Divine Justice). There were written in colloquial Tamil and were therefore easy for students to comprehend.

In 1795, Vedanayagam married his cousin Vyagammal as per the wishes of his father and Schwarz. But after one year, Vyagammal died during childbirth. Schwarz died on 13 February 1798. The next year, Devasagayam fell ill and died while catechising in Jaffna, British Ceylon (now Sri Lanka). The songs composed by Vedanayagam mourning these deaths are found in Parabaran Malai, Jebamalai etc.

=== In Serfoji-II 's court ===
Serfoji II, who was crowned King of Thanjavur in 1798, treated Vedanayagam as his elder brother. Despite the attitude of some courtiers opposed to Christianity, Vedanayagam freely expressed his faith. During this period he also acquired knowledge in Telugu, Sanskrit and Latin.

During this period, Vedanayagam converted the librarian of Tanjore Saraswathi Mahal Library to Christianity after many rounds of argument. N. Samuel of Tranquebar, the son of that librarian, later became a noted theologian and poet. Vedanayagam, Henry Alfred Krishnapillai of Palyamkottai, and N. Samuel are known as the triumvirate of Tamil Christian poets.

=== Missionary life ===
In his 27th year, Vedanayagam married Muthamma (another of his relatives), in the presence of Rev. John Caspar Kohlhoff. In 1811 the couple adopted Gnanadeepam, the daughter of Vedanayagam's sister. Vedanayagam employed his family and a choir (in kalakshepam style) to preach the gospel to distant towns and villages.

In 1808, the Thanjavur congregation awarded him the title of Veda Siromany (Gem among Evangelical Poets). In the same year, the Tranquebar congregation asked them to stage the Gnana Nondi Nadagam in their town. After that, they honoured him with the title of Suvisesha Kavirayar (King among Evangelical Poets) and a palanquin.

In 1809, the Christians of Vepery area of Madras (now Chennai) invited Vedanayagam to stage his play Bethlehem Kuravanji (1800). Later, they honored him with the title of Gnanadeepa Kavirayar (king among poets of the Divine Light) and a palanquin.

From 1810 to 1855, he composed and enhanced his Jebamalai. This work was influenced by eminent Tamil poets. Reginald Heber, the then Bishop of Calcutta, who came to Thanjavur in 1826, bought a copy of Jebamalai and another collection of Vedanayagam's hymns and sent them to the British Museum, London.

Vedanayagam revisited Jaffna with his family in 1811 and stayed there for a while under the patronage of Rev. Christian David to preach in the surrounding towns and villages. Later, he was called and felicitated by the royals of Travancore and Mysore.

In 1815, the Christians of Tiruchirappalli, in unison with the Europeans, requested Vedanayagam to stage the drama Perinbakkadhal for 45 days. On June 18 of that year, under the leadership of Pohle, they conferred the title of Veda Sastriar, equivalent to the Doctor of Divinity. It was only after this event that he was called Vedanayagam Sastriar, a title that still continues in his lineage.

=== Later years ===
Colin Mackenzie, who served as the first Surveyor General of India (1815–21), assigned Vedanayagam the task of collecting historical data on the Thanjavur region.

In 1827, Rev. L.P. Haubroe took charge of the Thanjavur SPG Mission. Haubroe and Vedanayagam had a difference of opinion on resolving caste conflicts in the congregation. As a result, Haubroe excommunicated Vedanayagam and some members of his community from the congregation. As a result, Vedanayagam suffered financially but was helped by Serfoji II.

When Vedanayagam was 55, Muthamma died. He then married Varodayammal, daughter of Santhappa Pillai of Thanjavur. Rev. Brotherto solemnized the marriage.

Vedanayagam taught Tamil to Christian workers including George Spergneider, and hence was given the title Munshi. In 1829 he was appointed court poet of Serfoji II. The next year, he left the school where he worked since Schwarz's time.

In 1832, Serfoji II died. As per his wish, his body was transported only after Vedanayagam had composed and sung a hymn by his bier. Serfoji's son and successor, Shivaji of Thanjavur did not emulate his father in supporting Vedanayagam. Hence, Vedanayagam's disciples dispersed and continued the ministry on their own. Vedanayagam was suffering from a lack of money. However, nobles and wealthy people who appreciated his songs sent him gifts. Some Germans under the British officer David Ochterlony also gave him cash gifts.

In 1841 Bishop George Spencer and Rev. Robert Caldwell met Vedanayagam in Thanjavur and conversed with him.

In January 1845, the Thanjavur congregation entered into an agreement with Vedanayagam, according to which they promised to send a contribution every month, and announced that this arrangement would continue in the future. Even in present times, the Christians of Thanjavur extend the same respect and support to the descendants of Vedanayagam.

Vedanayagam earned a certain amount of income through the publication of his books by the Society for the Promotion of Christian Knowledge (SPCK). During Lent and Christmas he held special services called Sadhur at which he expounded the Bible, especially the passion of Christ.

In 1850, when Vedanayagam was 75, Rev. Guest and Rev. Henry Bower commissioned an artist to paint his portrait.

From 1850 to 1858 there was a period of struggle between Vedanayagam and the church leaders. G. U. Pope, after taking over as head of the congregation, imposed certain restrictions on Vedanayagam and his three children. However, they reconciled later. In 1856, Vedanayagam participated in the jubilee of the Tranquebar congregation.

=== Death ===
After completing the daily prayers with his family on 24 January 1864, Vedanayagam died at the age of 89 in Thanjavur, around 4 pm. After that, the bells tolled in the local churches, and the streets of Thanjavur were illuminated with candles. A whole night of biblical readings and speeches were performed near the bier where his body was laid. Three of the lyrics he composed were written on a sheet of paper and placed in his hand.

After that, his body was taken in a procession with solemn music. People had set up arches in the path and strewn flowers all along. Rev. Naylor and Rev. Albert conducted the funeral service. The body was laid to rest in the cemetery of present-day CSI St. Peter's Church, Thanjavur with full honours.

== Partial bibliography ==
Year	Title		Type
Year	Tamil original	Transliteration	Type
1800	பெத்தலகேம் குறவஞ்சி	Bethlehem Kuravanji	Play
1800	ஞான நொண்டி நாடகம்	Gnana Nondi Nadagam	Play
1809	சென்னப் பட்டணப் பிரவேசம்	Chenna Pattana Pravesam	Play
1813-34	பேரின்பக் காதல்	Perinbakkadhal	Theological treatise
1821	தியானப் புலம்பல்	Dhyana Pulambal	Theological treatise
1830	ஞானத்தச்ச நாடகம்	Gnanathacha Nadagam	Play
1837; Pub.1885	ஆரணாதிந்தம்	Aranathintham	Theological treatise
	அறிவானந்தம்	Arivanandham	Theological treatise
	ஆதியானந்தம்	Adi Anandam	Theological treatise
	ஞான அந்தாதி	Gnana Andhadhi	Theological treatise
	ஞான ஏற்றப்பாட்டு	Gnana Eththappattu	Theological treatise
	ஞானக் கும்மி	Gnana Kummi	Theological treatise
	ஞான வழி	Gnana Vazhi	Theological treatise
	ஞானவுலா	Gnana Ula	Theological treatise
	செபமாலை	Jebamalai	Theological treatise
	பராபரன் மாலை	Parabaran Malai	Theological treatise
	பரம நீதி புராணம்	Parama Needhi Puranam	Theological treatise
	வண்ண சமுத்திரம்	Vanna Samudram	Theological treatise

== Titles ==
Year	Title	Conferred by	Note
1808	Veda Siromany	Thanjavur congregation	
1808	Suvisesha Kavirayar	Tranquebar congregation	For Gnana Nondi Nadagam
1809	Gnanadeepa Kavirayar	Vepery congregation	For Bethlehem Kuravanji
1815	Veda Sastriar	Tiruchirappalli congregation	For Perinbakkadhal
	Vithaga Kavignar		
	Viviliya Arignar		
	Gnana Kavichakravarthi		

== Descendants ==
=== Gnanadeepam family ===
Gnanadeepam (1811–1870), the adopted daughter of Vedanayagam and Muthamma, was literate in English. She supported Vedanayagam in his works, such as translating one of his works into English. At the age of 32, she married her cousin Daniel Mangalam Pillai (an overseer in the Public Works Department) and gave birth to a daughter named Gnanagaram.

=== Gnanasigamani family ===
Gnanasigamani (1813–1877), the son of Vedanayagam through Muthamma, taught Tamil to European priests at a theological seminary. He authored the works Messiah Magathuvam (The Glory of the Messiah) and A Dialogue between two Religions. He traveled widely and held kalakshepams. With his wife Sadhanandi Ammal, he had nine children: Vedasiromani, Thabomani (1844–1909), Dayamani, Jebamani (1849–1924), Subamani (1852-?), Navamani, Jeyamani, Vedamani (1864–1915), and Jeevamani.

==== Vedasiromani ====
He excelled in three languages and took up a government job. However, he died young.

==== Thabomani family ====
Thabomani married Gnanagaram, the daughter of his paternal aunt Gnanadeepam.

==== Jeyamani family ====
She had a son J. Savarirayan Vedanayagam in about 1892. He worked as a ranger in the Forest Department. After retirement, he was living in Salem as of 1975.

==== Dayamani family ====
She married Michel.

==== Navamani family ====
She gave birth to M. Bagavathar Vedanayaga Sastriar (1885–27 October 1938).

==== Vedamani family ====
He fathered Gnanagaram, who later married Bagavathar Vedanayaga Sastriar. This couple had a son - Jeyaseelan Vedanayaga Sastriar (1914–1968).

===== Jeyaseelan family =====
Jeyaseelan married Sundari "Esther" Ammal and fathered Durairaj on 12 October 1936.

====== Durairaj family ======
Durairaj was educated at St. Paul's School in Chennai before going to Madras Christian College. Due to ill health, he discontinued his studies. After a short stint in the Military Engineer Services, he began assisting his father Jeyaseelan in ministry, debuting with a kalakshepam in 1956 at St. Thomas Church, Kolar Gold Fields. In 1961, he married Susila, daughter of Pastor Manuel Pillai of the India Evangelical Lutheran Church (IELC). His ministry soon expanded to Sri Lanka, Malaysia, Singapore, Brunei, Gulf countries, Europe, USA, Canada, and England. He earned titles including a Doctor of Divinity (2005). He has four children:

- Esther Georgina
- Jeyaseelan Jebaraj
- Sarah Angelina (16 August 1968 - ) was named after Sarah Navaroji. She received an M.A. English degree from the University of Madras before marrying Martin Deva Prasath (a chemistry lecturer) on 20 January 1992. The couple are known for their singing and preaching.
- Clement Immanuel (22 August 1970 - ) studied at Madras Christian College and National Institute of Information Technology (NIIT), Nungambakkam, Chennai. He used to play violin in his father’s ministerial tours, and also compile music for his father’s song albums. His first assignment was "East West Christian Melodies". In this album, he composed music for both Western and Tamil classical songs. In 1996, he married Elizabeth Monica, a Sunday school teacher and chorister. The couple has two children: Sudharsan Isaac and Kharisma Abigail.

==== Jebamani family ====
Jebamani married Arputham Ammal (one of the sisters of Rev. Arulappan Devadasan of Palyamkottai). The couple had a son named J. G. Vedanayagam (1885–1960) and daughter named Gnanadeepam Sadanandammal.

===== Sadanandammal family =====
Sadanandammal married an Imperial Forestry Service officer named Samuel Muthusamy Srinivasan. This couple had five children. One of them died in infancy. Of the remaining,

- Dayamani was the eldest daughter
- Thambidurai briefly learnt Carnatic music from M. S. Subbulakshmi's mother Madurai Shanmukhavadivu before joining the army. His daughter Kanchana is a doctor based in Germany.
- Akilamani (4 May 1927 – 5 May 1979) was a renowned Bharatanatyam dancer of her time, often performing to the works of Vedanayagam. She married George David Sigamani in 1945. The couple had their first daughter Kalpana in 1946. Another daughter, Gitamani, is a doctor based in England. She has a daughter.

=== Noah Gnaanaadikkam family ===
Noah Gnaanaadikkam (1830–1902; Vedanayagam's first son through Varodayammal), married Arulammal of Peermade and gave birth to seven daughters (Pamani, Arulmani, Rahel, Sigamani, Gnanasasthiram, Manonmani and Ammani) and a son named Vedaanandam (1870–1930).

Vedaanandam fathered Shem Vedanayagam (1902–8 June 1998), who fathered Simon Deivasigaamani (1941–1991), who married Jemima Vimala Leelavathy. The couple had two sons - Samson and Noah Augustine Immanuel(born 27 August 1978). Noah studied Tamil literature at Bishop Heber College and Thanjai Tamilvel Umamaheswaran Karanthai Arts College (2001–03). As of 2016, he was engaged in a doctoral of the literary works of the first Vedanayagam.

=== Eliah Deivasigaamani family ===
Eliah Deivasigaamani (1834–1908; The first Vedanayagam's second son through Varodayammal) helped in his father's kalakshepams by composing songs and delivering religious sermons. He married Adhibagyathammal (daughter of Mayavaram Savarimuthu Pillai) and fathered ten children: Vedamaniammal, Vedanayagam, Thayammal, Varodhayam Esther, Vedapodhagam, Devadas, Gnanendram, Manonmani, Gnanamani and Nagomi Gnanadeepam.

=== Manonmani family ===
Manonmani (The first Vedanayagam's daughter through Varodayammal) used to sing songs and read the Bible during her father's lectures. At the age of 24, she married Masilamani. She died in 1861 while teaching Tamil and English in Nagapattinam. The couple's daughter Vedasastram married Samuel Pillai.

The descendants of Vedanayagam continue his works even today as the seventh generation.
