= N. Samuel of Tranquebar =

Indian theologian

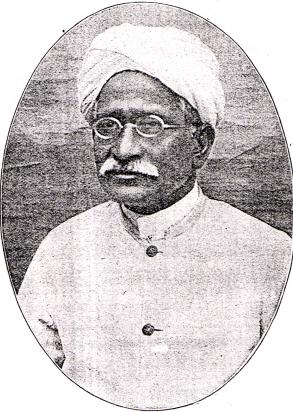
Portrait of Rev. N. Samuel

Rev. N. Samuel of Tranquebar (Tamil: ஞா.சாமுவேல்; 18 September 1850 – 20 May 1927) was a professor in divinity, pastor in the Tamil Evangelical Lutheran Church (T.E.L.C.), and a hymnodist. He was a famous poet and author of many books. He was also the first member of the Leipzig Evangelical Lutheran Mission (L.E.L.M.) Council.

== Timeline ==
- Born at Kumbakonam on 18 September 1850
- Trained by R. Handmann, Tranquebar Seminary 1877–1880 & 1892–1901
- Ordained on 31 October 1878 at Tranquebar, by senior J. M. N. Schwartz
- Pastor at Tranquebar 1880–1891 & 1897–1919
- Pastor at Karaikal 1897–1919
- Pastor at Manikramam 1919
- Pastor at Porayar 1917–1919
- Pastor at Bangalore 1921
- With Missouri Mission 1921–1927
- Returned to T.E.L.C. Early 1927
- Died in Madras on 20 May 1927

== Professor ==
He was the first Indian professor in the Theological Colleges in Tranquebar, Porayar, and Bangalore (United Theological College). He was slated to teach some classes in the Gurukul Lutheran Theological College in Chennai, when he died.

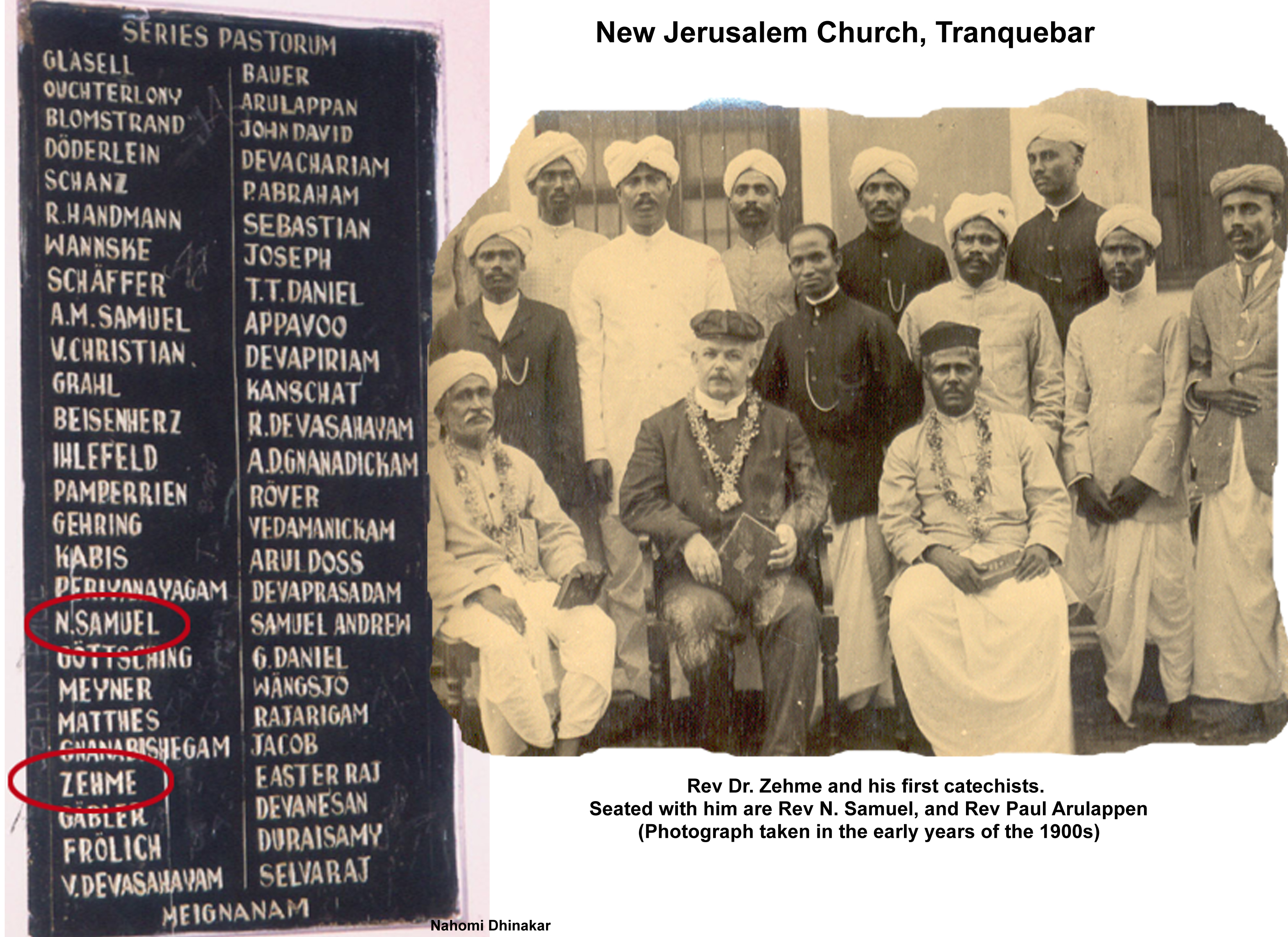
Series Pastorum in New Jerusalem Church in Tranquebar

== Poet ==
Best known among his lyrics are "En Meetpar Uyirodirukayilay" (என் மீட்பர் உயிரோடிருக்கயிலே), "Senaigalin Kartharey" (சேனைகளின் கர்த்தரே), "Seerthiri Yegavasthey" (சீர்திரி ஏகவஸ்தே நமோ நமோ), and "Gunapadu Paavi" (குணப்படு பாவி). He composed the college song "Arulaar Putkarathil Thangi" and designed the monogram, for the Gurukul Lutheran Theological College.

Vedanayagam Sastriar of Tanjore, Krishnapillai of Palyamkottai, and N. Samuel of Tranquebar were known as the triumvirate of Tamil Christian poets.

One of his earliest compositions was about a journey to Tanjore called "Thanjai Payan Padham". Another was "Kallu Kummi" (The Toddy Kummi), where the strong drink talks about her glories, which made the drunkard blush in shame. His book Gospel Lyrics contains 200 songs composed over a period of 60 years.

He is remembered as a translator who put German hymns into Tamil meter, including the following:

- Gott sei Dank in aller Welt, "Kartharukku Sthothiram" (கர்த்தருக்கு ஸ்தோத்திரம்)
- O Haupt voll Blut und Wunden, "Erathangaayam Kuth-thum" (இரத்தம் காயம் குத்தும்)
- Nun freut euch, Gottes Kinder all, "Magizh Karthaavin Manthayae" (மகிழ் கர்த்தாவின் மந்தையே)
- Herr Jesu Christ, dich zu uns wend, "Aa Yesuvae, Neer Yengalai" (ஆ ஏசுவே, நீர் எங்களை)
- Wer weiß, wie nahe mir mein Ende, "Naal Pome, Yen Saavu Velai" (எந்த நாள் போம், ஏன் சாவு வேளை)
- Laudamus te, "Ummai Thuthikirome" (உம்மை துதிக்கிறோமே)
- Du, o schönes Weltgebäude, "Veghuperuku-inbamaana" (வெகுபேருக்கு இன்பமான)

== Author ==
Rev. N. Samuel wrote several books on Lutheran history, theology, and practical Christian living. He also wrote for children. He wrote in both Tamil and German, and also translated several books from German to Tamil.

Among the books authored by him are:

- Thoopa Kalasam, Censer of Incense
- Thiru tiru virunthadi, Pocket Communion Book
- Ullathu Narpathu
- Pushpa Kodai
- Companion to the Village Preacher
- Life of Ziegenbalg
- Tranquebar Mission History
- Village Sermons Vol I Suvisesha Vaakiya Prasanga Puthagam, sermonic works on the Gospels
- Village Sermons Vol II Niruba Vaakiya Prasanga Puthagam, sermonic works on the Epistles
- Plain Talk of a Plain Christian
- The Pocket Prayer Book
- Martin Luther Sasthriyaar Viviya Sarithira Surukkam
- Yerusalem Nagar Alivu
- Yezhu Siru Vaarthaigal
- Christian Proverbs and Maxims--Naru Malarkothu
- Tharangai Mission Sarithiram (Styled after Fenger's History of the Tranquebar Mission)
- Orusandhinaal Dhyaanam, meditations for Lent with 40 meditations
- Ullathu Solvane

For theological students, he wrote:

- Samayosidha Vedha Vaakiya Kuripu, concordance
- Sathiya Vedhabayiram, an introduction to the Bible
- Thiruchabai Varusha Vivaram, Outlines of Church History

For children, he wrote:

- Children's storybook, Paalar Poocharam
- Moral tales, Kadhaa Malar Koodai, Basket of Flowers
- Children's prayer book

For parents, he wrote:

- Petror Ozhukkam

His translations:

- Mey Manasthaabam kanneer, translation of Heinrich Muller's Tears of Repentance, a booklet that is a good preparation for partaking in the Holy Communion.

He was one of those responsible for the translation of a revised version of the New Testament.

== Pastor ==
Most of his life was spent in Tranquebar, the little port town that welcomed missionaries Bartholomaeus Ziegenbalg (and Heinrich Plütschau), sent by King Frederick IV of Denmark in 1706, and Christian Friedrich Schwarz, sponsored at the time by the Danish Missionary Society in Copenhagen.

He was ordained on 31 October 1878 at Tranquebar, by senior J. M. N. Schwartz. From that moment on, he served as pastor in the Lutheran Mission (later known as T.E.L.C.) until his death on 20 May 1927, except for a brief stint with the Missouri Mission, towards the end of his life from 1921 to 1927. The towns and cities where he served are: Tranquebar (1880–1891 and 1897–1919), Karaikal (1897–1919), Manikramam (1919), Porayar (1917–1919), Bangalore (1921), and Madras.

He preached his last sermon on 1 May 1927, in the Lutheran Adaikalanathar Church, Purasawakam, Madras, on John 10:11–16.

== Theologian ==
His theology was rooted in Lutheran Pietism, a renewed form of the post-reformation Lutheranism that was held by theologians in Halle in the 16th century, such as August Hermann Francke (1663–1727) and Philipp Jakob Spener (1635–1705). He was well versed in the life, works, and teachings of Martin Luther.

He was a great lover of Spurgeon's works, and possessed many of his books in his library. After reading John Ploughman's Talk and John Ploughman's Pictures, he wrote Ullathu Solvayne. Samuel was known as Tamil Spurgeon, although it is not clear if he was known for his strictness in doctrinal matters or for his homiletic gifts. He was also familiar with Waltharian views of Lutheranism. His allegiance was to God first and only then to his church. When it was time for the German missionaries to leave India, leaving the leadership on Indian shoulders, it was decided that the church would follow an Episcopal form of church government. Rev. N. Samuel felt that this and other innovations that were introduced were not according to the Biblical model and protested. When he realised that change was inevitable, in the middle of 1921, he left the T.E.L.C that he had served all his life, and joined the Missouri Mission. He returned to the T.E.L.C. in 1927 shortly before his death.
