= Manikarnikeswarar Temple =

Manikarnikeswarar Temple is a Hindu temple located in the town of Thanjavur, India. The temple was constructed by Serfoji II in 1827. The principal deity is Manikarnikeswarar and the goddess, Mangala Nayaki Amman.
