= Shastri (degree) =

Sanskrit degree

A Shastri (Hindi: शास्त्री) degree is awarded to a student after a course in the old education system of India in Sanskrit and other subjects focussing on the text of the Sanskrit texts (or shastras). Ex pg-geologists is known as Bhu gharva sastri भू -गर्भ शास्त्री.In some other term degree is awarded to pupils after years of higher education in the Sanskrit language (at institutions such as Sampurnanand Sanskrit University or Rashtriya Sanskrit Sansthan in India).The length of training required for a Shastri degree is usually seven years following the completion of secondary school, although students may continue training for an additional two years to obtain an Acharya degree. At the completion of their training, while recipients retain their surname for their descendants, they are given the option to change their current surname to reflect attainment of the degree. This degree also enables pupils to become accredited Hindu Priests and Religious Teachers.

But Astrology is still under consideration as a subject in various universities as per the UGC guidelines. So many Colleges and Institutes are following these guidelines. But the approval of astrology courses is still pending. Still the issue of a certificate as an Acharya or Shastri degree in Astrology is not valid. So many Astrologers claim they are Acharya, But only few of them have an Acharya or Shastri Degree in a subject other than Astrology.

== Inherited surname ==
Shastri also exists as a surname through patriarchal inheritance, and so people with the name may not necessarily have undergone its associated training. Examples are the descendants of the Tamil Lutheran poet Vedanayagam Sastriar (1774-1864).

== See also ==
- Acharya (Master's degree)
- Shastra
