= Siege of Tanjore =

The siege of Tanjore was a series of battles fought between forces of the British East India Company, the Arcot State and the Rajah of Tanjore. The sieges took place after Thuljaji, the Rajah of Tanjore, provided fewer levies and money than the British had required him to and invaded lands claimed by the Arcot State.

== History ==
From 1766 to 1769, the British East India Company, the Maratha Confederacy, and the Arcot State (also known as the Carnatics) waged a war against the Kingdom of Mysore, a nation led by Hyder Ali. To fight Hyder's armies, the Anglo-Maratha-Carnatic alliance employed a large number of levied soldiers and mercenaries from various vassal and allied states. These states were also expected to provide financial aid to their allies. However, one of these states, the Rajdom of Tanjore, was noted as having provided a smaller contingent of forces during the Mysore War than other states had. It was also revealed that Thuljajil the Rajah of Tanjore, had been in communication with Hyder Ali; these actions earned the Raj the enmity of the British and the Arcots.

In 1769, forces of the Rajdom of Tanjore invaded the tribal lands of the Marawars, which the Arcot State claimed were its subjects. The Nabob of the Arcot State, Muhammad Ali Khan Wallajah, demanded that the Tanjors withdraw, but this request was rebuked. In response to this rejection, Wallajah contacted the British, who agreed to gather an army at Trichinopoly to drive out the Tanjore forces. The British forces were led by General Joseph Smith, while the Carnatic forces were led by Wallajah's son.

The allied army advanced on the city of Tanjore, and laid siege to the city on 22 September 1769. The besieging army succeeded in breaching the city's wall on 22 October, and plans were made to storm the city. However, the commander of the Carnatic army instead chose to negotiate with Thuljaji. On the evening before the assault was to take place, the Carantic commander informed Smith that the Rajah of Tanjore had surrendered. The British were insulted by the separate peace, but were able to remain in control of a border town that had captured during the conflict. One source records that 158 "europeans" and 281 "natives" were killed during the siege.

Following the victory at Tanjore, the British army helped the Carnatics officially conquer the Marawar chiefs in 1772, whom the allies had recently liberated. In 1773, the Carnatics claimed that the Rajah of Tanjore had violated their treaty, and so the British and Carnatic forces returned to Tanjore and laid siege to the city a second time. The city walls were breached and stormed, resulting in the second fall of the city. Both the British and Carnatics won new concessions from the Rajah of Tanjore, who was later restored to his throne at the insistence of the East India Company.
