= Amar Singh of Thanjavur =

Raja of Thanjavur Maratha kingdom from 1793 to 1798

Amar Singh
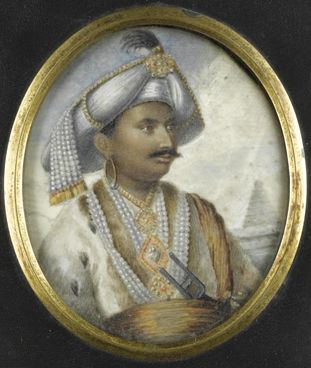
- Amar Singh

Raja of Thanjavur
- Reign: 1793 - 1798
- Coronation: 1793, Durbar Hall, Tanjore Fort
- Predecessor: Serfoji II
- Successor: Serfoji II
- Born: after 1738
- Died: 19 April 1802; Madhearjune
- House: House of Bhonsle
- Father: Pratap Singh
- Religion: Hinduism

Amar Singh or Ramaswami Amarasimha Bhonsle (Marathi: रामस्वामी अमरसिंह भोसले) was the younger son of the Maratha Raja of Thanjavur Pratap Singh and served as the regent soon after the death of his brother Thuljaji II and ruled Thanjavur Maratha Kingdom in the name of Thulaja's minor son Serfoji II from 1787 to 1793.

Raja Thulaja of Thanjavur died in 1786 and his adopted son Serfoji was young. So, his other son Amar Singh, whom Raja Tulaja had through his concubine, was appointed Raja.

== Reign ==
In 1793, he usurped the throne after deposing the boy-King Serfoji and ruled as the absolute ruler of Thanjavur from 1793 to 1798. Later, British gained power and placed Serfoji on throne.

He is said to have been very generous and to have given vast amounts of land to learned men. He resisted attempts by the British to seize the kingdom right until the time of his deposition in favour of his adoptive nephew, 29 June 1798.

He showed interest in Telugu and Sanskrit dramas. Mathru Boothana was a famous poet in his court and he composed Parijatapaharanam, which bears similarity to Kuchipudi dance.

== See also ==
- Thanjavur Maratha kingdom

Preceded by Serfoji II	Maratha Raja of Thanjavur has been deleted.)); 1793–1798	Succeeded by Serfoji II
