= Manora Fort, Thanjavur =

Manora Fort
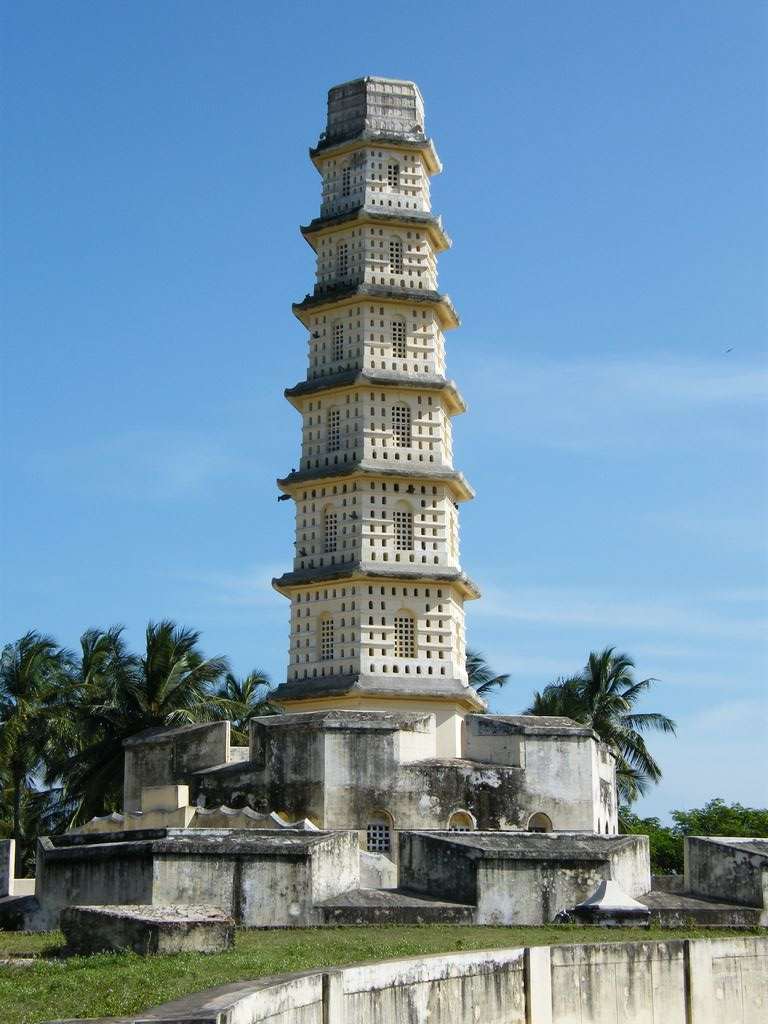

- Location in Tamil Nadu, India
- 10.268°N 79.304°E
- Location: Peravurani, Thanjavur, India

History
- Built: Serfoji II

Site notes
- Architectural style: Maratha Architecture

The Manora Fort is situated 20 km (12 mi) away from Pattukkottai, Tamil Nadu, India and 60 km (37 mi) away from Thanjavur. The fort was built by Maratha ruler Serfoji II in 1814–1815 to commemorate the successful advance of the British over Napoléon Bonaparte. It is an eight-storeyed, hexagonal tower, which is 23 m high overlooking the Bay of Bengal. The fort derives its name Manora, from the word Minaret.

In December 2004, five monuments including the fort were damaged in the Indian Ocean tsunami. It was planned in 2007 by the State Tourism Department to renovate the structure and improve its infrastructure by building several additional facilities including upgrading the children's park and building a tourist's shed.

== History ==
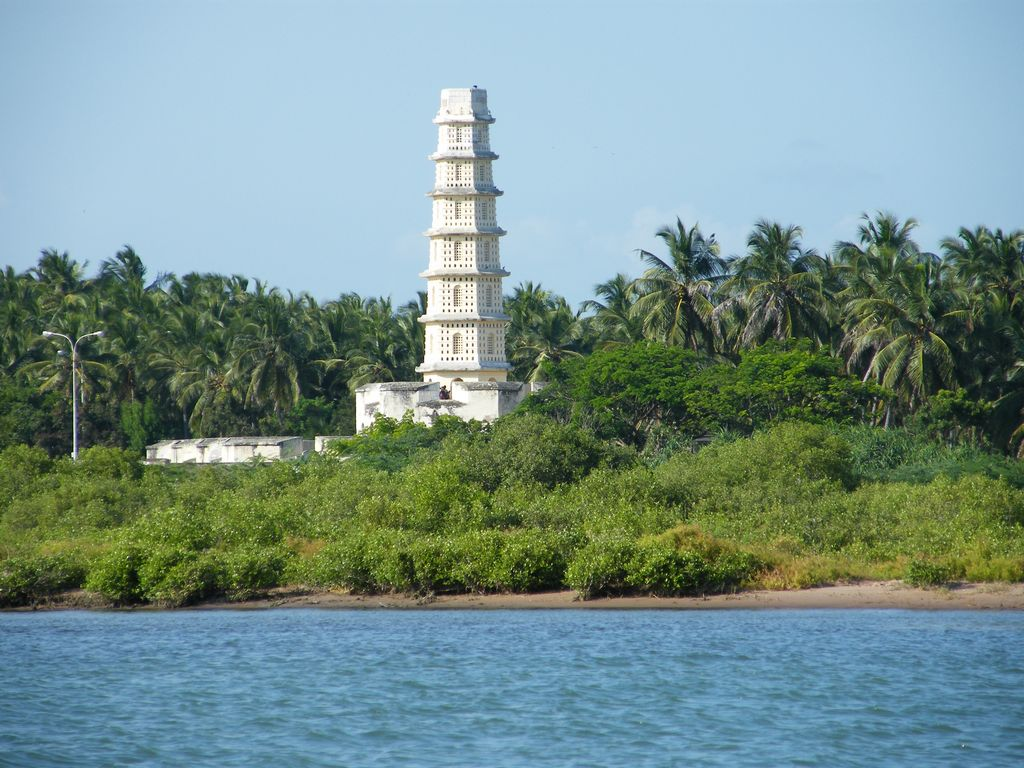
Manora, The Ancient Fort of Tamil Nadu, India

The fort was built by Tanjavur Maratha ruler Serfoji II (1777-1832 CE) in 1814–1815 to commemorate the successful advance of the British over Napoléon Bonaparte (15 August 1769 – 5 May 1821) in the Battle of Waterloo in 1815. The fort acted as a residence for the royal family and also as a light-house.

== Architecture ==
The fort is located in 20 km (12 mi) away from Pattukkottai and 65 km (40 mi) away from Thanjavur in a place called Sarabendrarajanpattinam in shores of Bay of Bengal. The word Manora is believed to be derived from the word minar meaning tower. The fort is hexagonal structure and has eight storeys, raising to a height of 75 ft (23 m) tapering to its top. The tower is surrounded by a wall and a moat ant it resembles a fort. The monument looks like a pagoda, with arched windows, circular staircase and eaves separating one storey from the other.

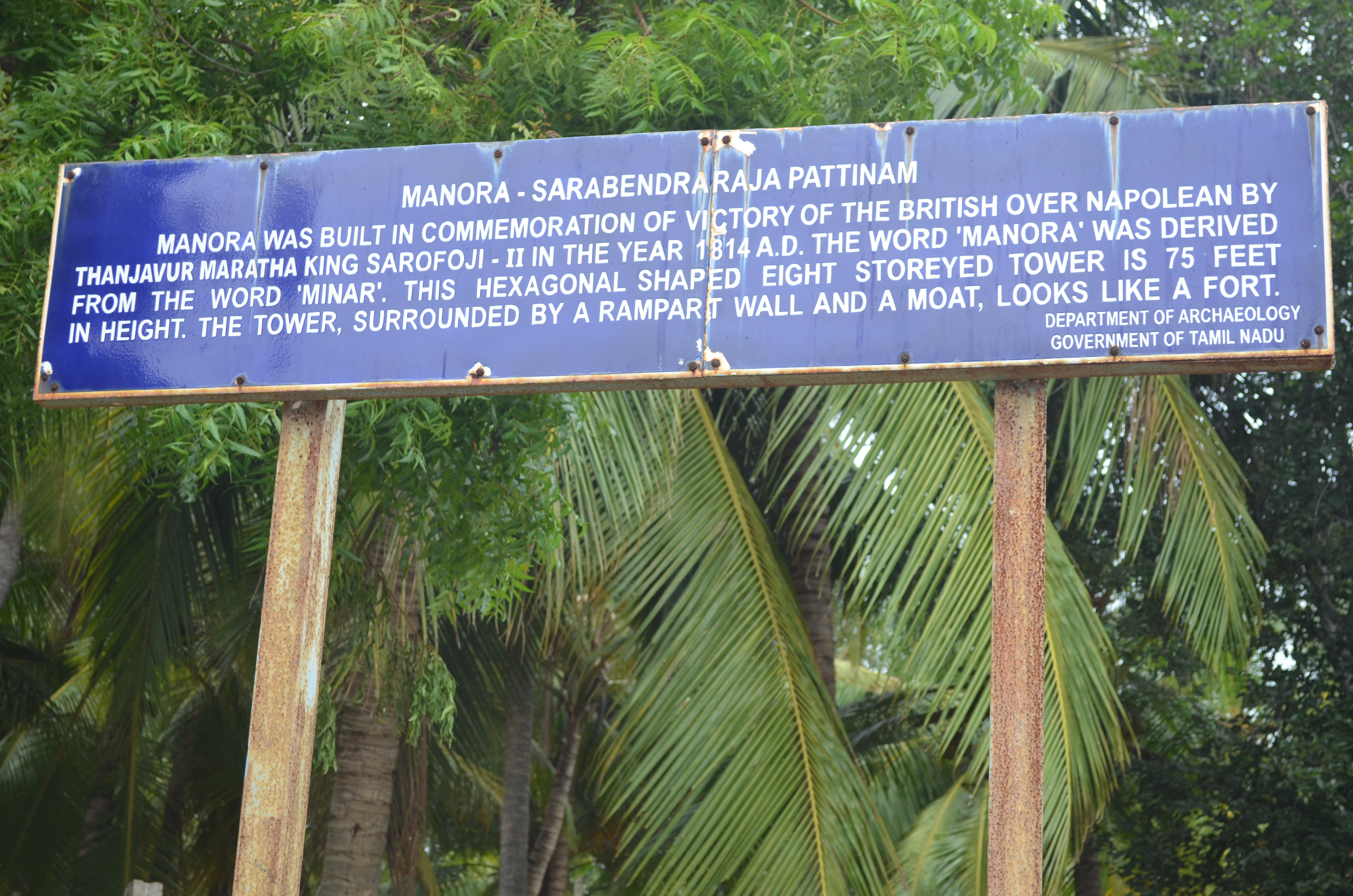
An information board at the fort

== Renovation in modern times ==
The restoration and conservation of the monument was started in 2000 and completed in 2003. Tourists are allowed access up to the second level of the fort. A considerable part of the fort was damaged during the Indian Ocean tsunami in 2004. The Tamil Nadu state Tourism Development Corporation allocated ₹3,195,000 (US$34,000) for improving the infrastructure around the fort. The project was to develop children's park to have additional facilities, provide additional lighting, install display boards, plant saplings along the road, lay new road from Sethu Road to the fort and modify thatched umbrella roof structures on the beach. The fort is one of the most prominent tourist attractions in the district.
