= Tamil Christian keerthanai =

Tamil Christian Keerthanai or kīrttaṉai (Keerthanai meaning Songs of Praise) are devotional Christian songs in Tamil. They are also referred to as "lyrics" (a genre term) by Tamils in English.

These are mostly a collection of indigenous hymns written by Protestant Tamil Christian poets. A few of them are translations of Christian hymns from other languages. They use the kīrttaṉai form that includes the classical karnatak raga (mode) and tala (rhythmic cycle) designations for each song. Some of these ragas and talas are followed in Church practice, while from the 1940s, other kīrttaṉai were adapted to simpler Western style tunes in major scale that more easily facilitated the accompaniment of organ.

These hymns were written in the early stages of Protestant Christianity in India by composers such as Vedanayagam Sastriar (1774-1864) who worked under the German Lutheran missionaries in Thanjavur Maratha kingdom. They were first published for broad use among the Protestant denominations and mission societies in 1853 by the American Congregational (ABCFM) missionary Edward Webb, in the hymn book titled Christian Lyrics for Public and Social Worship. Webb and eight of his catechists spent a couple months learning the songs from Vedanayakam Sastriar and then transmitted them orally throughout the towns and villages of the Protestant missions.
