= Mukthambal chatram =

Building in India

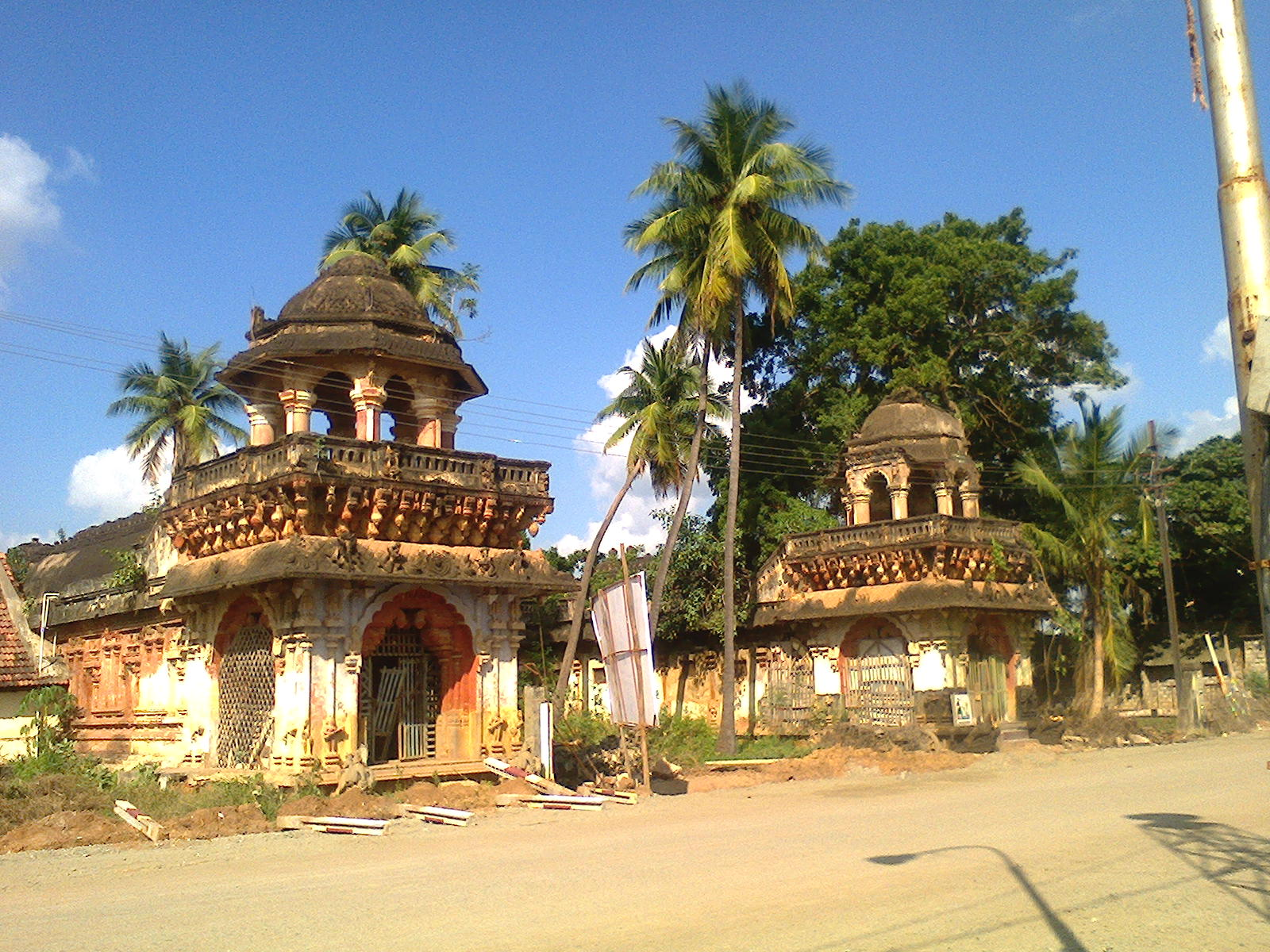
Mukthambal chatram

Mukthambal chatram is a chatram located at Orathanad, Thanjavur district, Tamil Nadu, India. This was built by Serfoji II, the Maratta king of Thanjavur.

== Location ==
This is located at Orathanad. The place where the chatram is found is known as Mukthambalpuram. According to an inscription found there, this was opened on 16 January 1802. This chatram is also known as Orathanad chatram. There is reference in Bhonsle Vamsa Sarittiram about the origin of this chatram.

== Service ==
During the period of Marattas (1743-1837 A.D.) there were 20 chatrams. Many of them were built for the wife, lover, mother, and ishtadevata of Maratta kings. They were built for public and the devotees who were going to Ramesvaram on pilgrimage, for taking rest. Foods were offered to all without any discretion. For every chatram some villages were donated as gift. On that basis, food were prepared and offered in the chatram. In those days, income up to Rs.50,000 were received through land gants from the nearby villages such as Thennamanad, Puthur, Kannanthankudi East and Vannippattu. Such type of 20 chatrams were found in Shreyas chatram at Thanjavur, Saithambal chatram at Surakkottai, Kasangula chatram at Pattukkottai, and Sethukkarai chatram at Dhanushkodi. In memory of Mukthambal a Shivalinga is kept in a room and is worshipped. Pujas are done daily to it. There were teachers who taught Tamil, Sanskrit, Telugu, Marathi, and Urdu. Treatments on Allopathy, Ayurveda, Siddha and Unani, were given to patients in order. This chatram can accommodate 5,000 persons at a time.

== Mukthambal ==
Serfoji who came to throne in 1798 A.D. had two wives. Before his marriage he married Mukthambal. When she died at young age, before death, she asked the king to build a chatram in memory of her. In order to fulfil her wish Serfoji built the chatram. The chatram had among other things Agraharam, temple, and tank.

== Architecture ==
It has massive corridors and well ventilated verandahs. Of the chatrams built by Maratta kings this is the biggest one. It is looked like a place. Ornamental works are found in it. Elephant with torana set up, entrance with the horse pulling chariot, workmanship in all places, wood pillars, well are found. Everywhere Sivalingas are found.

== Present status ==
After the British took the administration, it was used as school and hostel. Presently it is in a damaged condition. Historical enthusiasts appealed for protecting the chatram. From the latest announcement it is learnt that shortly this chatram would be declared as the protected monument by the Archaeological Department of the Government of Tamil Nadu.
