= Sarah Navaroji =

Indian evangelical preacher (1938–2014)

Sister Sarah Navaroji (12 May 1938 – 22 July 2014) was a South Indian evangelical preacher and the founder of the Zion Gospel Prayer Fellowship Church. She was one of the few influential women Christian leaders of South Indian Pentecostalism.

== Early life ==
Navaroji was born in 1938 in Madurai, India, the fourth daughter in the family. Her parents are Solomon Asirvatham and Soundaram. Navaroji’s father was a violinist and a Carnatic music teacher. He named her after the Carnatic raga Navaroj. He passed on his passion for Carnatic music to his daughters. Navaroji demonstrated her abilities in Carnatic music from the age of three. She lost her father at the age of ten, and her mother raised the four children as a single parent while teaching at a school in Madras.

== Career ==
After completing high school, Navaroji worked at the Madras Electricity Board until 1960. She resigned her position there to join the Ceylon Pentecostal Mission (CPM), Modern day TPM Church. There she was tasked with composing Tamil Christian devotional songs. In total, Navaroji composed 396 Tamil Christian devotional songs. Her songs are sung by Tamil Christians across denominations in many parts of the world. They have also been translated into Hindi, Telugu, Malayalam and Marathi. She was referred to as "the celestial singer" by evangelist D.G.S Dhinakaran. Her songs were regularly broadcast by the national radio, All India Radio. She also had a contract with His Master's Voice. They produced and distributed her music in vinyl and cassette formats.

After two years at CPM, Navaroji started a small prayer fellowship which eventually evolved into the “Zion Gospel Prayer Fellowship” church at Kilpauk, Chennai. She had no formal training in music or Bible studies or theology. She was an ardent follower of Pentecostal doctrine. Navaroji remained celibate all through her life, but spiritually, she believed to be wedded to Christ.

She also travelled extensively, preaching and holding gospel meetings in many parts of Tamil Nadu. Between 1969 and 1975, she conducted gospel meetings every summer in Madras for 7–10 days. She also travelled to many countries with Tamil diaspora. She preached the gospel through music. Many of her lyrics come straight out of Bible verses, with praises to the divine and godly wisdom for living a righteous life. Her songs unveiled the Biblical scriptures in similes and metaphors to make it easy for ordinary people, even the uneducated, to relate and understand. Many leading Christian leaders of today are a result of her ministry.

== Recognition and awards ==
In 1998, The International Institute of Church Management, Rhode Island, US, recognized Navaroji's contribution to Christian devotional music and awarded her an honorary Doctor of Divinity.

== Death ==
She died on July 22, 2014, at the age of 76.
