= Christian Friedrich Schwarz =

German missionary (1726–1798)

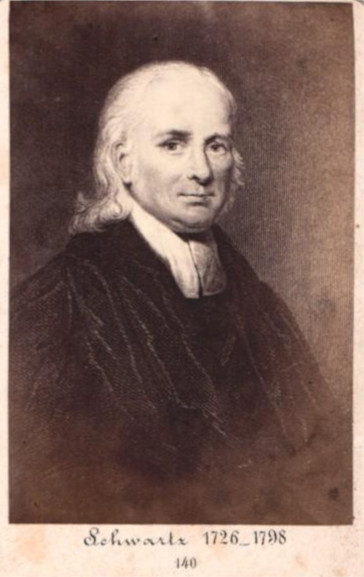

Christian Frederick Schwarz (also spelled Friedrich and surname also rendered as Schwartz or Swartz) (8 October 1726 – 13 February 1798) was a German Lutheran missionary to India. He was known for his linguistic skills, with knowledge of Latin, Greek, Hebrew, Sanskrit, Tamil, Urdu, Persian, Marathi, and Telugu. He served the British on diplomatic missions, including one to the court of Haider Ali in Mysore. Schwarz also worked alongside the Indian royal families, serving as a tutor to Raja Serfoji of Tanjore, and was influential in establishing Protestant Christianity in southern India.

== Life ==
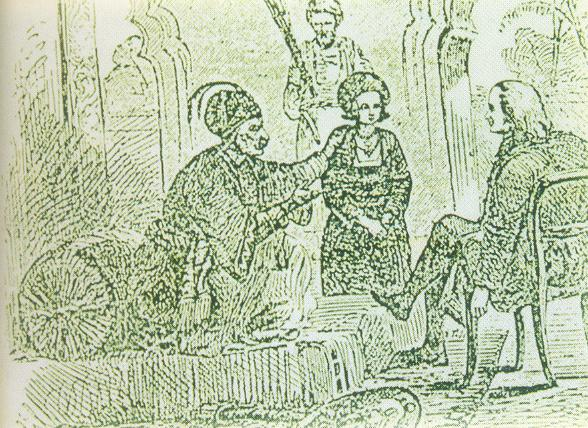
Young Serfoji II with Schwartz

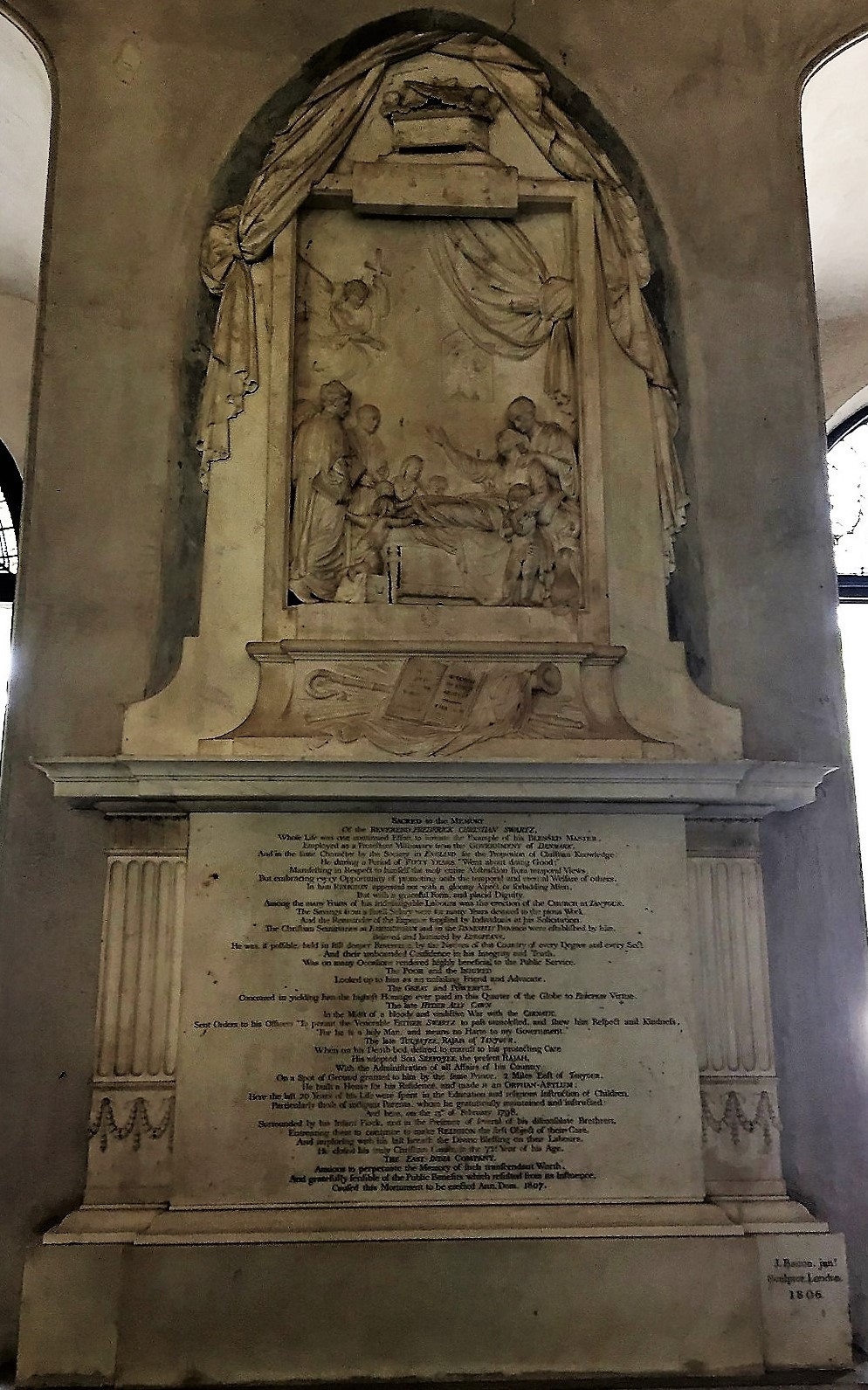
Christian Friedrich Schwarz Memorial, St. Mary's Church, Madras

Christian was born on 8 October 1726 (according to some sources 22 or 26 October) at Sonnenburg, in the electorate of Brandenburg, Prussia. His father was George Schwartz and his mother Margaret Grunerin. After several deaths in the family, his mother dedicated him to Christian service and ensured that he received training for the ministry. His mother died when he was young and he went to grammar school in Sonnenburg under Mr Helm. He learnt Latin and Greek with some amount of Hebrew which he hoped to improve by studying in the town of Custrin. In 1746 he moved to study at the University of Halle where he met Schulz who had worked in the Madras Mission. Schultz was working on Tamil bible and sought help from Schwarz. Having learned Tamil to assist in a translation of the Bible into that language, he was led to form the intention of becoming a missionary to India. He was ordained at Copenhagen on 8 August 1749, and, after spending some time in England to learn English, embarked in early 1750 for India.

Schwarz arrived at Tiruchirapalli on 30 July 1750 via Tranquebar. Although Tranquebar remained his base for some years, he made frequent visits to Thanjavur and Tiruchirapalli. In 1766 he moved to Tiruchirapalli. There he acted as chaplain to the garrison, who erected a church for his general use.

Following an explosion at the East India Company's ammunition depot in 1761, in which many Indian soldiers were killed, Schwarz established the Bishop Heber School in Trichinopoly for the soldiers' orphaned children. After a second explosion in 1763, which killed British soldiers and their wives, he opened another school in the vestry of St. John's Church for the surviving children. The school was later relocated to a larger site adjoining the garrison after land was provided by the army and Freemasons.

In 1769, he secured the friendship of the king Raja Tuljaji, who, although he never converted to Christianity, permitted Schwarz to preach freely in his kingdom. Shortly before his death, he committed to Schwarz the education of his adopted son and successor Sarabhoji (Serfoji). Schwarz taught the prince, Prince Serfoji, and another slightly older pupil Vedanayagam, using the gurukulam approach, where the teacher and the pupil live together. Serfoji later built a church in Schwarz' honour.

In 1779, Schwarz undertook, at the request of the British authorities in Madras (present day Chennai), a private embassy to Hyder Ali, the ruler of Mysore. When Hyder invaded the Carnatic, Schwarz was allowed to pass through the enemy's camp without harassment. In 1784 he established an English school in Thanjavur and this school is now known as St. Peter's Higher Secondary School. After twelve years in Tiruchirapalli he moved to Thanjavur, where he spent the remainder of his life. He died on 13 February 1798 just before Serfoji II ascended the throne. He was laid to rest in St.Peter's Church in Maharnonbuchavadi, Thanjavur. In his tomb there is a tombstone with a short memoir and an elegy in English written by Serfoji II.

== Legacy ==
Schwarz was among the most successful early Protestant missionaries in India and established congregations across southern India. The raja of Tanjore erected a monument carved by John Flaxman in the mission church, in which he is represented as grasping the hand of the dying missionary and receiving his benediction. A monument to Schwarz by John Bacon was placed by the British East India Company in St Mary's church at Chennai. Schwarz High School in Ramanathapuram has produced notable students, among them Dr. Abdul Kalam, the former President of India.

The following is the wording of the Memorial commissioned by Maha Raja Serfoji

“To the memory of the Reverend Christian Frederic Swartz. Born at Sonnenburg of Neumark in the Kingdom of Prussia, the 26th of October 1726, and died at Tanjore the 13th of February 1798, in the 72d Year of his age. Devoted from his Early Manhood to the Office of Missionary in the East, the similarity of his situation to that of the first preachers of the gospel, produced in him a peculiar resemblance to the simple sanctity of the apostolic character. His natural vivacity won the affection as his unspotted probity and purity of life alike commanded the reverence of the Christian, Mahomedan and Hindu. For sovereign princes, Hindu, and Mahomeden selected this humble pastor as the medium of political negotiations with the British Government.”

Memorial to Schwartz by John Flaxman, commissioned by Serfoji II, Raja of Tanjore, at the CSI Schwartz Church, Tanjore

Replica of the Schwartz Memorial at the Tanjore Palace Museum

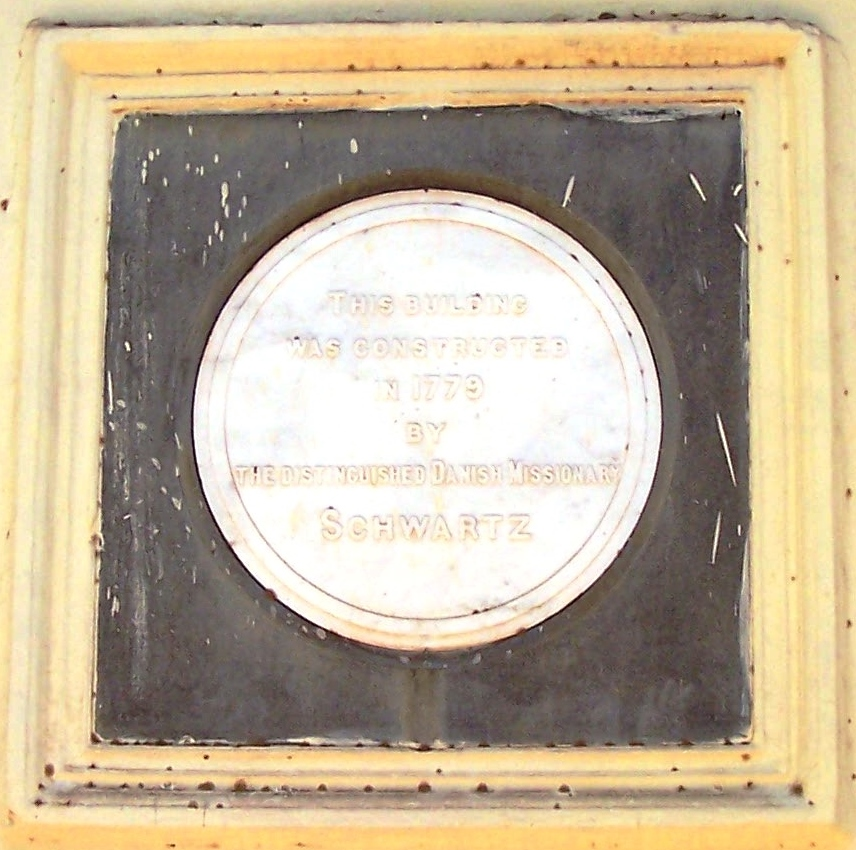
Memorial Stone at the CSI Schwartz Memorial Church, Tanjore

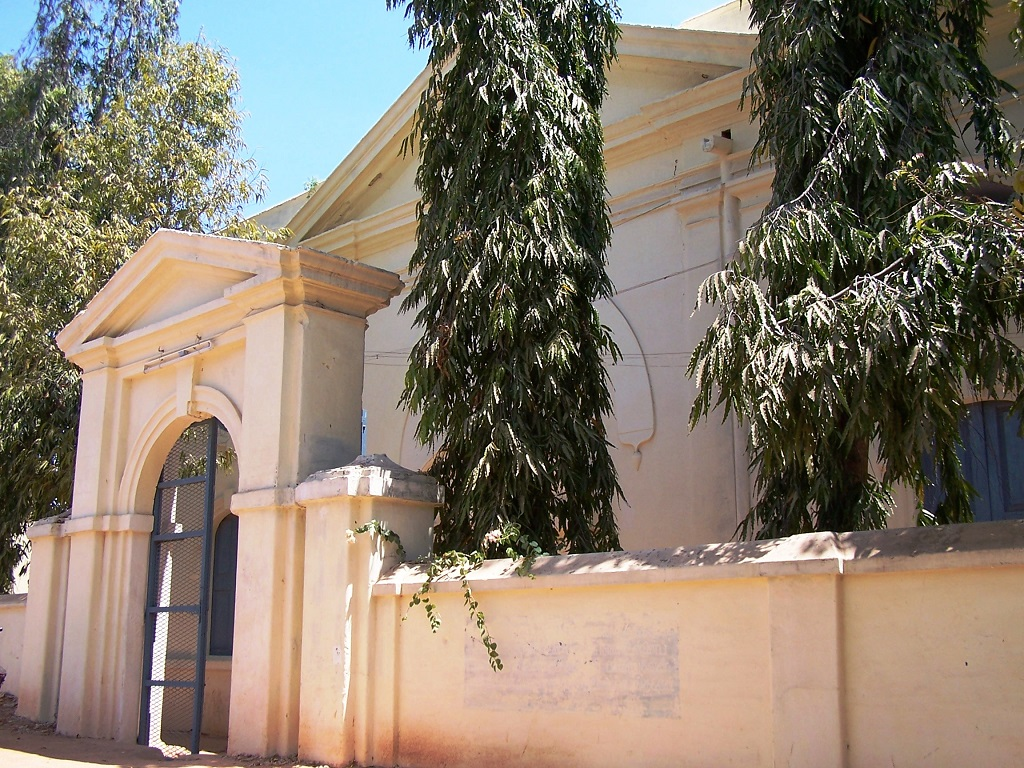
CSI Schwartz Memorial Church, Tanjore

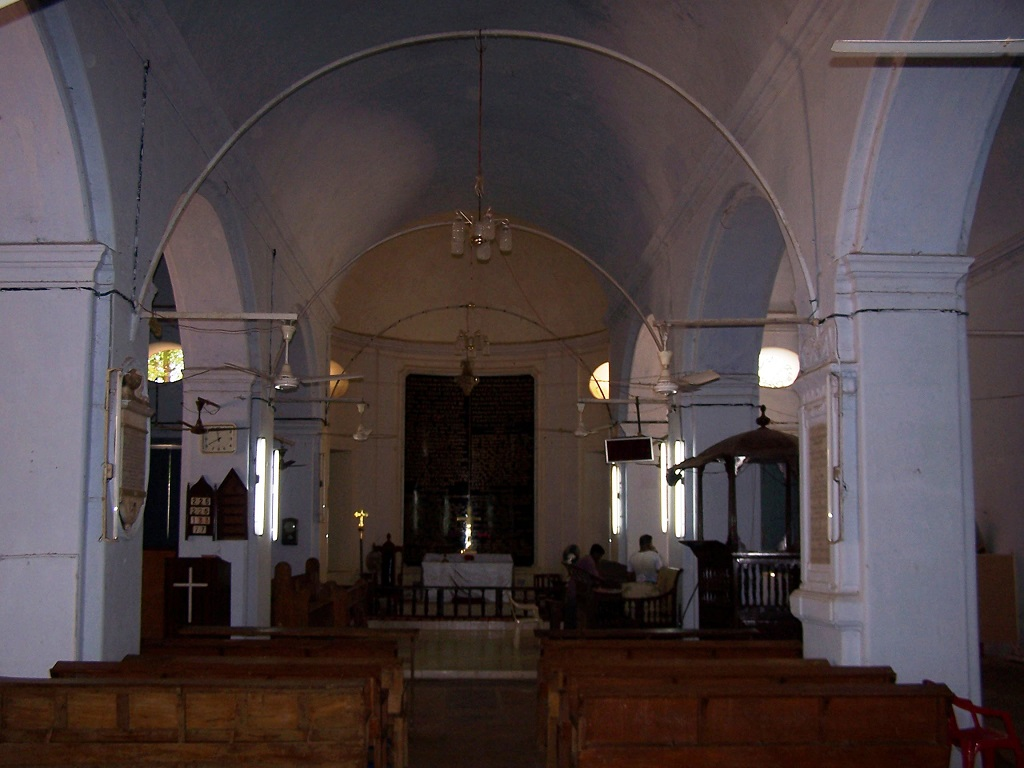
Interiors of the CSI Schwartz Memorial Church, Tanjore

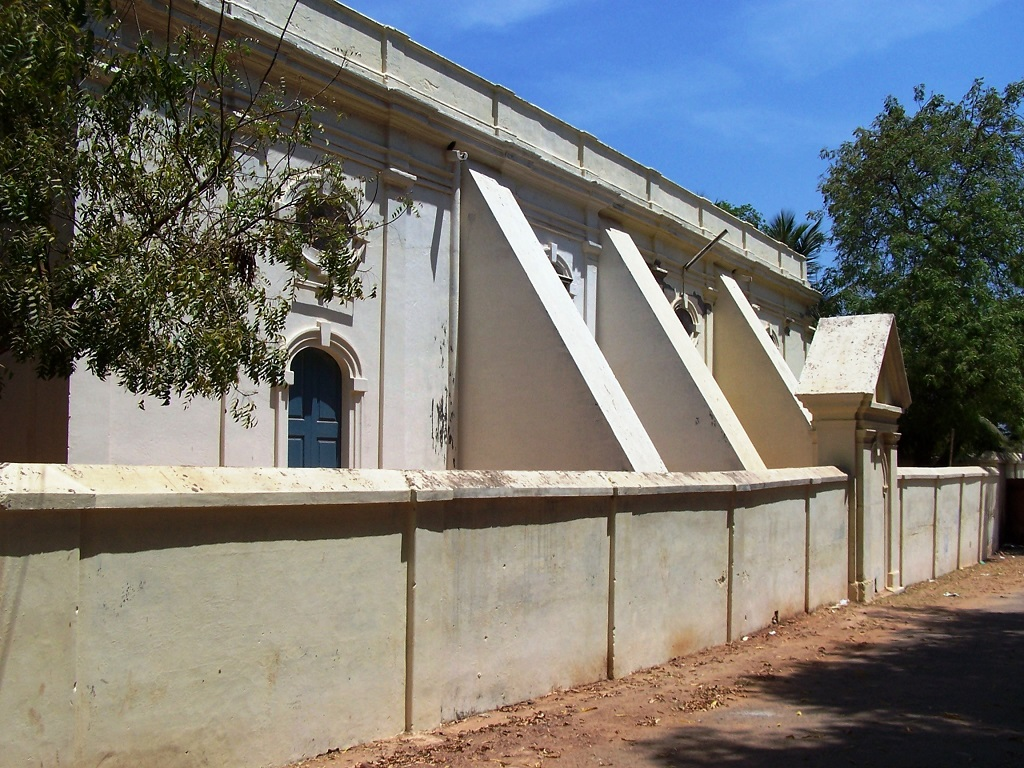
Side View of the CSI Schwartz Memorial Church, Tanjore
