= Manigramam, Tamil Nadu =

Manigramam ta Maninagar
- village
- Location in Tamil Nadu, India Manigramam (India)
- Coordinates: 11°09′27″N 79°48′50″E
- Country: India
- State: Tamil Nadu
- District: Mayiladuthurai

Languages
  - Official: Tamil
- Time zone: UTC+5:30 (IST)
- PIN: 609114
- Telephone code: 04364
- Nearest city: Mayiladuthurai, Sirkazhi
- Lok Sabha constituency: Mayiladuthurai
- Vidhan Sabha constituency: Poompuhar

Manigramam is a village in Mayiladuthurai district in the southern Indian state of Tamil Nadu. It is located 25 km from Mayiladuthurai (Mayuram), 18 km from Sirkali, 5 km from Poompuhar, 2 km from Thiruvengadu. Famous Thirumani Azhagar temple is located in this village. Other than this, Mariyamman temple, Ayyanar Kovil with Madurai Veeran, Pirai Veeran temple, Mosque and Church decorate the village.

Nearest railway station: Sirkazhi, Mayiladuthurai
Nearest airport: Tiruchy
