= Thuljaji =

Raja of Thanjavur Maratha kingdom from 1763–1773 and 1776-1787

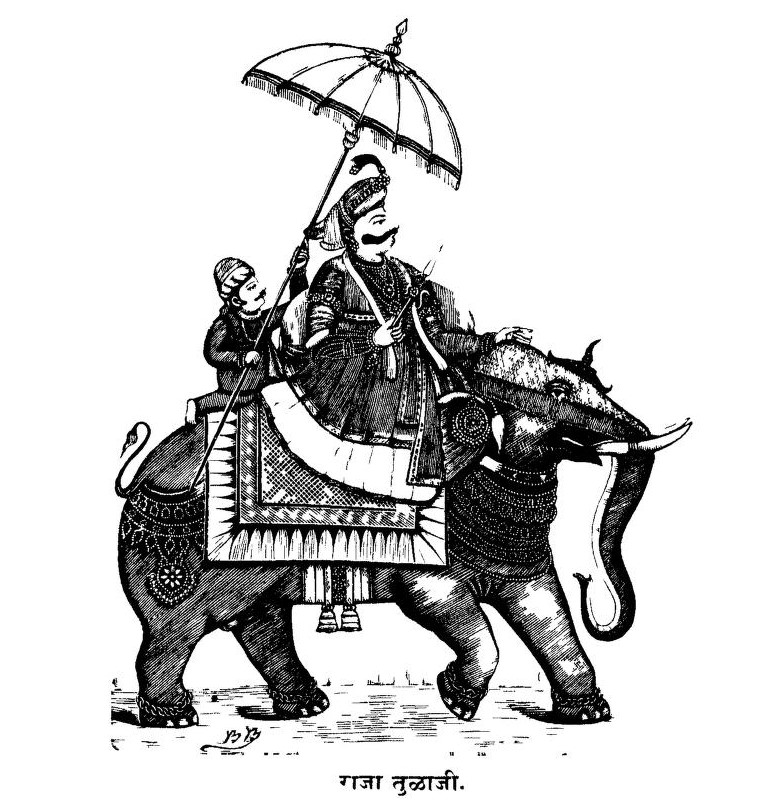

Raja of Thanjavur
- Reign: 1763 to 1773 and 1776 to 1787
- Predecessor: Pratap singh
- Successor: Serfoji II
- Born: 1738
- Died: 1787 (aged 48–49)
- House: Bhonsle
- Father: Pratapsingh of Thanjavur
- Religion: Hinduism

Thuljaji Bhonsle (Marathi: तुळजाजी, also known as Tullasu Rasa) (1738–1787) was the eldest son of Pratap Singh and the ruler of Thanjavur Bhonsle dynasty from 1763 to 1773 and 1776 to 1787. He was a weak-hearted ruler despite being extremely generous. His period is known for the treaties which made Thanjavur subordinate to the British East India Company.

== Invasion of Ramnad and the Occupation of the Nawab of the Carnatic ==
In 1771, Thuljaji invaded the dominion of the Polygar of Ramnad who had wrested Hanumantagudi from Thanjavur during the reign of Pratapsingh. The Raja of Ramnad was a dependent of the Nawab of Carnatic and this act of aggression by Thuljaji forced the Nawab to interfere. The Nawab and the East India company laid siege to Tanjore, and forced the Raj to surrender. A humiliating treaty was forced upon the Raja and was later ratified by the officials of the British East India Company. Eighty lakhs of arrears had to be paid apart from a war indemnity of thirty-two lakhs. Thuljaji also ceded two Subhas of Thanjavur to the Nawab. Arni and Hanumantagudi were taken from the Raja's hands and Thanjavur was to have the same foreign policy as the kingdom of the Nawab.

Humiliated and shaken by the provisions of the treaty, Thuljaji applied to the Peshwa for help. A large army commanded by Raghoba was dispatched to help Thuljaji. But court intrigues at Satara forced him to turn back. Thanjavur was taken by the forces of the Nawab of Carnatic and Thuljaji was deposed. Thanjavur loathed under the rule of the Nawab for three years (from 1773 to 1776).

== Restoration ==
In 1776, the Board of Directors of the British East India Company ordered the restoration of Thuljaji. However, soon after his restoration a treaty was forced upon him by which he became a mere vassal of the British. His army was disbanded and replaced with Company troops. He was to pay regular tribute to both the Nawab and the Company.

== The Second Mysore War ==
The Second Mysore War broke out in 1780 between Hyder Ali and the Company. The very next year, along with his son Tipu Sultan he invaded Thanjavur. The Mysore army was in occupation of the kingdom for 6 months. The region was plundered and the people carried away. The missionary Schwartz records the abduction of 20,000 children from Thanjavur by Tipu Sultan in the year 1784 alone. The produce fell and a calamity ensued. Thanjavur did not recover from the impact of Tipu's invasion till the beginning of the 19th century.

== Literature ==
Thuljaji was a fine writer and could compose in Sanskrit as well as Telugu and Marathi. He conferred the title of Andhra Kalidasa on poet Aluri Kuppana. Kuppana wrote classics such as Acharyavijayamu, Panchanada Sthalapurana, Yakshaganas of Ramayana and the Bhagavata, Parana Bhagavatacharitra, Indumati Parinaya and Karmavipaka.

Thuljaji was tolerant of other faiths and religions. He confided upon a Christian missionary called Schwartz who hoped to convert Thuljaji to Christianity. Thuljaji however remained a devout Hindu, drawn deeply to the Saivism sect.

== Death ==
Thuljaji died in 1787 at age 49 leaving behind an impoverished state. Two of his queens committed Sati. As two of his sons had predeceased him, he had adopted Serfoji from a collateral branch of the Bhonsle family. Serfoji II ascended the throne at the age of 10 with Thuljaji's brother Amarsingh as regent.

== See also ==
- Bhonsle
- Maratha Empire
- List of Maratha dynasties and states
- Thanjavur Maratha kingdom
- Tipu Sultan
- Nawab of Carnatic

== Footnotes ==
Preceded by Pratapsingh	Maratha Raja of Thanjavur; 1763–1787	Succeeded by Serfoji II
