= Serfoji II =

Raja of Thanjavur Maratha kingdom from 1787 to 1793 and 1798-1832

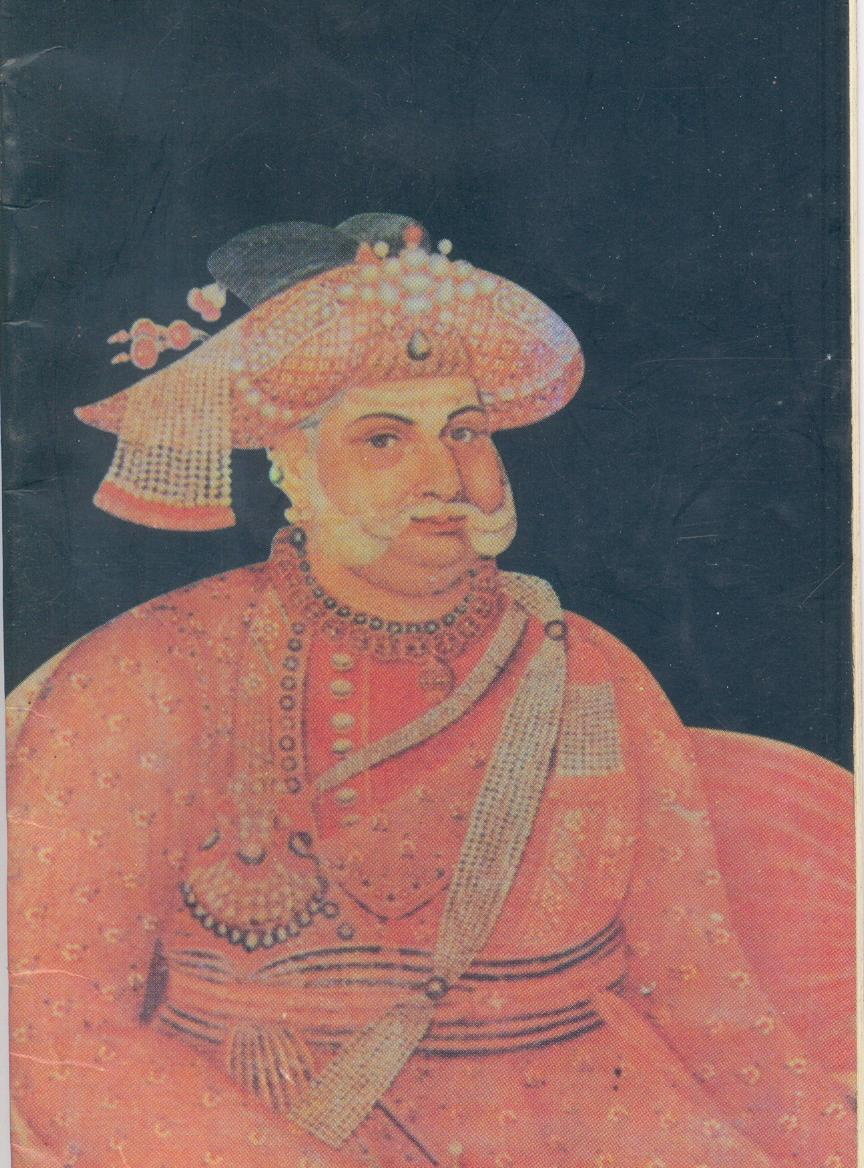

Raja of Thanjavur
- Reign: 1787 – 1793 (1st reign); 29 June 1798 – 7 March 1832 (2nd reign)
- Coronation: 1787 (Date unknown); 29 June 1798
- Predecessor: Thuljaji; Amar Singh (usurper)
- Successor: Amar Singh (usurper); Shivaji II
- Born: 24 September 1777; Unknown
- Died: 7 March 1832 (aged 54); Thanjavur
- Burial: Thanjavur
- Consort: Muktambal
- Issue: Shivaji
Names
- Serfoji Raja Bhonsle Chattrpathi
- House: Bhonsle
- Dynasty: Maratha Dynasty

Serfoji II (Tamil: இரண்டாம் சரபோஜி ராஜா போன்ஸ்லே, Marathi: शरभोजी राजे भोसले (दुसरे)) (24 September 1777 – 7 March 1832), also known as Sarabhoji II Bhonsle, was the last sovereign ruler of the Maratha principality of Thanjavur. He ruled from 1787 to 1793, and again from 1798 until his death in 1832. He was adopted by the previous ruler, Thulaja, and was subsequently nominated as his successor.

During his reign, administrative powers were transferred to the British East India Company, rendering him and his descendants titular Maharajas of Thanjavur. He belonged to the Maratha Bhonsle dynasty.

Serfoji II is remembered for his patronage of art and culture, as well as for his notable contributions to the field of ophthalmology.

== Early life ==
Serfoji was born on 24 September 1777 into the Bhonsle royal house, a lineage tracing back to Shivaji I. On 23 January 1787, he was formally adopted by King Thuljaji, the then ruler of Thanjavur. His education was entrusted to the Danish missionary Christian Friedrich Schwarz. Following Thuljaji's death, his half-brother Amar Singh—who had earlier been appointed regent for the young Serfoji—usurped the throne in 1793. During Amar Singh's rule, Serfoji was denied access to formal education.

Christian Schwarz intervened and arranged for Serfoji to be sent to Madras, where he continued his education under Wilhelm Gericke of the Lutheran Mission. From 1793 to 1797, Serfoji studied at the Civilian Orphan Asylum (now St. George's School) located on Poonamalle High Road, Chennai. He eventually became proficient in multiple languages, including Tamil, Telugu, Urdu, Sanskrit, French, German, Danish, Greek, Dutch, and Latin.

On 23 June 1798, the British intervened and restored Serfoji to the throne. However, under the terms of the Treaty of 1799, the administration of the Thanjavur kingdom was transferred entirely to the British East India Company. Serfoji retained limited authority over the Thanjavur Fort and its immediate surroundings. In return, he received one-fifth of the state's land revenue and an annual pension of 100,000 star pagodas.

== Reign and administration ==
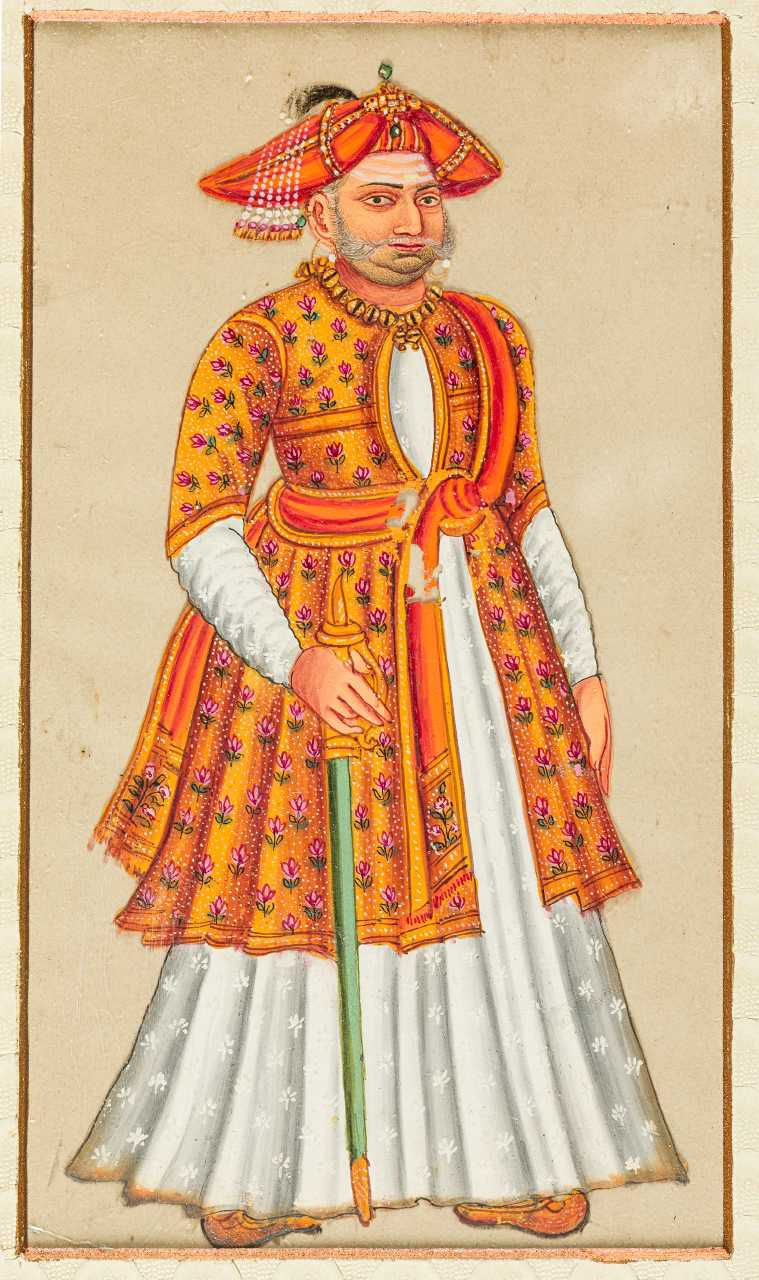
Serfoji II miniature painting. National Museum, Copenhagen

During Serfoji II's reign, which lasted from 1798 until his death in 1832, the proceedings of the Thanjavur Durbar were documented in writing for the first time. The delta region was divided into five districts, each administered by a Subedar. A strong advisory board comprising six learned individuals was established, many of whom later served as administrative heads of the five districts. Agricultural lands yielded significant revenue, and the judicial system was noted for its efficiency and effectiveness.

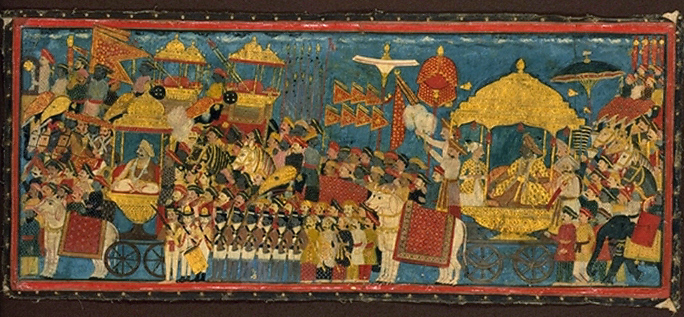
Tanjore painting of a royal procession: Maharaja Amarasimha and Serfoji From the collection of the V&A Museum.

Serfoji is also credited with constructing several chatrams ou choultries (rest houses) for travelling pilgrims. These establishments offered free accommodation, food, and essential services, with the State overseeing their management. Among the notable chatrams built during his reign were three prominent ones, including a significant facility at Orathanadu, the Mukthambal chatram.

=== Contribution to the Sarasvati Mahal Library ===
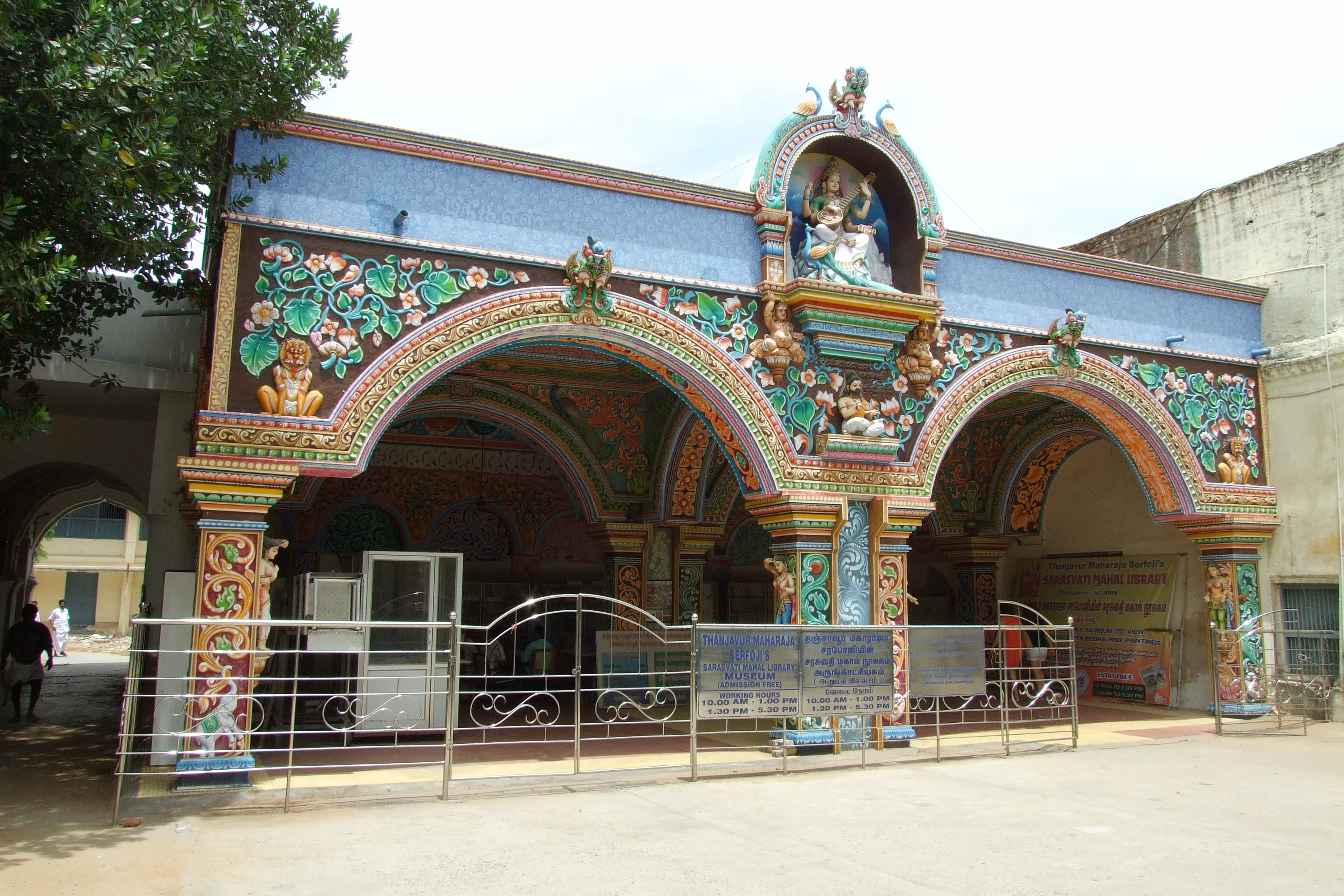
Entrance of the Sarasvati Mahal Library, Tanjore, Tamil Nadu, India.

The Sarasvati Mahal Library, originally established as a palace library by the Nayak kings of Thanjavur (1535–1675), was significantly enriched during the reign of Serfoji II. A keen bibliophile, Serfoji greatly expanded the library's collection by acquiring rare works, maps, dictionaries, coins, and artworks from various parts of the world.

He is reported to have purchased approximately 4,000 books, enhancing the library with a wide range of subjects. Medical treatises in the collection often include his annotations in English. The library also houses treatises on Vedanta, grammar, music, dance, drama, architecture, astronomy, medicine, and the training of elephants and horses.

Serfoji established the first Devanagari printing press in South India, which utilised stone type. He commissioned several scholars, including Aarur Swami Anirudra Thyagarajar Iyer and Pudukottai Adhi Nayagam Pillai, to travel extensively and collect manuscripts and books. Most of the volumes in the collection bear Serfoji's personal autograph in English.

Serfoji was known for his religious tolerance and open-mindedness. He generously supported churches and educational institutions operated by Christian missionaries. He was also a patron of the Thanjavur Bade Hussein Dargah.

In addition to manuscripts, the library preserves Modi documents, which are records of daily court proceedings in the Maratha administration, as well as French–Maratha correspondence from the 18th century.

The Encyclopædia Britannica, in its global survey of libraries, referred to the Sarasvati Mahal Library as "perhaps the most remarkable library in India".

The library is located within the Tanjore Palace complex and was opened to the public in 1918. A small museum is also maintained on the premises for visitors.

=== Educational reforms ===
Serfoji II established a school named Navavidhya Kalanidhi Sala, where a wide range of subjects were taught, including languages, literature, sciences, arts and crafts, along with the Vedas and shastras. He maintained close ties with the Danes at Tarangambadi (Tranquebar), frequently visiting their schools and appreciating their methods of education. Inspired by the European model, he sought to introduce similar educational reforms across his kingdom.

In 1805, Serfoji set up a stone-type printing press called the Nava Vidya Kalasala Varnayantra, which was the first in South India to use the Devanagari script. The press was intended to publish European literary and scientific works for wider circulation in the region. According to reports, Sir Alexander Johnston, then Chief Justice of Ceylon, requested a publication from this press and, in response, received a Marathi translation of Aesop's Fables.

=== Civic amenities ===
Serfoji II undertook several public welfare initiatives during his reign. He constructed ten water tanks and numerous wells for civic use, aiming to improve water accessibility for the residents. Additionally, he implemented an underground drainage system for the entire city of Thanjavur, significantly enhancing urban sanitation and hygiene.

=== Medicine ===
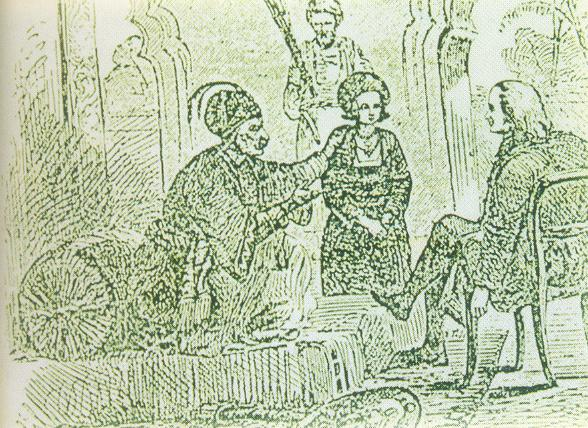
Young Serfoji with Schwatz

Serfoji II established the Dhanavantari Mahal, a research institution dedicated to the preparation of herbal medicines for both humans and animals. The institution also functioned as a medical treatment centre and maintained detailed case-sheets, which later gained recognition for their systematic documentation.

At Dhanavantari Mahal, physicians from various schools of medicine—including modern medicine, Ayurveda, Unani, and Siddha—conducted research on medicinal herbs and treatments. Their collective efforts resulted in the compilation of eighteen volumes of research material. Serfoji also commissioned the study and classification of important medicinal herbs, which were documented through detailed hand-painted illustrations.

Based on the medical prescriptions preserved at Dhanavantari Mahal, a series of poems were composed, outlining various treatment procedures for different diseases. These poems were later compiled and published under the title Sarabhendra Vaidhya Muraigal.

=== Ophthalmology ===
In September 2003, during a meeting between Dr. S.S. Badrinath and Shivaji Rajah Bhonsle—the present scion of the Thanjavur royal family and sixth in line from King Serfoji II—the existence of 200-year-old manuscripts in the Sarasvati Mahal Library came to light. These manuscripts contain detailed records of ophthalmic surgical procedures believed to have been performed by Serfoji II himself.

Serfoji II is known to have regularly carried a surgical kit and is reported to have performed cataract surgeries. His medical operations were meticulously documented in English, including detailed case histories of the patients he treated. These records now form an important part of the archival collection at the Sarasvati Mahal Library.

=== Zoological garden ===
Serfoji II established the first zoological garden in Tamil Nadu within the premises of the Thanjavur Palace.

=== Shipping ===
Serfoji II established a shipyard at Manora, located approximately fifty kilometres from Thanjavur, to promote maritime activity and trade. He also set up a meteorological station to aid navigation and commercial operations. In addition, he maintained a gun factory, a naval library, and a naval store equipped with various navigational instruments.

Serfoji was also known for his diverse personal interests. He took a keen interest in painting, gardening, coin collecting, and martial arts. He patronised chariot racing, hunting, and bullfighting as part of his courtly leisure pursuits.

=== Contribution to arts and music ===
Serfoji II was a notable patron of traditional Indian arts, including classical dance and music. He authored several literary works, such as Kumarasambhava Champu, Mudrarakshaschaya, and Devendra Kuravanji. He also introduced Western musical instruments like the clarinet and violin into Carnatic music, encouraging their integration into traditional compositions.

Serfoji is often credited with inaugurating and popularising the distinctive Thanjavur style of painting, which became widely recognised for its rich colours, intricate details, and use of gold foil.

=== Construction and renovation activities ===
During the reign of Serfoji II, several significant architectural works were undertaken. The five-storey Sarjah Mahadi within the Thanjavur Palace complex and the Manora Fort Tower at Saluvanayakanpattinam were constructed under his patronage. He also installed lightning rods atop these monuments as a safety measure.

Serfoji commissioned the inscription of the history of the Bhonsle dynasty on the south-western wall of the Brihadeeswara Temple in Thanjavur. This inscription is regarded as one of the longest historical inscriptions in the world.

In addition to constructing new temples, Serfoji also undertook the renovation and restoration of several existing temples, including the Brihadeeswara Temple. A known philanthropist, Serfoji was also a member of the Royal Asiatic Society, contributing to scholarly and cultural endeavours of the time.

=== Pilgrimage to Kasi ===
In 1820–21, Serfoji II undertook a pilgrimage to Kasi (Benares or Varanasi), accompanied by a retinue of 3,000 disciples and camp-followers. During the journey, he halted at various locations, distributing alms to the poor and engaging in charitable activities. He also contributed to the renovation of several sacred sites along the route.

The memory of this pilgrimage endures through paintings commissioned by Serfoji, depicting the bathing ghats of the Ganges and other important holy places visited during his journey.

== Death ==
Serfoji II died on 7 March 1832, after a reign spanning nearly four decades—his first reign lasted from 1787 to 1793, and the second from 1798 until his death in 1832. His demise was widely mourned across the kingdom, and it is reported that over 90,000 people attended his funeral procession.

== Legacy ==
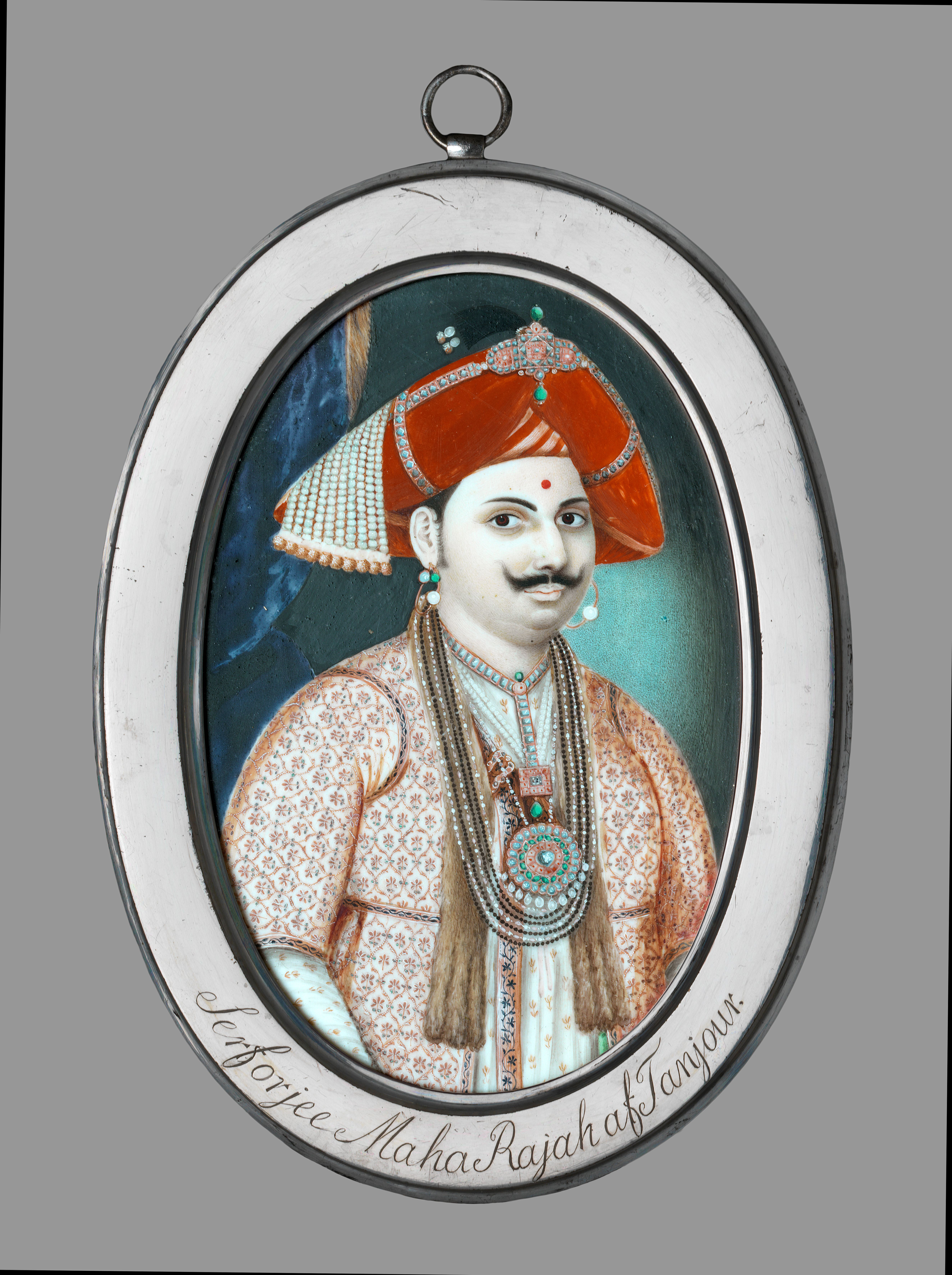
Miniature painting on ivory, silver frame with engraving in the National Museum of Denmark,. Unknown Indian artist, c. 1800.

In the history of pre-Victorian India, Serfoji II is often remembered as a progressive and enlightened ruler. He was a scholar, humanist, and visionary, widely regarded as being ahead of his time. Under his rule, Thanjavur emerged as one of the most developed princely states in the Indian subcontinent.

While many contemporary rulers were preoccupied with warfare and internal conflicts, Serfoji focused on establishing peace, promoting prosperity, and encouraging scientific and educational advancement. He introduced several administrative and educational reforms, which contributed to the overall progress of the state. His efforts helped Thanjavur transition into a modern era, placing it on par with many contemporary European states in terms of governance and intellectual achievements.

Serfoji II is also remembered for his exceptional erudition. Fluent in both Latin and Sanskrit, and equally adept in Tamil and English, he was a symbol of cultural synthesis and intellectual versatility—an embodiment of the enlightened Indian maharajah during the British colonial era.

At his funeral, Reverend Bishop Heber, a visiting missionary, remarked:

I have seen many crowned heads, but not one whose deportment was more princely.

== See also ==
- Bhonsle
- Maratha Empire
- List of Maratha dynasties and states
- Thanjavur Maratha kingdom

Preceded by Thuljaji II	Maratha Raja of Thanjavur has been deleted. 1787–179	Succeeded by Amar Singh
Preceded by Amar Singh	Maratha Raja of Thanjavur (Restored); 1798–1832	Succeeded by Shivaji II
