= Ganapati Bhat =

Hindustani singer

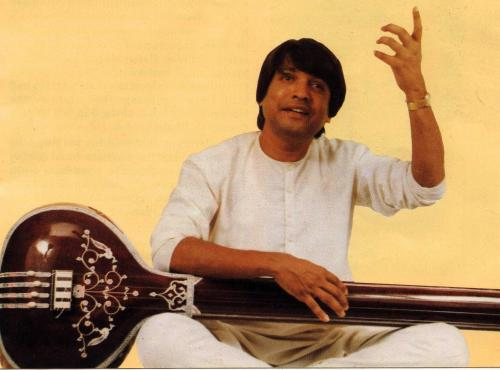
Image of Pt ganapati bhat

Pandit Ganapati Bhat, popularly known as Ganapati Bhat Hasanagi, is an Indian Hindustani classical vocalist. He belongs to Kirana -Gwalior Gharana. He is a resident guru at Dr. Gangubai Hangal Gurukul Trust in Hubli. He was born and brought up in Hasanagi, a small village in the state of Karnataka in India.

== Career ==
Pandit Ganapati Bhat is a disciple of Basavaraj Rajguru, the maestro from Dharwad whose gayaki (singing style) is based on the Kirana, the Gwalior and the Patiala gharanas. Bhat trained under Rajguru from 1966 to 1991. Bhat started his training in music as a sitarist, but was drawn to Hindustani vocal music. Later, he studied with C. R. Vyas, an exponent of the Gwalior Gharana

Pandit Ganapati Bhat was recognised as a B-High grade artist of the All India Radio in 1979. Thereafter, he was recognised with the highest, A-Grade in 1988.

Pandit Ganapati Bhat was Member of Karnataka Sangeet Nritya Academy, Karnataka Government, from 1995 to 1998. He was recognised as a research supervisor in music by the Kannada University, Hampi, in 2001. He was member of the HRD Music Expert Committee, Government of India, New Delhi, from 2001 to 2003. He is also a member of the Akashvani Audition Committee, All India Radio, Dharwad and a member of the examination committee, Post Graduate Music Department, Karnataka University, Dharwad, 2007.

In 2011, he was selected to the position of the Guru, of the Dr. Gangubai Hangal National Gurukul, Hubli, along with noted Hindustani musicians, Pt. Maniprasad, Pt. Kedar Narayan Bodas, Vid. Vijaya Jadhav Gatlewar, and Pt. Kaivalya Kumar Gurav.

== Music pedagogy ==
Since 1980, Pandit Ganapati Bhat has been imparting Hindustani music training in the traditional Gurukual method in his village Hasanagi in Uttar Kannada District, Karnataka.

== Awards and recognition ==
- Karnataka Rajyotsava Award in 1993 by the Government of Karnataka
- Karnataka Sangeeta Nritya Akademi Award in 2007, by the Karnataka Sangeeta Nritya Akademi, Government of Karnataka
- Vatsalabai Bhimsen Joshi Award in 2006 by the Arya Prasarak Mandal Pune, headed by Pt. Bhimsen Joshi
- Puttaraj Gawai award in 2015
- Sawai Gandharva Puraskar in 2016
- Nijaguna Purandara Award in 2017
- Pandit Basavaraj Rajguru National Award in 2020, by the Pt. Basavaraj Rajguru National Memorial Trust
- Tansen Award in 2023 (for year 2022), by the Department of culture, Government of Madhya Pradesh
