= Sanhita Nandi =

- Occupations: Hindustani Classical vocalist, Kirana Gharana
- Website: sanhitanandi.com

Sanhita Nandi is a prominent Hindustani classical vocalist of the Kirana Gharana. The central motif of her style is slow tempo raga development (voice culture, voice throw, and tonal application) and ornamented sargams. She is getting guidance under Mashkoor Ali Khan.

== Early life ==
Sanhita Nandi was trained under the late A. Kanan of Kirana Gharana, the senior most guru at the ITC Sangeet Research Academy.

== Career ==
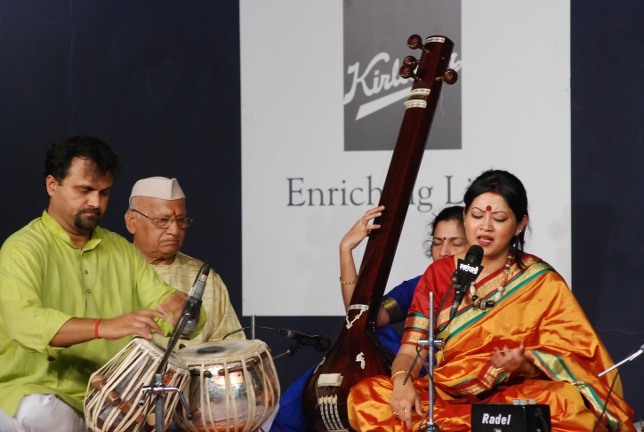
Sanhita Nandi performing in Sawai Gandharva in Pune

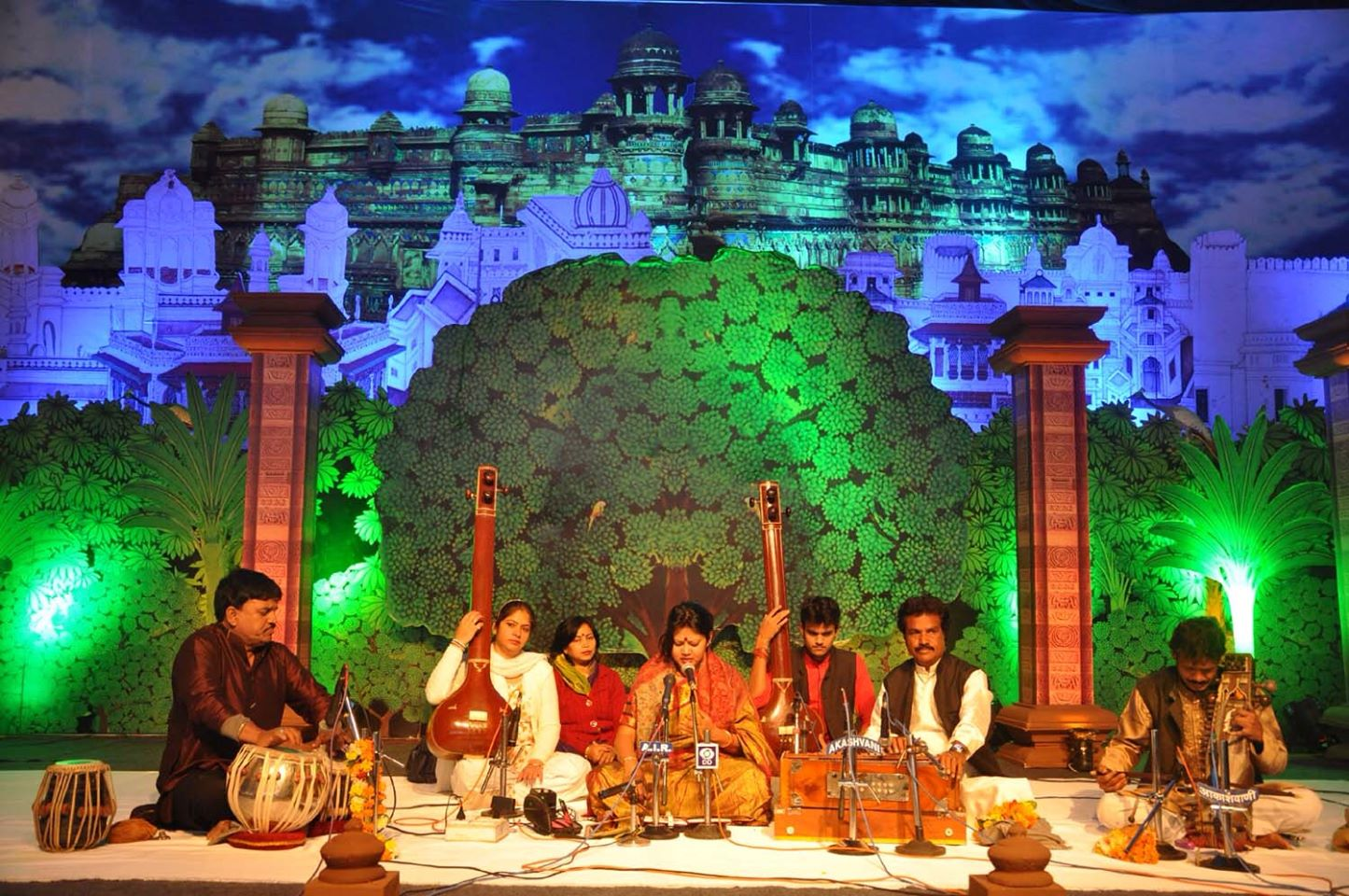
Sanhita Nandi performing in Tansen Sangeet Samaroh in Gwalior

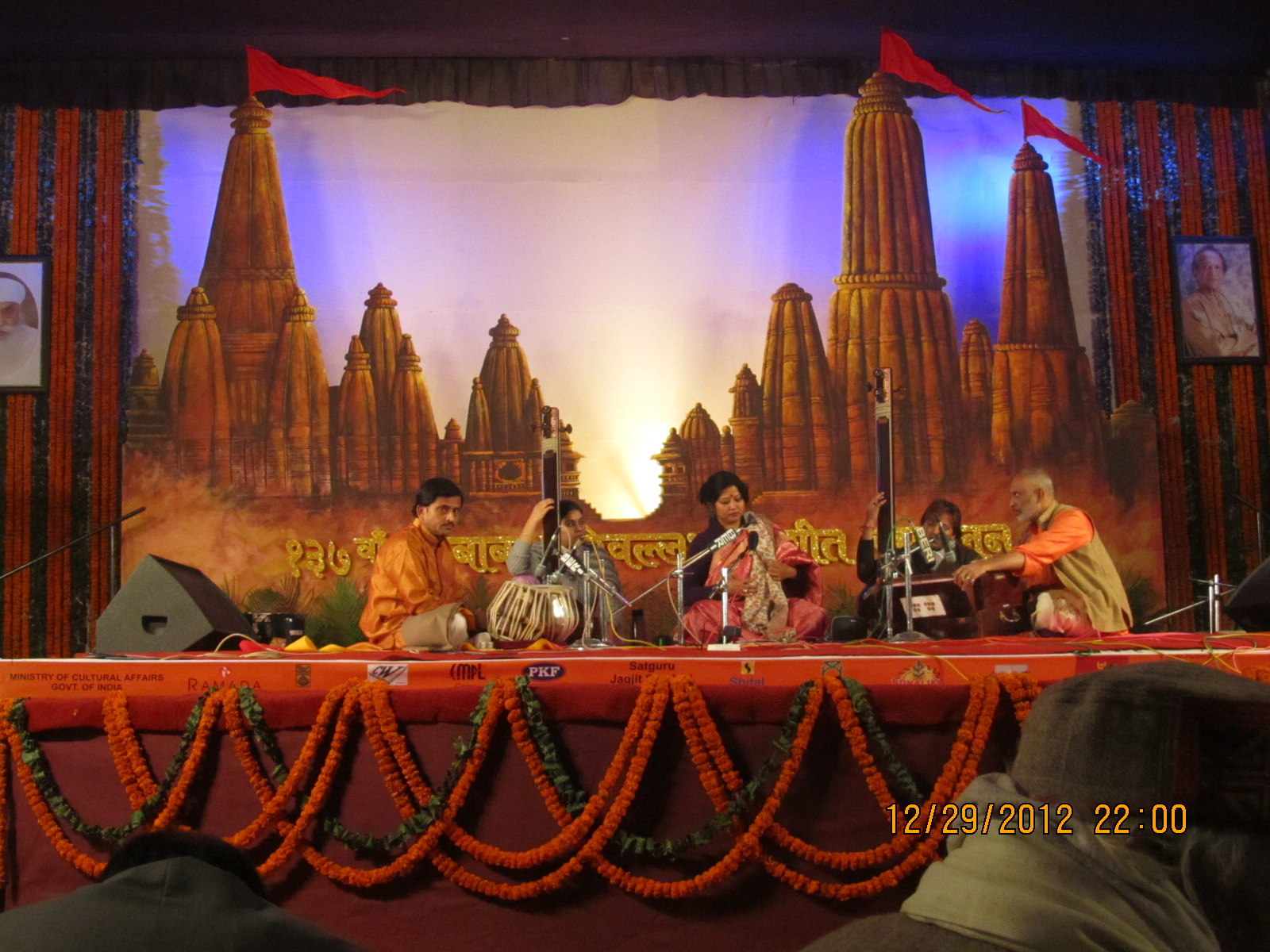
Sanhita Nandi performing in Harballabh Sangeet Sammelan

Sanhita Nandi has travelled extensively to perform, both within and outside of India. She has been invited to perform at music festivals such as Sawai Gandharva Music Festival, Tansen Samaroh in Gwalior, Saptak Festival of Music in Ahmedabad, Harballabh Sangeet Sammelan in Jalandhar, ITC Sangeet Research Academy in Kolkata, SPIC MACAY, Gururao Deshpande Sangeet Sabha in Bangalore, Laxmi Narayan Sangeet Samaroha in Amritsar, Parampara Dance and Music Festival in Chennai, Samaagamaa Festival in Chennai, KM Music Conservatory in Chennai, Ustad Rahmat Khan Sangeet Sammelan in Dharwad, Samrat Sangeet Sammelan in Goa, Yashwant Rao Chauhan Smriti Sangeet Samaroha in Maharashtra, Glimpses of Kirana Gharana Music Festival in Hyderabad, and Dadar Matunga Cultural Center and Sangit Mahabharti in Mumbai.

She has been also invited to music concerts in the US and Canada, such as Annenberg Center for the Performing Arts in Philadelphia, Philadelphia Museum of Art, Chhandayan All Night concert in New York, Cornell University, Drexel University, Massachusetts Institute of Technology in Boston, and Royal Alberta Museum in Edmonton.

== Discography ==
- Serenity - Madhuvanti, Bageshree.
