= Arshad Ali Khan =

Indian classical singer

- Born: 11 May 1984 (age 42)
- Occupation: singer of Hindustani classical music
- Notable credits: Influenced by: Abdul Karim Khan; Abdul Wahid Khan; Shakoor Khan; Mashkoor Ali Khan; Amjad Ali Khan
- Awards: Ustad Bismillah Khan Yuva Puraskar Award for the Year 2013 from Sangeet Natak Akademi, Government of India

Arshad Ali Khan (born 11 May, 1984) is an Indian classical singer belonging to the Kirana gharana (singing style).

== Early life and education ==
He descends from the family lineage of Abdul Wahid Khan and Abdul Karim Khan, the founders of Kirana Gharana. He got education in music from his maternal uncles Mashkoor Ali Khan and Mubarak Ali Khan.

At the age of 9, he was described as the biggest sensation of Sawai Gandharva Samelan, following his performance on a special invitation by Bhimsen Joshi on the occasion of his 75th birthday.

== Career ==
Khan has performed in numerous music festivals around the world, including Sawai Gandharva Bhimsen Festival in Pune Harballabh Sangeet Sammelan in Jalandhar, Saptak Music Festival, Karavalli Festival, Mangalore, Sangeet Natak Akademi's ‘Sangit Pratibha’ in Patna, Gharana Sammelan in Mumbai, Bhatkhande Sangeet Sammelan, Doverlane music festival in Kolkata, Classical Music Festival organised by Parveen Begum Smruti Music and Educational Trust in Bangalore, Legends of India Baithak in Delhi.

Arshad Ali uses the merukhand vistar or development. He is a musician teacher at ITC Sangeet Research Academy, Kolkata.

He is an empanelled artist in ICCr and his international tours have taken him to the USA, Canada, Europe, the Middle East and Singapore. He has performed at the Theatre de la Ville in Paris, the Trophen Theatre in Amsterdam, the Indo-Persian Festival of Music at Marseille, the Mawazine Festival in Morocco, Raag Mala in California, Bengal Foundation Music Conference in Bangladesh among other venues.

== Awards and recognitions ==
- Ustad Bismillah Khan Yuva Puraskar Award 2013 by Sangeet Natak Akademi, Government of India.
- Jadu Bhatta Puraskar award
- Bharatiya Sansad Best Vocalist Award
- ‘Best Young Talent of the Year’ by Rasa and Melting Pot Productions
- Sur Jyotsna National Music Awards for Best Male Vocalist by Lokmat Media, Maharashtra
- Vidya Sagar Award from the National Centre for the Performing Arts (India) in Mumbai.

== CD releases ==
Year	Album title	Label
2002	MOORCHHANA	Bengal Foundation
2005	Immortal	Bihaan
2007	Sparkling Kirana	Saregama
2011	Alaap	Orion Entertainment
