= Firoz Dastur =

Indian classical music singer (1919–2008)

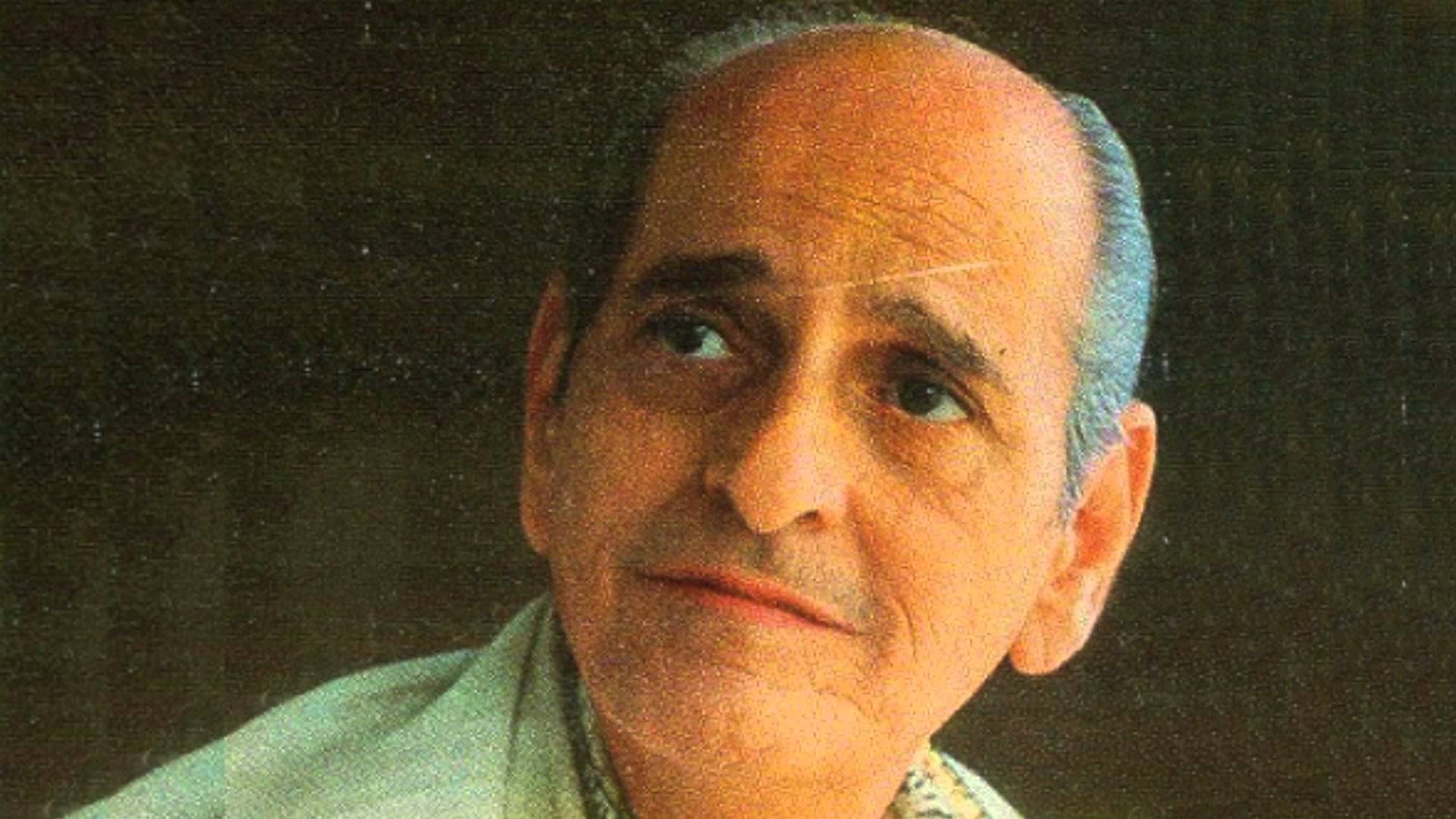
- Born: 30 September 1919; Bombay, Bombay Presidency, British India
- Died: 9 May 2008 (aged 88); Mumbai, Maharashtra, India
- Occupation: Singer • actor
- Years active: 1941 – 2006
- Known for: Indian classical music
- Awards: Sangeet Natak Akademi Award by the Government of India in 1986; Tansen Award

Firoz Dastur (also spelled Feroze Dastur) (30 September 1919 – 9 May 2008) was an Indian actor and an Indian classical vocalist from the Kirana gharana (singing style).

== Career ==
Born into a Parsi family in Bombay. Dastur worked in the Indian film industry in 1930s, acting in a few films by Wadia Movietone and others. In 1933, when Wadia Movietone under JBH Wadia, released its first talkie film, he performed classical songs as child actor in film Lal-e-Yaman. But his first love was Indian classical music.

He was a disciple of Sawai Gandharva, whose other disciples were Bhimsen Joshi and Gangubai Hangal, and a regular performer at Sawai Gandharva Music Festival for several years, well into his late 80s.

Dastur's music was very close to Abdul Karim Khan's style. He taught music to many students.

== Awards and recognition ==
- Sangeet Natak Akademi award in 1986.
- Tansen award

== Death ==
Firoz Dastur died on 9 May 2008 in Mumbai, India after a brief illness. He was 89.

== Bibliography ==
- Homi Rogers (1993). Feroz Dastur: Striking the Right Note. Trustees of the Parsi Punchayet Funds and Properties.
