= Piya Ke Milan Ki Aas =

Song

Piya Ke Milan Ki Aas is a thumri song of Hindustani classical music. It was popularized by Kirana Gharana's founder Abdul Karim Khan. It is in raga Mishra - Jogiya.
