= Nagaraja Rao Havaldar =

Nagaraja Rao Havaldar ನಾಗರಾಜ ರಾವ್ ಹವಲ್ದಾರ್
- Born: Pt. Dr. Nagaraja Rao Havaldar; 17 July 1959 (age 66)
- Origin: Hosapete, Karnataka
- Genres: Hindustani Classical Music - Exponent of Kirana, Jaipur-Atrauli Gharanas, Vachana Saahitya, Daasa Saahitya, and Devotional Music
- Occupation: Hindustani Classical Vocalist
- Years active: 1981 – present
- Website: http://www.pandithavaldar.com

Nagaraja Rao Havaldar (Kannada: ನಾಗರಾಜ ರಾವ್ ಹವಲ್ದಾರ್) (17 July 1959) is a Hindustani Classical vocalist from Karnataka, India.

== Education ==
=== Music ===
Havaldar is a disciple of Madhava Gudi, himself a prime disciple of the Kirana scion Bhimsen Joshi. He is also a disciple of Panchakshari Swami Mattigatti, a senior disciple of Mallikarjun Mansur, of the Jaipur-Atrauli Gharana.

During his study for "Sangeetha Ratna", a six-year degree course in Hindustani Classical Music from Karnataka University karnataka, Dharwad, Karnataka, he studied under Mallikarjun Mansur, the Head of the Department of Music, as well as Panchakshari Swami Mattigatti, Pandit Basavaraj Rajaguru (Kirana), Pandit Sangameshwar Gurav (Kirana) and Dr. B.D. Pathak who were faculty members.

=== Academic ===
He holds a "Sangeetha Ratna" degree in Hindustani Classical Music from Karnataka University, Dharawada. He is also a gold medalist M.A. in History and Archeology, and holds a Doctorate in Music from Karnataka University, his doctorate thesis being "The History of Classical Music in Karnataka".

== Career ==
=== Performances ===
He has performed all over India, including in venues such as the Hampi Utsava, Mysore Dassera Durbar Festival and Sankat Mochan Sangeet Samaroh at Varanasi. He has also toured the United States and the United Kingdom extensively. While his style reflects his training from Kirana masters, he is also familiar with Jaipur-Atrauli specialities such as Basanti Kedar, Basanti Kanada and Nat Malhar. He has popularized the Kannada Khayal by adapting Vachanas, literary works of Haridasas and suitable contemporary poetry in Kannada, to the traditional khayal form.

Besides live performances, Havaldar has recorded numerous albums in the Khayal and lighter genres. He is the founder and president of Sunaada Art Foundation, an organization dedicated to the promotion of Indian classical Music.

=== Composing ===
As a composer, Havaldar has scored music for various plays and television shows such as Girish Karnad’s Taledanda, P. Lankesh’s Gunamukha staged by the theatre group Roopantara, the television version of Master Hirannayya’s Lanchavatara and T N Seetharam’s teleserial, Mukhamukhi. He has also worked with a theatre group in Indianapolis on the music of a play with a spiritual theme.

=== Teaching ===
He regularly conducts lecture-demonstrations and workshops on music for companies like Wipro, Computer Associates, Birla 3M and Khodays among others, on topics such as Stress Management through Music and Appreciation of Hindustani Classical Music.

Havaldar has taught and continues to teach Hindustani music, both locally in Bengaluru, as well as internationally to students in the United States and United Kingdom via workshops and telephonic sessions. Many of his students have become prominent musicians themselves, notably his son Omkarnath Havaldar and Kannada playback singer Chaitra HG.

=== Other ===
Havaldar has previously worked as a Programme Executive at the Music Archives, All India Radio, Bengaluru (1988–1991). He was also formerly the chairman of Textbook Committee for Hindustani Music, for The Directorate of Textbooks, Karnataka.

== Personal life ==
Havaldar was born in Hosapete town in Bellary District, Karnataka, where he spent his early years until his graduation. He currently resides in Bengaluru. His sons Omkarnath and Kedarnath are upcoming musicians - Omkarnath is a vocalist while Kedarnath is a tabaliya.
