= Baldev Singh Bali =

Indian musician

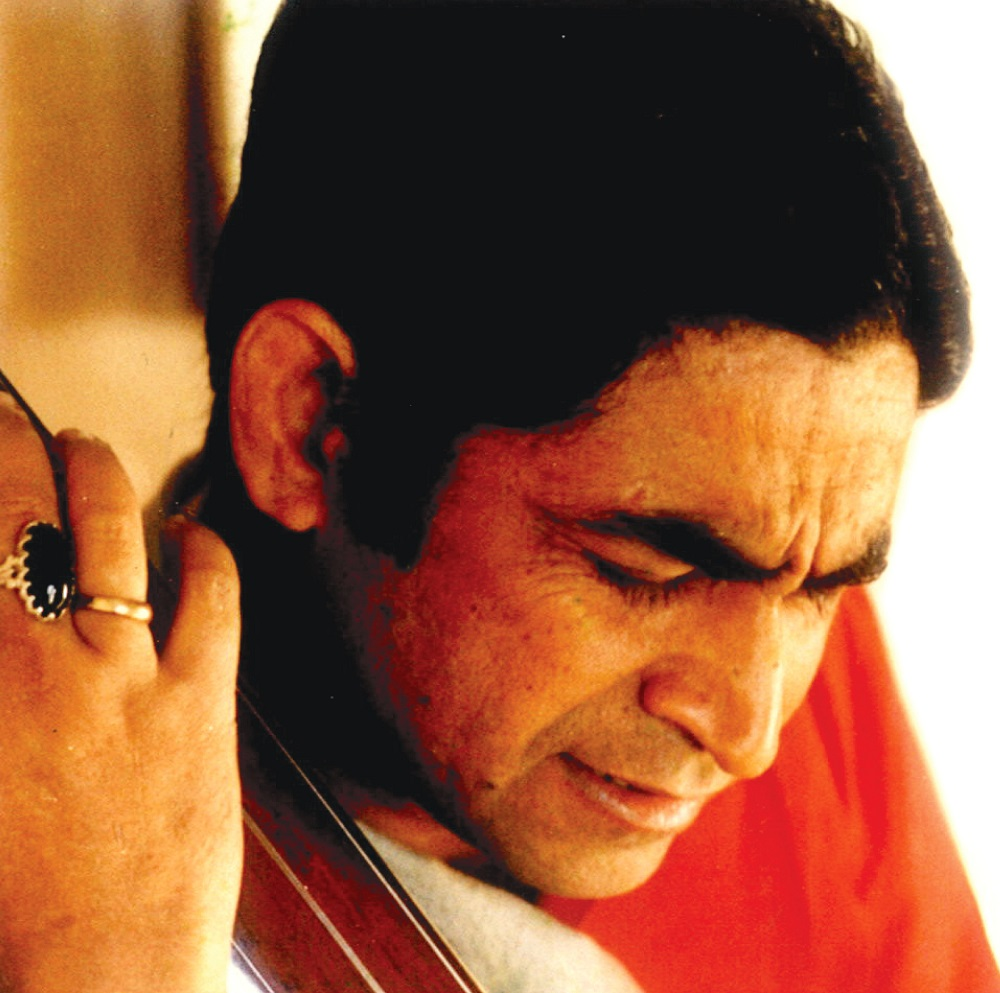
- Born: 20 September 1940; Jammu
- Occupations: Hindustani Classical Vocalist; Professor emeritus at the University of Jammu
- Years active: 1958–present
- Spouse: Smt. Veena Bali
- Children: Vasudha Dutt, Pinka Bali, Mukta Monish Mehta
- Parent(s): Surinder Singh Bali (father); Shanta Bali (mother)

Prof. Baldev Singh Bali (also known as B.S.Bali) is an Indian classical musician and Professor emeritus at the Institute of Music and Fine Arts Jammu where he also served as the Dean of the college and Head of the Music Faculty.

== Family ==
Baldev Singh Bali was born to Surinder Singh Bali and Shanta Bali. His grandfather Kartar Singh Bali has served the Dogra rulers of his time as the military secretary as well as foreign affairs aid.

== Musical training ==
His first music teacher was Ram Prashad Razdan and Pt. Dilip Chandra Vedi from whom he learned classical music for 10 years from 1957. In 1958, he learned Kirana gharana gayaki from Bhimsen Joshi when he came to Jammu for a Radio engagement. He has been a part of several music conferences and performances with Pt. Bhimsen Joshi. He was also trained in Dhrupad, Dhamar, Khayal, Thumri, Tappa, and Bhajans.

== Education ==
Baldev Singh Bali did his B.A. from the University of Jammu and Kashmir and Prabhakar (Honours in Hindi) from the University of Punjab. He completed his master's degree in music from Gandharva Mahavidyalaya Mandal in Pune, Maharashtra.

== Career ==
He joined the Institute of Music and Fine Arts Jammu as an instructor for vocal Indian classical music. In 1972 he was promoted as a Senior Instructor and later to the position of Principal in 1993. He retired in 1998 as ex-Dean of the college and Head of the Music Faculty at University of Jammu. He has been an ex-member on Advisory Panel of All India Radio and an expert member on the interview Board of the Institute of Music and Fine Arts constituted by the Jammu and Kashmir Academy of Art, Culture and Languages. He also served on the panel of experts in the subject of education at Kurukshetra University where he was one of the panel advisor to Northern Command for recruitment of music faculty.

In 1994, he was entrusted by the Shree Mata Vaishno Devi Shrine Board to produce a music cassette, which was sung by Bharat Ratna Pt. Bhimsen Joshi. The music cassette was released by His Master's Voice.

== Accolades ==
- State Award from K. V. Krishna Rao for contribution in the field of Music in 1996
- Nehru Centenary Award by Justice R. P. Sethi of Jammu and Kashmir High Court in 1989
- Silver Medal by the then Prime Minister of the J & K Sheikh Mohd. Abdullah in 1952
