= Malabika Kanan =

Musical artist (1930–2009)

Background information
- Born: 27 December 1930; Lucknow, India
- Died: 17 February 2009 (aged 78) Calcutta, India
- Genre: Indian classical music
- Occupation: Vocalist

Malabika Kanan (27 December 1930 – 17 February 2009) was an Indian classical vocalist.

== Biography ==
Kanan was born in Lucknow on 27 December 1930 to Rabindralal Roy, a musicologist and a disciple of Vishnu Narayan Bhatkhande. In her early years she trained in the musical genres of dhrupad, dhamar and khyal for a number of years under her father. She also got training in Rabindrasangeet from Santidev Ghosh and Suchitra Mitra. She traveled with her father on musical concerts in many places within the country. Her first music rendering was in raga Ramkali on the All India Radio when she was 15 years old. Her first performance on stage followed the next year at the Tansen Sangeet Samaroh.

Kanan married A. Kanan, another singer, on 28 February 1958, and developed a new style of singing by adopting his Kirana style. She was also trained by him in thumri. She was very proficient in singing bhajans. She performed in several concerts and in many Radio Sangeet Sammelans. At the ITC Sangeet Research Academy, where her husband was a guru, she also became a teacher in July 1979, and was a member of the expert committee of the academy. She died in Calcutta on 17 February 2009.

== Awards ==
Kanan received the ITC Sangeet Research Academy Award in 1995 and the Sangeet Natak Akademi Award in 1999–2000.
