= Sangmeshwar Gurav =

Indian Classical Singer

Sangameshwar Gurav
- Born: Sangameshwar Gurav
- Died: 7 May 2014
- Genre: Hindustani classical music
- Occupation: singer

Sangameshwar Gurav was a singer associated with the Kirana Gharana movement. He was taught musical skills by Ganpatrao Gurav.

== Career ==
Gurav was born in Jamkhandi where his father, Ganpatrao Gurav, was a court musician. Ganpatrao was a direct descendant of Abdul Karim Khan. He was raised by father in Dharwad. He was a teacher in the music department of Karnatak University where he worked alongside Mallikarjun Mansur, Basavraj Rajguru, and Gangubai Hangal.

== Awards ==
Gurav received the Central Sangeet Natak Akademi award for Hindustani vocal music in 2001.

== Death and descendants ==
Gurav died on 7 May 2014 at the age of 86. He is survived by wife, two sons, and two daughters. His son Kaivalya Kumar Gurav continues the musical lineage. His other son Nandikeshwar is a tabla artist employed at Karnatak University.

== See also ==
- Kirana gharana
- Bhimsen Joshi
