= Amjad Ali Khan (Indian vocalist) =

Indian classical vocalist

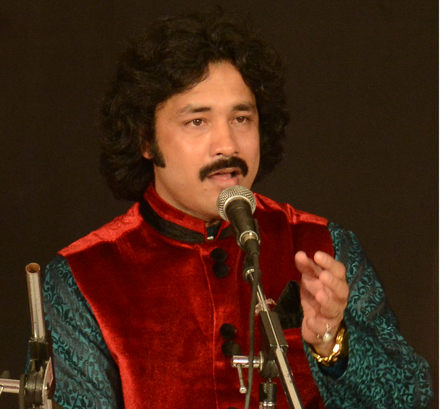

Background information
- Born: 4 September 1980 (age 46)
- Genre: Hindustani classical
- Occupation: singer
- Website: amjadalikhan.in

Amjad Ali Khan is an Indian classical singer and teacher of Kirana Gharana.

He has performed all over the world and is the founder of Kirana Gharana Music Academy that teaches students classical music.

== Early life and education ==
Amjad descends from the family lineage of Abdul Wahid Khan and Abdul Karim Khan, who were the founders of the Kirana Gharana. As the elder son of the vocalist Akhtar Nawaz Khan, he got education in music from his father and his maternal uncles Mashkoor Ali Khan and Mubarak Ali Khan.

== Career ==
Khan has performed in many prestigious music festivals and concerts; such as Sawai Gandharva Bhimsen Festival, Pune in 2015, Harballabh Sangeet Sammelan in Jallandhar, Tihai Music Festival in Goa, Samrath Music Festival in Goa, Kalashree Mahotsav in Pune, Mangubai Music Festival in Goa, Delhi Youth Festival conducted by Ministry of Culture in Delhi, ARPAN and SHOPAN MAHOTSAV in DELHI, Yuva Pratibhotsav in Goa, "Khayal – the Colours of Indian Classical Vocal" organized in Lok Kala Manch, Delhi, Ganga Utsav in Varanasi, Nritya and Sangeet Sammelan organized by Pracheen Kala Kendra, Chandigarh, Shastriya, Nritya Vadya Yantra & Sangeet, IITF – Delhi, "Tribute to Ustad Munawar Ali Khan" organized by Sargam music society in IIT Delhi, etc.

He has conducted workshops for the propagation of Indian music for many organizations such as Sahitya Kala Parishad, SPIC MACAY, Shree Ram Center, Routes 2 Roots.

He is an empanelled artist in ICCR and has performed in China, Switzerland, Germany, Europe, Australia, etc.

He is the founder of Kirana Gharana Music Academy, a formal music school established with the vision of propagating Hindustani classical music and the gharana gayaki in a structured way. He aims to train the deserving talent irrespective of their social and economic class; he imparts free education to the under privileged children.

== Awards and recognitions ==
He received the Bharat Ratna Pt. Bhimsen Joshi National Award in 2015. He is also the recipient of Rotary Club's Vocational Award for excellence in the field of music (2016), Surmani Award by 43rd Kal Ke Kalakar Sangeet Sammelan Mumbai (2004), Hari Vallabh Music Award (2003) and Suron ke Silsile Award (1999).

He received a scholarship from the Sahitya Kala Parishad and the Young and Talented Artist scholarship from Government of India, Department of Culture.

His performance in a concert ‘A Tribute to Pt Deena Nath Mangeshkar’ organised by Prachin Kala Kendra Nritya is still remembered by many.
