= Hirabai Barodekar =

Indian singer (1905–1989)

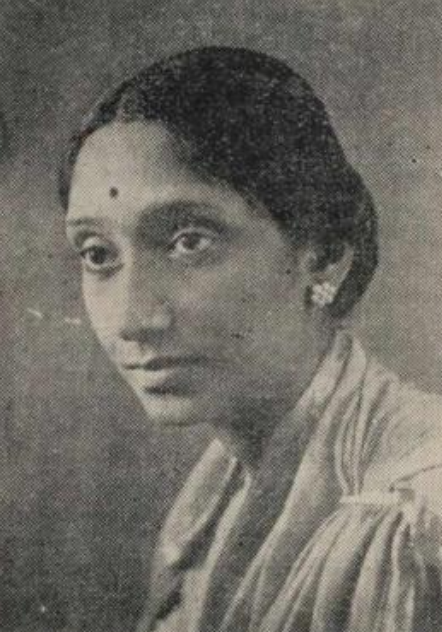
- Hirabai Barodekar, from a 1937 issue of The Indian Listener

Background information
- Born: Champākali; 29 May 1905; Miraj, Bombay Presidency, British India
- Died: 20 November 1989 (aged 84)
- Genres: Khyal, Thumri, Ghazal, and Bhajan
- Occupation: Vocal Hindustani Classical Music
- Years active: 1920–1980

Hirābai Barodekar (1905–1989) was an Indian Hindustāni classical music singer, of Kirana gharana. She was a disciple of Ustād Abdul Wahid Khān.

== Early life and background ==
Hirabai was born as Champākali to Kirānā Gharānā master Ustād Abdul Karim Khān and Tārābāi Māne. Tarabai was the daughter of Sardār Māruti Rāo Māne, a brother of princely Barodā state's Rajmātā during the middle of the 19th century. Abdul Karim Khan was the court musician in Baroda when Tarabai was young, and he taught her music. The two fell in love and decided to get married; but Tarabai's parents disapproved of the alliance, and the couple had to leave the state (along with Abdul Karim's brother, Ustād Abdul Haq Khān). The couple moved to Bombay (now Mumbai), and had two sons: Suresh or Abdul Rehmān, and Krishnā; and three daughters: Champākali, Gulāb, and Sakinā or Chhotutāi. In their adult lives, the five respectively became known as Sureshbābu Māne, Krishnarāo Māne, Hirābāi Badodekar (called Champu-tai by close friends), Kamalābāi Badodekar, and Sarswatibāi Rāne.

She had her initial training from her brother Sureshbabu Mane and later training from the doyen of Kirana Gharana, Ustād Abdul Wahid Khān, who was a cousin of her father. (In 1922, Hirabai's parents had parted company; thus Hirabai received only limited musical lessons from her father.)

She often performed along with her younger sister, Saraswati Rane.

== Singing career ==
Hirabai appeared in her first public performance under patronage of Kesarbai Kerkar at the age of 15.

She was an expert in Khyāl, Thumri, Marāthi Nātya Sangeet, and Bhajan. She is credited with having popularised Hindustāni Classical Music among the masses. She was a pioneer of concerts by women artists in India. She was the first female artist to introduce ticketed concerts in India. Her rendition of 'Taar Sa' was very popular and became her hallmark. She made Kirana gharana more popular and rich.

Hirabai acted in several movies, including "Suvarna Mandir", "Pratibhā", "Janābāi", and "Municipality". She also started a music school, "Nutan Sangeet Vidyālaya", to teach music to girls. The school staged several plays.

Hirabai became a recording artist very early in her career. (Her 78 rpm recordings have been re-released on cassettes by RPG in their Classical Gold series). She was titled as "Gaanhira" (a singing diamond).

== Honours ==
Hirabai's work in Hindustani music fetched her many prestigious accolades. She was awarded with the Sangeet Nātak Akādemi Award in 1965 and the Padma Bhushan Award in 1970. She was also awarded Vishnudas Bhave Award for her contribution to theater.

She was chosen to sing the national song, Vande Mataram, from the Red Fort in India's capital Delhi on the day India received its independence from the British Raj (15 August 1947). She visited China and the East African countries as a part of an Indian delegation in 1953.

She was titled "Gaan kokila" (Nightingale of India) by Sarojini Naidu. An annual music festival is held in Mumbai by her disciple Prabha Atre by the name Sureshbabu – Hirabai Smruti Sangeet Samaroh since 1992, which has become one of the major festivals of music in the country.

== Family ==
She was married to Manikrao Gandhi-Barodekar. Her grandson Nishikant Barodekar is a tabla player, a student of Zakir Hussain.

== Disciples ==
Her prominent disciples includes: Saraswati Rane, Manik Varma, Dr Prabha Atre, Malati Pande, Janaki Iyer, Shaila Pandit, Sulabha Thakar etc There were many women vocalists who were deeply influenced by Hirabai’s singing style and presentation skills.
