= Amjad Khan =

Amjad Khan may refer to:

- Amjad Khan (actor) (1940–1992), Indian actor and director
- Amjad Khan (boxer) (born 1994), Indian boxer and trainer
- Amjad Khan (American cricketer) (born 1966), Indian-born American cricketer
- Amjad Khan (Emirati cricketer) (born 1989), Emirati cricketer
- Amjad Khan (English cricketer) (born 1980), Danish-born English cricketer
- Amjad Khan (squash player) (born 1978), Pakistani squash player
- Amjad Ali Khan (born 1945), Indian classical musician
- Amjad Ali Khan (Indian vocalist) (born 1980), Indian classical vocalist
- Amjad Ali Khan (politician) (born 1972), Pakistani politician
- Amjad Farooq Khan (born 1950), Pakistani politician
- Amjad Mohammed Khan, Pakistani anaesthesiologist, ex-husband of Aafia Siddiqui
- Amjad Khan, fictional character portrayed by Amjad Khan in the 1980 Indian film Qurbani
- Amjad Khan, fictional character portrayed by Akshay Kumar in the 2005 Indian film Insan
