= Pran Nath (musician) =

Indian singer

Pran Nath (पंडित प्राणनाथ)
- Pandit Pran Nath

Background information
- Born: 3 November 1918; Lahore, British India
- Died: 13 June 1996 (aged 77) Berkeley, California, US
- Genres: North Indian classical, dhrupad, khayal
- Occupation: Singer

Pandit Pran Nath (Devanagari: पंडित प्राणनाथ) (3 November 1918 – 13 June 1996) was an Indian classical singer and master of the Kirana gharana singing style. Promoting traditional raga principles, Nath exerted an influence on notable American minimalist and jazz musicians, including La Monte Young, Terry Riley, and Don Cherry. He began performing in the United States in the 1970s, and established the Kirana Center for Indian Classical Music in 1972; he subsequently taught in various universities across the US and Europe.

== Early life ==
Pran Nath was born into a wealthy family in Lahore in present-day Pakistan. While they were avid devotees of music, inviting musicians into the house to perform nightly, his mother did not approve of his desire to become a musician, so he left home at the age of 13 and took up residence with the reclusive singer Abdul Wahid Khan of the Kirana gharana, cousin of the more widely known Abdul Karim Khan.

Pran Nath stayed with Khan for nearly two decades. Both guru and disciple were much attracted to mysticism: Abdul Wahid Khan, a Muslim, to Sufism; and Nath, a Hindu, to a Shaivite sect in Dehra Dun. It is said that Nath lived in a cave near the Tapkeswhar temple to Shiva for five years, serving his guru intermittently. He eventually married and reentered the world at the request (guru dakshana) of his guru, in order to ensure the preservation of the Kirana style. In 1937, he became a staff artist with All India Radio.

However, Nath stuck to Abdul Wahid Khan's extra-methodical and austere singing style, with a heavy emphasis on alap and slow tempo, which suited his voice well but was not very popular. Like his teacher, Pran Nath's singing emphasized precise intonation and the gradual, note-by-note exposition of tone and mood in the alap section of the music.

Nath supported himself as a music teacher, and worked at the University of Delhi from 1960 to 1970.

== Life in the United States ==
1978 Poster by Marian Zazeela for Pandit Pran Nath, Evening Ragas Dia Art Foundation

In 1970, Pran Nath travelled to New York to visit the American composer La Monte Young and visual artist Marian Zazeela, who heard his first issued recording, Earth Groove: The Voice of Cosmic India (1968). In 1972, he established the Kirana Center for Indian Classical Music in New York City and lived in the US for the rest of his life. He was a visiting professor of music at Mills College, teaching one semester a year from 1973 to 1984.

In 1985, he moved to the San Francisco area, and he continued to teach privately in the United States, Canada, Europe, and India. His album Ragas of Morning and Night was released by Gramavision Records in 1986 and he appeared with the Kronos Quartet on their album Short Stories, released by Nonesuch Records in 1993.

== Death ==
Pandit Pran Nath died of congestive heart failure and complications of Parkinson's disease at Alta Bates Summit Medical Center in Berkeley on 13 June, 1996. He was survived by his wife, Rani Budhiraja Nath; by a son, Bhuwanneshwar; three daughters, Shashi Maini, Kiran Arora and Uma Maini; and by seven grandchildren.

== Influence ==
Pran Nath attracted a strong following among the American minimalist composers, including La Monte Young, Terry Riley, Marian Zazeela, Rhys Chatham, Jon Hassell, Catherine Christer Hennix, Charlemagne Palestine, Shabda Kahn, Jon Gibson, George Brooks, Michael Harrison, Yoshi Wada, Henry Flynt, and many others. Jazz musicians such as Don Cherry and Lee Konitz also drew influence from his teaching. Artists such as Simone Forti and David Weinrib were also students of Pran Nath.

== Discography ==
- Earth Groove (1968), Ragas Bhupali and Asavari
- India's Master Vocalist (1972), Ragas Yaman Kalyan and Punjabi Berva
- Ragas of Morning and Night (1986), Ragas Miya ki Todi and Darbari Kanada, two ragas for which Pran Nath was particularly noted
- Midnight (2003), Raga Malkauns, two separate recordings made in 1971 and 1976
- The Raga Cycle (2006), Ragas Shudh Sarang and Kut Todi, recorded in 1972

== Unreleased recordings ==
Like his teacher Abdul Wahid Khan, Pran Nath did not emphasize recording or the releasing of records, preferring live performance. While only three recordings of Pran Nath were released during his lifetime, a large number of recordings exist under the care of La Monte Young. In Pran Nath's will, Young, as executor of his estate, was instructed to begin releasing recordings.

== Films ==
- 1986 – In Between the Notes: A Portrait of Pandit Pran Nath. Produced by Other Minds. Directed by William Farley.
- 1995 – Musical Outsiders: An American Legacy - Harry Partch, Lou Harrison, and Terry Riley. Directed by Michael Blackwood.
