= Milind Chittal =

Indian singer

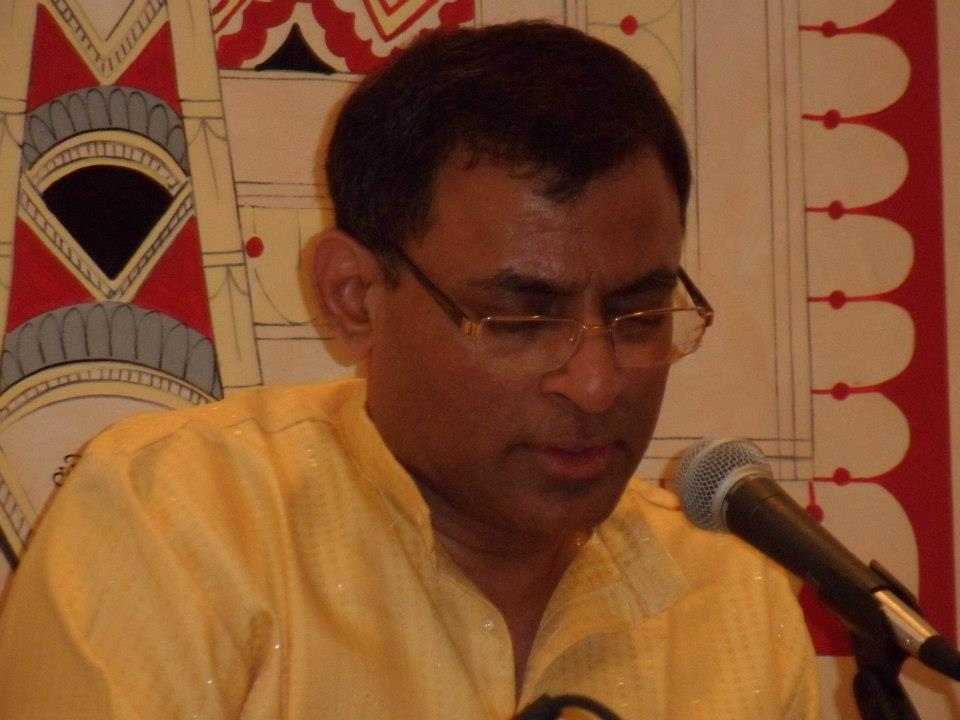

Background information
- Born: Milind Chittal; 19 July 1959 (age 67); Karwar, Karnataka, India
- Origin: Mumbai, Maharashtra, India
- Genre: Hindustani classical music
- Occupations: Singer, chartered accountant
- Website: milindchittal.com

Milind Chittal is an Indian classical vocalist. Chittal is the son of Kannada writer Yashwant Chittal. He trained under Firoz Dastur of the Kirana Gharana. He is a 'Top' grade artist for classical music on All India Radio. He is also a qualified Chartered Accountant and lived and worked in Dubai for a significant number of years while continuing to perform and teach music .

== Career ==
Chittal's devotional album Enchanting Ram Bhajans was nominated for GiMA awards' for the best devotional album in 2015. He has performed at major music festivals all over India and has also performed abroad in USA, Canada, UK, New Zealand, Australia, UAE and Oman. He has given playback for the television serial The Discovery of India produced by Shyam Benegal. He was featured in Surabhi in the year 1998 and the Umang television series in 2011. Chittal was a member of the Jury for the 3iii International Indian Icon contest. He participated in the biggest Hanuman Janmotsav in 2024 where musicians from all over the world chanted for world peace.

=== Discography ===
Milind has recorded music albums for several music companies like Times Music, Magnasound, Mystica Music and Fountain Music.

Following is a list of some of his albums:

Classical :

- ‘Aesthetic Melodies’ – Classical Music album of various ragas
- ‘Alaap’ – Classical Music album of various ragas
- ‘Bandishein’ – Short compositions in various ragas performed live in concerts
- ‘Evening Reflections’ – Classical Music album of various evening ragas
- ‘Exuberance’-Ragas Marwa, Kalavati and Jogia by Mystica Music Co.
- ‘Khayal’ – Classical Music album of various ragas performed live in concerts
- ‘Morning & Afternoon Ragas’ – Classical Music album of various ragas
- ‘Raag Rang’ – Classical Music album of short compositions in various ragas
- 'Raga Mala'- Classical Music album of various ragas
- ‘Classical Music albums by Fountain Music Company:
1. Ragas Ahir Bhairav and Hindol
2. Ragas Darbari Kanada and Jog
3. Ragas Malkauns, Abhogi Kanada and Shankara
4. Ragas Puriya Kalyan and Miyan Ki Malhar
5. Ragas Yaman Kalyan, Basant and Gujari Todi

Devotional:

- 'Abhang’ – Marathi devotional songs
- 'Embracing Krishna’ –Krishna Bhajans CD by Mystica Music Co.
- 'Enchanting Ram bhajans’ –Ram Bhajans CD by Mystica Music Co.
- 'Simply Divine Bhajans’ – Hindi Bhajans CD

Theme based:

- 'Payaliya Jhankar’ – Classical ragas based on theme ‘Payaliya Jhankar’
- 'Tarana’ – Compilation of 12 taranas in various ragas
- ‘Thumris of Kirana Gharana’ by Times Music
- 'Malhar Rang’ – Classical Music album of Monsoon ragas

=== Awards and prizes ===
Milind Chittal was nominated for Best Devotional Album at the 2015 Global Indian Film Awards
