= Mashkoor Ali Khan =

Indian singer

- Born: 27 February 1957
- Genre: Hindustani classical
- Occupation: singer
- Website: mashkooralikhan.com

Ustad Mashkoor Ali Khan is an Indian classical singer and teacher from the Kirana musical style. As the grandson of Abdul Karim Khan, a founder of the Kirana style, he is a descendant of the gharana's family lineage. He was educated by his father, sarangi player Shakoor Khan.

Mashkoor Ali Khan performs as an A-grade artist with All India Radio, and is on the faculty of the ITC Sangeet Research Academy, a prominent institution of Indian Classical Music, as their senior teacher of the Kirana style.

== Contributions to musicology ==
As a scholar, Khan is also known for his work preserving traditional musical compositions and has collected one of the largest archives of unique bandishes (musical compositions) in the world, partially inherited as the grandson of Abdul Karim Khan and grandnephew of Abdul Wahid Khan – the founders of the Kirana gharana.

== Students ==
Notable students include his nephews Amjad Ali Khan and Arshad Ali Khan, Sandip Bhattacharjee, the late Shanti Sharma, and the American composer/pianist Michael Harrison who he has also performed with. He is also currently training his daughter Shahana Ali Khan.

== Awards ==
Recipient of the prestigious Sangeet Natak Akademi Award for 2015, Mashkoor Ali Khan has received many other awards as well, including the Abhinav Kala Sammelan (1993), the Master Dinanath Mangeshkar (1994), the Swaranjali (1997), the Best Vocalist Award by the Bharatiya Sanskriti Samsad (1990) and the Ustad Niaz Ahmed Khan and Faiyyaz Ahmed Khan Memorial Award (2004), and Hindusthan Art & Music Society's Gandharva award (2012). The Salt Lake Cultural Association of Kolkata gave him the title of Bandish Nawaz in 1998, and Sangeet Ratna in 2002.
