= Susanne Abbuehl =

Swiss-Dutch jazz singer and composer (born 1970)

- Born: July 30, 1970 (age 56); Bern, Switzerland
- Genres: Jazz, vocal jazz
- Occupation: Singer
- Years active: 2000–present
- Label: ECM
- Website: susanneabbuehl.com

Susanne Abbuehl (born July 30, 1970) is a Swiss/Dutch jazz singer and composer.

Abbuehl heard jazz and classical music at an early age, because her parents were music fans and often took her to attend concerts. As a child she received lessons in harpsichord, playing baroque music. She began piano lessons at the age of 17 when she moved to Los Angeles. In high school she was part of an ensemble that toured the U.S. and Canada. She studied at the Royal Conservatory of The Hague, Netherlands with Jeanne Lee and Rachel Gould and earned a master's degree in performance and pedagogy. She became a student of Indian classical singer Prabha Atre in Mumbai. Abbuehl studied composition with Dutch composer Diderik Wagenaar. In her early period, Abbuehl has worked with pianist Wolfert Brederode, drummer Samuel Rohrer and clarinettist Christof May, later with flugelhornist Matthieu Michel and percussionist Olavi Louhivuori. She has cited as influences Cassandra Wilson, Shirley Horn, and Helen Merrill.

Her album April (ECM, 2001) includes vocals to poems by E.E. Cummings. The album won an Edison award, the Dutch version of the Grammy. For her album The Gift she composed music to accompany the words of Emily Bronte, Emily Dickinson, Sara Teasdale, and Wallace Stevens.

She tours with her band and other jazz musicians in Europe, North America, and Africa, playing in Montreal, Maputo, Cape Town, Rome, Paris, Zurich, Oslo, and other European cities.

In May 2006, her album Compass was released by ECM (with Michel Portal). In 2013, her radio play Der Gaukler Tag was nominated for the Prix Marulic. In her work, influences of classical music can be found. Her artistic identity is characterized by minimal instrumentation and arrangements and can be described as chamber jazz.

Abbuehl is a professor of jazz voice and ensemble at Lucerne University of Applied Sciences and Arts, as well as at the HEMU Lausanne. After being the head of the jazz department of her alma mater, the Royal Conservatory, from 2020 to 2022, she became head of the jazz departement at Hochschule für Musik Basel. She has taught masterclasses throughout Europe.

== Discography ==
- I Am Rose (Evoke, 1997)
- April (ECM, 2001)
- Ida Lupino (Radio Nederland, 2002)
- Compass (ECM, 2006)
- The Gift (ECM, 2013)
- Princess (Vision Fugitive, 2017), with Stéphan Oliva and Øyvind Hegg-Lunde
