= Pandit Bhimsen Joshi Lifetime Achievement Award =

Civil award of Maharashtra

Pandit Bhimsen Joshi Lifetime Achievement Award (Marathi: पंडित भीमसेन जोशी जीवनगौरव पुरस्कार) by the Government of Maharashtra since 2012. Award is given to artist who has been doing outstanding work in the field of classical singing and playing for a long time. The honour conveys the money prize of ₹0.1 million (US$1,200), a citation and a memento.

== Recipients ==
The recipients of the Pandit Bhimsen Joshi Lifetime Achievement Award are as follows

| # | Year | Name | Ref. |
|---|---|---|---|
| 1 | 2012 | Kishori Amonkar | |
| 2 | 2013 | Jasraj | |
| 3 | 2014 | Prabha Atre | |
| 4 | 2015 | Ram Narayan | |
| 5 | 2016 | Parveen Sultana | |
| 6 | 2017 | Manik Bhide | |
| 7 | 2018 | Keshav Ginde | |
| 8 | 2019 | Arvind Parikh | |
| 9 | 2020 | N. Rajam | |
| 10 | 2021 | Shivkumar Sharma | |
