= Madhav Gudi =

Indian classical singer

Background information
- Born: 23 December 1941; Dharwad, Karnataka
- Died: 22 April 2011 (aged 69) Dharwad, Karnataka
- Genres: Hindustani Classical Music - Khayal & light forms
- Occupation: Hindustani Classical Vocalist

Pandit Madhav Gudi (23 December 1941 – 22 April 2011) was a Hindustani classical vocalist, who specialised in Khayal and renditions of devotional music, particularly of Dasavani.

== Early life and background ==
Gudi was born in 1941 at Jalihal, Dharwad, Karnataka to Subhadra and Gururajachar Gudi, a family of Keertankars and Harikatha (devotional) musicians. His grandfather, Seshachar, was a Carnatic music vocalist and his father was a well-known Keertankar in Dharwad. Gudi was introduced to music at a very early age. Young Madhav would often accompany his father to his Keertana programs which had a great influence on him and paved the way towards his musical career.

== Musical training ==
His rich and sonorous voice encouraged his father to introduce him to musical training under the tutelage of Pandit Nageshrao Deshpande, the great maestro from whom Gudi received his formal initiation into Hindustani classical music.

Gudi was about 12 years old when he first heard Bhimsen Joshi at the first edition of the Sawai Gandharva Music Festival. Later when Bhimsen Joshi had come to visit Jalihal Srinivasachar, a renowned senior spiritual teacher, young Madhav was introduced to Bhimsen Joshi by Srinivasachar and advised Joshi to listen to Gudi's music. Madhav Gudi demonstrated his musical talent by singing Bhimsen Joshi's songs from Kannada plays like Bhagya Nidhi and Parivartana. At the advice of Pandit Jalihal Srinivasachar and Pandit Keshavacharya Jalihal, Joshi agreed to take Madhav Gudi under his guidance and bestowed upon him the glorious tradition of his music. Thus began a new chapter in Pandit Gudi's life. In a true Guru-Shishya milieu which lasted well over twenty-five years, Pandit Madhav Gudi, the musician and performer was sculpted. Gudi mostly lived in Pune as part of Joshi's family for 26 years. That made him Joshi's most trusted disciple, and the richest source of knowledge about the life & times of one of the greatest musicians of this century. For a year and a half, Joshi didn't teach Gudi much. Once Joshi was convinced that Gudi was a deserving student, he started imparting his training to Gudi. For five years Joshi taught him only three ragas. Todi in the morning, Multani in the afternoon, and Puriya at night.

== Personal life ==
Gudi was married to Ramabai at the age of 30 years. They had four children - Anupama, Prasanna, Bhargavi and Gayathri.

== Career ==
Gudi's voice was suited for Hindustani classical as well as light classical (Dasavani and Abhang) music. A top-grade All India Radio artiste, he toured all over India and performed with Pandit Bhimsen Joshi at several programs in India and overseas. Known for his melodious yet powerful voice, Madhav Gudi possessed a collection of many different styles of compositions in many different languages. He specialized in Khataka, Murki, variety of Taans, Aakaara (Alaap), Ukaara & Makaara.

Gudi has also trained many musicians in Hindustani Classical and devotional music. His students include his daughters - Anupama Mangalvede, Gayatri & Bhargavi, son Prasanna Gudi, brothers - Raghavendra Gudi & Sheshagiri Gudi, Bhimsen Mannur, Dr. Nagaraj Rao Havaldar, Omkarnath Havaldar, Uday Nayak, Sanjiv Chimmalgi, Sanjiv Jahagirdar, Upendra Bhat, Shrinivas Sawai, Shrivallabh Mulgund, Sham Alur, Ramesh Kulkarni, Anuradha Bhadri, Dilip Joshi, Sangeeta Katti, grandson Shriniketan, Uday Nayak, Nilam Sharma, Radha Bhat, Radha Mehta, Nandan Jodi, Nachiket Sharma, among others.

Gudi was also the composer of the devotional songs 'Sriniketana' and 'Bhagyada Lakshmi Baramma' which were popularised by Bhimsen Joshi.

== Awards ==
Among several accolades that he received were the Sangeeta Nritya Academy award from the Government of Karnataka, Surashri, Gaana Bhaskar, Smt Vatsala Tai Joshi Award by the hands of Legendary Dr. Prabha Atre, Gaana Kala Tilaka and the Yashavant Rao Chauhan Samata Gaurav Puraskar.
