= Kaivalya Kumar Gurav =

Pandit Kaivalya Kumar
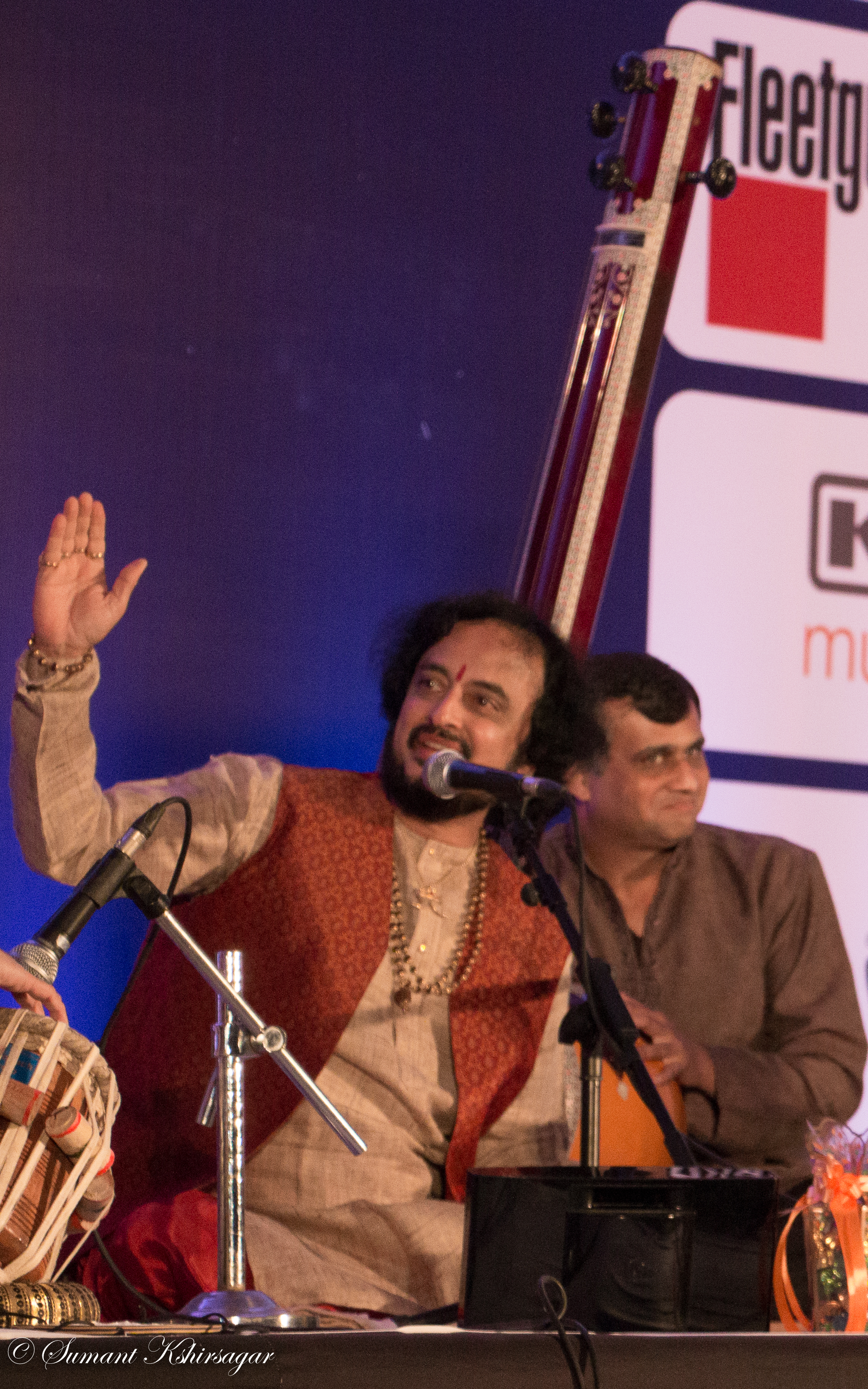

Background information
- Born: Kaivalya Kumar Gurav; 22 Oct; Belgaum
- Origin: Belgaum
- Genres: Hindustani classical music
- Occupation: singer

Pandit Kaivalya Kumar Gurav is a third generation singer from the Kirana Gharana (singing style) of Indian classical music.

== Early life ==
Gurav belongs to a family of musicians. His grandfather Pt. Ganapatrao Gurav and father Sangameshwar Gurav (1927/28-2014) also belonged to Kirana Gharana. Ganpatrao Gurav was a disciple of Bhaskar Buva Bhakle, the first in line from Ustad Abdul Karim Khan who was the founder of the Kirana Gharana. Training under his grandfather, Kaivalyanand was known for singing in true Kirana Gharana tradition. His father groomed the young Gurav in vocal skills who then started his musical career with Marathi Natyasangeet and then entered to Khayal singing.

== Career ==
Kaivalya has several albums to his credit. He is the youngest Hindustani Classical vocalist to get a top grade by All India Radio and Doordarshan Gurav has performed in the United States, the United Kingdom, France, Canada, Singapore, Australia, Dubai, Muscat, and Qatar.
