= Sawai Gandharva =

Indian Hindustani classical vocalist

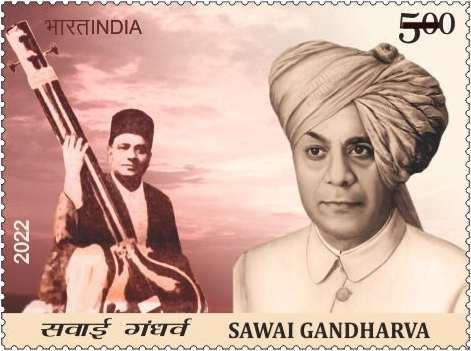
- Sawai Gandharva on a 2022 stamp of India

Background information
- Born: Ramchandra Kundgolkar Saunshi; 19 January 1886
- Origin: Kundgol, Karnataka
- Died: 12 September 1952 (aged 66)
- Genres: Hindustani Classical Music, Khayal, Thumri, Bhajan, Natyageet, etc.
- Occupation: Hindustani Classical Vocalist

Ramachandra Kundgolkar Saunshi, popularly known as Sawai Gandharva and Ram-bhau (19 January 1886 – 12 September 1952), was a popular Hindustani Classical vocalist from Karnataka. He was a master in the genre of Kirana Gharana style. He was one of the foremost disciples of Ustad Abdul Karim Khan, and was the guru of Bharat Ratna laureate Pandit Bhimsen Joshi.

Sawai Gandharva is best known for popularizing the stylings of the Kirana Gharana through his accomplished disciples, including Pt. Bhimsen Joshi, Dr. Gangubai Hangal, Firoz Dastur, and Basavaraj Rajguru.

== Early life and background ==
Ramchandra Kundgolkar was born into a Deshastha Brahmin family on 19 January 1886, in Kundgol, 19 km from Dharwad, present-day Karnataka, he grew to be known as Rambhau. His father, Ganesh Saunshi, was a local clerk employed by Ranganagowda Nadiger, a landlord. Early on, Rambhau did not show interest in academics but progressed in school through the admiration his teachers had for how "sweetly" he sang poems. Later, he was admitted to Lamington High School in Hubli which he would travel to everyday by train. Rambhau's father found it increasingly difficult to fund his son's education and eventually his schooling stopped.

== Initiation into music ==
After discontinuing his education, Rambhau's father put him under the tutelage of Balwantrao Kolhatkar who found himself in Kundgol. From Kolhatkar, Rambhau learned 75 Dhrupad compositions, 25 Tarana compositions, a hundred other compositions and also mastered a few Taals. Kolhatkar died in 1898, leaving Rambhau's tutelage incomplete and without guidance.

== Ustad Abdul Karim Khan ==
In traveling to high school everyday to Hubli, Sawai Gandharva would actively participate in the daily cultural events in Hubli, where he spent his time watching Nataks and listening to music. Once, he found himself listening to a young Ud. Abdul Karim Khan and was immediately captivated. From then onwards, Rambhau wished for the Ustad's tutelage. After Balwantrao Kolhatkar's passing, Ud. Abdul Karim Khan began touring Karnataka, where he often stayed with the Nadiger family, Rambhau's father's employer, whom Pt. Gandharva was staying with.

It was a time when Ustad Abdul Karim Khan, the founder of Kirana Gharana, was touring Karnataka. He would often stay with the Nadigers for days on end. On such a trip, Ramchandra hovered around Abdul Karim Khan, humming jamunaa ke teer, the Ustad's Bhairavi cheez. It caught Abdul Karim Khan's ear who asked, "Kaun hai yeh ladkaa? Galaa achchaa hai". Ranganagowda Nadiger pounced upon this opportunity: "Ustadji, he is our clerk's son. He wants to learn music from you". "Yeh baath hai tho chalo hamaare saath". Fortune smiled on Ramchandra. This was in 1901. Abdul Karim Khan did not want his name to be spoilt by disciples learning haphazardly. He made a contract with them that they would learn from him for at least 8 years.

== Career ==
Against the wishes of his teacher, he joined a drama company and became popular as a singer in Marathi theatre. He received acclaim for playing female roles, and also the title, Sawai Gandharva after, Bal Gandharva, the doyen of Marathi theatre. He worked for Govindrao Tembe's Shivraj Natak Mandali for some time, becoming famous for playing female roles.

In 1942, at the age of 56, his concert career ended abruptly following a paralytic stroke, but he continued teaching until he died in 1952.

== Disciples ==
Although he became a well known classical vocalist, his most enduring legacy is that he trained vocalists such as Gangubai Hangal, Bhimsen Joshi, Basavaraj Rajguru and Firoz Dastur. Krishnarao Phulambrikar started his career as child singer-actor in Natyakala Prawartak music drama company where he got an opportunity to learn classical music intended for musical theatre from Sawai Gandharva.

== Sawai Gandharva Festival ==
His disciple Bhimsen Joshi started the annual Sawai Gandharva Music Festival in Pune, in memory of Sawai Gandharva. The festival was held on a modest scale for first two decades, but it became popular in the 1970s and 1980s.
