= Prabha Atre =

Indian classical vocalist (1932–2024)

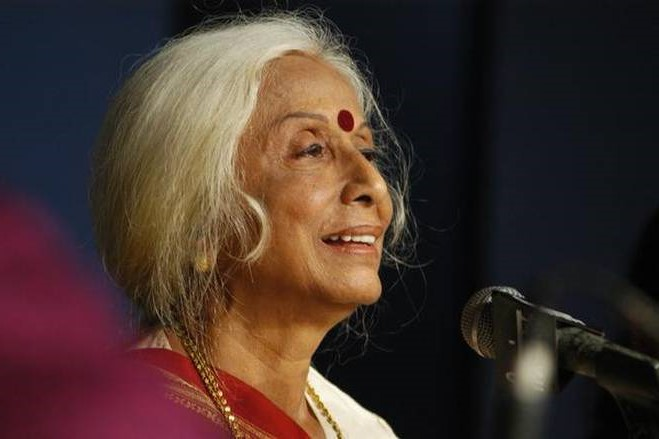
- Born: 13 September 1932; Pune, Bombay Presidency, British India (present-day Maharashtra, India)
- Died: 13 January 2024 (aged 91); Pune, Maharashtra, India
- Education: University of Pune (B.Sc; LLB); Gandharva Mahavidyalaya Music School (PhD)
- Awards: Sangeet Natak Akademi Award (1991)
- Honours: Padma Shri (1990); Padma Bhushan (2002); Padma Vibhushan (2022)
- Website: www.prabhaatre.com

Prabha Atre (13 September 1932 – 13 January 2024) was an Indian classical vocalist from the Kirana gharana. She was awarded all three of the Padma Awards by the Government of India. She died in Pune from cardiac arrest on 13 January 2024, at the age of 91 .

== Early life and education ==
Atre was born to Abasaheb and Indirabai Atre in Pune. As children, Atre and her sister, Usha, were interested in music, but neither of them planned to pursue music as a career. When Atre was eight, Indirabai was not keeping good health, and at a friend's suggestion that classical music lessons would help her feel better, she took a few lessons. Listening to those lessons inspired Atre to learn classical music.

Her music training was in the Guru-shishya tradition. She learnt classical music from Sureshbabu Mane and Hirabai Badodekar from the Kirana gharana. She acknowledged the influence of two successful artists, Amir Khan for khyal and Bade Ghulam Ali Khan for thumri, on her singing style. She also had formal training in Kathak dance style for a short period.

While studying music, Atre earned a Bachelor of Science from Fergusson College in Pune. Later she completed an LL.B. from University of Pune Law College. She also studied at Gandharva Mahavidyalaya Mandal (Sangeet Alankar (Master of Music)), Trinity Laban Conservatoire of Music and Dance, London (Western Music Theory Grade-IV). She later also earned a PhD in music. Her doctoral thesis was titled Sargam, and pertained to the use of sol-fa notes (sargam) in Indian classical music.

== Career ==
Atre had a short stint as a singing stage-actress in the early days of her career. She also played roles in a line-up of Marathi theatre classics, which included Sangeet Nataks like Sanshay-Kallol, Maanaapamaan, Saubhadra and Vidyaharan. She acted along with stage artists Ganpatrao Bodas, Chhota Gandharva, Ram Marathe, PL Deshpande, Prasad Savkar, Bhalchandra Pendharkar and created great impact with her effective singing style.

Atre was one of the senior vocalists in the country representing the Kirana Gharana. Her first LP was done with Maru Bihag, Kalavati and Khamaj Thumari. She contributed to popularizing Indian classical vocal music at global level, working in various musical genres such as Khyal, Thumri, Dadra, Ghazal, geet, Natyasangeet, and bhajans.

=== As a composer ===
- Book of compositions Swaranginee Swaranjanee and Swararangee.
- She also invented new Raags such as Apurva Kalyan, Darbari Kauns, Bhinna Kauns, Patdeep-Malhar, Shiv Kali, Shivani, Kalaheer, Tilang-bhairav, Ravi-Bhairav, Kaushik Bhairav and Madhur-kauns
- Music compositions adapted to full-length dance programme 'Nritya Prabha' – choreographed by the Bharatanatyam danseuse Sucheta Bhide Chapekar.
- Music composition adapted for jazz by Susanne Abbuehl from the Netherlands.
- Music composed for musical-dramas and Sangeetikas.

=== Related activities ===
Atre taught music, performing lecture-demonstrations, and writing on the topic of Indian classical music.

- An Assistant Producer with the All India Radio.
- Top Grade — by All India Radio and Doordarshan in classical vocal, light vocal, semi classical vocal and Drama Artist (Marathi and Hindi).
- Main female role in Professional Musical Dramas.(Sangeet Natak and Sangeetika)
- She was a visiting professor at a many institutions in the West, including the Rotterdam Conservatory in the Netherlands. Visiting professor at the Music conservatory – Montreux Switzerland, the University of California, Los Angeles, Indo-American Fellowship for studying research materials used in Ethnomusicology at the University of California, Los Angeles, and at the University of Calgary, Alberta, Canada.
- Appointment as 'Special Executive Magistrate' by the Government of Maharashtra in recognition of services to the cause of Music
- Professor and Head of the Dept. of Music, S.N.D.T. Woman's University, Mumbai.
- Around 1992, Atre started an annual Pandit Sureshbabu Mane and Hirabai Badodekar Sangeet Sammelan music festival. The festival takes place annually in December in Mumbai.
- Chief Music Producer and Director for 'Swarashree' Recording Company since 1981
- Member of the Advisory Panel of the Central Board of Film Censors, Mumbai 1984
- President 'Gaan Vardhan' – a well-known music organisation, Pune, for her last 22 years.
- 'Dr. Prabha Atrre Foundation' was registered in May 2000.
- Atre established some years ago Swaramayee Gurukul in Pune. This institution amalgamates traditional guru-shishya style of teaching music and contemporary classroom teaching.
- Atre had been concluding Sawai Gandharva Bhimsen Festival since 2007 which is considered to be prestigious.
- Dr Atre created a lecture series "Alok" to practically demonstrate her musical thoughts. It is available on YouTube and received very good public acclaim.

== Awards ==
- 1976 – Acharya Atre Award for music.
- Jagatguru Shankaracharya conferred the title "Gaan-Prabha"
- 1990 – Padma Shri
- 1991 – Sangeet Natak Academy Award
- Giants International Award, Rashtriya Kalidas samman
- Tagore Akademi Ratna Award announced from the Sangeet Natak Akademi in 2011
- Dinanath Mangeshkar award
- Hafiz Ali Khan Award
- Felicitation by Global Action Club International
- Govind-Lakshmi award
- Godavari Gaurav Puraskar
- Dagar Gharana Award
- Acharya Pandit Ram Narayan Foundation Award Mumbai
- Ustad Faiyyaz Ahmed Khan Memorial Award (Kirana Gharana)
- 'Kala-Shree 2002'
- 2002 – Padma Bhushan
- P.L. Deshpande Bahuroopi Sanman
- Sangeet Sadhana Ratna Award
- 'Lifetime achievement' award by the Pune University
- Mahim Ratna Award by Shivsena Mumbai
- Felicitation by the Mayor of Mumbai, Name included in national and international biographical works.
- State government Award to her book Swarmayee.
- From the year 2011 "Swarayoginee Dr. Prabha Atre Rashtriya Shaastreeya Sangeet Puraskar" instituted by Tatyasaheb Natu Trust and Gaanvardhan Pune.
- Working as a committee member for several social, educational, cultural institutions.
- Punya Bhushan
- Atal Ratna
- Chairman of Rasta Peth Education Society – a leading educational association in Pune for the last 12 years.
- 2022 – Padma Vibhushan
- Newsmakers Achievers Awards 2022

== Discography ==
1. Maru Bihag, Kalavati, Khamaj thumri
2. Niranjani – Puriya Kalyan, Shankara, Basant
3. Anant Prabha – Lalit, Bhinna Shadja, Bhairavi thumri
4. Bageshree, Khamaj thumri
5. Jogkauns, Todi, thumri
6. Malkauns, dadra
7. Chandrakauns
8. Madhukauns
9. Madhuvanti, Desi
10. Yaman, Bhairav
11. Shyam Kalyan, Bihag, Rageshree thumri
12. ghazal and bhajan recordings from live concerts from the 1970s

== Books ==
Books of music compositions: 1. Swaranjanee 2. Swaranginee 3. Swararangee

Books containing her musical thoughts: 1. Swaramayee (Marathi and Hindi) 2. Suswaralee (Marathi and Hindi) 3. Along the path of Music 4. Enlightening the listener

Book of poetry: Antah Swar (Marathi Hindi and English)

== Disciples ==
Atre gave private lessons to students beginning in 1969. Dr. Prabha Atre mentored numerous students through her skilled and dedicated teaching methods, many of whom later became well-known musicians in their own right. She was associated with SNDT Women’s University, Mumbai, where she served as a department head. From 1960 onwards, she toured extensively abroad to perform, teach, and propagate Indian classical music. She also established the Swaramayee Gurukul in Pune to train students in the traditional Guru–Shishya Parampara. Her noted disciples include Alka Joglekar, Vijaya Patki, Asha Parasnis, Padmini Rao, Chetna Banawat, Atindra Sarvadikar, Arati Thakur, Ashvini Modak, and Fumie Nigeshi, among others. As a tribute to Dr. Prabha Atre ji, four of her leading disciples—Arati Thakur, Atindra Sarvadikar, Chetna Banawat, and Ashvini Modak—presented a spellbinding concluding performance at the prestigious Sawai Gandharva Bhimsen Sangeet Samaroh, Pune, in 2024.
