= Bande Ali Khan =

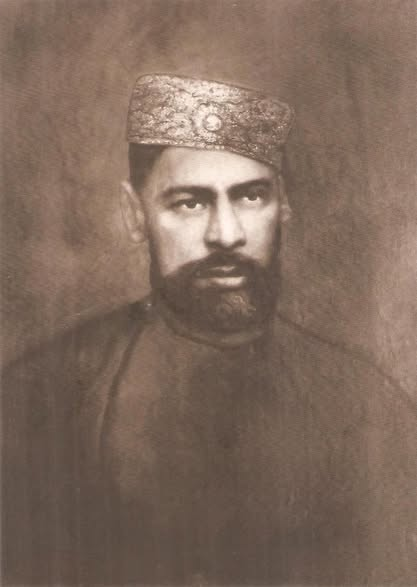

Background information
- Born: c. 1830; Saharanpur, North-Western Provinces, British India
- Origin: Kirana
- Died: c. 1896 Pune, Bombay Presidency, British India
- Genres: Indian classical music
- Occupation: Instrumentalist of Hindustani Classical music
- Years active: 1860s–1933

Bande Ali Khan, more commonly known as Ustad Bande Ali Khansaheb or Bande Ali Khan Beenkar, (c. 1830s – 1896) was an Indian classical rudra veena player. Known for being the most historically celebrated exponent of the been, Khan was an ancestor to major contemporary Hindustani Classical music gharanas including Indore, Mewati, Kirana, and Dagarbani.

After serving in the courts of Gwalior and Indore, Khan settled in Pune, making the city a hub for classical music before later dying there.

== Family ==
Bande Ali Khan was the son of Ghulam Zakir Khan or Sadiq Ali Khan of the Saharanpur gharana. He also received training from Behram Khan of Dagar bani, who - it is variously reported - was either his sister's husband or his mother's brother.

== Legacy ==
Many musicians at the Gwalior and Indore courts were influenced by Khan's music and adopted many of his aesthetics and practices.

Modern exponents of Bande Ali Khan's style includes Shamsuddin Faridi Desai.
