= Arkut Kannabhiran =

Pandit Arkut Kannabhiran (A Kanan)
- Born: 18 June 1920; Madras, India
- Origin: Madras, India
- Died: 12 September 2004 (aged 84) Kolkata, India
- Genres: Hindustani classical music, Semi classical music,
- Occupation: Vocalist
- Years active: 1935–2004

Arkut Kannabhiran (18 June 1920 – 12 September 2004), more popularly known as A. Kanan, was an Indian vocalist in the Hindustani classical tradition and one of the legendary vocalist from Kirana Gharana. He is known for the khayal form of singing to which he lent his individuality.

== Early life ==
Arkut Kannabhiran was born in Madras (present-day Chennai), in 1920. As he grew up he was interested in cricket as well as singing.

He began his professional career joining the railways at the age of 18. In his 20s, while in Bombay (present-day Mumbai) for a cricket match, he auditioned for the All India Radio station there. The auditioners were so impressed by his singing voice that they offered him a slot of air time. His job saw him posted at Hyderabad and here he began taking lessons in Hindustani classical music from Pandit Lahanu Babu Rao. Shortly after, he got transferred to Calcutta (now Kolkata) where he studied music with Girija Shankar Chakraborty. Subsequently, when his job required his transfer from Kolkata, he left the job and stayed on in the city. He later came in contact with the musician Amir Khan.

== Career ==
Arkut Kannabhiran made his formal debut in the world of Hindustani style of classical vocal music in 1943, when he performed at the All Bengal Music Conference in Kolkata. It was during his stay at Calcutta that he earned a name for himself by his melodious voice and personal style of gayaki that he developed. With greater acclaim he came to be better known as Pandit A.T. Kanan, with people not remembering him by his original name.

Kanan went on to become a regular on the All India Radio and was among the highest graded artists. His khayal renditions in Raga Jog, Rageshri, Bihag and Hansadhwani became popular across the country. The acclaimed Bengali filmmaker Ritwik Ghatak used his fast khayal "Laagi Lagan Pati Sakhi Sang" set in Raga Hansadhwani in his classic film Meghe Dhaka Tara. Today not many of Kanan's recordings survive.

In the 1950s, along with other musicians, Kanan founded the Calcutta Music Circle. Several young students had the opportunity of learning Hindustani classical music from him and went on to make names for themselves in later lives.

He was a Guru at ITC Sangeet Research Academy.

== Personal life ==
He was married to Malabika Kanan, another acclaimed Hindustani vocalist of the time.

== Death ==
Arkut Kannabhiran died in 2004, aged 84, at Kolkata.
