= Shrikant Deshpande =

Indian politician

- श्रीकांत देशपांडे

Member of Maharashtra Legislative Council
- In office July 2014 – July 2020
- Succeeded by: Kiranrao Sarnaik
- Constituency: Amravati Teacher constituency

Personal details
- Party: Shiv Sena

Shrikant Deshpande (Marathi: श्रीकांत देशपांडे) is an Indian politician belonging to the Shiv Sena party. He was member of the Maharashtra Legislative Council from Amravati Teacher constituency.

== Positions held ==
- 2014: Elected to Maharashtra Legislative Council
- 2001: Member of Railway Recruitment board.
- 1998: State selection board maharashtra.
