= Kirana gharana =

Genre in Hindustani classical music

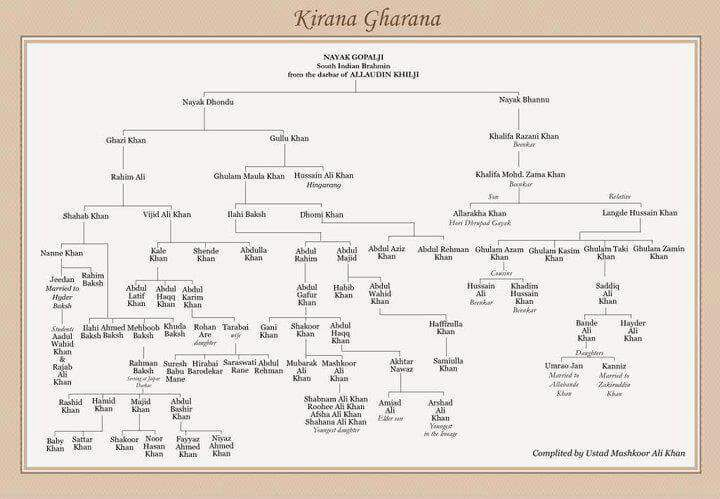
An illustration of the Kirana Gharana's ancestry prepared by Mashkoor Ali Khan.

The Kirana Gharana is a Hindustani music apprenticeship tradition (gharana) made popular by Bande Ali Khan in the 19th Century and his cousins Abdul Karim Khan and Abdul Wahid Khan. Evolved from the instrumental and vocal Gauharbani dhrupad lineages of medieval music maestros Nayak Gopal, Nayak Dhondu, and Nayak Bhanu. Later, this tradition came to be reputed for khayal, thumri, dadra, ghazal, bhajan, abhang, and natya sangeet. This gharana is known for producing acclaimed musicians like Sawai Gandharva, Sureshbabu Mane, Hirabai Barodekar, Amir Khan, Gangubai Hangal, Bhimsen Joshi, Roshanara Begum, Mohammed Rafi, Prabha Atre, Mashkoor Ali Khan Kaivalya Kumar Gurav, Pran Nath, Anand Bhate, Sanhita Nandi, and Jayateerth Mevundi. Consequently, this gharana developed a reputation for its distinctly sweet, devotional, and intense vocalism.

== Background ==
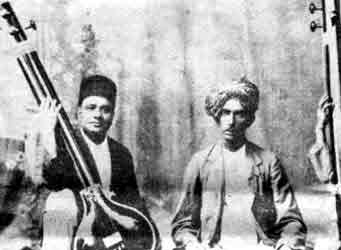
Photograph of Abdul Karim Khan in performance supported by his student, Sawai Gandharva, on tanpura.

Awareness about the Kirana Gharana grew with the rising status of Beenkar Bande Ali Khan in the Gwalior Court and Indore Court in the mid-19th Century. Due to his fame, members of his extended family, such as vocalists Abdul Karim Khan and Abdul Wahid Khan, began describing themselves as from the same gharana. The Kirana Gharana takes its name from the birth place of Bande Ali Khan, Kairana, though the family is said to originate from Saharanpur District. Bande Ali Khan is arguably the most influential Hindustani Classical instrumentalist of the 19th Century. In its initial decades, the importance of Kirana Gharana was derived from his status. Since, the fame of Abdul Karim Khan and Abdul Wahid Khan extended the gharana's name which came to be associated with singing.

== History ==
In the 19th Century, the Kirana gharana coalesced around Bande Ali Khan, a renowned musician of the rudra veena. The gharana's style was further developed, and established as one of the prominent styles in modern Hindustani classical music in the early 20th Century by musicians Abdul Karim Khan and Abdul Wahid Khan.

The Kirana Gharana includes an extensive family of musicians and their traditions which can be distinguished by four lineages: that of Bande Ali Khan, Abdul Karim Khan, Abdul Wahid Khan, and Fayyaz Ahmed & Niyaz Ahmed Khan.

=== Bande Ali Khan ===
Bande Ali Khan was one of the most influential musicians in the 19th Century. Though he directly taught few musicians, his influence expanded to many other musicians and their gharanas. Those claiming to be his disciples come from Mewati Gharana, Etawah Gharana, Sonipat-Panipat Gharana, Indore Gharana, and others.

=== Abdul Karim Khan ===
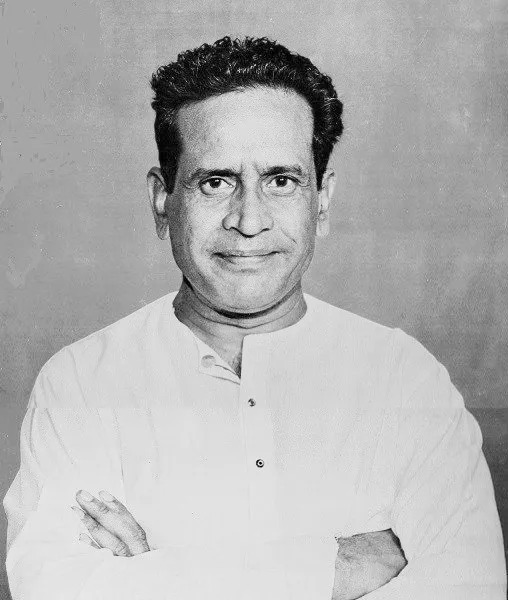
Bhimsen Joshi, among the most famous members of the Kirana Gharana and heir of Abdul Karim Khan's style.

Abdul Karim Khan was one of the most influential classical musicians in the 20th Century. He was an extremely popular musician across the subcontinent. His success proved highly influential in popularizing the Kirana Gharana.

A frequent visitor to the Court of Mysore, Abdul Karim Khan was also influenced by Carnatic music.

Owing to his popularity, most contemporary Hindustani musicians from Karnataka are exponents of Kirana gharana, and Kirana gharana in turn has absorbed many of the features of the Carnatic tradition. The border region between Karnataka and Maharashtra is particularly associated with this gharana.

Abdul Karim Khan's tradition continued with Sawai Gandharva, Sureshbabu Mane, Gangubai Hangal, Bhimsen Joshi, Kaivalya Kumar Gurav, Jayateerth Mevundi, and Anand Bhate.

=== Abdul Wahid Khan ===
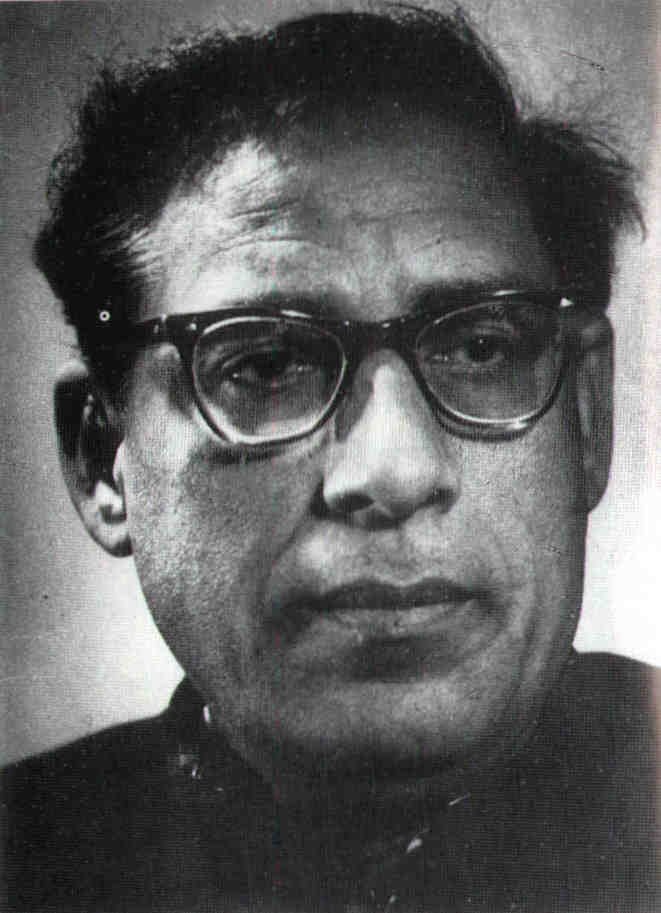
Photograph of Amir Khan. Though from the Bhendi Bazaar tradition of Moradabad, his time with Abdul Wahid Khan at the Indore Court left a great impression on his musical philosophy.

The other primary master of the gharana, in the early 20th century, was Abdul Karim Khan's cousin Abdul Wahid Khan who chose to settle at Lahore, Pakistan after the 1947 Partition of British India.

Abdul Wahid Khan's tradition continued with Pran Nath, Hirabai Barodekar, Amir Khan, Prabha Atre, and Venkatesh Kumar.

=== Fayyaz Ahmed & Niyaz Ahmed Khan ===
Brothers Fayyaz Ahmed & Niyaz Ahmed Khan became popular in the 1960s due to their jugalbandi performances. The duo earned much appreciation and respect from musicians, critics, and audiences. They represent a branch of the Kirana Gharana family distinct from Bande Ali Khan, Abdul Karim Khan, and Abdul Wahid Khan, but share the same ancestors.

== Philosophy ==
=== Aesthetics ===
==== Vocalism ====
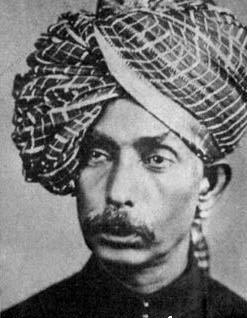
Photograph of Abdul Karim Khan who was celebrated for the extraordinary sweetness and tunefulness of his voice.

The central concern of the Kirana style is swara, or individual notes, in particular precise tuning and expression of notes. In the Kirana Gayaki (singing style), the individual notes (swaras) of the raga are not just random points in the scale, but independent realms of music capable of horizontal expansion. Emotional pukars in the higher octaves form a part of the musical experience. Another unique feature of this gharana is the intricate and ornate use of the sargam taan (weaving patterns with the notations themselves) introduced by Abdul Karim Khan under influence from the Carnatic classical style.

==== Tempo ====
In the late nineteenth century Abdul Karim Khan and Abdul Wahid Khan revolutionized the khayal gayaki by introducing the vilambit (a slow tempo section) to delineate the structure of the raga note by note.

=== Repertoire ===
==== Ragas ====
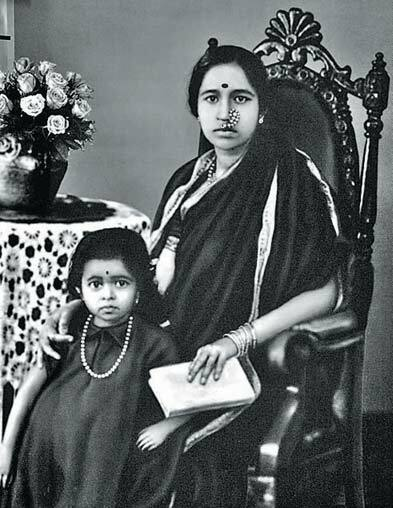
Photograph of Gangubai Hangal with her daughter and student, Krishna Hangal. Both have become regarded for bringing feminine sensibilities to the Kirana style.

Ragas frequently performed by musicians of the Kirana Gharana include Miyan Ki Todi, Lalit, Multani, Patdeep, Puriya, Marwa, Shuddha Kalyan, Darbari Kanada, and Komal Rishabh Asavari. P. L. Deshpande commented that performers from the Kirana gharana are particularly fond of the komal rishabh note, a frequent feature of these commonly performed ragas.

The Kirana Gharana also uniquely possesses many rare ragas including Suryakauns, Hindolita, Kalashri, Lalit Bhatiyar, Marwa Shree, and others.

Kumar Prasad Mukherjee noted Abdul Karim Khan's gifted ability to "revel" in "lighter ragas" like Gara, Barwa, Pilu, Khamaj, Kafi, and Tilak Kamod.

==== Bandishes ====
Mukherjee notes that Kirana Gharana musicians uniquely possess compositions by Hussain Ali Khan "Hingarang" and "Sabras."

== Ancestral pedagogy of Kirana Gharana ==
This tree details the hereditary lineage of the Kirana Gharana based on several documented accounts.

Nayak; Gopal
Nayak; Bhannu	Nayak; Dhondu
Ramzani Khan (Beenkar)	Gullu Khan	Gazi; Khan
Mohammed Zama; Khan (Beenkar)	Hussain Ali; Khan "Hingarang"	Ghulam Maula; Khan	Rahim Ali; Khan
Allarakha Khan (Dhrupadiya)	Langde Hussain; Khan	Ilahi Baksh	Dhumi; Khan	Shahab; Khan	Vajid Ali; Khan
Ghulam Taki; Khan	Ghalum Kasim; Khan	Ghalum Zamin; Khan	Ghalum Azam; Khan	Abdul Majid; Khan	Abdul Rahim; Khan	Abdul Aziz; Khan	Nanne; Khan	Mehboob; Baksh	Kale; Khan	Abdulla; Khan	Shende; Khan
Sadiq Ali; Khan	Khadin Hussain; Khan	Hussain Ali (Beenkar)	Habeeb; Khan	Abdul Wahid; Khan	Abdul Gafur; Khan	Abdul Razaq; Khan	Abdul Rehman; Khan	Rahim; Baksh	Hyder Baksh; Khan	Rahman; Baksh Khan	Abdul Karim; Khan	Abdul Haqq; Khan	Abdul Latif; Khan
Haider Ali; Khan	Bande Ali; Khan (Beenkar)	Hafizullah; Khan	Abdul Haqq; Khan	Shakoor; Khan	Gani; Khan	Abdul Bashir; Khan	Majid; Khan	Hamid; Khan	Sureshbabu; Mane	Hirabai; Badodekar	Abdul Rehhman; Khan	Saraswati; Rane
Kanniz; Begum	Umrao; Begum	Samiulla; Khan	Akhtar Nawaz; Khan	Mubarak Ali; Khan	Mashkoor; Ali Khan	Niyaz & Fayyaz; Ahmed Khan	Noor Hasan; Khan	Sattar; Khan	Babu; Khan
Amjad Ali; Khan	Arshad Ali; Khan	Shahana; Ali Khan	Riyaz Ahmed; Khan	Sarfaraz; Ahmed Khan

== Lineage ==
Gopal Nayak
Nayak Dhondu	Nayak Bhannu
Ghulam Ali	Ghulam Maula
Utd. Bande Ali Khan
Utd. Eliahee Baksh Khan	Utd. Abdullah Khan	Utd. Kale Khan	Utd. Nanhe Khan
Utd. Majid Khan	Utd. Abdul Habib Khan	Utd. Abdul Karim Khan (founder)	Utd. Abdul Haq Khan
Utd. Abdul Wahid Khan
Pt. Balkrishnabuwa Kapileshwari	Pt. Sawai Gandharva	Pt. Ganpatrao Gurav
Pt. Vishwanathbuwa Jadhav	Pt. Sureshbabu Mane	Pt. Ganpatbuwa Behere	Pt. Dasharathbuwa Muley
Smt. Hirabai Badodekar	Pt. Shankarrao Sarnaik
Pran Nath	Begum Akhtar	Pt. Sukhdev Prasad	Utd. Shakoor Khan (sarangiya)	Smt. Saraswati Rane	Master Krishnarao)	Smt. Gangubai Hangal
Utd. Hafizullah Khan	Mohammed Rafi (playback singer)	Pt. Ram Narayan (sarangiya)	Pt. Baburao Jadhav	Pt. Basavaraj Rajguru	Firoz Dastur	Bharat Ratna Pt. Bhimsen Joshi	Roshan Ara Begum	Pt. Nivruttibuwa Sarnaik	Pt. Sangmeshwar Gurav
Pt. Rajaram Jadhav
Pt. Mani Prasad	Mashkoor; Ali Khan	Smt. Shakuntalaraje Jadhav	Dr. Prabha Atre	Pt. Chandrakant Kapileshwari	Smt. Krishna Hangal	Shrikant Deshpande	Pt. Madhav Gudi	Sripathi Padigar
Pt. Pandurang Jadhav
Marian Zazeela	La; Monte; Young	Terry; Riley	Shabda; Kahn	Smt. Pranati Mhatre	Pt. Parameshwar Hegde	Milind Chittal	Anand Bhate	Shrinivas Joshi	Rajendra Kandalgaonkar	Pt. Kaivalya Kumar Gurav
Michael; Harrison	Arati Thakur
Jung Hee Choi	Nachiketa Yakkundi	Srivani Jade	Pt. Nagaraja Rao Havaldar	Prasanna Gudi	Jayateerth Mevundi	Balachandra Prabhu	Vijaykumar Patil
Amjad; Ali Khan	Arshad; Ali Khan
Omkarnath Havaldar

== Exponents ==
=== 19th century ===
- Sadiq Ali Khan, learned from Ghulam Taki Khan. Associated with Qawwal Bacchon ka Gharana.
- Bande Ali Khan (1826–1896), learned from father Sadiq Ali Khan. Married daughter of Haddu Khan of Gwalior Gharana.

=== 20th century ===
- Abdul Karim Khan (1872–1937), gharana founder. Learned from father Kale Khan.
- Abdul Wahid Khan (1885–1949), cousin of Abdul Karim Khan and gharana co-founder
- Vishwanathbuwa Jadhav (1885–1964), learned from Abdul Karim Khan.
- Sawai Gandharva (1886–1952), learned from Abdul Karim Khan.
- Panchakshara Gawai (1892–1944), learned from Abdul Wahid Khan.
- Sukhdev Prasad (c. 1890s–c. 1960s), learned from Abdul Wahid Khan.
- Balkrishnabuwa Kapileshwari (1896–1982), learned from Abdul Karim Khan.
- Abdul Ghani Khan (c. 1900s–c. 1970s), learned from father Abdul Gafur Khan.
- Deenanath Mangeshkar (1900–1942), learned from Sukhdev Prasad.
- Sureshbabu Mane (1902–1953), son of Abdul Karim Khan. Learned from father and Abdul Wahid Khan.
- Hirabai Barodekar (1905–1989), daughter of Abdul Karim Khan. Learned from brother Sureshbabu Mane and Abdul Wahid Khan.
- Shakoor Khan (1905–1970), sarangiya who learned from maternal uncle Abdul Wahid Khan.
- Amir Khan (1913–1974), influenced by ans possibly learned from Abdul Wahid Khan.
- Saraswati Rane (1913–2006), daughter of Abdul Karim Khan. Learned from siblings Sureshbabu Mane and Hirabai Badodekar.
- Gangubai Hangal (1913–2009), learned from Sawai Gandharva.
- Puttaraj Gawai (1914–2010), learned from Panchakshara Gawai.
- Baburao Jadhav (1915–1976), learned from father Vishwanathbuwa jadhav.
- Basavaraj Rajguru (1917–1991), learned from Panchakshara Gawai, Sureshbabu Mane, and Abdul Wahid Khan.
- Roshan Ara Begum (1917–1982), learned from uncle Abdul Karim Khan.
- Pandit Pran Nath (1918–1996), learned from Abdul Wahid Khan.
- Firoz Dastur (1919–2008), learned from Sawai Gandharva.
- Manik Varma (1920–1996), learned from Sureshbabu Mane and Hirabai Barodekar.
- A. Kanan (1920–2004), learned from Girija Shankar Chakraborty.
- Sangeetacharya Usha Ranjan Mukherjee (1920–1992), learned from Amir Khan.
- Pandit Krishnanand (1920–2003), learned from Bheema Rao.
- Vasantrao Deshpande (1920–1983), learned from Sureshbabu Mane and Hirabai Barodekar.
- Rajaram Jadhav (1921–1976), learned from father Vishwanathbuwa Jadhav.
- Bhimsen Joshi (1922–2011), learned from Sawai Gandharva
- Shakuntalaraje Jadhav (1923–2004), learned from husband Rajaram Jadhav and father-in-law Vishwanathbuwa Jadhav.
- Mani Prasad (1929–2023), learned from father Sukhdev Prasad.
- Sheila Dhar (1929–2001), learned from Fayyaz Ahmed & Niyaz Ahmed Khan.
- Krishna Hangal (1929–2004), learned from mother Gangubai Hangal.
- Prabha Atre (1932–2024), learned from Sureshbabu Mane and Hirabai Barodekar.
- Chandrakant Kapileshwari (1935–2024), learned from father Balkrishnabuwa Kapileshwari.
- Tej Bahadur Sahney (1936–2012), learned from B. N. Dutta Lahorwale.
- Chhannulal Mishra (1936-2025), learned from Abdul Ghani Khan.
- Madhava Gudi (1941–2011), learned from Bhimsen Joshi
- Shripati Padigar (c. 1940s–c. 2010s), learned from Bhimsen Joshi.
- Pandit Arun Bahaduri (1943–2018), learned from A. Kanan.
- Nagnath Wodeyar (b. 1944), learned from Gangubai Hangal.
- Niaz Ahmed (1946–2019), maternal descendant of Kirana Gharana.
- Shrikant Deshpande (1948–2011), grandson of Sawai Gandharva. Learned from Bhimsen Joshi.
- Ashique Ali Khan (1948–1999), learned from grandfather Allah Rakkha Khan and father Mehfooz Ahmed Khan.
- Sumitra Guha (b. c. 1950s), learned from A. Kanan.
- Venkatesh Kumar (born 1953), learned from Puttaraj Gawai.
- Shree Rani Madalsa (b. 1957), learned from Chandrakant Kapileshwari.
- Pandit Vishwanath (b. 1957), learned from Mani Prasad.
- Nagaraj Rao Havaldar (b. 1959), learned from Madhava Gudi
- Milind Chittal (b. 1959), learned from Firoz Dastur.
- Padmini Rao (b. c. 1950s), learned from Prabha Atre.
- Mashkoor Ali Khan (b. 1957), learned from father Shakoor Khan.
- Girish Sanzgiri (b. c. 1960s), learned from Firoz Dastur.
- Dr.Kanika Bhattacharya learned from her father Sangeetacharya Usha Ranjan Mukherjee.
- Rafiq Ahmed Khan (Sarangi)
- Kaivalya Kumar Gurav (b. 1963), learned from father Sangameshwar Gurav.
- Pandit Harish Tiwari (b. 1960s), learned from Bhimsen Joshi.
- Jayateerth Mevundi (born 1972), learned from Shripathi Padigar.

=== 21st Century ===
- Sanhita Nandi (born 1970), learnt from Pandit A kanan and Ustad Mashkoor Ali khan.
- Anand Bhate (born 1971), learned from Bhimsen Joshi.
- Shirin Sengupta Nath (b. c. 1970s), learned from A.Kanan and Arun Bhaduri.
- Sandip Bhattacharjee (b. 1980), learned from Mashkoor Ali Khan and Mubarak Ali Khan.
- Amjad Ali Khan (Indian vocalist) (b. 1980), learned from uncles Mashkoor Ali Khan and Mubarak Ali Khan.
- Arshad Ali Khan (born 1984), learned from father Akhtar Nawaz Khan and uncles Mashkoor Ali Khan and Mubarak Ali Khan.
- Balachandra Prabhu (b. 1990s), learned from Shripathi Padigar and Jayateerth Mevundi.
- Mohd Danish (b. 1996), learned from grandfathers Afzal Khan and Irshad Ahmed Warsi.

== Bibliography ==
- Roshan Ara Begum (1994). Kirana. Gramophone Co. of India.
- Carolyn M. Starr (1984). Intonation in the Kirana Gharana: A Pilot Study. Mills college.
- Bonnie C. Wade (1984). Khyāl: Creativity Within North India's Classical Music Tradition. CUP Archive. ISBN 978-0-521-25659-9.
- Peter Lavezzoli (2006). The Dawn of Indian Music in the West. Continuum. ISBN 978-0-8264-1815-9.
- ‘’Kirana Gharana - Tradition, Evolution and Changing Trends’’, by Dr. Atindra Sarvadikar, English Tr. by Aashay Gune. Sanskar Prakashan, 2025, ASIN B0G48GJC38.
