= Gangubai Hangal =

Indian Hindustani classical vocalist (1913–2009)

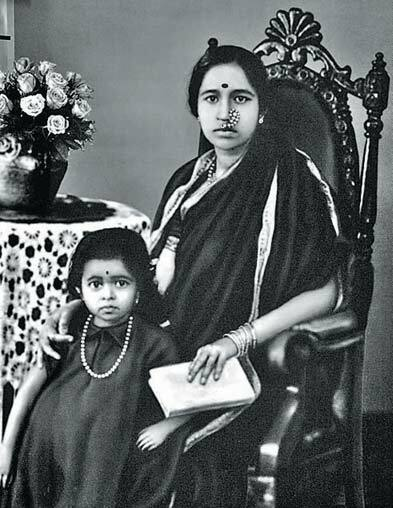
- Gangubai with her daughter Krishna

Background information
- Born: 5 March 1913; Hangal, Karnataka, India
- Origin: Dharwad, Karnataka, India
- Died: 21 July 2009 (aged 96) Hubli, Karnataka, India
- Genre: Hindustani classical music
- Occupation: singer
- Years active: 1913–2009

Gangubai Hangal (5 March 1913 – 21 July 2009) was an Indian singer of the khayal genre of Hindustani classical music from Karnataka, who was known for her deep and powerful voice. Hangal belonged to the Kirana gharana.

She was awarded the Padma Vibhushan, India's second highest civilian honour in 2002 and Sangeet Natak Akademi Fellowship, the highest award of Sangeet Natak Akademi, India's National Academy for Music and Performing Arts in 1996.

== Early life and musical training ==
Gangubai Hangal was born in Dharwad to Chikkurao Nadiger, an agriculturist and Ambabai, a vocalist of Carnatic music.Ambabai comes from a Devadasi background and is well-versed in ancient musical scores, having studied under renowned classical musician and scholar.After Ambabai discovered her daughter's musical talent, Gangubai began receiving artistic training as a Devadasi. Hangal received only elementary education and her family shifted to Hubli in 1928 so that Gangubai could study Hindustani music. She began to train formally aged 13 with Krishnacharya Hulgur, a Kinnari Veena player, studying Hindustani classical music. From Hulgur, Gangubai learned sixty compositions in one year before he stopped teaching her after an argument about his fees. She also learned from Dattopant Desai, one of the prominent and professional harmonist with raga and a self established person worked hard to obtain freedom, who taught Smt Ganagubai Hangal for several years and later passed the batton over to Sawai Gandharva, a respected guru. Hangal could only study sporadically under Gandharva when he returned to his home, but she received an intensive training of three years after he relocated permanently to Hubli.

== Musical career ==
Hangal's mother's family was considered to be of low social status and for women of her generation singing was not considered appropriate employment; Hangal struggled against this prejudice and made a career. She performed all over India and for All India Radio stations until 1945. Hangal had initially performed light classical genres, including bhajan and thumri, but concentrated on khyal.

Later, however, she refused to sing light classical, saying she sang only ragas. Hangal served as honorary music professor of the Karnataka University. She gave her last concert in March 2006 to mark her 75th career year. Krishna Hangal, her daughter, would often provide her vocal support in concerts.

== Personal life ==
Hangal married at age 16 to Gururao Kaulgi, a Brahmin lawyer. They had two sons, Narayan Rao and Babu Rao, and one daughter, Krishna, who died from cancer in 2004, aged 75. Krishna, who predeceased her more famous mother, was herself a performing musician who presented concerts. Gangubai had overcome bone marrow cancer in 2003, and died of cardiac arrest at the age of 96, on 21 July 2009, in Hubli, where she resided. She had her eyes donated to increase awareness for organ donation.

== Death ==
Gangubai died on July 21, 2009. The Karnataka state government declared two days of mourning for Hangal. A state funeral was announced for 22 July in Hubli by the district commissioner of the Dharwad district.

== Awards and honors ==
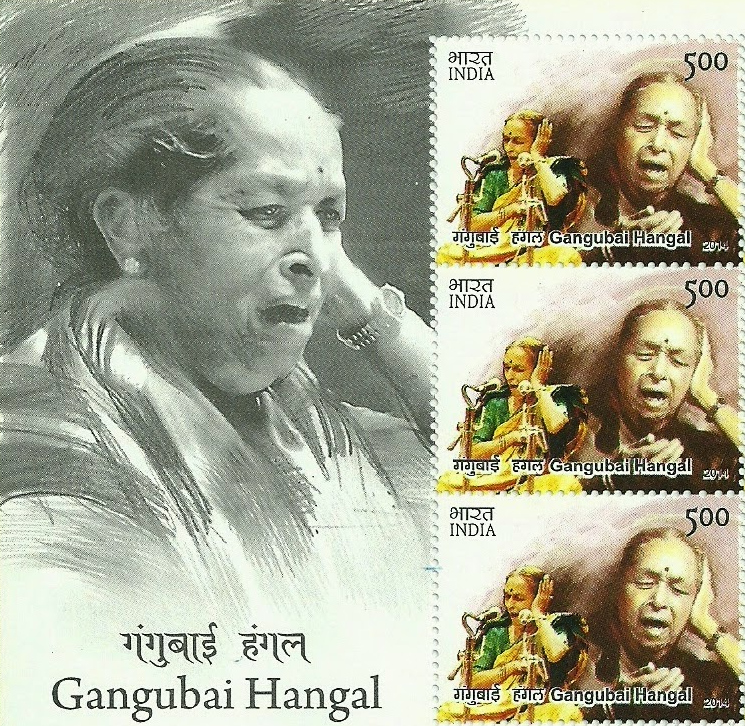
Hangal on a 2014 stamp sheet of India

Gangubai Hangal received a number of awards, which include:

- Karnataka Sangeet Nritya Academy Award, 1962
- Padma Bhushan, 1971
- Sangeet Natak Akademi Award, 1973
- Sangeet Natak Akademi Fellowship, 1996
- Padma Vibhushan, 2002

In 2008, The State Government of Karnataka decided to name the proposed Karnataka State Music University, Mysore after Gangubhai Hangal. Subsequently, the Karnataka State Dr. Gangubai Hangal Music and Performing Arts University Act, 2009 has been passed by the State Legislature. Presently the Karnataka State Dr. Gangubhai Hangal Music and Performing Arts University operates from Mysore, Karnataka.

Gangothri — the birthplace of Gangubai Hangal — has been converted into a museum by the Government of Karnataka.

Dr Gangubai Hangal Gurukul in Hubli trains artists in traditional Guru-Shishya parampara to become performing artists.

In September 2014, a postage stamp featuring Hangal was released by India Post commemorating her contributions to Hindustani music.

== See also ==
- Bhimsen Joshi
