= Abdul Wahid Khan =

Indian Hindustani classical vocalist (1871–1949)

Ustad Abdul Wahid Khan
- Born: 1871; Kirana, British India
- Died: 1949 (aged 77–78) Saharanpur, India
- Genre: Indian Classical Music
- Occupations: Singer, Indian Classical vocalist, One of the founders of Kirana Gharana of Classical Music

Ustad Abdul Wahid Khan (1871–1949) was an Indian subcontinental singer from the Kirana gharana. He died in 1949 in Saharanpur, near Delhi, India.

== Early life and background ==
Ustad Abdul Wahid Khan was born in Kirana, Uttar Pradesh in 1871. The town of Kirana was home to many families of musicians from the Mughal court, who migrated from Delhi after the Mughal Empire fell in 1857. Kirana gharana's three disciplines are rudraveena, sarangi and vocals - Kirana Style of Singing is with sweetness of tone, delightful and ornate.

Ustad Abdul Wahid Khan initially learned vocal and sarangi from his father, Ustad Abdul Majid Khan. Around age 12, he moved to Kolhapur to learn from Ustad Langde Haider Baksh Khan, a disciple of Bande Ali Khan, a famous master of veena and vocal music.

Ustad Abdul Wahid Khan founded the Kirana gharana musical family with his cousin Ustad Abdul Karim Khan in the late 19th century. Ustad Abdul Karim Khan had married Ustad Abdul Wahid Khan's sister, Ghafooran Bibi. The relationship between Abdul Wahid Khan and Abdul Karim Khan later soured when Abdul Karim neglected Ghafooran Bibi and married his student, Tarabai Mane. Abdul Wahid Khan's hearing was deficient and he was sometimes referred to as Behre Wahid Khan (Deaf Wahid Khan). Wahid Khan's son Ustad Hafizullah Khan was born in 1946. Hafizullah's uncles trained him in music, and he became a Sarangi player.

== Singing career ==
Ustad Abdul Wahid Khan forbade recordings of his performances to avoid imitation by other singers. Only three of his performances survived, recordings of the ragas Patdip, Multani, and Darbari Kanada, accompanied by Chatur Lal on tabla. They were preserved by music producer Jivan Lal Mattoo, who secretly recorded a radio broadcast in 1947, 2 years before his death, to document Khan's style.

"Although a youthful prodigy of the Kolhapur court, remaining unchallenged after his public debut there at age 18, Ustad Abdul Wahid Khan had no inclination to spend time singing in the courts. Instead he lived a devout, reclusive life, singing in the presence of holy men and at the tombs of Sufi saints and only occasionally sang in public."

== Death and legacy ==
Ustad Abdul Wahid Khan died as an Indian national in 1949 in Saharanpur, near Delhi. Ustad Abdul Wahid Khan's students included Pandit Jaichand Bhatt (Khyal Singer), Sureshbabu Mane, Hirabai Barodekar, Begum Akhtar, Malika Pukhraj, film music director Feroz Nizami, Saraswatibai Rane, Pran Nath, Sukhdev Prasad, Ram Narayan.

Ustad Abdul Wahid Khan and Ustad Abdul Karim Khan's evolution of the vilambit khyal inspired Amir Khan to develop his trademark ati vilambit singing.

Ustad Abdul Wahid Khan evolved the classical Hindustani music by extending recitals of a raga from approximately 20 minutes to up to an hour. Ustad Abdul Wahid Khan was one of the greatest icons of the Kirana gharana.
