= Sargam (music) =

Singing the notes, not the words, of a musical composition

Sargam refers to singing the notes, mostly commonly used in Indian music, instead of the words of a composition, with use of various ornamentations such as meend, gamak, kan and khatka, as part of a khyal performance. This is generally done in medium-tempo as a bridge between the alap and taan portions.

As an example, one could sing PmRSnSRRSRnSPnmPgmnnPmgmRSnS in raga Adana, given that raga's vadi-samvadi and the rules of the raga (see swara for explanation of the notes).

The musical octave is said to have evolved from the elaborate and elongated chants of Sama Veda, based on these basic swaras. Shiksha is the subject that deals with phonetics and pronunciation. Naradiya Shiksha elaborately discusses the nature of swaras, both Vedic chants and the octave.

== See also ==
- Solfege
- Solmization
