= Bhimsen Joshi =

Indian Hindustani classical vocalist (1922-2011)

Pandit Bhimsen Joshi
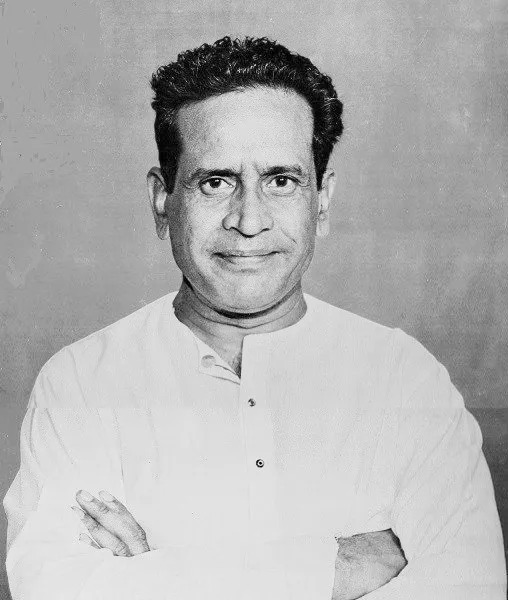
- Joshi in 1962
- Born: Bhimsen Gururaj Joshi; 4 February 1922; Ron, Gadag, Karnataka, India
- Died: 24 January 2011 (aged 88); Pune, Maharashtra, India
- Occupation: Hindustani Classical Vocalist
- Years active: 1941–2000
- Parent(s): Gururajrao Joshi (father); Rama bai (mother)
- Awards: Padma Shri (1972); Padma Bhushan (1985); Sangeet Natak Akademi Fellowship (1998); Padma Vibhushan (1999); Maharashtra Bhushan (2002); Karnataka Ratna (2005); Bharat Ratna (2008)
- Musical career
- Genre: khayal; (in the form of bhajans and abhangs)
- Instruments: Vocals; Harmonium; Tanpura

Bhimsen Gururaj Joshi (/ˌbiːmsɛn ˈdʒoʊʃɪ/; BHEEM-SAYN joe-SHEE; 4 February 1922 – 24 January 2011), also known by the honorific prefix Pandit, was an Indian vocalist. He sang in the Hindustani classical tradition. He is known for the khayal form of singing, as well as for his popular renditions of devotional music (bhajans and abhangs). Joshi belongs to the Kirana gharana tradition of Hindustani Classical Music. He is noted for his concerts, and between 1964 and 1982 Joshi toured Afghanistan, Italy, France, Canada and USA. He was the first musician from India whose concerts were advertised through posters in New York City. Joshi was instrumental in organising the Sawai Gandharva Music Festival annually, as homage to his guru, Sawai Gandharva.

In 1998, he was awarded the Sangeet Natak Akademi Fellowship, the highest honour conferred by Sangeet Natak Akademi, India's National Academy for Music, Dance and Drama. Subsequently, he received the Bharat Ratna, India's highest civilian honour, in 2008.

== Early life ==
Bhimsen Joshi was born on 4 February 1922 in a Kannada Deshastha Madhva Brahmin family to Gururajrao Joshi and Godavaribai at Ron in Gadag district in Karnataka. His father, Gururaj Joshi, was a school teacher. Bhimsen was the eldest among 16 siblings. He lost his mother at a young age.

As a child, Joshi was fascinated with music and musical instruments like the harmonium and tanpura and would often follow processions accompanied by music bands. This exercise often tired him and he would curl up somewhere and sleep, forcing his parents to go to the police after efforts to trace him failed. Fed up, his father Gururajacharya Joshi came up with the solution, writing "son of teacher Joshi" on Joshi's shirts. This worked and those who found the boy sleeping would safely deposit him back to his house.

== Musical training ==
His first music teacher was Channappa of Kurtakoti of dhobi community, who had trained with the veteran singer Inayat Khan. After learning Ragas Bhairav and Bhimpalasi, the one and only unique vigorous style of rendering he developed along with advanced trainings by other teachers is attributed to the basic training he received from Channappa.

=== Searching for a guru ===
Joshi heard a recording of Abdul Karim Khan's Thumri "Piya Bin Nahi Aavat Chain" in Raga Jhinjhoti when he was a child, which inspired him to become a musician. During this time, he also heard Pandit Sawai Gandharva at a performance in Kundgol. In 1933, the 11-year-old Joshi left Dharwad for Bijapur to find a master and learn music. With the help of money lent by his co-passengers in the train, Joshi reached Dharwad first, briefly studying with Dharwad-native Pt. Gururao Deshpande, and later went to Pune. Later he moved to Gwalior and got into Madhava Music School, a school run by Maharajas of Gwalior, with the help of famous sarod player Hafiz Ali Khan. He traveled for three years around North India, including in Delhi, Kolkata, Gwalior, Lucknow and Rampur, trying to find a good guru. He met Ustad Mushtaq Husain Khan of Rampur Gharana and stayed for more than one year. Eventually, his father succeeded in tracking him down in Jalandhar and brought young Joshi back home.

=== Sawai Gandharva ===
In 1936, Sawai Gandharva, a native of Dharwad, agreed to be his guru. Joshi stayed at his house in the guru-shishya (teacher-student) tradition. Joshi continued his training with Sawai Gandharva. His senior fellow student was Gangubai Hangal of Besta (fishermen) community, whom Joshi used to respectfully address as akka (elder sister).

== Career ==
Joshi first performed live in 1941 at the age of 19. His debut album, containing a few devotional songs in Marathi and Hindi, was released by His Master's Voice the next year in 1942. Later Joshi moved to Mumbai in 1943 and worked as a radio artist. His performance at a concert in 1946 to celebrate his guru Sawai Gandharva's 60th birthday won him accolades both from the audience and his guru. In 1984, he received his 1st Platinum Disc, being the first Hindustani Vocalist to receive the award.

=== Hindustani classical music ===
Joshi's performances have been acknowledged by music critics such as S. N. Chandrashekhar of the Deccan Herald to be marked by spontaneity, accurate notes, dizzyingly-paced taans which make use of his exceptional voice training, and a mastery over rhythm. In his especially mid singing career (i.e. the 60s & 70s) Joshi's most iconic and noticeable trait was his use of swift and long aakar taans, exemplifying tremendous and almost unrivalled breath-control, although he rarely used sargam taans. The Hindu, in an article written after he was awarded the Bharat Ratna, said: Bhimsen Joshi was ever the wanderer, engendering brilliant phrases and tans more intuitively than through deliberation. Joshi occasionally employed the use of sargam and tihai, and often sang traditional compositions of the Kirana gharana. His music often injected surprising and sudden turns of phrase, for example through the unexpected use of boltaans. Over the years, his repertoire tended to favour a relatively small number of complex and serious ragas; however, he remained one of the most prolific exponents of Hindustani classical music. Some of Joshi's more popular ragas include Shuddha Kalyan, Miyan Ki Todi, Puriya Dhanashri, Multani, Bhimpalasi, Darbari, Malkauns, Abhogi, Lalit, Yaman, Asavari Todi, Miyan ki malhar and Ramkali. He was a purist who has not dabbled in experimental forms of music, except for a series of Jugalbandi recordings with the Carnatic singer M. Balamuralikrishna.

Joshi's singing has been influenced by many musicians, including Smt. Kesarbai Kerkar, Begum Akhtar and as aforementioned, Ustad Amir Khan. Joshi assimilated into his own singing various elements that he liked in different musical styles and Gharanas. He along with Smt. Gangubai Hangal along with others took Kirana gharana to heights and are proudly referred as worthy son and daughter of kirana gharana. Both were from Old Dharwad district.

Pandit Purshottam Walawalkar used to accompany Pandit Bhimsen Joshi on the harmonium. Also Pandit Tulsidas Borkar used to accompany Panditji on the harmonium.

=== Devotional music ===
In devotional music, Joshi was most acclaimed for his Hindi, Marathi and Kannada Bhajan singing. He has recorded bhakti songs in Marathi, Santavani, Kannada Dasavani.

=== Patriotic music ===
Joshi was widely recognised in India due to his performance in the Mile Sur Mera Tumhara music video (1988), which begins with him and which was composed originally by him when he was asked to do so by the then Prime Minister Rajiv Gandhi. The video was created for the purpose of national integration in India, and highlights the diversity of Indian culture. Joshi was also a part of Jana Gana Mana produced by A. R. Rahman on the occasion of the 50th year of Indian Republic.

=== Playback singing ===
Joshi sang for several films, including Basant Bahar (1956) with Manna Dey, in Marathi movie "Swayamvar zale Siteche" (1964) for famous song "Ramya Hi Swargahun lanka", in Kannada movie Sandhya Raga (1966) where he has sung extensively. It includes a song "e pariya sobagu" rendered in both Hindustani and Carnatic (Karnataka shastriya sangeetha) styles along with M. Balamuralikrishna. He sang Birbal My Brother (1973) with Pandit Jasraj. He also sang for the Bengali film Tansen (1958) and Bollywood Movie Ankahee (1985) which later fetched him National Film Award for Best Male Playback Singer for the song Thumak Thumak Pag. His song 'Bhagyadalakshmi baaramma', a Purandara Dasa composition, was used by Anant Nag and Shankar Nag in the Kannada film Nodi Swami Naavu Irodhu Heege. He also sang as a playback singer for the Marathi film Gulacha Ganapati, produced and directed by P. L. Deshpande.

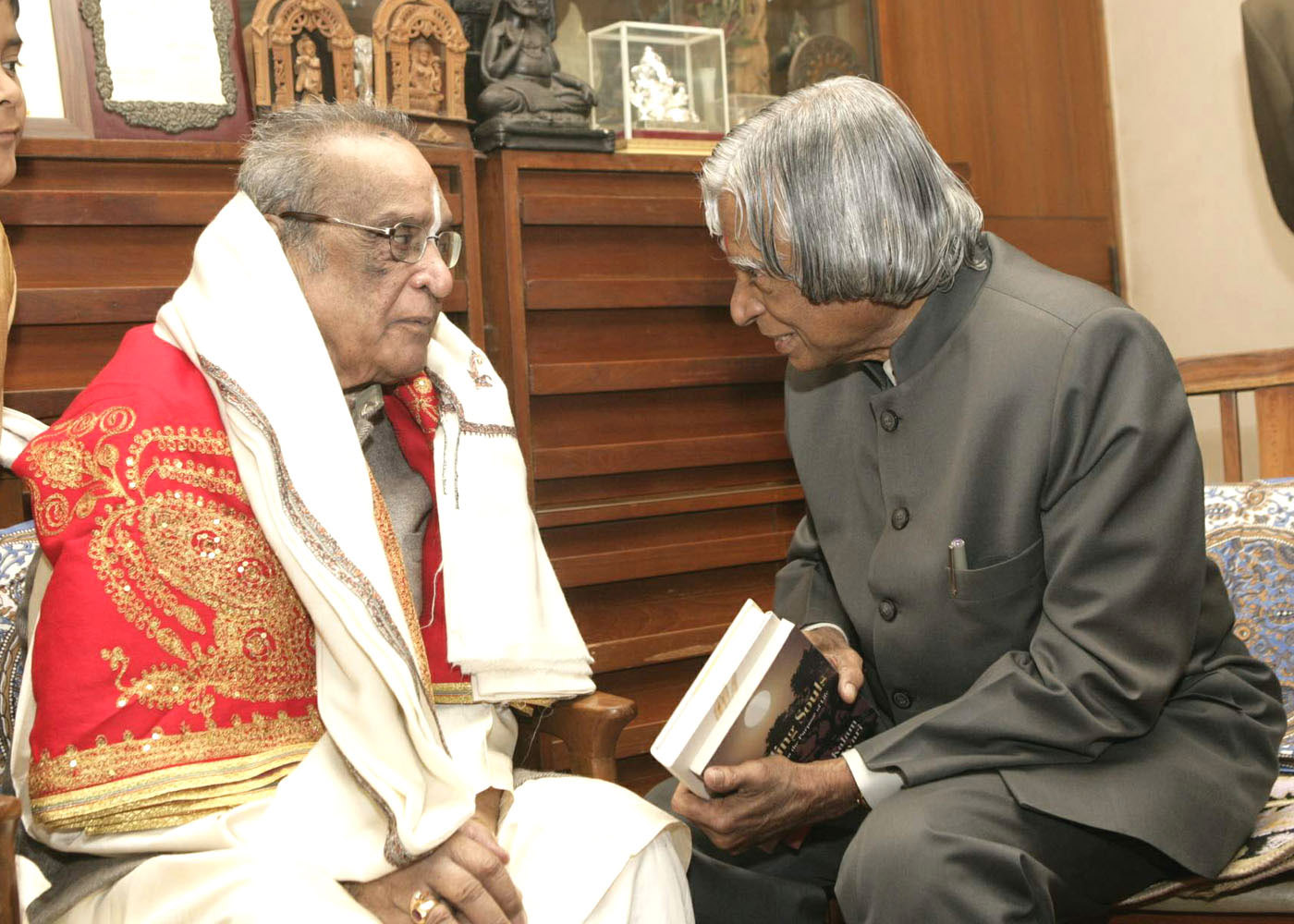
Then President of India A. P. J. Abdul Kalam meeting Joshi in 2007

=== Sawai Gandharva Music Festival ===
Joshi and his friend Nanasaheb Deshpande organised the Sawai Gandharva Music Festival as a homage to his guru, Sawai Gandharva, along with the Arya Sangeet Prasarak Mandal in 1953, marking Gandharva's first death anniversary. The festival has been held ever since, typically on the second weekend of December in Pune, Maharashtra also in kundagol Dharwad district and has become not only a cultural event for the city, but an annual pilgrimage for Hindustani Classical music lovers all over the world. Joshi conducted the festival annually since 1953, until his retirement in 2002.

== Legacy ==
Bhimsen Joshi toured several countries between 1964 and 1982, such as Afghanistan, Italy, France, Canada, and the United States, significantly contributing to the global reach of Hindustani classical music. His distinct performance style was marked by frequent reinterpretations of the same compositions, ensuring that each rendition was unique.

Bhimsen Joshi's partnership with the famous Carnatic artist M. Balamuralikrishna stands out. Their jugalbandi showcased a unique blend of Hindustani and Carnatic music, successfully maintaining the essence of both styles while innovating something original. Bhimsen Joshi continued to perform into his later years, with his final major concert occurring in 2004, where he once again shared the stage with Balamuralikrishna.

Bhimsen Joshi’s final performance at the Sawai Gandharva Music Festival in 2007 marked an important chapter in his career, where he both performed and played a key role in enriching the festival's history. In December 2010, shortly before his death, he made a brief appearance at the festival’s 58th edition. Although he did not perform, the audience gave him a standing ovation, reflecting the lasting impact of his work and legacy.

Joshi used an approach that sought a balance between traditional values and mass-culture tastes. This resulted in a commercially recorded repertoire in Hindustani vocal music. His status in music resulted in a generation of listeners who adopted his style through listening rather than formal tutelage. He established the Sawai Gandharva Festival held at Pune annually since 1953, which promotes a specific music culture.

Madhav Gudi, Prof Baldev Singh Bali, Narayan Deshpande, Shrikant Deshpande, Shrinivas Joshi, Anand Bhate and others are some of his more well-known disciples.

Since 2012 Pandit Bhimsen Joshi Lifetime Achievement Award is given by the Government of Maharashtra to artist who has been doing outstanding work in the field of classical singing and playing for a long time.

In September 2014, a postage stamp featuring Joshi was released by India Post commemorating his contributions to Hindustani music.

== Personal life ==
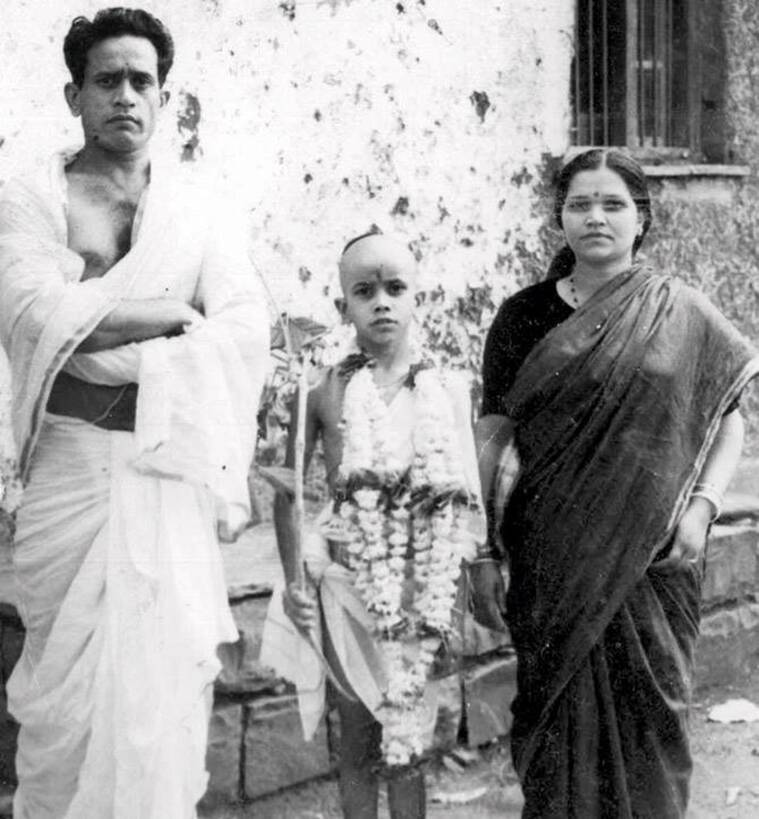
Bhimsen Joshi with his first wife Sunanda Katti at his eldest son Raghavendra Joshi, 1954.

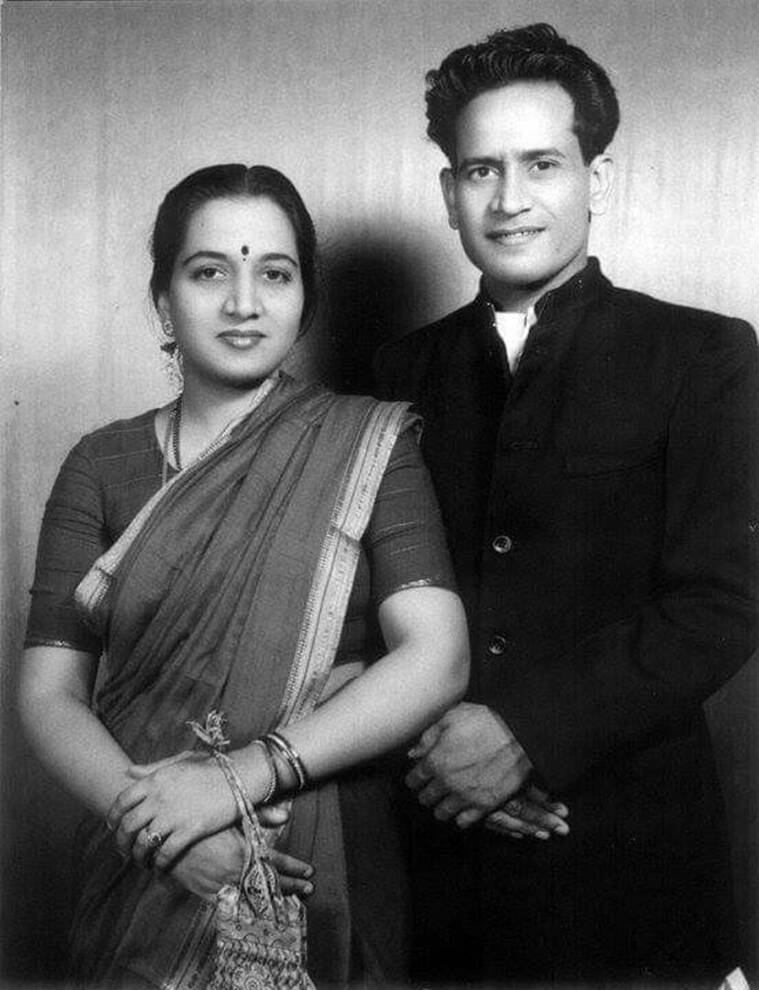
Bhimsen Joshi with his second wife Vatsala Mudholkar in 1951.

Joshi married twice. His first wife was Sunanda Katti, the daughter of his maternal uncle, whom he married in 1944. He had four children from Sunanda; Raghavendra, Usha, Sumangala, and Anand. In 1951, he married Vatsala Mudholkar, his co-actor in the Kannada play Bhagya-Shree. Bigamous marriages among Hindus were prohibited by law in the Bombay Presidency; so he took up residency in Nagpur (capital of Central Province and Berar in 1951) where bigamy was allowed and married there for the second time. He did not divorce or separate from Sunanda. With Vatsala, he had three children; Jayant, Shubhada, and Shrinivas Joshi. Initially, both his wives and families lived together, but when this did not work out, his first wife moved out with the family to live in a house in Limayewadi in Sadashiv Peth, Pune, where Joshi continued to visit them.

Joshi struggled with alcoholism, which he overcame by the late 1970s.

Outside of music, Joshi was passionate about cars and had a deep knowledge of auto mechanics.

== Death ==
Joshi was admitted to Sahyadri Super Speciality Hospital on 31 December 2010 with gastrointestinal bleeding and bilateral pneumonia. Due to difficulty in breathing, he was put on ventilator support. He suffered convulsions and was put on dialysis too during his stay in hospital. Though he recovered briefly for three days when he was taken off the ventilator, his condition deteriorated thereafter. He died on 24 January 2011. He was cremated at Vaikunth Crematorium in Pune with full state honours.

== Discography ==
Album	Year	Type
Pt. Bhimsen Joshi (Miyan Malhar + Puriya Kalyan)	1960	LP
Raga Lalit / Raga Shudh-Kalyan	1961	LP
Pt. Bhimsen Joshi Sings Raga Malkauns / Marubihag	1962	LP
Miya Ki Todi / Puriya Dhanashri / M. Gara Thumri	1963	LP
Ragas Yaman-Kalyan, Multani	1967	LP
Chhaya / Chhaya-Malhar / Darbari / Suha-Kanada	1968	LP
Raga Komal Rishabh Asawari/ Raga Marwa	1968	LP
Raga Lalit-Bhatiyar / Raga Kalashree	1971	LP
Raga Pooriya / Raga Durga	1973	LP
Raga Brindavani Sarang / Raga Gaud Sarang	1973	LP
Enchanting Melodies (6 melodies from 45 rpm releases)	1974	LP
Raga Soor Malhar / Raga Shuddha Kedar	1980s	LP

== Awards and recognitions ==
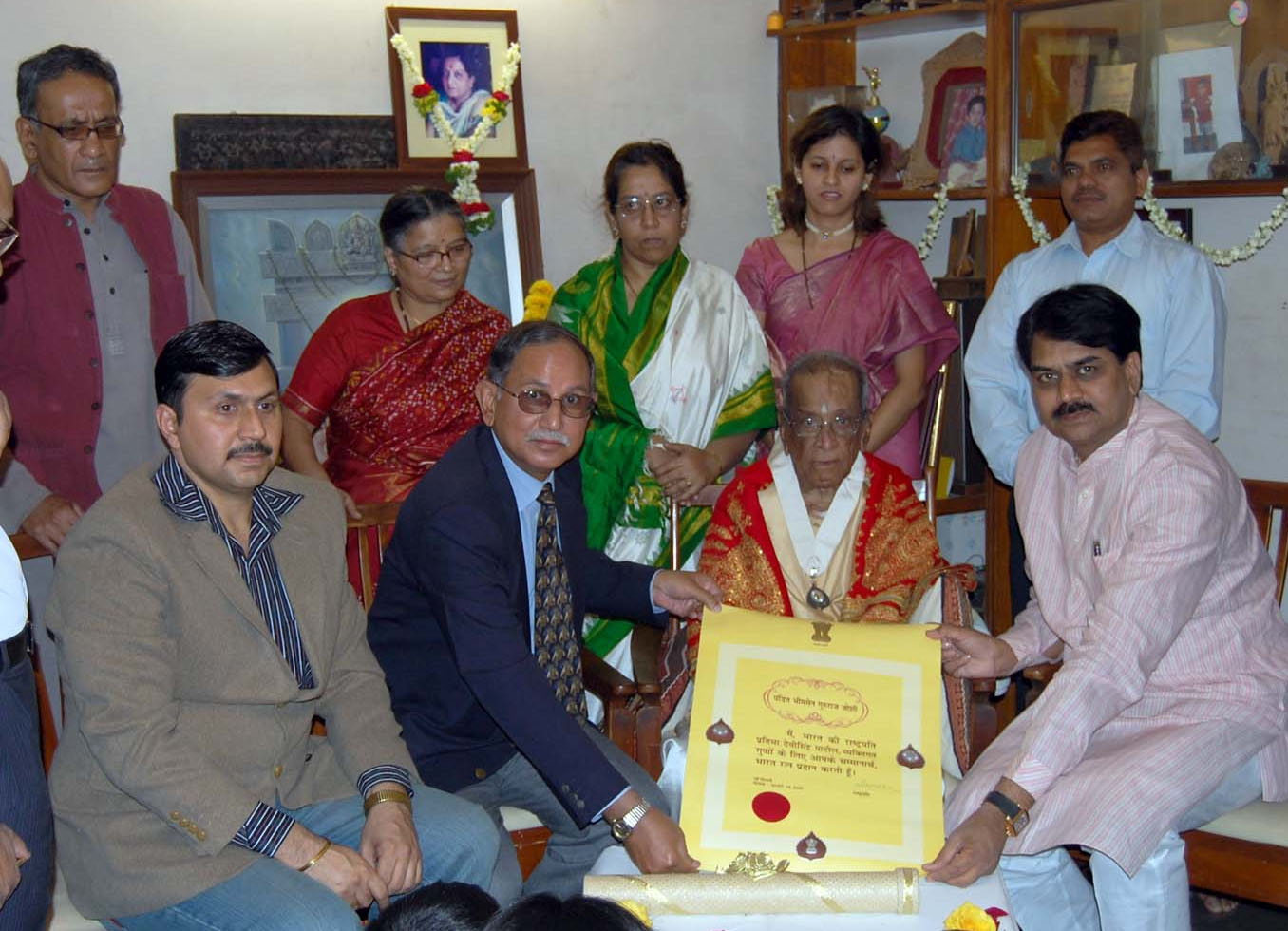
Joshi being conferred Bharat Ratna, India's highest civilian award, at his residence in 2009

- 1972 – Padma Shri
- 1976 – Sangeet Natak Akademi Award
- 1985 – Padma Bhushan
- 1985 – National Film Award for Best Male Playback Singer
- 1986 – "First platinum disc"
- 1998 – Sangeet Natak Akademi Fellowship
- 1999 – Padma Vibhushan
- 2000 – "Aditya Vikram Birla Kalashikhar Puraskar"
- 2002 – Maharashtra Bhushan
- 2003 – "Swathi Sangeetha Puraskaram" by Government of Kerala
- 2005 – Karnataka Ratna
- 2008 – "Swami Haridas Award"
- 2009 – Bharat Ratna
- 2009 – "Lifetime achievement award" by Delhi government
- 2010 – "S V Narayanaswamy Rao National Award" by Rama Seva Mandali, Bangalore
- 2017 – Bharatratna Pandit Bhimsen Joshi Hospital By Mira Bhayander Municipal Corporation, Bhayander West
- 2024 - Sur Jyotsna National Music Award Aadranjali Purskar
