= Abdul Karim Khan =

Indian Hindustani classical music vocalist (1872 - 1937)

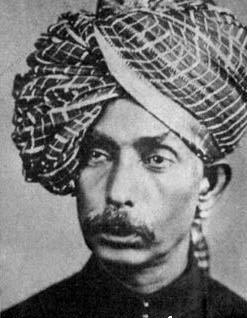

Background information
- Born: 11 November 1872
- Origin: Kairana, Uttar Pradesh
- Died: 27 October 1937 (aged 64)
- Genre: Indian classical music
- Occupation: Singer of hindustani classical music
- Years active: 1893–1937
- Label: Awards:
- Abdul Karim Khan's singing a bandish in Raag Jhinjhoti Bandish in Raag Jhinjhoti – "Piya bin nahi aawat chain, kaa se kahoon jee ke bain"

Ustad Abdul Karim Khan (Devanagari: उस्ताद अब्दुल करीम ख़ान, Persian: اُستاد عبدُالکریم خان) (11 November 1872 – 27 October 1937) was an Indian classical singer and, along with his cousin Abdul Wahid Khan, the founder of the Kirana gharana of classical music.

== Early life and background ==
Abdul Karim Khan was born on 11 November 1872 in Kirana town in Shamli, Uttar Pradesh into a family with music tradition which traced its roots to musician brothers Ghulam Ali and Ghulam Maula. His father, Kale Khan, was the grandson of Ghulam Ali. Abdul Karim Khan received training from his uncle Abdullah Khan and father Kale Khan. He also received guidance from another uncle, Nanhe Khan. Abdul Karim Khan was musically influenced by Ustad Rahmat Khan of Gwalior gharana. Apart from vocals and sarangi, he also learned the veena (been), sitar and tabla.

According to a story, he was initially a sarangi player, but decided to switch to vocals because of low status of sarangi players at that time. In his early years, he used to sing with his brother Abdul Haq. They appeared before Murtaza Khan of the "Maula Bakhsh Khandan", then all appeared before the Maharaja (king). They were all influenced by Murtaza's style. The king of Baroda State was impressed by this singing duo and made them the court musicians.

This is where he met Tarabai Mane, who was the daughter of Sardar Maruti Rao Mane, a member of the royal family. When they decided to get married, they were ousted from Baroda. The couple settled in Bombay. In 1922, Tarabai Mane left Abdul Karim Khan, which apparently had a major impact on his music – making it pensive and meditative.

Karim Khan's first wife, Ghafooran, was the sister of another Kirana master Abdul Wahid Khan, who was also his cousin.

== Career ==
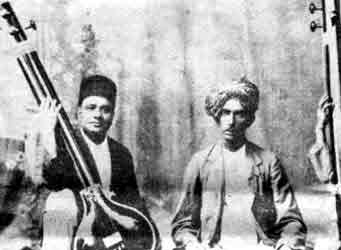
Abdul Karim and disciple Sawai Gandharva

"One of the most melodious classical musicians we have had, Abdul Karim Khan's music always created a sublime atmosphere. The soothing quality of his specially cultivated voice, and his repose style of singing were such that the singer as well as his listeners forgot themselves in a sort of 'trance'."

Abdul Karim Khan was invited to the Mysore court where he met famous Carnatic music masters who also influenced his music. In particular the singing of his sargam was a direct influence of Carnatic practice. He became a frequent visitor to Mysore Palace which conferred on him the title Sangeet Ratna. On the way to Mysore, he used to stay with his brother in Dharwad where he taught his most famous disciple Sawai Gandharva. In 1900, for eight months he taught Kesarbai Kerkar, who would go on to be one of the 20th century's most renowned vocalists. In 1913, he founded the Arya Sangeet Vidyalaya in Poona to teach music to the students. He finally settled down in Miraj till his death on 27 October 1937, when returning from a concert tour of the South. Every year in August, commemorative music concerts are held in Miraj in his honour.

== His style ==
The innovations he brought to his vocal style distinguishes Kirana style from others. The slow melodic development of the raga in Vilambit laya (slow tempo) was the most characteristic aspect of his music. He worked hard to maintain his voice to be sweet and melodious which shaped his music. The thumri style he developed is also quite different from the 'Poorab ang' or 'Punjabi ang'. His thumri progresses in a leisurely slow pace with ample abandonment. He was also the first Hindustani musician to seriously study the Carnatic system and probably the first to be invited to sing all over the South. He has even recorded a Thyagaraja Krithi. He was also influenced by Rehmat Khan of the Gwalior gharana and adopted the direct style of presentation. "The ustad was an expert on many musical instruments, especially the veena and the sarangi. An expert in repairing musical instruments, he carried with him his set of tools for repairs everywhere..."

"Although frail-looking, Khan Saheb maintained excellent health through regular exercises, disciplined habits, and frugal living. His photographs show him as a tall, slim person dressed immaculately in a black 'achkan', a cane in hand, a typical moustache and a red gold-bordered turban, and most striking of all, his dreamy eyes."

== Disciples ==
Abdul Karim's disciples include Pandit Balkrishnabuwa Kapileshwari, Ganapat Rao Gurav, Roshan Ara Begum, Sureshbabu Mane, Vishwanathbuwa Jadhav and Sawai Gandharva who was the Guru of Bhimsen Joshi.

== Death ==
He was on his way to Pondicherry when he experienced severe pain in the chest at Chingleput. On 27 October 1937, he died peacefully on the platform at Singaperumalkoil railway station. He spent the last few hours of his life remembering God, offering Namaz and reciting Kalma in the Raga Darbari.
