= Kadalekai Parishe =

Annual groundnut fair in Bangalore

Kadalekai Parishe ಕಡಲೆಕಾಯಿ ಪರಿಷೆ
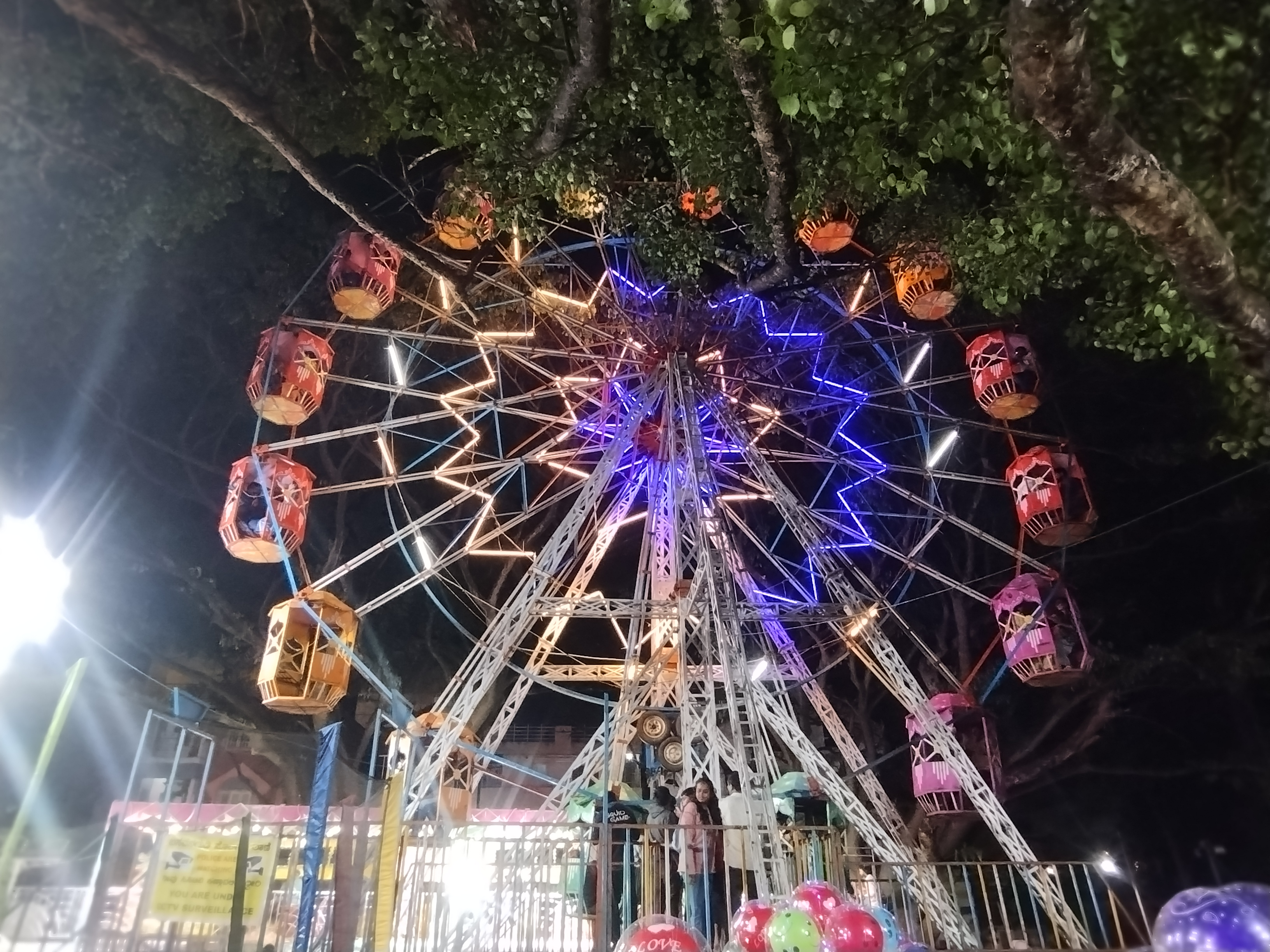
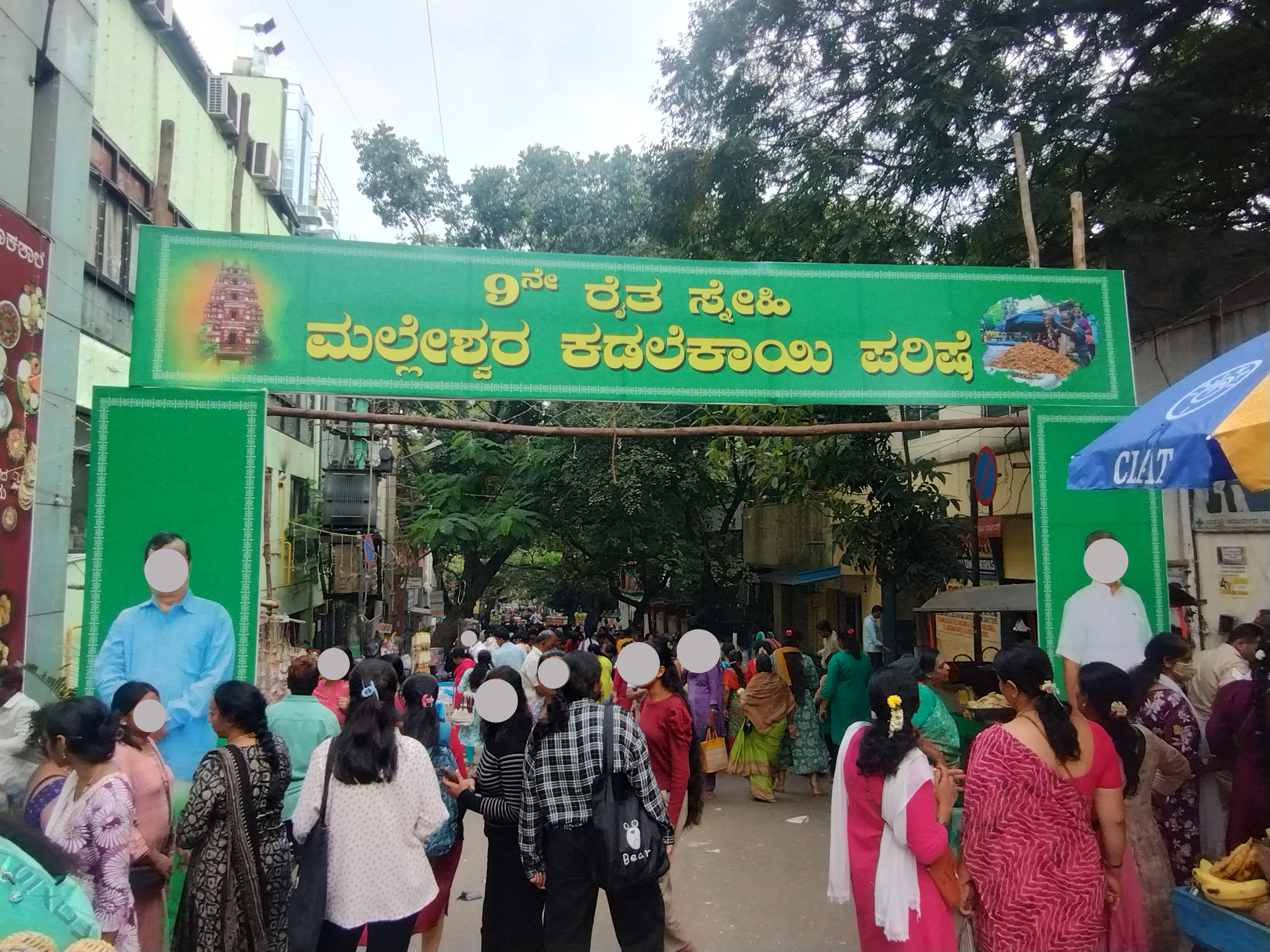
- Basavanagudi Kadalekai Parishe 2025 (top); 9th Malleshwaram Kadalekai Parishe 2025 (bottom)
- Status: active
- Genre: Annual festival
- Venue: Basavanagudi and Malleshwaram of Bangalore
- Location: Bangalore
- Coordinates: 12.942058249082486°N 77.56810371691687°E Basavanagudi
- Country: India
- Years active: From 2017

Kadalekai Parishe (Kannada: ಕಡಲೆಕಾಯಿ ಪರಿಷೆ), is an annual groundnut fair which takes place in Basavanagudi and Malleshwaram of Bangalore. This is a two to three-day fair. Farmers from other parts of the state bring their first crop of groundnuts to offer to Basavanna. Also, there will be numerous stalls of Groundnuts, with all different varieties such as, freshly plucked groundnuts, fried groundnuts, with shell, unshelled, boiled groundnuts and many. Apart from the Groundnuts, there are numerous stalls in the fair, selling Bangles, Bags, traditional toys and clay trinkets, plastic and glass dolls, Mehndi tattoos. There are a variety of food items, such as Bajji, Bonda, Batthaas (Coloured sugar candies), Kalyana seve or Bendu (Sugar coated gram) and Coloured sodas on sale during the fair. Over 200 groundnut vendors were benefited and the total plastic consumption at the fair came down by over 60%.

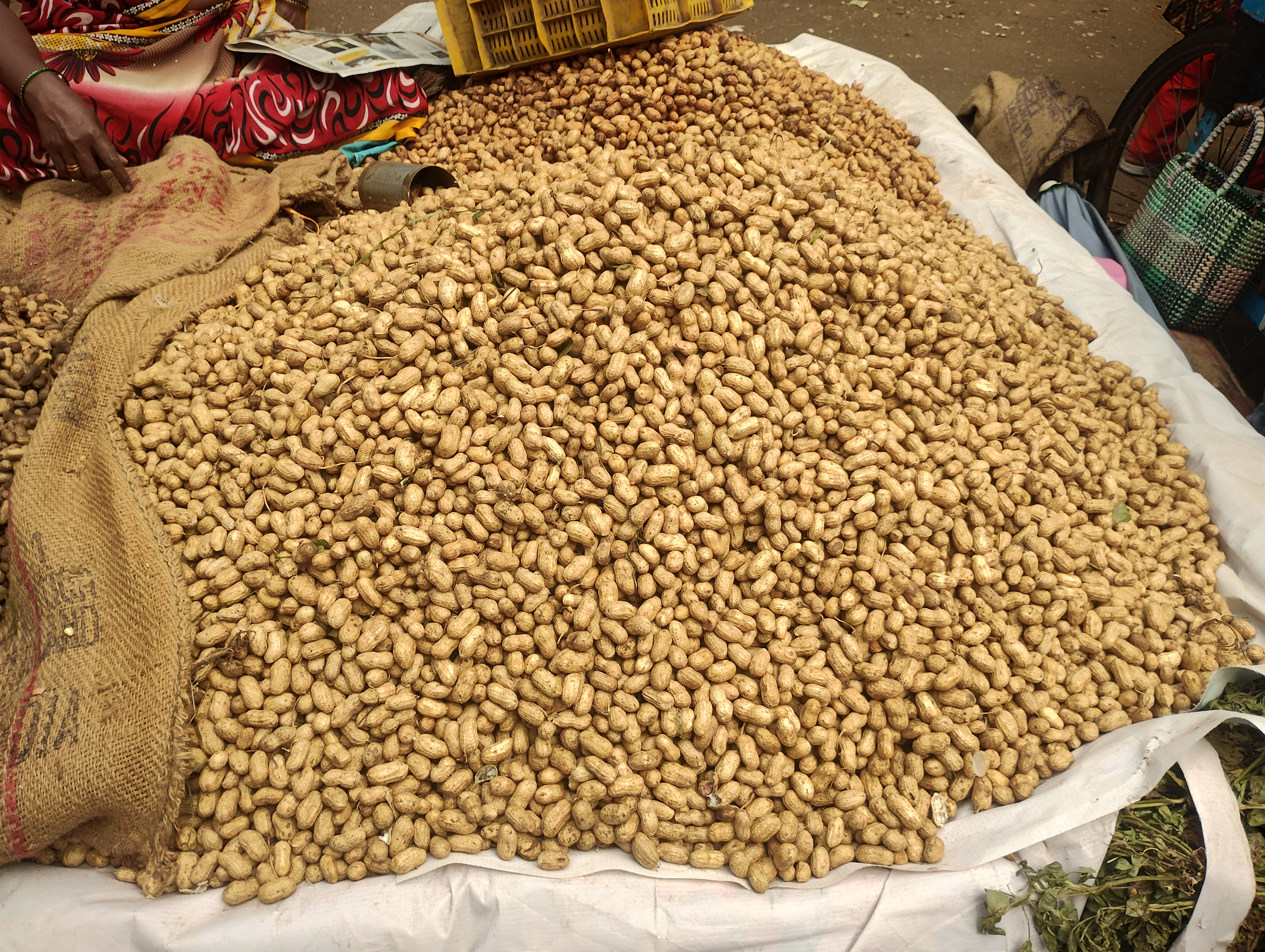
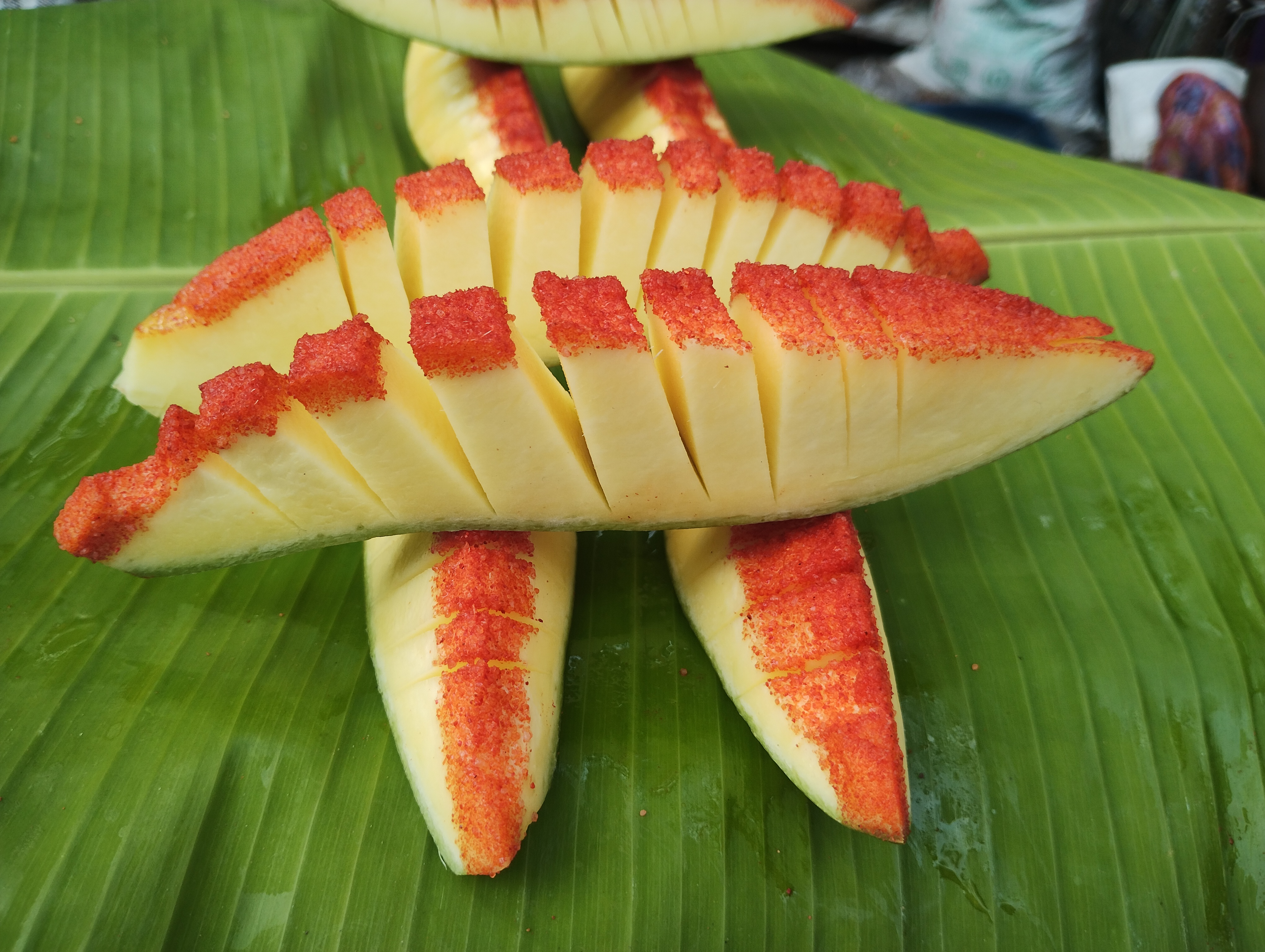
Various type of groundnuts and other edibles are exhibited and sold in the festival

== Etymology ==
Kadalekai Parishe, is a Kannada word, which literally translates to Groundnut fair.

== History ==
A few hundred years ago, there was a small village called Basavanagudi in Bengaluru in Karnataka. Farmers in Basavanagudi and surrounding villages like Sunkenahalli, Gavipuram Guttahalli, Mavalli, Dasarahalli cultivated groundnuts. These farmers had a problem. On every full moon day, a bull used to charge into the groundnut fields and damage the crop. They used to incur a heavy loss because of this. So, one night they waited for the bull to come and when it did, they started to chase it. The bull ran very fast over a hillock. The villagers followed. But once they reached on top, it disappeared. Instead of the bull, they saw an idol of Nandi there. Nandi is also called Basava in Kannada. To the farmers’ utter surprise, the idol began to grow bigger and bigger. They nailed an iron peg on the head of the idol and stopped it from growing any further. Thinking the bull attack and finding the idol as divine co-incidence, they pledged to offer their first crop to Nandi. They built a temple to Nandi Basava which is now famous as Basavanagudi or Bull temple. The Nandi idol stands 15 feet tall and 20 feet long. The day the farmers offer their first groundnut harvest of the year is celebrated as Kadalekai Parishe in the vicinity of Basavanagudi Bull temple. It is a two day long fair and farmers from far off villages come to offer their first crop to Nandi. Apart from Sellnggroundnuts, the fair also sells traditional dolls, toys, bangles, food items, and the farmers make a living from their crop.

== Legend ==
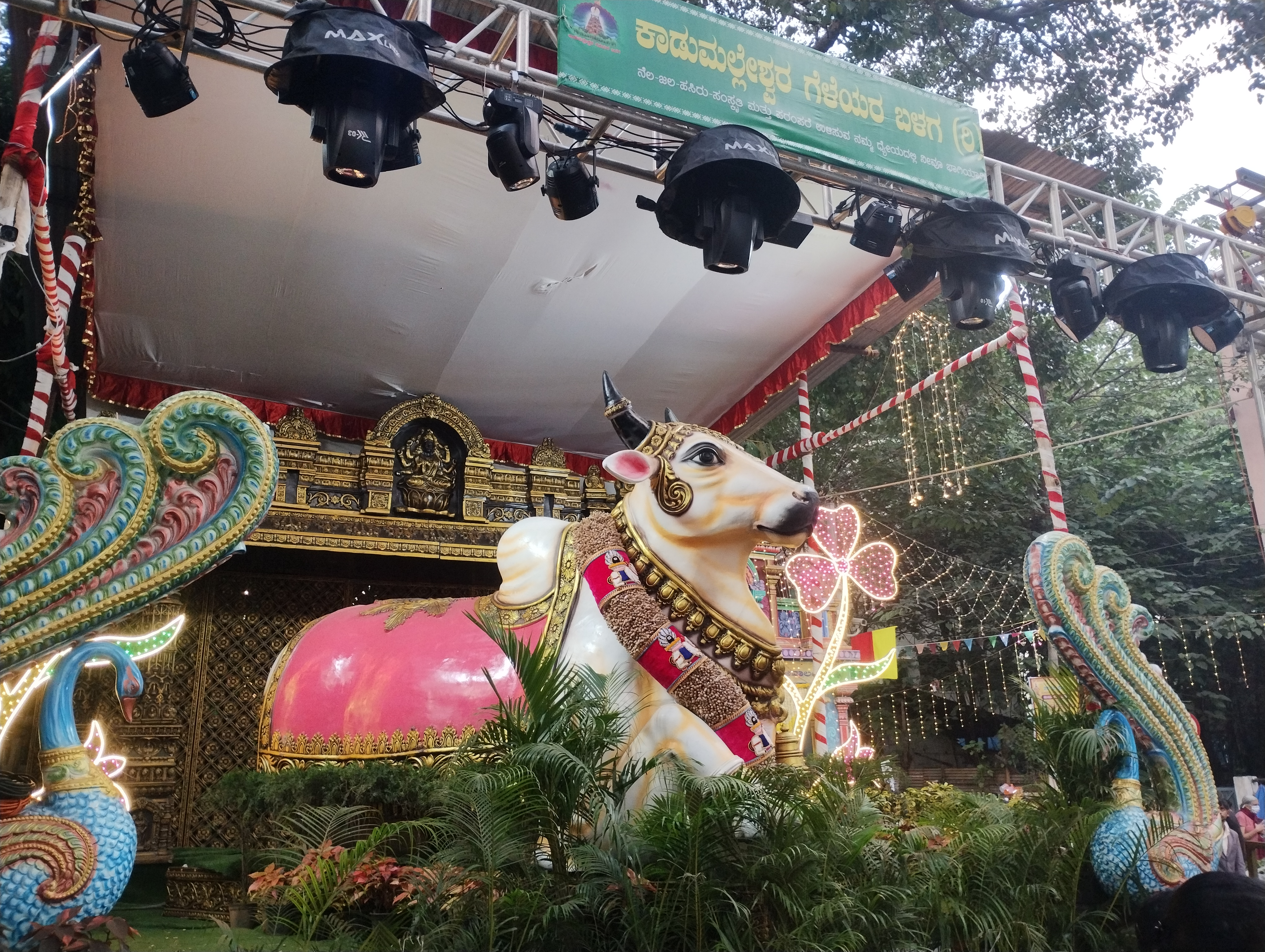
Sculpture of Basavanna, the sacred bull, decorated at 9th Malleshwaram Kadalekai Parishe (2025)

People say that the night on which this Kadalekai Parishe used to end, Lord Basavanna - The big Bull, used to come in the animal form and eat up all the groundnut and peels left overnight on the streets.

== Event dates ==
On every year, Kadalekai Parishe, the annual groundnut fair is held on the last Monday of Karthika Masa (month in Hindu calendar). There is few days difference between Karthika month followed in Karnataka and Tamil Nadu. This event dates are based on Karnataka version of Hindu Calendar.

Kadalekai Parishe 2025

| Year | From | To | Location | Ref(s) |
|---|---|---|---|---|
| 2025 | 8 November | 10 November | Malleshwaram | |
| 2025 | 17 November | 21 November | Basavanagudi | |

== Media gallery ==
=== 9th Malleshwaram Kadalekai Parishe (2025) ===
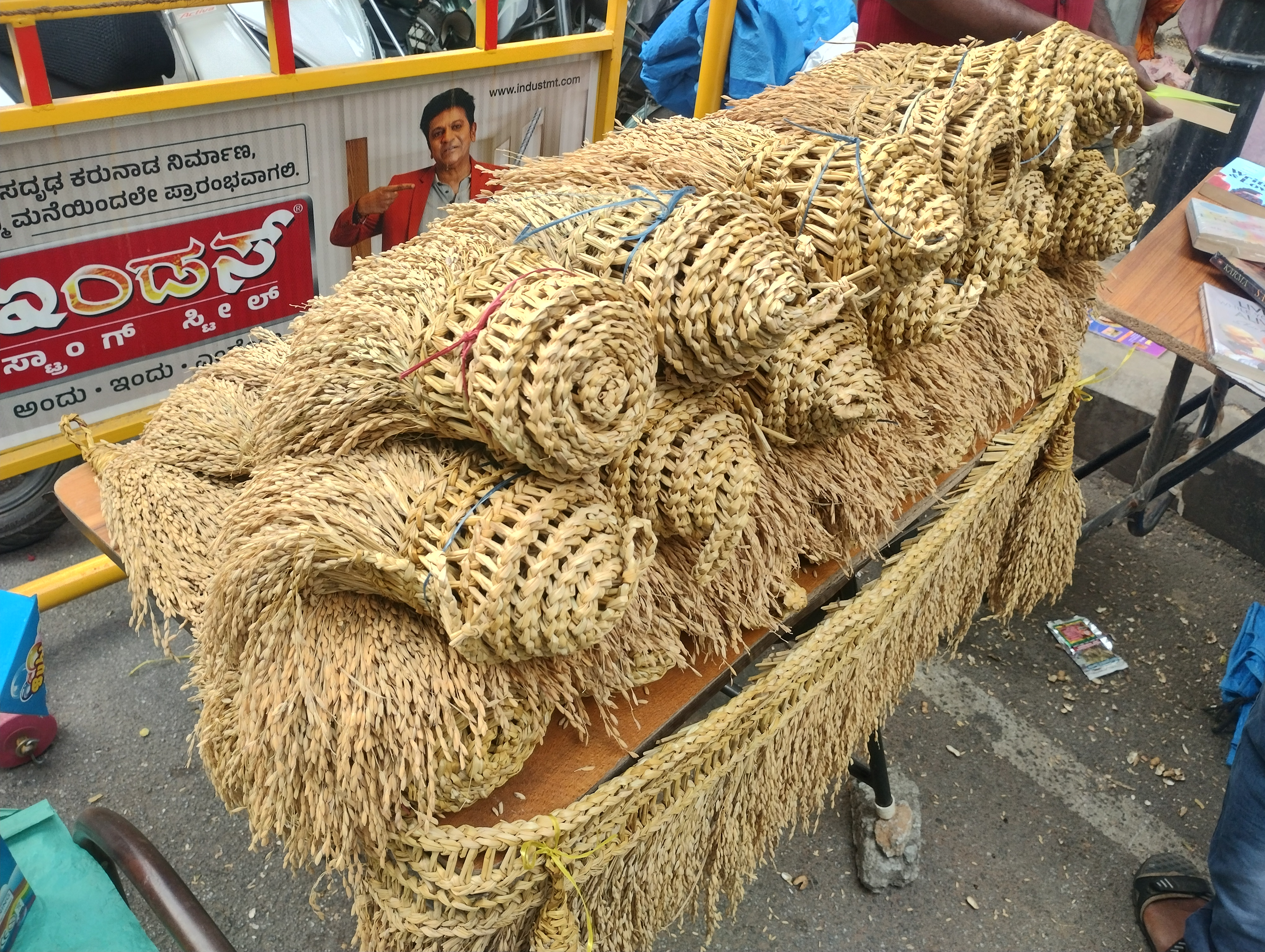
Crafts

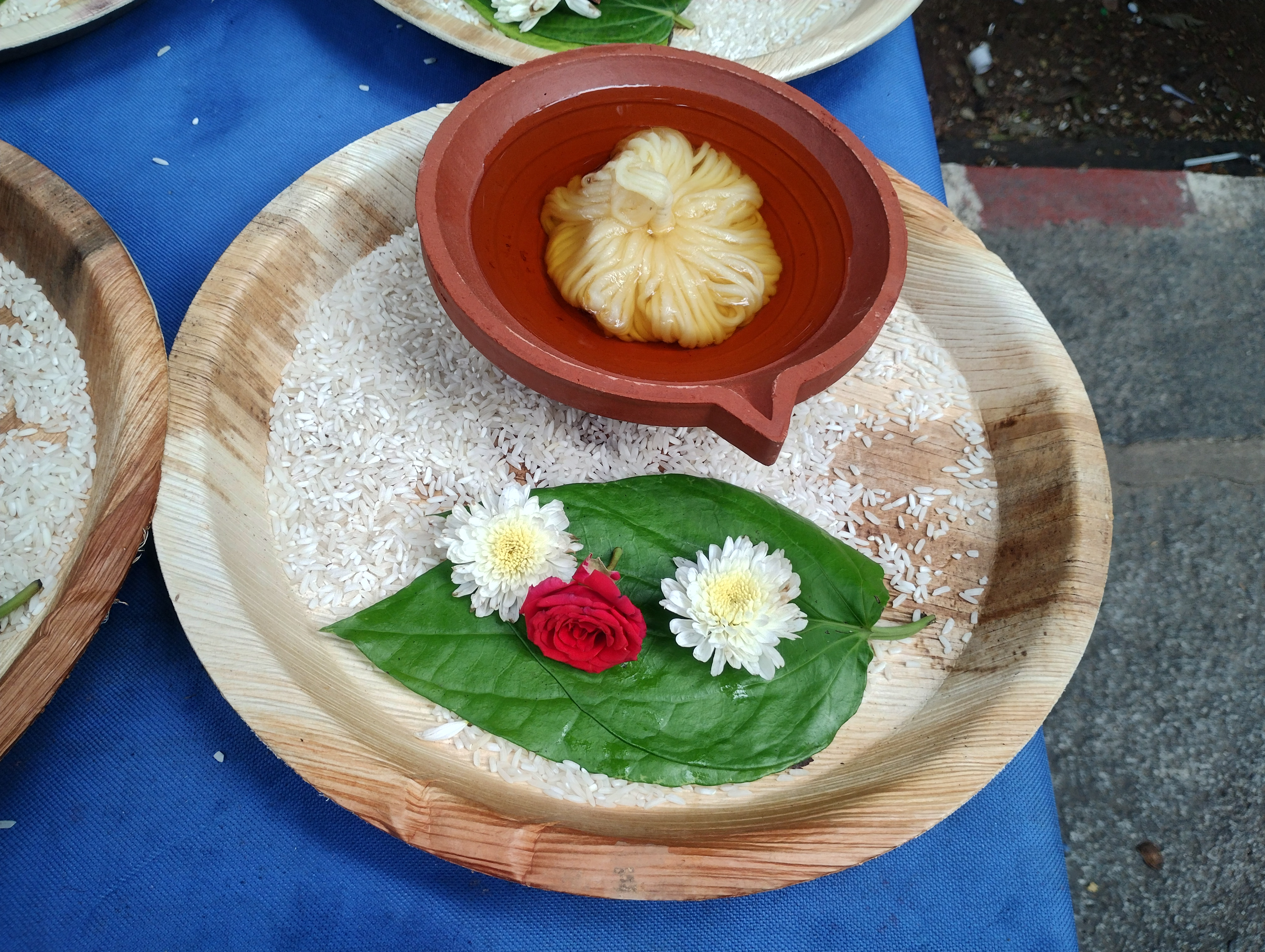
Offerings to temple gods as a part of divine rituals

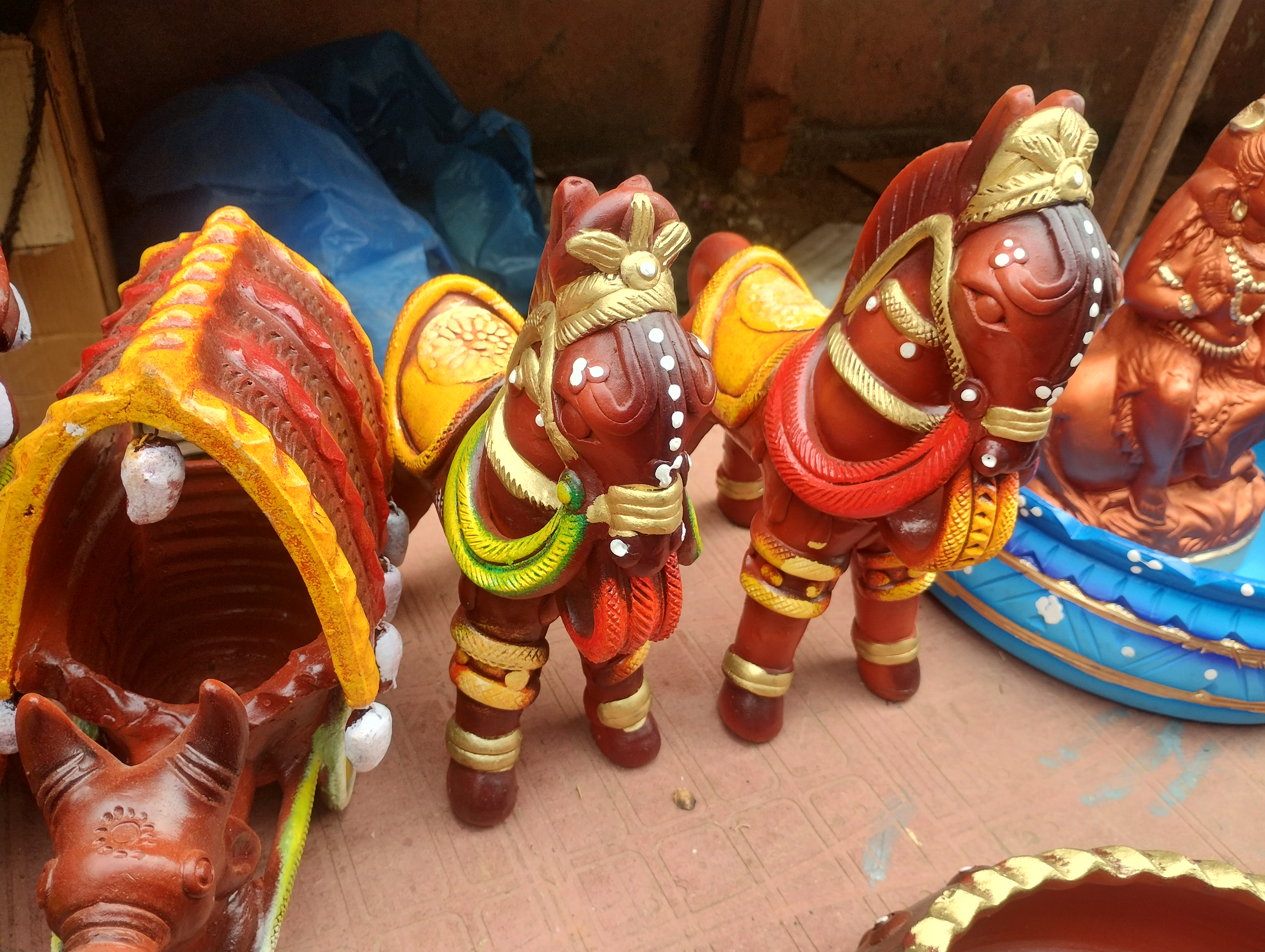
Art and crafts

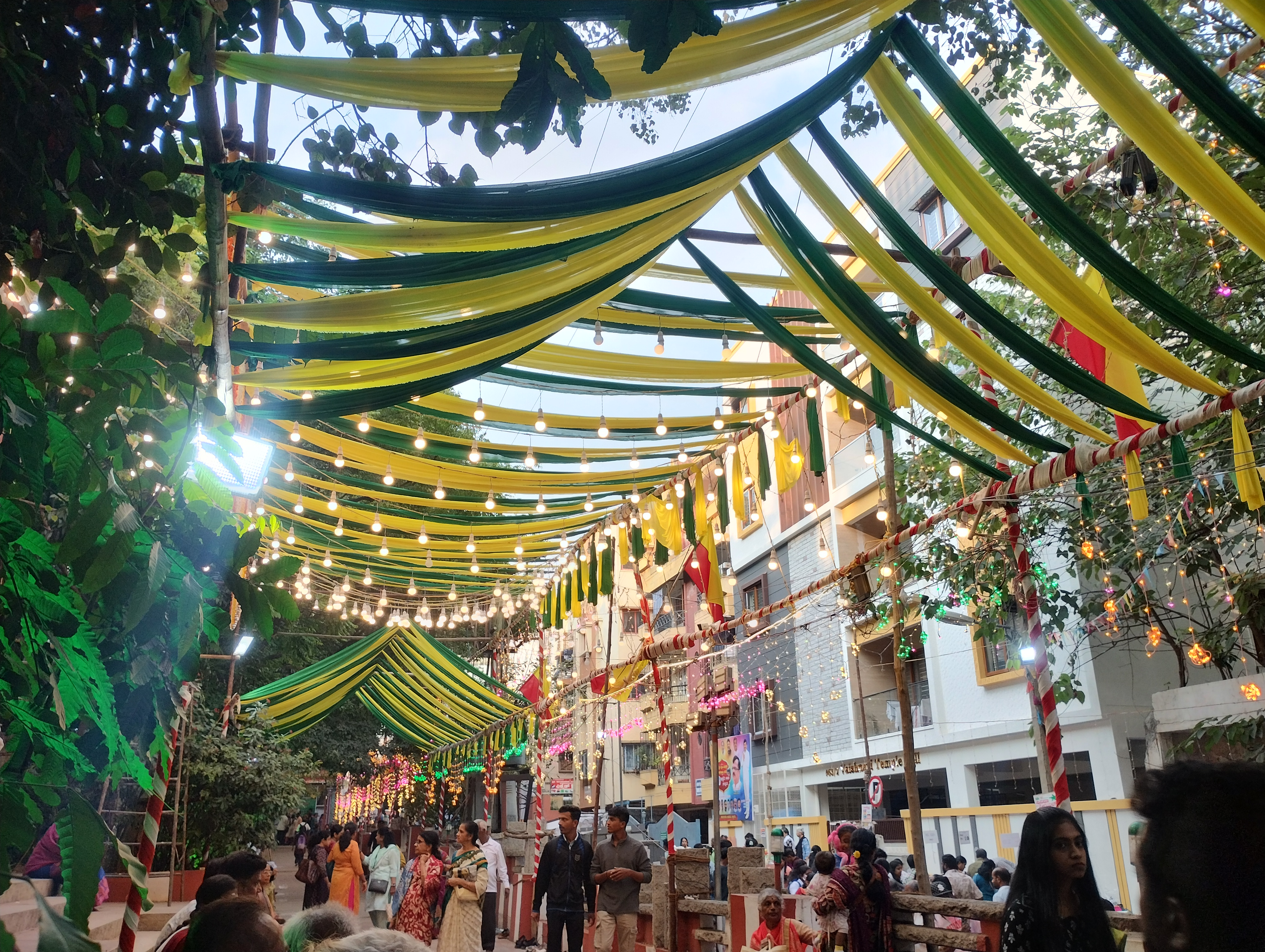
Temples decorated on the eve

=== Basavanagudi Kadalekai Parishe (2025) ===
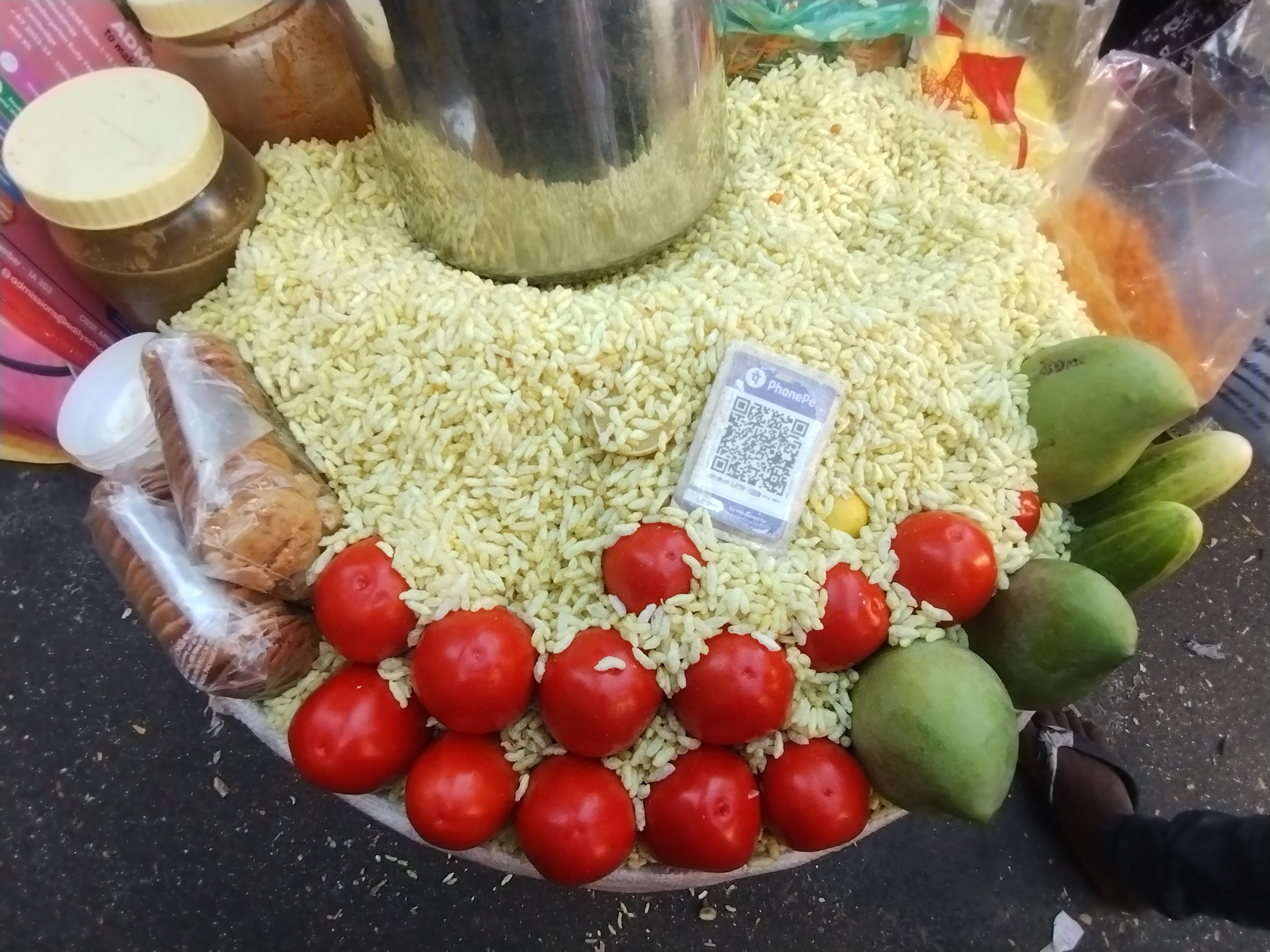
Puffed rice

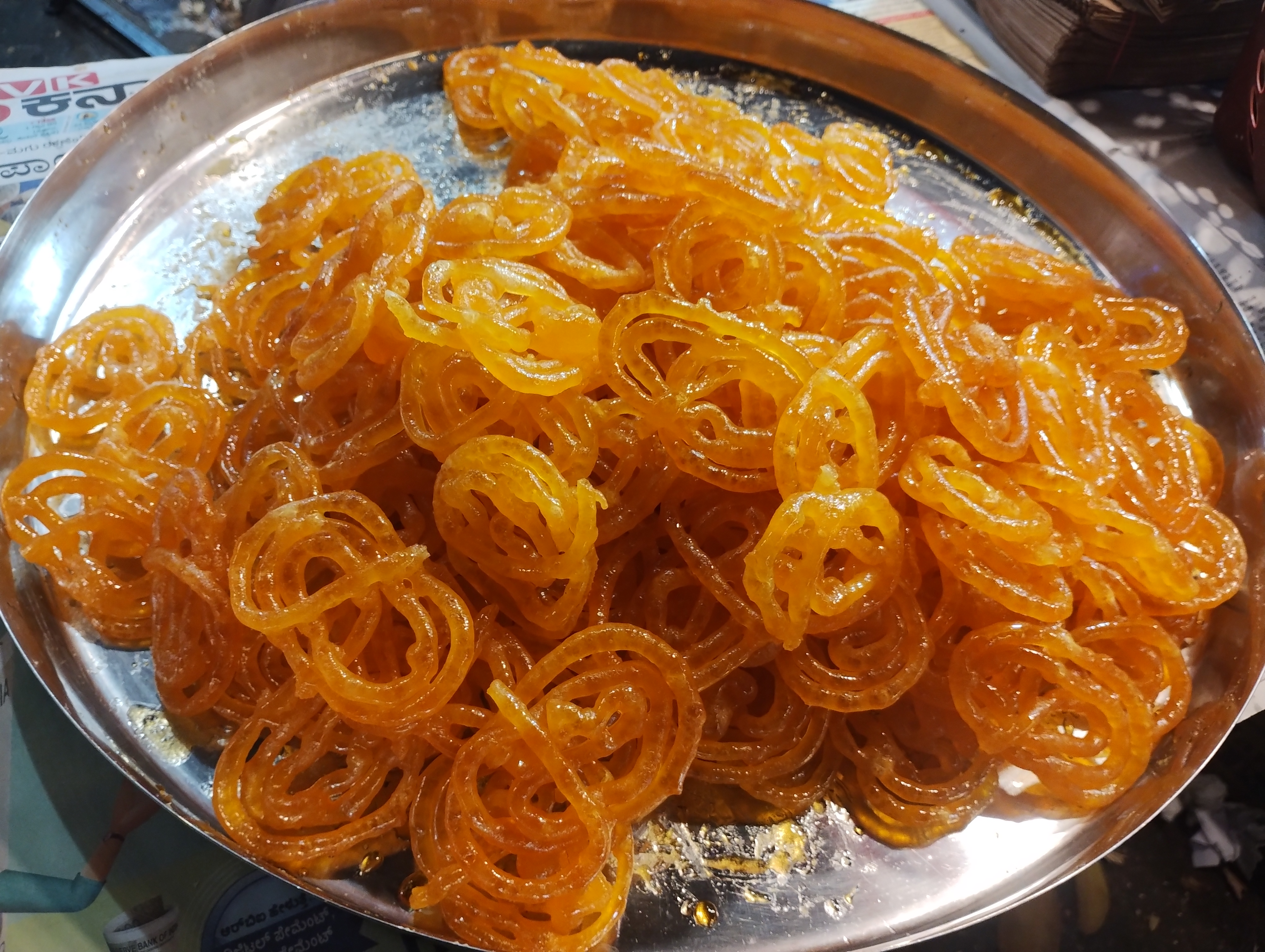
Jalebi

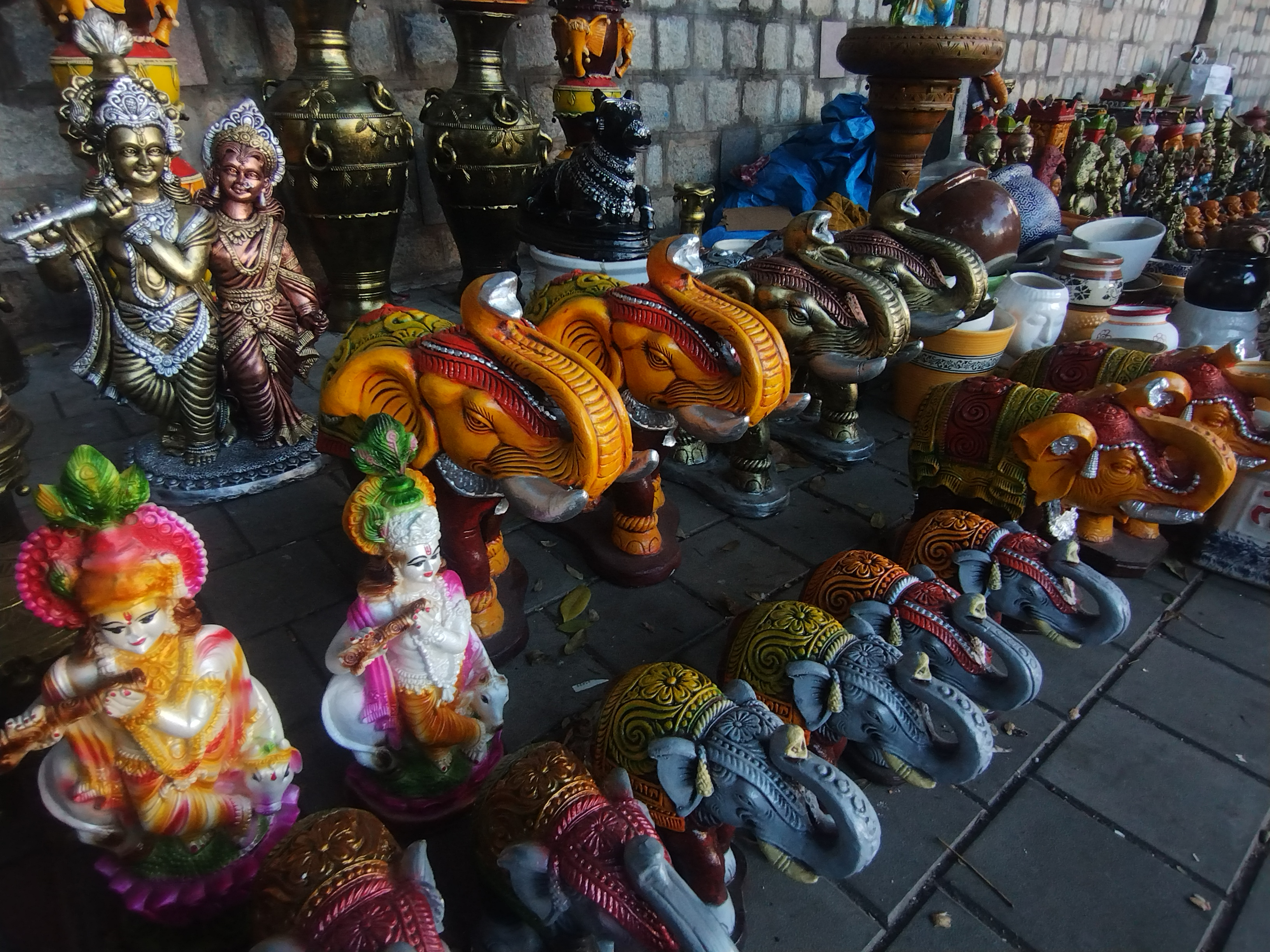
Crafts

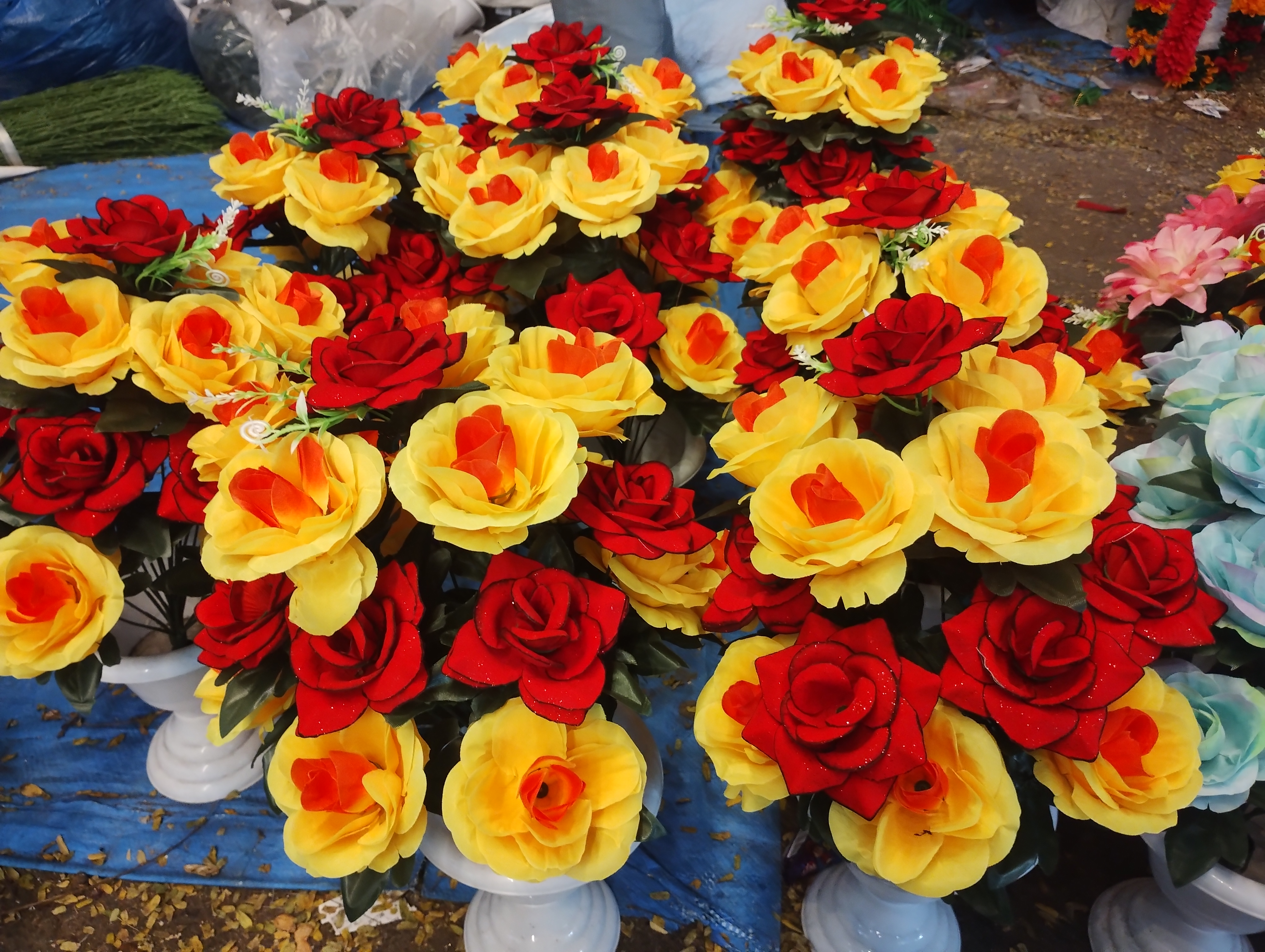
Artificial flowers

== See also ==
- Art and culture of Karnataka
- Rangoli Gardens, a model arts heritage village, located in Jakkur, Bangalore
