= Raza Foundation =

Delhi-based non-profit organisation dedicated to arts, culture and ideas

The Raza Foundation | रज़ा फ़ाउंडेशन
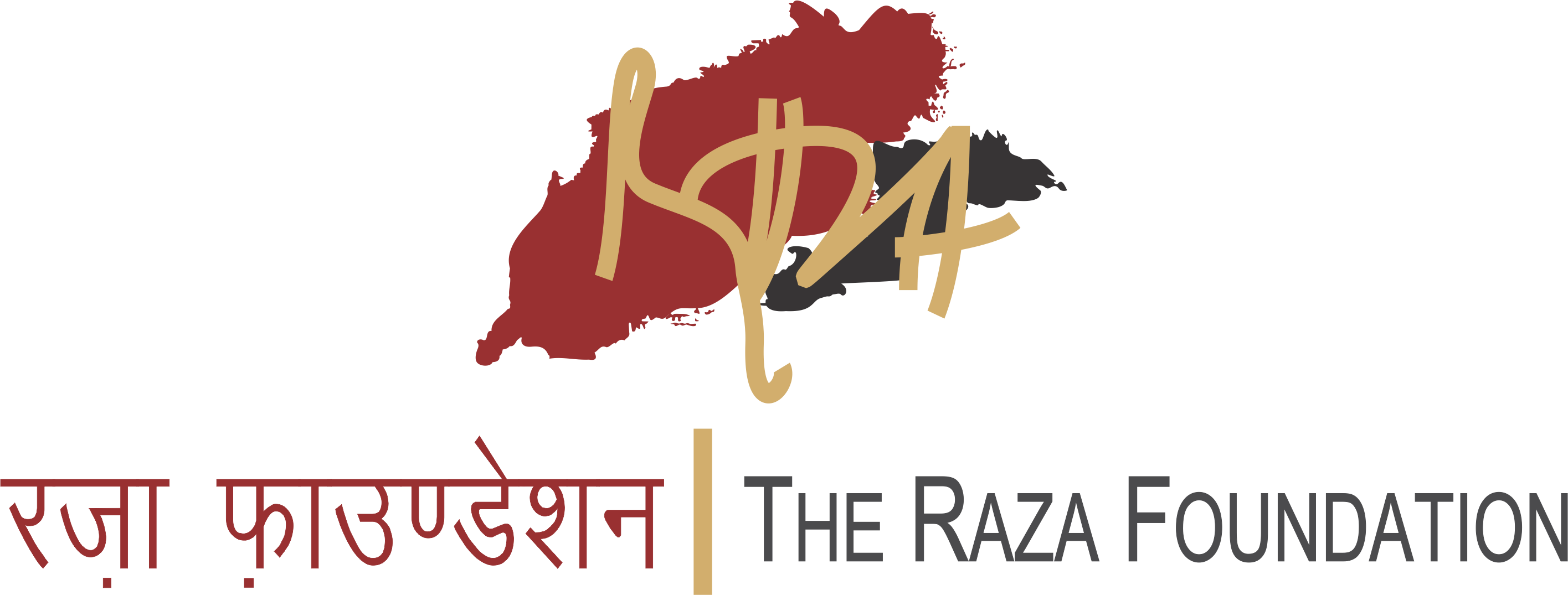
- Formation: 2001
- Founder: Sayed Haider Raza
- Headquarters: New Delhi
- Managing Trustee: Ashok Vajpeyi
- Website: https://www.therazafoundation.org/

Raza Foundation (Hindi: रज़ा फ़ाउंडेशन) is a Delhi-based non-profit organisation dedicated to arts, culture and ideas. It was established in 2001 by the Indian painter Sayed Haider Raza, the foundation creates venues for diverse artistic expressions by promoting conversations through presentations, panel discussions, concerts, and theatre. It has been hosting events such as publications, seminars, lectures, concerts, recitals, and art exhibits, with a focus on the younger generation.

Since 2001, Ashok Vajpeyi has been serving as the managing trustee for the Raza Foundation.

== History ==
The Raza Foundation founded in 2001 by painter and artist Sayed Haider Raza. The foundation has intention of advancing the visual arts, music, and poetry, among other things. The foundation supports emerging talent in poetry, performing arts, and artistic arts.

The name of the foundation was dedicated to the SH Raza. In the beginning, Raza did not want his name to be used in the foundation. But Vajpeyi persuaded Raza to include his name in the foundation's title. With the foundation of this NGO, Arun Vadehra (of the Vadehra Art Gallery), and poet and critic Ashok Vajpeyi and Raza were the only three trustees.

The Raza Foundation has archived SH Raza's work and legacy. The cornerstone of his legacy is being adhered to by the foundation. The first is the tangible or creative element, encompassing Raza's residence, workplace, artwork, and literary works. Under Ashok Vajpeyi's direction, the foundation has worked hard enough to guarantee the preservation of each of these elements. And then there was his readiness to lend a hand to others. He forbade the Foundation from spending any money on him while he was still living. By awarding grants and providing assistance to up-and-coming artists and organisations that advance the arts across the nation, the foundation is continuing this tradition.

The Raza Foundation played a crucial role in organizing the retrospective exhibition of SH Raza at the Centre Pompidou in Paris. They worked for more than five years to pitch and organize the show, which is the largest-ever retrospective of the artist. The foundation was also pivotal in organizing a series of shows in India in 2022, the centenary year of Raza's birth, in three Indian private museums.

== Work and impact ==
The Raza Foundation under Vajpeyi guidance, has created an ecology of exploring, supporting and experiencing arts and legacy through seminars, concerts, exhibitions, fellowships, books, and journals. Additionally, it offers fellowships to young talent for rigorous study into masterworks and current cultural challenges. The Raza Foundation embraces Indian classical dance forms, music, literature, and modern art, and it organises several events in 20 locations every year.

Foundation organises regular exhibitions of Raza's paintings, as well as those of his friends and fellow artists. The foundation works with public organisations to increase the audience for literature, art, classical dance, and music. The organisation has published 200 Hindi books on Gandhianism, philosophy, the arts, culture, poetry, translations, and biographies as of Raza's centenary year in 2021.

=== Dhrupad Vaibhav ===
Dhrupad Vaibhav is a festival that celebrates the history and beauty of the Dhrupad musical form in Hindustani classical music. Derived from ancient chhand-prabandh gayan, Dhrupad offered a compositional structure to abstract raags. It gained prominence through musicians like Swami Haridas, Tansen, and Raja Mansingh Tomar in the 15th and 16th centuries. Despite a decline in popularity, Dhrupad remains an epitome of classicism. Institutions like the Dhrupad Kendra at Bharat Bhavan in Bhopal have revived its contemporary relevance. The Dhrupad Vaibhav festival, organized by the Raza Foundation, celebrates the unhurried and immersive style of Dhrupad. The recent third edition of the festival was held in Delhi in collaboration with the India International Centre and Naad-Chakra Trust of Pt. Nirmalya De. The festival features performances by renowned artists, including rudra veena recitals and renditions of rare ragas like Adbhut Kalyan.

=== Annual Memorial Lectures ===
Seven yearly memorial lectures honouring the following masters: Daya Krishna (philosophy), Kumar Gandharva (music), Kelucharan Mohapatra (dancing), Agyeya (poetry), Habib Tanvir (theatre), and V. S. Gaitonde (visual arts). Speakers from the performing arts, visual arts, literature, and other fields will be included in Art Dialogue, another series of panel discussions.

=== Art Matters ===
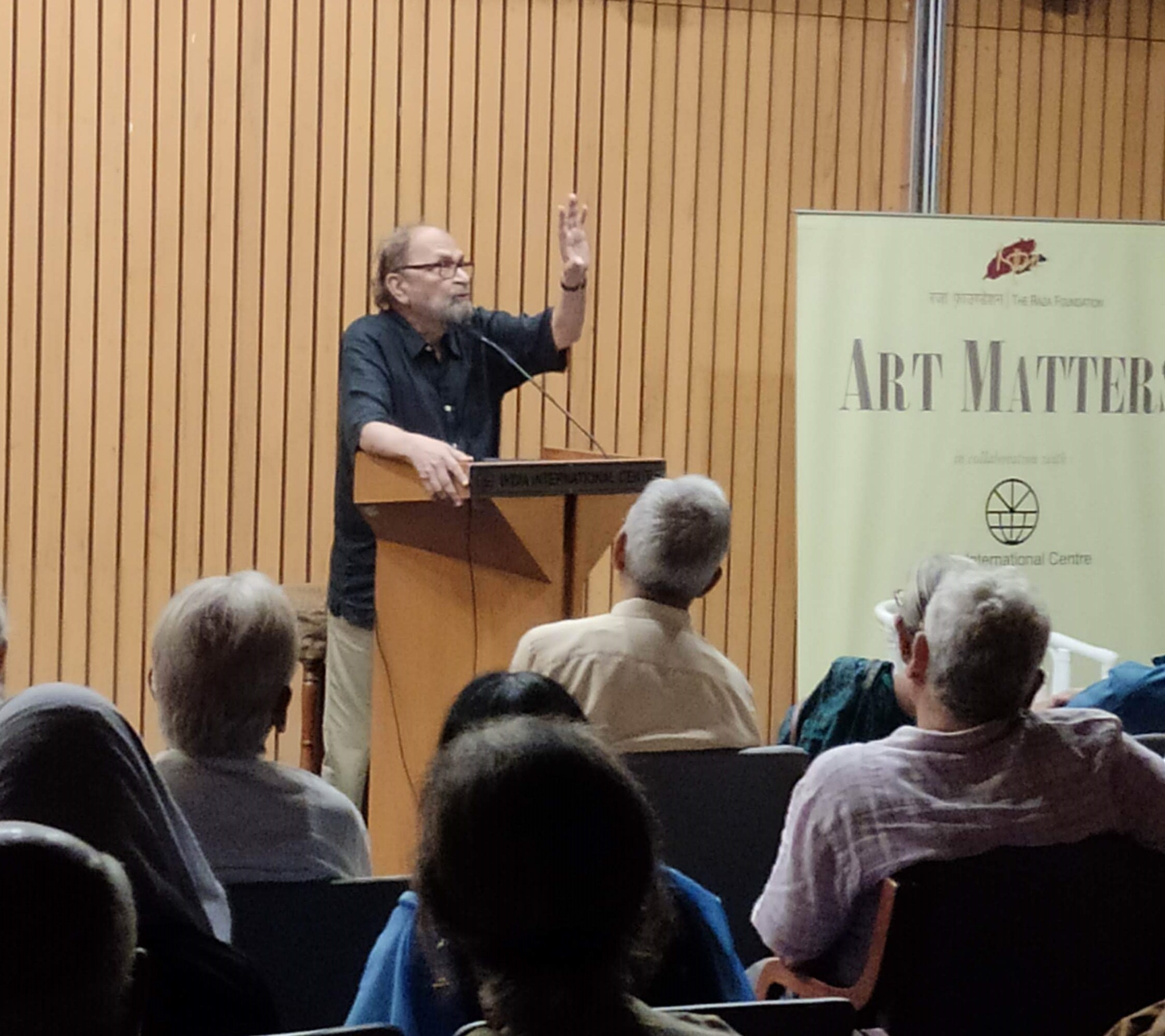
Journalist Saeed Naqvi is speaking on Poetry at Art Matters organised by Raza Foundation, in July 2023.

The Raza Foundation and the India International Centre collaborated on the 'Art Matters' program. It is a platform for all kinds of art, such as performing, visual, and literary arts. To create an atmosphere where artists and audiences may have meaningful debates about art and culture, the programme is the intersection of literature, politics, social justice, poetry, and the arts. The programme includes a number of presentations, panel discussions, performances, and concerts. By offering a forum for both established and arising artists to present their work and ideas, Art Matters pursues to foster creative thinking and innovativeness through these events.

Under 'Art Matter', Gandhi Matters is a series presented by the Raza Foundation. It features unique programs like 'Singing Gandhi', which was held at the India International Centre. This particular event included Kalapini Komkali, who spoke about and performed 'Gandhi Malhar', a raga created by her father, Pt. Kumar Gandharva, to honour Mahatma Gandhi on his birth centenary. The series aims to explore and celebrate Gandhi's legacy through various artistic and cultural expressions.

=== Aaj ki Kavita ===
In July 2017, a new poetry reading series called Aaj Kavita was launched. The purpose of the Raza Foundation's poetry reading sessions is to honour the literary arts. By bringing poets and listeners together, these gatherings provide a forum for exchanging and appreciating poetry. The readings during the sessions frequently include readings by well-known poets and young talent, which encourage a lively literary community and the sharing of thoughts and artistic expression.

=== Bharat Bhushan Agarwal Samman ===
The "Bharat Bhushan Agarwal Samman" is given by the Raza Foundation in honour of the late poet Bharat Bhushan Agarwal. It is a highly esteemed accolade bestowed upon Hindi poetry. This award was once granted for a single poem, but it is currently presented for a collection of poems. The honoured poet receives Rs 21,000 as part of this award. Among the distinguished recipients are: Geet Chaturvedi, Saumya Malviya, Devesh Path Sariya.

=== Raza Fellowships ===
The Raza Foundation offers 'Sayed Haider Raza Fellowship' to scholars, writers, artists, and poets based on the calibre of their proposed projects. The recipients of the Raza fellowship are Geet Chaturvedi, Prof Madhav Hada, Manisha Kulshreshtha, Prof. R. Siva Kumar, Pankaj Chaturvedi, Irfan Zuberi, Aashish Tripathi and Anamika Anu.

== Publication ==
Raza Foundation has supported scholars and artists for their creative and academic publication through finance and publication. There are many publications on personalities and artistic affairs that have come out with the collaboration of respected publication houses. Pustak Mala is a series of 65 such books which includes important books from different languages as well as books based on literature.

The Hindi biography of Pt. Kumar Gandharva, 'Va Ghar Sabse Nyara - Jeevan Charit: Pt. Kumar Gandharva', was penned by poet and litterateur Dhruv Shukla and co-published by Setu Prakashan and Raza Foundation in April 2023.

The latest book on SH Raza is by Mapin publication and Raza Foundation. The book name is Raza: The Other Modern.

== See also ==
- Lalit Kala Akademi
- Cultural heritage
