= Art and culture of Karnataka =

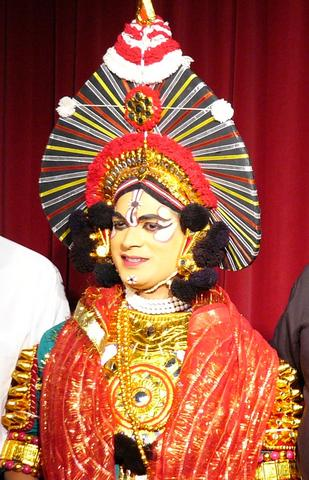
A Yakshagana artist.

Percussion instruments of Karnataka being played at Janapada Loka.

Karnataka, a southern state in India, has a distinct art style and culture informed by a long history of diverse linguistic and religious ethnicities. Apart from Kannadigas, Karnataka is home to Tuluvas, who also consider themselves as Kannadigas. Minor populations of Tibetan Buddhists, Siddhi tribes, and a few other ethnic groups also live in Karnataka. The traditional folk arts are major theatrical forms in coastal Karnataka. Contemporary theatre culture in Karnataka is one of the most vibrant in India, with organizations like Ninasam, Ranga Shankara, and Rangayana on foundations laid by the Gubbi Veeranna Nataka Company. Veeragase, Kamsale, and Dollu Kunitha are popular dance forms. Bharatanatya also enjoys wide patronage in Karnataka.

== Music ==
North Karnataka is predominantly famous for Hindustani music and South Karnataka is well known for Carnatic music.

=== Carnatic music ===
With the rise of Vaishnavism and the Haridasa movement came Karnataka composers like Purandaradasa, whose Kannada language works were lucid, devotional and cultural and hence appealing to the masses. Other haridasas of medieval times were Kanakadasa, Vyasatirtha, Jayatirtha, Sripadaraya, Vadirajatirtha etc., who composed several devara nama. One of the earliest and prominent composers in South India was the saint, and wandering bard of yore Purandara Dasa. Though historians claim Purandara Dasa composed 75,000 - 475,000 songs in Sanskrit and Kannada, only a few hundred of them are known today. He was a source of inspiration to the later composers like Tyagaraja. Owing to his contribution to the Carnatic Music he is referred to as the Father of Carnatic Music (Karnataka Sangeeta Pitamaha). Purandaradasa codified and consolidated the teaching of Carnatic music by evolving several steps like sarali, jantai(Janti), thattu varisai (Thattu Varise), alankara and geetham (geethe) and laid down a framework for imparting formal training in this art form. Later in the 17th and 18th centuries, the haridasa movement would once again contribute to music in Karnataka in the form of haridasas such as Vijaya Dasa, Gopaladasa, Jagannathadasa who are just a few among a vast galaxy of devotional saints.

=== Hindustani music ===
Karnataka has achieved a prominent place in the world of Hindustani music as well. Several of Karnataka's Hindustani musicians won the Kalidas Sanman, Padma Bhushan and Padma Vibhushan awards. Some famous performers are Gangubai Hangal, Puttaraj Gawai, Pt. Bhimsen Joshi, Pt. Mallikarjun Mansur, Basavaraj Rajguru, Sawai Gandharva and Kumar Gandharva.

=== Folk music ===
Folk music is popular in Karnataka. Many singers have recorded numerous folk songs in Kannada including B. K. Sumitra, Bangalore Latha, B. R. Chaya and many. Folk songs including Bhagyada balegara, Nimbiya Banada, Ghallu Ghallenuta, Munjaneddu Kumbaranna, Mayadantha Male Bantanna, Maralladyane and many, are popular, recreated and reused in films as well.

A Kannada Shobhane song sung as the bride arrives at the wedding pandal

== Dance ==
=== Yakshagana ===
Yakshagana a form of dance drama is one of the major theatrical forms in coastal Karnataka. A fusion of folk and classical tradition makes Yakshagana a unique form of art which includes colourful costumes, music, dance, singing, and most importantly dialogs composed on the fly. Award-winning performers include Keremane Shambhu Hegde, Chittani Ramachandra Hegde. Yakshagana and Dollu Kunitha are two of the popular dance forms of Karnataka. Gamaka is a unique music form based on Karnataka Sangeetha.

=== Hulivesha ===
Hulivesha is a dance form popularly displayed on the streets and temples around the coastal Karnataka. The speciality of this dance form is that it requires the dancer to paint his body with the picture of a tiger.

== Painting ==
The Bengal Renaissance, along with the general influence of the Ravi Varma school of painting, influenced the Mysore school of painting. King Krishnaraja Wadiyar III patronised famous painters including Sundarayya, Tanjavur Kondayya and Alasinrayya. King Krishna Raja Wadiyar IV patronised K. Venkatappa, Keshavayya, Y. Nagaraju, Y. Subramanya Raju, Paavanje, and Kamadolli. The Chamarajendra Academy of Visual Arts (CAVA), Jaganmohan Art Gallery and Venkatappa Art Gallery are reminders of this heyday. Chitrakala Parishat is an organisation in Karnataka dedicated to promoting visual arts, particularly folk and traditional art.

Utsav Rock Garden includes multiple sculptures depicting the rural life of Karnataka, as well as a variety of paintings.

== See also ==
- Rangoli Gardens, a model arts heritage village in Bangalore
- Kadalekai Parishe, an annual groundnut fair and cultural festival in Basavanagudi and Malleshwaram of Bangalore
- List of people from Karnataka
