= Samarth Yogi Arwind =

Indian Sanskrit scholar

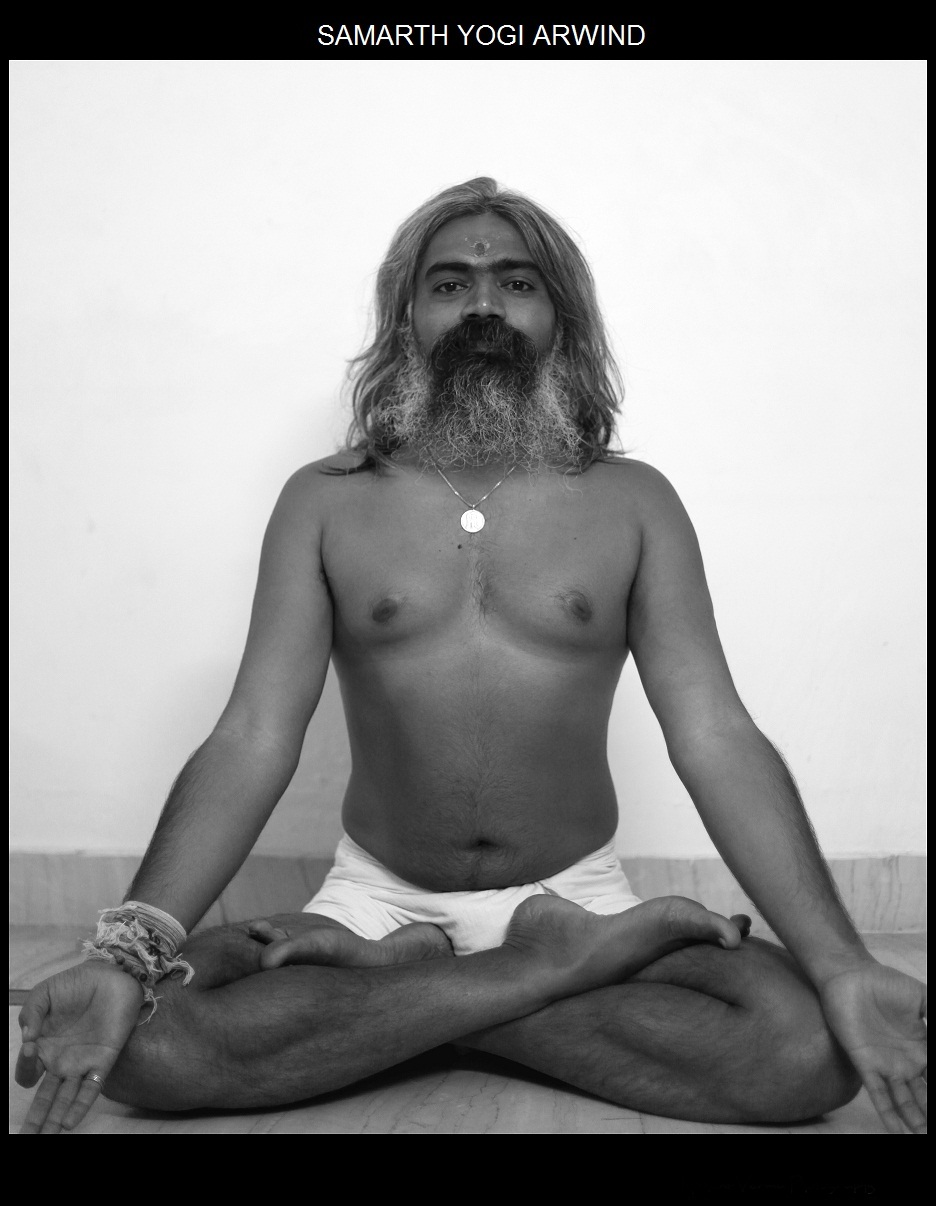
- Samarth Yogi Arwind, Rishikesh
- Other name: Rangi Arwind
- Occupation: Yoga Guru

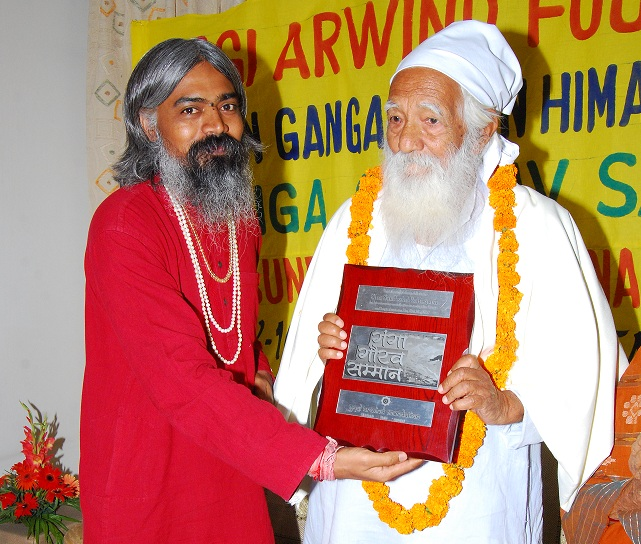
Yogi Arwind presenting Ganga Gaurav Award to Sunderlal Bahuguna

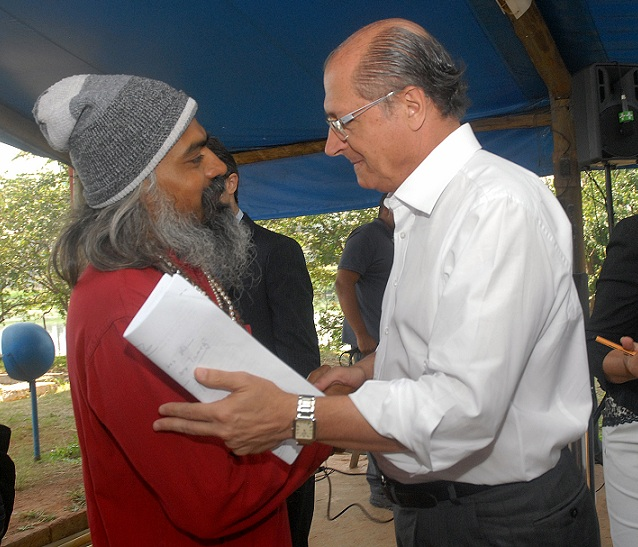
Yogi Arwind & Governor Geraldo Alckmin at Pomar Urbano for clean rivers in Brazil

Samarth Yogi Arwind (Hindi: समर्थ योगी अरविन्द, also known as Yogi Arwind Born:1973) is a Mystic, spiritual leader, researcher of Vedas and Ayurveda, practitioner of Ashtanga Yoga and Kundalini Yoga, and a devotee of Hindustani classical music A proponent of Maitra Yoga (Yoga of Friendship), Arwind is an expert of Yoga Sutras of Patanjali and Vedanta. He is engaged in his sadhana at the Yogi Arwind Ashram at the foothills of Himalayas in Rishikesh. Yogi Arwind walked barefoot for many years in India & other countries. Arwind's philosophy of non-violence as a means of social change is derived from Ashtang Yoga principles. Presently, Yogi Arwind's focus is to plant 10 million Ayurvedic trees & educate people about them.

== 10 Million Ayurvedic Trees Plantation ==
Yogi Arwind has been running a campaign to plant one crore (10 Million) Ayurvedic plants all over India. The project started in 2014 and he has planted trees in Rajasthan, Gujarat, Karnataka, Madhya Pradesh, Uttarakhand & Maharashtra. Currently the main centre of this plantation drive is at Bhavani Yoga Kshetra in Tuljapur tehsil of drought hit Marathwada region. More than one hundred different species have been already planted. Bhavani Yoga Kshetra will not only plant Ayurvedic trees, but will develop human resources with the knowledge of the plants, their usage in various ailments etc. - by organising workshops, site visits & tours.

== Ganga (Ganges) Campaign ==
Arwind has been promoting the message of Clean Ganga through his organization Yogi Arwind Foundation. Various initiatives for Clean Ganga have been undertaken by Yogi Arwind Foundation. Yogi Arwind Foundation has instituted 'Ganga Gaurav Samman' (Ganga Pride Award) for a personality working selflessly in the area of protection and preservation of rivers and water resources. Shri Sunderlal Bahuguna, noted environmentalist was the recipient of the First Ganga Gaurav Samman. To promote the Clean Ganga message, a grand music concert 'Leher Leher Kabir' was organised in Rishikesh. India's leading classical music performers like Channulal Mishra, Vasundhara Komkali, Shubha Mudgal, Prahlad Tipanya, Astad Deboo, and Kalapini Komkali performed in the concert.

Arwind participated in a Clean Rivers drive 'Pomar Urbano' in Brazil. Along with the Governor of the State of São Paulo Geraldo Alckmin, corporate heads of Brazilian companies and prominent personalities were present there.

== Punarvasu Award for Ayurveda ==
Arwind has wandered extensively in the Himalayas & other parts of India researching Ayurvedic herbs, use of herbs by villagers & tribes in different ailments. He has planted thousands of Ayurvedic plants during his all India spiritual journey.

Yogi Arwind Ashram has instituted Punarvasu Award for the exemplary services in Ayurveda. Madhav Rajpathak, Swanand Pandit and Ayurveda Seva Sangh of Nashik were awarded with the Punarvasu Award.

== Blankets for Himalayas ==
Yogi Arwind has initiated the campaign 'Blankets for Himalayas' to help the poor people living in the Himalayan region. The campaign was started after the Uttarakhand floods. Thousands of people from Gadhwal region of Himalayas have benefited from this campaign. It is an ongoing campaign.
