= Samarth =

Samarth may refer to:

== People ==
- Samarth Ramdas, 17th-century Indian saint and Marathi poet
- Swami Samarth, 19th-century Indian guru
- Samarth Patel, Kenyan cricketer
- Samarth Seth, Indian cricketer
- Samarth Singh, Indian cricketer
- Samarth Vyas, Indian cricketer
- Samarth Yogi Arwind, Indian Sanskrit scholar
- Kumarsen Samarth, Indian filmmaker
- Nitin Samarth, American physicist
- Ravikumar Samarth, Indian cricketer
- Shobhna Samarth, Indian actress
- Tanuja or Tanuja Samarth, Indian actress

== Others ==
- Samarth, a 1968 horror novel by Indian writer Narayan Dharap
- Samarth-class offshore patrol vessel, class of Indian Coast Guard patrol vessels
- Mukherjee-Samarth family, Indian film family
- Samarth Vyayam Mandir, physical education institution in Shivaji Park, Mumbai, India

== See also ==
- Samartha Vashishtha, Indian poet
