= Bhagyada balegara =

"Bhagyada balegara hogi ba" (Kannada: ಭಾಗ್ಯಾದ ಬಳೆಗಾರ ಹೋಗಿ ಬಾ, meaning Dear bangle seller, please go to my home town) is a popular Kannada folk song. The song is about a conversation between a newly married lady and a bangle seller. The lady asks the bangle seller to visit her parents' house, but the seller says that he does not know how to get there. The lady gives directions to her parents' hometown in a poetic way.

"Bhagyada balegara" is very popular in Karnataka and throughout South India. The song is a regular feature of folk music programmes in the state.

Many singers have covered this song, including K. S. Chitra, Madhu Balakrishnan, B. R. Chaya, SPB, Manjula Gururaj, Kasturi Shankar, Rathnamala Prakash, Nanditha, Shreya Ghoshal, Kunal Ganjawala, and Amma Ramachandra.

== Lyrics ==
=== Text of the composition ===
         ಹೆಣ್ಣು ಮಗಳು:  
      ಭಾಗ್ಯದ ಬಳೆಗಾರ ಹೋಗಿ ಬಾ ನನ್ ತವರೀಗೇ  
      ಭಾಗ್ಯದ ಬಳೆಗಾರ ಹೋಗಿ ಬಾ ನನ್ ತವರೀಗೇ
           ಭಾಗ್ಯದ ಬಳೆಗಾರ ಹೋಗಿ ಬಾ ನನ್ ತವರೀಗೇ
           ಭಾಗ್ಯದ ಬಳೆಗಾರ ಹೋಗಿ ಬಾ ನನ್ ತವರೀಗೇ

           ಬಳೆಗಾರ :    
           ನಿನ್ನ ತವರೂರಾ ನಾನೇನು ಬಲ್ಲೆನು
           ನಿನ್ನ ತವರೂರಾ ನಾನೇನು ಬಲ್ಲೆನು
           ಗೊತ್ತಿಲ್ಲ ಎನಗೆ ಗುರಿಯಿಲ್ಲ ಎಲೆಬಾಲೆ
           ಗೊತ್ತಿಲ್ಲ ಎನಗೆ ಗುರಿಯಿಲ್ಲ ಎಲೆಬಾಲೆ
           ತೋರಿಸು ಬಾರೆ ತವರೂರ

           ಹೆಣ್ಣು ಮಗಳು : 
           ಭಾಗ್ಯದ ಬಳೆಗಾರ ಹೋಗಿ ಬಾ ನನ್ ತವರೀಗೇ
           ಭಾಗ್ಯದ ಬಳೆಗಾರ ಹೋಗಿ ಬಾ ನನ್ ತವರೀಗೇ

           ಬಾಳೆ ಬಲಕ್ಕೆ ಬೀಡು ಸೀಬೆ ಎಡಕ್ಕೆ ಬೀಡು
           ಬಾಳೆ ಬಲಕ್ಕೆ ಬೀಡು ಸೀಬೆ ಎಡಕ್ಕೆ ಬೀಡು
           ನಟ್ಟ ನಡುವೇಲ್ಲಿ ನೀ ಹೋಗು ಬಳೆಗಾರ
           ನಟ್ಟ ನಡುವೇಲ್ಲಿ ನೀ ಹೋಗು ಬಳೆಗಾರ
           ಅಲ್ಲಿಹುದೆನ್ನಾ ತವರೂರು

           ಬಳೆಗಾರ :    
           ಮುತ್ತೈದೆ ಎಲೆ ಹೆಣ್ಣೆ ತೋರು ಬಾ ನಿನ್ನ ತವರೂರಾ
           ಮುತ್ತೈದೆ ಎಲೆ ಹೆಣ್ಣೆ ತೋರು ಬಾ ನಿನ್ನ ತವರೂರಾ

          ಹೆಣ್ಣು ಮಗಳು: 
          ಹಂಚಿನಾ ಮನೆ ಕಾಣೋ ಕಂಚಿನಾ ಕದ ಕಾಣೋ
          ಹಂಚಿನಾ ಮನೆ ಕಾಣೋ ಕಂಚಿನಾ ಕದ ಕಾಣೋ
          ಇಂಚಾಡೋವೆರಡು ಗಿಳಿ ಕಾಣೋ ಬಳೆಗಾರ
          ಅಲ್ಲಿಹುದೆನ್ನಾ ತವರೂರು

          ಬಳೆಗಾರ:    
          ಮುತ್ತೈದೆ ಎಲೆ ಹೆಣ್ಣೆ ತೋರು ಬಾ ನಿನ್ನ ತವರೂರಾ
          ಮುತ್ತೈದೆ ಎಲೆ ಹೆಣ್ಣೆ ತೋರು ಬಾ ನಿನ್ನ ತವರೂರಾ

          ಹೆಣ್ಣು ಮಗಳು: 
          ಆಲೆ ಆಡುತ್ತಾವೇ ಗಾಣ ತಿರುಗುತ್ತಾವೇ
          ಆಲೆ ಆಡುತ್ತಾವೇ ಗಾಣ ತಿರುಗುತ್ತಾವೇ
          ನವಿಲು ಸಾರಂಗ ನಲಿದಾವೇ ಬಳೆಗಾರ
          ಅಲ್ಲಿಹುದೆನ್ನಾ ತವರೂರು

           ಬಳೆಗಾರ:    
          ಮುತ್ತೈದೆ ಎಲೆ ಹೆಣ್ಣೆ ತೋರು ಬಾ ನಿನ್ನ ತವರೂರಾ
          ಮುತ್ತೈದೆ ಎಲೆ ಹೆಣ್ಣೆ ತೋರು ಬಾ ನಿನ್ನ ತವರೂರಾ

          ಹೆಣ್ಣು ಮಗಳು: 
          ಮುತ್ತೈದೆ ಹಟ್ಟೀಲಿ ಮುತ್ತಿನ ಚಪ್ರ ಹಾಸಿ
          ಮುತ್ತೈದೆ ಹಟ್ಟೀಲಿ ಮುತ್ತಿನ ಚಪ್ರ ಹಾಸಿ
          ನಟ್ಟ ನಡುವೇಲ್ಲಿ ಪಗಡೆಯ ಆಡುತ್ತಾಳೆ
          ನಟ್ಟ ನಡುವೇಲ್ಲಿ ಪಗಡೆಯ ಆಡುತ್ತಾಳೆ
          ಅವಳೆ ಕಣೋ ನನ್ನ ಹಡೆದವ್ವ

             ಬಳೆಗಾರ:    
          ಮುತ್ತೈದೆ ಎಲೆ ಹೆಣ್ಣೆ ತೋರು ಬಾ ನಿನ್ನ ತವರೂರಾ
          ಮುತ್ತೈದೆ ಎಲೆ ಹೆಣ್ಣೆ ತೋರು ಬಾ ನಿನ್ನ ತವರೂರಾ

          ಹೆಣ್ಣು ಮಗಳು: 
          ಅಚ್ಚ ಕೆಂಪಿನ ಬಳೆ,ಹಸಿರು ಗೀರಿನ ಬಳೆ
          ಅಚ್ಚ ಕೆಂಪಿನ ಬಳೆ,ಹಸಿರು ಗೀರಿನ ಬಳೆ
          ನನ್ನ ಹಡೆದವ್ವಗೆ ಬಲು ಆಸೆ ಬಳೆಗಾರ
          ನನ್ನ ಹಡೆದವ್ವಗೆ ಬಲು ಆಸೆ ಬಳೆಗಾರ
          ಕೊಂಡು ಹೋಗೊ ನನ್ನ ತವರೀಗೆ
             ಭಾಗ್ಯದ ಬಳೆಗಾರ ಹೋಗಿ ಬಾ ನನ್ ತವರೀಗೇ
             ಭಾಗ್ಯದ ಬಳೆಗಾರ ಹೋಗಿ ಬಾ ನನ್ ತವರೀಗೇ

          ಬಳೆಗಾರ:   
          ನಿನ್ನ ತವರೂರ ನಾನೀಗ ಬಲ್ಲೆನು
          ಗೊತ್ತಾಯ್ತು ಎನಗೆ, ಗುರಿಯಾಯ್ತು ಎಲೆ ಹೆಣ್ಣೆ
          ಹೋಗಿ ಬರ್ತೀನಿ ನಿನ್ನ ತವರೀಗೆ[4]

=== English transliteration ===
                LADY :          
              Bhaagyada baLegaara hOgi bA nan thavarIgE
              Bhaagyada baLegaara hOgi bA nan thavarIgE
              
              BANGLE SELLER 
              ninna thavarUrA naanEnu ballenu
              ninna thavarUrA naanEnu ballenu
              goththilla enage guriyilla elebaale
              goththilla enage guriyilla elebaale
              thOrisu bAre thavarUra
               
              LADY:
              Bhaagyada baLegaara hOgi bA nan thavarIgE
              Bhaagyada baLegaara hOgi bA nan thavarIgE
  
               LADY:
              bALe balakke bIdu sIbe edakke bIdu
              bALe balakke bIdu sIbe edakke bIdu
              natta naduvElli nI hOgu baLegAra
              natta naduvElli nI hOgu baLegAra
              allihudhennA thavarUru

              BANGLE SELLER: 
              muththaidhe ele heNNe thOru bA nin thavarUrA
              muththaidhe ele heNNe thOru bA nin thavarUrA

                LADY:          
              hanchina mane kANO kanchina kadha kANO
              hanchina mane kANO kanchina kadha kANO
              inchaadOveradu giLi kANO baLegaara
              allihudhennA thavarUru

              BANGLE SELLER: 
              muththaidhe ele heNNe thOru bA ninna thavarUrA
              muththaidhe ele heNNe thOru bA ninna thavarUrA

               LADY:          
              Ale AduththAvE gANa thiruguththAvE
              Ale AduththAvE gANa thiruguththAvE
              navilu saaranga nalidhAvE baLegaara
              allihudhennA thavarUru

                BANGLE SELLER: 
              muththaidhe ele heNNe thOru bA ninna thavarUrA
              muththaidhe ele heNNe thOru bA ninna thavarUrA

               LADY:
              muththaidhe hattIli muththina chapra haasi
              muththaidhe hattIli muththina chapra haasi
              natta naduvElli pagadeya AduththaaLe
              natta naduvElli pagadeya AduththaaLe
              avaLe kaNO nanna hadedhavva

              BANGLE SELLER: 
              muththaidhe ele heNNe thOru bA ninna thavarUrA
              muththaidhe ele heNNe thOru bA ninna thavarUrA

               LADY:          
              achcha kempina baLe,hasiru gIrina baLe
              achcha kempina baLe,hasiru gIrina baLe
              nanna hadedhavvage balu Ase baLegaara
              nanna hadedhavvage balu Ase baLegaara
              kondu hOgo nanna thavarIge
                 
                LADY:
              Bhaagyadha baLegaara hOgi bA nan thavarIgE
              Bhaagyadha baLegaara hOgi bA nan thavarIgE
              Bhaagyadha baLegaara hOgi bA nan thavarIgE
              Bhaagyadha baLegaara hOgi bA nan thavarIgE

              BANGLE SELLER: 
              ninna thavarUra nAnEga bllenu
              gotthAithu enage guriyAythu ele bAle
              hOgi barthini ninna thavrige

              LADY:          
              Bhaagyadha baLegaara hOgi bA nan thavarIgE
              Bhaagyadha baLegaara hOgi bA nan thavarIgE

              BANGLE SELLER: 
              mutthaide ele heNNe hOguve nin thavarige

              LADY:          
              Bhaagyadha baLegaara hOgi bA nan thavarIgE

              BANGLE SELLER: 
              mutthaide ele heNNe hOguve nin thavarige

=== English translation ===
LADY:
              Dear Bangle seller,
              please go to my hometown

              BANGLE SELLER:
              how am I supposed to know which is your  hometown? 
              I Don't know the directions. Show me how to get there

              LADY:
              you'll see banana plantation at the right, 
              Guava plantation at the left,
              Please take the road which lies in between these two,
              it takes you to my home

              BANGLE SELLER:
              Hey newly married lady,
              Please show me your home

              LADY:
              The home built with red tiles and 
              the door is made from Bronze,
              there'll be two parrots singing, that's my home

              BANGLE SELLER:
              Hey newly married lady,
              Please show me your home

              LADY:
              Jaggery will be making, oil wheel will be rotating
              Peacocks, spotted deer will be dancing
              that's my hometown

               BANGLE SELLER:
              Hey newly married lady,
              Please show me your home

              LADY:
              The tent decorated with pearls- my mother still plays game of dice inside it 
              (Signifies that the celebration of marriage is not
              yet over and 
              the temporary construction erected for marriage related functions is still fresh).

              BANGLE SELLER:
              Hey newly married lady,
              Please show me your home

              LADY:
              My mother loves dark red bangles and 
              green bangle with cros..
              please take them there when you go there

              Dear fortune bangle seller
              please go to my hometown

              BANGLE SELLER:
              Now I know about your home, 
              I got the directions,
              I will certainly visit it.
