= Vijay Sardeshmukh =

Indian musical artist (1952–2019)

Pt. Vijay Sardeshmukh
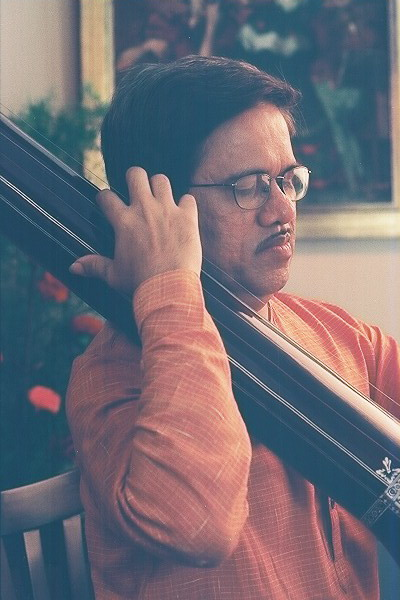
- Pt. Vijay Sardeshmukh

Background information
- Born: Vijay; June 23, 1952
- Origin: Pune, Maharashtra, India
- Died: October 5, 2019 (aged 67) Pune
- Genre: Hindustani Classical Music
- Occupation: Hindustani Classical Vocalist
- Years active: 1974–2019

Pandit Vijay Sardeshmukh (23 June 1952 – 5 October 2019) was an Indian classical vocalist and disciple of Kumar Gandharva. Sardeshmukh was an honored guru for post graduation studies in Pune University.

== Career ==
Sardeshmukh was initiated into music by his father, Vitthalrao Sardeshmukh. Vitthalrao was a Sanskrit pandit, a vocalist (a disciple of Sureshbabu Mane of Kirana Gharana) and an accomplished harmonium player. He accompanied many vocalists of renown, including Pt. Bhimsen Joshi and Pt. Kumar Gandharva. Kumar Gandharva, who was a good friend of Vitthalrao, later became Sardeshmukh's guru. Sardeshmukh learned from Kumar Gandharva from 1971 and onwards. Vijay made his debut in "Swar sadhana Conference" organized in Pune in 1974, and since then he has performed in many concerts of repute, including the Sawai Gandharva and Tansen Samaroha. He was Graded Artist of All India Radio and Doordarshan, being recognized since 1977. His cassettes and CDs are released by His Master's Voice and Alurkar Music House Pune. Amongst Pt. Kumar Gandharva's disciples, Sardeshmukh's presentation has been widely recognized as being very close to that of his Guru. A meditative quality prevailed in Kumar Gandharva's music and it can be richly experienced listening to his music. Kumar Gandharva's education always included singing as well as discussion. It was this fusion of thought processes and music that Sardeshmukh inherited from Kumar Gandharva which prompted concerts like Kalyan Darshan and Tambe Geet Rajani.

Sardeshmukh’s voice was molded further under Kumar Gandharva's guidance, a teacher who was known to be well versed with the science of voice culture. Two Tanpuras, tuned to the highest degree of perfection, play a vital role in his music. To quote Kumar Gandharva’s thought behind this: "This is our canvass, how can an artist paint in thin air?" Drawing on the tanpuras, Sardeshmukh was known to make the air vibrant with various ragas with the minutest of Shruti differences. Known for his soft-spoken and modest nature, Sardeshmukh was a man of few words but boundless music that flowed from within.

Sardeshmukh is also a well-known Guru. Many vocalists trained under him, players such as Shubhada Kulkarni, Pushkar Lele, Ajay Purkar, Tanavi Jagdale-Sardeshmukh, Swarada Godbole, Pritam Nakil, Milap Rane, and Mandar Karanjkar.

== Awards ==
1. Vatsalabai Joshi Award

== Personal life ==
Sardeshmukh retired from the service of Bank of India and has devoted his life to classical music. He has two sons Swanand and Swaroop.

== Death ==
Sardeshmukh died on 5 October 2019 in Pune from prolonged illness of blood cancer.

== Main Performances ==
1. AARAT BANI - Bal Gandharva Rangamandir, Pune (1986)
2. SPIC MACAY, Pune (1988)
3. Vishnu Digambar Sangeet Mahotsava, New Delhi (1990)
4. Sawai Gandharva Sangeet Mahotsava, Pune (1988, 1994, 2007)
5. Kumar Gandharva Mahotsava, Pune (1993)
6. Shankarro Bodas Smriti Samaroh, Kanpur (1994)
7. Kumarjee Smriti Conference, Kolhapur (1995)
8. 'Kaal-Jayee', India International Centre, New Delhi (1995)
9. 'Todi Mahotsava', Mumbai (1995)
10. NCPA Mumbai (1999)
11. School of Architecture, Ahmedabad (2000)
12. Prayaag Sangeet Sammelan, Allahabad (2001)
13. ITC Conference, Calcutta (2001)
14. Gharana Sammelan, Kolhapur (2001)
15. Chaturang Pratishthan, Mumbai (2002)
16. Bharat Bhavan, Bhopal (2005)
17. "Nakshtrache Dene" (2005)
18. Sur Samvardhan, Pune (2005)
19. Dewal Club, Kolhapur (2005)
20. Maharashtra Cultural Centre - Thematic presentation on 'Kalyan Darshan' (2006)
21. Anahat Nad, Mudgaon (2007)
22. Chandrapur Music Conference (2007)
23. DV Paluskar Pratishthan, Pune (2007)
