= Mukul Shivputra =

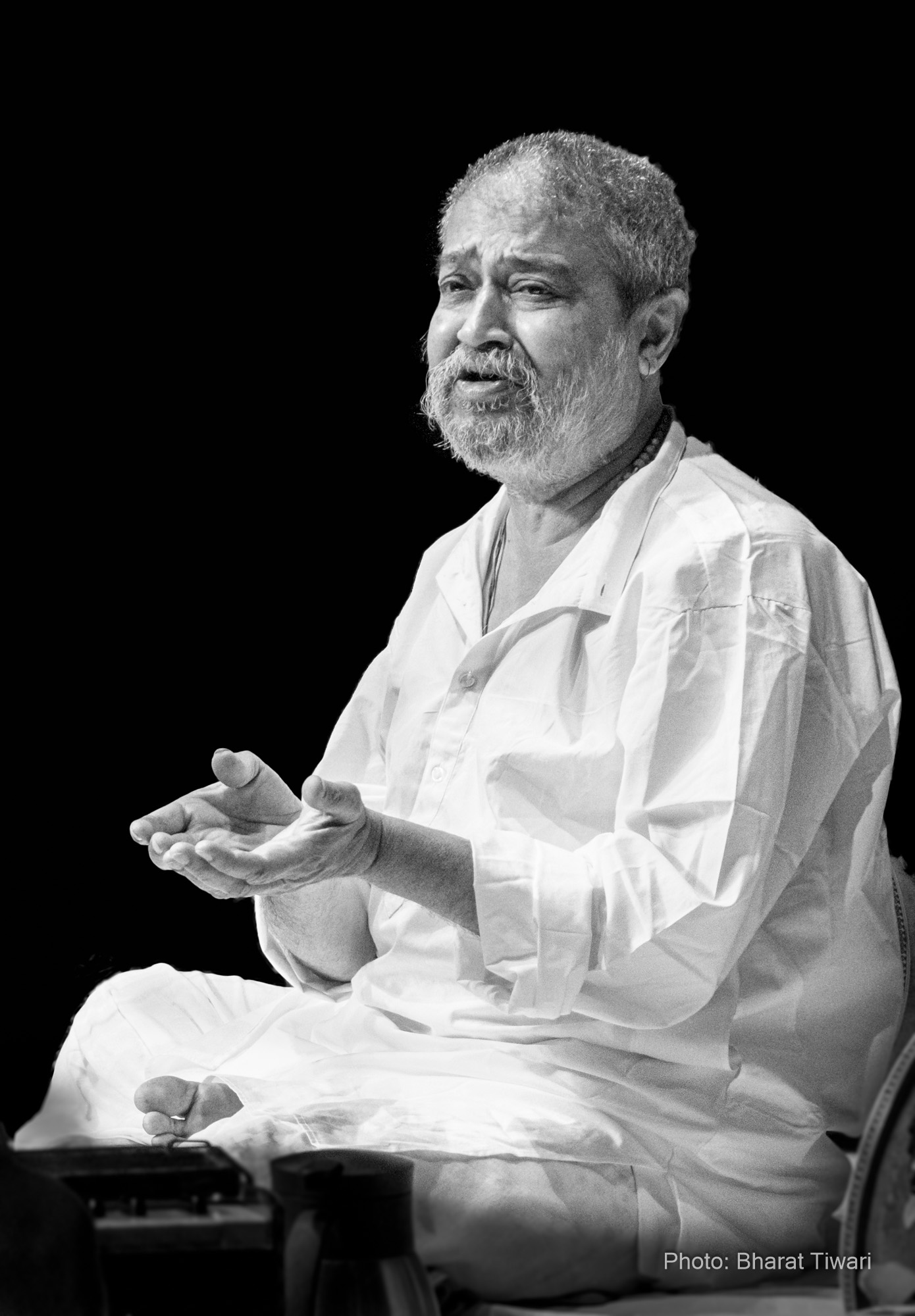

Background information
- Born: Mukul Shivputra Komkalimath; 25 March 1956 (age 69)
- Origin: Dewas, Indore, Madhya Pradesh, India
- Genres: Khayal, Bhajans, Thumris
- Occupation: Hindustani classical vocalist
- Instrument: Vocal
- Years active: 1975–present
- Website: gandharvasabha.com

Pandit Mukul Shivputra (born 25 March 1956) (previously known as Mukul Komkalimath) is a Hindustani Classical vocalist of the Gwalior Gharana and the son and foremost disciple of Pt. Kumar Gandharva.

== Early life and training ==
Born in Bhopal to Bhanumati Kouns and Kumar Gandharva, Mukul took to musical training early on from his father. He continued his musical education in Dhrupad and Dhamar with K. G. Ginde and in Carnatic Music with M. D. Ramanathan.

== Performing career ==
Since his teens, Pt. Shivputra regularly accompanied his father on Tanpura for vocal support. In 1975, Pt. Shivputra, then known as "Mukul Komkalimath," debuted his first performance at the 23rd Sawai Gandharva Music Festival being the first in his generation of singers to debut a performance at the prestigious venue.

== Personal life ==
Mukul lost his wife after the birth of their son, Bhuvanesh Komkali, who is also a vocalist. He currently lives in Pune.

He conducts workshops to identify young talent and plans to set up his own music school

== Articles on Performances ==
- Bharat Natya Mandir, Pune 20 July 2012
- Vriddha Anand Ashram, Akurdi near Pune, 17 August 2012
- Pune, 10 March 2013
- https://www.gandharvasabha.com
