= Mavalli =

- village
- Location in Karnataka, India Mavalli (India)
- Coordinates: 14°05′32.97″N 74°29′36.626″E
- Country: India
- State: Karnataka
- District: Uttara Kannada
- Talukas: Bhatkal

Population (2011)
  - Total: 17,062

Languages
  - Official: Kannada
- Time zone: UTC+5:30 (IST)
- Postal code: 581350

Mavalli is a village in Bhatkal Taluk, located in the coastal Karnataka in Uttar Kannada District.

== Demographics ==
As of 2011 India census, The total population of Mavalli is 17,062, out of which 8,267 are males and 8,795 are females; thus, the average sex ratio of Mavalli is 1,064. And the literacy rate in Mavalli is 85.1%. Thus, Mavalli village has a higher literacy rate compared to 75.3% of Uttara Kannada district. The male literacy rate is 89.87% and the female literacy rate is 80.65% in Mavalli village.

== See also ==
- Mavalli Tiffin Rooms
- Uttara Kannada
- Mangalore
- Districts of Karnataka
