= Kalapini Komkali =

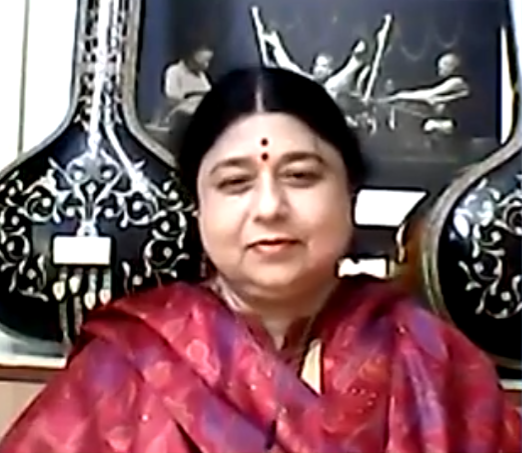
- In a 2021 interview
- Born: 12 March 1966 (age 60); Dewas, Madhya Pradesh, India
- Occupation: Singer
- Parent(s): Kumar Gandharva and Vasundhara Komkali
- Awards: Sangeet Natak Akademi Award
- Musical career
- Genre: Hindustani classical music
- Instrument: Vocals
- Website: kalapini.com

Kalapini Komkali (born 1966) is an Indian classical vocalist from Madhya Pradesh. In 2023 she received Sangeet Natak Akademi Award in Hindustani Vocal.

== Biography ==
Kalapini Komkali was born on 12 March 1966, in Dewas, Madhya Pradesh. She is daughter of classical vocalists Kumar Gandharva and Vasundhara Komkali. She is from Dewas in Madhya Pradesh. She is an active trustee of the Kumar Gandharva Sangeet Academy.

== Musical career ==
Trained in music by her parents Kumar Gandharva and Vasundhara Komkali, Kalapini has developed her own singing style, and has excelled in various forms of Hindustani classical music, including khayal, thumri, dadra, and bhajan. A distinctive feature of her singing style is her use of folk music from the Malwa region of Madhya Pradesh. Her first solo performance was in 1993. Her solo commercial music releases include, Aarambha and Inheritence by His Master's Voice, Dharohar by Times Music, and Swar-Manjari, a live concert recording by Virgin Records. She has also sung for the films Paheli and Devi Ahalya.

== Live performances ==
Singing Gandhi, part of the series Gandhi Matters by Raza Foundation, was a musical tribute to Mahathma Gandhi. Kalapini and Bhuvanesh Komakali performed their Jugalbandi concert on the occasion of Raza's centenary.

== Awards and honors ==
Kalapini has received a fellowship from the Department of Culture, Government of India, and has also been honored with the Kumar Gandharva Award by the Pujari Pratishthan of Pune. In 2023 she received Sangeet Natak Akademi Award in Hindustani Vocal.
