= Vasundhara Komkali =

Indian singer (1931–2015)

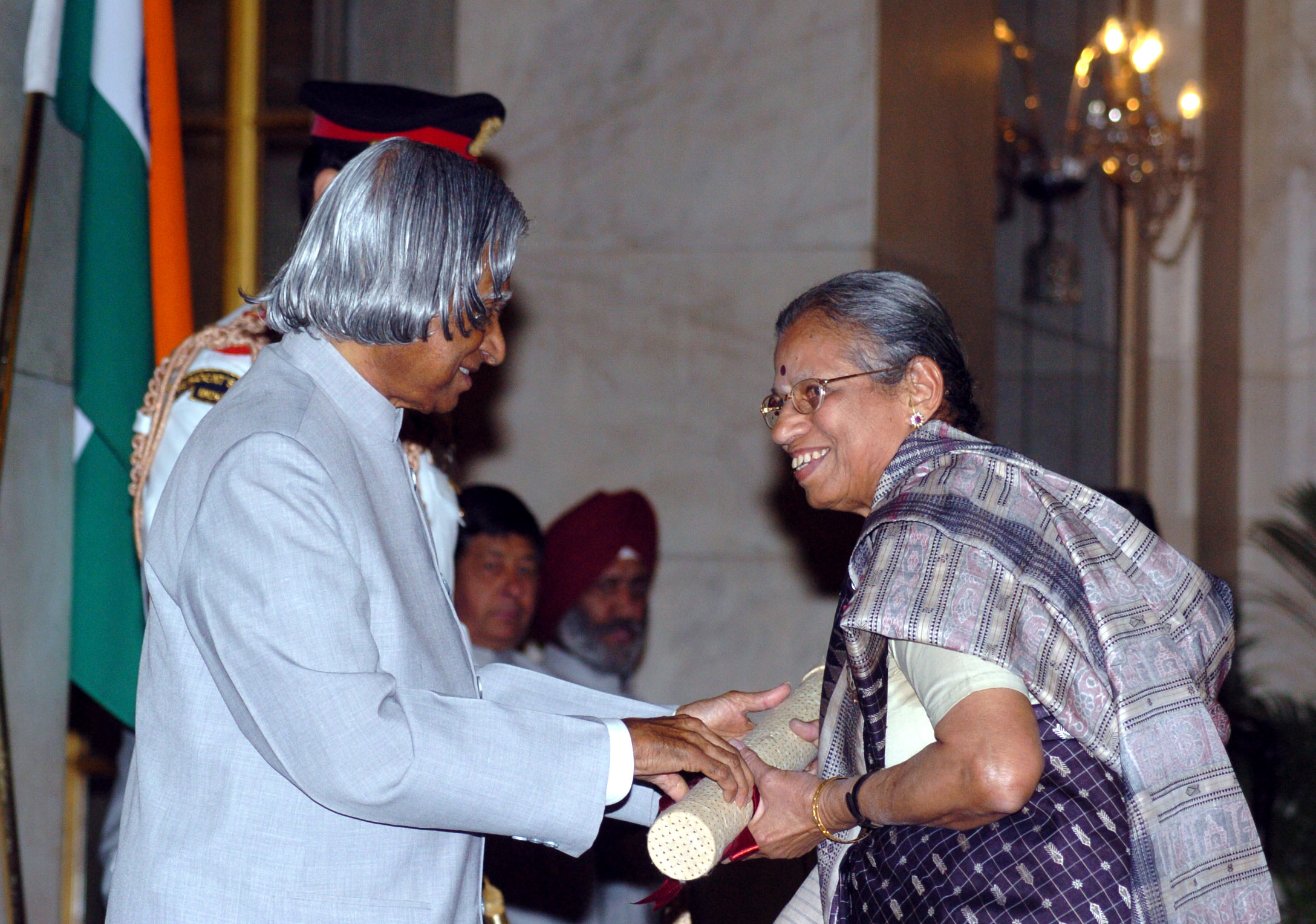
- Vasundhara receiving Padma Shri, 2006
- Born: 23 May 1931; Jamshedpur, Jharkhand, India
- Died: 29 July 2015 (aged 84); Dewas, Madhya Pradesh, India
- Resting place: Dewas; 22°57′48.6″N 76°02′44.8″E
- Other name: Vasundhara Shrikhande
- Occupation: Classical musician
- Years active: 1943–2015
- Known for: Hindustani vocals
- Spouse: Kumar Gandharva
- Children: Kalapini Komkali
- Awards: Padma Shri; Sangeet Natak Akademi Award

Vasundhara Komkali (1931–2015), popularly known as Vasundhara Tai, was an Indian classical musician and one of the leading exponents of the Gwalior gharana, an old Khyal tradition of Hindustani music. She was the wife of renowned musician, Kumar Gandharva, and was a recipient of the 2009 Sangeet Natak Akademi Award. The Government of India awarded her the fourth highest civilian honour of the Padma Shri, in 2006, for her contributions to Indian classical music.

== Early life and training ==
Vasundhara Komakali, née Vasundhara Shrikhande, was born on 23 May 1931 in a music loving family in Jamshedpur, the largest city in the Indian state of Jharkhand. Her early years were in Kolkata where she met Kumar Gandharva when she was 12 years old, at the All India Music Conference and informed him of her desire to learn classical music under the renowned musician. Gandharva asked her to come to Mumbai but the World War II had already begun which prevented her from moving to Mumbai.

== Career ==
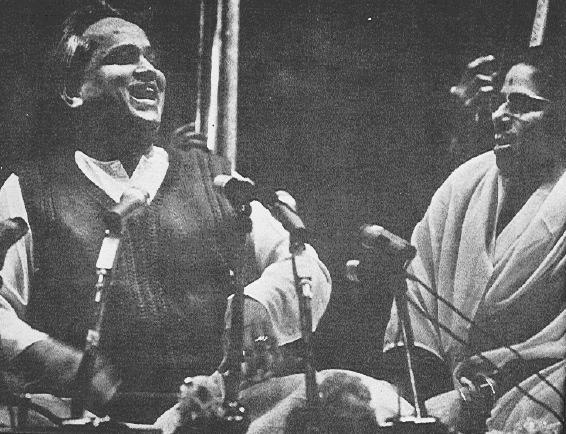
Kumar Gandharva with Vasundhara Komkali at a concert

Staying in Kolkata, she learnt music and started performing for the Kolkata station of the All India Radio. After the war, she moved to Mumbai in 1946 and started training under B. R. Deodhar, a prominent vocalist and musicologist, as Gandharva could not find time to teach her during that time. Later, she returned to Gandharva for training and married the musician in 1962.

Vasundhara performed as a vocal accompanist to Kumar Gandharva for the next thirty years and took up solo performance only after the latter's death in 1992. Adhering to the khyal tradition of the Gwalior gharana of which her guru, Deodhar was known for, she performed in various stages in India. She received the Sangeet Natak Akademi Award for Hindustani vocals in 1998. Six years later, the Government of India honoured her again with the civilian award of the Padma Shri in 2006.

Vasundhara Komkali died on 29 July 2015, at the age of 84, following a cardiac arrest, at her residence in Dewas of Madhya Pradesh and her last rites were performed in Dewas. Her daughter, Kalapini Komkali, is a noted vocalist of Hindustani music.

== See also ==
- Hindustani music
- Kumar Gandharva
- Gwalior gharana
- B. R. Deodhar
