= Rangoli Gardens =

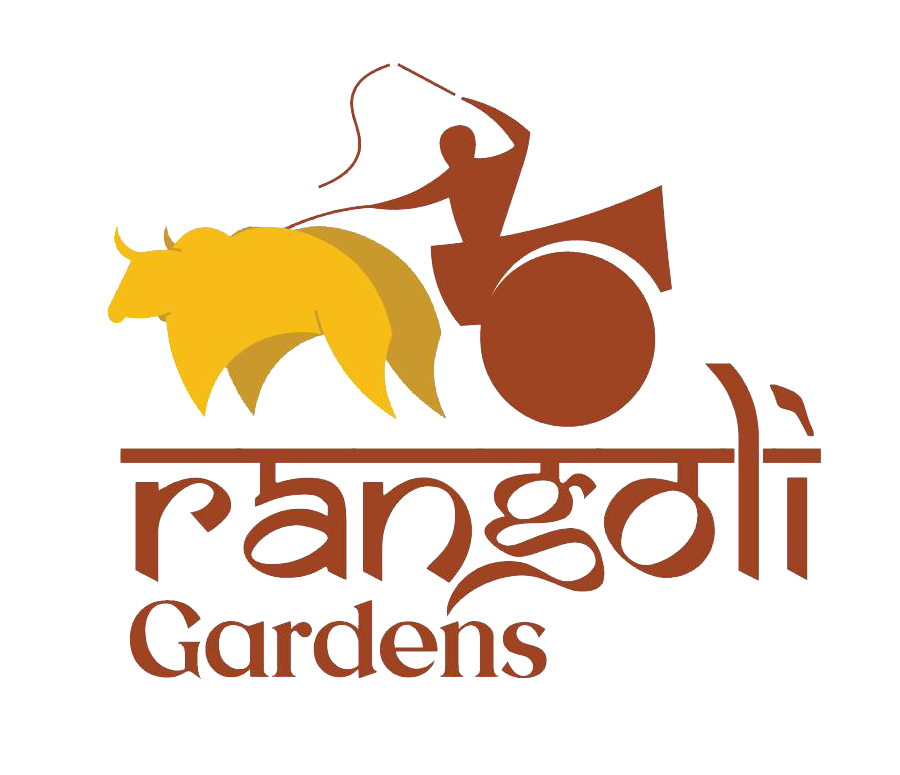

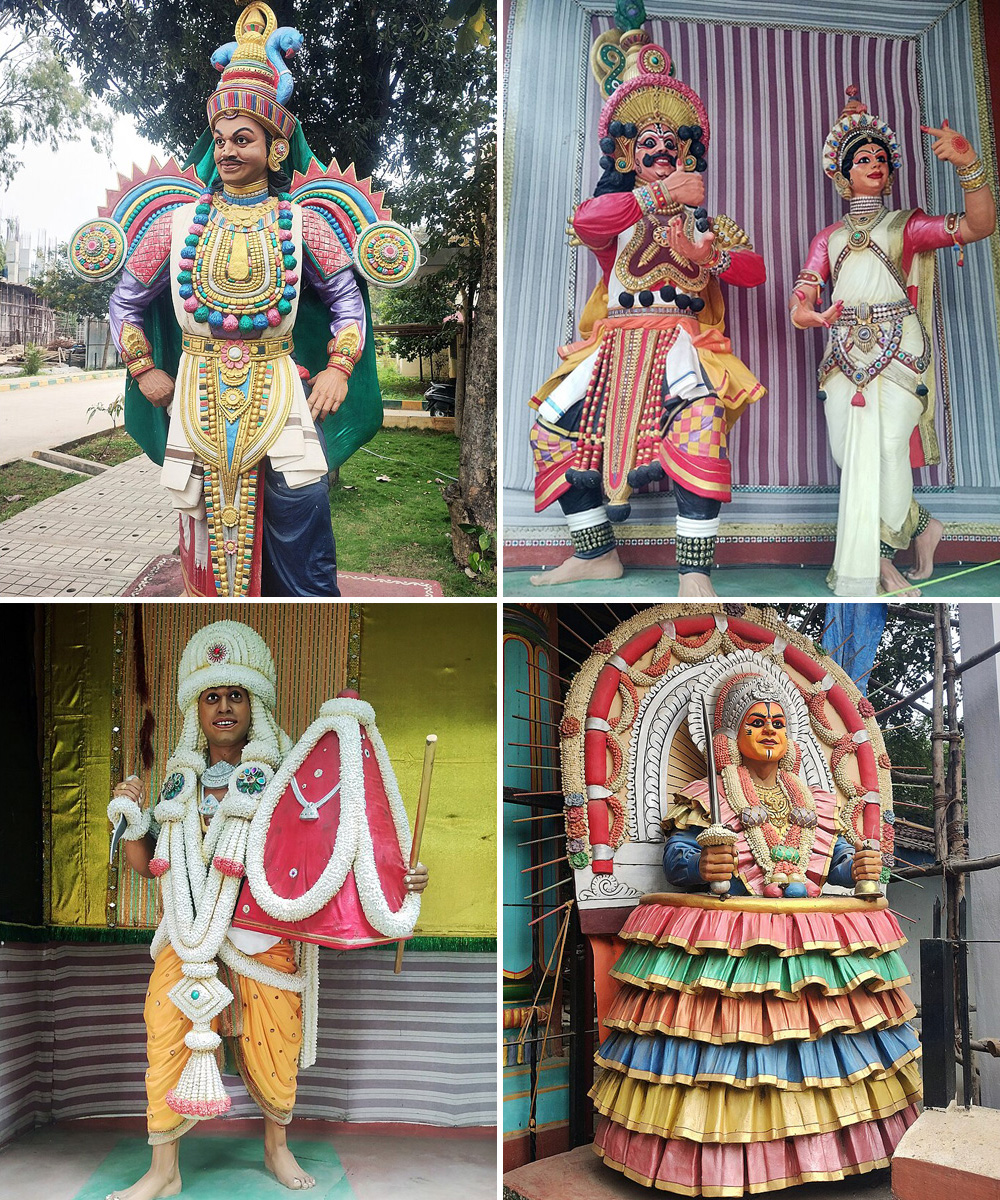
- Sculptures of Rangoli Gardens in 2024
- Established: 27 March 2018
- Location: Inside Mahatma Gandhi Institute of Rural Energy and Development, Srirampura Cross, Rachenahalli, Jakkuru, Bengaluru, Karnataka 560064
- Coordinates: 13.067542921940657°N 77.61069175912543°E
- Type: Model arts heritage village
- Collections: Sculptures
- Collection size: 1000+
- Owner: Government of Karnataka
- Website: rangoligardens.in

Rangoli Gardens is a model arts heritage village, located in Jakkur, Bangalore. Rangoli Gardens documents how rural people of Karnataka lived, 100 to 200 years ago. This village exhibits more than 1,000 life-size sculptures.

== Media gallery ==
Rangoli Gardens in 2024
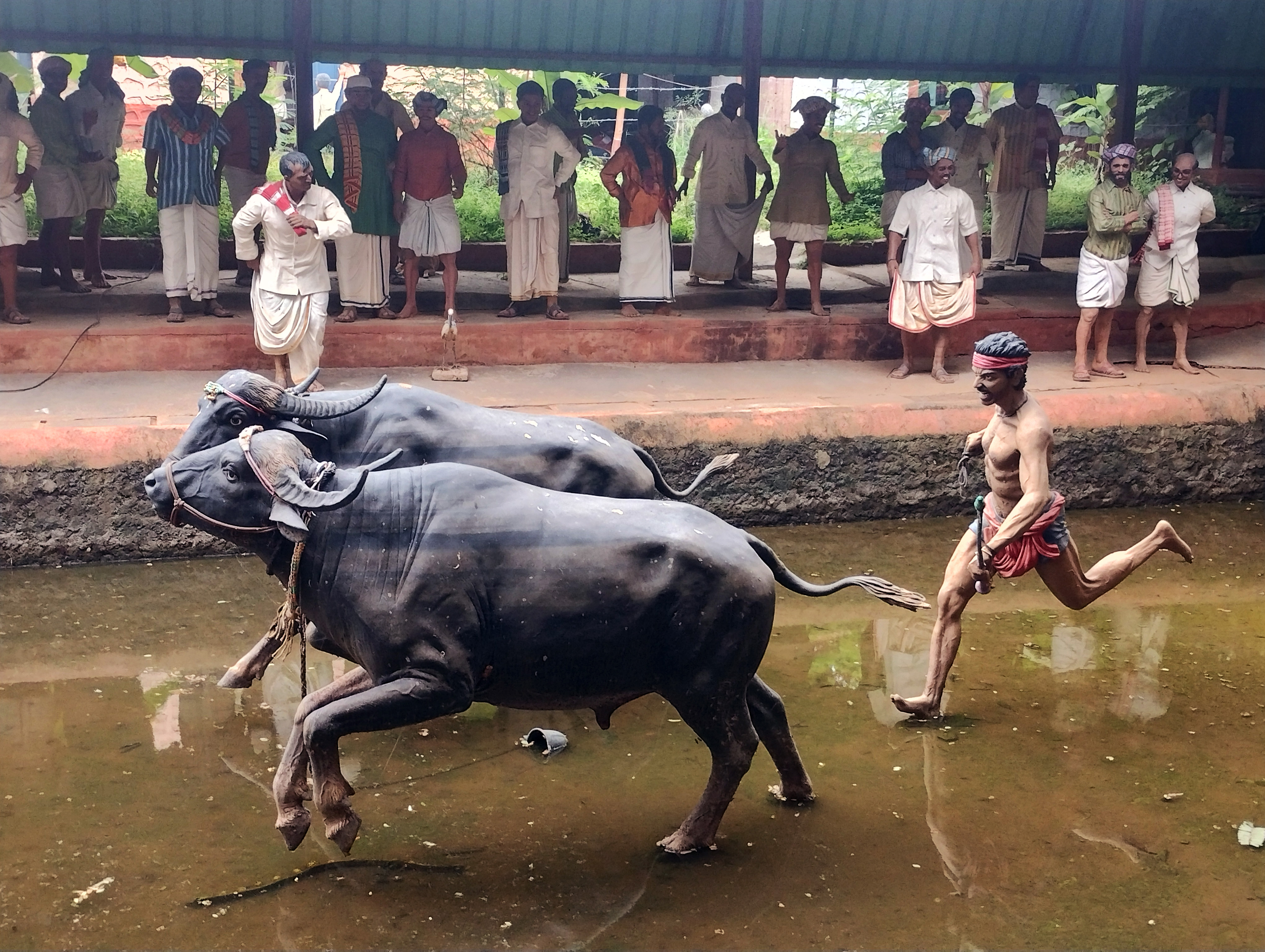

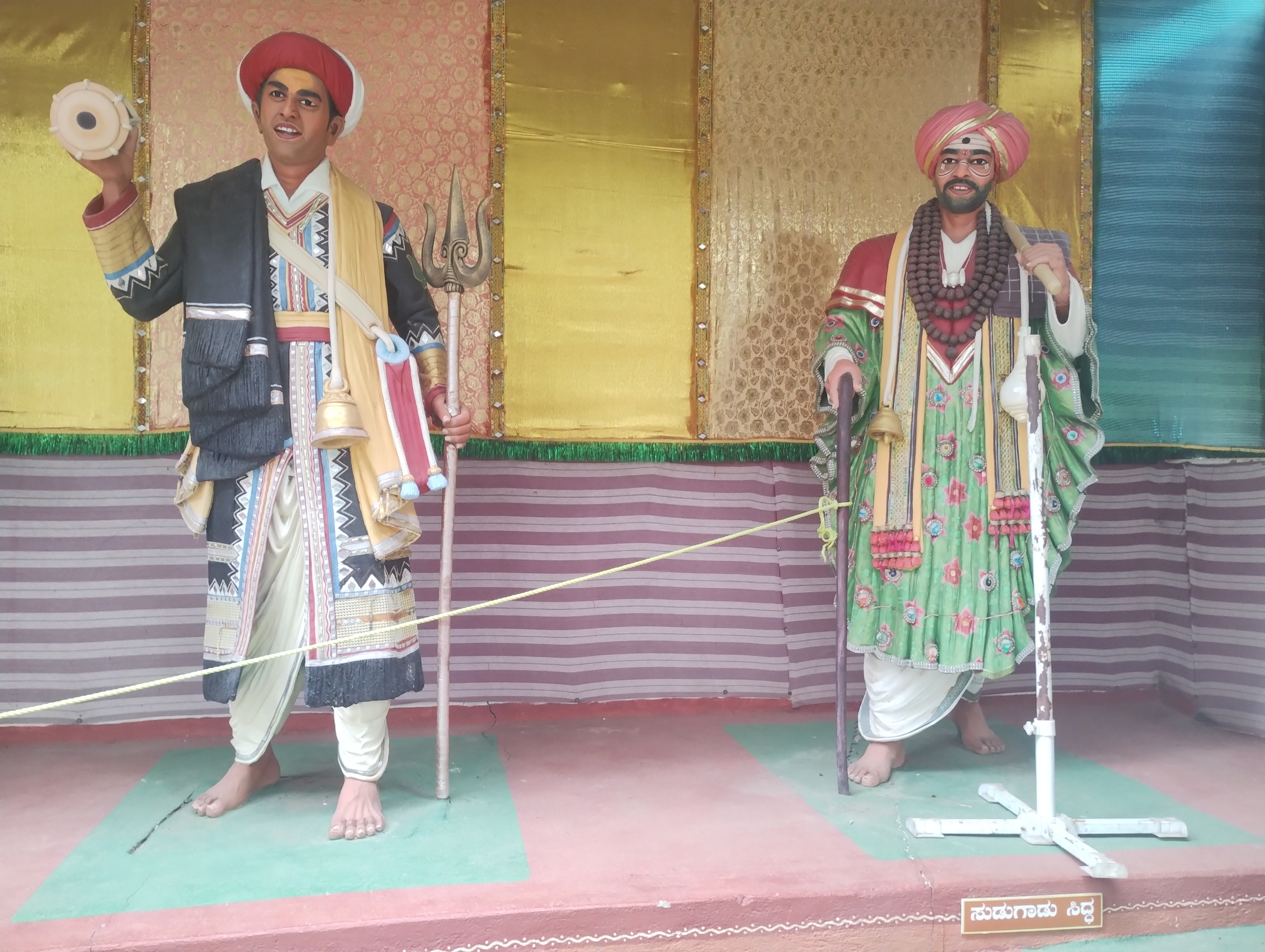

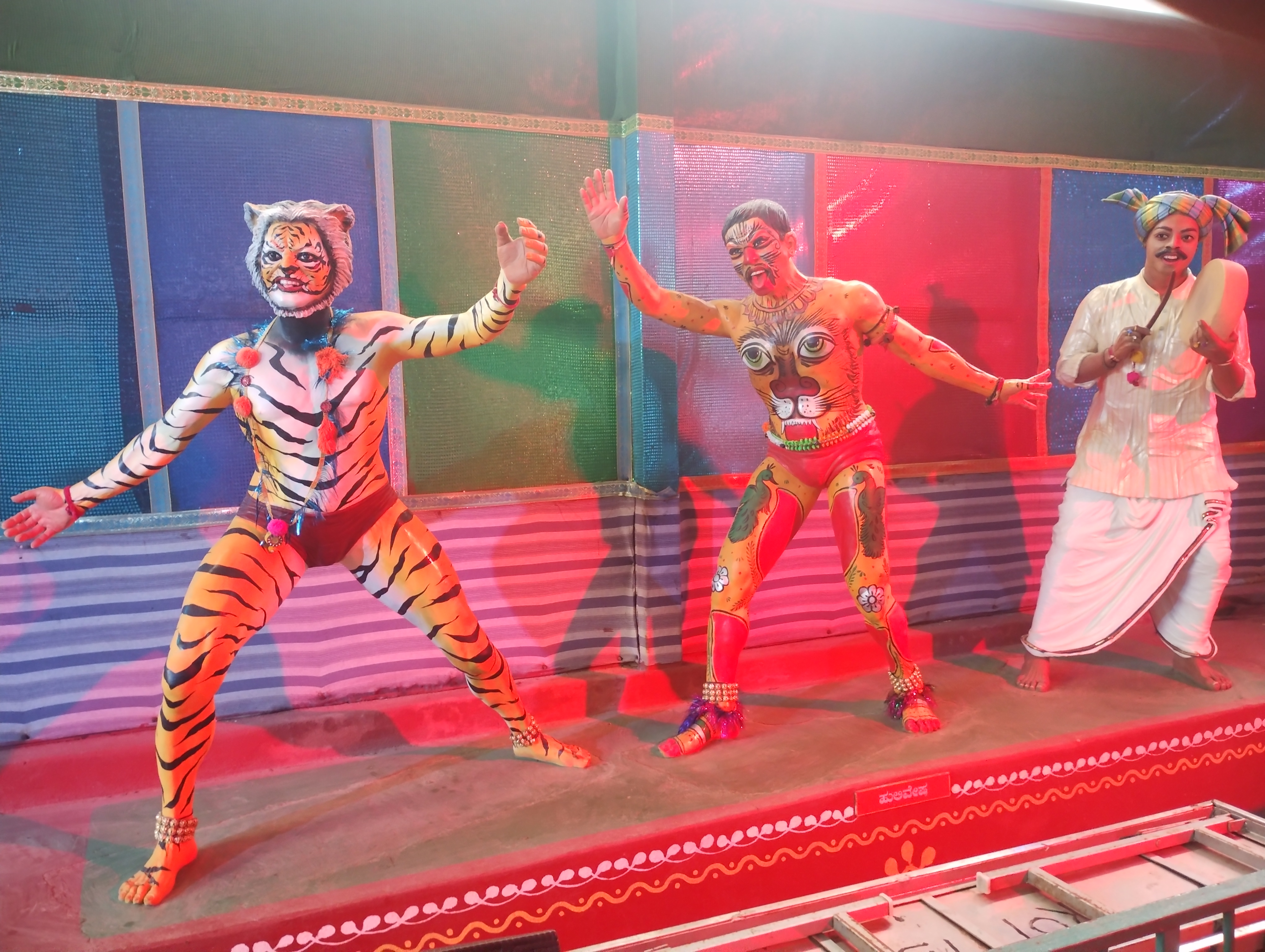

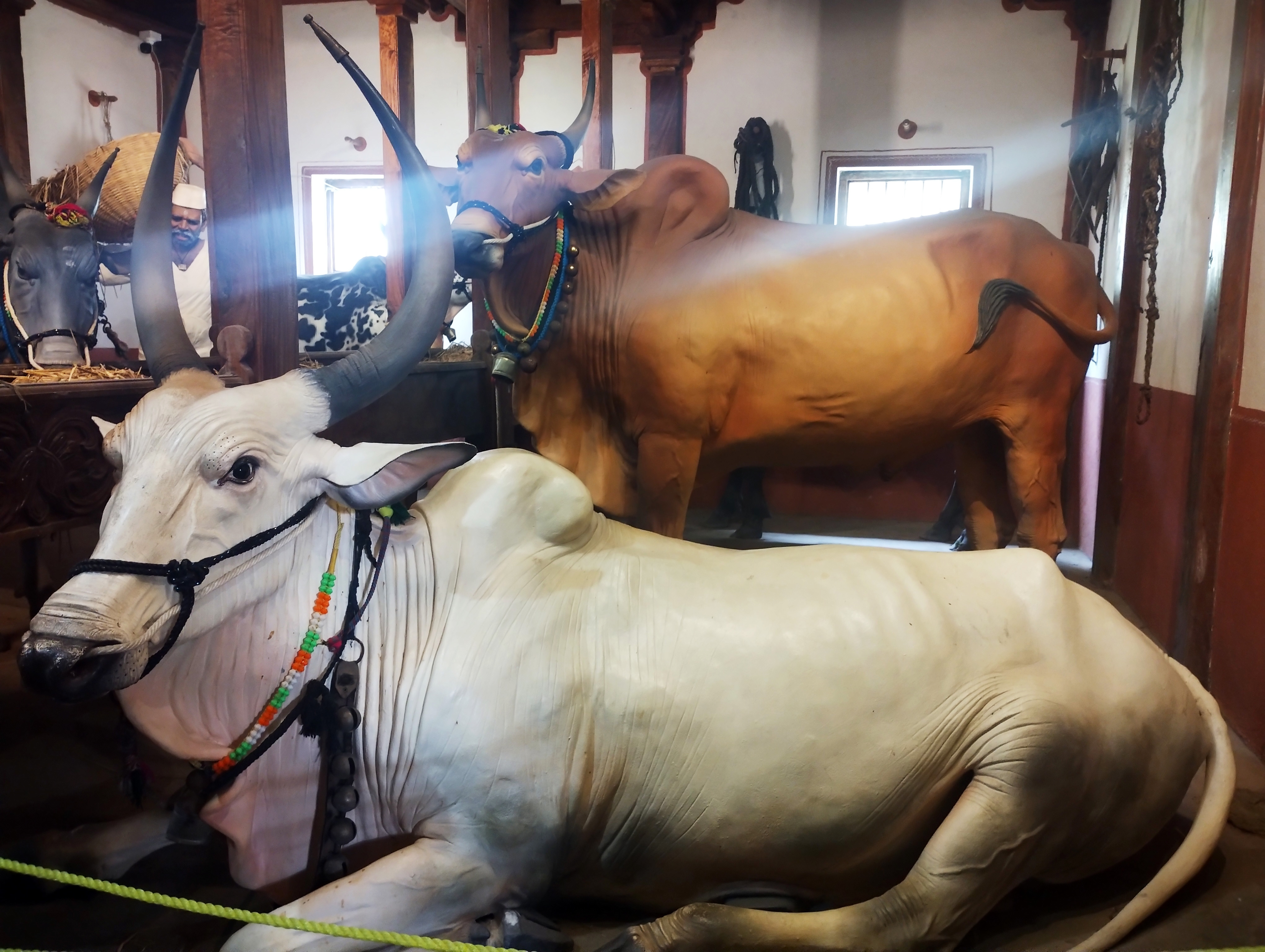

== See also ==
- Rangoli
- Art and culture of Karnataka
