= Kumar Gandharva =

Indian classical singer (1924–1992)

Pt. Kumar Gandharva
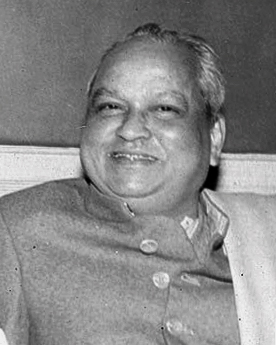
- Kumar Gandharva

Background information
- Born: Shivaputra Siddharamayya Komkalimath; 8 April 1924; Sulebhavi, Belgaum District, Karnataka, India
- Died: 12 January 1992 (aged 67) Dewas, India
- Genre: Indian classical music
- Occupation: Singer
- Years active: 1934–1992
- Spouse(s): Bhanumati Kans ( married 1947-1961), Vasundhara Komkali (married 1962-1992)
- Award: Padma Bhushan Padma Vibhushan

Pandit Kumar Gandharva (pronunciation: [kumaːɾ ɡən̪d̪ʱəɾʋə], Kn: ಕುಮಾರ್ ಗಂಧರ್ವ; 8 April 1924 – 12 January 1992), originally known as Shivaputra Siddharamayya Komkalimath was an Indian classical singer, well known for his unique vocal style and for his refusal to be bound by the tradition of any gharana. Kumar Gandharva is in fact a title given to him when he was a child prodigy; a Gandharva is a musical spirit in Hindu mythology.

== Early life and education ==
Gandharva was born in Sulebhavi near Belgaum, Karnataka, India in a Kannada-speaking Lingayat family. By the age of five, he had already shown signs of being a musical prodigy and first appeared on stage at the age of 10. When he was 11, his father sent him to study music under the well-known classical teacher, B.R. Deodhar. His mastery of technique and musical knowledge was so rapid that Gandharva himself was teaching at the school before he had turned 20. By his early 20s, Gandharva was seen as a star of music and was praised by critics.

== Career ==
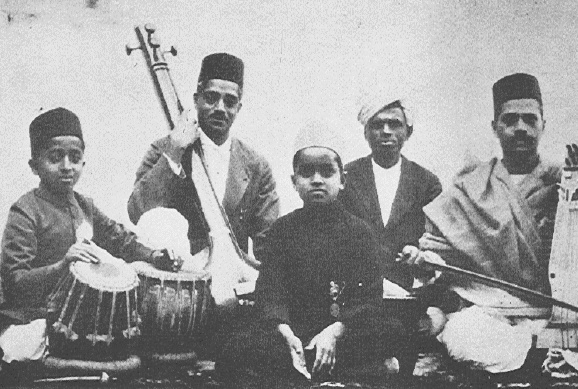
Kumar Gandharva in concert at a young age

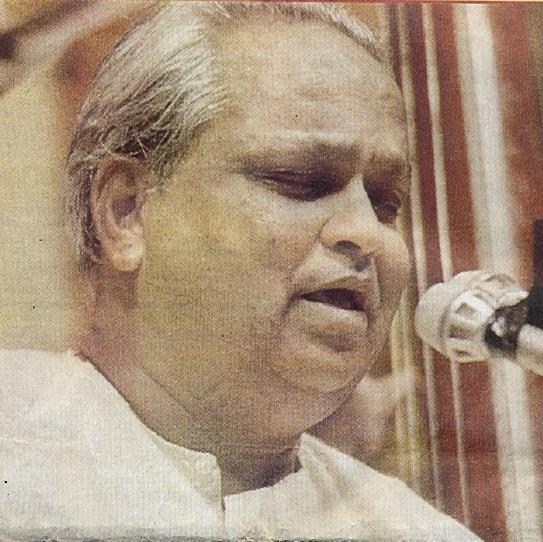
Kumar Gandharva in concert.

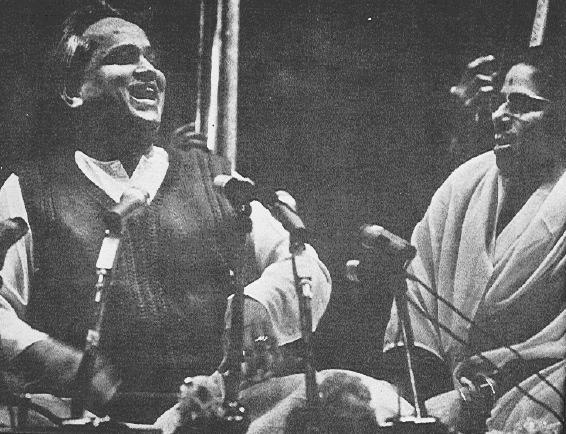
Kumar Gandharva with his second wife Vasundhara Komkali at a concert

In the late 40s, he was stricken with tuberculosis and was told by doctors that he would never sing again. He was advised to move to the drier climate of Dewas, Madhya Pradesh for his health. For the next six years, Gandharva endured a period of illness and silence. Doctors told him that trying to sing could be fatal and that there was little hope of recovery. Stories of Gandharva in this period depict a man lying in bed and listening to the sounds of nature around him: birds, the wind, and passing street singers. They also detail how he would hum to himself, almost inaudibly. Hess speculates that this was the beginning of Gandharva's radical new conception of the nirguni bhajan, which celebrates a formless (nirguna) divinity.

In 1952, streptomycin emerged as a treatment for tuberculosis, and Gandharva began to take it. Gradually, helped by excellent medical support and care from wife Bhanumati, he recovered and began singing again. However, his voice and singing style would always bear the scars of his illness: one of his lungs had been rendered useless, so he had to adapt to singing with a single lung.

His first post-recovery concert took place in 1953. The illness greatly affected Gandharva's singing in later years – he was to be known for powerful short phrases and his very high voice.

Gandharva also experimented with other forms of singing such as Nirguni bhajans (devotional songs), folk songs, and with both ragas and presentation, often going from fast to slow compositions in the same raga. He is remembered for his great legacy of innovation, questioning tradition without rejecting it outright, resulting in music in touch with the roots of Indian culture, especially the folk music of Madhya Pradesh. His innovative approach towards music led to the creation of new ragas from combinations of older ragas.

His style of singing attracted considerable controversy. Veteran singer Mogubai Kurdikar did not consider his vilambit (slow tempo) singing interesting and his own teacher, Deodhar, criticized some aspects of Gandharva's singing, but their relationship was strained from the 1940s when Gandharva married Bhanumati. According to Pandharinath Kolhapure's book on Gandharva, Deodhar was against the match. But, the criticism mostly centered on his vilambit gayaki. His singing in faster tempos, particularly his mastery over Madhya-laya, was widely revered.

Vasundhara Komkali, Gandharva's second wife and also his student, formed a memorable duo with him in bhajan singing. Sometimes, she provided vocal support to his classical renditions. Their daughter, Kalapini Komkalimath, would later accompany both her parents on tanpura.

Some of Gandharva's musical philosophy is carried forward by his son Mukul Shivputra and daughter, as well as by students such as Madhup Mudgal, Vijay Sardeshmukh, and Satyasheel Deshpande. The Kumar Gandharva Foundation (Mumbai), formed by his student Paramanand Yadav, promotes the development of Hindustani music and Carnatic music. Gandharva's grandson Bhuvanesh (Mukul's son) has also made a name for himself as a classical singer.

For a long spell, Gandharva's activities as a musician were managed by his friend and tabla accompanist Vasant Acharekar. Acharekar was Vasant Desai's assistant in the 1950s but later devoted himself fully to his role as an accompanist to classical singing until his death in the late 1970s. Gandharva had friendly relations with the noted Marathi literary couple Pu La Deshpande and Sunita Deshpande.

Gandharva was a musicologist as well. During his illness, when he was advised complete rest, he spent time contemplating different aspects of music. He had his own thoughts about many different ragas, styles of rendition, and different types of composition.

Gandharva was awarded the Padma Bhushan in 1977 and India's second-highest civilian honour, the Padma Vibhushan in 1990.

== Personal life ==
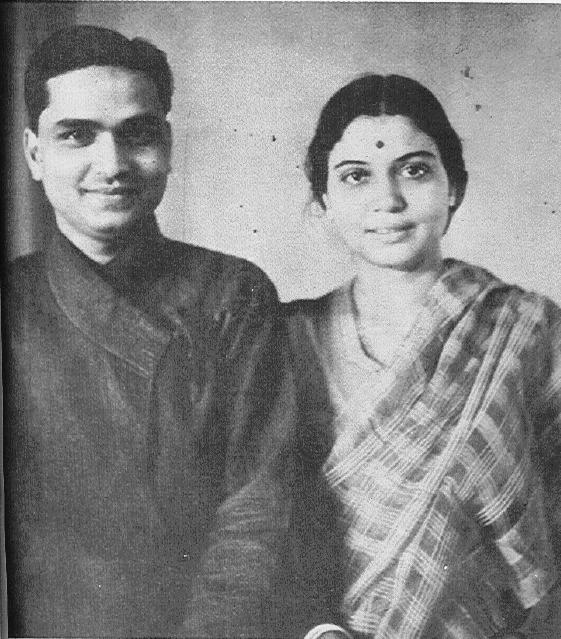
Gandharva and Bhanumati Kans

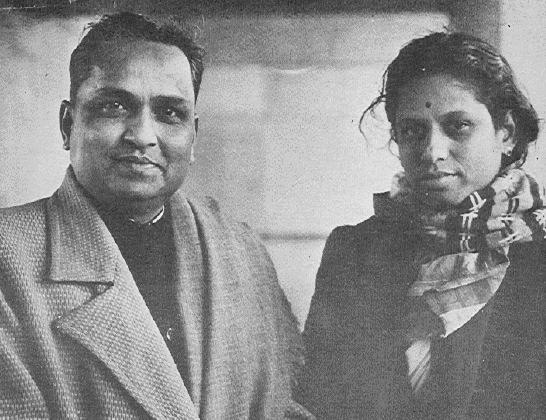
Kumar Gandharva and Vasundhara Komkali (Shrikhande)

Gandharva married Bhanumati Kans in 1947. She had enrolled as a student in B.R Deodhar's school, and Gandharva was assigned as her teacher. The two fell in love, got married, and moved to Dewas in 1947. Soon after the move, Gandharva was stricken with tuberculosis, but with the help of new medicines, dedicated doctors, and Bhanumati's nursing, he recovered.

Gandharva's first son, Mukul Shivputra, was born in 1956. Their second son, Yashowardhan, was born in 1961 but Bhanumati died during the child-birth.

Soon after her death, Gandharva married Vasundhara Shrikhande (1931–2015), another of his fellow-students at Deodhar's school. Their daughter, Kalapini Komkali, is a noted vocalist.

== Death ==
Gandharva died on 12 January 1992, at his Dewas residence, Madhya Pradesh after a long history of lung infection ailment for decades. He was cremated with full state honors and his funeral was attended by hundreds of music lovers from all over the country.

== In popular culture ==
The Rashtriya Kumar Gandharva Samman was established by the government of Madhya Pradesh in 1992 as an annual national honour presented to outstanding talent in the field of music.

The last in the series of four movies in the Kabir Project by Shabnam Virmani features the life of Gandharva and his disciples, his career, and his journey into "Nirgun" singing. His song 'Sunta Hai' forms the title of the movie 'Koi Sunta Hai'.

'Hans Akela' is a 78 minutes documentary on Kumar Gandharva made by Films Division of the Government of India, with interviews with various people – wife, friends, students.

'Mukkam Vashi' is a book made on notes collected during a two-day workshop of the same name. It collected together the thoughts of Gandharva on the nature of music at a fundamental level.

== Legacy ==
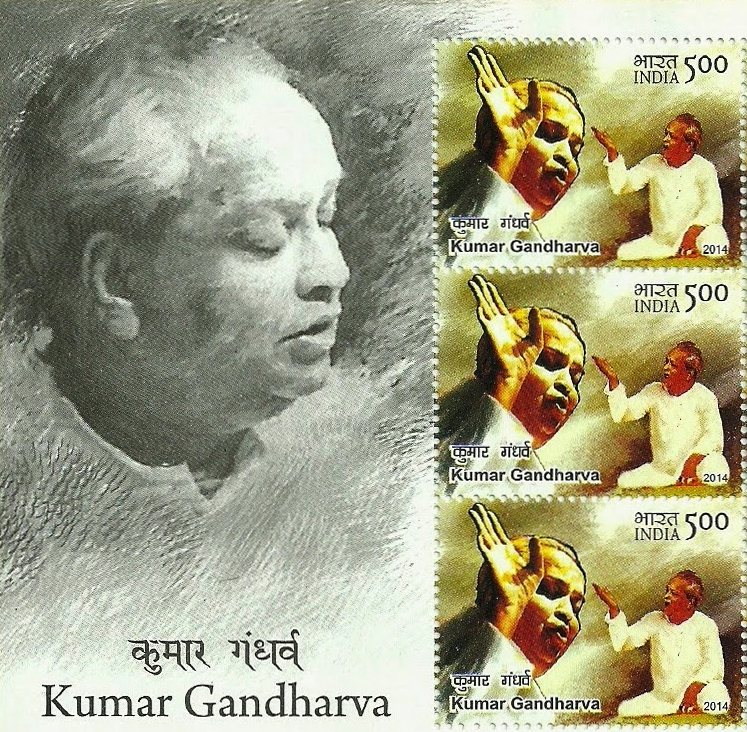
Kumar Gandharva, 2014 stampsheet of India

In September 2014, a postage stamp featuring Gandharva was released by India Post commemorating his contributions to Hindustani music.

== Bibliography ==
- Raghava R. Menon; Avinash Pasricha (2001). The Musical Journey of Kumar Gandharva. Vision Books. ISBN 978-81-7094-475-1.
- Hess, Linda (2009). Singing Emptiness: Kumar Gandharva performs the poetry of Kabir. Seagull Books.
- Vamana Hari Deshapande (1989). Between Two Tanpuras. Popular Prakashan. pp. 70–84. ISBN 978-0-86132-226-8.
