= Shubhendra Rao =

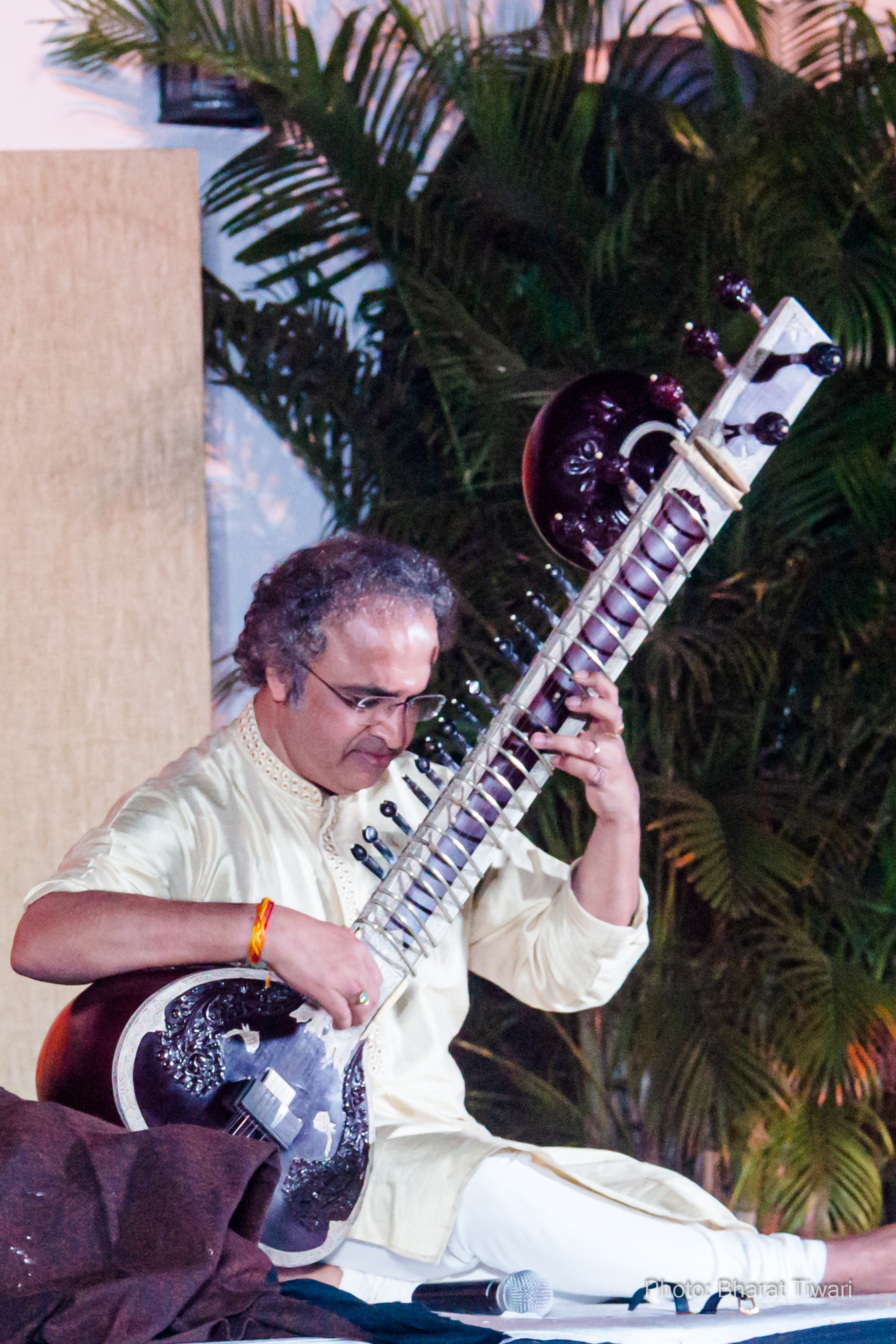
- Shubhendra Rao performing at the residence of Brazilian Ambassador to India

Background information
- Born: Karnataka, India
- Genre: Indian Classical
- Occupation: Musician
- Instruments: Sitar, Vocals, Harmonium, Tanpura, Piano
- Years active: 1987–present
- Website: shubhendrarao.com

Subhendra Rao is an Indian composer and sitar player. He is a classical musician as well as a collaborator working with musicians from different genres across the world. He has performed at venues and festivals such as the Kennedy Center, Carnegie Hall, Broadway, the Sydney Opera House, the National Arts Festival, the Théâtre de la Ville, the Dover Lane Music Conference, and St. Xavier's College Ahmedabad. A protégé of Ravi Shankar, he is acknowledged by critics and connoisseurs alike as a worthy successor to his teacher's tradition.

== Early life ==
Shubhendra Rao was born on 26 November 1964 in Mysore city in the state of Karnataka in Southern India. His father, N. R. Rama Rao (who was one of the earliest and closest disciples of Ravi Shankar) initiated him into the intricacies of the sitar. His mother, Nagaratna, is a trained saraswati veena player. His sister, Sadhana Jayaram, also plays the sitar and is now currently teaching students at Sathya Sai Loka Seva Institutions, Muddenahalli.

At the age of seven, Rao took his first lesson from Ravi Shankar and continued to visit Shankar in different cities in India to pursue his musical education. In 1984, at the insistence of his teacher, Shubhendra moved to Delhi to live with and learn from him in the true guru-shishya tradition. The years that followed were a period of introspective and creative metamorphosis. He tried to build in a discipline within himself, practicing from anything between ten and twelve hours every day. His teacher nurtured his talent, giving him deep insights into what it entailed to become a complete artist.

=== Performing with and assisting Ravi Shankar ===
An important part of his learning was assisting his teacher in solo concerts and orchestras. As an 18-year-old in 1983, he performed on stage for the first time with his Guru in ‘Uday Utsav’ in New Delhi. In 1988, he assisted and performed in the orchestra ‘Live in Kremlin’ in Russia that has been released as a CD. In 1989 and 1990, he toured with the production ‘Ghanashyam’ in the UK and India. His first concert assisting Shankar in his solo concert was in February 1985 in New Delhi. Between 1985 and 1995, he performed with Shankar at numerous concerts all over the world, continuing to assist him in all his creative productions.

== Career ==
In 1987, Shubhendra gave his first solo concert in Bangalore. Shubhendra has performed venues including Carnegie Hall and on Broadway in New York, John F. Kennedy Center for the Performing Arts in Washington DC, Walker Arts Center in Minneapolis, Des Moines Arts Center, Maui Arts and Cultural Center in Hawaii, Sydney Opera House in Sydney, Edinburgh Festivals in Scotland, at the Theatre de la Ville in Paris, WOMAD festival in Guernsey England, National Arts Festival in South Africa, Fajr International Music Festival in Tehran, Esplanade in Singapore among others. In India, Shubhendra has performed at major music festivals including Dover Lane Music Conference, the ITC Music Conference in Kolkata, Baba Harballabh Sangeet Mahasabha in Jullundhar, Shankarlal Festival and Gunidas Sammelan in New Delhi, SAPTAK Festival in Ahmedabad, and Vasantahabba Festival in Bangalore.

A regular performer on Radio and the National Television, he holds a ‘Grade A’ status on the All India Radio roster. He is impaneled by the Indian Council for Cultural Relations (ICCR) both as a performer as well as a Guru.

He has also been invited as a guest teacher to give 'lecture-demonstrations' about Indian music by leading universities all over the world. Some universities include Peabody Conservatory of Music, Duke University, Yale University, University of Sacramento, Lewis and Clark College, University of Minneapolis, Winona State University, and the University of Nebraska–Lincoln.

In November 2007, he was awarded the "Youth Icon for Classical Music" by Zee TV. Shubhendra Rao & Saskia Rao were also honoured with the "Delhi Ratna" award by the Art and Cultural Trust of India in December 2014.

== Collaborations ==
Shubhendra Rao has collaborated with musicians from a variety of musical traditions and genres. Among the artists he has worked with are pipa player Gao Hong, guitarist Nguyen Lê, guitarist Freddie Bryant, singer Ryoko Moriyama, flautist James Newton, taar player Ciavash Borhani, and kamancha player Samer Habibi. He has also frequently collaborated with his wife, cellist Saskia Rao-de Haas.

== Compositions ==
- In August 2008, India's premier Television Network, NDTV commissioned Shubhendra and Saskia to compose and perform a musical tribute to celebrate India's 61st Independence Day. This celebration had more than 90,000 hits on MSN India in just three days.
- Composed for the production, "From Temple to Theatre", Minneapolis based Ragamala Dance production.
- Composed the music with Saskia Rao-de Haas for "When Gods meet", Padma Vibhushan Dr. Sonal Mansingh's production.
- For the 50th anniversary of the Spanish founder Father Vicente Ferrer in 2009, Shubhendra and Saskia composed a vibrant piece in the presence of the Spanish vice-president, illustrating the connection between his land of birth and India.
- "Yathra" which means 'journey' is the title of a composition that they created for Ragamala Dance, Minneapolis, US in 2008 and 2011. Yathra evokes an abstract expression of the cycle of life in a day, metaphorically tracing a human being's journey from the dawn of birth to the twilight of life.
- "The Red Flower" (2011) is a musical dialogue based on the conversation that took place between Rabindranath Tagore and Albert Einstein regarding the perception of music by different individuals. It was through a fine weave of two seemingly different paradigms of culture and music that Shubhendra and Saskia chose to present this innovative concept.
- "Vesaal" (2011) is the collaboration between Shubhendra and Saskia with the Iranian musicians Ciavash Borhani on Tar, Samir Habibi on Kemanche and Fakkhrudin Ghaffari on Tombak, Duf exploring the cross points of Indian and Persian Classical music.
- "Unity of Faith" is a work commissioned in 2008 in honour of the international conference by the same name. Shubhendra and Saskia composed music to prayers and spiritual texts from different religions showing the effect that music can have on any seeker of spiritual enlightenment from any background bringing together a world music ensemble.

== Discography ==
- Fulfilment—Solo recording of Raga Lalit and Raga Maru Bihag.
- Raga Marwa—Released by India Music Archives, New York
- Journey Together—Duet with Sarod player Partho Sarathy—Raga Patdeep and Raga Charukesi.
- Creating Waves—Duet with Saskia Rao-de Haas released by Rhyme Records, Kansas City
- Ancient Weaves—Duet with Sarod player, Partho Sarathy—Raga Charukauns and Raga Manj Khamaj
- New Offerings of Ravi Shankar—recorded Raga Tilak Shyam with his Guru, Pandit Ravi Shankar in 1983.
- Flying Dragon—Composed and performed with Pipa maestro, Gao Hong.

== Teacher ==
Rao is amongst the last of his generation learning under the age-old 'Guru-Shishya parampara', which Shubhendra continues to teach. As an impaneled Guru of the Indian Council for Cultural Relations, many students from all over the world learn from him. Some of them stay for 6–8 years at a stretch, some spend a few months every year with him, and others continue to learn from him year round.

== Shubhendra and Saskia Rao Foundation ==
The Shubhendra & Saskia Rao Foundation is a nonprofit organization which has the mission statement of "Music [being] every child's birthright!" The Foundation aims to help under privileged children to realize their full potential through music.

Their approach to music education in their specially developed curriculum for India: ‘Music4All: a Globalized music education to empower youth’. The Foundation is currently working with over 150 school children from the Nizamuddin Basti to empower them through music, conducts outreach programs for adults, teacher trainings and organizes random music events and concerts throughout the city.

== Personal life ==
Shubhendra Rao married Saskia Rao-de Haas on 3 February 2001. They have a son, Ishaan who is learning the piano and sitar.
