= Place Saint-Michel =

Public square in Paris, France

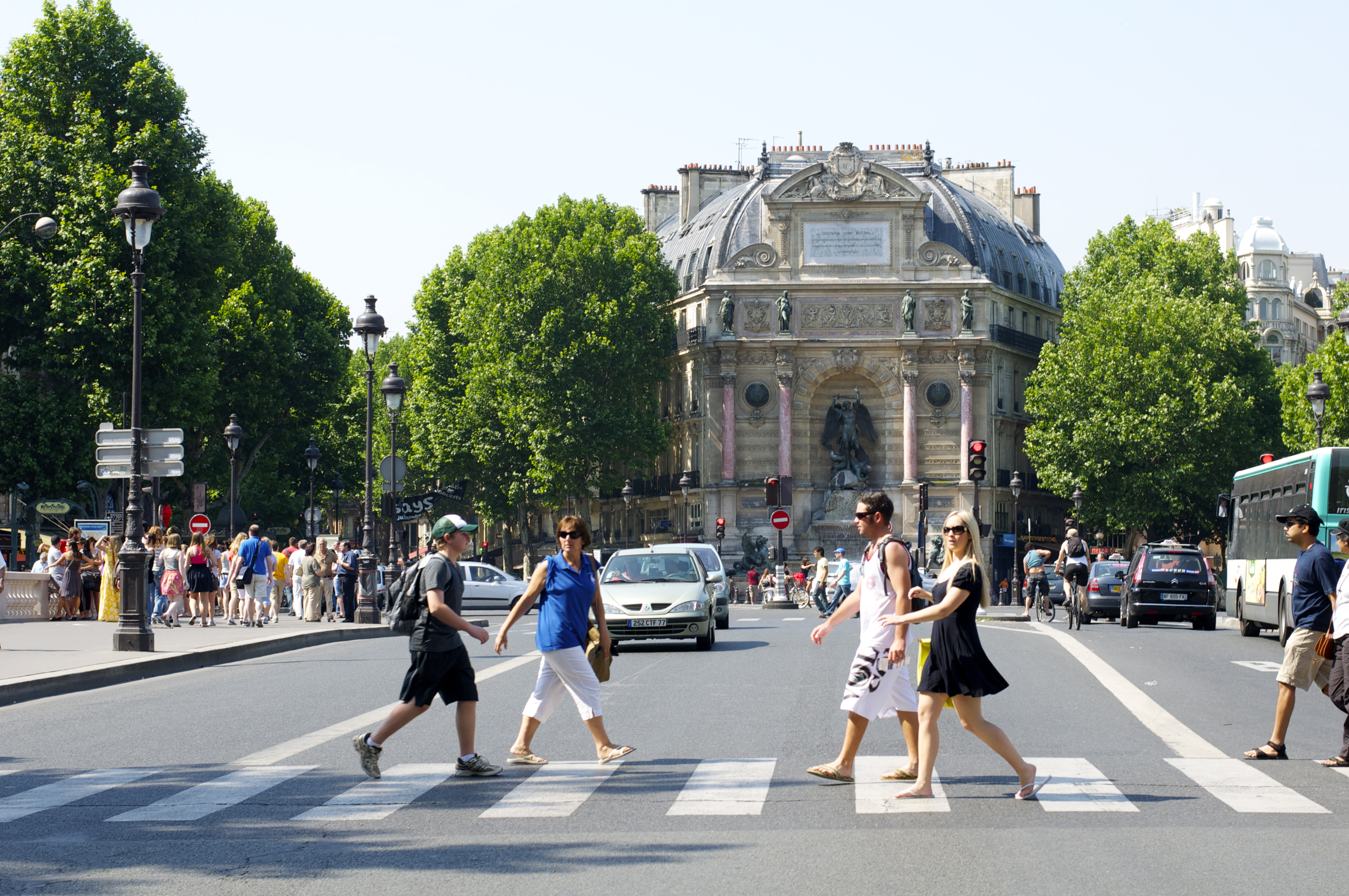
- The Place Saint-Michel and the Fontaine Saint-Michel

- Location within Paris
- Length: 140 m (460 ft)
- Width: 28 m (92 ft)
- Arrondissement: 5th, 6th
- Quarter: Latin Quarter
- Coordinates: 48°51′12″N 2°20′38″E

Construction
- Completion: 1855
- Denomination: Saint-Michel

The Place Saint-Michel (French pronunciation: [plas sɛ̃ miʃɛl]) is a public square in the Latin Quarter of Paris. It lies on the borderline between the 5th and 6th arrondissements, on the left bank of the river Seine. It faces the Île de la Cité, to which it is linked by the Pont Saint-Michel.

== Description ==
The northern end of the Place Saint-Michel, the end closer to the river, is on the left-bank side of the Pont Saint-Michel, which crosses sixty-two metres of water to reach the island, Île de la Cité. At this point, the Place Saint-Michel is formed by the convergence of four streets: two quais along the Seine, the Quai Saint-Michel and the Quai des Grands-Augustins, and the Boulevard Saint-Michel and the Rue Danton, which arrive at angles.

As one proceeds southward along the Rue Danton, addresses on either side of the street are 'Place Saint-Michel' addresses. This continues until one approaches the Rue Saint-André des Arts, which enters from the right, when the addresses become 'Place Saint-André des Arts' addresses. Only south of this square is the name 'Rue Danton' applied. So, one may suppose that the southern end of the Place Saint-Michel is on the street that becomes the Rue Danton, about sixty metres north of the intersection with the Rue Saint-André des Arts.

The Place Saint-Michel was enlarged, as part of Baron Haussmann's restructuring of Paris, to form a suitable bridgehead for the new, wider Pont Saint-Michel.

The square's location permits a view of some of the monuments of the Île de la Cité, including Sainte-Chapelle and the Palais de Justice.

== Monumental fountain ==
The Fontaine Saint-Michel (Saint Michael Fountain) was erected in 1860 on a design by Gabriel Davioud. Nine major sculptors participated. At one point during the design process, the fountain's central statue was supposed to depict Napoleon Bonaparte, but that came under criticism from opponents of Napoleon III; it was finally decided that the statue would be an image of Saint Michael the Archangel, with two dragons that spout water into the fountain and figures of the four classical cardinal virtues.

== Transport links ==
The Place Saint-Michel has entrances to two underground stations, which are linked below street level. Saint-Michel is on line 4 of the Paris Métro, whilst Saint-Michel-Notre-Dame is on line B and line C of the Paris Réseau Express Régional (RER).
