= Saskia Rao-de Haas =

Dutch musician

Saskia Rao-de Haas (born 1971) is a virtuoso cellist and composer from the Netherlands based in New Delhi, India. She is married to the sitarist Shubhendra Rao.

== Early life ==
Saskia was born in Abcoude, the Netherlands in a family of music lovers. Saskia studied cello under the Hungarian cellist Tibor de Machula and went on to do a Masters in Ethnomusicology from the University of Amsterdam and the Conservatory of Rotterdam where she studied under Hari Prasad Chaurasia and Koustuv Ray.

== Musical career ==
She first came to India in 1994 where she studied Indian music under Dr. Sumati Mutatkar at the Delhi University. Subsequently, she has also been tutored by Pandit D.K. Datar, Pandit Deepak Chowdhury and Pandit Shubhendra Rao.

Saskia Rao de Haas has performed at a number of traditional festivals, such as the Dover Lane Conference in Kolkata and the Harvallabh Sangeet Samelan in Jalandhar. She has also performed at the ‘Vasanta Habbha’ in Bangalore, the ‘Maihar’ festival and the ‘Haridas Sangeet Sammelan’ in Lucknow. She has also performed at numerous international venues including the Kennedy Center at Washington, D.C., and the Esplanande in Singapore. More recently in 2013 she also performed at various universities of UK including Oxford through the UK chapter of SPICMACAY. They are also scheduled to play at the Opening Ceremony of the Commonwealth Games at Glasgow in 2014.

== As a Composer ==
Saskia is acclaimed for bridging the Western and Indian classical music traditions. She is an accomplished Western classical cellist, plays folk music from Eastern Europe and has composed music for dance, film and theatre. Rao-de Haas composed music for the dance group Raga Mala and created an Indian string quartet in her piece 'Mukhani'. She developed, together with Shubhendra, a collection of pieces for sitar and cello with percussion under the collective name 'East marries West'.

== The Indian Cello ==
Saskia's contribution to Hindustani classical music through the Indian cello, an instrument fashioned out of the cello to enable it to be played in Indian classical concerts. The Indian Cello was fashioned by the violin maker Eduard van Tongeren with five playing strings and ten sympathetic strings. It is smaller in size than its western counterpart, thus enabling Saskia to sit on the floor while playing it. The addition of an extra playing string on a higher octave and the ten sympathetic strings further enriches the tonal quality of the Indian cello.

== Music education project ==
On August 13, 2014 the project Music: Every child's birthright was launched by the Shubhendra and Saskia Rao Foundation. The project includes a music education curriculum from nursery school up to high school level.

== Personal life ==
Saskia married sitarist Shubhendra Rao in 2001. They have a son, Ishaan and live in the C R Park locality of New Delhi.
