= Marie-Noémi Cadiot =

French sculptor

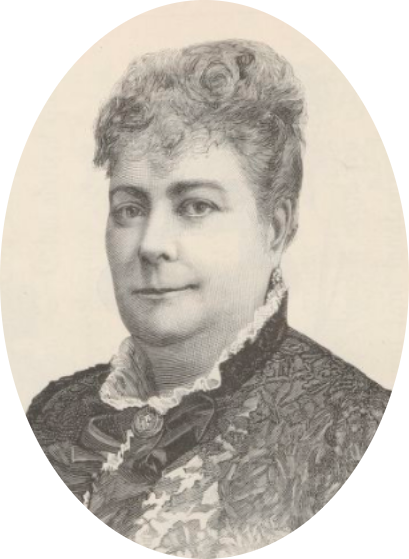
Noémi Cadiot in the 1880s

Marie-Noémi Cadiot (French: [maʁi noemi kadjo]; 12 December 1828, Paris – 10 April 1888, Saint-Jean-Cap-Ferrat), also known as Noémie Constant and by her literary pseudonyms Claude Vignon and H. Morel, was a French sculptor, journalist and writer of the 19th century.

== Biography ==
In 1846, while still a minor, Cadiot eloped with Alphonse Louis Constant, better known as occultist Eliphas Levi; her father, a government official, forced Constant to marry her. They had stillborn twins and a daughter, Mary, who died in 1854 at the age of seven years. Cadiot left Constant in the early 1850s for Marquis Alexandre de Montferrier, brother-in-law of Messianist philosopher Józef Maria Hoene-Wroński, and had the marriage annulled in 1865.

In the late 1850s, she had a liaison with architect Hector Lefuel, from which a son was born in 1859, whom she called Louis Vignon.

She remarried to politician Maurice Rouvier on 3 September 1872.

She died on 10 April 1888 in Saint-Jean-Cap-Ferrat and was buried at the Père Lachaise Cemetery in Paris.

== Sculpture ==
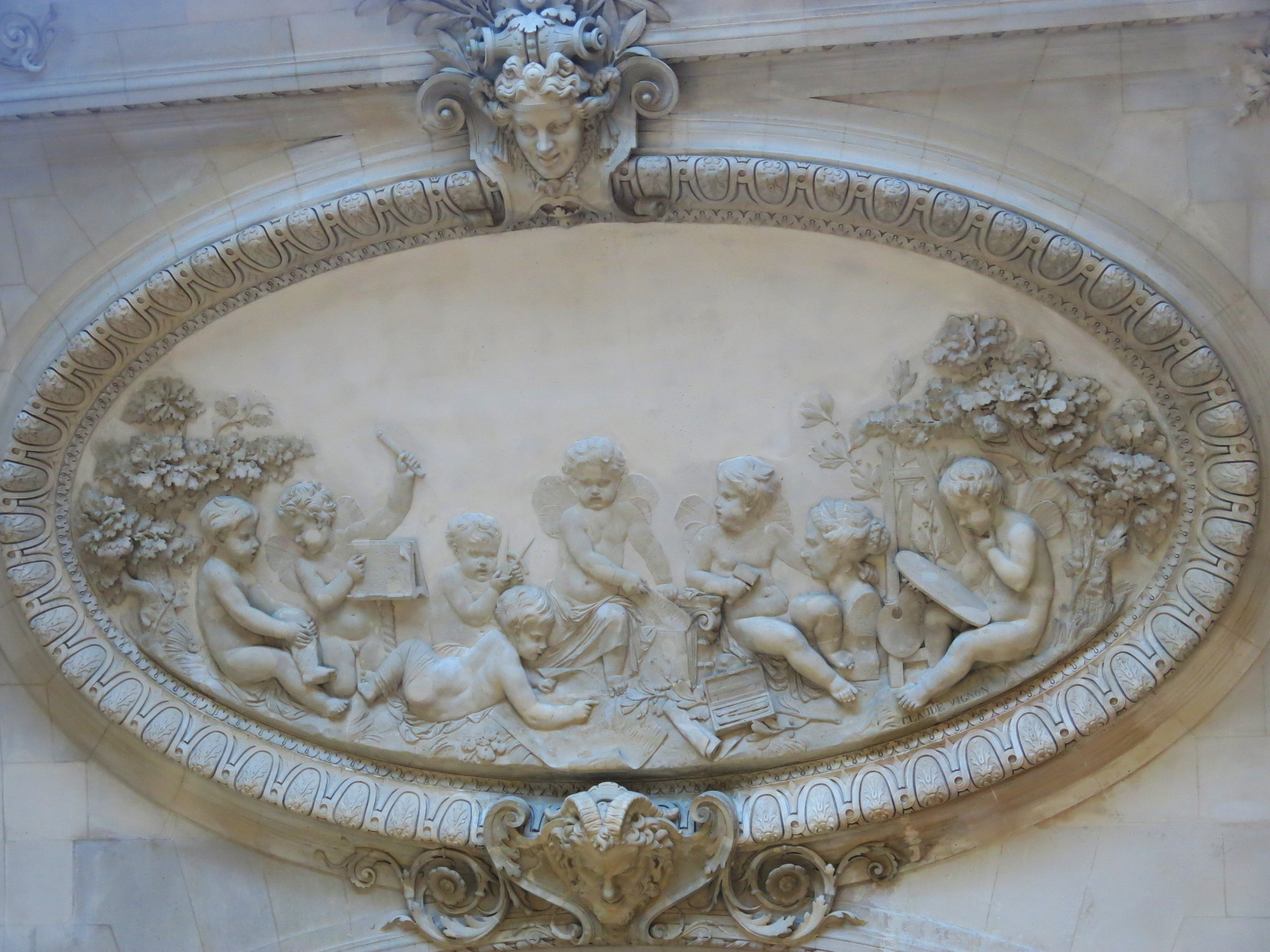
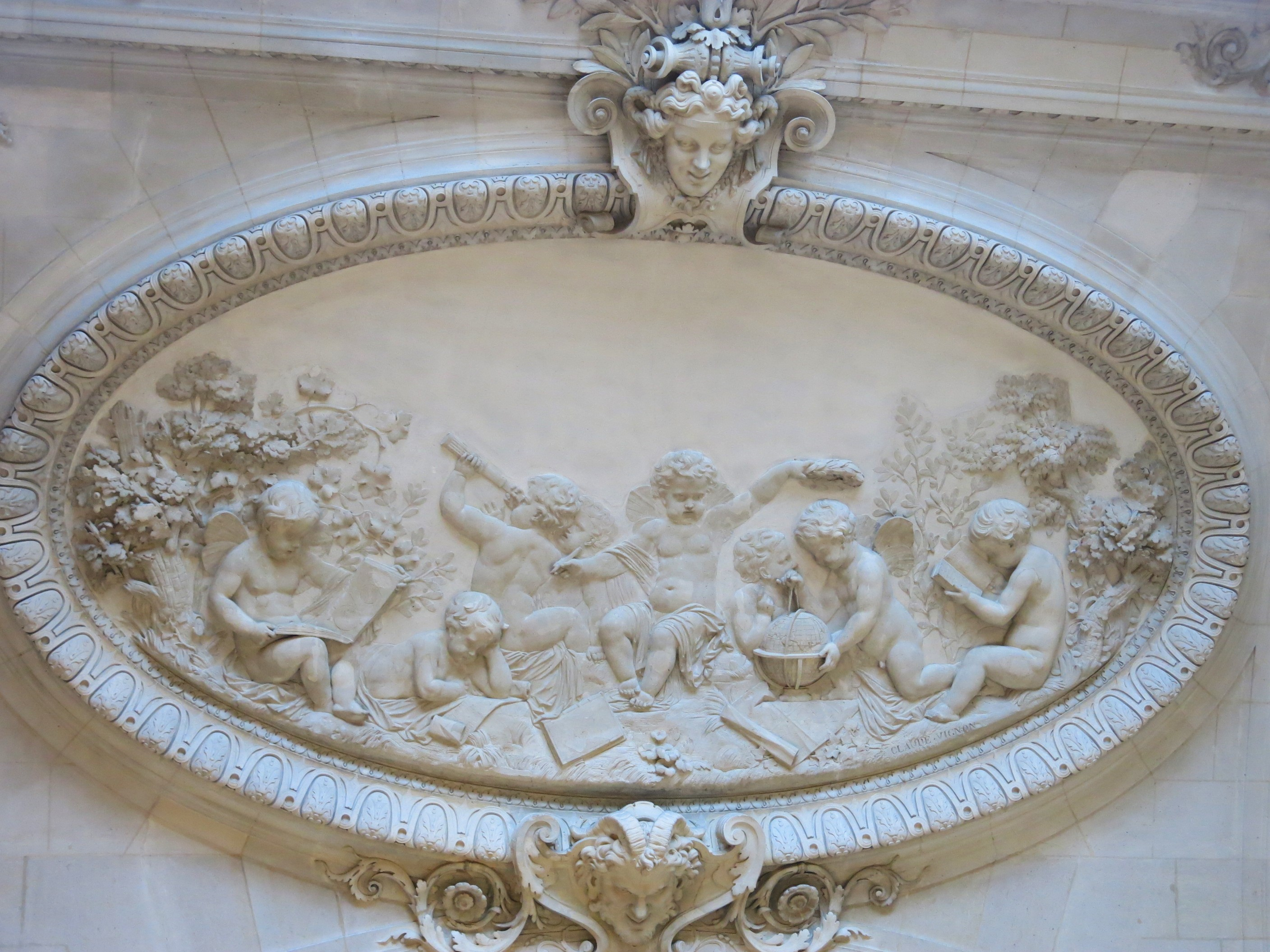
Arts and Sciences, Cadiot's reliefs in the Louvre Palace's escalier Lefuel

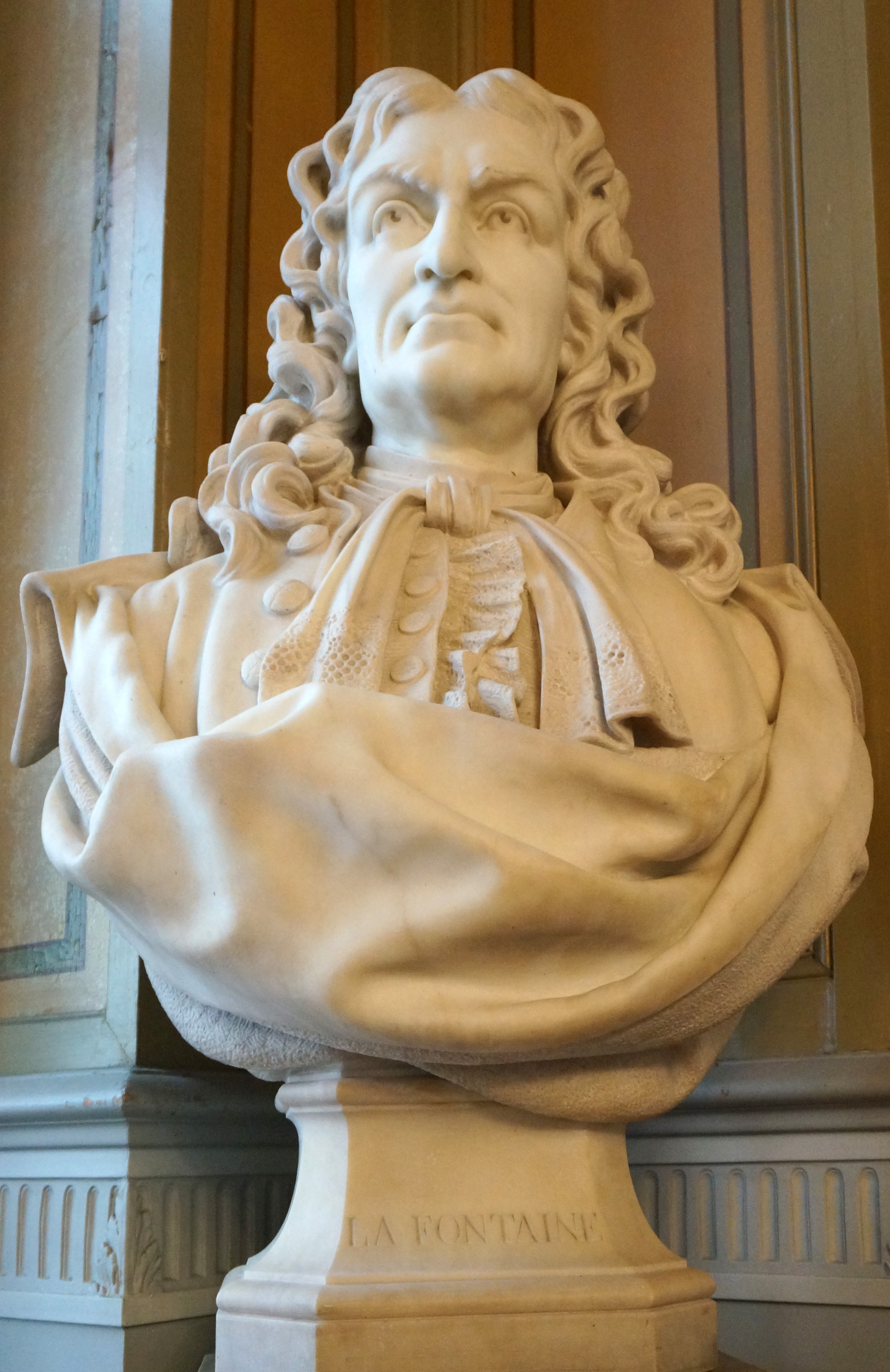
Bust of Jean de La Fontaine (1874), at Château-Thierry City Hall

Cadiot studied sculpture in the workshop of James Pradier. Her creations includes the decoration of the monumental staircase now known as the escalier Lefuel in Napoleon III's Louvre expansion, completed in 1859; and decorative reliefs added in 1862 or 1863 to the Fontaine Saint-Michel in Paris.

== Literary work ==
She attended Mrs Niboyet's Women's Club, and wrote in the Le Tintamarre and Le Moniteur du Soir soaps under the literary pseudonym of Claude Vignon (a character from a novel by Honoré de Balzac), which was formalised in 1866. She also published under the literary pseudonym of H. Morel.

Cadiot published Contes à faire peur in 1857, Un drame en province - La statue d'Apollon in 1863, Révoltée!, Un naufrage parisien in 1869, Château-Gaillard in 1874, and Victoire Normand in 1862.
