= Fontaine Saint-Michel =

Fountain in Paris, France

Coordinates: 48°51′11.32″N 2°20′37.32″E

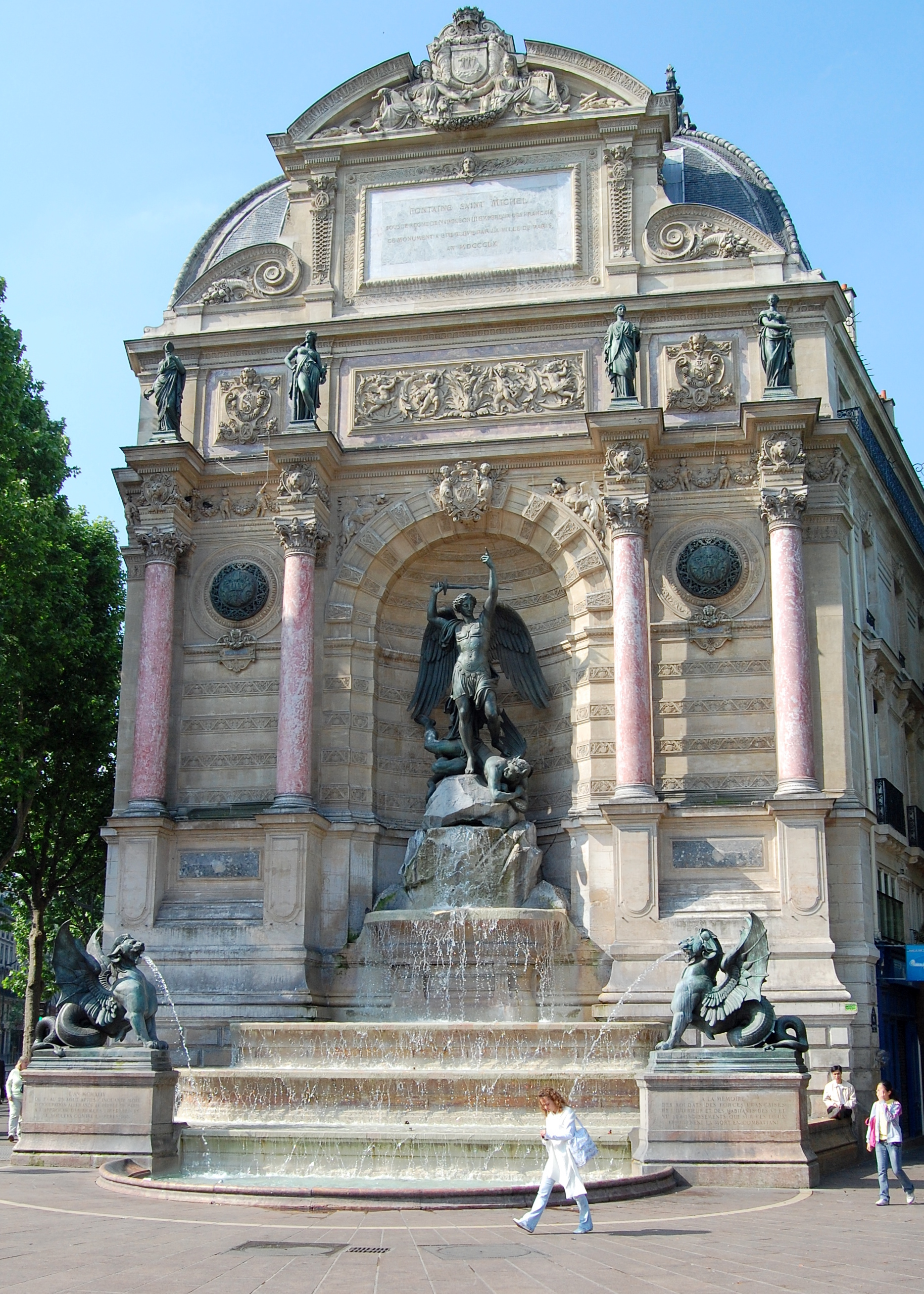
Fontaine Saint-Michel, Place Saint-Michel, Paris

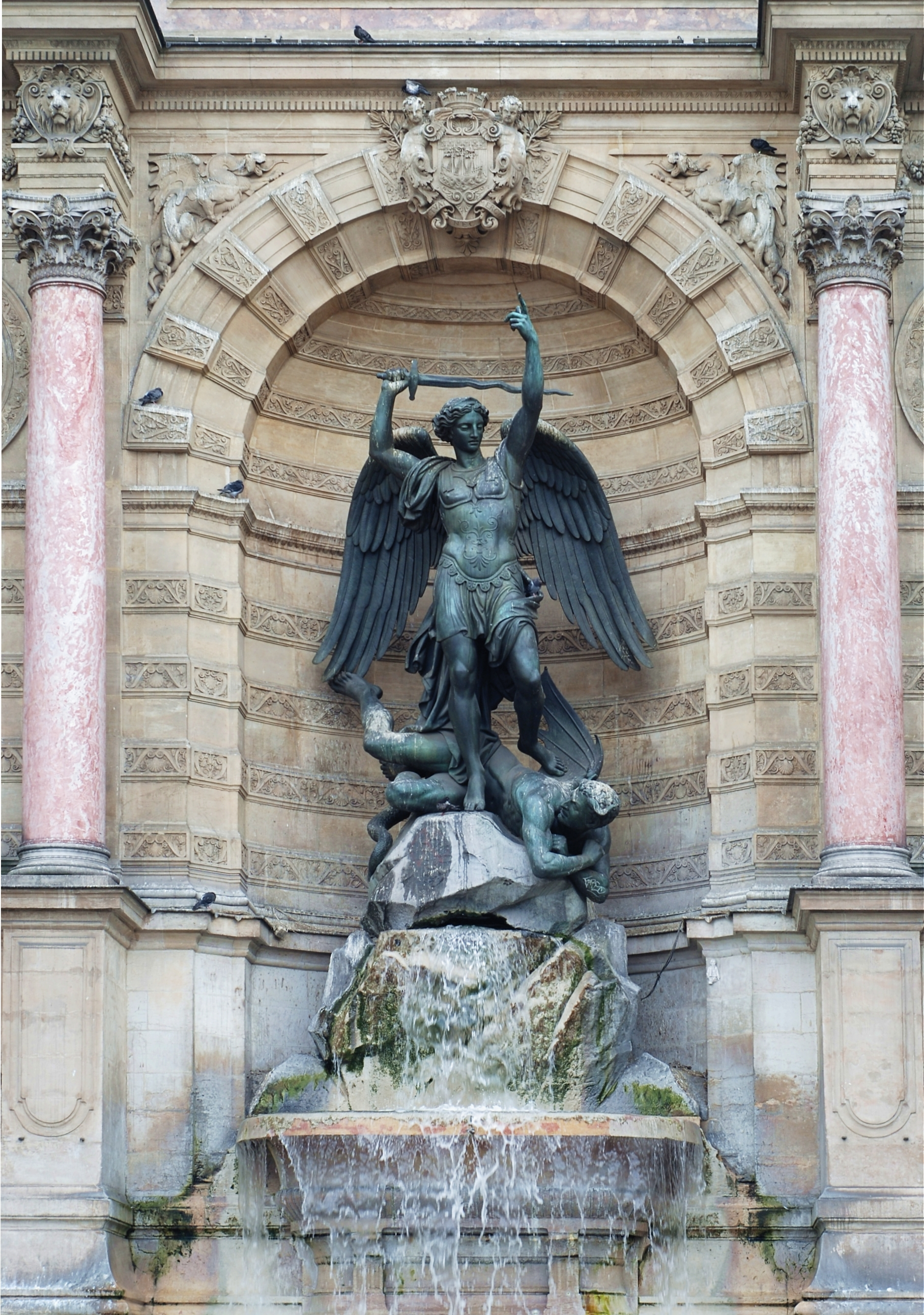
Archangel Michael and the devil, by Francisque-Joseph Duret, centerpiece of the Fontaine Saint-Michel

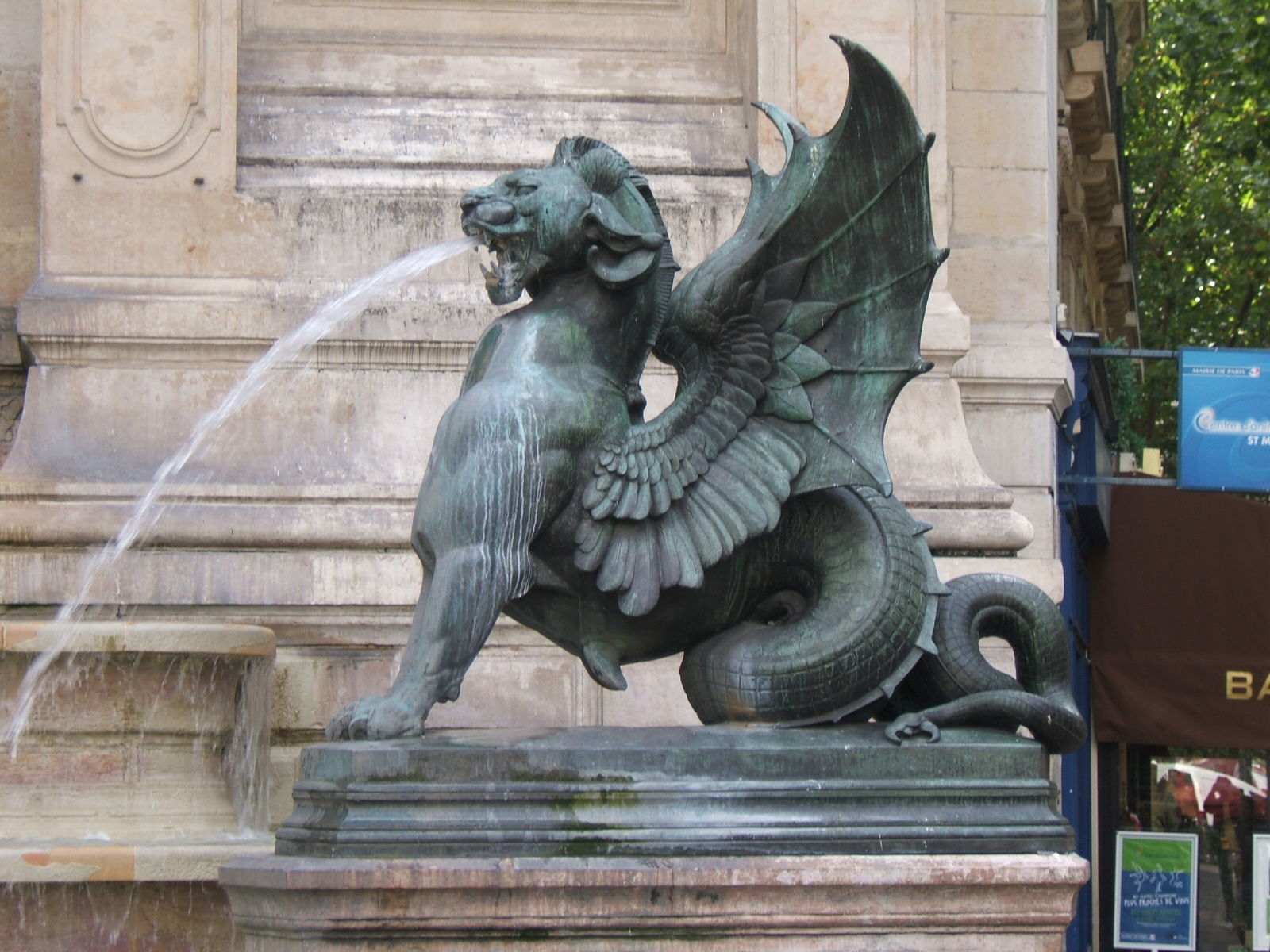
Dragon by Henri Alfred Jacquemart in front of Fontaine Saint-Michel

The Fontaine Saint-Michel (French pronunciation: [fɔ̃tɛn sɛ̃ miʃɛl]) is a monumental fountain on the Place Saint-Michel in the 5th arrondissement of Paris. It was constructed in 1858–1860 during Haussmann's renovation of Paris following plans by architect Gabriel Davioud. It has been listed since 1926 as a monument historique by the Ministry of Culture.

== History ==
The Fontaine Saint-Michel was part of the great project for the reconstruction of Paris overseen by Baron Haussmann during the French Second Empire. In 1855 Haussmann completed an enormous new boulevard, originally called the Boulevard de Sébastopol-rive-gauche, now called the Boulevard Saint-Michel, which opened up the small Place Saint-Michel (which faces Pont Saint-Michel) into a much larger space. Haussmann asked the architect of the service of promenades and plantations of the prefecture, Gabriel Davioud, to design a fountain which would be appropriate in scale to the new square. As the architect of the prefecture, he was able to design not only the fountain but also the facades of the new buildings around it, giving coherence to the square, but he also had to deal with the demands of the prefet and city administration, which was paying for the project.

Davioud's original project was for a fountain dedicated to peace, located in the center of the square. The prefect authorities rejected this idea and asked him instead to build a fountain to hide the end wall of the building at the corner of the Boulevard Saint-Michel and the Rue Saint-André-des-Arts. This forced Davioud to adapt his plan to the proportions of that building.

The next design made by Davioud in 1856 provided the architectural structure of the fountain; a facade divided into four horizontal levels, similar to a triumphal arch, with four Corinthian columns on high socles framing the central niche. The main cornice is surmounted by a French Renaissance design feature, an inscribed tablet in a grand architectural framing. As the revised site was just off the axis of the bridge, Davioud created a visual compromise in a series of shallow bowed basins through which the water issuing from the rock under the supine body of Saint Michael's adversary spills. The water ends in a basin sunk into street level, with a curving front edge that softens the line of the monument's architectural base.

In the 1856 plan, Davioud placed a feminine statue of Peace into the central niche. The 1858 plan called for replacing Peace with a statue of Napoleon Bonaparte. This provoked furious opposition from the opponents of Napoleon III, so later in 1858 Davioud proposed that the central figure be the Archangel Michael wrestling with the devil. This was agreed, construction began in June 1858, and the statue was inaugurated on August 15, 1860.

In 1860 the center of the attic level was decorated with geometric motifs in colored marble. These were replaced in 1862 or 1863 with a bas-relief of scrolls and children, by Noémi Constant.

In September 1870, after the capture of Emperor Napoleon III by the Germans during the French-German War and his abdication, the fountain was threatened by a mob. On September 5, Davioud wrote an urgent letter to the Director of the Municipal Service of Promenades and Plantations: "A crowd of unarmed workers have just come to the Fontaine Saint-Michel..they apparently want to attack the fountain and want to deface the eagles and inscriptions on the upper part. What should I do?" Along with other symbols of the Second Empire, the fountain appears to have been damaged during the 1871 uprising and suppression of the Paris Commune. The lead eagles that topped it were destroyed at that time.

In 1872, Davioud was authorized by the Prefecture to make urgent repairs to the fountain. It was again repaired again in 1893. The imperial arms which originally decorated the fountain's pediment were replaced by those of the City of Paris on one of those occasions.

=== Gallery ===
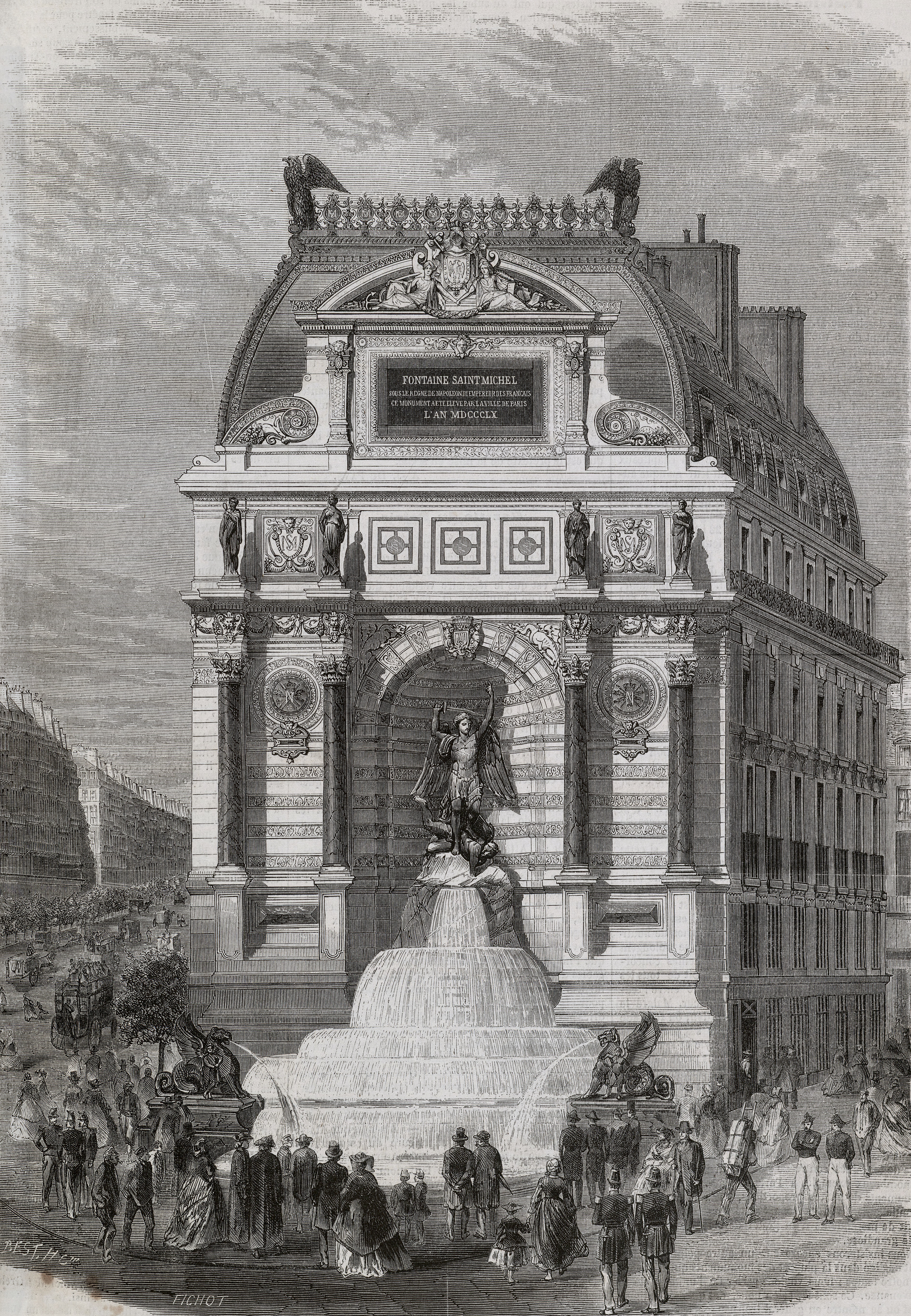
Inauguration on 15 August 1860

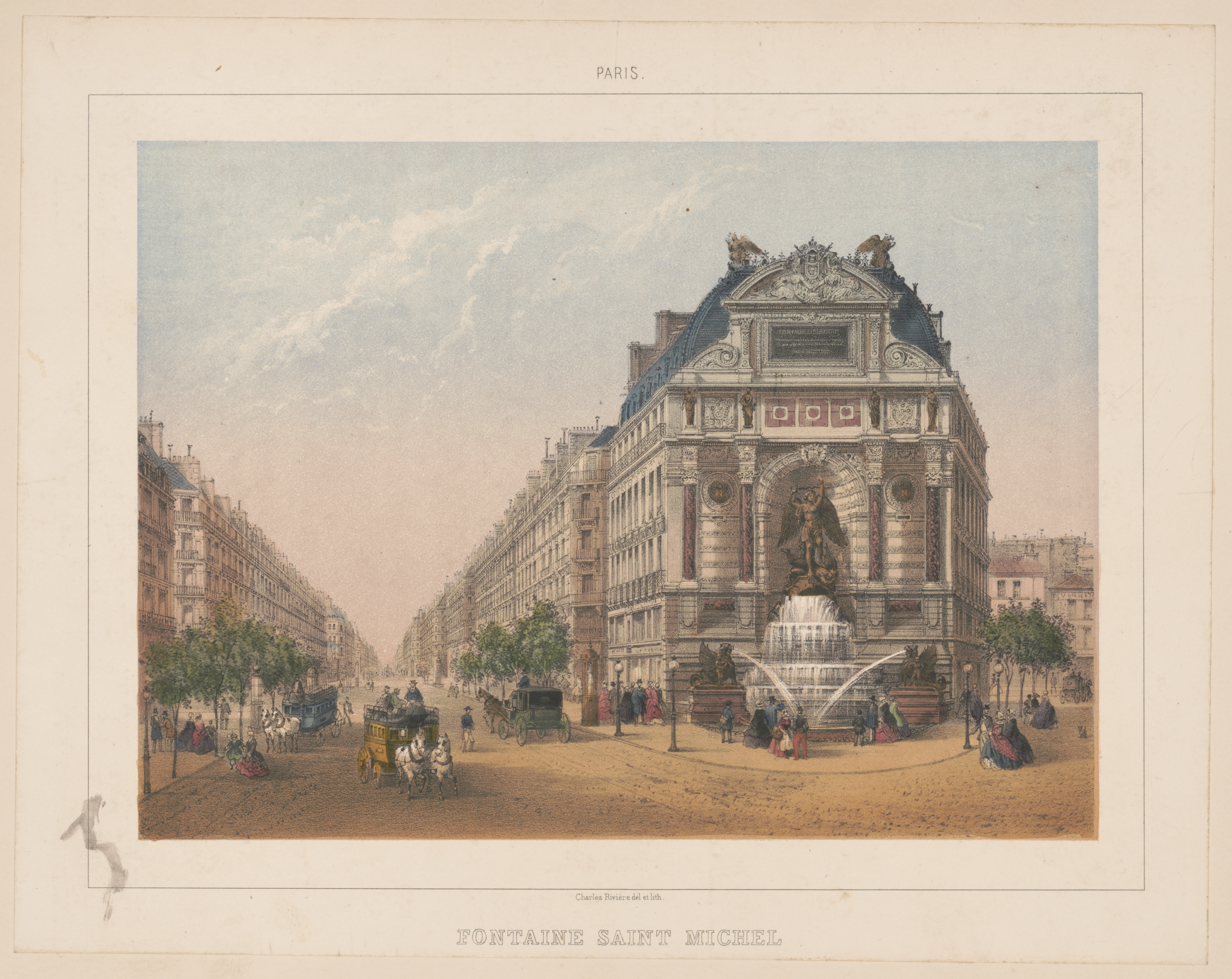
The fountain in the early 1860s, with red marble motifs on the attic

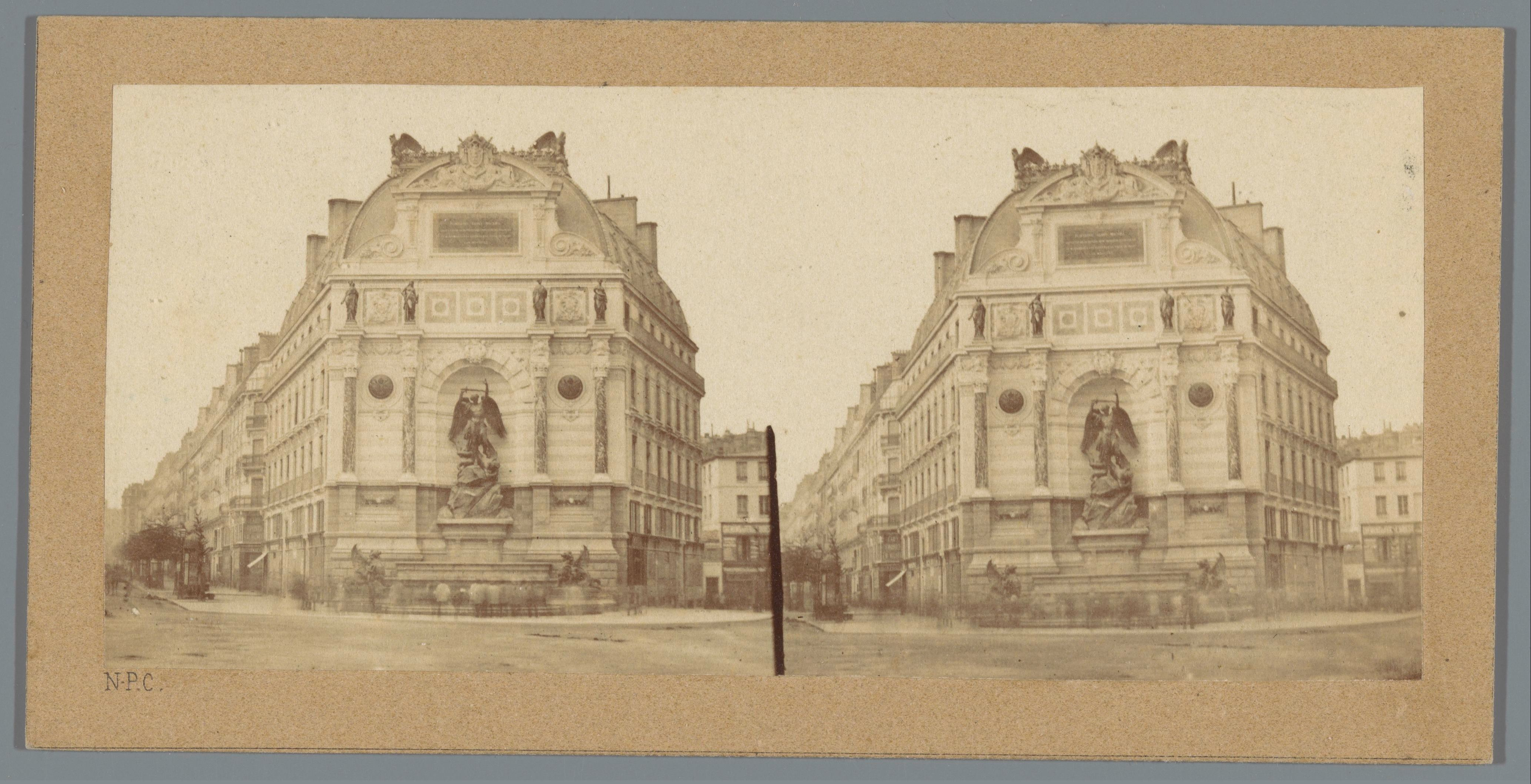
Photograph of the fountain in the early 1860s

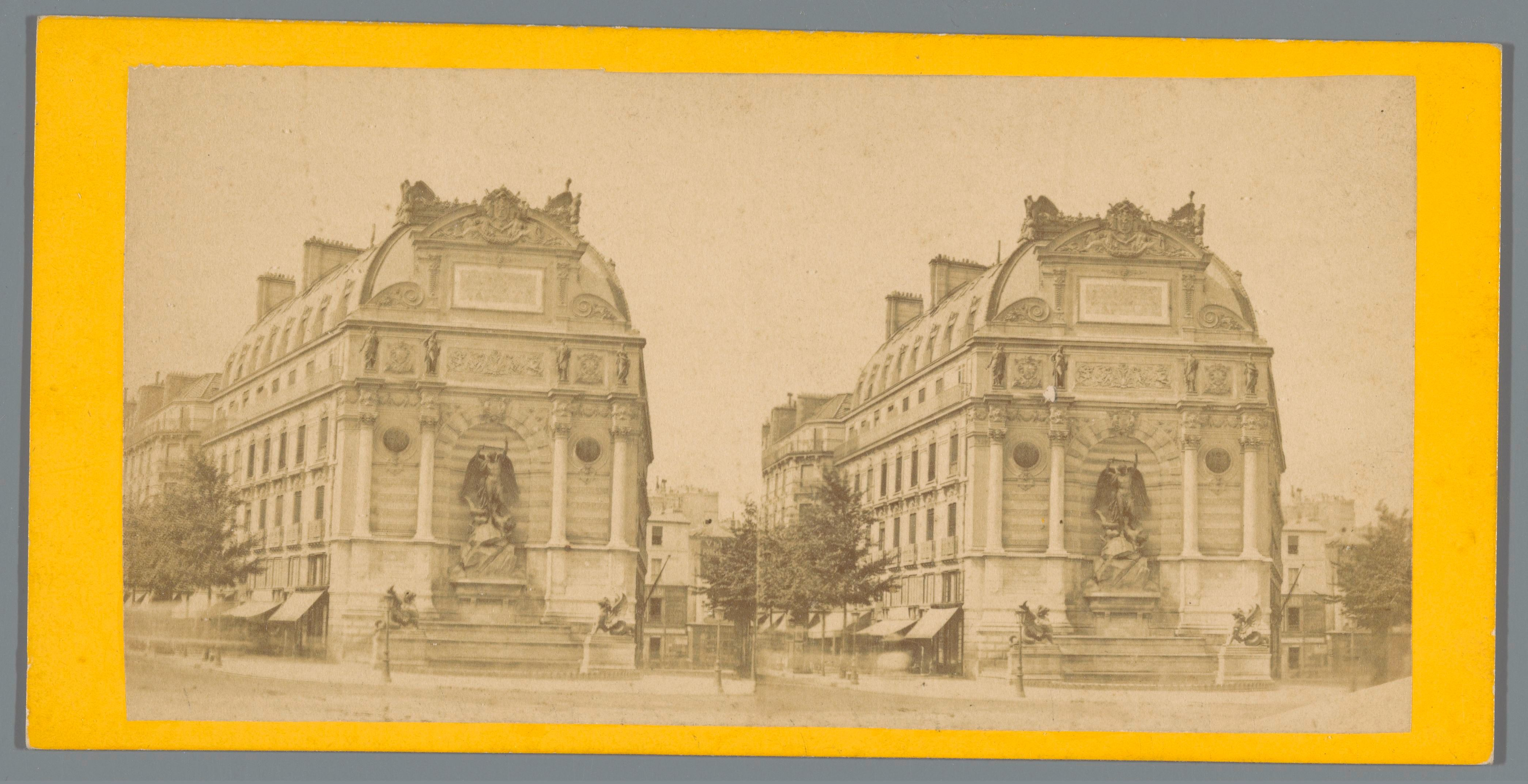
Photograph of the fountain in the later 1860s with Noémi Cadiot's relief on the attic

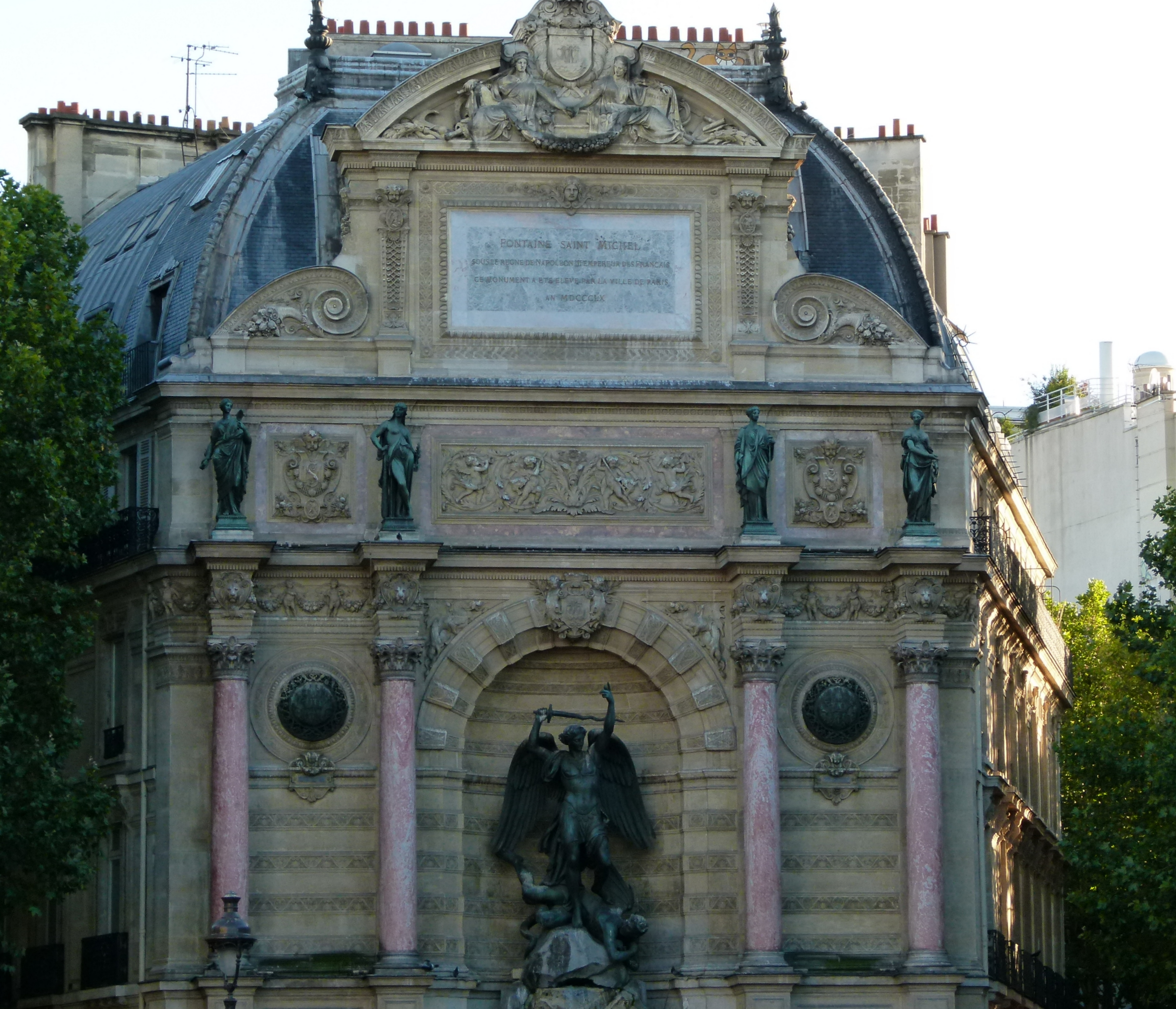
The post-1870s upper part, without imperial eagles and with the Paris emblem having replaced imperial arms

== Decoration ==
Davioud was himself a trained neoclassical sculptor from the Ecole des Beaux-Arts, and the large scale (26 meters by 15 meters) and the elaborate iconography he created for the fountain required the work of nine different sculptors. It features:

- Two winged dragons on either side of the fountain by Henri Alfred Jacquemart.
- The figure of Saint Michael and the devil by Francisque-Joseph Duret
- The rock under Saint Michael by Félix Saupin
- Bas-reliefs and ornamental foliage by Marie-Noémi Cadiot

Four statues representing the cardinal virtues:

- Prudence holding a serpent and a mirror, by Jean-Auguste Barre
- Force holding a club, by Claude-Jean Guillaume
- Justice holding scales and a rod, by Louis-Valentin Robert
- Temperance holding a bridle, by Charles-Alphonse Guméry
- bas-reliefs of Force and Moderation, holding the coat of arms of Paris, by Auguste-Hyacinthe Debay

The fountain was different from most other Paris fountains because it used different colors of stone; columns of red marble from Languedoc; green marble; blue stone from Soignies; yellow stone from Saint-Yllie; and bronze statues.

== Critical reaction ==
The critical reaction to the fountain when it was opened in 1860 was divided. Much attention was given to the different colors: The critic of Le Monde Illustré wrote: "the monument constitutes, in sum, a venture into polychrome architecture such as one can see in Rome, where fountains of the same style were created by artists of the 18th century."

The critic Alfred Darcel in Gazette des Beaux-Arts was less enthusiastic: he condemned the fountain for its choice of colors, its composition, what he called its incoherent style and iconography, and because, in his view, the concentration of so many different statues by different artists nullified the individual talents of the artists.

Other critics condemned the statue for its placement against a wall, instead of in the center of the Square. It was, said one, "a placement frequent in Paris, but vicious for monuments of this grandiose style." The Fontaine Saint-Michel was the last monumental wall fountain built in Paris, the end of a traditional Renaissance style which had begun with the Medici Fountain in the 17th century and continued with the Fontaine des Quatre-Saisons in the 18th century. The later monumental fountains in Paris were all free-standing, in the centers of squares or parks.
