= World Voices =

World Voices was a vocal ensemble based in Minneapolis/Saint Paul, conducted by Dr. Karle Erickson, Artistic Director. The ensemble was founded in 1996 as "Karle Erickson’s Metropolitan Chorale", but changed its name to World Voices within one season. It performed until its dissolution in 2008. At each of its concerts, World Voices focused on the music of a particular culture or region of the world. Membership in the chorale has ranged from about 25 to 40 vocalists over its 13 years of existence.

The ensemble routinely collaborates with instrumentalists associated with the music from a specific culture. Among the artists World Voices has collaborated with are:

- Sowah Mensah, master drummer from Ghana
- Gao Hong, Chinese pipa player
- Brent Michael Davids, composer and crystal flute player from the Stockbridge–Munsee Community (Mohican Nation)
- Reverend Tony Machado from Puerto Rico
- Neil Newman, Cantor at Beth El Synagogue in Minneapolis
- Hua Chen, erhu player
- Lakota George Estes, flute player/maker from the Lakota Sioux Tribe
- Nicolas Carter, Paraguayan harpist
- Zeljko Pavlovic, violinist from Sarajevo
- The University of Minnesota Steel Drum Ensemble

World Voices has commissioned several original works, including Wo Ayi Me A Ma by Sowah Mensah in March 2001, Of This Turtle Isle by Brent Michael Davids in 2002, Si Ji by the Chinese-born American composer Zhou Long in March 2005, and Medicine Woman by Janika Vandervelde in 2006 with Cochise Anderson playing Native American flutes and percussion.

World Voices has performed music from at least 62 countries in 35 different languages.

They have released seven CDs:

- Latino Groove
- A Cultural Odyssey
- A Global Palette
- Celebrating Global Cultures
- Mosaic
- A World of Christmas
- Hope for Our Time
