= Harballabh Sangeet Sammelan =

Hindustani Classical Music festival

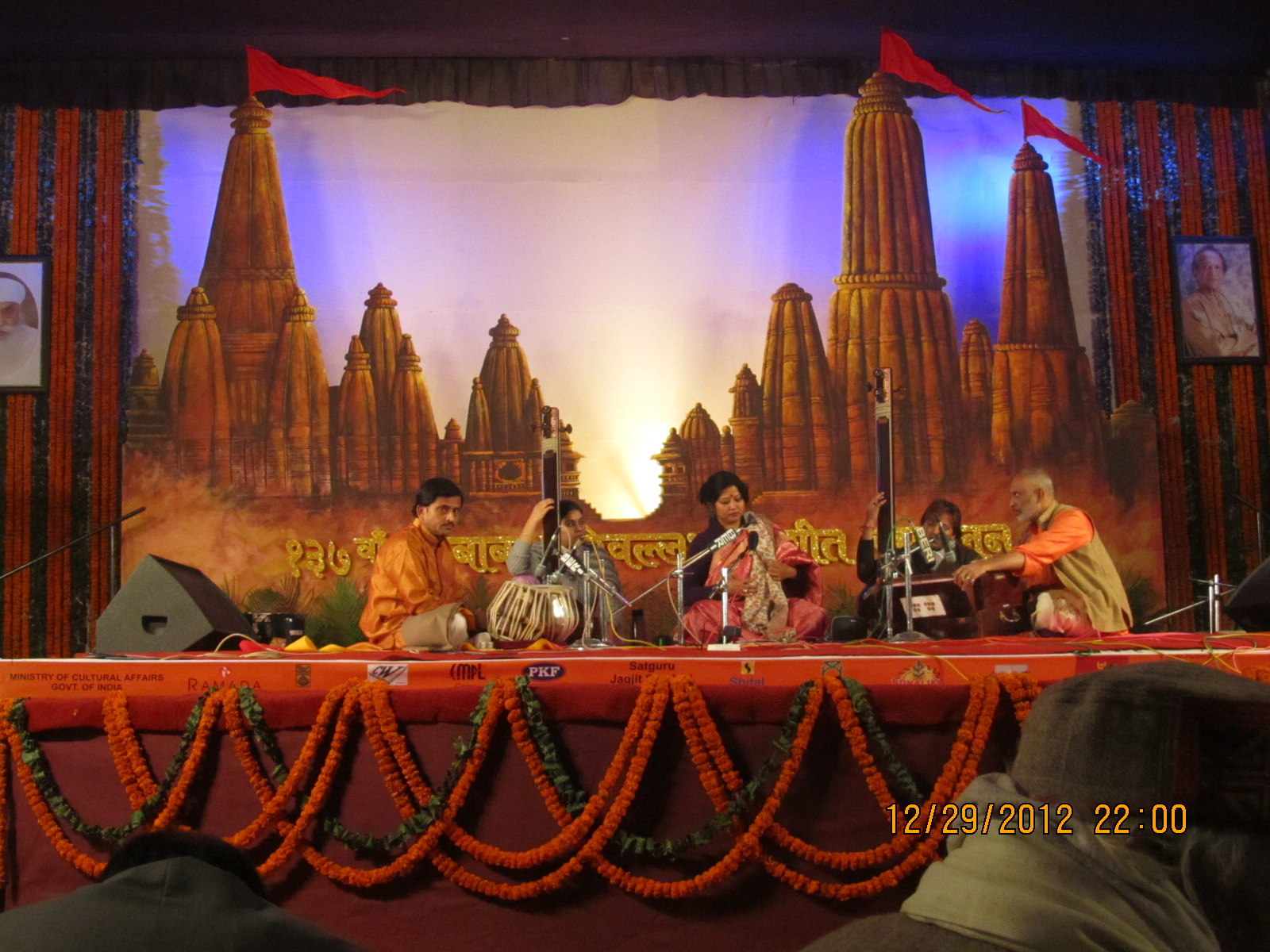
- Dates: 27 to 30 December
- Locations: Jalandhar, Punjab, India
- Years active: 1875 – present
- Founders: Baba Harballabh

Harballabh Sangeet Sammelan is the oldest festival of Hindustani Classical Music in the world, which is celebrated every year at the sacred seat of music, the samadhi of Baba Harballabh – a saint and an exponent of Hindustani Classical Music. The first Sammelan was held in 1875 at the Sidh Peeth-Shri Devi Talab, in Jalandhar. Since then it has been held every year.

== History ==
The Sangeet Sammelan which has grown from strength to strength in the last 131 years has been attracting audiences and artists from all across the country and abroad. This festival was declared as one of the National Festivals by the Department of Tourism, Govt. of India. All prominent artists of Hindustani Classical Music from India and Pakistan have come and performed at the Harballabh Sangeet Sammelan at one time or the other during the last 130 years. Union Ministers, Governors, State Chief Ministers, State Ministers and other VIPs have been visiting to pay their reverence at this festival of music. The festival attracts thousands of music lovers from all over the India and abroad every year. This number is increasing year after year.

In 1956 a Sangeet Academy was constructed under the banner of Swami Hariballabh. While we hear Swami Hariballabh it seems clear that "The key to the mystery of a great artist is that for reasons unknown, he will give away his energies and his life just to make sure that one note follows another... and leaves us with the feeling that something is right in the world."

== The festival ==
The main aim of the festival was to attract and encourage more and more people for the development of classical Music. There is also a proper syllabus for the pursuers of Music and there is a shrine at the banks of the river with the name Devi Talab. There is a Shiva lingam in the temple nearby and one adores the exquisite phallic image of Lord Shiva. On the day of the fair there is also free lodging and accommodation.

== Venue ==
It is held at Devi Talab Mandir, near the Samadhi of Saint Harballabh, from 27 to 30 December. During this time reputed musicians from all over India gather in Jalandhar to celebrate Indian Classical Music.

== See also ==
- List of Indian classical music festivals
