= Gabriel Davioud =

French architect (1824–1881)

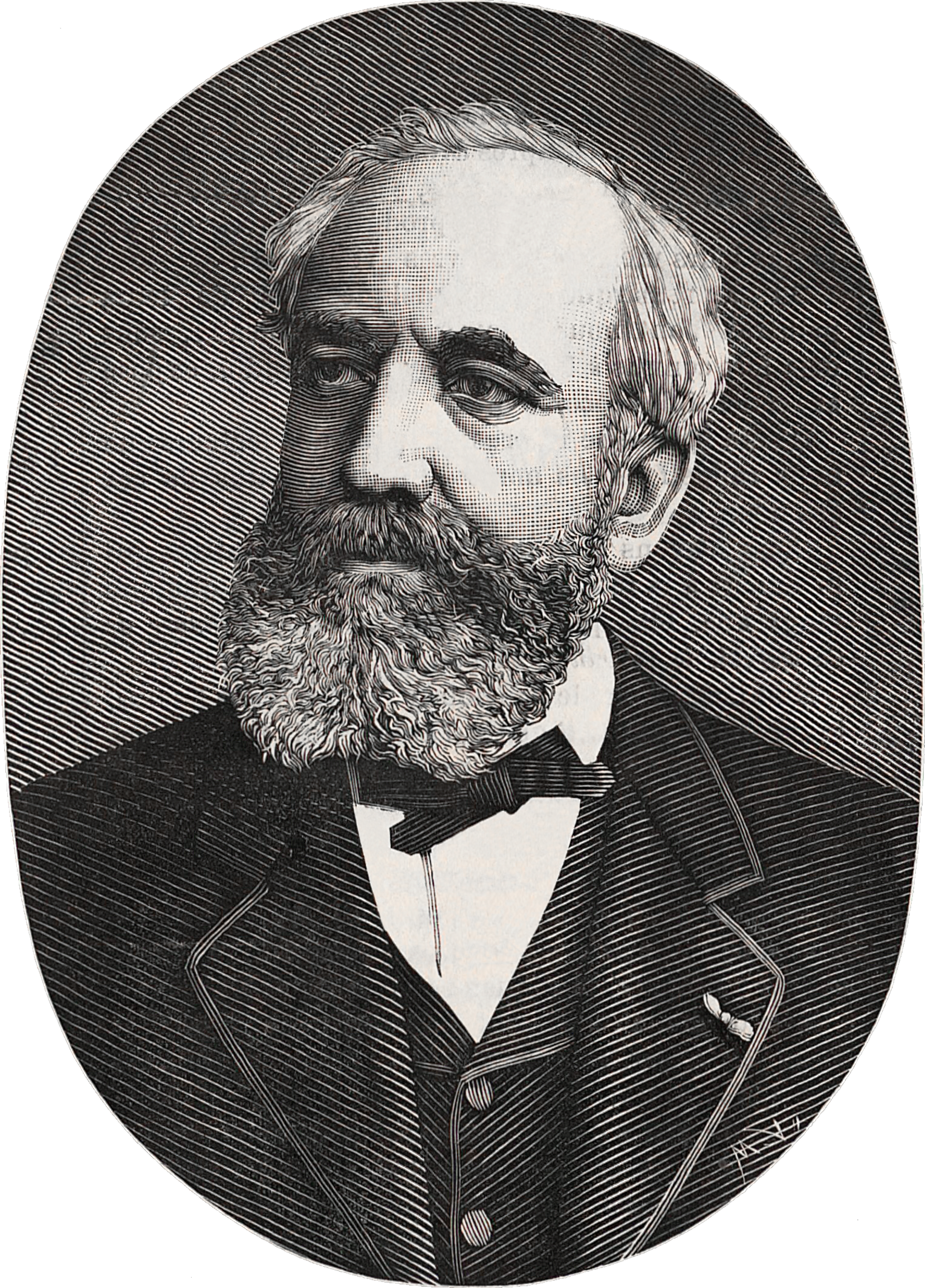
Gabriel Davioud

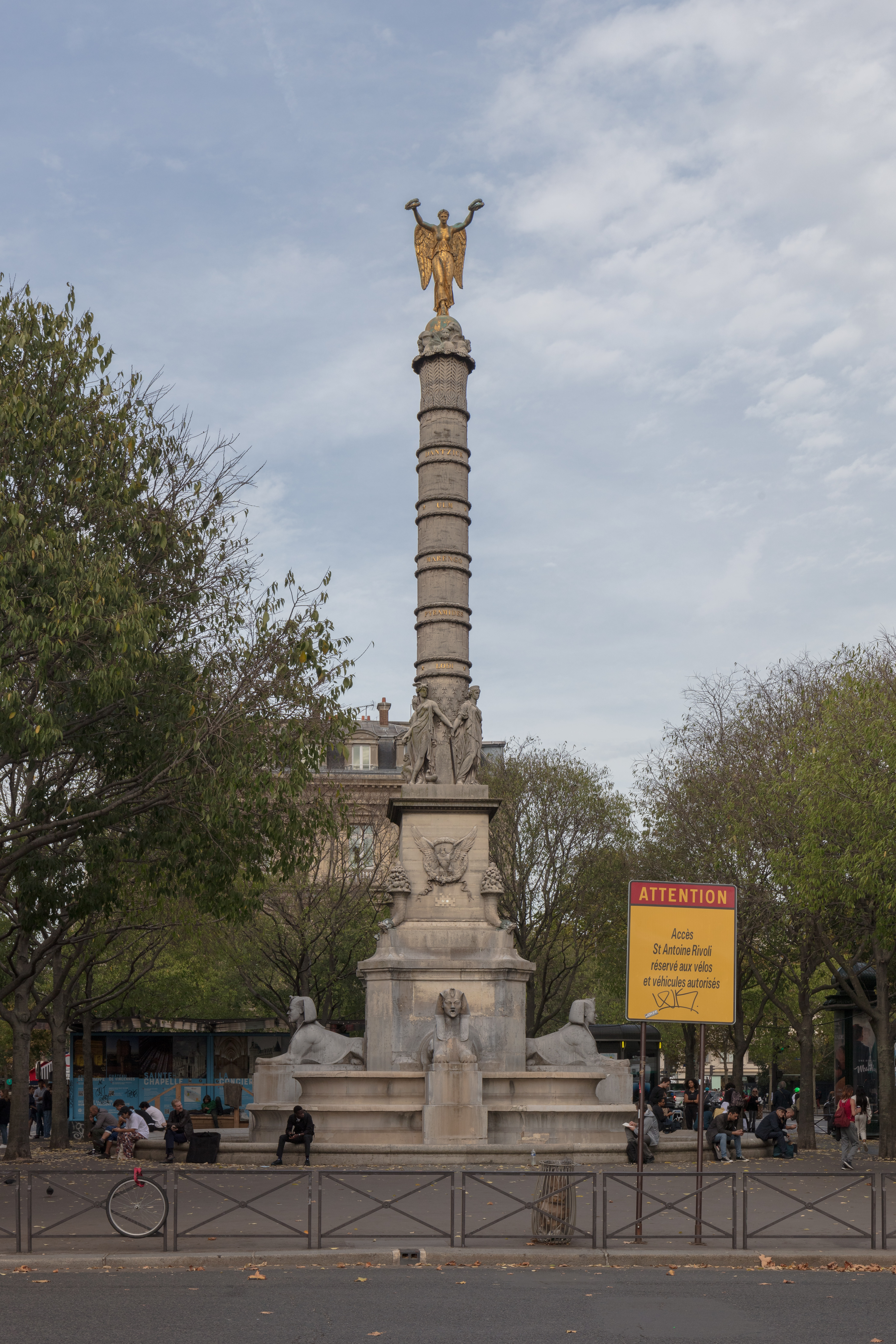
Place du Châtelet, Paris, featuring works by Gabriel Davioud

Gabriel Jean Antoine Davioud (French: [ʒɑ̃ ɑ̃twan ɡabʁijɛl davju]; 30 October 1824 – 6 April 1881) was a French architect and a proponent of eclecticism in architecture. He worked closely with Baron Haussmann on the transformation of Paris under Napoleon III during the Second Empire. Davioud is remembered for his numerous contributions to Parisian architecture, notably the now-former Trocadéro Palace, which he co-designed with Jules Bourdais, the two theatres on the Place du Châtelet (Théâtre du Châtelet and Théâtre de la Ville), the Fontaine Saint-Michel, as well as urban amenities such as pavilions, benches and kiosks. These contributions now form an integral part of the style of Haussmann's Paris. His work demonstrated the integration of architecture, urban planning, and public amenities in the modernization of nineteenth century of Paris.

== Biography ==
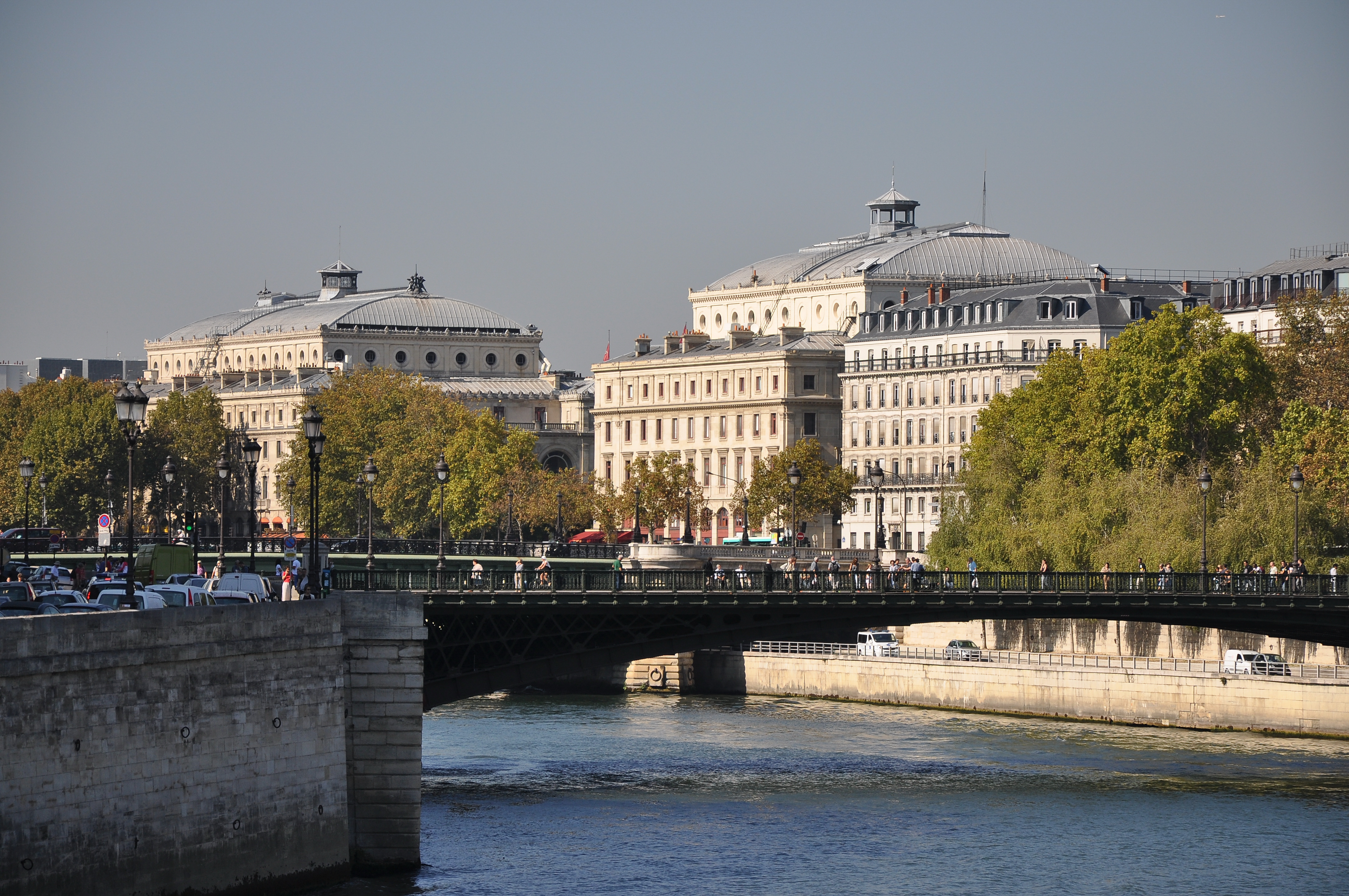
The two theatres in central Paris designed by Davioud

Davioud was born in Paris and studied at the École des Beaux-Arts under Léon Vaudoyer. He won the prestigious Second Grand Prix de Rome. In 1843, he began working in the planning department of the municipal government of Paris. First, he served as an assistant inspector and later was promoted to inspector general for architectural works. In 1855, he became chief architect for the city’s parks and public spaces, where he worked with Jean-Charles Adolphe Alphand (e.g. on the Bois de Boulogne and the Bois de Vincennes).

In November 1851, Davioud was asked to execute drawings of the façades of 80 of the 250 buildings that were to be demolished under Haussmann’s plans to extend the rue de Rivoli in central Paris. The demolitions were to begin in early 1852. This left only 60 days for Davioud to complete his drawings, which were to be colorized using his notes. He completed the task, but many of these drawings were destroyed when the Hôtel de Ville (the town hall) was burned down in 1871 during the Paris Commune. The surviving drawings now form part of the archive of documentation of what Paris looked like before the Haussmann-led transformation during the Second Empire.

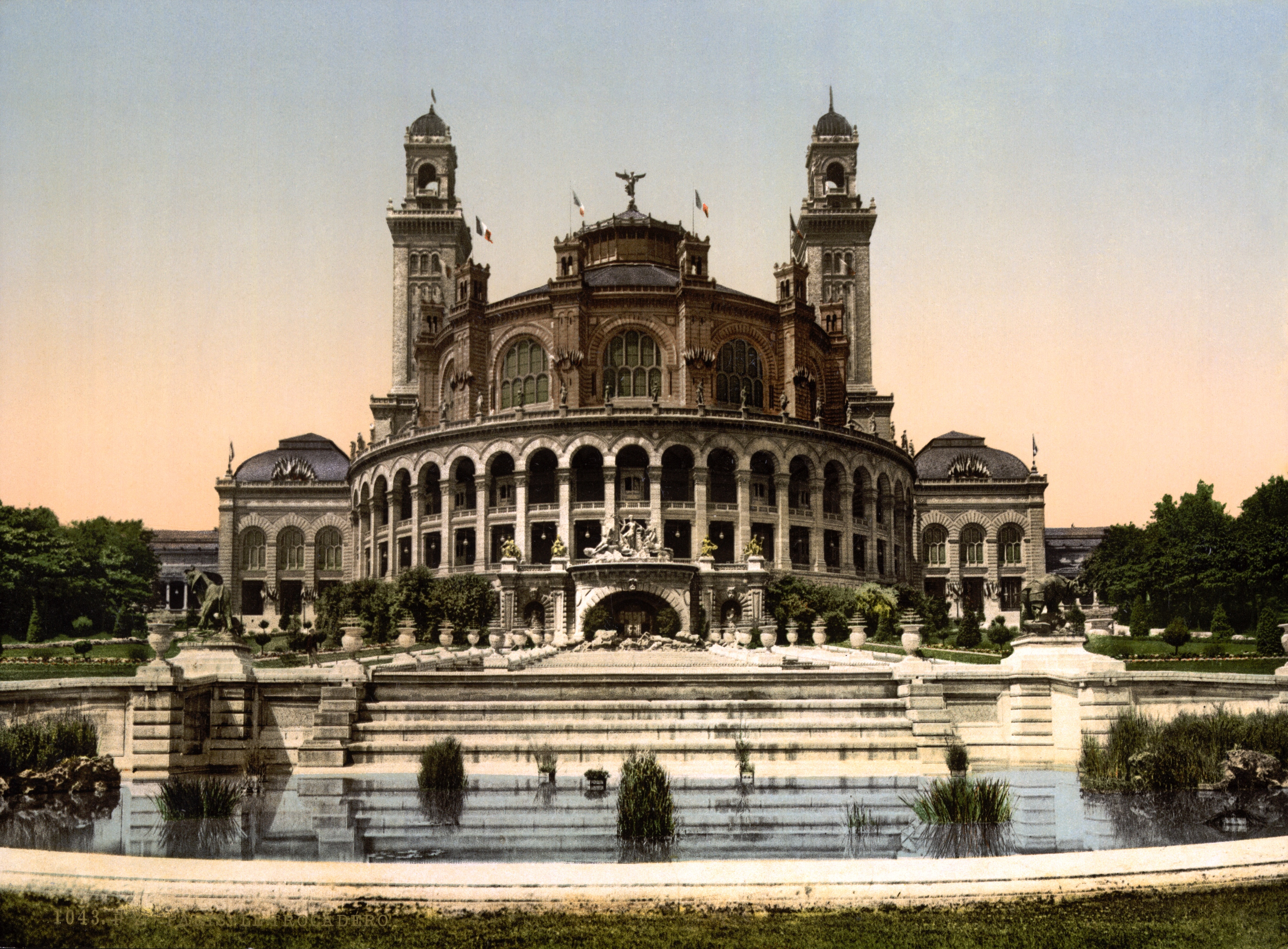
The Palais du Trocadero, built for the World Fair of 1878

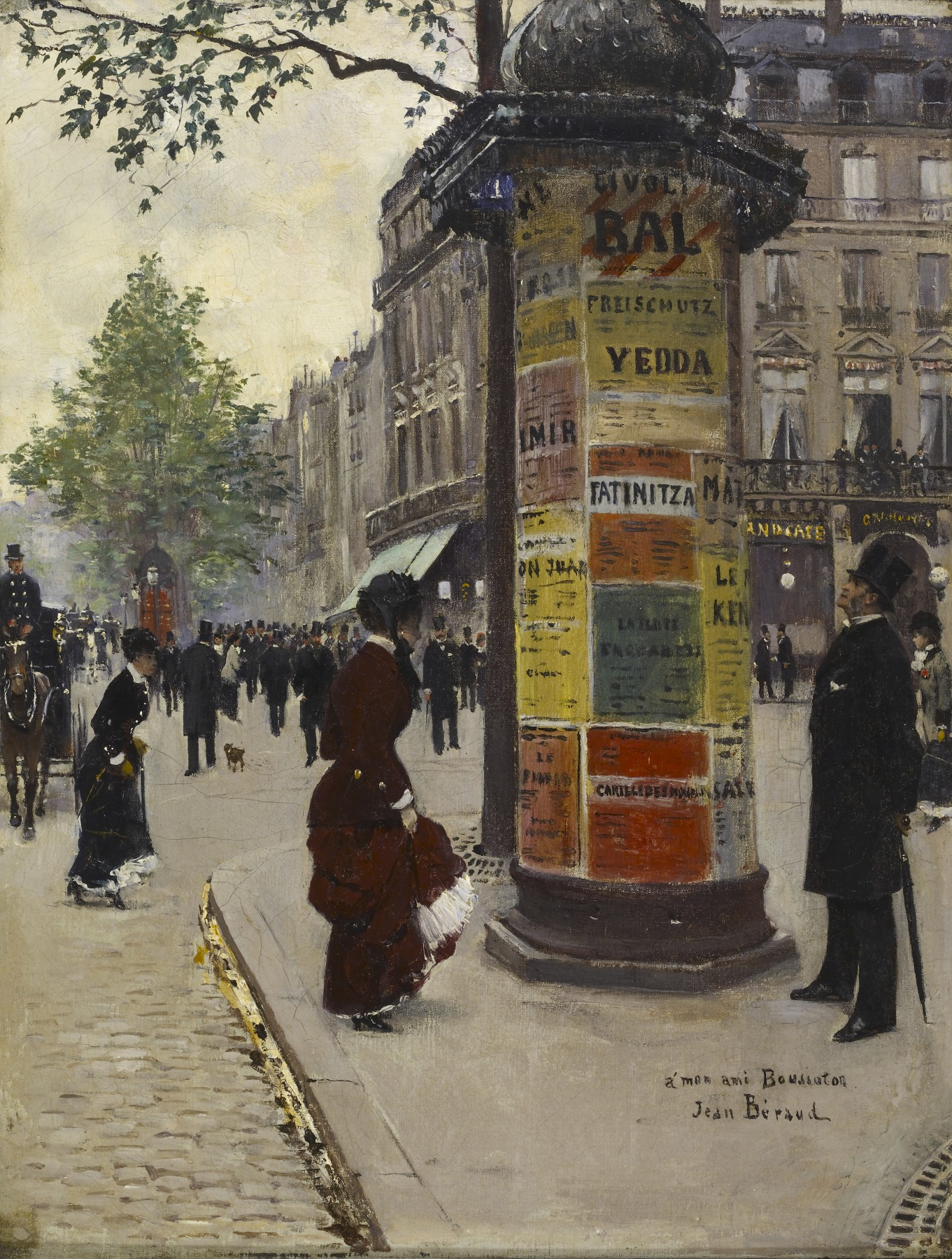
Painting with publicity column (colonne Morris) designed by Davioud

Davioud spent his entire career in the planning department of Paris. He was a key member of the team that radically altered the city’s layout and look. As a close associate of the urban planner Baron Haussmann, his work was influenced by the highly regulated and methodical nature of the urban reforms by Haussmann, who stressed on the importance of precise planning, geometric organization, and administrative mastery of transforming Paris. His work reflects how architecture in Paris functioned as part of a broader system in the nineteenth century, which combined urban planning, municipal administration, and architectural design. He designed much of the characteristic Parisian street furniture (benches, pavilions, bandstands, fountains, lampposts, signposts, fences, balustrades and jetties) as well as a number of landmark buildings. These works contributed to the formation an everyday urban experience in Paris and demonstrated how architecture goes beyond monuments to include functional public space. His work is noted for its ornamental style and for references to non-European motifs (e.g. the Moorish influences seen in the Palais du Trocadero). Among his most notable projects are the popular Saint-Michel Fountain in Place Saint-Michel, the old Palais du Trocadéro (built for the 1878 World Fair, demolished in 1937), the town hall of the nineteenth arrondissement and the two theatres at the Place du Châtelet (the Théâtre du Châtelet and the Théâtre de la Ville.) In the early 1930s, proposals to replace the Palais du Trocadéro with a new building to host the 1937 International Exposition led to an architectural debate within the French artistic community, an episode later described as the "affaire du Trocadéro." The Palais du Trocadéro was initially built in the year 1878 as the Exposition Universelle and the building was a significant architectural and cultural symbol of the event. Its construction corresponded to the electric style of that period and showed the way in which architecture was used to express the national identity and technological progress in the context of international exhibitions. The proposed demolition of the Palais du Trocadéro in 1933 created a significant debate within the French artistic and intellectual community. Opinions were divided, with some critics supporting its removal on aesthetic grounds, while others argued for its preservation because of its historical and cultural value.

In 1868, Davioud succeeded Jacques Landry as mayor of Houlgate, where he stayed until 1871. His mandate was interrupted when he was appointed capitaine du génie during the Franco-Prussian War. Noted for his work in Paris, he built a single villa in Houlgate, La Brise, on the Route de Caumont.

Davioud died in 1881. In 1918, his family donated 600 of his drawings to the General Inspectorate of Technical Services for Architecture. The drawings were subsequently divided between the Hôtel de Ville and a pavilion at Bagatelle. Their re-discovery in 1981 by the Library of the Hôtel de Ville helped to reveal Davioud’s major contributions to the city of Paris and rekindled interest in his work.

== Selected works ==
- Le Panorama National, now the Théâtre du Rond-Point, created for the Universal Exposition of 1855
- The Fontaine Saint-Michel, in the Place Saint-Michel, with sculptor Henri Alfred Jacquemart, 1860
- Two theatres at the Place du Châtelet (Théâtre du Châtelet and Théâtre de la Ville), 1860–1862
- Temple de la Sybille on the Île du Belvédère, Parc des Buttes-Chaumont, in the 19th arrondissement, 1869
- Fontaine de l'Observatoire and the Avenue de l'Observatoire (with sculptor Jean-Baptiste Carpeaux and others), 1873
- The Mairie, the municipal building in the 19th arrondissement, 1876–1878
- The former Palais du Trocadéro, built for the Universal Exposition of 1878
- Magasins-Réunis, in the Place de la République
- Jardin des Champs-Élysées
- Wrought-iron grillwork for the entry gate of the Parc Monceau, Davioud’s ornate gateway and the metal barrier accounted for half of the expense of re-designing the Parc.
- The redesign of Parc Monceau indicates the transformation of urban green spaces in the Haussmann era, combining the decorative design and the increased accessibility for the public and modern planning principles.
- Fontaine du Château d'eau, Place Daumesnil, 12th arrondissement
- Entry pavilions for the Bois de Boulogne, 16th arrondissement
- Square des Batignolles, 17th arrondissement

== Gallery ==
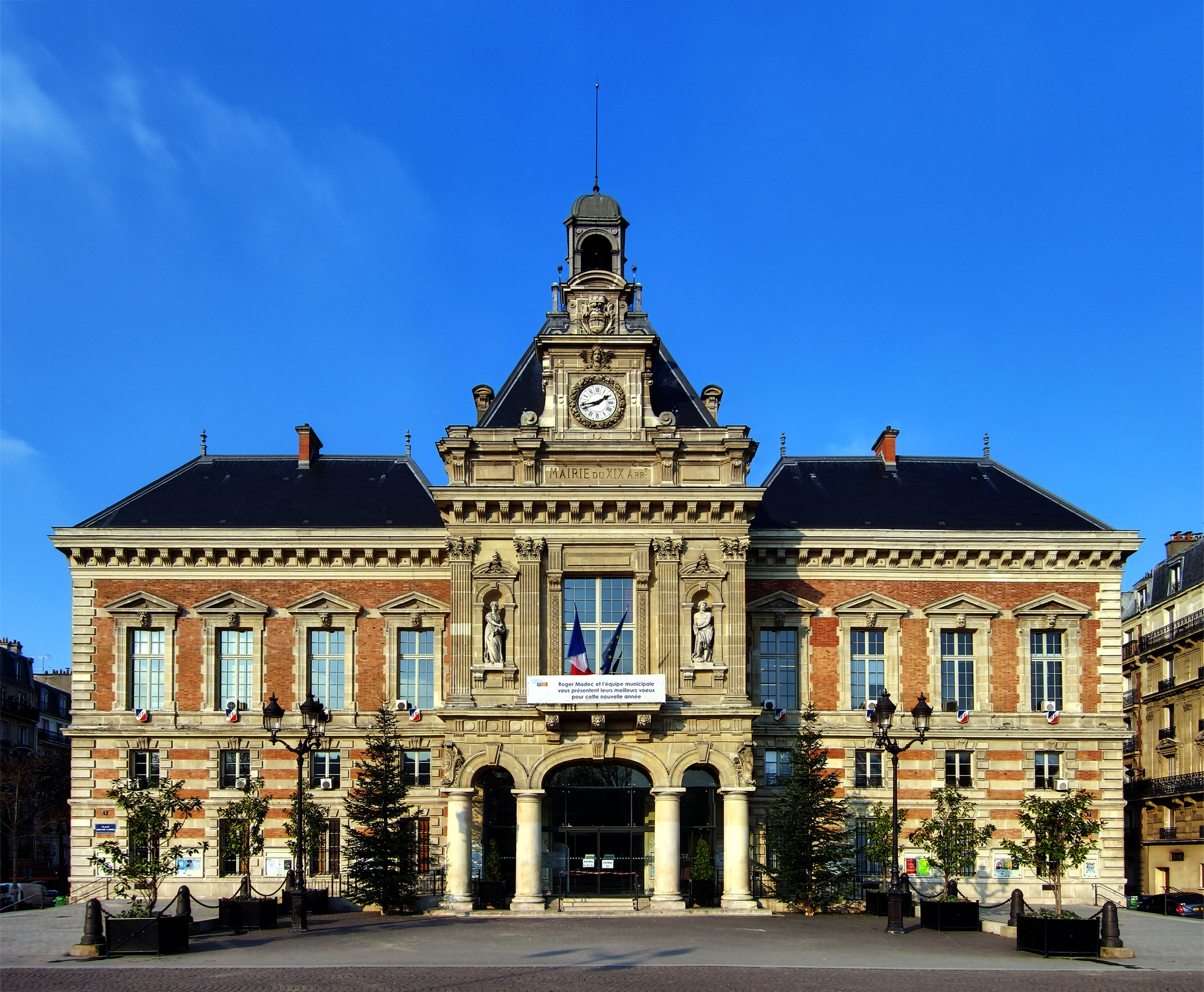
City hall of the 19th arrondissement of Paris

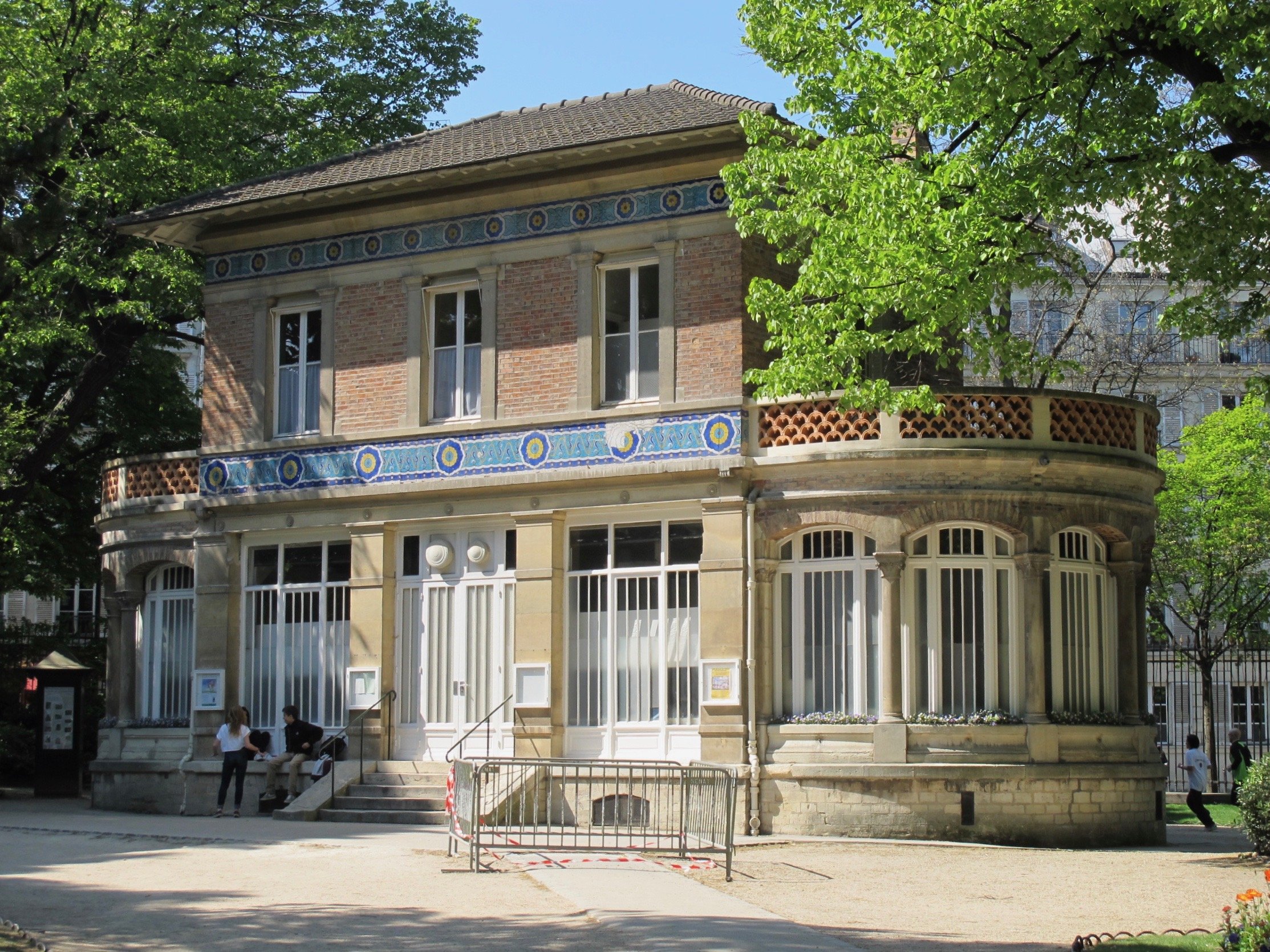
The Davioud Pavilion, Luxembourg Gardens

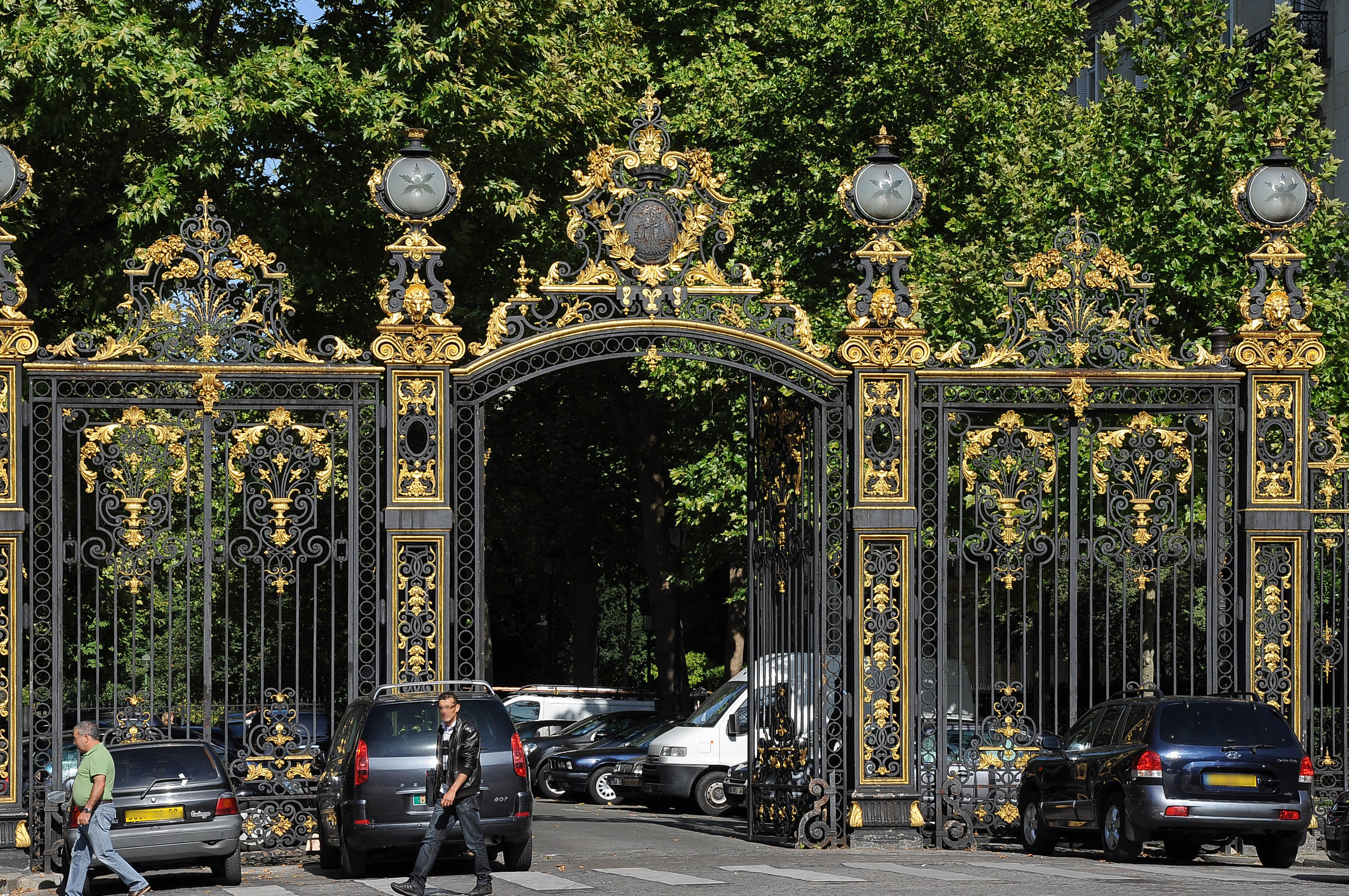
Wrought iron entryway to the Parc Monceau

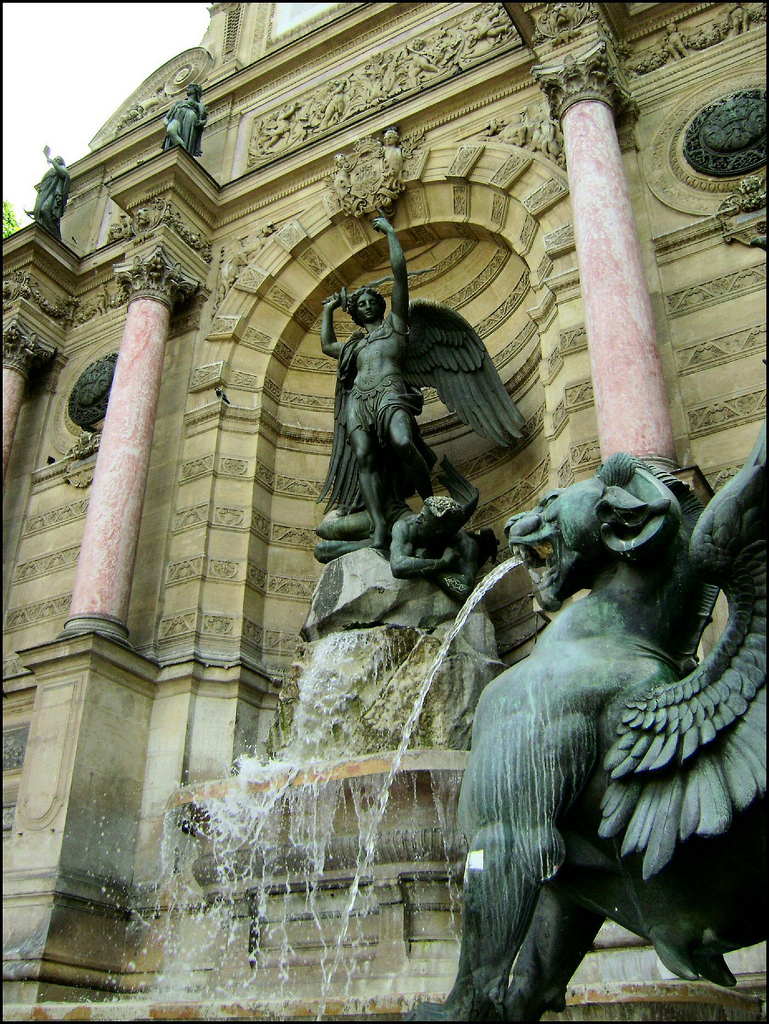
The Saint Michel Fountain

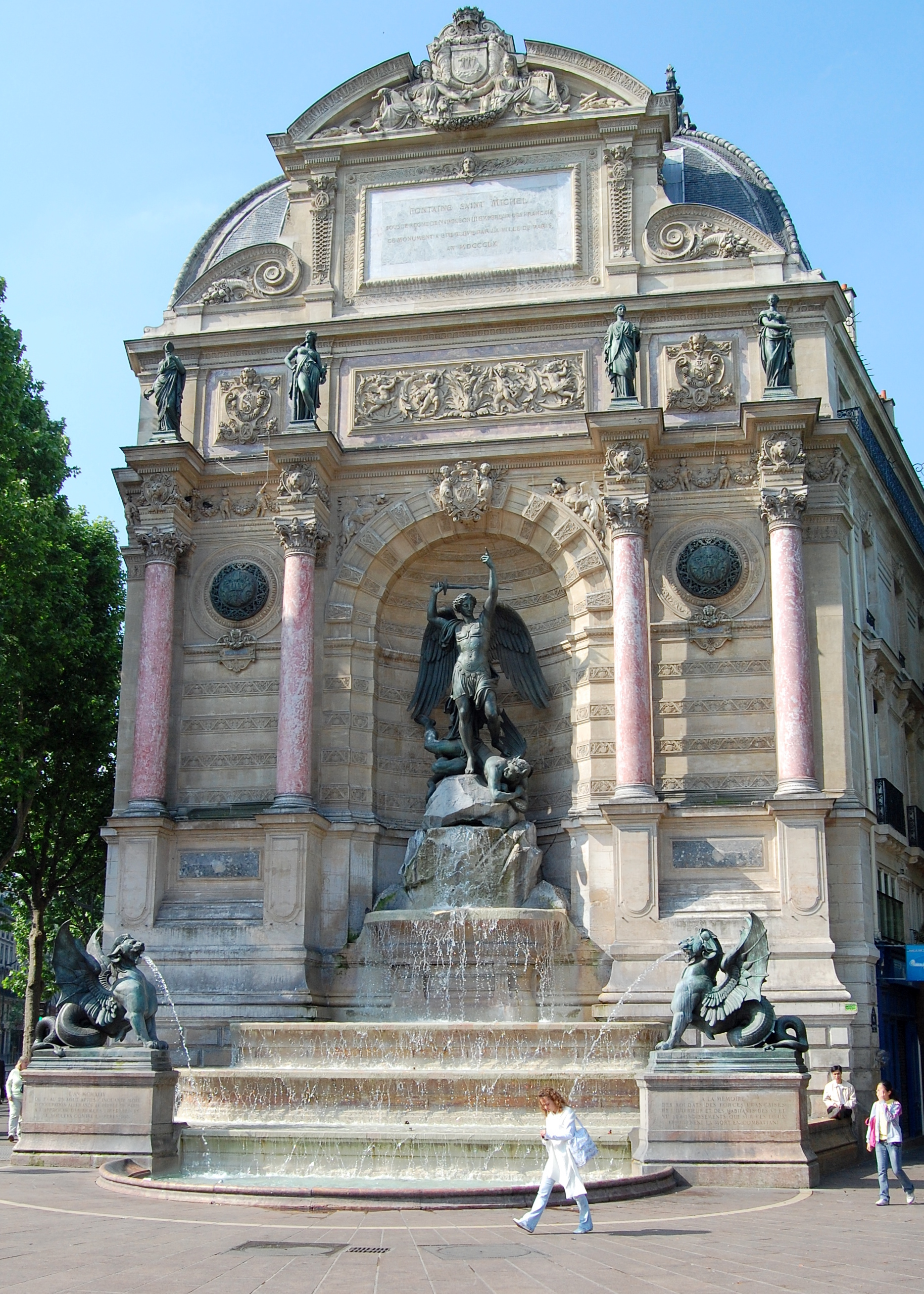
Another view of the Saint Michel Fountain

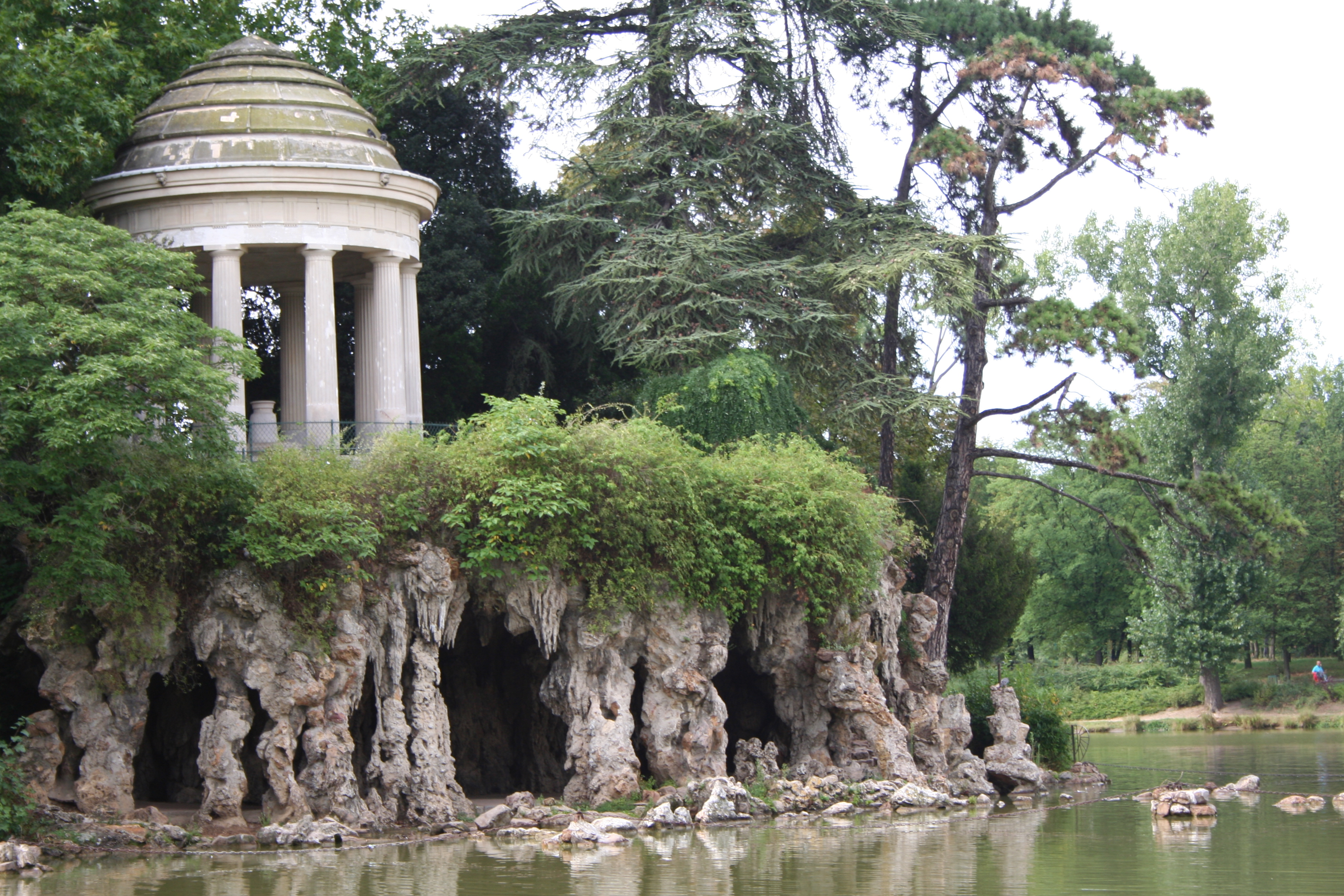
Rotonde and grotto on the Île de Reuilly in the Bois de Vincennes

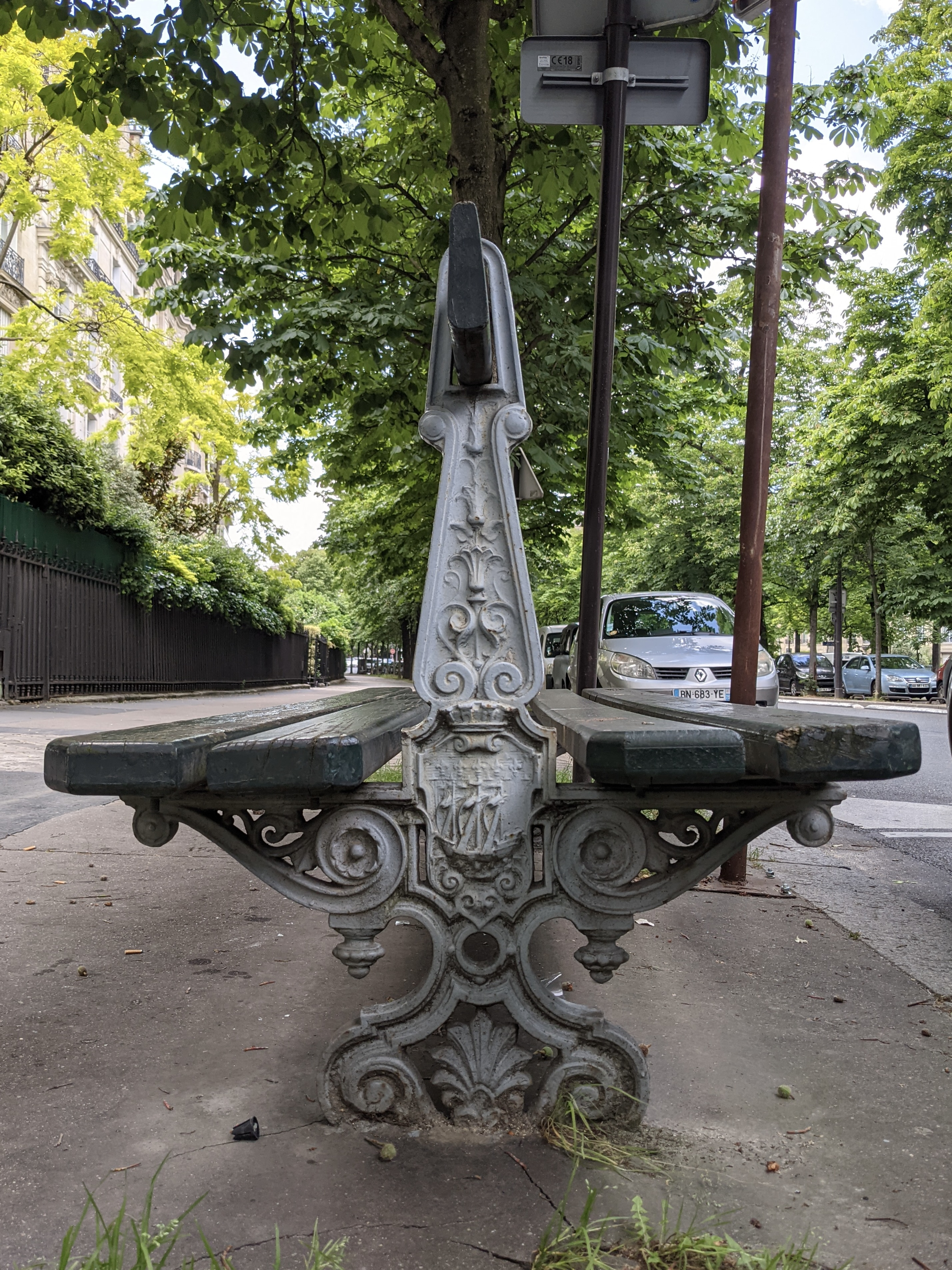
Davioud bench on Avenue Henri-Martin

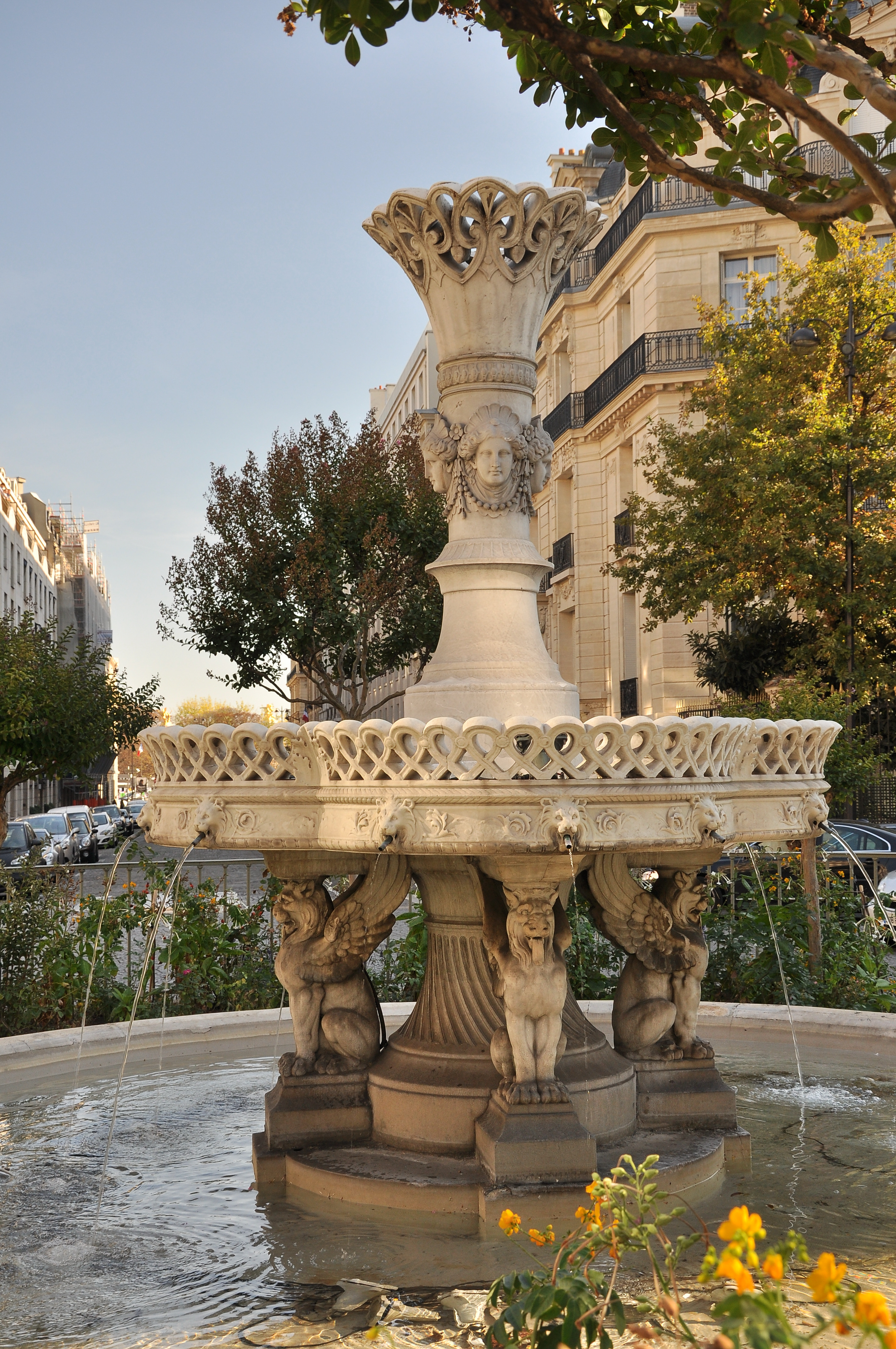
Fountain on Place François-Ier

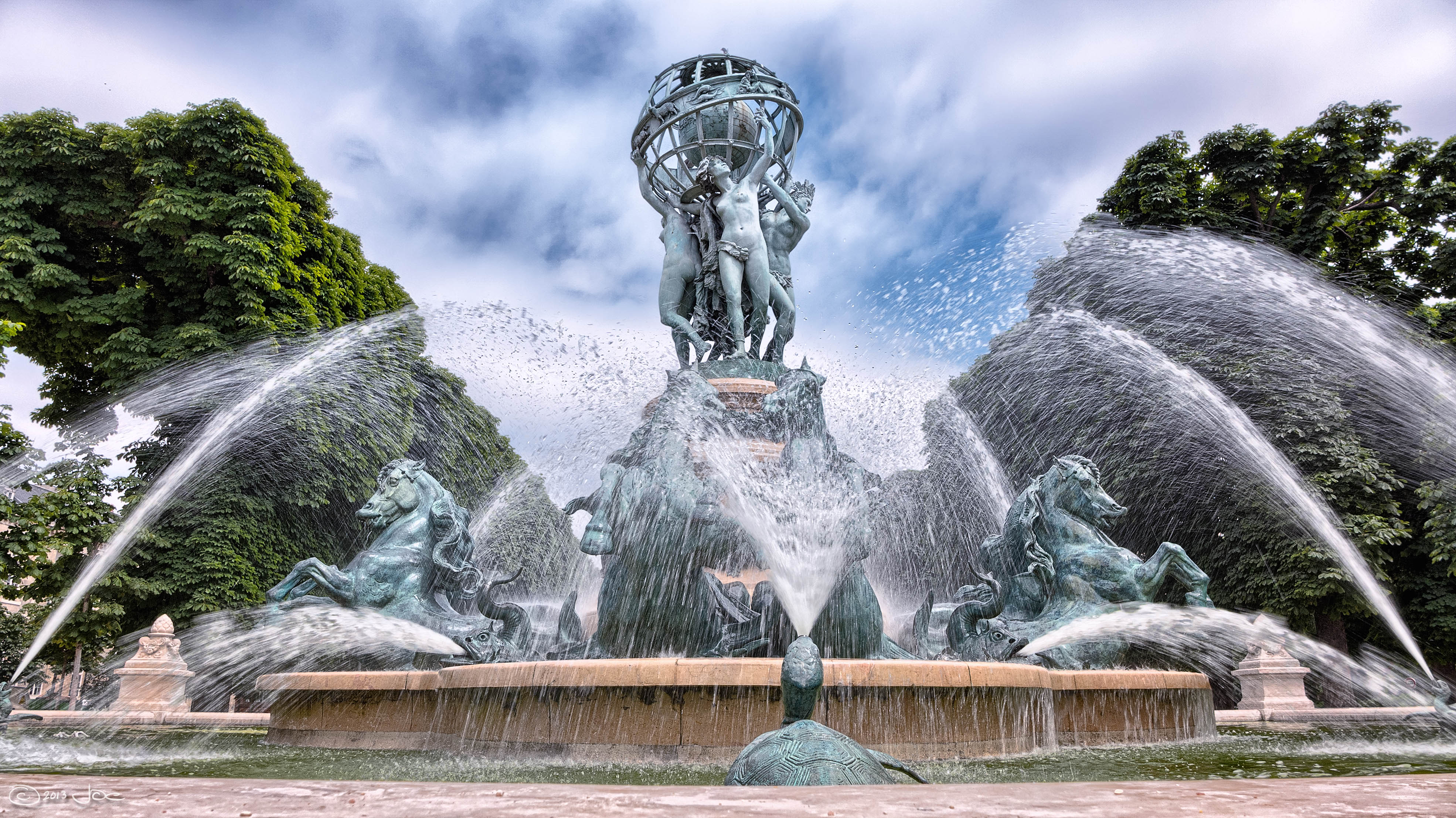
Fountain of the Four Parts of the World, at the Observatory

== See also ==
- Napoleon III style
- Fountains in Paris
- History of parks and gardens of Paris

== Further references ==
- Adolf K. Placzek, Macmillan Encyclopedia of Architects, Collier Macmillan, 1982, p. 504.
- Structurae entry
- Marcel Miocque; Huguette Vernochet; Alain Bertaud; Lise Dassonville-Agron (2001). Houlgate entre mer et campagne. Éditions Charles Corlet. p. 31. ISBN 2-85480-976-9.
