= Gao Hong (composer) =

American musician

- Chinese: 高虹
Transcriptions
Standard Mandarin
- Hanyu Pinyin: Gāo Hóng

Gao Hong (born 1964 in Luoyang, Henan) is a Chinese-American composer and performer of the Chinese pipa (pear-shaped lute). She serves as the professor of Chinese Musical Instruments at Carleton College in Northfield, Minnesota. She is the recipient of multiple music awards and has been honored by the Saint Paul, Minnesota Mayor Melvin Carter, who declared April 3, 2022 to be Gao Hong Day.

Gao has lived in the United States since 1994. She performs traditional and modern Chinese music, with her groups Spirit of Nature and Beijing Trio (a different group from the Beijing Trio which includes Max Roach, Jon Jang, and Jiebing Chen). She has also participated in cross-cultural musical collaborations, performing with jazz musicians and musicians from other cultures, including James Newton, Issam Rafea and Shubhendra Rao.

She is a graduate of the Central Conservatory of Music in Beijing, where she studied with the pipa master Lin Shicheng, of the Pudong School of pipa playing. She later became a pipa soloist for the Beijing Song and Dance Troupe. She is married to the American composer Paul Dice, and they live together in Eagan, Minnesota; they formerly lived in Burnsville, Minnesota.

== Discography ==
- Hunting Eagles Catching Swans - Music for Chinese pipa featuring pipa master Lin Shicheng & Gao Hong
- Hui/Gathering - Belladonna Baroque Quartet and Gao Hong
- Flying Dragon - Gao Hong and Friends around world
- Buddhist Temple Music from Beijing - The Beijing Trio.
- First Word - Speaking In Tongues
- The Spirit of Nature
- A Peacock Southeast Flew - Concerto for Pipa and Orchestra
- Quiet Forest, Flowing Stream - New Chinese Pipa Music by Gao Hong
- Pipa Potluck - Lutes Around the World - with an international cast of musicians including two Grammy winners and master performers on the oud, slack key guitar, banjo, classical guitar and others.
- Life As Is - The Blending of Ancient Souls from China and Syria, with Syrian oud player Issam Rafea.
- From Our World to Yours with Syrian oud player Issam Rafea.
- Terry Kunda with koro player Kadialy Kouyate

== Book ==
- Chinese Pipa Method - published 2016 by Hal Leonard

== See also ==
- World Voices
