= Baba Harballabh =

Swami Harballabh was a Hindustani classical vocalist and a saint. In 1875, he established the first Hindustani classical music festival in the world, known as Harballabh Sangeet Sammelan.

He was born to an affluent family at a village in Bajwara. He was a student of Swami Tulja Gir, who encouraged him to practice art and music.

Although Baba Harballabh came from a long line of saints who sang devotional songs, he went on to formal training under Pandit Duni Chand of Ujahan (now in Sialkot district) and maintained the guru-shishya parampara at Devi Talab, where scores of disciples learned the art from him and other masters.

Swami Harballabh had many disciples, and he attempted to instill a love of music in them. The place where Swami Hariballabh used to sing became a Kashi for musicians and players of classical music.

Baba Harballabh also translated Raag Darpan and wrote Sangeet Dapran.
