= Théâtre de la Ville =

Theatre in Paris, France

- Façade on the Place du Châtelet
- Interactive map of Théâtre de la Ville
- Former names: Théâtre Lyrique Impérial (1862); Théâtre Lyrique (1870–71); Théâtre Lyrique-Dramatique (1874); Théâtre Historique (1876); Théâtre des Nations (1879); Théâtre Lyrique (1887); Théâtre Sarah-Bernhardt (1898) or 1899; Théâtre de la Cité (1941); Théâtre Sarah-Bernhardt (1947); Théâtre des Nations (1957); Théâtre de la Ville (1968)
- Address: 2 Place du Châtelet, 4th arrondissement Paris
- Coordinates: 48°51′26″N 02°20′53″E
- Capacity: 1,750 (1868); 1,600 (1874)

Construction
- Opened: 30 October 1862; 21 May 1871 (destroyed by fire); 6 November 1874 (reopened)
- Architect: Gabriel Davioud

Website
- www.theatredelaville-paris.com/en

The Théâtre de la Ville (French pronunciation: [teɑtʁ d(ə) la vil]; "City Theatre") is one of the two theatres built in the 19th century by Gabriel Davioud at the request of Baron Haussmann at the Place du Châtelet, Paris, the other being the Théâtre du Châtelet. It is located at 2, Place du Châtelet in the 4th arrondissement.

Included among its many previous names are Théâtre Lyrique, Théâtre des Nations, and Théâtre Sarah-Bernhardt.

== Théâtre Lyrique ==
The theatre, which until the fall of Napoleon III in 1870 was officially known as the Théâtre Lyrique Impérial, was designed by the architect Gabriel Davioud for Baron Haussmann between 1860 and 1862 for the opera company more commonly known simply as the Théâtre Lyrique. That company's earlier theatre, the Théâtre Historique on the Boulevard du Temple, where it had performed since 1851, was slated for demolition as part of Haussmann's renovation of Paris.

During the company's initial period on the Place du Châtelet, it was under the direction of Léon Carvalho and gave the premieres of Bizet's Les pêcheurs de perles (1863), Berlioz's Les Troyens à Carthage (1863), Gounod's Mireille (1864), Bizet's La jolie fille de Perth (1867), and Gounod's Roméo et Juliette (1867). Carvalho also presented the first performance of Verdi's revised and expanded version of Macbeth (in French) in 1865.

Jules Pasdeloup took over as director in 1868 and gave the first Paris performances of Wagner's Rienzi in 1869.

The Théâtre Lyrique on the Place du Châtelet was nearly completely destroyed by fire on 21 May 1871 during the recapturing of Paris by the forces of Adolphe Thiers at the end of Paris Commune, and the Théâtre Lyrique opera company went bankrupt not long after.

== Théâtre Historique and Théâtre des Nations ==
The theatre was rebuilt in 1874 on the same plans and was at first called the Théâtre Lyrique-Dramatique, but was soon renamed to Théâtre Historique, which it retained until 1879, when it became Théâtre des Nations. Victor Maurel produced a season of Italian opera at the Théâtre des Nations in 1884. It included on 1 February 1884 the first Paris performance of Massenet's Hérodiade, in the Italian version entitled Erodiade. The cast included Fidès Devriès as Salomé, Guglielmina Tremelli as Hérodiade, Jean de Reszke as Jean, Maurel as Hérode, Édouard de Reszke as Phanuel, and Giuseppe Villani as Vitellius. In the tenth and final performance of Erodiade on 13 March three De Reszkes could be heard, as Josephine de Reszke sang Salomé.

== Opéra-Comique ==
In 1887 the Opéra-Comique moved into the theatre after its previous home, the second Salle Favart, had been destroyed by fire. The name Théâtre Lyrique was restored, and the Opéra-Comique continued to perform in the theatre until 1898, when it returned to the newly built, third Salle Favart. During the company's sojourn on the Place du Châtelet, it gave the premiere of Edouard Lalo's Le roi d'Ys (1888) and presented several operas by Massenet, including the premieres of Esclarmonde (1889) and Sapho (1897), as well as the first Paris performances of Werther (6 January 1893) and La Navarraise (3 October 1895).

== Théâtre Sarah-Bernhardt ==
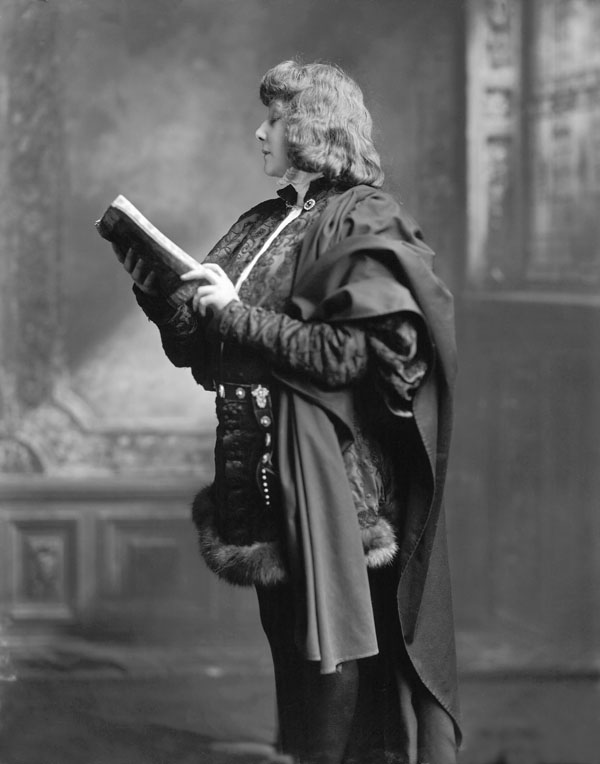
Sarah Bernhardt as Hamlet (1899)

In 1899 the theatre was renamed Théâtre Sarah-Bernhardt after the renowned actress Sarah Bernhardt, who produced there from 1899 for nearly two decades. She opened with a revival of one of her great roles, Victorien Sardou's La Tosca. Other productions included a revival of Edmond Rostand's La Samaritaine and the premiere of his L'Aiglon in which she played Napoleon's son (the Duke of Reichstadt). Another well known breeches part was the title role of Marcel Schwob's adaptation of Hamlet. After her death in 1923 the theatre continued under her son Maurice for several years, until his death in 1928.

The theatre kept the name Sarah Bernhardt until the Occupation of France by the Germans in World War II, when the name was changed to Théâtre de la Cité because of Bernhardt's Jewish ancestry, until 1947, when it reverted to Sarah-Bernhardt.

Diaghilev's Ballets Russes presented several premieres at the Théâtre Sarah-Bernhardt, including Stravinsky's Apollon musagète (12 June 1928) and the revised Renard (21 May 1929; with choreography by Serge Lifar), and two ballets by Prokoviev, Le pas d'acier (27 May 1927) and Le Fils prodigue (21 May 1929).

== Théâtre des Nations ==
The theatre was once again renamed as the Théâtre des Nations in 1957.

== Théâtre de la Ville ==
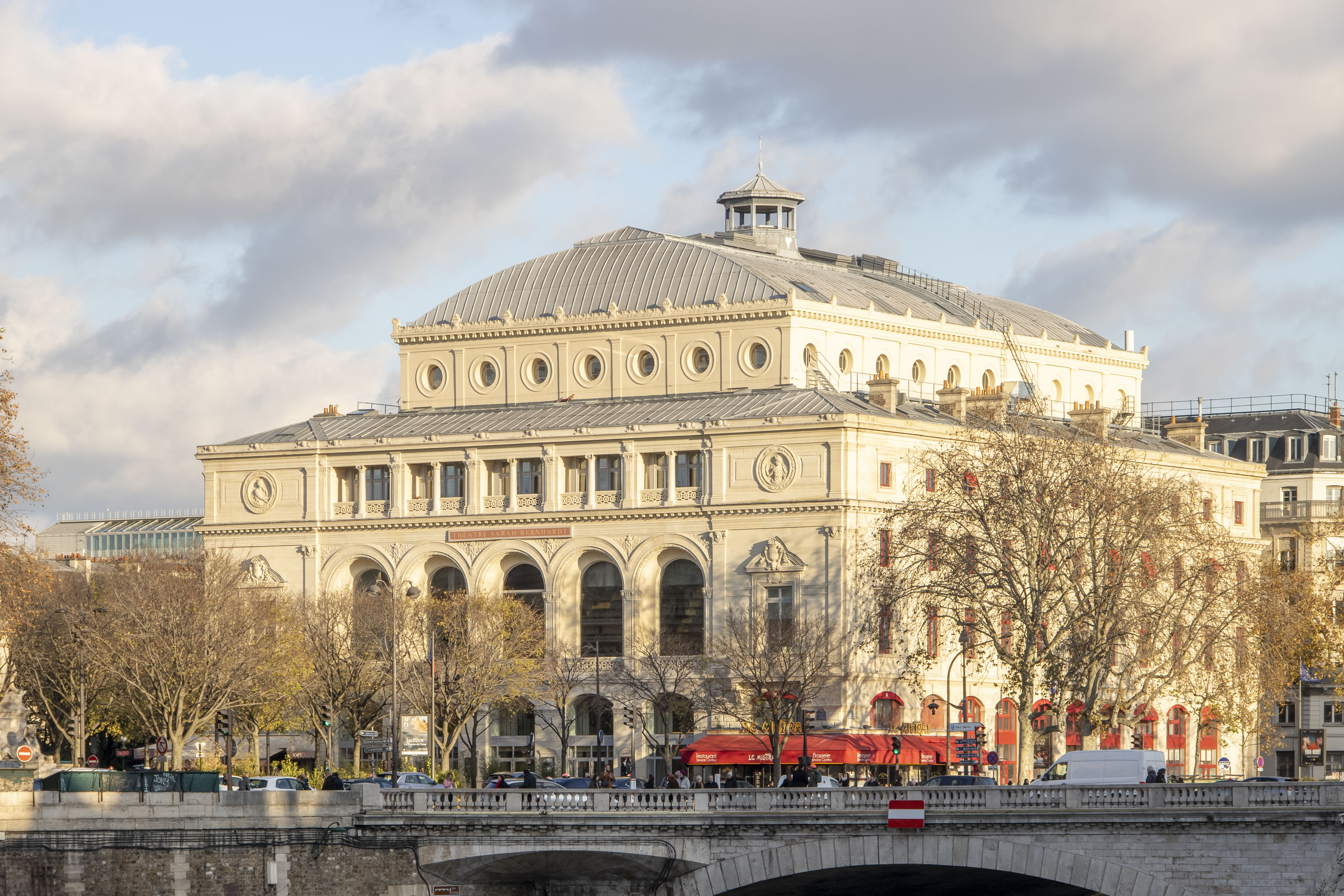
Théâtre Sarah-Bernhardt

The theatre first acquired the name Théâtre de la Ville in 1968. Since the late 1970s the institution, under the direction of Jean Mercure (1968–1985) then of Gérard Violette (1985–2008), has been internationally recognised for its contemporary dance productions and has showcased major choreographers such as Pina Bausch, Anne Teresa De Keersmaeker, Jan Fabre, Sankai Juku, Sidi Larbi Cherkaoui, Merce Cunningham and Carolyn Carlson and Bella Lewitzky.
