= Tamil culture =

Tamil culture dates back thousands of years. The Tamil people speak the Tamil language, one of the classical languages of India. Archaeological evidence from the Tamilakam region indicates a continuous history of human occupation for more than 3,800 years. Historically, the region was inhabited by Tamil-speaking people. It was ruled by various kingdoms such as the Sangam period (3rd century BCE to 3rd century CE) triumvirate of the Cheras, Cholas and Pandyas, the Pallavas (3rd–9th century CE), and the later Vijayanagara Empire (14th–17th century CE). European colonization began in the 17th century CE, and continued for two centuries until the Indian Independence in 1947. Due to its long history, the culture has seen multiple influences over the years and have developed diversely.

The Tamils had outside contact in the form of diplomatic and trade relations with other kingdoms to the north and with the Romans since the Sangam era. The conquests of Tamil kings in the 10th century CE resulted in Tamil culture spreading to South and Southeast Asia. Tamils form the majority in the South Indian state of Tamil Nadu and a significant portion of northern Sri Lanka. Tamils have migrated world-wide since the 19th century CE and a significant population exists in Sri Lanka, South Africa, Mauritius, Reunion Island, Fiji, as well as other regions such as the Southeast Asia, Middle East, Caribbean and parts of the Western World.

== History ==
Tamilakam was the region inhabited by the ancient Tamil people. While archaeological evidence points to hominids inhabiting the region nearly 400 millennia ago, it has been inhabited by modern humans continuously for more than 3,800 years. Excavations at Keezhadi have revealed urban settlements dating to the 6th century BCE. The Tamilakam region has been ruled over by many kingdoms, major of which are the Sangam era (3rd century BCE to 3rd century CE) rulers of the Chera, Chola, and Pandya clans, the Pallavas (3rd–9th century CE), and the later Vijayanagara Empire (14th–17th century CE). The kingdoms had significant diplomatic and trade contacts with other kingdoms to the north and with the Romans. In the 11th century CE, the Chola empire expanded with the conquests of parts of present-day Sri Lanka and Maldives, and increased influence across the Indian Ocean with contacts in Southeast Asia. This resulted in Tamil influence spreading to the regions.

Before mid 20th century, the regions populated by Tamils were under European colonization for more than two centuries. During the European occupation, Tamils migrated and settled in various regions across the globe. This resulted in significant Tamil population in Southeast Asia, Caribbean, South Africa, Mauritius, Seychelles and Fiji. Since the 20th century, Tamils have migrated to other regions such as Middle East and the Western World for employment. Tamils form the majority in the South Indian state of Tamil Nadu and in northern and eastern provinces of Sri Lanka.

== Language ==
Tamil written in Tamil script

Tamil people speak Tamil, which belongs to the Dravidian languages and is one of the oldest Classical language of India. According to epigraphist Iravatham Mahadevan, the rudimentary Tamil Brahmi script originated in South India in the 3rd century BCE. Though the old Tamil preserved features of Proto-Dravidian language, modern-day spoken Tamil uses loanwords from other languages such as English. The existent Tamil grammar is largely based on the grammar book Naṉṉūl which incorporates facets from the old Tamil literary work Tolkāppiyam. The Tamil grammar is classified into five divisions, namely eḻuttu (letter), sol (word), poruḷ (content), yāppu (prosody), and aṇi (figure of speech). Since the later part of the 19th century, Tamils made the language as a key part of the Tamil identity and personified the language in the form of Tamil Thai ("Tamil mother"). Various varieties of Tamil is spoken across regions such as Madras Bashai, Kongu Tamil, Madurai Tamil, Nellai Tamil, Kumari Tamil and various Sri Lankan Tamil dialects such as Batticaloa Tamil, Jaffna Tamil and Negombo Tamil in Sri Lanka.

== Literature ==
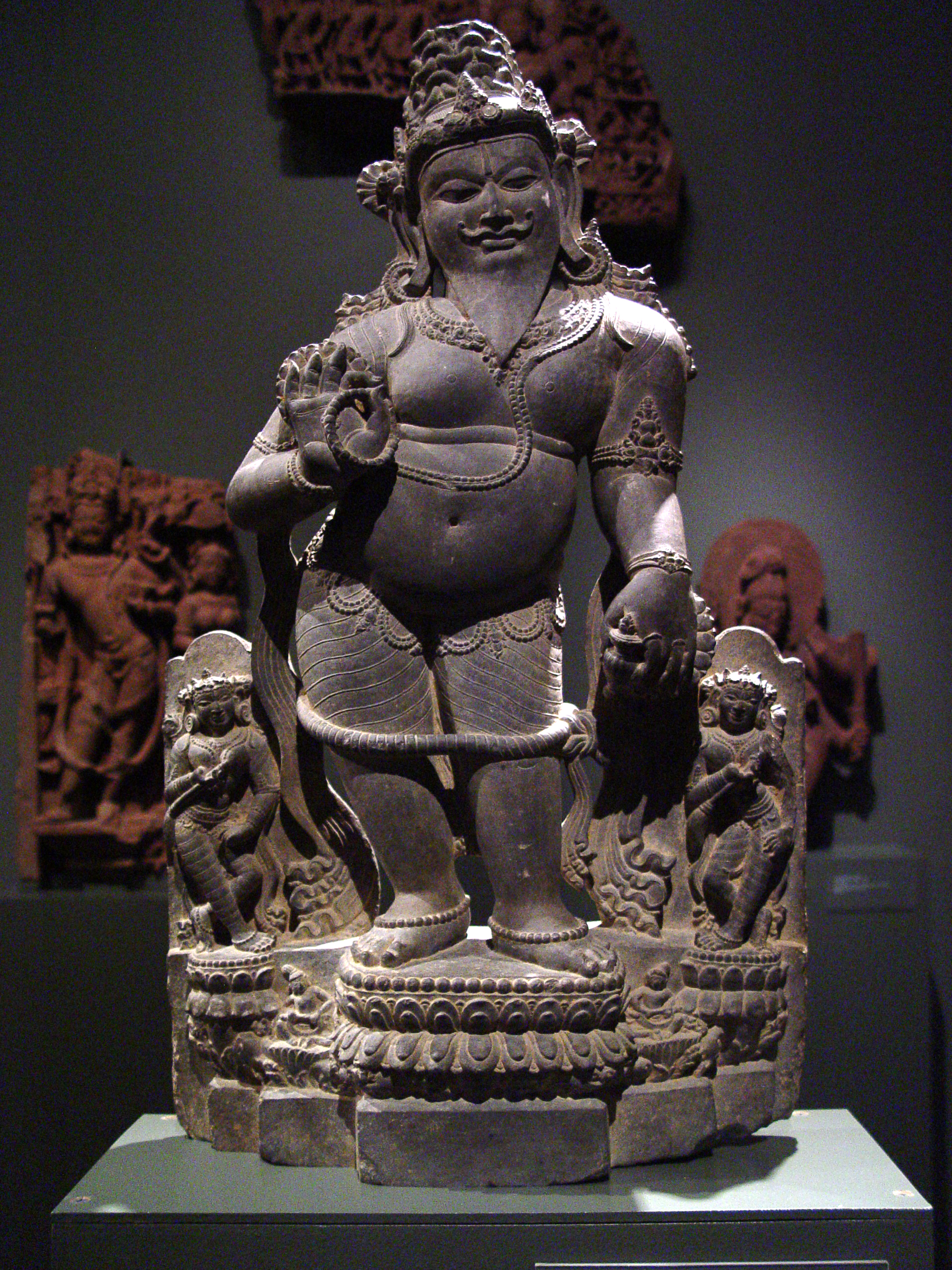
Agathiar, poet from the first Sangam period

Tamil literature is of considerable antiquity compared to the contemporary literature from other Indian languages and represents one of the oldest bodies of literature in South Asia. The earliest epigraphic records have been dated to around the 3rd century BCE. Early Tamil literature was composed in three successive poetic assemblies known as Tamil Sangams, the earliest of which destroyed by floods. The Sangam literature was broadly classified into three divisions: iyal (poetry), isai (music) and nadagam (drama). There are no surviving works from the later two categories and literature from the first category were further classified into illakkanam (grammar) and ilakkiyam (poetry). The sangam literature was broadly based on two genres, akam (internal) and puram (external) described on the five landscapes.

The oldest surviving book is the Tolkappiyam, a treatise on Tamil grammar. The early Tamil literature was compiled and classified into two categories: Patinenmelkanakku ("Eighteen Greater Texts") consisting of the Ettuttokai ("Eight Anthologies") and the Pattuppattu ("Ten Idylls"), and the Patinenkilkanakku ("Eighteen Lesser Texts"). The Tamil literature that followed in the next 300 years after the Sangam period is generally called the "post-Sangam" literature which included the Five Great Epics and the Five Minor Epics. Another book of the post Sangam era is the Tirukkural, a book on ethics, by Thiruvalluvar.

In the beginning of the Middle Ages, Vaishnava and Shaivite literature became prominent following the Bhakti movement in 7th century CE with hymns composed by Alwars and Nayanmars. Notable work from the post-Bhakti period included Ramavataram by Kambar in 12th century CE and Tiruppugal by Arunagirinathar in 15th century CE. In 1578, the Portuguese published a Tamil book in old Tamil script named Thambiraan Vanakkam, thus making Tamil the first Indian language to be printed and published. Tamil Lexicon, published by the University of Madras between 1924 and 1939, was amongst the first comprehensive dictionaries published in the language. The 19th century gave rise to Tamil Renaissance and writings and poems by authors such as Meenakshi Sundaram Pillai, U.V.Swaminatha Iyer, Damodaram Pillai, V. Kanakasabhai and others. During the Indian Independence Movement, many Tamil poets and writers sought to provoke national spirit, notably Bharathiar and Bharathidasan.

== Art and architecture ==
According to Tamil literature, there are 64 art forms called aayakalaigal. The art is classified into two broad categories: kavin kalaigal (beautiful art forms) which include architecture, sculpture, painting and poetry and nun kalaigal (fine art forms) which include dance, music and drama.

=== Architecture ===
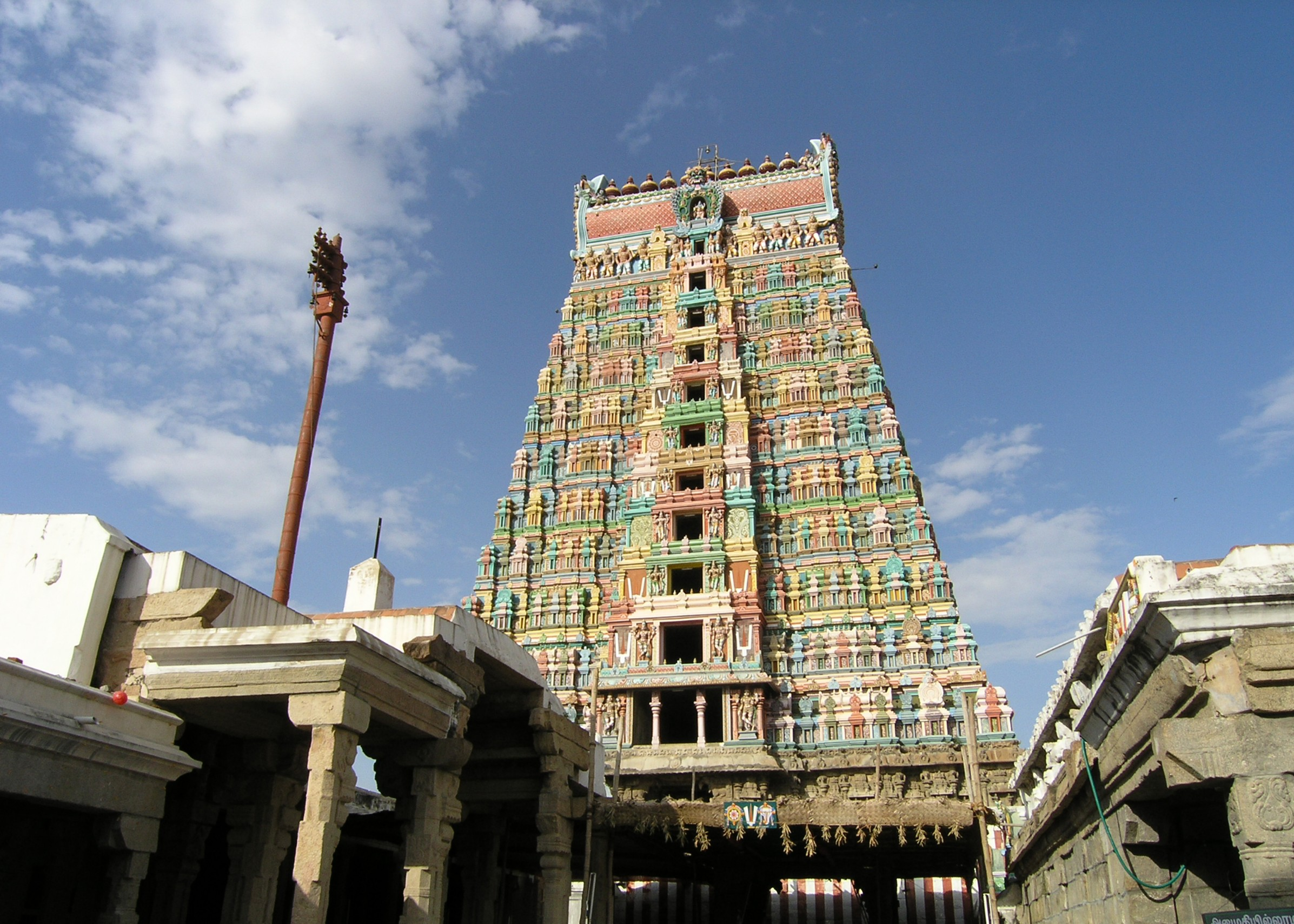
The large gopuram is a hallmark of Dravidian architecture

Dravidian architecture style of temple architecture consisted of a central sanctum (garbhagriha) topped by pyramidal tower or vimana, porches or mantapas preceding the door leading to the sanctum and large gate-pyramids or gopurams on the quadrangular enclosures that surround the temple. Besides these, they consisted of large pillared halls and one or more water tanks or wells. The gopuram is a monumental tower, usually ornate at the entrance of the temple forms a prominent feature of Hindu temples of the Dravidian style. They are topped by kalasams (finials) and function as gateways through the walls that surround the temple complex.

There are a number of early rock-cut cave-temples established by the various Tamil kingdoms. The Group of Monuments at Mahabalipuram, built by the Pallavas in the 7th and 8th centuries has more than forty rock-cut temples, monoliths and rock reliefs. The Pallavas, who built the group of monuments in Mahabalipuram and Kanchipuram, were one of the earliest patronisers of the Dravidian architectural style. These gateways became regular features in the Cholas and the Pandya architecture, was later expanded by the Vijayanagara and the Nayaks and spread to other parts such as Sri Lanka. Madurai (also called as "Temple city"), which hosts many temples including the massive Meenakshi Amman Temple and Kanchipuram, considered as one of the seven great holy cities are amongst the notable centres of Dravidian architecture. The Srirangam Ranganathaswamy Temple, which is amongst the biggest functioning Hindu temples in the world, has a 236 feet (72 m) high Rajagopuram. The state emblem also features the Lion Capital of Ashoka with an image of a Gopuram on the background.

Vimana, which are similar structures built over the inner sanctum of the temple are usually smaller than the gopurams in the Dravidian architecture with a few exceptions such as the Brihadisvara Temple in Thanjavur. There are more than 34,000 temples in Tamil Nadu built across various periods some of which are several centuries old. The influence of Tamil culture had led to the construction of various temples outside India by the Tamil dispora.

The Mugal influence in medieval times and the British influence later gave rise to a blend of Hindu, Islamic and Gothic revival styles, resulting in the distinct Indo-Saracenic architecture with several institutions during the British era following the style. By the early 20th century, the art deco made its entry upon in the urban landscape. In the later part of the century, the architecture witnessed a rise in the modern concrete buildings.

=== Sculpture and paintings ===
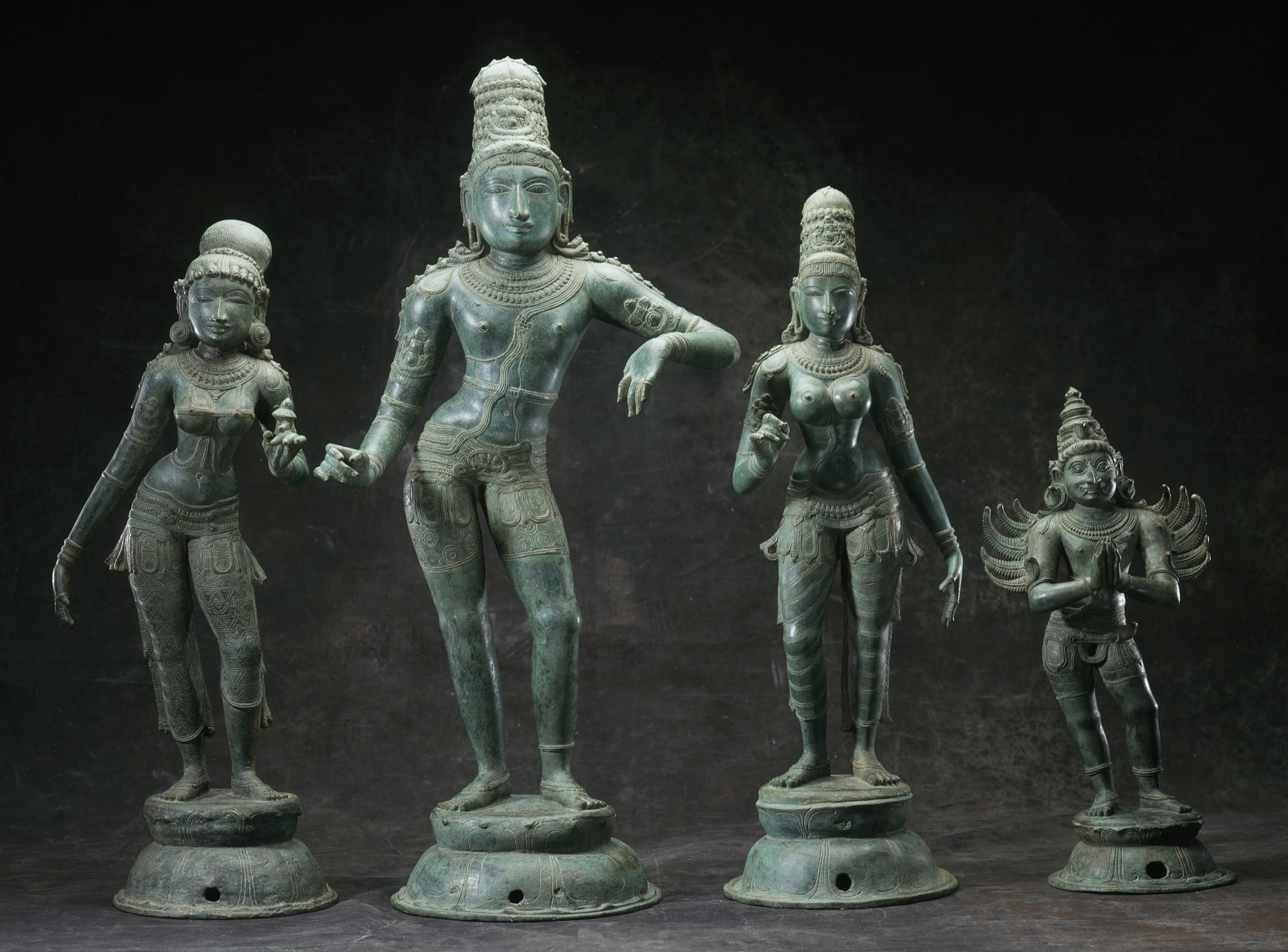
Krishna with Rukmini and Satyabhama and his mount Garuda (12th–13th century CE)

Tamil sculpture ranges from stone sculptures in temples, to detailed bronze icons. The bronze statues of the Cholas are considered to be one of the greatest contributions of Tamil art. Models made of a special mixture of beeswax and sal tree resin were encased in clay and fired to melt the wax leaving a hollow mould, which would then be filled with molten metal and cooled to produce bronze statues.

Tamil paintings are usually centered around natural, religious or aesthetic themes. Sittanavasal is a rock-cut monastery and temple attributed to Pandyas and Pallavas which consist of frescoes and murals from the 7th century CE, painted with vegetable and mineral dyes in over a thin wet surface of lime plaster. Similar murals are found in temple walls, the most notable examples are the murals on the Ranganathaswamy Temple at Srirangam and the Brihadeeswarar temple at Thanjavur. One of the major forms of Tamil painting is Thanjavur painting, which originated in the 16th century CE where a base made of cloth and coated with zinc oxide is painted using dyes and then decorated with semi-precious stones, as well as silver or gold threads.

=== Music ===
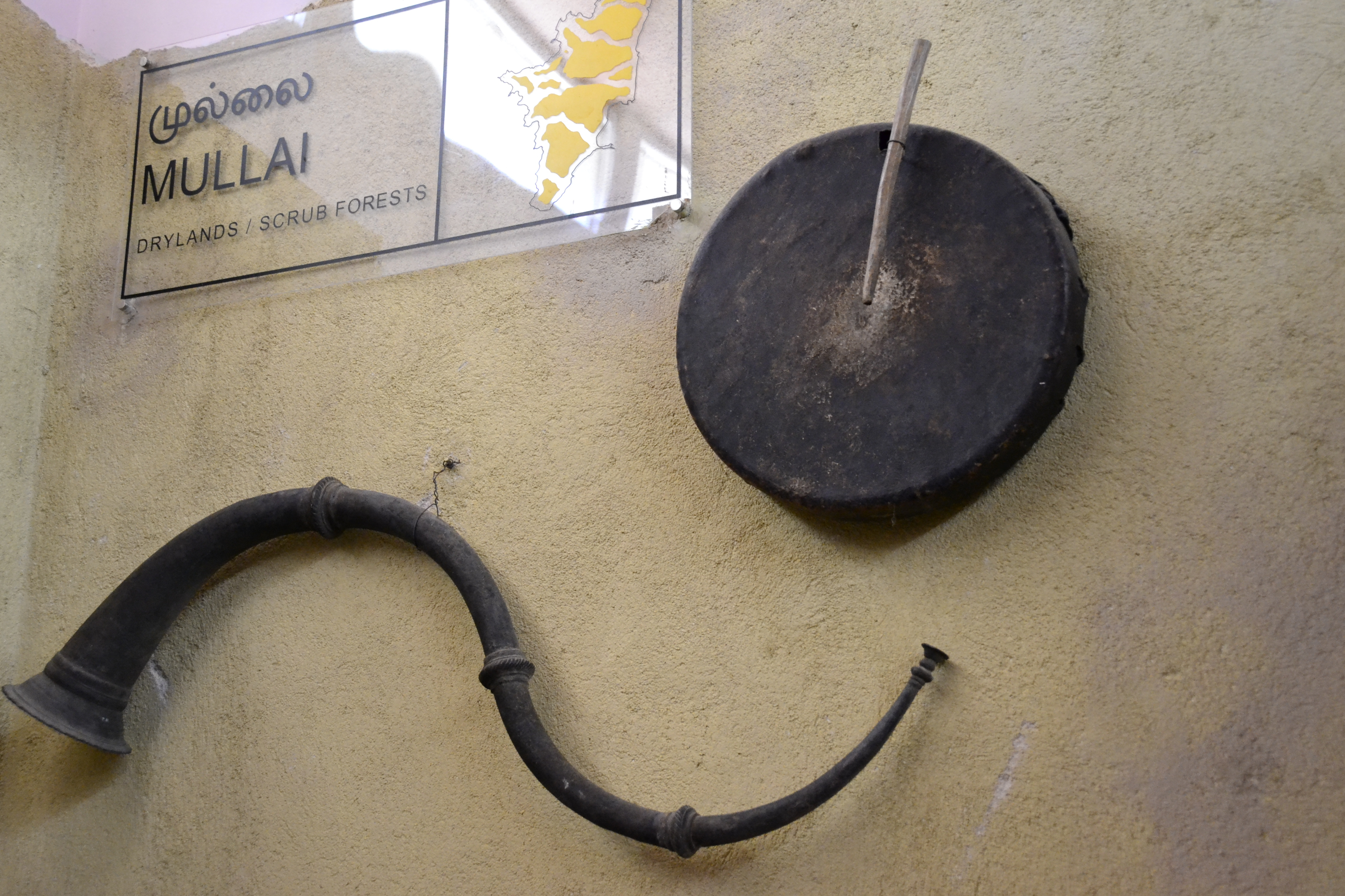
Tharai and Thappattai, traditional music instruments

The ancient Tamil country had its own system of music called Tamil Pannisai. Sangam literature such as the Silappatikaram from 2nd century CE describes music notes and instruments. A Pallava inscription dated to the 7th century CE has one of the earliest surviving examples of Indian music in notation. The Pallava inscriptions from the period describe the playing of string instrument veena as a form of exercise for the fingers and the practice of singing musical hymns (Thirupadigam) in temples. From the 9th century CE, Shaivite hymns Thevaram and Vaishnavite hymns (Tiruvaymoli) were sung along with playing of musical instruments. Carnatic music originated later which included rhythmic and structured music by composers such Thyagaraja, Muthuswami Dikshitar, and Shyama Shastri. Villu Paatu is an ancient form of musical story-telling method where narration is interspersed with music played from a string bow and accompanying instruments. Gaana, a combination of various folk musics is sung mainly in Chennai.

There are many traditional instruments from the region dating back to the Sangam period such as parai, tharai, yazh, and murasu. Nadaswaram, a reed instrument that is often accompanied by the thavil, a type of drum instrument are the major musical instruments used in temples and weddings. Melam is from a group of percussion instruments from the ancient Tamilakam which are played during events and functions.

Tyagaraja Aradhana is an annual music festival conducted in Tiruvaiyaru, devoted to composer Tyagaraja where thousands of music artists congregate every year. In the Tamil month of Margazhi, music concerts (katcheris) are generally conducted, popular of which include the Madras Music Season by the Madras Music Academy and Chennaiyil Thiruvaiyaru.

=== Dance ===
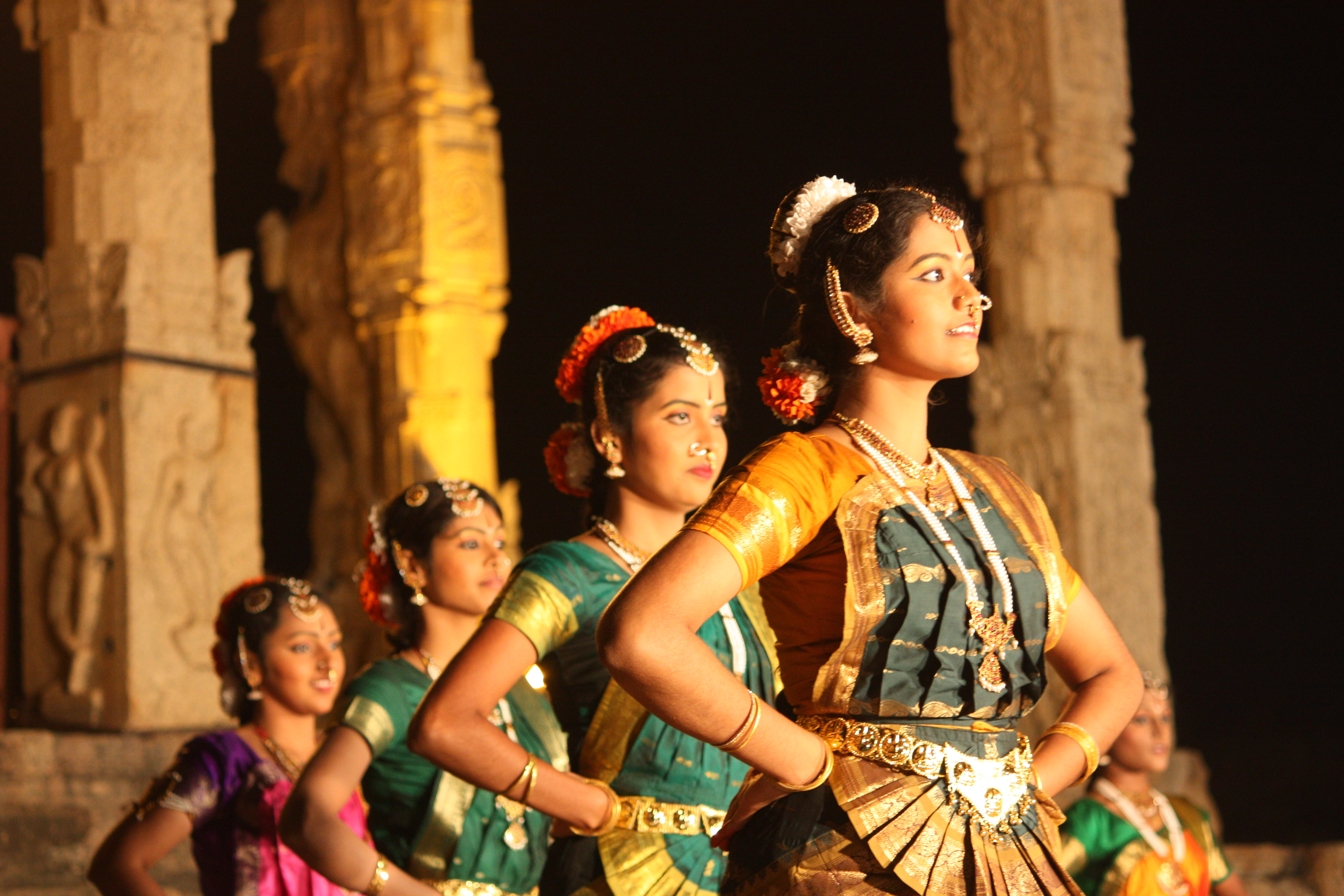
A Bharatanatyam performance

Bharatanatyam is a major genre of Indian classical dance that originated from Tamil Nadu and practiced till today. It is one of the oldest classical dance forms of India. The dancer is usually dressed in a colorful silk sari with various jewelry, special anklets called salangai made up of small bells and hair plaited in a specific manner, decorated with flowers in a pattern called veni. The dance is characterized by flexing of torso with bent legs or flexed out knees combined with various footwork and a number of gestures known as abhinaya using various hand mudras, expressions using the eyes and other face muscles.

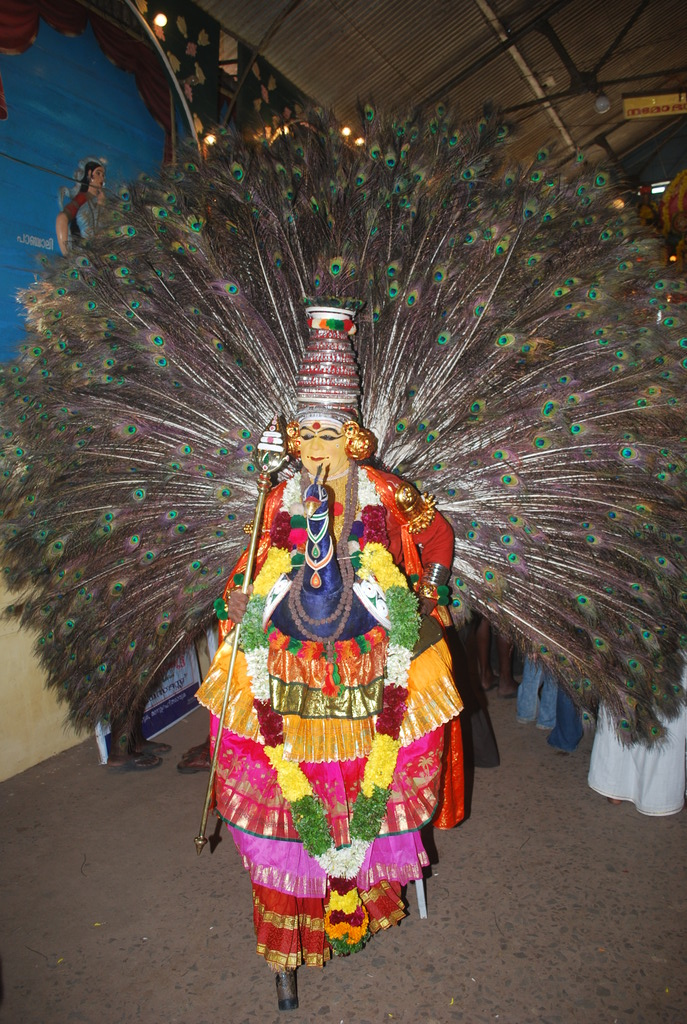
A Mayilattam folk dancer

There are many folk dance forms that originated and are practiced in the region. Karakattam involves dancers balancing decorated pot(s) on the head while making dance movements with the body. Kavadiattam is part of a ceremonial act of sacrifice, wherein the dancers bear a kavadi, an arch shaped wooden stick balanced on the shoulders with weights on both the ends. Kolattam is usually performed by women in which two small sticks (kols) are crisscrossed to make specific rhythms while singing songs. Kummi is similar to Kolattam, with the difference being that hands are used to make sounds while dancing instead of sticks used in the later. In Mayilattam, dancers dressed like peacocks with peacock feathers and headdresses perform movements to various folk songs and tunes while trying to imitate the movements of a peacock.

Oyilattam, a traditional war dance where few men wearing ankle bells would stand in a line with pieces of colored cloth perform rhythmic steps to the accompanying music. Paampu attam is a snake dance performed by young girls, who wear specifically designed costumes like a snake skin and emulate movements of a snake. Paraiattam is a traditional dance that involves dancing while playing the parai, an ancient percussion instrument. Puliyattam is performed by male dancers who paint themselves in yellow and black and wear masks, fuzzy ears, paws, fangs and a tail, and perform movements imitating a tiger. Puravaiattam involves dancers getting into a wooden frame designed like the body of a horse on his/her hips and make prancing movements. Other folk dances include Bhagavatha nadanam, Chakkaiattam, Devarattam, Kai silambattam, Kuravanji, Sevaiattam and Urumiattam.

=== Performance arts ===
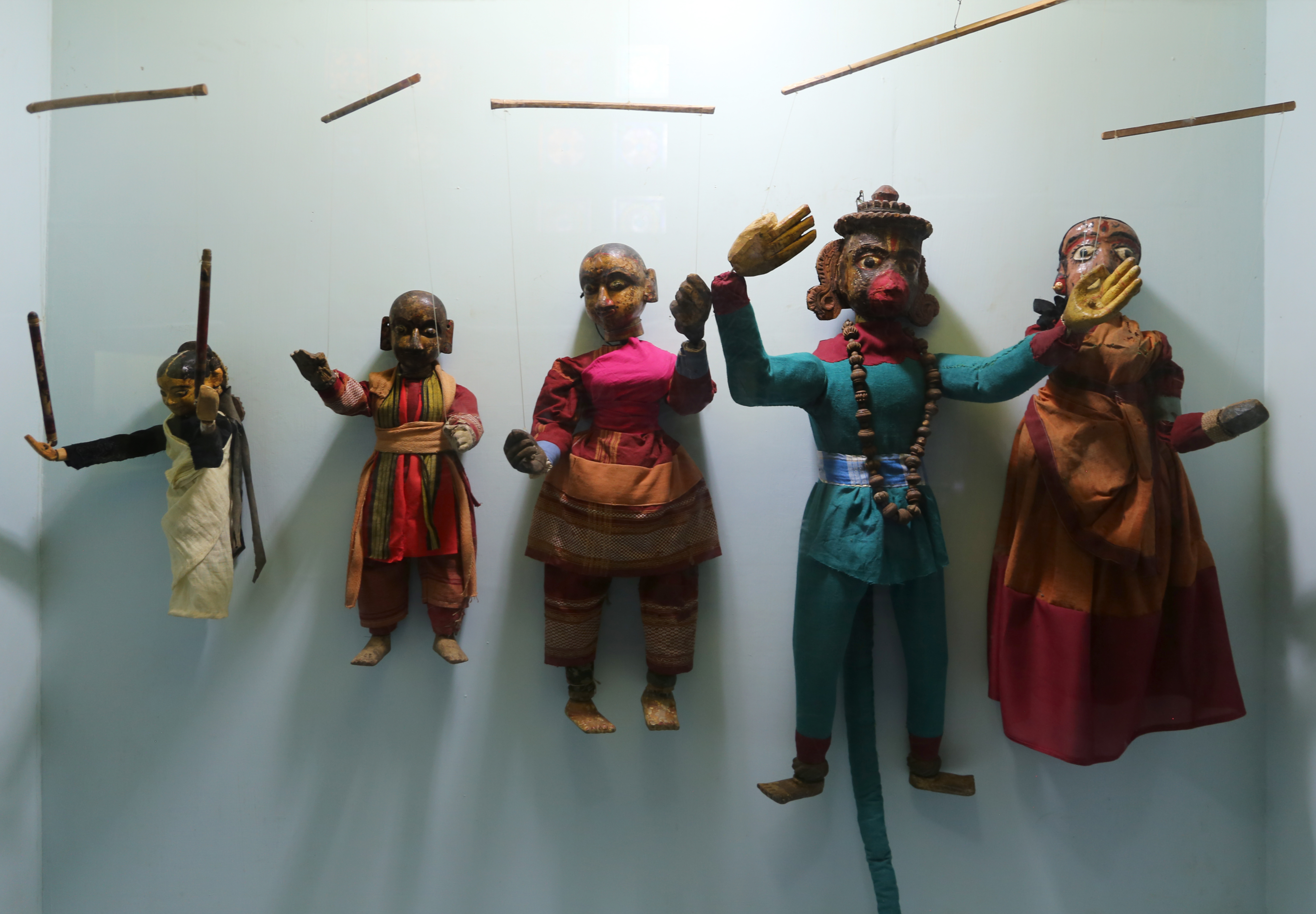
Doll marionettes used in Bommalattam

Koothu is a form of street theater that consists of a play performance which consists of dance along with music, narration and singing. The performers wear elaborate wooden headgear, special costumes with swirling skirts, ornaments such as heavy anklets along with prominent face painting and make-up. The art is performed during festivals in open public places and is usually dedicated to goddesses such as Mariamman or Draupadi with stories drawn from Hindu epics, mythology and folklore. The dance is accompanied by music played from traditional instruments and a kattiyakaran narrates the story during the performance.

Bommalattam is a type of puppetry that uses various doll marionettes manipulated by rods and strings attached to them. The puppeteers operate the puppets behind a screen illuminated by oil lamps and wear bells which are sounded along with the movements with background music played by traditional instruments. The themes are drawn from various Hindu scriptures such as the Puranas and epics and/with local folklore. Chennai Sangamam is a large annual open Tamil cultural festival held in Chennai with the intention of rejuvenating the old village festivals, art and artists.

=== Martial arts ===
Silambam is an ancient martial art form

Silambam is a martial art using a long staff of about 168 cm (66 in) in length, often made of wood such as bamboo. It was used for self-defense and to ward off animals and later evolved into a martial art and dance form. Adimurai (or Kuttu varisai) is a martial art specializing in empty-hand techniques and application on vital points of the body. Varma kalai is a Tamil traditional art of vital points which combines alternative medicine and martial arts, attributed to sage Agastiyar and might form part of the training of other martial arts such as silambattam, adimurai or kalari. Malyutham is the traditional form of combat-wrestling.

Tamil martial arts uses various types of weapons such as valari (iron sickle), maduvu (deer horns), vaal (sword) and kedayam (shield), surul vaal (curling blade), itti or vel (spear), savuku (whip), kattari (fist blade), aruval (mchete), silambam (bamboo staff), kuttu katai (spiked knuckleduster), kathi (dagger), vil ambu (bow and arrow), tantayutam (mace), soolam (trident), valari (boomerang), chakaram (discus) and theepandam (flaming baton). Since the early Sangam age, war was regarded as an honourable sacrifice and fallen heroes and kings were worshipped with hero stones and heroic martyrdom was glorified in ancient Tamil literature.

=== Modern arts ===
Tamil Nadu is also home to the Tamil film industry nicknamed as Kollywood and is one of the largest industries of film production in India. The term Kollywood is a blend of Kodambakkam and Hollywood. Samikannu Vincent, who had built the first cinema of South India in Coimbatore, introduced the concept of "Tent Cinema" in the early 1900s, in which a tent was erected on a stretch of open land close to a town or village to screen the films. The first of its kind was established in Madras, called "Edison's Grand Cinemamegaphone". The first silent film in South India was produced in Tamil in 1916 and the first Tamil talkie film was Kalidas, which released on 31 October 1931, barely seven months after the release of India's first talking picture Alam Ara.

== Clothing ==
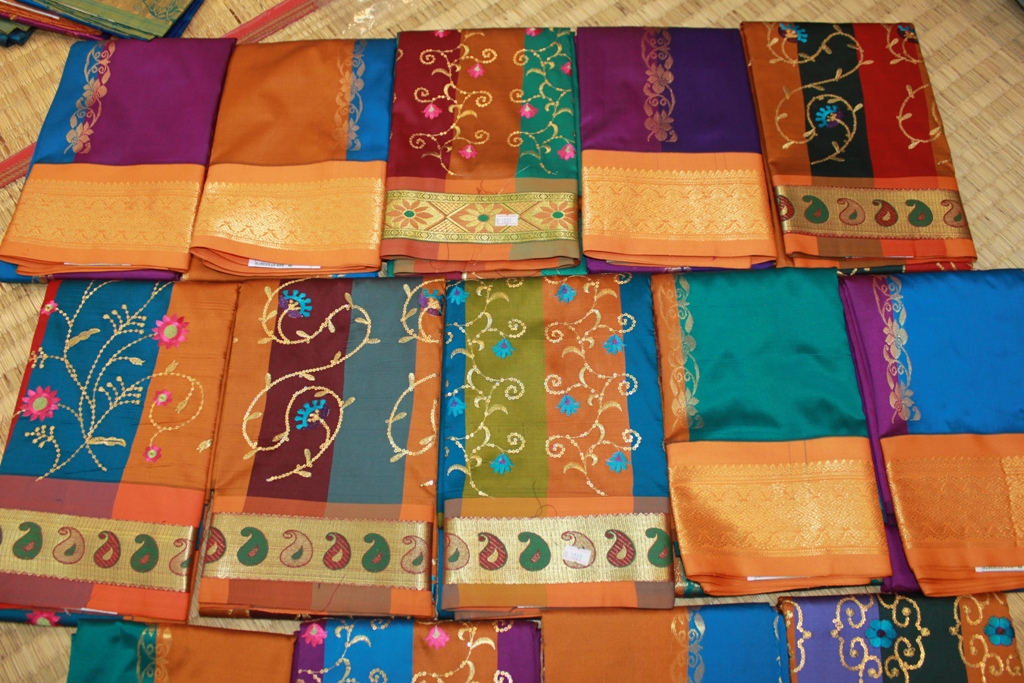
Kanchipuram silk saris worn by women on special occasions

Ancient literature and epigraphical records describe the various types of dresses. Tamil women traditionally wear a sari, a garment that consists of a drape varying from 4.6 m (15 ft) to 8.2 m (27 ft) in length and 0.61 m (2 ft) to 1.2 m (4 ft) in breadth that is typically wrapped around the waist, with one end draped over the shoulder, baring the midriff. Women wear colourful silk sarees on traditional occasions. Young girls wear a long skirt called pavaadai along with a shorter length sari called dhavani. Kanchipuram silk sari is a type of silk sari made in the Kanchipuram region in Tamil Nadu and these saris are worn as bridal & special occasion saris by most women in South India. It has been recognized as a Geographical indication by the Government of India in 2005–2006. Kovai Cora cotton is a specific type of cotton saree made in the Coimbatore region.

The men wear a veshti, a rectangular piece of non-stitched cloth, of varying lengths, that is wrapped around the legs and knotted at the waist. It is often white, bordered in brightly coloured stripes. The style of draping might vary between communities, and men sometimes wear a hip belt to hold the veshti in place. Traditional attire includes a dhoti, a costume similar to veshti, which is a long, white rectangular piece of non-stitched cloth, that is wrapped around the waist, looped around the legs (similar to trousers) and knotted at the waist. A lungi, which is similar to a veshti but made tubular with the ends stitched together, designed with colourful batik patterns, is a common form of male attire in the countryside. People in urban areas generally wear tailored clothing, and western dress is popular. Western-style school uniforms are worn by both boys and girls in schools, even in rural areas.

== Calendar ==
The Tamil calendar is a sidereal solar calendar. The Tamil Panchangam is based on the same and is generally used in contemporary times to check auspicious times for cultural and religious events. The calendar follows a 60-year cycle. There are 12 months in a year starting with Chithirai when the Sun enters the first Rāśi and the number of days in a month varies between 29 and 32. The new year starts following the March equinox in the middle of April. The days of week (kiḻamai) in the Tamil calendar relate to the celestial bodies in the solar system: Sun, Moon, Mars, Mercury, Jupiter, Venus, and Saturn, in that order.

== Food and hospitality ==
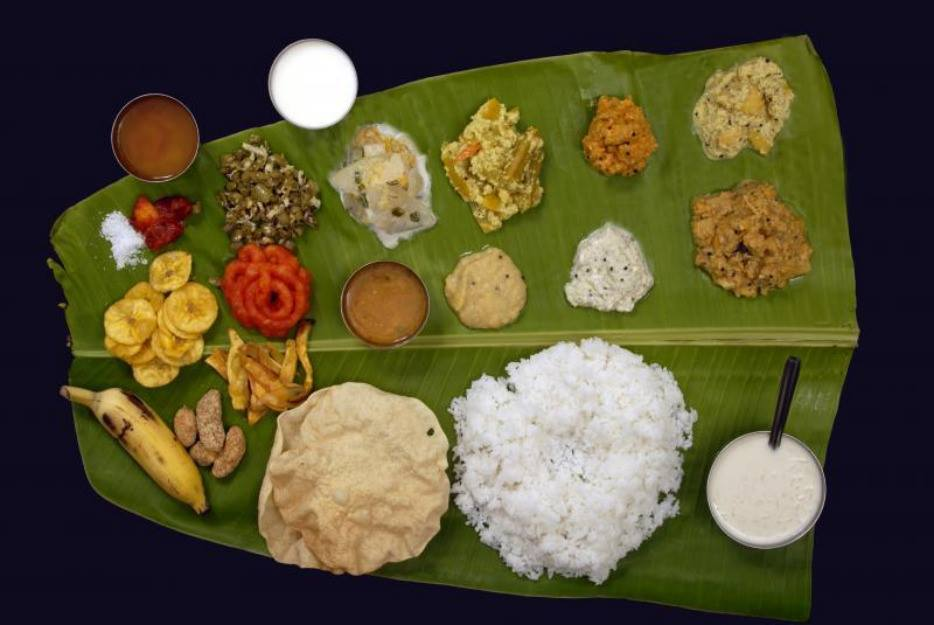
A traditional meal served on a banana leaf

Hospitality is a major feature of Tamil culture. It was considered as a social obligation and offering food to guests was regarded as one of the highest virtues. Rice is the diet staple and is served with sambar, rasam, and poriyal as a part of a Tamil meal. Bananas find mention in the Sangam literature and the traditional way of eating a meal involves having the food served on a banana leaf, which is discarded after the meal. Eating on banana leaves imparts a unique flavor to the food, and is considered healthy. Food is usually eaten seated on the floor and the finger tips of the right hand is used to take the food to the mouth.

There are regional sub-varieties namely Chettinadu, Kongunadu, Nanjilnadu, Pandiyanadu and Sri Lankan Tamil cuisines. There are both vegetarian and meat dishes with fish traditionally consumed across the coast and other meat preferred in the interiors. The Chettinadu cuisine is popular for its meat based dishes and generous usage of spices. The Kongunadu cuisine uses less spices and are generally cooked fresh. It uses coconut, sesame seeds, groundnut, and turmeric to go with various cereals and pulses grown in the region. Nanjilnadu cuisine is milder and is usually based on fish and vegetables. Sri Lankan Tamil cuisine uses gingelly oil and jaggery along with coconut and spices, which differentiates it from the other culinary traditions in the island. Biryani is a popular dish with several different versions prepared across various regions. Idli, and dosa are popular breakfast dishes and other dishes cooked by to the Tamil people include upma, idiappam, pongal, paniyaram, and parotta.

== Medicine ==
Siddha medicine is a form of traditional medicine originating from the Tamils and is one of the oldest systems of medicine in India. The word literally means perfection in Tamil and the system focuses on wholesome treatment based on various factors. As per Tamil tradition, the knowledge of Siddha medicine came from Shiva, which was passed on to 18 holy men known as Siddhar led by Agastya. The knowledge was then passed on orally and through palm leaf manuscripts to the later generations. Siddha practitioners believe that all objects including the human body is composed of five basic elements – earth, water, fire, air, sky which are present in food and other compounds, which is used as the basis for the drugs and other therapies.

== Festivals ==
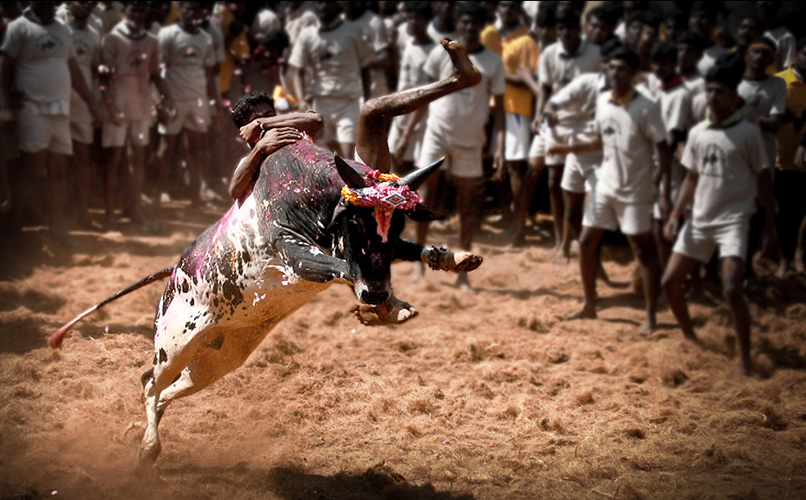
Jallikattu, a traditional bull taming event held during Pongal festivities, attracts huge crowds

Pongal is a major and multi-day harvest festival celebrated by Tamils in the month of Thai according to the Tamil solar calendar (usually falls on 14 or 15 January). It is dedicated to the Surya, the Sun God and the festival is named after the ceremonial "Pongal", which means "to boil, overflow" and refers to the traditional dish prepared from the new harvest of rice boiled in milk with jaggery offered to Surya. Mattu Pongal is meant for celebration of cattle when the cattle are bathed, their horns polished and painted in bright colors, garlands of flowers placed around their necks and processions. Jallikattu is a traditional event held during the period attracting huge crowds in which a bull is released into a crowd of people, and multiple human participants attempt to grab the large hump on the bull's back with both arms and hang on to it while the bull attempts to escape.

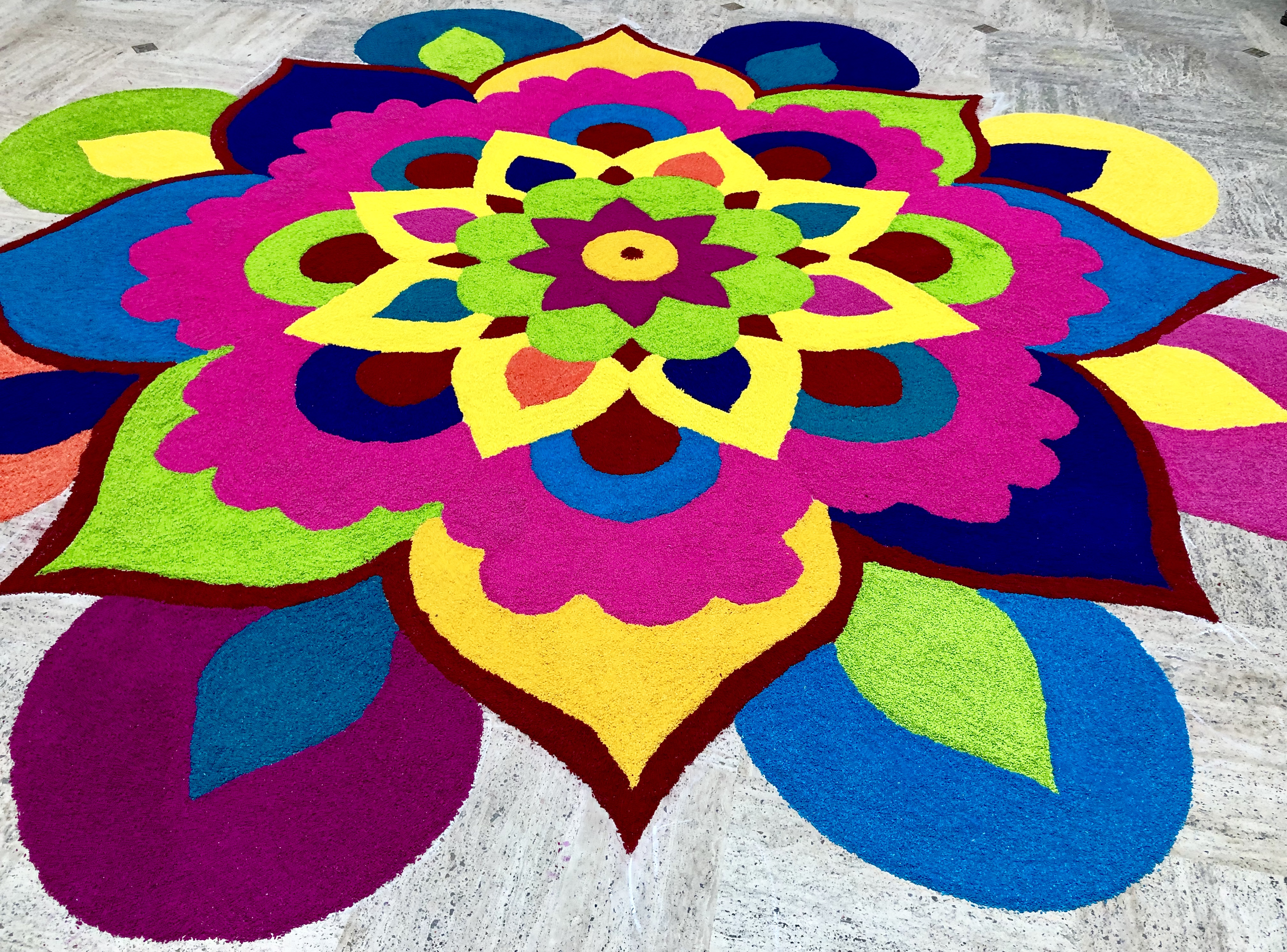
Tamils decorate their homes with colorful geometric designs called Kolam made from rice powder

Puthandu is known as Tamil New Year which marks the first day of year on the Tamil calendar and falls on in April every year on the Gregorian calendar. Karthikai Deepam is a festival of lights that is observed on the full moon day of the Kartika month, called the Kartika Pournami, falling on the months of November or December. Thaipusam is a Tamil festival celebrated on the first full moon day of the Tamil month of Thai coinciding with Pusam star and dedicated to Murugan. Aadi Perukku is a Tamil cultural festival celebrated on the 18th day of the Tamil month of Adi which pays tribute to water's life-sustaining properties. The worship of Amman and Ayyanar deities are organized during the month in temples across Tamil Nadu with much fanfare. Panguni Uthiram is marked on the purnima (full moon) of the month of Panguni and celebrates the wedding of various Hindu gods. Vaikasi Visakam is celebrated on the day the moon transits the Visaka nakshatram in Vaikasi (May–June), the second month of the Tamil Calendar and commemorates the birth of Murugan. Eid al-Fitr is the major Muslim festival celebrated by the Tamils. Other festivals celebrated include Ganesh Chaturthi, Navarathri, Deepavali and Christmas.

== Religion ==
As per the Sangam era works, the Sangam landscape was classified into five categories known as thinais, which were associated with a Hindu deity: Murugan in kurinji (hills), Thirumal in mullai (forests), Indiran in marutham (plains), Varunan in the neithal (coasts) and Kotravai in palai (desert). Thirumal is indicated as a deity during the Sangam era, who was regarded as Paramporul ("the suprement one") and is also known as Māyavan, Māmiyon, Netiyōn, and Māl in various Sangam literature. While Shiva worship existed in the Shaivite culture as a part of the Tamil pantheon, Murugan became regarded as the Tamil kadavul ("God of the Tamils"). There are a number of hill temples dedicated to Murugan foremost of which are the group of six Arupadaiveedu temples. As per the Hindu epic Ramayana (7th to 5th century BCE), Rama crossed over to Sri Lanka from the Rameswaram island via the Rama Setu on his journey to rescue his wife, Sita from the Ravana.

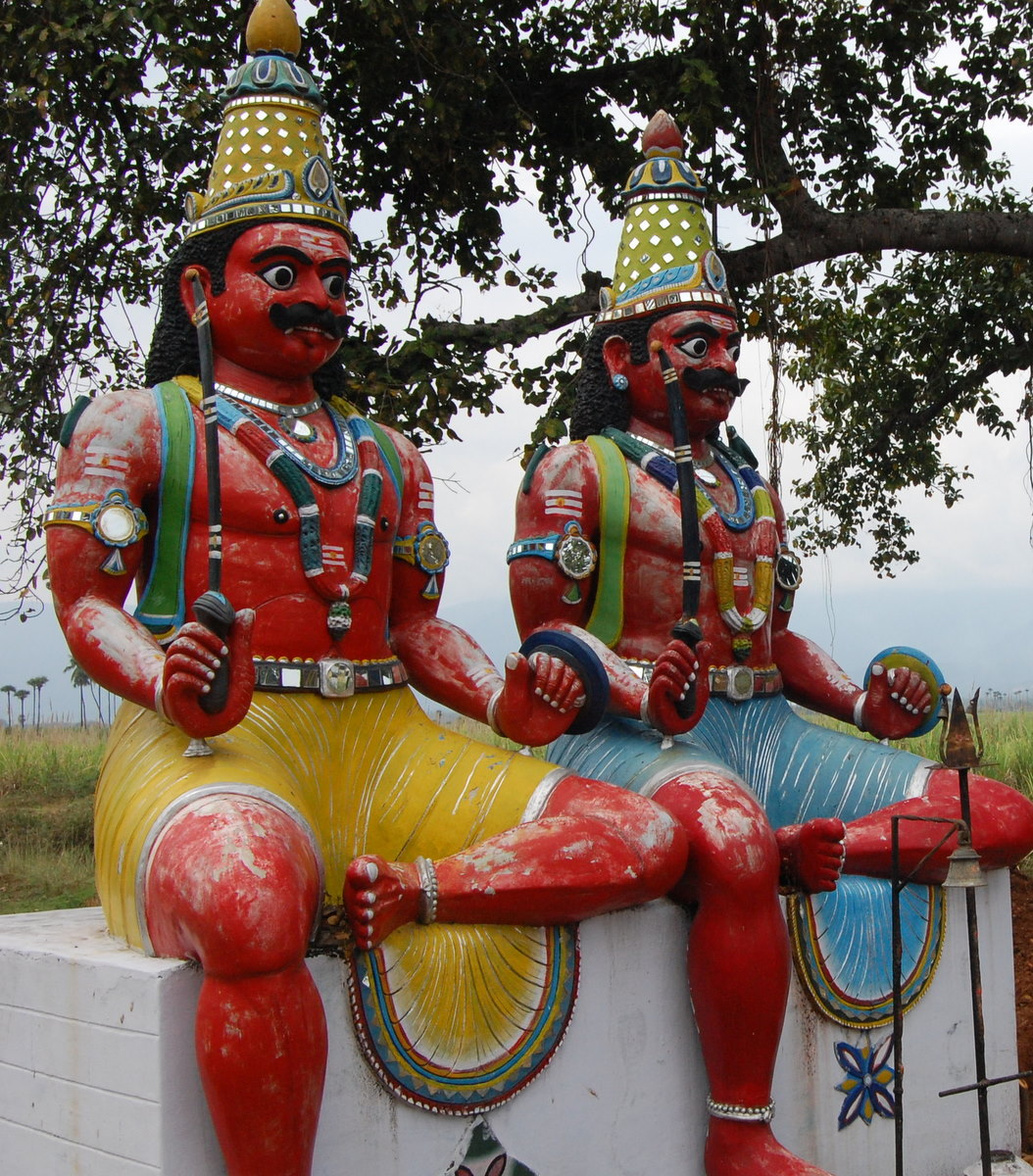
Aiyyan̲ār, guardian folk deity of Tamils

Jainism existed from the Sangam era with inscriptions and drip-ledges from 1st century BCE to 6th century CE and temple monuments likely built by Digambara Jains in the 9th century CE found in Chitharal and several Tamil-Brahmi inscriptions, stone beds and sculptures from more than 2,200 years ago found in Samanar hills. The Kalabhra dynasty, who were patrons of Jainism, ruled over the ancient Tamil country in the 3rd–7th century CE. Old Jain temples include Kanchi Trilokyanatha temple, Chitharal Jain Temple, and the Tirumalai temple complex that houses a 16 ft (4.9 m) high sculpture of Neminatha dated from the 12th century CE. Buddhism had an influence in Tamil Nadu before the later Middle Ages with ancient texts referring to a Vihāra in Nākappaṭṭinam from the time of Ashoka in 3rd century BCE and Buddhist relics from 4th century CE found in Kaveripattinam. The Chudamani Vihara in Nagapattinam was later re-built by the Srivijaya king Maravijayottunggavarman under the patronage of Raja Raja Chola I in early 11th century CE. Around the 7th century CE, the Pandyas and Pallavas, who patronized Buddhism and Jainism, became patrons of Hinduism following the revival of Saivism and Vaishnavism during the Bhakti movement led by Alwars and Nayanmars. The Bhakti movement gave rise to the 108 Divya Desams dedicated to Vishnu and his consort Lakshmi, that are mentioned in the works of the Alvars, and the various Shaivite temples dedicated to Shiva including the 276 Paadal Petra Sthalams that are revered in the verses of Nayanars in the 6th-9th century CE and Pancha Bhuta Sthalams each representing a manifestation of the five prime elements of nature.

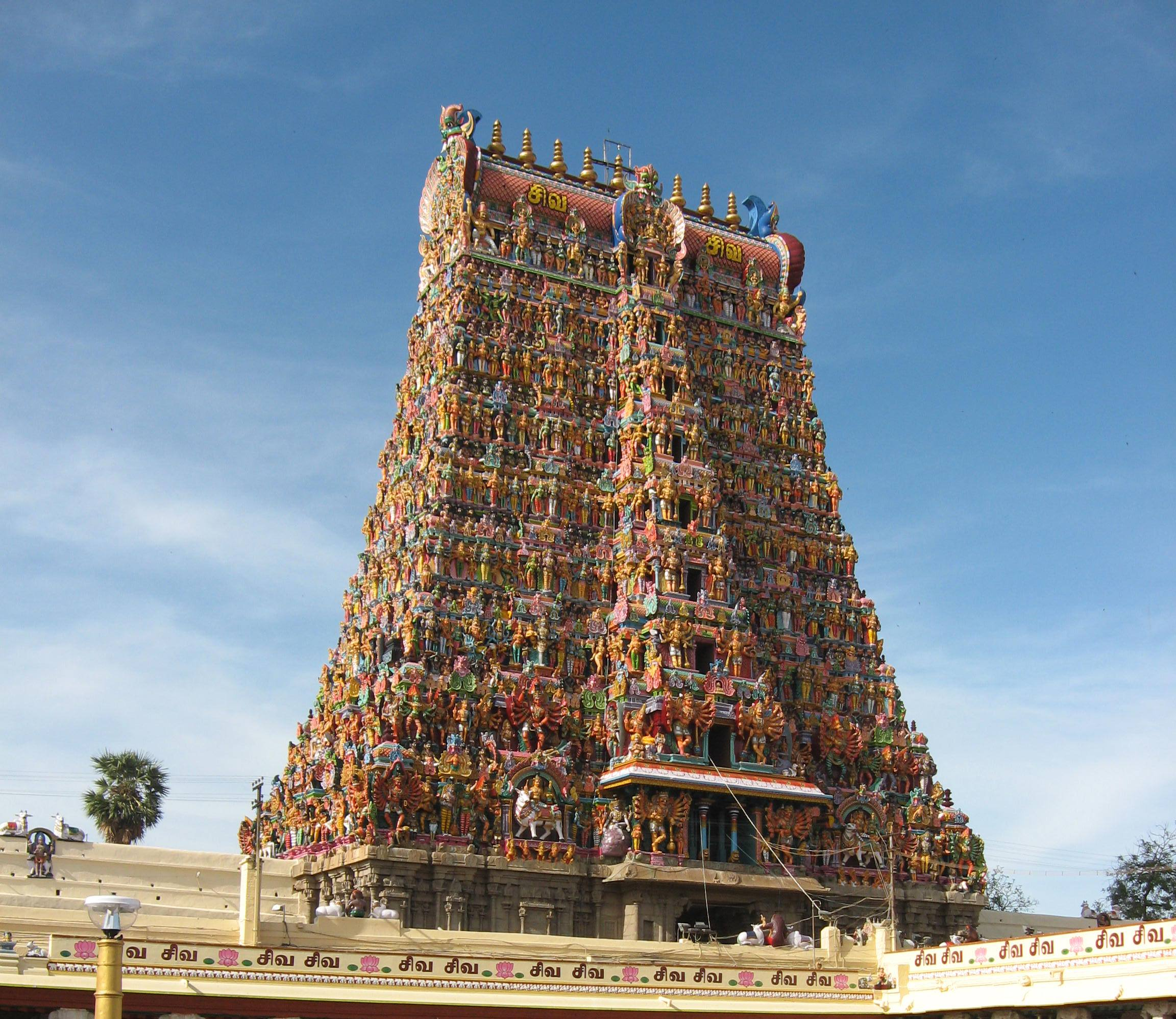
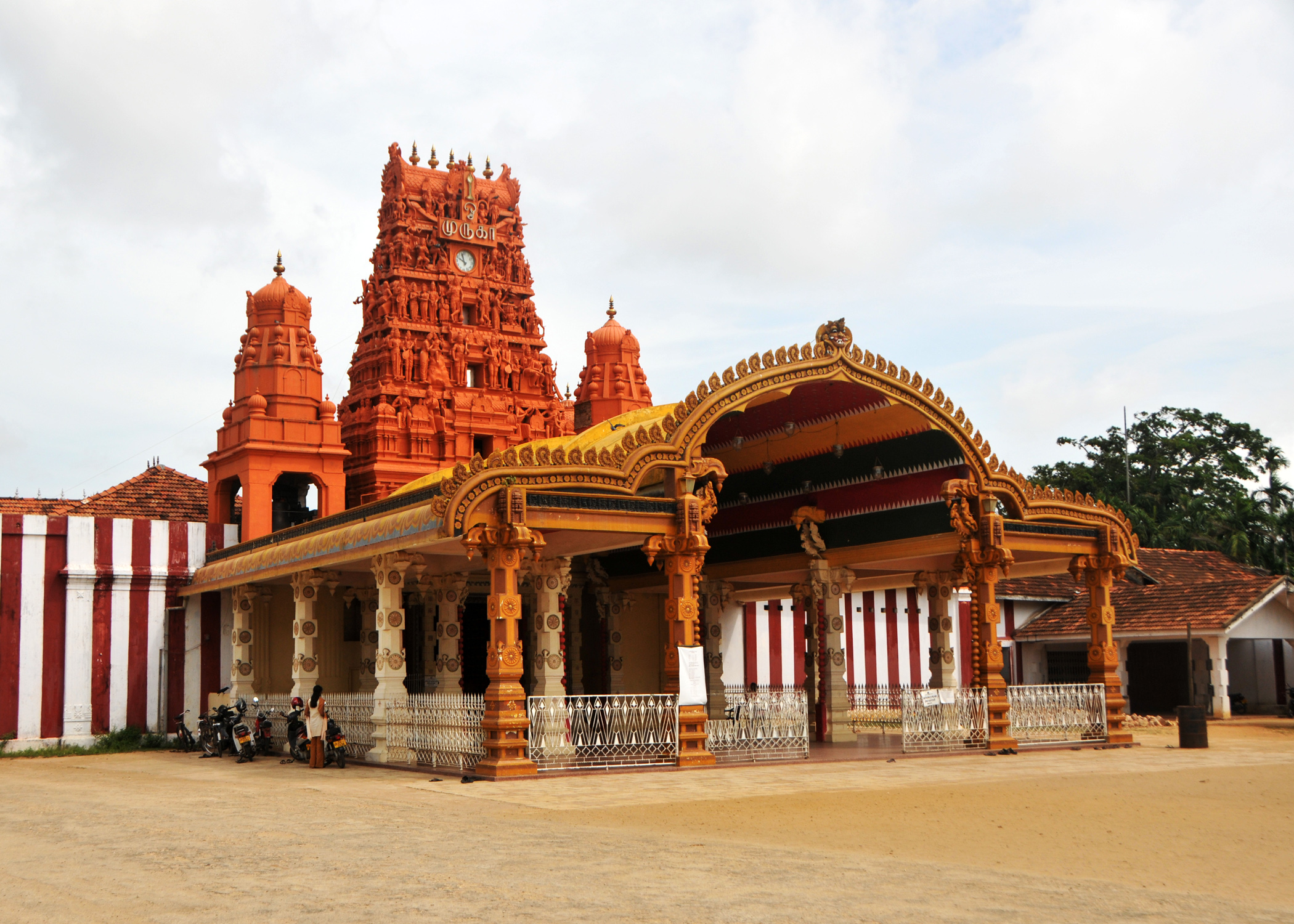
Meenakshi Temple at Madurai (left) and Nallur Kandaswamy temple in Sri Lanka

In Tamil tradition, Murugan is the youngest son of Shiva and Parvati and Pillayar is regarded as the eldest son, who is venerated as the Mudanmudar kadavul ("foremost god"). The worship of Amman, also called Mariamman, is thought to have been derived from an ancient mother goddess, and is also very common. In rural areas, local deities, called Aiyyan̲ār (also known as Karuppan, Karrupasami), are worshipped who are thought to protect the villages from harm. Idol worship forms a part of the Tamil Hindu culture similar to the Hindu traditions. Large idols are common with Namakkal Anjaneyar Temple hosts a 18 ft (5.5 m) tall Hanuman statue and temples like the Eachanari Vinayagar temple in Coimbatore, Karpaka Vinayakar temple in Pillayarapatti, and Uchippillaiyar temple in Tiruchirappalli accommodating large Ganesha statues.

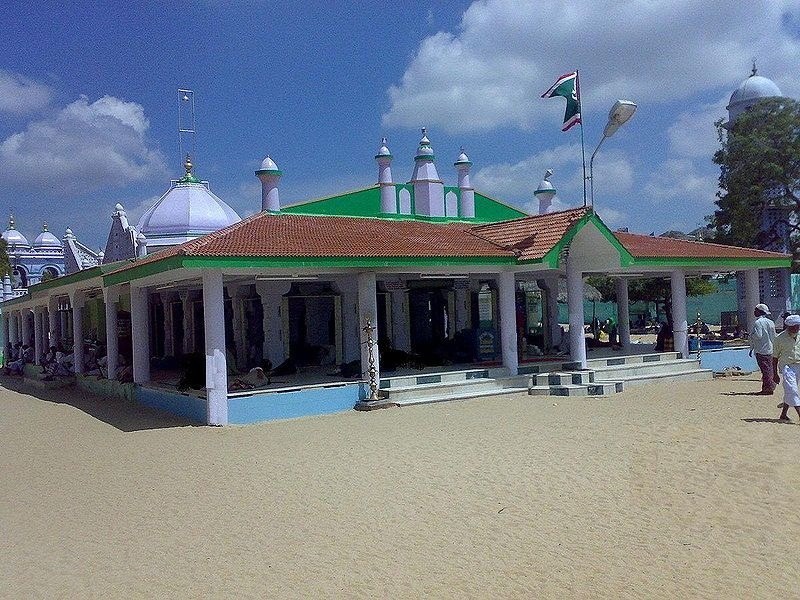
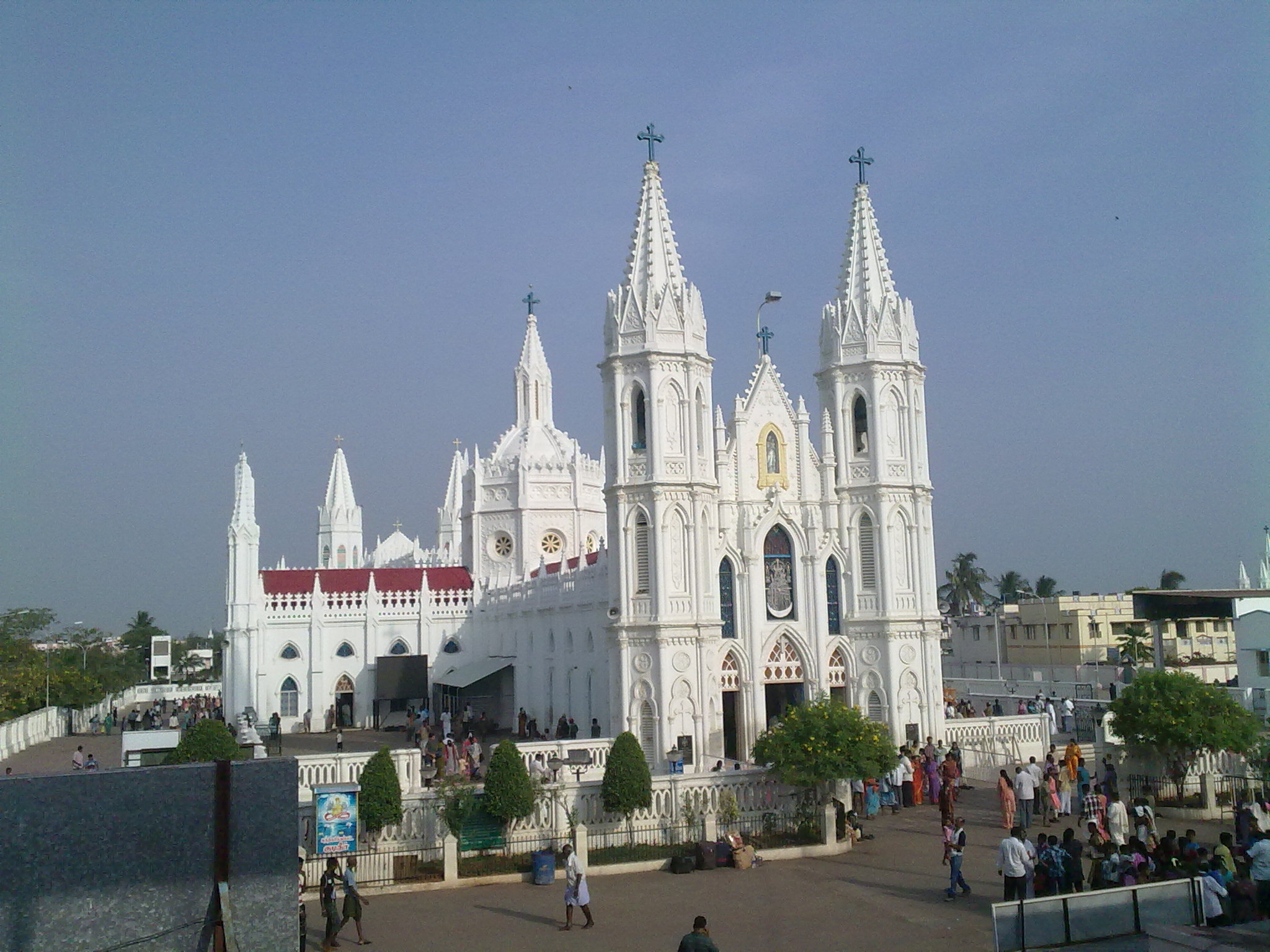
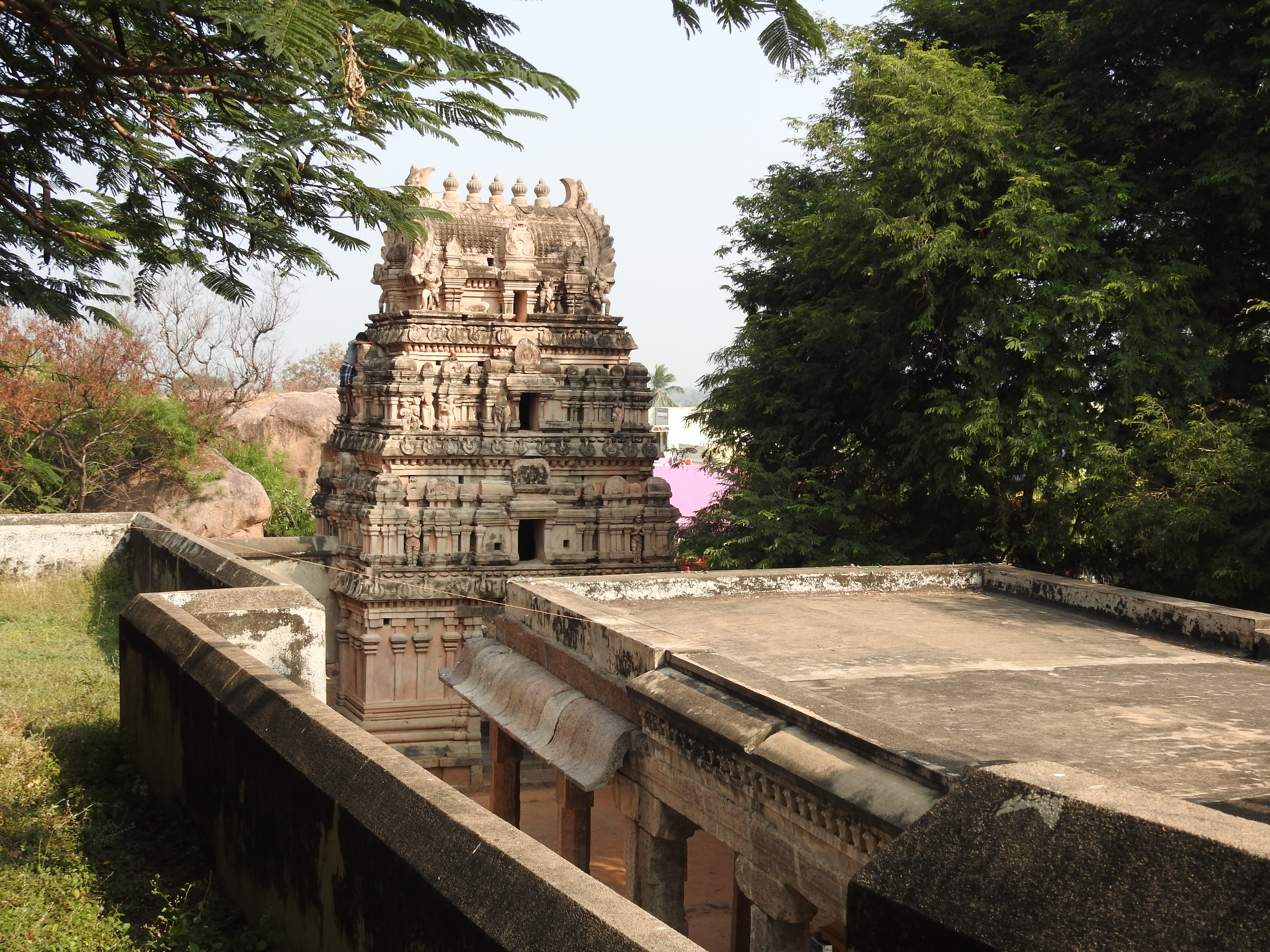
Erwadi Dargah (left), Velankanni basilica (center) and Tirumalai Mahavira temple

The Christian apostle, St. Thomas, is believed to have preached Christianity in the area around Chennai between 52 and 70 CE and the Santhome Church, which was originally built by the Portuguese in 1523, is believed to house the remains of St. Thomas, was rebuilt in 1893 in neo-Gothic style. The 16th century CE Basilica of Our Lady of Good Health at Velankanni, known as the 'Lourdes of the East', was declared as a holy city by the pope and is the primary place of worship of Tamil Christians. Islam was introduced due to the influence of the Arab merchants and the Muslim rulers from the north in the middle ages. The majority of Tamil Muslims speak Tamil rather than Urdu as their mother tongue as they were converts from the native population. Erwadi in Ramanathapuram district, which houses an 840-year-old mosque and Nagore Dargah are important places of worship for Tamil Muslims.

As of the 21st century, majority of the Tamils are adherents of Hinduism. The migration of Tamils to other countries resulted in new Hindu temples being constructed in places with significant population of Tamil people and people of Tamil origin, and countries with significant Indian migrants. Sri Lankan Tamils predominantly worship Murugan with numerous temples existing throughout the island including Kataragama temple, Nallur Kandaswamy temple and Maviddapuram Kandaswamy Temple. Amongst the other notable temples is the Sri Subramanyar Temple at Batu Caves temple complex in Malaysia, which has one of the largest Murugan statues in the world. Atheist, rationalist, and humanist philosophies are also adhered by sizeable minorities, as a result of Tamil cultural revivalism in the 20th century, and its antipathy to what it saw as Brahminical Hinduism.
