= List of Indian classical music festivals =

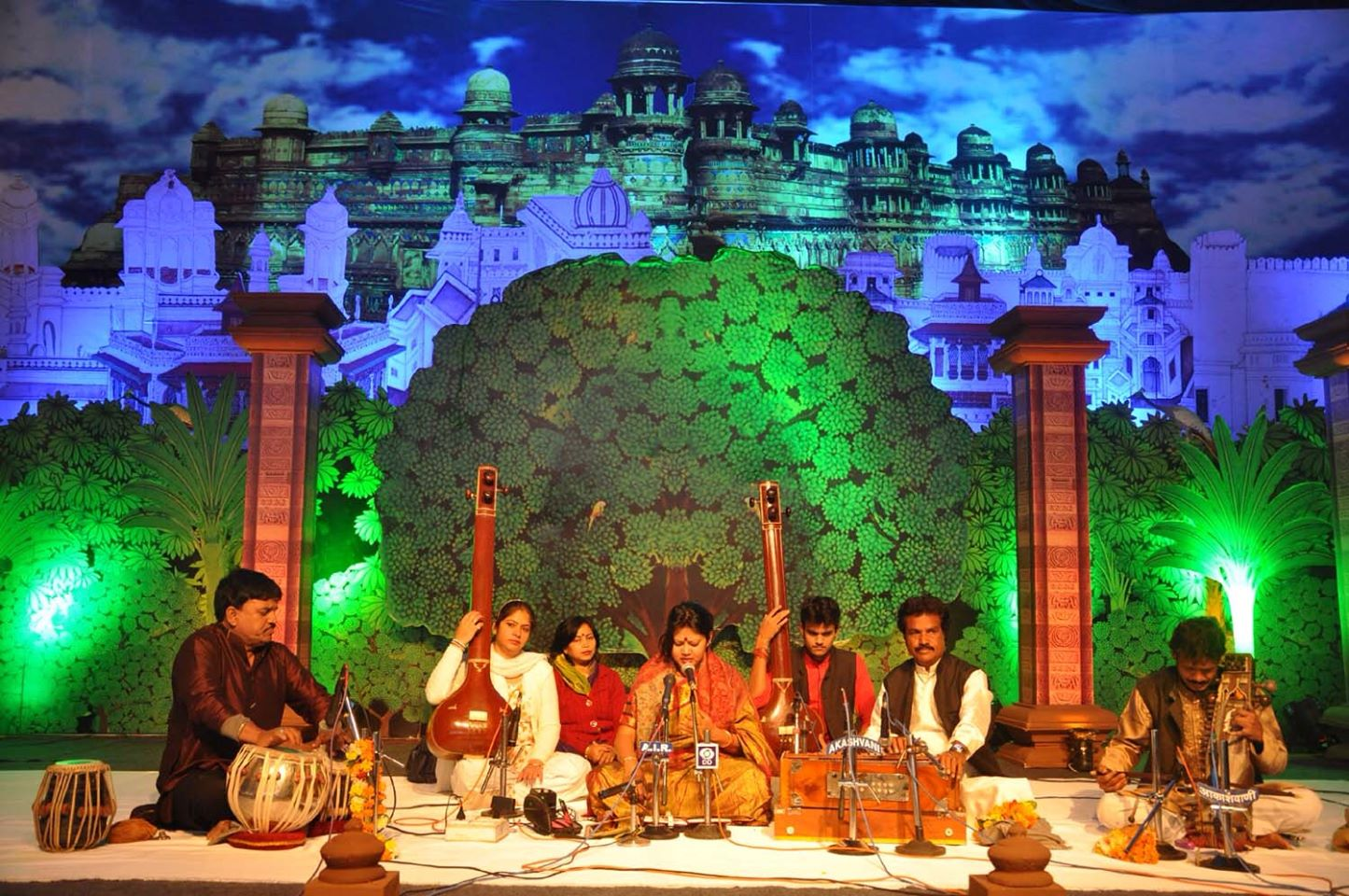

General Information
- Related genres: Indian classical music, Hindustani classical music, Carnatic music, khyal, world music
- Location: India
- Related events: Classical music festivals, folk festivals

The following is an incomplete list of Indian classical music festivals, which encapsulates music festivals focused on Indian classical music. The origins of Indian classical music can be found in the Vedas, which are the oldest scriptures in the Hindu tradition dating back to 1500 BC. Indian classical music has also been significantly influenced by, or syncretised with, Indian folk music. There are two divisions in Indian classical music. Hindustani music is mainly found in North India. Carnatic music, from South India, tends to be more rhythmically intensive and structured than Hindustani music. While some festivals such as the Carnatic event Tyagaraja Aradhana (founded in the 1840s) continue to focus on traditional Carnatic classical music, an emergent trend of the past few decades has been that of fusion music, where genres such as khyal and western music are intermixed to appeal to a wider audience.

== Festivals ==
=== Carnatic ===
Festival name	1st yr	Country	State	City	Notes
Tyagaraja Aradhana	1846	India	Tamil Nadu	Thiruvaiyaru	
Chembai Sangeetholsavam	1910	India	Kerala	Guruvayur	
Sankat Mochan Sangeet Samaroh	1920	India	Uttar Pradesh	Varanasi	
Madras Music Season	1927	India	Tamil Nadu	Chennai	
Kalasagaram Annual Cultural Festival	1967	India	Andhra Pradesh	Secunderabad	
Ramanavami Global Music Festival by Sree Ramaseva Mandali RCT	1939	India	Karnataka	Bangalore	
Purandara Dasa Aradhana	1974	India	Karnataka	Hampi	
Cleveland Thyagaraja Festival	1978	United States of America	Ohio	Cleveland	
Parampara Series – Andhri	1997	India	Telangana	Hyderabad	
Swathi Sangeethotsavam	1999	India	Kerala	Thiruvananthapuram	
Chennaiyil Thiruvaiyaru	2005	India	Tamil Nadu	Chennai	
Nadaneerajanam - SBVC TV	2009	India	Andhra Pradesh	Tirumala	
Hyderabad Tyagaraja Aradhana Music Festival	2016	India	Telangana	Hyderabad	5-Day Event

=== Hindustani ===
Festival name	1st yr	Country	State	City	Notes
Harballabh Sangeet Sammelan	1875	India	Punjab	Jalandhar	Held every year in last week of December
Festival of Tabla	2017	USA	California	LA	Globally recognized landmark for percussive arts and Indian Classical Music.
Tansen Samaroh	1950s	India	Madhya Pradesh	Gwalior	
Dover Lane Music Conference	1952	India	West Bengal	Kolkata	Held every year in January
Uttarpada Sangeet Chakra	1955	India	West Bengal	Uttarpara	
Nadaneerajanam svbc tv	2009	India	Andhra Pradesh	Tirumala	Daily One and Half Hour live
Swami Haridas Sangeet Sammelan	1952	India	Maharashtra	Mumbai	
Sawai Gandharva Bhimsen Festival	1953	India	Maharashtra	Pune	Held every year in December
Surashree Kesarbai Kerkar Sangeet Samaroha (Goa)	19??	India	Goa	Panaji (Panjim)	Held every year in November
Ninaad Sangeet Mahotsav	1965	India	Uttar Pradesh	Agra	
Sabrang Utsav	1968	India	Delhi		
ITC SRA Sangeet Sammelan	1971	India	Various	Various	
Pandit Motiram Pandit Maniram Sangeet Samaroh	1972	India	Telangana	Hyderabad	
Dumru Percussion Festival	2011	India	Maharashtra	Pune	
Saptak Festival of Music	1980	India	Gujarat	Ahmedabad	Held every year in January
Ganga Mahotsava	1985	India	Verius	Varanasi	
Pandit Chatur Lal Festival	1990	India	New Delhi	Delhi	
Virasat	1995	India	Various	Various	
Jahan-e-Khusrau	2001	India	Delhi	New Delhi	
Ruhaniyat – The All India Sufi & Mystic Music Festival	2001	India	Various	Mumbai/Various	
Sitar in Petersburg	2008	Russia	NW District	St. Petersburg	Focus on sitar
SwaraZankar Music Festival	2009	India	Maharashtra	Pune	
Citi-NCPA Aadi Anant Festival	2010	India	Maharashtra	Mumbai	
Mahindra Sanatkada Lucknow Festival	2010	India	Uttar Pradesh	Lucknow	
Riwaayat	2010	India	Telangana	Hyderabad	
Chaturprahar	2011	India	Maharashtra	Mumbai	
Sawai Gandharva Bhimsen Festival, Hyderabad	2012	India	Telangana	Hyderabad	
8 Prahar	2014	India	Maharashtra	Mumbai	Annual Event, last 10 November 2019
Qutub Festival		India	Delhi	New Delhi	
Giligundi Music Festival		India	Karnataka	Giligundi, Near Sirsi	Held in May every year
Sangeet Martand Ustad Chand Khan Music Festival	1992	India	New Delhi	Delhi	
Gunidaas Sangeet Samaroh		India	Maharashtra	Mumbai	
Karikan Parameshwari moonlight Sangeeta Festival		India	Karnataka	Honnavar	
Kolkata International Dance Festival	2017	India	West Bengal	Kolkata	
Nila Festival, Kerala Kalamandalam	1986	India	Kerala	Cheruthuruthy	
Tihai, Shatatantri Media	2019	USA	San Francisco	California	First held in 2014, 18–20 September, now held annually
Sitar Ratna Rahimat Khan Sangeetotsav	1954	India	Karnataka	Dharwad	Annual Event
Vasantotsav	1985	India	Maharashtra	Pune	
Darbar Festival	2005	UK	London	London	

=== Odissi ===
Festival name	1st yr	Country	State	City	Notes
Rajarani Music Festival	2002	India	Odisha	Bhubaneswar	Annual Event

== See also ==
- Indian classical music
