= Krishnamachari =

Krishnamachari is a given name and a surname. Notable people with the name include:

- Krishnamachari Bharatan (born 1963), Indian former first-class cricketer
- Bose Krishnamachari, internationally acclaimed Malayali painter and Artist-Curator based in Mumbai, India
- T. T. Krishnamachari (1899–1974), Indian Finance Minister from 1956 to 1958 and from 1964 to 1966
- V. T. Krishnamachari KCSI, KCIE (1881–1964), Indian civil servant and administrator
- Krishnamachari Srikkanth (born 1959), known as Kris Srikkanth, former captain of the Indian cricket team
- Krishnamachari Srinivasan (born 1966), Indian cricket umpire

== See also ==
- T. T. Krishnamachari Auditorium, auditorium situated in Mylapore, Chennai
