= Sawai Gandharva Bhimsen Festival =

Indian classical music festival

Sawai Gandharva Bhimsen Mahotsav
- Dates: Traditionally the second weekend of December
- Locations: formerly New English School Ramanbaug, 2018 - Maharashtraiya Sankul, Mukund Nagar; Pune, Maharashtra, India
- Years active: 1953 – present
- Founders: Bhimsen Joshi, Arya Sangeet Prasarak Mandal
- Website: sawaigandharvabhimsenmahotsav.com

The Sawai Gandharva Bhimsen Mahotsav (formerly known as the Sawai Gandharva Sangeet Mahotsav and simply known as Sawai) is an annual Indian Classical music festival held in Pune since 1953. The festival is hosted by the Arya Sangeet Prasarak Mandal (ASPM) and initiated by Bhimsen Joshi as a memorial music conference commemorating the life and work of Joshi's guru, Sawai Gandharva, the festival's namesake.

While Joshi was leading the organisation of the festival, performing artists received personal invitations from him to perform at it. With an emphasis on Hindustani Classical Khayal music, instrumentalists, dancers, dhrupadiyas, Bhakti musicians, Ghazal musicians, Qawwals, and Carnatic musicians frequent the concert lineup.

A younger artist's debut performance at the festival connotes their "arrival" and promise to the Classical music scene of India (most recently including Rahul Deshpande, Kaushiki Chakrabarty, and Mahesh Kale).

Since its inception, the festival has grown into a prominent cultural soiree for Pune's musical connoisseurs, featuring the foremost musicians of traditional Indian musical forms.

== History ==
The festival was started in 1953 on a small scale, to commemorate the first death anniversary of Sawai Gandharva, the acclaimed Hindustani Classical vocalist of the Kirana Gharana.

Bhimsen Joshi led the organisation of the festival from its beginning until 2002, when his health problems became of concern. Joshi's youngest son, Shrinivas Joshi, and senior disciple, Shrikant Deshpande, succeeded him as organisers. Since Joshi's death in 2011, Shrinivas Joshi has been the main organiser.

== Recent years ==
The 2009 Festival was postponed to January 2010 due to an H1N1 scare in Pune. Heavy rain on 13 December 2014 caused the festival to be postponed until 1 January 2015.

When Bhimsen Joshi died on 24 January 2011, the ASPM decided to rename the festival from its original name of 'Sawai Gandharva Mahotsav' to 'Sawai Gandharva Bhimsen Mahotsav' in his honour.

== Tradition ==
The Sawai Gandharva Music Festival is conducted every year in the first two weeks of December over three days. In the past, the festival runs through the whole night, and the days used to end in the morning. Later on, when Pune Municipal Corporation set the rule to finish the program before 10 pm which led to a change in the schedule of the program. Traditionally, each festival is inaugurated with a tribute honoring Sawai Gandharva, with a Shehnai musician performing first, in the early morning. During the first two days, programs begin in the late-afternoon and are supposed to officially end by 10 pm. On the third and final day (previously a Saturday, now usually a Sunday), the programme is conducted in two sessions, the first beginning in the early morning and continuing until the early afternoon, and the second session begins in the early evening and ends at 10 p.m.

=== Finale performances ===
Tradition was that the finale performance was presented by Bhimsen Joshi. Since his retirement, other members of the Kirana Gharana took on the role, including Sangmeshwar Gurav in 2005 and leading disciples of Joshi in 2006. The vocalist Prabha Atre has concluded every festival since 2007.

The festival officially concludes with the entire audience and remaining performers listening to the Thumri in Raag Bhairavi recording "Jamuna Ke Teer" by Sawai Gandharva, a tune made famous by and signature of his guru, Abdul Karim Khan.

== Accompanists ==
- Pt.Appasaheb Jalgaonkar (born 1922): 1952–2009
- Pt. Arawind Thatte (born 1958): 1990–present
- Pt. Purushottam Walawalkar
- Ustad Shaik Dawood (born 1916) 1953–1988
- Tulsidas Borkar (born 1934) 1989-2006
- Sudhir Nayak (born 1972) 1992-present

== See also ==
- List of Indian classical music festivals
- Sawai Gandharva Bhimsen Festival, Hyderabad
