= Purandar =

Purandar or Purandara may refer to:

- An epithet of the Hindu gods Indra, Shiva and Agni
- Purandara (philosopher), a 7th-century Cārvāka philosopher
- Purandara Dasa, a 16th-century Indian musician
  - Purandara Dasa Aradhana, festival dedicated to him
  - Purandaradasa (film), a 1937 Indian film about him
- Purandar Fort, a fort in the below taluka
- Purandar taluka, a sub-district in Pune, Maharashtra, India

== See also ==
- Treaty of Purandar (disambiguation)
