= Lakshman Sruthi =

Musical consortium in India

Lakshman Sruthi is a musical consortium founded by V. Raman and V. Lakshmanan in 2003 in Kanchipuram, India. It was preceded by a musical collaboration between the founders that led to an orchestra and the founding of a musical instrument store, a music school and an Indian classical music festival.

== Lakshman Sruthi Orchestra ==
The Lakshman Sruthi Orchestra is an orchestra founded by V. Lakshmanan in the name of Sruthi Innisai Mazhai in 1987 with 10 students; since then, it has performed thousands of times in several Indian languages and across the world. This orchestra maintains completely manual orchestration: it does not use synthesizers or any other electronic equipment.

The orchestra gained prominence with a record setting 36-hour non-stop light music performance on 17–18 December 1994 at Kamarajar Arangam in Chennai, India.

== Lakshman Sruthi Musicals ==
After the great success of the light music orchestra, Lakshman Sruthi started their own musical instrument store in Ashok Nagar, Chennai with the name Lakshman Sruthi Musicals in 2003, which was inaugurated by Kamal Haasan.

Subsequently, more branches of the store were opened and more musicians started connecting with Lakshman Sruthi thus becoming more popular day-by-day, until the junction in front of the music store was named by the public as Lakshman Sruthi Signal.

== Lakshman Sruthi Music School ==
The music school started in the year 2003 and is affiliated to Vels University. Courses offered included diploma/certificate courses in Carnatic, Hindustani, Light Music and Western music.

== Chennaiyil Thiruvaiyaru ==
In 2005, Lakshman Sruthi started promoting a platform for Indian classical music in the form of a festival with the name Chennaiyil Thiruvaiyaru, which provides a forum for established artists as well as new talent to exhibit their musical skills.

== See also ==
- List of Indian classical music festivals
