= Chaturprahar =

- Locations: NCPA, Mumbai, India
- Years active: 2011 – Present

Chaturprahar is an annual Indian classical music festival held at National Centre for Performing Arts (NCPA) in Mumbai, India. It is based on the concept of association of time (prahar) with the ragas in Hindustani classical music. 2011 saw the inception of this festival. It usually takes place in the month of September every year.

== Concept ==
The festival started in 2011 at NCPA, Mumbai. It explores various ragas associated with different times of the day. Singing these ragas at their particular times brings out the most in them. For instance, ragas like Lalat or Bhatiyar or Bibhas are early morning ragas whereas the ones which emerge from Kalyan are best when heard in the evening.

== Performances ==
Since 2011, the following artists have embraces the stage with their performances at Chaturprahar:

2011: Kaushiki Chakrabarty performed in the morning session Devaki Pandit performed in the afternoon session. She brought out the best in her while rendering ragas like Shuddha Sarang (Bade Ghulam Ali Khan Saab's bandish Tapan Lage re) and Madhmad and Badhans Sarang. Pandit Ulhas Kashalkar performed in both the morning and late afternoon/evening sessions. In the evening session, he rendered, in his soulful voice, Raga Dhanasree, Raga Multani

2012: This year saw performances from stalwarts like Gundecha Brothers, Ashwini Bhide Deshpande and Jayteerth Mevundi.

== See also ==
- List of Indian classical music festivals
