= Kalasagaram Annual Cultural Festival Of Music, Dance and Drama =

Kalasagaram Annual Cultural Festival of Music, Dance and Drama
- Dates: 2009: 28 November to 6 December
- Locations: Keyes Girls High School, Secunderabad, India
- Years active: 1967–present

Kalasagaram Annual Cultural Festival of Music, Dance and Drama is an annual Carnatic classical music festival held at Keyes High School in Secunderabad, Telangana. Kalasagaram is known for introducing young talent in Hyderabad.

== History ==
The festival was started in 1967.

== The 2009 festival ==
The festival was held between 27 and 6 December at Keyes Girls High School, Secunderabad at 6.00 p.m.

- Maitreyi Jayaseelan
- Malladi Brothers
- Lalgudi G.J.R. Krishnan and his sister Vijayalakshmi
- 3 December – Sudha Raghunathan – vocal
- 4 December – Rajesh Vaidhya (veena)
- 5 www.saaranimusic.org

== Past events ==
=== 2008 ===
The festival performances of Anantharaman (violin) T.M. Krishna, Gayathri Venkataraghavan, Rajani and Gayathri, Sikkili Gurucharan (all vocal), Shashank (flute).

== See also ==
- List of Indian classical music festivals
