= Arwind Thatte =

Arawind Thatte
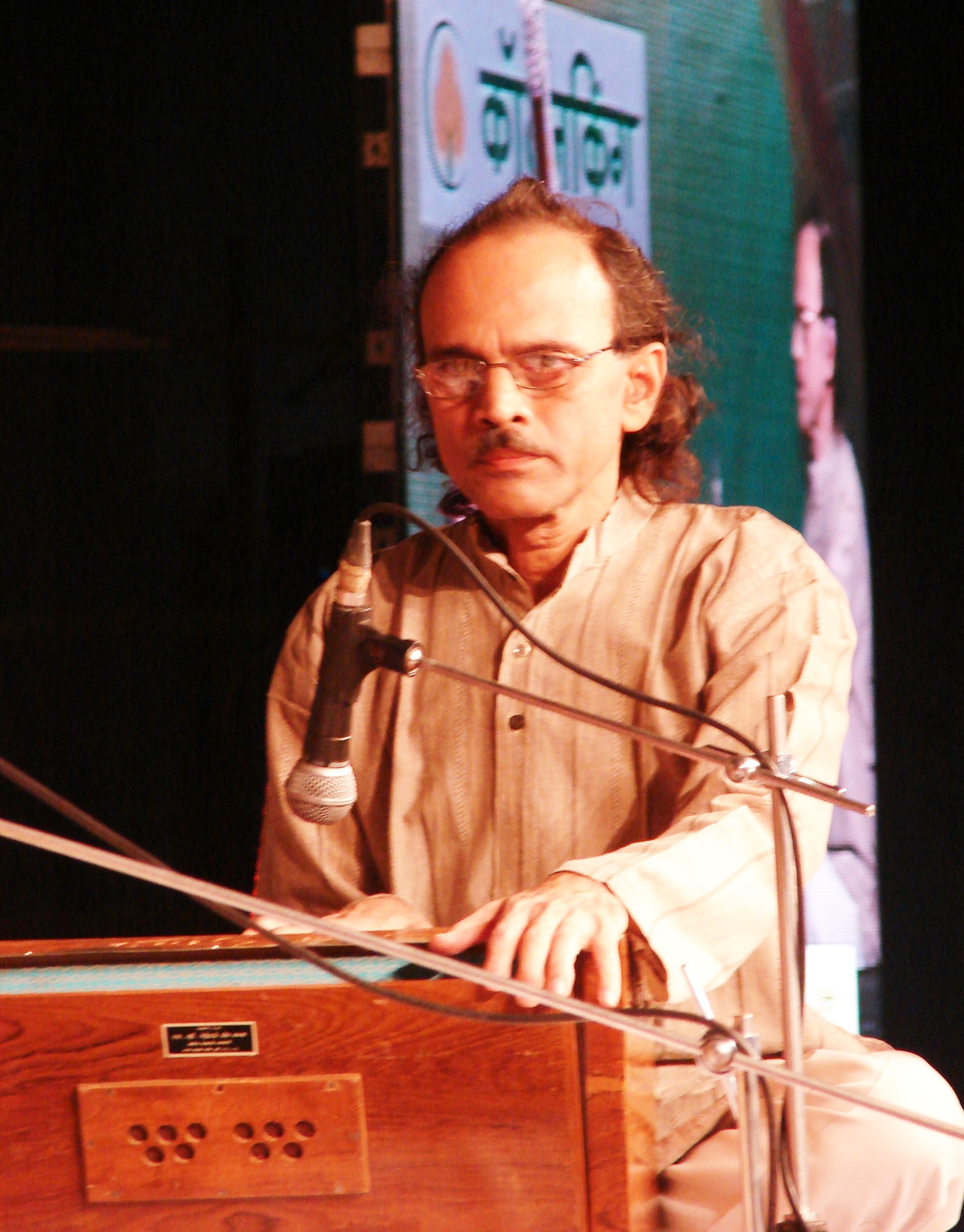
- Arawind Thatte in Sawai Gandharv Bhimsen Festival 2015

Background information
- Genres: Hindustani classical music
- Occupation: Harmonium Player
- Instrument: Harmonium

Arawind Thatte is an Indian harmonium player. He is one of the leading harmonium players of India, is a reputed accompanist and a soloist.

== Early life ==
Thatte was born in a family of music lovers, father and elder brother being harmonium players, he started playing Harmonium at the age of six. He is a self-taught harmonium player; but also learned tabla under G. L. Samant and vocal music initially at Bharat Gayan Samaj, Pune and then under Suhas Datar and Sudhir Datar, Pune and has been a disciple of Pandit Jasraj since 1981.

== Career ==
Mr. Thatte contributed a lot in various musical plays including Vasantotsav, Sawai Gandharva Bhimsen Festival. He has played harmonium in the various musical programs. He had accompanied great vocalists like Mallikarjun Mansur, Vasantrao Deshpande, K. G. Dinde, Kumar Gandharva, Bhimsen Joshi, Jasraj, C. R. Vyas, Jeetendra Abhisheki, Kishori Amonkar, Malini Rajurkar, Prabha Atre, Parveen Sultana, Laxmi Shankar, Vijay Sardeshmukh and Shobha Gurtu, to name a few.

He has accompanied over 35 artists in 70 appearances at the Sawai Gandharva Bhimsen Festival.

== Personal life ==
Thatte did his M.Sc. and Ph.D but left his career in mathematics to pursue his love of music. In 1982, he stood first in the All India Radio Harmonium solo competition and in 1993 received the first Kumar Gandharva Award sponsored by Shree Ram Pujari Foundation of Solapur, for his contribution to Indian classical music. Even though he has accompanied many prominent artists on the compact discs this is his first solo compact disc.

== Awards ==
- Vasantotsav Awards
