= Violin Vasu =

- Born: D. V. K. Vasudevan; 10 April 1979 (age 47); Vijayawada, Andhra Pradesh, India
- Origin: India
- Genre: Carnatic music
- Occupations: Violinist, Academician
- Instrument: Violin
- Years active: 2000 – present
- Website: www.violinvasu.com

Dr. D. V. K. Vasudevan (born 10 April 1979), professionally known as Violin Vasu, is an Indian classical music violinist, academician, researcher and social activist. A disciple of Padma Shri awardee Nadasudharnava Annavarapu Ramaswamy, he represents the sixth generation of the Tyagaraja Sishya Parampara (disciplic lineage). He has performed at international festivals such as Namaste France (Paris), World Wood Festival (USA), International Film Festival of India (Goa), Thai Tourism Festival (Bangkok), Sankat Mochan Festival (Varanasi), Living Heritage Festival (Chowmahalla Palace) and Telugu Cultural Festival (New Jersey) – and for bodies including the Sangeet Natak Akademi and ICCR, Ministry of Culture, Government of India. He serves as a National Jury member for the National Kala Utsav of the NCERT.

== Early life ==
Vasudevan was born in Vijayawada, Andhra Pradesh. He received initial musical training under Sri V. V. L. Narasimha Rao and advanced tutelage under Dr. Annavarapu Ramaswamy. During his college years, he participated in the National Cadet Corps, representing Andhra Pradesh in the 1998 Republic Day Parade, as well as the National Service Scheme and Bharat Scouts and Guides, receiving the Rashtrapati Award from President A. P. J. Abdul Kalam.

== Education ==
Vasu earned an M.Sc. in Information Technology from the Institute of Advanced Studies in Education (IASE), Sardarshahar, Rajasthan (2005), and an M.Music from the University of Madras (2015). He later obtained a Ph.D. in Music from the University of Mysore under Dr. Mysore Manjunath. He holds the title Sangeethalankar from the Akhil Bharatiya Gandharva Mahavidyalaya Mandal, diplomas in Carnatic violin and vocal music from P.S. Telugu University, and a TTC in Music from the A.P. Government Technical Board. He also completed Grade 8 Theory in Western Music from Trinity College London and cleared the UGC NET in Music.

== Teaching and publications ==
Vasu is a music teacher and was a cultural coordinator at the University of Hyderabad and is a visiting faculty member at IIIT-Hyderabad, where he designed a music curriculum adopted by Jawahar Bal Bhavan, a Government of Andhra Pradesh initiative. He is also a visiting faculty at IIT Hyderabad, where he currently teaches the CCA course Intro to Violin.

He received the Outstanding Artistes Research Fellowship from the Ministry of Culture and has several scholarly works to his credit, including A Study of Violin: A Case Study of Violin Usage in Carnatic Music and Interpreting Tyagaraja Pancharatna Keerthanas, a bilingual edition in English and Telugu, that complies Pancharatna kritis with word-for-word translations and with musical notations. His book Jeevana Vidya explores human values through examples from the life of Mahatma Gandhi. Vasu’s research advocating the inclusion of music in formal education has been highlighted in Indian media and noted by the International Music Council of UNESCO.

== Music career ==
Vasu trained under violinist Dr. Annavarapu Ramaswami. He co-founded the fusion duo DevanDrone with friend and flutist Dronendra Phani Kumar. They performed at the Festival of Living Heritage (2008), in which musician Dr. M. Balamuralikrishna performed a solo show, and at World Wood Day Music Festival (2017, Long Beach, CA). He represented India at Namaste France (2016).

Vasu runs Gurukulam, a vocal and violin academy for Carnatic music and has mentored over 15, 000 followers worldwide. Through Sabarmati Sangeeth, he has conducted free value-based music workshops for over 100, 000 children, including juveniles.

== Social activities ==
Vasu is the founder of the Sanskriti Foundation, an NGO promoting Indian music, tradition and heritage. Its initiative Sabarmathi Sangeeth began in 2006 in association with the Andhra Pradesh Tourism Development Corporation, spreading Mahatma Gandhi’s bhajans and moral values through music. It has reached around 25 000 children and was later televised as a 24-episode series in undivided Andhra Pradesh.

Through Sanskriti Foundation, he also organizes the annual Hyderabad Tyagaraja Aradhana Music Festival (HTAMF) , publishes TARANG (a tri-monthly cultural magazine), and hosts organic farming and educational retreat programmes.

== Awards ==
- Outstanding Artistes Research Fellowship – Ministry of Culture, Government of India.
- Samaikya Bharat Gaurav Puraskar – Madras Telugu Academy.
- International Award for Young People (Gold Standard) – Prince Philip, London.
- Rashtrapati Award – Bharat Scouts and Guides (from Dr. A. P. J. Abdul Kalam).
- Award of Professional Excellence – Indywood Film Carnival (2017).
- Young Achievers Award – Rotary Club.
- Youth Award – Government of Andhra Pradesh.
- Ugadi Puraskaram – SiliconAndhra (USA).
