= Treaty of Purandar =

Treaty of Purandar may refer to these treaties signed at the Purandar Fort in India:

- Treaty of Purandar (1665), between Jai Singh I and Shivaji
- Treaty of Purandar (1776), between the Peshwa of the Maratha Empire and the British East India Company

== See also ==
- Purandar (disambiguation)
