= Sitar in Petersburg =

Sitar in Petersburg is the annual non-commercial music festival first held in 2008 on the initiative of a group of musicians under the guidance of Aleksandr Konanchuk, a sitar player, and with the support of St.Petersburg State Roerich Family Museum-Institute, St.Petersburg State Museum of Theatre and Music, and the Consulate General of India in St.Petersburg, Russia. Since 2011 St.Petersburg State Roerich Family Museum-Institute has become the organizer of the festival. The festival is also supported by the Committee of Culture of St.Petersburg. The festival program includes concerts of Indian classical music and dances with participation of both Indian and Russian performers, exhibitions of Indian musical instruments, thematic arts exhibitions, lectures and workshops dedicated to the basics of Indian classical music and to playing the sitar. Festival events take place throughout the year at the concert halls of the organizations that provide support to the project: “More chaya” (“Sea of Tea”) Tea Club, DK Gorkogo, Youth Center of the Vasileostrovsky district, and others.

== Participants of the festival ==
- Aleksandr Konanchuk
- Sergey Gasanov
- Larisa Ragosa
- Sergey Donchenko
- Wladimir Yeliseyev
- Viktor Khan

== See also ==
- List of Indian classical music festivals
