= Raja Annamalai Chettiar Hall =

Coordinates: 13.085853°N 80.284258°E

The Raja Annamalai Chettiar Hall is an auditorium situated in Chennai, India. It is considered to be one of the city's oldest venues for Carnatic music concerts apart from the T. T. Krishnamachari Auditorium in Mylapore. The auditorium is the venue for concerts organised by the Tamil Isai Sangam.

== History ==
The Tamil Isai Sangam was founded in 1944 to promote Tamil music. From 1944 to 1953, the Sangam functioned at Gokhale Hall. In 1953, the Raja Annamalai Chettiar Hall was constructed with donations from the S Rm M family, unofficially regarded as the royal house of Chettinad. The hall was named Raja Annamalai Chettiar Hall after Sir Annamalai Chettiar.
