= Hyderabad Tyagaraja Aradhana Music Festival =

Hyderabad Tyagaraja Aaradhana Music Festival
- Dates: January–February, annually
- Locations: Shilparamam, Hyderabad, Telangana, India
- Years active: 2016–present
- Founders: Violin Vasu
- Website: sanskritifoundation.in/htamf

Hyderabad Tyagaraja Aaradhana Music Festival (HTAMF) is an annual Carnatic music festival held in Hyderabad, Telangana, India. It is organised by the Sanskriti Foundation, a not-for-profit cultural organisation founded by violinist Violin Vasu, and is modelled on the traditional Tyagaraja Aradhana celebrations at Thiruvaiyaru, Tamil Nadu.

== Overview ==
HTAMF is run by volunteers and showcases both emerging and established Carnatic musicians. The festival typically takes place in January or February, close to Pushya Bahula Panchami, and features concerts, community singing, Nagara Sankirtana, Gurusmaranam ceremonies, and the Pancharatna Brindaganam – a collective rendition of Saint Tyagaraja's Pancharatna Kritis.

== History ==
The festival was launched in 2016 by Violin Vasu for Carnatic music enthusiasts in Hyderabad who would otherwise travel to Thiruvaiyaru. The inaugural edition spanned three days, featuring Nagara Sankeerthana followed by Pancharatna Brindaganam performed in the traditional Thiruvaiyaru style.

== Programming ==
The festival runs over five days and includes an inauguration, evening concerts, student–teacher community performances, Nagara Sankirtana, Gurusmaranam, and the concluding Pancharatna Brindaganam. Several editions have also featured dance segments such as Kuchipudi and thematic tributes.

== Notable artists and dignitaries ==
Regular participants include the Hyderabad Sisters (Lalitha & Haripriya), the Priya Sisters, the Hyderabad Brothers (D. Raghavachari & D. Seshachari), Padma Shri A. Kanyakumari, Mandolin U. P. Raju, Mandolin Nagamani, and Modumudi Sudhakar. In 2025, the festival reported more than 1,000 artists performing Pancharatna Kritis in unison. The 2025 edition was attended by the Governor of Telangana, who felicitated Padma Shri Dr. Annavarapu Ramaswamy.

== Guru Sanmanam ==
Through its Guru Sanmanam initiative, HTAMF has honoured senior artistes such as Dr. Annavarapu Ramaswamy, Dr. Yella Venkateshwara Rao, Akella Mallikarjuna Sarma, V. Kamalakara Rao, the Hyderabad Sisters (Lalitha & Haripriya), Ayyagari Syamasundaram, the Hyderabad Brothers (D. Raghavachari & D. Seshachari), Padma Shri A. Kanyakumari, and Kalaratna Modumudi Sudhakar for their lifetime contributions to Carnatic music.

== Participation and media coverage ==
According to organisers, HTAMF has hosted more than 265 evening-concert artistes and 3,500 student performances, honouring 10 musicians through Guru Sanmanam. The festival also reports over one million online viewers worldwide and continues traditions such as Annaprasadam. Coverage has appeared in The Hindu, Telangana Today, Sakshi, ETV Bharat, Metro India, Hyderabad Mail, NT News, The Hans India, and HopeAD TV.

== Editions ==
Year	Days	Notable details	Approx. artist count	Source
2016	3	Inaugural edition; Pancharatna Brindaganam	~250	
2019	5	Fourth edition; evening concerts; community performances; felicitation to Mridangam Vidwan V. Kamalakara Rao	~400	
2023	5	Eighth edition; concerts and community singing	Not specified	
2024	5	Ninth edition; concluding tribute event	~500	
2025	5	Tenth edition; Governor of Telangana visit; large-scale Pancharatna Brindaganam	1,000+	

=== Scheduled 2026 edition ===
The 2026 Hyderabad Tyagaraja Aradhana Music Festival is scheduled from 19 to 25 January, featuring evening concerts through the week, student–teacher community concerts on 24 January, and the Pancharatna Brindaganam on 25 January morning.

== See also ==
- Tyagaraja
- Carnatic music
