= Narada Gana Sabha =

Music association in Chennai, India

Narada Gana Sabha is one of the foremost music associations in the city of Chennai, India. It regularly organises programmes during the Chennai Music Season.

== History ==
The Narada Gana Sabha was founded on 9 February 1958, in Mylapore. After functioning for three years from V. M. Street in Mylapore, the Sabha moved to Music Academy Hall. In 1972, the Sabha acquired land in T. T. K. Road where it constructed its own hall in February 1988.

== Activities ==
The sabha regularly conducts music, dance and drama programmes during the annual Chennai Music Season. It also conducts an annual festival of its own.
