= Parampara Series – Andhri =

Parampara Series - Andhri
- Dates: scheduled: 2009 - 13, 14, 15 November
- Locations: Hyderabad, India
- Years active: 1997 - Present
- Founders: Raja Reddy & Radha Reddy

Parampara Series – Andhri or Andhri is a national festival of music and dance held in Hyderabad, India. It is organised by renowned Kuchipudi dancers Raja Reddy and Radha Reddy. It is a 3-day, annual event is held at Ravindra Bharathi auditorium. There is another Parampara festival held in New Delhi which started in 1976.

== History ==
Bharata Muni described the characteristics of a madhyama graama janya jati or Raaga called Andhri. The dance style of this region was also mentioned by Bharatamuni in Natya Sastra. The raasa nrityam of the Andhra's was perhaps danced to the music set in the Andhra Jati (present day Kalyani), and Andhri Raaga became the ancient Andhra contribution to the Indian classical music, hence the organisers have given the title ‘ANDHRI’ to our Music and Dance Festival, and started it in 2007.

== The Festival ==
The 3-day festival has renowned artists from Hindustani and Carnatic genres performing at the festival.

=== Performing artists ===
==== 2009 festival ====
- Hindustani Flute renditions by Pandit Hariprasad Chaurasia
- Kathak performance by Dancing Duo Nirupama & Rajendra
- Carnatic Vocal by Madurai TN Seshagopalan
- Hindustani Vocal renditions by Ashwini Bhide
- Mohiniattam Dance performance by Dr. Neena Prasad
- Kuchipudi dance by Raja Reddy and Radha Reddy and their disciples Yamini Reddy with others.

==== 2008 festival ====
- Hindustani vocal by Parveen Sultana
- Sarod by Amjad Ali Khan
- Bharatanatyam by Geeta Chandran
- Kathak by Jayant Kastuar
- Carnatic Violin by Ganesh and Kumaresh

==== 2007 festival ====
- Kuchipudi by Raja Reddy & Radha Reddy
- Live Concert Vocal by HariHaran
- Odissi by Sharon Lowen
- Kuchipudi by Shovana Narayan, Aishwarya and Shalu Jindal
- Tabla player - Bickram Ghosh

== See also ==
- List of Indian classical music festivals
