= Chennaiyil Thiruvaiyaru =

Music festival in Chennai, India

- Genre: Indian classical music
- Dates: 8 days
- Locations: Kamarajar Arangam, Chennai, India
- Years active: 2005–present
- Founders: Lakshman Sruthi
- Website: www.chennaiyilthiruvaiyaru.com

Chennaiyil Thiruvaiyaru is a music festival, which has been conducted consecutively since 2005. It is an eight-day Carnatic music festival lasting from 18 to 25 December every year at Kamarajar Arangam, Teynampet, Chennai. Performances by Carnatic and Hindustani musicians, dancers, and discourses have been scheduled in this weeklong event with shows daily.

== History ==
In 2005, Lakshman Sruthi promoted a platform for Indian Classical Music festival in Chennai in the name of Chennaiyil Thiruvaiyaru this festival provides a forum for established artists as well as new talent to exhibit their musical skills.

== Festival ==
The festival is held over about eight days each year, and more than 500 artists take part. Carnatic musicians perform in tribute to the composer Tyagaraja, to audiences of thousands.

This program has been inaugurated every year by personalities like ‘Bharat Ratna’ Dr. A.P.J.Abdul Kalam, Padma Bhushan Kamal Haasan. Elaborate arrangements have been made to accommodate some 500+ artists to take part and render the eternal Pancharatna Kriti in unison. For this particular program, the stage arrangement will be a replica of the Thyagaraja Aradhana Mandapam at Thiruvaiyaru. Printed copies of the kritis will be distributed to members of the audience, who can join the singing.

Lakshman Sruthi - The musical consortium in Chennai, is conducting this event.

== Food festival ==
A food festival is also being organized, along with the musical fest, within the same premises. The food fest comprises innovative, concept-oriented food stalls, exotic cuisine, competitions, vegetable carving, ice carving, organic and bio food stalls and cookery exhibits by leading chefs.

== Recognition and contributions ==
- Isaiyazhwar: Chennaiyil Thiruvaiyaru, since 2014 has been recognising and rewarding people who contributed to the field of Carnatic music by honouring them with the title "Isaiyazhwar" In 2014, Thiruvizha Jayashankar was the first person to receive the Isaiyazhwar award from Chennaiyil Thiruvaiyaru.
- In 2015, violin maestro Padma Shree A. Kanyakumari was honoured Isaiyazhwar title by P. Susheela along with the gold medal for her lifetime achievement and contribution to classical music.

== See also ==
- list of Indian classical music festivals
