= Madras Music Season =

Music festival in India

Madras Music Season (more recently known as the Chennai Music Season) is a music festival hosted every mid-November to January in Chennai (formerly known as Madras) in the Indian state of Tamil Nadu. Spanning some 9 weeks, it features top-flight professional and amateur musicians. The traditional role of the Music Season is to allow aficionados of Carnatic music to appreciate performances by renowned artists, and to allow promising young artists to display their talent and skill. Audiences and artists come from across India and her diaspora to enjoy the season.

== History ==
The Madras Music Season was first created in the 1927 by a group of individuals who later went on to establish the Madras Music Academy. Concerts would be held at various venues at different places every year, before the Madras Music Academy settled on its present venue at T.T.K. Road. Although the season was initially held during March/April (the Tamil month of Panguni), the timing of the season was later changed to December (the Tamil month of Maargazhi) due to more favourable weather conditions and the likelihood of attracting more tourists during this period.

The All India Music Conference was held in 1927 concurrently with the annual session of Indian National Congress in Madras. A resolution was passed at the conference to formally establish the Madras Music Academy. From 1928, the academy started organizing the Music Season every year during the month of December.

Previously it was a traditional month-long Carnatic music festival solely consisting of Carnatic music concerts, harikathas, lecture demonstrations (otherwise known as lec-dems) and award/title ceremonies. However, over the years it has also diversified into dance and drama, as well as non-Carnatic art forms, and is now of a duration of at least six weeks.

== The festival ==
The Music Season has grown over the years, and has been described as one of the world's largest cultural events. Generally, the concerts take place in the afternoons and nights, and consists of all sorts of Carnatic music compositions and improvisations. In 2004–2005, there were over 1200 performances by about 600 artists (about 700 vocal, 250 instrumental, 200 dance, 50 drama and others). During the season, most of the sabha venues host canteens & stalls, such that the listeners can have meals in between the concerts.

Several concerts are organized as part of the Chennaiyil Thiruvaiyaaru week-long music festival.

== Sabhas and halls ==
The performances are typically organised by sabhās. A Carnatic sabha is an organisation that helps conduct concerts and bestow titles and awards to artists to recognise talent. Most sabhas own a hall (or two). Some smaller sabhas rent a hall during the season. Generally, the main halls, on average, can accommodate about 300 people while the mini can take no more than 75 people. Most performances are held in such halls.

=== Prominent sabhas ===
The following prominent sabhas have regularly organised concerts during the Music Season:

- Brahma Gaana Sabha: Sivagami Pethaachi Auditorium
- Chennai Cultural Academy Trust
- Indian Fine Arts Society: Baala Mandir German Hall
- Kalaarasana: Rani Seethai Hall
- Kalaa Pradarshini: Bhaarathiya Vidyaa Bhavan Auditorium, Mylapore
- Kaartik Fine Arts
- Madras Music Academy: T. T. Krishnamachari Auditorium
- Mudra : Freedom Hall
- Mylapore Fine Arts Club
- Naadha Inbam : Raaga Sudhaa Hall
- Narada Gana Sabha: Sathguru Gnaanananda Hall
- Rasika Ranjani Sabha : Dakshinamoorthy Auditorium
- Sri Krishna Gaana Sabha: Sri Krishna Gaana Sabha
- Sri Paarthasaarathy Swaami Sabha: Vidyaa Bhaarathi
- Sri Thyaaga Brahma Gaana Sabha: Vaani Mahaal
- Tamil Isai Sangam: Raja Annaamalai Chettiar Hall
- Hamsadhwani NRI Sabha
- Perambur Sangeetha Sabha
- Singapore Indian Fine Arts Society : Tatvaloka, Teynampet
- Triplicane Music Festival; NKT Muthu Hall
- TAPAS Music and Dance Festival
- Sat Sangam Sabha - Madipaakkam
- Sastra Satsang

== Free katcheris ==
A katcheri is the modern term for a Carnatic music concert. Most of the sabhas have free concerts in the morning and afternoon slots. Only the evening slots starting from around 4 pm are ticketed in most sabhas.

All concerts at Bharathi Vidya Bhavan are free. They start the season a bit ahead but all popular artists sing here. SIFA holds concerts at Tattvaloka, Teynampet and all concerts are free. Concerts at Narada Gana sabha mini hall, Obul Reddy hall at Vani Mahal and Kamakoti hall in Krishna Gana sabha are also usually free.

The Music Season 2013 was when live streaming technology embraced Carnatic music, when Parivadini launched the first Parivadini award, and also started streaming live Carnatic music concerts for free.

== Season tickets and tickets for individual concerts ==
Season tickets are available at various denominations in all major sabhas. At the music academy, season tickets are mostly sold out on the first day, which is mostly in the first week of December. Individual concerts tickets are available only starting from morning on the day of the concert

Most of the other sabhas have advance booking for individual concerts, at the respective venues, mostly starting from first week of December. Brahma Gana sabha and the Chennaiyil Thiruvayyaru have online ticket booking facility.

== See also ==
- List of Indian classical music festivals
