= Sawai Gandharva Bhimsen Festival, Hyderabad =

- Dates: 2012: 17 to 19 February
- Locations: Chowmahalla Palace, Hyderabad, India
- Years active: 2012 – present
- Founders: Mohan Hemmadi

Sawai Gandharva Bhimsen Festival edition of the festival is also held in Hyderabad, India at the historical Chowmahalla Palace.

== History ==
It was organised for the first time in Hyderabad in February 2012. It is organised by Mohan Hemmadi and Abhijit Bhattacharjee. It was decided to make it an annual event in Hyderabad like the Pune edition, and possibly an all-night event.

== Controversy ==
The festival started on a wrong note with police denying permission and the show on the first day had to be curtailed. And the police gave a limited permission till 10 p.m., making it difficult for artists to be accommodated well in stipulated time.

== 2012 festival ==
17 February

- Shrinivas Joshi - Hindustani vocal
- Rajan and Sajan Mishra - Hindustani vocal

18 February

- Alarmel Valli (Bharatanatyam)
- Kumar Bose (Tabla)
- Ustad Shahid Parvez (Sitar)
- Pandit Ajoy Chakrabarty (vocal)

19 February

- Shobhana (Bharatanatyam)
- Pandit Shankar Ghosh (Tabla)
- Ganesh and Kumaresh (violin)
- Ronu Majumdar, Bickram Ghosh (fusion)
