= Virasat (festival) =

- Locations: Dehradun, Uttarakhand (India)
- Years active: 1995–present
- Founders: REACH (Rural Entrepreneurship for Art & Cultural Heritage)

Virasat is an Indian cultural festival that celebrates all aspects of the country's cultural heritage. It is held at Dehradun, India and recognised as the afro-asia biggest folk life and heritage festival. Organized by REACH (Rural Entrepreneurship for Art & Cultural Heritage), this week-long festival includes performances and workshops in Indian folk and classical arts, literature, crafts, theatre, cinema and yoga.

Classical music and dance maestros and master craftsmen are invited to perform at the festival with the objective of fostering interaction between students, artists and craftsmen during the first half of the academic year.

The name Virasat can be translated from Hindi as "heritage".

== History ==
=== Virasat 1995 ===
The festival was first held in Dehradun, Uttarakhand in 1995. Virasat 2008 expanded the festival into a nationwide event. It took place on 2 September 2008, with concerts and events in Delhi and 300 other localities, lasting until December.

Artists such as Pt. Birju Maharaj, Pt. Shivkumar Sharma, T.N. Seshagopalan, Alarmel Valli, Pt. Vishwa Mohan Bhatt, Shovana Narayan, Pt. Rajan and Sajan Misra, Teejan Bai also participated in the series of concerts.

=== Virasat 2017 ===
Today, the festival is held in Dehradun, and a theatre program has been added. In 2017, it was held from 28 April to 12 May.

The festival, which is celebrating its 22nd edition this year, was inaugurated by Uttarakhand governor KK Paul. The 15-day long fest which will go on till 12 May will see performances by over 500 artists from across the country including Dona Ganguly, Shujat Khan, Wadali Bandhu, Warsi Brothers, Peenaz Masani etc. The inaugural event of the festival was a folk dance from the Jaunsar Bawar region of Uttarakhand performed by the Magh Mela Sanskritik Lok Kala Manch from Chakrata. This was followed by classical singing in Khayal style by the Banaras Gharana exponents, renowned singers, Pt. Rajan Mishra and Sajan Mishra. Incidentally, the festival is a highlight of the winter months in Dehradun, but it was rescheduled following the demonetisation declaration in November.
