= Purandara Dasa Aradhana =

Annual festival in parts of India

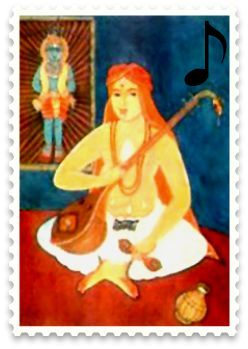
- Genre: Carnatic music
- Dates: February / March
- Locations: Hampi in Karnataka; Tirupati in Andhra Pradesh
- Years active: 1974 –present

Sri Purandaradasa Aradhana is the annual aradhana (a Sanskrit term meaning act of glorifying God or a person) of Kannada saint composer Purandara Dasa, who is considered as "The Pitamaha" (lit, "father" or the "grandfather") of Carnatic Music. The festival is observed in the states of Andhra Pradesh and Karnataka, primarily in Hampi, where Dasa lived and attained Samadhi

== History ==
The aradhana (Ceremony of Adoration) is held every year on the anniversary of the demise of the saint. This is on the Pushya Bahula Amavasya of the Indian Lunar calendar (a new moon day, generally in February–March).The Aradhana is celebrated across various parts of South India including Pandarapur, Tirumala, Hampi and Mantralayam. In Hampi it's organised by Purandara Dasara Aradhana Samithi Trust with annual programmes In Tirumala, it is organised by the Tirumala Tirupati Devasthanams (TTD) Dasa Sahitya Project annually around January – February.

== See also ==
- List of Indian classical music festivals
