= Shrinivas Joshi =

Indian singer

- Born: 1967 (age 58–59); Pune, Maharashtra
- Genres: Hindustani classical music
- Occupation: Hindustani Classical Musician - Vocalist
- Years active: 2000 - present
- Website: http://shrinivasjoshi.com/index.html

Shrinivas Joshi (born 1967) is an Indian classical vocalist. He belongs to Kirana Gharana.

== Early life ==
Shrinivas Joshi was born to legendary Hindustani vocalist, Bhimsen Joshi and Vatsalabai Joshi. He did his B.Tech. from IIT Delhi, but decided to devote his time to music.

== Career ==
Shrinivas Joshi started performing when he was 25 and gave his first solo when he was 30. He regularly performs at Sawai Gandharva Bhimsen Festival. He is the president of Arya Sangeet Prasarak Mandal.
