= T. T. Krishnamachari Auditorium =

The T. T. Krishnamachari Auditorium is an auditorium situated in Mylapore, Chennai. It was constructed with the patronage of Indian politician and industrialist, T. T. Krishnamachari in 1962 and houses concerts during the Chennai Music Season. It is considered to be one of the oldest venues in Chennai for Carnatic music concerts apart from the Raja Annamalai Chettiar Hall.
