= Tyagaraja Aradhana =

Annual music festival in India

Thyagaraja Aradhana
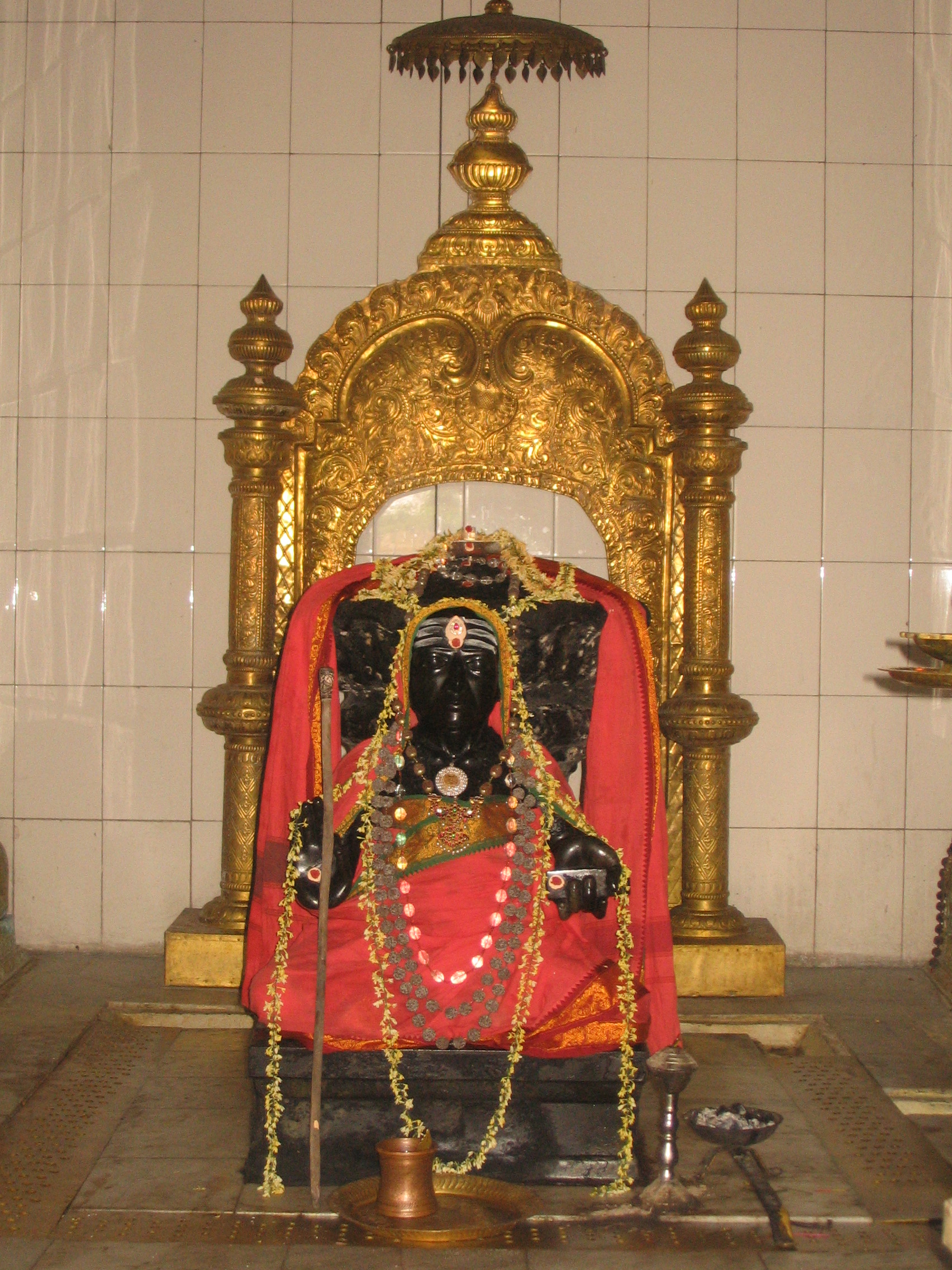
- The idol of Thyagaraja in the temple in Tiruvaiyaru
- Genre: Carnatic music
- Dates: January / February
- Locations: Thiruvaiyaru in Tamil Nadu and Tirupati and Kakarla in Andhra Pradesh
- Years active: 1846–present
- Website: https://thiruvaiyaruthyagarajaaradhana.org

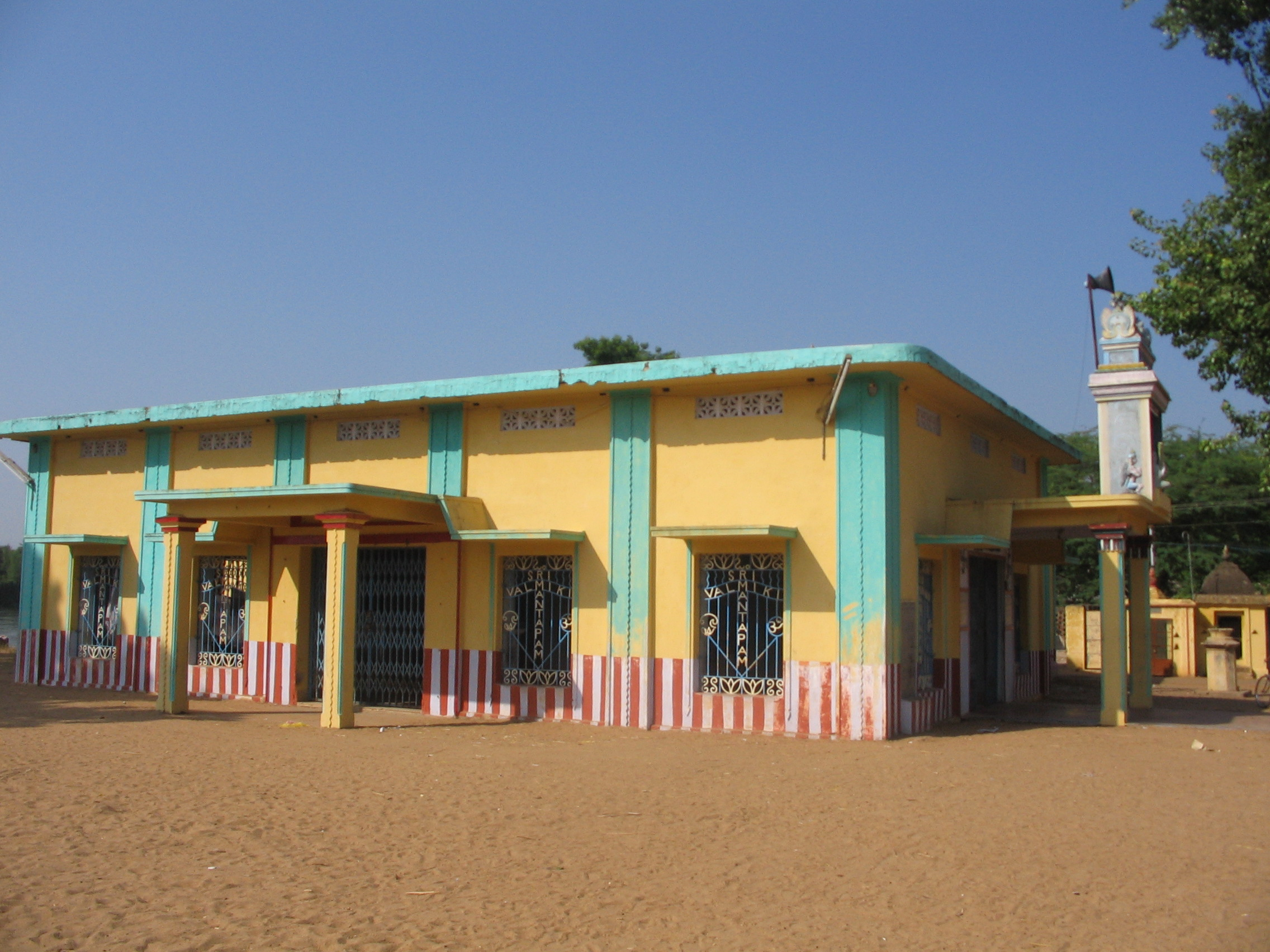
Sri Thyagaraja Swamy samadhi Temple in Tiruvaiyaru

Thyagaraja Aradhana is an annual aradhana (a Sanskrit term meaning act of glorifying God or a person) of Telugu saint composer Tyagaraja. The music festival is observed in the states of Andhra Pradesh, Karnataka and Tamil Nadu, primarily in Tiruvaiyaru in Thanjavur district of Tamil Nadu, the place where Tyagaraja attained Jeeva Samadhi. The aradhana is observed on Pushya Bahula Panchami day when the saint attained Jeeva samadhi, where the musicians render the saint's Pancharatna Kritis.

== History ==
The aradhana (Ceremony of Adoration) is held every year on the anniversary of the demise of the saint. This is on Pushya Bahula Panchami day (the fifth day of the waning moon in the Hindu lunar month of Pushya). The Aradhana is held in the precincts of the samadhi (memorial) of the saint located at Thiruvaiyaru village, Thanjavur district, Tamil Nadu, India.

== United States ==
In the United States, the Cleveland Thyagaraja Festival is held in Cleveland, Ohio every year around Easter.

== See also ==
- List of Indian classical music festivals
