= List of film songs based on ragas =

Many songs in Indian films are based on ragas of Indian classical music. This song list includes those that are primarily set to the given raga, without major deviation from the musical scale.

== Songs in Classical Ragas ==
Rāg	Song	Film	Music composer	Singer(s)	Lang
Ābhēri (Carnatic); Bhimpalasi (Hindustani)	Maname Ganamum	Savitri	Papanasam Sivan	M. S. Subbulakshmi	
Ābhēri / Bhimpalasi	"Bina Madhur Madhur Kachhu Bol"	Ram Rajya (1943 film)	Shankar Rao Vyas	Saraswati Rane	Hindi
Ābhēri / Bhimpalasi	"Duniya Se Ji Ghabra Gaya"	Laila Majnu(1953 film)	Ghulam Mohammed	Lata Mangeshkar & Talat Mahmood	Hindi
Ābhēri / Bhimpalasi	Ye Na Thi Hamri Kismat	Mirza Ghalib (film)	Ghulam Mohammed	Suraiya	Hindi
Ābhēri/ Bhimpalasi	Khilte Hain Gul Yahan	Sharmeelee	Sachin Dev Burman	Kishore Kumar & Lata Mangeshkar	Hindi
Ābhēri/ Bhimpalasi	Khoya Khoya Chand	Kala Bazar	Sachin Dev Burman	Mohammed Rafi	Hindi
Ābhēri / Bhimpalasi	Man Mor Hua Matavala	Afsar(1948 film)	S. D. Burman	Suraiya	Hindi
Ābhēri / Bhimpalasi	Tumhi Ne Mujhko Prem Sikhya	Manmohan (film)	Ashok Ghosh	Surendra (actor) & Bibbo (actress)	Hindi
Ābhēri / Bhimpalasi	Jhanakar Payala Ki Tose Binati Kare	Nag Devata(1962 film)	S. N. Tripathi	Asha Bhosle	Hindi
Ābhēri / Bhimpalasi	Jeevitame Saphalamu	Anarkali (1955 film)	P. Adinarayana Rao	Jikki	Telugu
Ābhēri/ Bhimpalasi	Singara Velane Deva Nee Leela Padeda Devaa	Konjum Salangai Muripinche Muvvalu(Telugu)	S. M. Subbaiah Naidu	S. Janaki	Tamil & Telugu
Abheri / Bhimpalasi	Poova Maramum Poothadu	Naan Petra Selvam	G. Ramanathan	T. M. Soundararajan & jikki	
Abheri / Bhimpalasi	Kannan Mananilaiyai	Deivathin Deivam	G. Ramanathan	S. Janaki	
Ābhēri/ Bhimpalasi	Vaarai Nee Vaarai	Manthiri Kumari	G. Ramanathan	Tiruchi Loganathan & Jikki	
Abheri / Bhimpalasi	Sadiseyako Gali Sadiseya Boke	Raja Makutam	Master Venu	P. Leela	Telugu
Abheri / Bhimpalasi	"Neeli Meghaalalo"	Bava Maradallu	Pendyala (composer)	S. Janaki & Ghantasala (musician) pathos	Telugu
Abheri / Bhimpalasi	Ragamayi Raave Anuragamayi Raave	Jayabheri	Pendyala (composer)	Ghantasala (musician)	Telugu
Abheri / Bhimpalasi	Naa Kanti Papalo Nilichipora	Vagdanam	Pendyala (composer)	Ghantasala (musician) & P. Susheela	Telugu
Abheri / Bhimpalasi	Chiguraakulalo Chilakamma	Donga Ramudu (1955 film)	Pendyala (composer)	Ghantasala (musician) & Jikki	Telugu
Abheri / Bhimpalasi	Padimandilo paata paadinaa	Ananda Nilayam 1971	Pendyala (composer)	Ghantasala (musician)	Telugu
Abheri / Bhimpalasi	"O Nelaraja Vennela Raja"	Bhatti Vikramarka	Pendyala (composer)	Ghantasala (musician) & P. Susheela	Telugu
Abheri / Bhimpalasi	"Kalagaa Kammani Kalagaa"	Sri Venkateswara Mahatyam	Pendyala (composer)	Ghantasala (musician) & P. Susheela	Telugu
Abheri / Bhimpalasi	"Pahihare Pari Pahihare"	Sri Venkateswara Mahatyam	Pendyala (composer)	Madhavapeddi Satyam	Telugu
Abheri / Bhimpalasi	Eri Main To Premdivani	Naubahar(1952 film)	Roshan (music director)	Lata Mangeshkar	Hindi
Ābhēri/ Bhimpalasi	Yeh Zindagi Usiki Hai	Anarkali	C. Ramchandra	Lata Mangeshkar	Hindi
Ābhēri/ Bhimpalasi	Mere Man Ka Bavara Panchhi	Amardeep (1958 film)	C. Ramchandra	Lata Mangeshkar	Hindi
Ābhēri/ Bhimpalasi	O Nirdai Pritam	Stree (1961 film)	C. Ramchandra	Lata Mangeshkar	Hindi
Ābhēri/ Bhimpalasi	Isaithamizh Nee Seidha	Thiruvilayadal	K. V. Mahadevan	T. R. Mahalingam	
Ābhēri/ Bhimpalasi	Karnatakada Ithihaasadali	Krishna Rukmini	K. V. Mahadevan	S. P. Balasubrahmanyam	Kannada
Ābhēri/ Bhimpalasi	Aaj Mere Man Sakhi Bansuri Bajaye Koi	Aan	Naushad	Lata Mangeshkar & Chorus	Hindi
Ābhēri/ Bhimpalasi	Tere Sadke Balama	Amar (1954 film)	Naushad	Lata Mangeshkar	Hindi
Ābhēri/ Bhimpalasi	Kuch Dil Ne Kaha	Anupama (1966 film)	Hemant Kumar	Lata Mangeshkar	Hindi
Abheri / Bhimpalasi	"Entha Madhuram Ee Kshanam"	Mahatmudu	T. Chalapathi Rao	P. Susheela	Telugu
Ābhēri/ Bhimpalasi	"Kalavaramaye Madilo"	Pathala Bhairavi	Ghantasala (musician)	Ghantasala (musician) & P. Leela	Telugu
Ābhēri/ Bhimpalasi	"Neevenaa Nanu Talachinadi"	Mayabazar	Ghantasala (musician)	Ghantasala (musician) & P. Leela	Telugu
Ābhēri/ Bhimpalasi	"Prema Yatralaku Brindavanamu Nandanavanamu"	Gundamma Katha	Ghantasala (musician)	Ghantasala (musician) & P. Susheela	Telugu
Ābhēri/ Bhimpalasi	"Vurake Kanniru Nimpa Kaaranam Eemamma"	Lava Kusa	Ghantasala (musician)	P. Leela & P. Susheela	Telugu
Ābhēri/ Bhimpalasi	"Challaga Choodali Poolanu Andukupovali Devi"	Pellinaati Pramanalu	Ghantasala (musician)	Ghantasala (musician)	Telugu
Ābhēri/ Bhimpalasi	"Vennelalone Vedi"	Pellinaati Pramanalu	Ghantasala (musician)	Ghantasala (musician) & P. Leela	Telugu
Ābhēri/ Bhimpalasi	"Kalam kani kalamlo koyila"	Appu Chesi Pappu Koodu	S. Rajeswara Rao	P. Susheela & P. Leela	Telugu
Ābhēri/ Bhimpalasi	"Ninna Kanipinchindi Nannu Muripinchindi"	Rani Ratnaprabha	S. Rajeswara Rao	Ghantasala (musician)	Telugu
Ābhēri/ Bhimpalasi	""Yaaramithaa Vanamaalina""	Bhakta Jayadeva	S. Rajeswara Rao	Ghantasala (musician) & P. Susheela	Telugu
Ābhēri/ Bhimpalasi	"Raavoyi Chandamama"(Telugu)/Vaarayo Vennilave	MissammaTelugu /MissiammaTamil	S. Rajeswara Rao	A. M. Rajah & P. Leela	Telugu & Tamil
Ābhēri/ Bhimpalasi	Aa Neele Gagan Tale Pya	Badshah (1954 film)	Shankar–Jaikishan	Lata Mangeshkar & Hemant Kumar	Hindi
Ābhēri/ Bhimpalasi	Masoom Chehra	Dil Tera Diwana (1962 film)	Shankar–Jaikishan	Lata Mangeshkar & Mohammed Rafi	Hindi
Abheri / Bhimpalasi	Naino Me Badra Chhaye	Mera Saaya	Madan Mohan	Lata Mangeshkar	Hindi
Abheri / Bhimpalasi	Naghma-O-Sher Ki Saughaat	Gazal (1964 film)	Madan Mohan	Lata Mangeshkar	Hindi
Ābhēri/ Bhimpalasi	"Uyyala Jampalala vuuga Ravaya"	Chakrapani (film)	P. Bhanumathi	P. Bhanumathi	Telugu
Ābhēri/ Bhimpalasi	"Samay O Dhire Chalo"	Rudaali	Bhupen Hazarika	Asha Bhosle	Hindi
Ābhēri/ Bhimpalasi	"Maine Chand Aur Sitaron Ki"	Chandrakanta(1956 film)	Datta Naik	Mohammed Rafi	Hindi
Ābhēri/ Bhimpalasi	Malarnthum Malaratha	Pasamalar	Viswanathan–Ramamoorthy	T. M. Soundararajan & P. Susheela	
Abheri / Bhimpalasi	Poo Maalaiyil Or Malligai	Ooty Varai Uravu	M. S. Viswanathan	T. M. Soundararajan & P. Susheela	
Abheri / Bhimpalasi	Ragangal Pathinaaru	Thillu Mullu	M. S. Viswanathan	S. P. Balasubrahmanyam	
Ābhēri/ Bhimpalasi	Gangai Karai Thottam	Vaanampadi	M. S. Viswanathan	P. Susheela	
Ābhēri/ Bhimpalasi	Pazhamudir Cholayile	Kuzhandaiyum Deivamum	M. S. Viswanathan	P. Susheela	
Ābhēri/ Bhimpalasi	Poo Maalayil	Ooty Varai Uravu	M.S.Viswanathan	T. M. Soundararajan & P.Susheela	
Ābhēri/ Bhimpalasi	Main Garibon Ka Dil	Abe-Hayat(1955 film)	Sardar Malik	Hemant Kumar	Hindi
Ābhēri/ Bhimpalasi	Karunaada Thaayi Sada Chinmayi	Naanu Nanna Hendthi	Shankar-Ganesh	S P Balasubramaniam	Kannada
Abheri / Bhimpalasi	Nannu Dochukunduvate Vennela Dorasaani	Gulebakavali Katha	Joseph Vijaya Krishna Murthy	Ghantasala (musician) & P. Susheela	Telugu
Abheri / Bhimpalasi	Pallava Naattu Rajakumarikku	Ival Oru Seethai	V. Kumar	S. P. Balasubrahmanyam	
Abheri / Bhimpalasi	Dil Ke Tukade Tukkade	Dada (1979 film)	Usha Khanna	K. J. Yesudas	Hindi
Abheri / Bhimpalasi	Butterfly	Smile (album)	Smile.dk	Smile.dk	
Abheri / Bhimpalasi	Sindhu Nadhi Karai Oram	Nallathoru Kudumbam	Ilaiyaraaja	T. M. Soundararajan & P. Susheela	
Ābhēri/ Bhimpalasi	Chinna Chiru Vayathil	Meendum Kokila	Ilaiyaraaja	K. J. Yesudas & S. P. Sailaja	
Ābhēri/ Bhimpalasi	Kuyile Kavikkule	Kavikkuyil	Ilaiyaraaja	S. Janaki	
Ābhēri/ Bhimpalasi	Megam Karukkudhu	Anandha Ragam	Ilaiyaraaja	K. J. Yesudas & S. Janaki	
Ābhēri/ Bhimpalasi	Naatham En Jeevanae	Kaadhal Oviyam	Ilaiyaraaja	S. Janaki	
Ābhēri/ Bhimpalasi	Guruvayurappa	Pudhu Pudhu Arthangal	Ilaiyaraaja	S. P. Balasubrahmanyam, K. S. Chithra	
Ābhēri/ Bhimpalasi	Poove Poochudavaa	Poove Poochooda Vaa	Ilaiyaraaja	K. S. Chithra & K. J. Yesudas	
Ābhēri/ Bhimpalasi	Rakkamma Kaiya Thattu	Thalapathi	Ilaiyaraaja	S. P. Balasubrahmanyam, Swarnalatha	
Ābhēri/ Bhimpalasi	Vasantha Kala Kolangal	Thyagam	Ilaiyaraaja	S. Janaki	
Abheri / Bhimpalasi / Shuddha Dhanyasi	Sempoove Poove	Siraichaalai	Ilaiyaraja	S. P. Balasubrahmanyam & K S Chitra	
Ābhēri/ Bhimpalasi (with more traces of Kharaharapriya)	Neela Vana Odayil	Vazhvey Maayam	Gangai Amaran	S. P. Balasubrahmanyam	
Ābhēri/ Bhimpalasi	"Hum Katha Sunate Ram Sakal Gun Dhaam ki" (Luv Kush Title Track)	Luv Kush (TV Series)	Ravindra Jain	Kavitha Krishnamurthy, Hemlatha	Hindi
Ābhēri/ Bhimpalasi	Dil Mein Tujhe Bithake	Fakira	Ravindra Jain	Lata Mangeshkar	Hindi
Ābhēri/ Bhimpalasi	Bole Mora Kangna	Bandish	Anand-Milind	Alka Yagnik & Kumar Sanu	Hindi
Abheri/Bhimpalasi	Medhuva Medhuva Oru	Annanagar Mudhal Theru	Chandrabose	S P Balasubramaniam & K S Chitra	
Ābhēri/ Bhimpalasi	Tu Cheez Badi Hai Mast Mast	Mohra	Viju Shah	Udit Narayan & Kavita Krishnamurthy	
Ābhēri/ Bhimpalasi	Eli Re Eli	Yaadein (2001 film)	Anu Malik	Hema Sardesai & Alka Yagnik & Kavita Krishnamurti	Hindi
Abheri / Bhimpalasi	Poothirukkum Vanamae	Pudhayal	Vidyasagar (composer)	K. S. Chithra & Hariharan (singer)	
Ābhēri/ Bhimpalasi	Tu mile Dil khile	Criminal	M.M.Keeravani (a) Maragathamani (a) M.M. Kreem	Kumar Sanu, Alka Yagnik	
Ābhēri/ Bhimpalasi	Kadhalikkum Pennin	Kaadhalan	A R Rahman	S P Balasubramaniam, Udit Narayan & Pallavi	
Ābhēri/ Bhimpalasi	E Ajnabi	Dil Se..	A. R. Rahman	Udit Narayan	
Ābhēri/ Bhimpalasi	Guzarish (loosely based)	Ghajini	A. R. Rahman	Javed Ali	
Ābhēri/ Bhimpalasi	Jiya Re	Jab Tak Hain Jaan	A. R. Rahman	Neeti Mohan	
Ābhēri/ Bhimpalasi	Kabhi Kabhi Aditi (loosely baed)	Jaane Tu... Ya Jaane Na	A. R. Rahman	Rashid Ali	
Ābhēri/ Bhimpalasi	Manmohini (bandish)	Yuvvraaj	A. R. Rahman	Vijay Prakash	
Ābhēri/ Bhimpalasi	Saathiya (tune)	Saathiya	A. R. Rahman		
Ābhēri/ Bhimpalasi	Shabba Shabba	Daud (film)	A. R. Rahman	Sonu Nigam & Swarnalatha	
Ābhēri / Bhimpalasi / Shuddha Dhanyasi	Kannodu Kanbathellam	Jeans	A. R. Rahman	Nithyasree Mahadevan	
Ābhēri / Bhimpalasi	Radha kaise na jale	Lagaan	A. R. Rahman	Udit Narayan & Asha Bhosle	
Ābhēri/ Bhimpalasi	Jiya	Gunday	Sohail Sen	Arijit Singh	
Ābhēri/ Bhimpalasi (with more traces of Kharaharapriya)	Unakkul Naane	Pachaikili Muthucharam	Harris Jayaraj	Bombay Jayashri	
Abheri/Bhimpalasi	Tanha Dil Tanha Safar	Tanha Dil (Album)	Ram Sampath	Shaan	
Abheri / Bhimpalasi	Kanaa Kaangiren Kannalane	Ananda Thandavam	G V Prakash Kumar	Shubha Mudgal, Nithyasree Mahadevan and G V Prakash Kumar	
Abheri/Bhimpalasi (with a few traces of Darbari Kanada)	Ishq Jalakar - Kaarvan	Dhurandhar	Shashwat Sachdev, Roshan Lal Nagrath (from original)	Shashwat Sachdev, Shahzad Ali, Subhadeep Das Chowdhury, Armaan Khan	
Ābhēri/ Bhimpalasi	Rasputin (English song)	Nightflight to Venus (Album)	Boney M	Boney M	
Abhogi / Abhogi Kanada	Na Jaiyo Re Sautan Ghar Sainya	Kaagaz Ki Nao	Sapan-Jagmohan	Asha Bhosle	Hindi
Abhogi / Abhogi Kanada	Aalapinchana Eevela	Sri Rama Pattabhishekam	Pendyala (composer)	P. Susheela	Telugu
Abhogi / Abhogi Kanada	Annaiyin Arule Vaa Vaa	Aadi Perukku	A. M. Rajah	Sirkazhi Govindarajan	
Abhogi / Abhogi Kanada	Boom Boom Robo Da...	Enthiran	A. R. Rahman		
Abhogi / Abhogi Kanada	Indraikku Eninda Aanandame	Vaidehi Kathirunthal	Ilaiyaraaja	Vani Jairam & P. Jayachandran	
Abhogi / Abhogi Kanada	Kalai Nera Punguyil	Amman Kovil Kizhakale	Ilaiyaraaja	S. P. Balasubrahmanyam & S. Janaki	Tamil
Abhogi / Abhogi Kanada	Kangalin Vaarthaigal Puriyaatho	Kalathur Kannamma	R. Sudarsanam	A. M. Rajah & P. Susheela	
Abhogi / Abhogi Kanada	Konja Neram	Chandramukhi	Vidyasagar (composer)	Asha Bhosle & Madhu Balakrishnan	Tamil
Abhogi / Abhogi Kanada	Naanandri Yaar Varuvaar	Maalaiyitta Mangai	Viswanathan–Ramamoorthy	T. R. Mahalingam (actor) & A. P. Komala	
Abhogi / Abhogi Kanada	Thangaratham Vandadu	Kalai Kovil	Viswanathan–Ramamoorthy	M. Balamuralikrishna & P. Susheela	
Abhogi / Abhogi Kanada	Vanakkam Palamurai	Avan Oru Sarithiram	M. S. Viswanathan	T. M. Soundararajan & P. Susheela	
Abhogi / Abhogi Kanada	Indraiku Yen Indha	Vaidehi Kathirunthal	Ilaiyaraaja	P. Jayachandran & Vani Jairam	Tamil
Abhogi / Abhogi Kanada	Kalai Nera Poonguil	Amman Kovil Kizhakale	Ilaiyaraaja	S. P. Balasubrahmanyam & S. Janaki	Tamil
Abhogi / Abhogi Kanada	Naanandri Yaar Varuvaar	Malayitta Mangai	Viswanathan–Ramamoorthy	T. R. Mahalingam & A. P. Komala	
Abhogi / Abhogi Kanada	Thanga Radham Vandadhu	Kalai Koyil	Viswanathan–Ramamoorthy	M. Balamuralikrishna & P. Susheela	
Abhogi / Abhogi Kanada	Vanakkam Pala Murai	Avan Oru Sarithiram	M. S. Viswanathan	T. M. Soundararajan & P. Susheela	
Adana (with a tint of raag darbari in the beginning)	Veera Raja Veera	Ponniyin Selvan: II	A. R. Rahman	Shankar Mahadevan & Harini & K. S. Chithra	
Adana	Manmohan Man Mein Ho Tumhi	Kaise Kahoon	S. D. Burman	Mohammad Rafi & Suman Kalyanpur & S. D. Batish	Hindi
Adana	Jhanak Jhanak Paayal Baaje	Jhanak Jhanak Payal Baaje	Vasant Desai	Amir Khan (singer) & Chorus	Hindi
Adana	Ai Dil Mujhe Aisi Jagah Le Chal	Arzoo (1950 film)	Anil Biswas (composer)	Talat Mahmood	Hindi
Adana	Radhike Tune Bansari Churai	Beti Bete	Shankar–Jaikishan	Mohammad Rafi	Hindi
Adana	Aap Ki Nazaron Ne Samjha	Anpadh	Madan Mohan (composer)	Lata Mangeshkar	Hindi
Ahir Bhairav	Man Anand Anand Chhayo	Vijeta	Ajit Varman	Asha Bhosle & Satyasheel Deshpande	
Ahir Bhairav	Meri Beena Tum Bin Roye	Dekh Kabira Roya	Madan Mohan	Lata Mangeshkar	
Ahir Bhairav	Poochho Na Kaise Maine Rain Bitai	Meri Surat Teri Ankhen	S. D. Burman	Manna Dey & S. D. Batish	
Ahir Bhairav	Albela Sajan	Hum Dil De Chuke Sanam	Sanjay Leela Bhansali	Ismail Darbar	
Ahir Bhairav	Ni main samajh gayi	Taal	A. R. Rahman	Sukhvinder Singh & Richa Sharma	
Ahir Bhairav	Oh Nanba	Lingaa	A. R. Rahman	S.P. Balasubrahmanyam	Tamil
Ahir Bhairav	Vintage Recipe	The Hundred-Foot Journey	A. R. Rahman		
Ahir Bhairav	Aur Ho	Rockstar	A. R. Rahman		
Ahir Bhairav / Chakravagam	Vidukadaiyaa	Muthu	A. R. Rahman	Hariharan (singer)	Tamil
Ahiri	Pazham Thamizh (Malayalam)	Manichithrathazhu	M. G. Radhakrishnan	K. J. Yesudas	
Amritavarshini (C) / Amritvarshini (H)	Aanatineeyara	Swathi Kiranam	K. V. Mahadevan	Vani Jayaram	Telugu
Amritavarshini (C) / Amritvarshini (H)	Natanam Aadene	Subhodayam	K. V. Mahadevan	P. Susheela & S. P. Balasubrahmanyam	Telugu
Amritavarshini (C) / Amritvarshini (H)	Azhagiya Megangal	Ganga Gowri	M. S. Viswanathan	S. Janaki	
Amritavarshini (C) / Amritvarshini (H)	Chaitramu Kusumanjali	Ananda Bhairavi (film)	Ramesh Naidu	S. P. Balasubrahmanyam	Kannada & Telugu
Amritavarshini (C) / Amritvarshini (H)	Sthirata nahi nahire maanasaa	Dharma Nirnayam(1976 film)	M.Janardhan	M. Balamuralikrishna	Telugu
Amritavarshini (C) / Amritvarshini (H)	Kaathiruntha Malli Malli	Mallu Vetti Minor	Ilaiyaraaja	P. Susheela	Tamil
Amritavarshini (C) / Amritvarshini (H)	Mazhaikku Oru Devaney	Sri Raghavendra	Ilaiyaraaja	K. J. Yesudas	Tamil
Amritavarshini (C) / Amritvarshini (H)	Sivakami Ada Vandhal	Paattum Bharathamum	M. S. Viswanathan	T. M. Soundararajan & P. Susheela	Tamil
Amritavarshini (C) / Amritvarshini (H)	Thoongatha Vizhigal	Agni Natchathiram	Ilaiyaraaja	K. J. Yesudas & S. Janaki	Tamil
Amritavarshini (C) / Amritvarshini (H)	Vanin Devi Varuga	Oruvar Vaazhum Aalayam	Ilaiyaraaja	S. P. Balasubrahmanyam & S. Janaki	Tamil
Amritavarshini (C) / Amritvarshini (H)	Oru Dalam Mathram	Jaalakam	O. N. V. Kurup & M. G. Radhakrishnan	K. J. Yesudas	Tamil
Ānandabhairavi	Thaniye Thananthaniye	Rhythm	A. R. Rahman	Shankar Mahadevan	Tamil
Ānandabhairavi	Pilichina Muraliki	Ananda Bhairavi (film)	Ramesh Naidu	S. P. Balasubrahmanyam	Telugu
Ānandabhairavi	Thaniye Thananthaniye	Rhythm	A. R. Rahman	Shankar Mahadevan	Tamil
Ānandabhairavi	Mettu Podu	Duet	A. R. Rahman	S. P. Balasubrahmanyam & P. Susheela	Tamil
Ānandabhairavi	Namakame	Puli (2010 film)	A. R. Rahman	K.S Chithra & Madhushree	Telugu
Ānandabhairavi	Partha Mudhal Naale	Vettaiyaadu Vilaiyaadu	Harris Jeyaraj	Bombay Jayashree	Tamil
Ānandabhairavi	Poi Vaa Magale	Karnan	Viswanathan–Ramamoorthy	Soolamangalam Rajalakshmi	Tamil
Ānandabhairavi	Karava Maadu	Magalir Mattum	Ilaiyaraaja	S. P. Balasubrahmanyam, S. Janaki	Tamil
Ānandabhairavi	Paarthale Theriyaatha	Sri Raghavendrar	Ilaiyaraaja	Manorama (Tamil actress)	Tamil
Ānandabhairavi	Sittu Pole Muthu Pole	Iniya Uravu Poothathu	Ilaiyaraaja	K. S. Chithra, "Chorus"	Tamil
Ānandabhairavi	Thevai Indha Paavai	Andha Oru Nimidam	Ilaiyaraaja	S. P. Sailaja, S. P. Balasubrahmanyam	Tamil
Ānandabhairavi	Khamosh Raat	Thakshak	A. R. Rahman	Roop Kumar Rathod	Hindi
Ānandabhairavi	Roshan Huyi Raat	Sapnay (Dubbed version)	A. R. Rahman	Anuradha Sriram	Hindi
Ānandabhairavi	Anbendra Mazhaiyile	Minsara Kanavu	A. R. Rahman	Anuradha Sriram	Tamil
Ānandabhairavi	Konja Naal Poru Thalaiva	Aasai	Deva	Hariharan	Tamil
Ānandabhairavi	Nadhiye Nadhiye	Rhythm	A. R. Rahman	Unni Menon	Tamil
Ānandabhairavi	Manohari	Baahubali: The Beginning	M.M. Keeravani	Mohana Bhogaraju, LV Revanth (Telugu); Mohana Bhogaraju, Haricharan (Tamil)	Telugu/Tamil
Andolika	Raga Sudharasa Paanamu	Missamma	S. Rajeswara Rao	P. Leela & jikki	Telugu
Arabhi	Hey Parvathi natha	Sita Rama Kalyanam (1961 film)	Gali Penchala Narasimha Rao	Ghantasala (musician)	Telugu
Arabhi	Tapamu Phalinchina Shubhavela	Sri Krishnarjuna Yuddhamu	Pendyala (composer)	Ghantasala (musician)	Telugu
Arabhi	Sri Kamini Kamitakara	Panduranga Mahatyam	T. V. Raju	Ghantasala (musician)	Telugu
Arabhi	Brindavanamadi Andaridi Govindudu Andari vadele(Confluence of Devagandhari present)	Missamma	S. Rajeswara Rao	A. M. Rajah & P. Susheela	Telugu
Arabhi	Navakabhishekam Kazhinju	Guruvayur Kesavan	G. Devarajan	K J Yesudas	Malayalam
Asavari / Natabhairavi	Kutti Story	Master	Anirudh Ravichander	Vijay (actor)	Tamil
Asavari / Natabhairavi	Thenmozhi	Thiruchitrambalam	Anirudh Ravichander	Santhosh Narayanan	Tamil
Asavari / Natabhairavi	Kanave Kanave (Tamil)/ Kanule Kanale (Telugu) / Yun Hi Re (Hindi)	David (Tamil/Telugu); David (Hindi)	Anirudh Ravichander	Anirudh Ravichander (Tamil/Telugu); Swetha Mohan, Anirudh Ravichander (Hindi)	Tamil / Hindi
Asavari / Natabhairavi	Kannazhaga - The Kiss of Love	3	Anirudh Ravichander	Dhanush, Shruti Haasan	Tamil
Asavari / Natabhairavi	Megham Karukkatha	Thiruchitrambalam	Anirudh Ravichander	Dhanush	Tamil
Asavari / Natabhairavi	Oh Penne	Vanakkam Chennai	Anirudh Ravichander	Vishal Dadlani, Anirudh Ravichander	Tamil
Asavari / Natabhairavi	Yaanji	Vikram Vedha	Sam C. S.	Anirudh Ravichander, Shakthisree Gopalan	Tamil
Asavari / Natabhairavi	Piya Te Kaha	Toofan Aur Deeya	Vasant Desai	Lata Mangeshkar	Hindi
Asavari / Natabhairavi	Chale Jana Nahin Naina Milake	Bari Behen	Husnlal Bhagatram	Lata Mangeshkar	Hindi
Asavari / Natabhairavi	Lo Aa Gayi Unki Yaad	Do Badan	Ravi (composer)	Lata Mangeshkar	Hindi
Asavari / Natabhairavi	Mujhe Gale Se Laga Lo Bahut Udas Hun Main	Aaj Aur Kal (1963 film)	Ravi (composer)	Mohammed Rafi & Asha Bhosle	Hindi
Asavari / Natabhairavi	Madhumasa Chandrama	Vijaya Vani(1976 film)	Rajan–Nagendra	S. Janaki & Vani Jairam	Kannada
Asavari / Natabhairavi	Jadoo Teri Nazar, Khusboo Tera Badan	Darr	Shiv–Hari	Udit Narayan	Hindi
Asavari / Natabhairavi	Thenpaandi Cheemayile	Nayakan	Ilaiyaraja	Kamal Haasan	Tamil
Asavari / Natabhairavi	Chandralekha	Thiruda thiruda	A. R. Rahman	Anupama & Suresh Peters	Tamil
Asavari / Natabhairavi	Hello Mister Ethirkatchi	Iruvar	A. R. Rahman	Harini, Rajagopal	Tamil
Asavari / Natabhairavi	Kadhal Sadugudu	Alaipayuthey	A. R. Rahman	S.P. Charan	Tamil
Asavari / Natabhairavi	New York Nagaram	Sillunu Oru Kaadhal	A. R. Rahman	A. R. Rahman	Tamil
Asavari / Natabhairavi	Aadisi Nodu Belisi Nodu	Kasturi Nivasa	G. K. Venkatesh	P. B. Sreenivas	Kannada
Asavari / Natabhairavi	Hindustanavu Endu Mareyada	Amrutha Ghalige	Rajan–Nagendra	P. Jayachandran, B. R. Chaya	Kannada
Asavari / Natabhairavi	Shiva Shiva endara	Bhaktha Siriyala	T. G. Lingappa	S. P. Balasubrahmanyam	Kannada
Asavari / Natabhairavi	Arabic Kuthu	Beast	Anirudh Ravichander	Anirudh Ravichander, Jonita Gandhi	Tamil
Atana	Joharu Sikhipincha maulee	Sri Krishna Vijayamu	Pendyala (composer)	P. Susheela	Telugu
Atana	Oho bangaaru pichukaa	Bangaru Pichika	K. V. Mahadevan	S. P. Balasubrahmanyam	Telugu
Atana	Bala Kanakamaya Chela	Sagara Sangamam	Ilaiyaraaja	S. Janaki	Telugu
Bageshri	Shubh Ghadi Aai	Insaaf Ki Tope	Master Nagar Das Nayak	Shaila V. Panchotia	Hindi
Bageshri	Madhura Madhura Sangeet	Sangeet Samrat Tansen	S. N. Tripathi	Pandharinath Kolhapure & Poorna Seth	Hindi
Bageshri	Divane Tum, Divane Hum	Bezubaan (1962 film)	Chitragupt (composer)	Lata Mangeshkar	Hindi
Bageshri	Chah Barbad Karegi	Shahjehan	Naushad	Lata Mangeshkar	Hindi
Bageshri	Ja Re, Beiman Tujhe Jan Liya	Private Secretary(1962 film)	Dilip Dholakia	Manna Dey	Hindi
Bageshri	Mohabbat Hi Na Jo Samjhe Woh Jalim Pyar Kya Jane	Parchhain	C. Ramchandra	Talat Mahmood	Hindi
Bageshri	Radha Na bole Na Bole Re	Azaad (1955 film)	C. Ramchandra	Lata Mangeshkar	Hindi
Bhāgeshri (Carnatic); Bageshri (Hindustani)	Jaag Dard-E-Ishq Jaag	Anarkali	C. Ramchandra	Hemanta Kumar Mukhopadhyay & Lata Mangeshkar	Hindi
Bhāgeshri (Carnatic); Bageshri (Hindustani)	Jao Jao Nand Ke Lala	Rungoli	Shankar–Jaikishan	Lata Mangeshkar	Hindi
Bhāgeshri (Carnatic); Bageshri (Hindustani)	Kaise Kate Rajani	Kshudhita Pashan	Ali Akbar Khan		Bengali
Bhāgeshri (Carnatic); Bageshri (Hindustani)	Hamse Aya Na Gaya	Dekh Kabira Roya	Madan Mohan (composer)	Talat Mahmood	Hindi
Bhāgeshri (Carnatic); Bageshri (Hindustani)	Aja Re, Paradesi	Madhumati	Salil Chowdhury	Lata Mangeshkar	Hindi
Bhāgeshri (Carnatic); Bageshri (Hindustani)	Ghadi Ghadi Mora Dil Dhadke	Madhumati	Salil Chowdhury	Lata Mangeshkar	Hindi
Bhāgeshri (Carnatic); Bageshri (Hindustani)	Bedardi Dagabaz Ja Tu Nahin Balma Mora	Bluff Master (1963 film)	Kalyanji–Anandji	Lata Mangeshkar	Hindi
Bageshri	Andharangam Naanariven	Ganga Gowri(old)	M. S. Viswanathan	P. B. Sreenivas, P. Susheela	Tamil
Bageshri	Kaana Inbam	Sabaash Meena	T. G. Lingappa	T. A. Mothi & P. Susheela	Tamil
Bageshri	Kila Kila Nagavula Nava Mohini	Vasantha Sena (1967 film)	S. Rajeswara Rao	Ghantasala (musician)	Telugu
Bageshri	Kalaiye En Vazhkaiyil	Meenda Sorgam	T. Chalapathi Rao	A. M. Rajah & P. Susheela	
Bageshri	Koluse Koluse	Penn Buddhi Munn Buddhi	Chandrabose	S. P. Balasubrahmanyam & S. P. Sailaja	
Bageshri	Mayakkum Maalai	Gulebakavali	Viswanathan–Ramamoorthy	A. M. Rajah & Jikki	
Bageshri	Mazhai Varuthu	Raja Kaiya Vacha	Ilaiyaraaja	K. J. Yesudas & K. S. Chithra	
Bageshri	Nee Ennenna	Netru Indru Naalai	M. S. Viswanathan	T. M. Soundararajan & P. Susheela	
Bageshri	Nee Kosame Ne Jeevinchunadi	Mayabazaar	Ghantasala	Ghantasala & P. Leela	Telugu
Bageshri	"Raara Kanaraara"	Jagadeka Veeruni Katha	Pendyala (composer)	Ghantasala	Telugu
Bageshri	"Nagumomu Choopinchavaa gopala"	Amarasilpi Jakkanna	S. Rajeswara Rao	P. Susheela	Telugu
Bageshri	Nilave Ennidam	Ramu	M. S. Viswanathan	P. B. Sreenivas	Tamil
Bageshri	Aaromale	Vinnaithaandi Varuvaayaa	A. R. Rahman	Alphons Joseph	Tamil
Bageshri	Eduthu Naan Vidavaa	Pudhu Pudhu Arthangal	Ilaiyaraaja	S. P. Balasubrahmanyam, Ilaiyaraaja	Tamil
Bageshri	Ingeyum Engeyum	Sathya (1988 film)	Ilaiyaraaja	Lata Mangeshkar	Tamil
Bageshri	Kaaviyam Paadava Thendrale (Idhayathai Thirudadhe) / Aamani Paadave	Geethanjali (1989 film)	Ilaiyaraaja	Mano & S. P. Balasubrahmanyam	Tamil / Telugu
Bageshri	Melatha Mella Thattu	Aruvadai Naal	Ilaiyaraaja	Malaysia Vasudevan, S. Janaki	Tamil
Bageshri	Singalathu Chinnakuyile	Punnagai Mannan	Ilaiyaraaja	S. P. Balasubrahmanyam, K. S. Chithra	Tamil
Bageshri	Then Mozhi	Solla Thudikuthu Manasu	Ilaiyaraaja	Mano	Tamil
Bahar	Sakal Bana Gagan	Mamta (1966 film)	Roshan (music director)	Lata Mangeshkar	Hindi
Bahar	Man Ki Bin Matavari Baje	Shabaab (film)	Naushad	Lata Mangeshkar & Mohammed Rafi	Hindi
Bahar	Chham Chham Nachat Ayi Bahar	Chhaya (film)	Salil Chowdhury	Lata Mangeshkar	Hindi
Bahar	Re Re Bahar Ayi	Jai Hanumaan(1973 film)	Narayan Datta	Asha Bhosle & Mahendra Kapoor	Hindi
Basant (raga)	Basant Hai Aayaa Rangeela	Stree (1961 film)	C. Ramchandra	Asha Bhosle & Mahendra Kapoor	Hindi
Basant (raga)	Ketaki Gulab Juhi Champaka Bana Phule	Basant Bahar (film)	Shankar–Jaikishan	Bhimsen Joshi	Hindi
Basant (raga) (Blend of Shuddha Vasant, Vasant, Shivranjani)	Idhayam	Kochadaiiyaan	A. R. Rahman	Chinmayi & Srinivas (singer)	Tamil
Begada / Bihagada	Sarva Mangala Naama Seetarama Rama	Bhakta Potana	V. Nagayya	V. Nagayya & Chorus	Telugu
Begada / Bihagada	Nadireyi Gadichene	Jayasimha (1955 film)	T. V. Raju	P. Susheela	Telugu
Begada / Bihagada	Idi Mana Ashramambu Ichata Neevu Nivasimpa Vachhunu	Lava Kusa	Ghantasala (musician)	Ghantasala (musician)	Telugu
Begada / Bihagada	Nee Daya Raada Nirupama Rama	Bhakta Potana(1966 film)	S. Rajeswara Rao	P. B. Sreenivas	Telugu
Bhairav	Hanse Tim Tim	Sanskar (1952 film)	Roshan (music director)	Lata Mangeshkar	Hindi
Bhairav & Kalingada/Kalingara	Mohe Bhul Gaye Sanvariya	Baiju Bawra (film)	Naushad	Lata Mangeshkar	Hindi
Bhairav	Amma Roti De	Sansar(1952 film)	Emani Sankara Sastry	Lata Mangeshkar	Hindi
Bhairav	Jaago, Mohan Pyare Jaago	Jagte Raho	Salil Chowdhury	Lata Mangeshkar	Hindi & Bengali
Bhairav	Mana Re Hari Ke Guna	Musafir (1957 film)	Salil Chowdhury	Lata Mangeshkar	Hindi
Bhairav	Ek Ritu Aye Ek Ritu Jaye	Gautam Govinda	Laxmikant–Pyarelal	Kishore Kumar	Hindi
Bhairavi	Taal se taal mila	Taal	A. R. Rahman	Alka Yagnik, Udit Narayan	Hindi
Bhairavi	Baabul Mora, Naihar Chhooto Hi Jaaye	Street Singer	Raichand Boral	K. L. Saigal	Hindi
Bhairavi	Aie Kitab-e-Taqdeer	My Sister	Pankaj Mullick	K. L. Saigal	Hindi
Bhairavi	Kabhi Neki Bhi Uske Ji Men Gar Aa Jaye Hai Mujhse	"Ghazi Salahuddin" 1939	Khemchand Prakash	Kalyaani	Hindi
Bhairavi	Hato Kaheko Juthi Banao Batiyaan	Manzil	S. D. Burman	Manna Dey	Hindi
Bhairavi	Nache Man Mora Magan Dhig Dha Dhigi Dhigi	Meri Surat Teri Ankhen	S. D. Burman	Mohammed Rafi	Hindi
Bhairavi	Dil Aaj Shair Hai	Gambler	S. D. Burman	Kishore Kumar	Hindi
Bhairavi	Jaise Radha Ne Mala Japi Shyam	Tere Mere Sapne	S. D. Burman	Lata Mangeshkar	Hindi
Bhairavi	Sun Ri Pavan, Pavan Puravaiya	Anuraag (1972 film)	S. D. Burman	Lata Mangeshkar	Hindi
Bhairavi	Aaya Hai Mujhe Phir Yad	Devar	Roshan (music director)	Mukesh (singer)	Hindi
Bhairavi	Laga, Chunari Mein Daag	Dil Hi To Hai	Roshan (music director)	Manna Dey	Hindi
Bhairavi	Phool Gendava Na Maaro	Dooj Ka Chaand	Roshan (music director)	Manna Dey	Hindi
Bhairavi	Albeli Naar Pritam Dwar	Main Shadi Karne Chala(1962 Film)	Chitragupt (composer)	Manna Dey	Hindi
Bhairavi	O Gauri Tori Banki	Aadi Raat Ke Baad	Chitragupt (composer)	Manna Dey	Hindi
Bhairavi	Sajna, Sajna Kahe Bhul Gaye Din Pyar Ke	Chand Mere Aja	Chitragupt (composer)	Lata Mangeshkar	Hindi
Bhairavi	Sur Badale Kaise, Kaise Dekho Kismat Ki Shahana	Barkha (film)	Chitragupt (composer)	Mohammed Rafi	Hindi
Bhairavi	Tera Jadu Na Chalega	Guest House	Chitragupt (composer)	Lata Mangeshkar	Hindi
Bhairavi	Tum Hi Ho Mata, Pitaa Tumhi Ho	Main Chup Rahungi	Chitragupt (composer)	Lata Mangeshkar	Hindi
Bhairavi	Kaise Aau Jamuna Ke Tir	Devta (1956 film)	C. Ramchandra	Lata Mangeshkar	Hindi
Bhairavi	Chali Gori Pi Se Milan Ko Chali	Ek Hi Raasta (1956 film)	Hemant Kumar	Hemant Kumar	Hindi
Bhairavi	Na Bajayi Ho Shyam	Alor Pipasa	Hemant Kumar	Lata Mangeshkar	Hindi
Bhairavi	Saqiya Aaj Mujhe Nind Nahi Ayegi	Sahib Bibi Aur Ghulam	Hemant Kumar	Asha Bhosle	Hindi
Bhairavi	Aap Ki Yaad Aati Rahi, Raat Bhar	Gaman	Jaidev	Chhaya Ganguly	Hindi
Bhairavi	Mata Saraswati Sharda Vidya Dayi Dayani	Alaap	Jaidev	Lata Mangeshkar, Dilraj Kaur	Hindi
Bhairavi	Doli Chadhte (Hi) Heer	Heer Raanjha	Madan Mohan (composer)	Lata Mangeshkar	Hindi
Bhairavi	Madhukara Shyam Hamare Chor	Bhakta Surdas	Gyan Dutt	K. L. Saigal	Hindi
Bhairavi	Sar Pe Kaddam Ki Chainya	Bhakta Surdas	Gyan Dutt	K. L. Saigal & Rajkumari Dubey & Chorus	Hindi
Bhairavi	Ab Tere Siva	Kismet (1943 film)	Anil Biswas (composer)	Amirbai Karnataki	Hindi
Bhairavi	Ai Dil Tujhe	Dulari	Naushad	Lata Mangeshkar	Hindi
Bhairavi	Ai Diwali, Ai Diwali	Rattan	Naushad	Zohrabai Ambalewali	Hindi
Bhairavi	Diya Na Bujhe Ri Aaj Hamara	Son of India (1962 film)	Naushad	Lata Mangeshkar & Chorus	Hindi
Bhairavi	Do Hanson Ka Joda Bichhad Gayo Re	Gunga Jumna	Naushad	Lata Mangeshkar	Hindi
Bhairavi	Insaf Ka Mandir Hai, Yeh Bhagavan Ka Ghar Hai	Amar (1954 film)	Naushad	Mohammed Rafi	Hindi
Bhairavi	Jaadugar Katil	Kohinoor (1960 film)	Naushad	Asha Bhosle	Hindi
Bhairavi	Jab Dil Hi Tut Gaya	Shahjehan	Naushad	K. L. Saigal	Hindi
Bhairavi	Khamosh Hai Khevana Hara Mera	Amar (1954 film)	Naushad	Lata Mangeshkar	Hindi
Bhairavi	Main To Pyaar Se Teri Piya Mang Sajaungi	Saathi (1968 film)	Naushad	Lata Mangeshkar	Hindi
Bhairavi	Tu Ganga Ki Mauj Main Jamunaa Ka Dhaaraa	Baiju Bawra (film)	Naushad	Mohammed Rafi	Hindi
Bhairavi	Tumhare Sang Main Bhi Chalungi	Sohni Mahiwal (1958 film)	Naushad	Mohammed Rafi & Lata Mangeshkar & Chorus	Hindi
Bhairavi	Tute Na Dil Tute Na	Andaz (1949 film)	Naushad	Mukesh (singer)	Hindi
Bhairavi	Yeh Zindagi Ke Mele	Mela (1948 film)	Naushad	Mohammed Rafi	Hindi
Bhairavi	Baat Chalat Nayi Chunari Rang Dari	Rani Roopmati	S. N. Tripathi	Krishnarao Chonkar & Mohammed Rafi	Hindi
Bhairavi	Ye Duniya Hai, Yanha Dil Ka	Shair	Ghulam Mohammad	Lata Mangeshkar & Mukesh (singer)	Hindi
Bhairavi	Dil Ka Khilona Haye Tut Gaya	Goonj Uthi Shehnai	Vasant Desai	Lata Mangeshkar	Hindi
Bhairavi	Jo Tum Todo Piya	Jhanak Jhanak Payal Baaje	Vasant Desai	Lata Mangeshkar	Hindi
Bhairavi	Mere Ai Dil Bata	Jhanak Jhanak Payal Baaje	Vasant Desai	Lata Mangeshkar	Hindi
Bhairavi	Sanvare Sanvare	Anuradha (1960 film)	Ravi Shankar	Lata Mangeshkar	Hindi
Bhairavi	Pagadi Sambhal Jhatta	Shaheed (1965 film)	Prem Dhawan	Mohammed Rafi	Hindi
Bhairavi	Jaa Re, Jaa Re Ud Jaa Re Panchhi	Maya (1961 film)	Salil Chowdhury	Lata Mangeshkar	Hindi
Bhairavi	Gharib Jaan Ke Ham Ko Na Tum daga Dena	Chhoo Mantar	O. P. Nayyar	Mohammed Rafi	Hindi
Bhairavi	Barasat Men, Hamse Mile Tum	Barsaat (1949 film)	Shankar–Jaikishan	Lata Mangeshkar	Hindi
Bhairavi	Chhod Gaye Balam	Barsaat (1949 film)	Shankar–Jaikishan	Lata Mangeshkar & Mukesh (singer)	Hindi
Bhairavi	Mein Zindigi Men Hardam, Rota Hi Raha Hoon	Barsaat (1949 film)	Shankar–Jaikishan	Mohammed Rafi	Hindi
Bhairavi	Awara Hun Ya Gardish Mein Hun	Awaara	Shankar–Jaikishan	Mukesh (singer)	Hindi
Bhairavi	Ghar Aya Mera Pardesi	Awaara	Shankar–Jaikishan	Lata Mangeshkar & Chorus	Hindi
Bhairavi	Khushiyon Ke Chand	Mayurpankh	Shankar–Jaikishan	Lata Mangeshkar	Hindi
Bhairavi	Mohabbat Ki Dastan Aaj Suno	Mayurpankh	Shankar–Jaikishan	Kishore Sahu & Sumitra Devi (actress) & Asha Mathur	Hindi
Bhairavi	Ai Mere Dil Kahin Aur Chal	Daag (1952 film)	Shankar–Jaikishan	Talat Mahmood	Hindi
Bhairavi	Kisi Ne Apna Bana Ke	Patita (1953 film)	Shankar–Jaikishan	Lata Mangeshkar	Hindi
Bhairavi	Raja Ki Ayegi Baraat	Aah (film)	Shankar–Jaikishan	Lata Mangeshkar	Hindi
Bhairavi	Mein Piya Teri Tu Maane Ya Maane	Basant Bahar (film)	Shankar–Jaikishan	Lata Mangeshkar	Hindi
Bhairavi	Mera Juta Hai Japani	Shree 420	Shankar–Jaikishan	Mukesh (singer)	Hindi
Bhairavi	Pyaar Hua Ikraar Hua	Shree 420	Shankar–Jaikishan	Manna Dey & Lata Mangeshkar	Hindi
Bhairavi	Ramiya Vastaavaiya	Shree 420	Shankar–Jaikishan	Lata Mangeshkar & Mohammed Rafi & Mukesh (singer)	Hindi
Bhairavi	Suno Chhoti Si Gudiya Ki Lambi Kahani	Seema (1955 film)	Shankar–Jaikishan	Lata Mangeshkar	Hindi
Bhairavi	Sab Kuch Sikha Hamne	Anari (1959 film)	Shankar–Jaikishan	Mukesh (singer)	Hindi
Bhairavi	Tera Jana	Anari (1959 film)	Shankar–Jaikishan	Lata Mangeshkar	Hindi
Bhairavi	April Fool Banaaya	April Fool (1964 film)	Shankar–Jaikishan	Mohammed Rafi	Hindi
Bhairavi	Mere Man Kii Ganga	Sangam (1964 Hindi film)	Shankar–Jaikishan	Mukesh (singer)	Hindi
Bhairavi	Dost Dost Na Raha	Sangam (1964 Hindi film)	Shankar–Jaikishan	Mukesh (singer)	Hindi
Bhairavi	Chahe Koi Mujhe Jangli Kahe	Junglee (1961 film)	Shankar–Jaikishan	Mohammed Rafi	Hindi
Bhairavi	Dil Apna Aur Preet Parai	Dil Apna Aur Preet Parai	Shankar–Jaikishan	Lata Mangeshkar	Hindi
Bhairavi	Sheesha-e-Dil Itna Na Uchha Lo	Dil Apna Aur Preet Parai	Shankar–Jaikishan	Lata Mangeshkar	Hindi
Bhairavi	Duniya Banane Wale Kya Tere Man	Teesri Kasam	Shankar–Jaikishan	Mukesh (singer)	Hindi
Bhairavi	Ek Dil Sau Afsane	Ek Dil Sau Afsane	Shankar–Jaikishan	Lata Mangeshkar	Hindi
Bhairavi	Ham Bhi Hain Tum Bhi Ho	Jis Desh Mein Ganga Behti Hai	Shankar–Jaikishan	Mukesh (singer)	Hindi
Bhairavi	Hoton Pe Sachhayi Rahati Hai	Jis Desh Mein Ganga Behti Hai	Shankar–Jaikishan	Mukesh (singer)	Hindi
Bhairavi	Mera Naam Raju	Jis Desh Mein Ganga Behti Hai	Shankar–Jaikishan	Mukesh (singer)	Hindi
Bhairavi	Jay Bolo Beiman Ki	Be-Imaan	Shankar–Jaikishan	Mukesh (singer)	Hindi
Bhairavi	Jina Yahan Marna Yahan	Mera Naam Joker	Shankar–Jaikishan	Mukesh (singer)	Hindi
Bhairavi	Kaheta Hai Joker	Mera Naam Joker	Shankar–Jaikishan	Mukesh (singer)	Hindi
Bhairavi	Kaise Samjhaun Bade Na Samajh Ho	Suraj (film)	Shankar–Jaikishan	Mohammed Rafi & Asha Bhosle	Hindi
Bhairavi	Tumhen Aur Kya Dun Main Dil Ke Sivay	Ayee Milan Ki Bela	Shankar–Jaikishan	Lata Mangeshkar	Hindi
Bhairavi	Lal Chhadi Maidan Kadi	Janwar (1965 film)	Shankar–Jaikishan	Mohammed Rafi	Hindi
Bhairavi	Main Chali Main Chali	Professor (1962 film)	Shankar–Jaikishan	Mohammed Rafi	Hindi
Bhairavi	Nas Nas Mein Agan	Jahan Pyar Miley	Shankar–Jaikishan	Lata Mangeshkar	Hindi
Bhairavi	O Shama Mujhe Funk De	Aashiq (1962 film)	Shankar–Jaikishan	Lata Mangeshkar & Mukesh (singer)	Hindi
Bhairavi	Jiske Liye Tadape Ham	Sanjh Aur Savera	Shankar–Jaikishan	Mohammed Rafi & Asha Bhosle	Hindi
Bhairavi	Bacche Man Ke Sacche	Do Kaliyaan	Ravi (composer)	Lata Mangeshkar	Hindi
Bhairavi	Bhari Duniya Men Akhir Dil Ko Samajhane Kahan Jaayen	Do Badan	Ravi (composer)	Mohammed Rafi	Hindi
Bhairavi	Chaahe Laakh Karo Tum Puja	Dus Lakh	Ravi (composer)	Mohammed Rafi & Asha Bhosle	Hindi
Bhairavi	Is Bhari Duniyan Men	Bharosa	Ravi (composer)	Mohammed Rafi	Hindi
Bhairavi	Mori Chhum Chhum Baje Payeliya	Ghunghat (1960 film)	Ravi (composer)	Lata Mangeshkar	Hindi
Bhairavi	Sajna Sajna O Sajna	Ek Phool Do Mali	Ravi (composer)	Asha Bhosle	Hindi
Bhairavi	Waqt Se Din Aur Raat	Waqt (1965 film)	Ravi (composer)	Mohammed Rafi	Hindi
Bhairavi	Tu Hindu Banega Na Musalman Banega	Dhool Ka Phool	Datta Naik	Mohammed Rafi	Hindi
Bhairavi	Sun Le Bapu Ye Paigham	Baalak	Dattaram Wadkar	Suman Kalyanpur	Hindi
Bhairavi	Jeet Hi Lenge	Shola Aur Shabnam (1961 film)	Mohammed Zahur Khayyam	Lata Mangeshkar & Mohammed Rafi	Hindi
Bhairavi	Ai Dil Ab Kahi Na Ja	Bluff Master (1963 film)	Kalyanji–Anandji	Hemant Kumar	Hindi
Bhairavi	Bane To Ban Jaye Zamana Dushman	Dulha Dulhan	Kalyanji–Anandji	Mukesh (singer) & Lata Mangeshkar	Hindi
Bhairavi	Chaliya Mera Naam	Chhalia	Kalyanji–Anandji	Mukesh (singer) & Lata Mangeshkar	Hindi
Bhairavi	Iktaara Bole	Yaadgaar (1970 film)	Kalyanji–Anandji	Mukesh (singer)	Hindi
Bhairavi	Jis Dil Me Basa Tha Pyaar Tera	Saheli(1965 film)	Kalyanji–Anandji	Mukesh (singer)	Hindi
Bhairavi	Mehendi Lagi Mere Hath Re	Mehndi Lagi Mere Haath	Kalyanji–Anandji	Lata Mangeshkar	Hindi
Bhairavi	Mera Desh Ki Dharti, Sona Ugale Ugale Hire Moti	Upkar	Kalyanji–Anandji	Mahendra Kapoor & Chorus	Hindi
Bhairavi	Mujhko Is Raat Ki Tanhai Main	Dil Bhi Tera Hum Bhi Tere	Kalyanji–Anandji	Mukesh (singer)	Hindi
Bhairavi	Sikandar Bhi Aaye...Na Koi Raha	Johar-Mehmood in Goa	Kalyanji–Anandji	Mukesh (singer) & Usha Khanna	Hindi
Bhairavi	Chingari Koi Bhadke	Amar Prem	R. D. Burman	Kishore Kumar	Hindi
Bhairavi	Hame Tumse Pyar Kitana	Kudrat	R. D. Burman	Kishore Kumar & Parveen Sultana	Hindi
Bhairavi	Kisi Baat Par Main	Bemisal	R. D. Burman	Kishore Kumar	Hindi
Bhairavi	Mile Jo Kadi Kadi, Ek Zanjeer Bane	Kasme Vaade	R. D. Burman	Mohammed Rafi & Asha Bhosle & Kishore Kumar	Hindi
Bhairavi	Mithe Bol Bole	Kinara (film)	R. D. Burman	Lata Mangeshkar & Bhupinder Singh (musician)	Hindi
Bhairavi	Menhagai Maar Gayi	Roti Kapada Aur Makaan	Laxmikant–Pyarelal	Lata Mangeshkar & Mukesh (singer) & Narendra Chanchal & Jaani Babu Qawwal	Hindi
Bhairavi	Beshaq Mandir Masjid Tode	Bobby (1973 film)	Laxmikant–Pyarelal	Narendra Chanchal	Hindi
Bhairavi	Bhor Bhaye Panghat Pe	Satyam Shivam Sundaram	Laxmikant–Pyarelal	Narendra Chanchal	Hindi
Bhairavi	Dhanya Bhag Seva Ka Avsar Paaya	Sur Sangam	Laxmikant–Pyarelal	Rajan and Sajan Mishra	Hindi
Bhairavi	Jyot Se Jyot Jagate Chalo	Sant Gyaneshwar	Laxmikant–Pyarelal	Lata Mangeshkar	Hindi
Bhairavi	Mitwa Re Mitwa Purab Na Jaio	Jawaab	Laxmikant–Pyarelal	Pankaj Udhas	Hindi
Bhairavi	Zihaal-e-Mastii, Makun-b-Ranjish	Ghulami	Laxmikant–Pyarelal	Lata Mangeshkar & Shabbir Kumar	Hindi
Bhairavi	Teri Nigahon Pe Mar	Shabnam	Usha Khanna	Mukesh (singer)	Hindi
Bhairavi	Kisi Nazar Ko Tera Intazar Aja Bhi Hai	Aitbaar	Bappi Lahiri	Asha Bhosle & Bhupinder Singh (musician)	Hindi
Bhairavi	Mere Khwabon Ka Har Aik Naksh	Jism (2003 film)	M. M. Kreem	Udit Narayan	Hindi
Bhairavi	Saan	Jab Tak Hain Jaan	A. R. Rahman	Shreya Ghoshal & Mohit Chauhan	Hindi
Bhairavi	Mera Rang De Basanti Chola	The Legend of Bhagat Singh	A. R. Rahman	Sonu Nigam & Manmohan Waris	Hindi
Bhairavi	Sapno Se Bhare Naina	Luck by Chance	Shankar–Ehsaan–Loy	Shankar Mahadevan	Hindi
Bhairavi	Dil Dance Mare	Tashan (film)	Vishal–Shekhar	Sukhwinder Singh	Hindi
Bhargavi (raga)	Ye Raasathi	En Uyir Thozhan	Ilaiyaraaja	Malaysia Vasudevan	
Bhairavi (Carnatic)	Indu Enage Govinda	Mantralaya Mahatme	Raghavendra Swami composition used in the film by Rajan–Nagendra	P. B. Sreenivas	Kannada
Bhatiyar & Sama / Yadukulakamboji	Manasa Sancharare	Sankarabharanam	K. V. Mahadevan	Vani Jairam	Telugu
Bhatiyar	Naan Paadikkonde Iruppen	Sirai	M. S. Viswanathan	Vani Jairam	
Bhatiyar	Aayo Prabhat	Sur Sangam	Laxmikant–Pyarelal	Rajan of Rajan and Sajan Mishra & S. Janaki	Hindi
Bhatiyar	Naina Neer	Water	A.R. Rahman	Sadhana Sargam	
Bheem / Gavati	Ek Saathi Aur Bhi Tha	LOC: Kargil	Anu Malik	Sonu Nigam	Hindi
Bheem / Gavati	Monolisa	Mr. Romeo	A. R. Rahman		
Bheem / Gavati	Chalo Chale Mitwa	Nayak (2001 Hindi film)	A. R. Rahman	Udit Narayan & Kavita Krishnamurthy	
Bheem / Gavati	Kariye Na	Taal (film)	A. R. Rahman	Sukhwinder Singh & Alka Yagnik	Hindi
Bheem / Gavati	Baat Meri Suniye To Zara	Kuch Naa Kaho	Shankar–Ehsaan–Loy	Shankar Mahadevan & Mahalakshmi Iyer	Hindi
Bhoopeshwari / Vaasanthi	Mitwa	Lagaan	A. R. Rahman	Udit Narayan	
Bhupal Todi/Bhupalam	Meluko SreeRama Meluko	Sri Ramanjaneya Yuddham	K. V. Mahadevan	M. Balamuralikrishna & P. Leela	Telugu
Bhupal Todi/Bhupalam	Lakshmi Nivasa	Sri Venkateswara Mahatyam	Pendyala (composer)	Ghantasala (musician)	Telugu
Bhupal Todi/Bhupalam	Toli sandhya velalo	Sita Ramulu	Satyam (composer)	S. P. Balasubrahmanyam	Telugu
Bhupal Todi/Bhupalam	Udaya Kirana Rekhalo	Srivari Muchatlu	K. Chakravarthy	S. P. Balasubrahmanyam&S. Janaki	Telugu
Bhupal Todi/Bhupalam	Theel Vizhunda	Godfather (2012 film)	A. R. Rahman	A. R. Rahman	Tamil & Kannada
Bihag	Tere Sur Aur Mere Geet	Goonj Uthi Shehnai	Vasant Desai	Lata Mangeshkar & Mohammed Rafi	Hindi
Bihag	Boliye Surili Boliyan	Griha Pravesh	Kanu Roy	Bhupinder Singh (musician) & Sulakshana Pandit	Hindi
Bihag	Banke Chakori Gori Jhum Jhum Nachegi	Hum Matwale Naujahan	Chitragupt (composer)	Mukesh (singer)	Hindi
Bihag	Koi Gata Main So Jata	Alaap	Jaidev	K. J. Yesudas	Hindi
Bihag	Ai Dil Beqarar Kyun	Shahjehan	Naushad	K. L. Saigal	Hindi
Bihag	Chalenge Tir Jab Dil Par	Kohinoor (1960 film)	Naushad	Lata Mangeshkar & Mohammed Rafi	Hindi
Bihag	Hamare Dil Se Na Jana	Uran Khatola (film)	Naushad	Lata Mangeshkar	Hindi
Bihag	Meri Ladli Re Meri Ladli	Andaz (1949 film)	Naushad	Lata Mangeshkar & Chorus	Hindi
Bihag	Tere Pyar Mein Dildar	Mere Mehboob	Naushad	Lata Mangeshkar	Hindi
Bihag / Behag	Varamosage Vanamali	Bhakta Prahlada (1967 film)	S. Rajeswara Rao	M. Balamuralikrishna	Telugu
Bihag	Yeh Kya Jagah Hai Doston	Umrao Jaan (1981 film)	Mohammed Zahur Khayyam	Asha Bhosle	Hindi
Bihag	Karedaru Kelade	Sanaadi Appanna	G. K. Venkatesh	S. Janaki & Bismillah Khan	Kannada
Bihag	Zindagi Ke Safar Men Guzar Jate Hain Jo Makam	Aap Ki Kasam	R. D. Burman	Kishore Kumar	Hindi
Bihag	Hey Oraayiram	Meendum Kokila	Ilaiyaraaja	S. P. Balasubrahmanyam	
Bihag	Kai Veenaiyai	Vietnam Colony (1994 film)	Ilaiyaraaja	Bombay Jayashree	
Bihag	Un Paarvaiyil	Amman Kovil Kizhakale	Ilaiyaraaja	K. S. Chithra, K. J. Yesudas	
Bihag	Malargal Kaettaen	OK Kanmani	A.R. Rahman	K.S. Chitra	
Bilahari	Koondhalile Megam Vanthu (Tamil) / Kurulande Megham Varishi (Telugu)	Bala Nagamma (1981 film)	Ilaiyaraaja	K. J. Yesudas	
Bilahari	Nee Ondruthaana Sangeetham (Tamil) / Neethone (Telugu)	Unnal Mudiyum Thambi, Rudraveena (film)	Ilaiyaraaja	K. J. Yesudas	
Bilahari	Kanna Nee Thoongada	Bahubali 2: The Conclusion	M. M. Keeravani	Nayana Nair	Telugu
Bilahari	Omana Penne	Vinnaithaandi Varuvaayaa	A. R. Rahman	Benny Dayal, Kalyani Menon	
Bilahari	Kadhal Anukkal	Enthiran	A. R. Rahman	Vijay Prakash & Shreya Ghosal	
Bilahari	Netru Illadha Matram	Pudhiya Mugam	A. R. Rahman	Sujatha Mohan	
Bilahari	Poo Pookkum Osai	Minsara Kanavu	A. R. Rahman	Sujatha Mohan	
Bilahari	Vaanga Makkan Vaanga	Kaaviyathalaivan	A. R. Rahman	Haricharan	
Bilahari	Pookkalae Sattru Oyivedungal	I	A. R. Rahman	Haricharan & Shreya Ghosal	
Bilahari	Azhagiye	Kaatru Veliyidai	A. R. Rahman	Haricharan, Arjun Chandy, Jonita Gandhi	
Bilaskhani Todi	Jhoothe Naina Bole Sanchi Bateeyan	Lekin...	Hridaynath Mangeshkar	Asha Bhosle	Hindi
Bowli(C) /Revagupti(C) / Bibhas(H) / Rewa(H)	Vinnapaalu vinavale vinta vintalu	Anuraagam(1963 film)	Pendyala (composer)	P. Bhanumati	Telugu
Bowli(C) /Revagupti(C) / Bibhas(H) / Rewa(H)	Kanumusina Kanipinche Nijamedira	Santhanam (film)	Susarla Dakshinamurthi	Ghantasala (musician)	Telugu
Bowli(C) /Revagupti(C) / Bibhas(H) / Rewa(H)	Oru Ponmaanai	Mythili Ennai Kaathali	T. Rajendar	S. P. Balasubrahmanyam	
Brindavani Sarang	Ghata Ghanaghor Ghor	Tansen (film)	Khemchand Prakash	Khursheed Bano	Hindi
Brindavani Sarang	Aaja Bhanvara Suni Dagar	Rani Roopmati(1959)	S. N. Tripathi	Lata Mangeshkar	Hindi
Brindavani Sarang	Jhananana Jhan Baje Payaliya	Rani Roopmati(1959)	S. N. Tripathi	Lata Mangeshkar & Mohammed Rafi	Hindi
Brindavani Sarang	Tum Sang Akhiyan Milake	Sunehre Din	Gyan Dutt	Surinder Kaur	Hindi
Brindavani Sarang	Nee Leela Loney	Uma Chandi Gowri Sankarula Katha	Pendyala (composer)	Ghantasala (musician) & P. Susheela	Telugu
Brindavani Sarang	Kaare Kaare Badara	Bhabhi (1957 film)	Chitragupt (composer)	Lata Mangeshkar	Hindi
Brindavani Sarang	Saavan Aye Ya Na Aye	Dil Diya Dard Liya	Naushad	Mohammed Rafi & Asha Bhosle	Hindi
Brindavani Sarang	Chupulu Kalasina Shubha Vela	Mayabazaar	Ghantasala	Ghantasala & P. Leela	Telugu
Brindavani Sarang	Pyar Hamara Munna	Sansar(1951 film)	Emani Sankara Sastry & M. D. Parthasarathy & B.S. Kalla	Lata Mangeshkar	Hindi
Brindavani Sarang	Mana Bhavana Sawan Aya	Chandralekha (1948 film)	S. Rajeswara Rao	Tun Tun	Telugu & Hindi
Brindavani Sarang	Jaadugar Sainyan	Nagin (1954 film)	Hemant Kumar	Lata Mangeshkar	Hindi
Brindavani Sarang	O Priyurala	Chakrapani (film)	P. Bhanumathi	A. M. Rajah	Telugu & Hindi
Brindavani Sarang	Meri Jaan Balle Balle	Kashmir Ki Kali	O. P. Nayyar	Mohammed Rafi & Asha Bhosle	Hindi
Brindavani Sarang	Jhuthi Muthi Mitwa Avan Bole	Rudaali	Bhupen Hazarika	Lata Mangeshkar	Hindi
Brindavani Sarang	Idi naa priya nartana vela	Mayuri (film)	S. P. Balasubrahmanyam	S. Janaki	Telugu
Brindavani Sarang	Thumbi Thullal	Cobra	A.R. Rahman	Shreya Ghoshal, Nakul Abhyankar	
Brindavani Sarang	Sada Kannale	Kaviratna Kalidasa	M. Ranga Rao	Dr. Rajkumar, Vani Jairam	Kannada
Chakravākam	Ullathil Nalla Ullam	Karnan	Viswanathan-Ramamurthy	Sirkazhi Govindarajan	
Chakravākam	Chalakku Chalakku Selai	Chembaruthi	Ilaiyaraaja	Mano, S. Janaki	
Chakravākam	Halli Laavaniyali Laali	Nammoora Mandara Hoove	Ilaiyaraaja	S. P. Balasubrahmanyam, K. S. Chithra	Kannada
Chakravākam	Kelisade Prema Veda	Gulabi	Ilaiyaraaja	S. P. Balasubrahmanyam, K. S. Chithra	Kannada
Chakravākam	Nee Paathi Naan Paathi Kanne	Keladi Kanmani	Ilaiyaraaja	K. J. Yesudas, Uma Ramanan	
Chakravākam	Poojaikkaaga Vaazhum Poovai	Kaadhal Oviyam	Ilaiyaraaja	Deepan Chakravarthy	
Chakravākam	Poongaatre Konjam	Friends (2001 film)	Ilaiyaraaja	Hariharan	
Chakravākam	Vaanile Thenila	Kaakki Sattai	Ilaiyaraaja	S. P. Balasubrahmanyam, S. Janaki	
Chakravākam	Vanithamani Vannamogini	Vikram (1986 Tamil film)	Ilaiyaraaja	S. P. Balasubrahmanyam, S. Janaki	
Chakravākam	Ee Bhoomi Bannada Buguri	Mahakshathriya	Hamsalekha	S. P. Balasubrahmanyam	Kannada
Chalanata	Vennila Venilla	Iruvar	A. R. Rahman	Asha Bhosle	
Chalanata	Spider Man	Naani	A. R. Rahman	Kunal Ganjawala & Gopika Poornima	
Chandrakauns	San sanan jare o pawan	Sampoorna Ramayana	Vasant Desai	Lata Mangeshkar	Hindi
Chandrakauns	Sabar Ka Phal	Atithee	Kalyanji Anandji	Manna Dey	Hindi
Chandrakauns	Tu Hi Tu Hai Main Dekha Karoon	Sunehri Nagin	Kalyanji-Anandji	Lata Mangeshkar	Hindi
Chandrakauns	Maalai Pozhudhin Mayakkathile	Bhagyalakshmi	Viswanathan–Ramamoorthy	P. Susheela	
Chandrakauns	Anuvu Anuvuna Velasina Deva Kanuvelugai Mamu Nadipimpa Rava	Manavudu Danavudu	G.Aswathama	S. P. Balasubrahmanyam	Telugu
Chandrakauns	Azhagu Malar Aada	Vaidehi Kathirunthal	Ilaiyaraaja	S. Janaki & Raghavendar	
Chandrakauns	Ithuvarai Naan	Konji Pesalam	Ilaiyaraaja	Tippu	
Chandrakauns	Naan Thedum Sevvandhi	Dharma Pathini	Ilaiyaraaja	Ilaiyaraaja & S. Janaki	
Chandrakauns	Naanaga Naanille	Thoongadhey Thambi Thoongadhey	Ilaiyaraaja	S. P. Balasubrahmanyam	
Chandrakauns	Paadavandathor Gaanam	Ilamai Kaalangal	Ilaiyaraaja	K. J. Yesudas & P. Susheela	
Chandrakauns	Unna Ninaichu	Raasaiyya	Ilaiyaraaja	Mano & K. S. Chithra	
Chandrakauns	Velli Salangaigal	Kaadhal Oviyam	Ilaiyaraaja	S. P. Balasubrahmanyam	
Chandrakauns	Aakasana Suryudundadu Navvave Nava Mallikaa Aashale- I M & II F	Sundarakanda (1992 film)	M. M. Keeravani	S. P. BalasubrahmanyamI M & K S ChitraII F	Telugu
Chandrakauns	Bharata Veda Mukha	Pournami	Devi Sri Prasad	K S Chitra	Telugu
Charukesi	Bhali Bhali Bhali Bhali Devayya	Mayabazaar	Ghantasala	Ghantasala	Telugu
Charukesi	Bedardi Balama	Arzoo (1965 film)	Shankar–Jaikishan	Lata Mangeshkar	Hindi
Charukesi	Bainya Na Dharo	Dastak (1970 film)	Madan Mohan (composer)	Lata Mangeshkar	Hindi
Charukesi	Akele Hain Chale Ao	Raaz (1967 film)	Kalyanji–Anandji	Lata Mangeshkar & Mohammed Rafi	Hindi
Charukesi	Bekhudi Mein Sanam	Haseena Maan Jayegi	Kalyanji–Anandji	Lata Mangeshkar & Mohammed Rafi	Hindi
Charukesi	Chhod De Saari Duniya Kisi Ke Liye	Saraswatichandra (film)	Kalyanji–Anandji	Lata Mangeshkar	Hindi
Charukesi	Ek Tu Jo Mila	Himalay Ki God Mein	Kalyanji–Anandji	Lata Mangeshkar	Hindi
Charukesi	Jaan-E-Jaana	Janbaaz	Kalyanji–Anandji	Sapna Mukherjee & Mahesh Gadhavai	Hindi
Charukesi	Mere Hamsafar	Mere Humsafar	Kalyanji–Anandji	Lata Mangeshkar & Mukesh (singer)	Hindi
Charukesi	Koi Jab Tumhara Hriday Tood De	Purab Aur Paschim	Kalyanji–Anandji	Mukesh (singer)	Hindi
Charukesi	Mohabbat Ke Suhane Din	Maryada (1971 film)	Kalyanji–Anandji	Mohammed Rafi	Hindi
Charukesi	"Vrepalle Vechenu Venuvu Vechenu"	Sarada (1973 film)	K. Chakravarthy	P. Susheela	Telugu
Charukesi	Chalo Sajna Jahaan Tak	Mere Hamdam Mere Dost	Laxmikant–Pyarelal	Lata Mangeshkar	Hindi
Charukesi	Megha Re Megha Re	Pyaasa Sawan	Laxmikant–Pyarelal	Lata Mangeshkar & Suresh Wadkar	Hindi
Charukesi	"Balegara Chennaiah"	Mysore Mallige(1992 film)	C. Ashwath	S. P. Balasubrahmanyam	Kannada
Charukesi	Shyam Teri Bansi Pukare Radha Naam	Geet Gaata Chal	Ravindra Jain	Aarti Mukherjee & Jaspal Singh (singer)	Hindi
Charukesi	Teri Ummid Tera Intzaar Karte Hai	Deewana (1992 film)	Nadeem–Shravan	Kumar Sanu & Sadhana Sargam	Hindi
Charukesi	Chaand aaya hai zameen par	Dil Hi Dil Mein	A. R. Rahman		
Charukesi	Sollividu Sollividu	Kaaviya Thalaivan (2014 film)	A. R. Rahman		
Charukesi	Udhaya Udhaya	Udhaya	A. R. Rahman	Hariharan & Sadhana Sargam	
Charukesi & Keeravani	Unmai Orunaal Vellum	Lingaa	A. R. Rahman	Haricharan	
Charukesi & Nat Bhairav	Rang de	Thakshak	A. R. Rahman		
Charukesi	Thandiya	Kadhalar Dhinam	A. R. Rahman		
Charukesi	Ahista Ahista	Swades	A. R. Rahman	Udit Narayan	
Charukesi	Tu Hi Re (Antara only)	Bombay (film)	A. R. Rahman	Hariharan (singer)	
Charukesi	Yedho Yedho	Enakku 20 Unakku 18	A. R. Rahman		
Charukesi	Nenjil Nenjil	Engeyum Kadhal	Harris Jayaraj	Harish Raghavendra & Chinmayi	
Charukesi	Bombeyatavayya	Shruthi Seridaaga	T. G. Lingappa	Dr. Rajkumar	Kannada
Deepak	"Diya Jalao"	Tansen (film)	Khemchand Prakash	K. L. Saigal	Hindi
Deepak	"Deepak Jalao Jyoti Jagao"	Sangeet Samrat Tansen	S. N. Tripathi	Mohammed Rafi	Hindi
Deepak	"Deepak kathana karata raga lakshan "	Swarasadhana TV show	Kaivalya Kumar Gurav	Kaivalya Kumar Gurav	Hindi
Darbari Kanada	Pavana Guna Rama	Bhakta Potana	V. Nagayya	V. Nagayya	Telugu
Darbari Kanada	Duniya Bananewale	Ziddi (1964 film)	S. D. Burman	Manna Dey	Hindi
Darbari Kanada	Mitava Laut Aye Ri	Sangeet Samrat Tansen	S. N. Tripathi	Manna Dey	Hindi
Darbari Kanada	Ud Ja Bhanwar Maya Kamal Ka	Rani Roopmati(1959 film)	S. N. Tripathi	Manna Dey	Hindi
Darbari Kanada	Konjum Salangai Oli	Konjum Salangai	S. M. Subbaiah Naidu	P. Leela	
Darbari Kanada	Mullai Malar Mele	Uthama Puthiran	G. Ramanathan	T. M. Soundararajan & P. Susheela	
Darbari Kanada	Dil Jalta Hai To Jalane De	Pahali nazar(1945 film)	Anil Biswas (composer)	Mukesh (singer)	Hindi
Darbari Kanada	Nainheen Ko Raah Dikha Prabhu	Bhakta Surdas	Gyan Dutt	Mukesh (singer)	Hindi
Darbari Kanada	Sivasankari Sivanandalahari	Jagadeka Veeruni Katha	Pendyala (composer)	Ghantasala	Telugu
Darbari Kanada	Namo Bhootanatha	Satya Harishchandra (1965 Telugu film)	Pendyala (composer)	Ghantasala (musician) & S. Varalakshmi	Telugu
Darbari Kanada	Teri Duniya Mein Dil Lagta Nahin	Bawre Nain	Roshan (music director)	Mukesh (singer)	Hindi
Darbari Kanada	Woh Mohabbat Woh Wafhayen	Noor Jehan (film)	Roshan (music director)	Mohammed Rafi	Hindi
Darbari Kanada	Kitna Hasin Hai Mausam	Azaad (1955 film)	C. Ramchandra	Lata Mangeshkar & C. Ramchandra	Hindi
Darbari Kanada	Chinnan Chiriya Vanna Paravai	Kungumam	K. V. Mahadevan	T. M. Soundararajan & S. Janaki	
Darbari Kanada	En Ippadi Komanathadum (Viruttam) preceding Pazham Neeyappa	Thiruvilayadal	K. V. Mahadevan	K. B. Sundarambal	
Darbari Kanada	Daiya Re Daiya Laj Mohe Lage	Leader (1964 film)	Naushad	Asha Bhosle	Hindi
Darbari Kanada	Duniya Badal Gayi	Babul (1950 film)	Naushad	Talat Mahmood & Shamshad Begum	Hindi
Darbari Kanada	Guzre Hain Aaj Ishq Men	Dil Diya Dard Liya	Naushad	Mohammed Rafi	Hindi
Darbari Kanada	Kabhi Dil Dil Se Takarata To Hoga	Anokhi Ada (1948 film)	Naushad	Shamshad Begum	Hindi
Darbari Kanada	Mohabbat Ki Jhuti Kahani Pe Roye	Mughal-e-Azam	Naushad	Lata Mangeshkar	Hindi
Darbari Kanada	O Duniya Ke Rakhwale	Baiju Bawra (film)	Naushad	Mohammed Rafi	Hindi
Darbari Kanada	Tumse Hi Ghar Ghar Kahalaya	Bhabhi Ki Chudiyan	Sudhir Phadke	Mukesh (singer)	Hindi
Darbari Kanada	Ab Mori Vinti Suno Bhagwaan	Taj(1956 film)	Hemant Kumar	Mohammed Rafi	Hindi
Darbari Kanada	Ab Kahan Jayen Ham	Ujala (film)	Shankar–Jaikishan	Manna Dey	Hindi
Darbari Kanada	Ham Tujh Se Muhabbat Kar Ke	Awaara	Shankar–Jaikishan	Mukesh (singer)	Hindi
Darbari Kanada	Jhanak Jhanak Tori Baje Payeliya	Mere Huzoor	Shankar–Jaikishan	Manna Dey	Hindi
Darbari Kanada	Koi Matwala Ayaa Mere Dware	Love in Tokyo	Shankar–Jaikishan	Lata Mangeshkar	Hindi
Darbari Kanada	Tu Pyar Ka Sagar Hai	Seema (1955 film)	Shankar–Jaikishan	Manna Dey & Chorus	Hindi
Darbari Kanada	Aanati Kaavalena gaanaaniki samayamu	Amara Sandesam(1954 film)	K.Prasada Rao & Kelkar		Telugu
Darbari Kanada	Sarfaroshi Ki Tammana	Shaheed (1965 film)	Prem Dhawan	Mohammed Rafi & Manna Dey & Rajendra Mehta	Hindi
Darbari Kanada	Agar Mujhse Muhobbat Hai	Aap Ki Parchhaiyan	Madan Mohan (composer)	Lata Mangeshkar	Hindi
Darbari Kanada	Basti Basti Parbat Parbat	Railway Platform (film)	Madan Mohan (composer)	Mohammed Rafi	Hindi
Darbari Kanada	Main Nigahen Tere Chehare se	Aap Ki Parchhaiyan	Madan Mohan (composer)	Mohammed Rafi	Hindi
Darbari Kanada	Tere Dar Pe Ayaa Hun	Laila Majnu (1976 film)	Madan Mohan (composer)	Mohammed Rafi	Hindi
Darbari Kanada	Tuthe Hue Khvabon Ne	Madhumati	Salil Chowdhury	Mohammed Rafi	Hindi
Darbari Kanada	Raha Gardishon Men Haradam	Do Badan	Ravi (composer)	Mohammed Rafi	Hindi
Darbari Kanada	Tora Man Darpan Kahalay	Kaajal	Ravi (composer)	Asha Bhosle	Hindi
Darbari Kanada	Chandi Ki Divar Na Todi	Vishwas (film)	Kalyanji–Anandji	Mukesh (singer)	Hindi
Darbari Kanada	Tumhe Zindagi Ke Ujale Mubarak	Purnima (film)	Kalyanji–Anandji	Mukesh (singer)	Hindi
Darbari Kanada	Ponnenben Sirupoo Enben	Policekaran Magal	Viswanathan–Ramamoorthy	P. B. Sreenivas & S. Janaki	
Darbari Kanada	Kelviyin Nayagane	Apoorva Raagangal	M. S. Viswanathan	Vani Jairam & B. S. Sasi Rekha	
Darbari Kanada	Vasanthathil Or Naal	Moondru Daivangal	M. S. Viswanathan	P. Susheela	
Darbari Kanada	Nee Kougililo Taladachi Nee Chetulalo Kanumoosi	Karthika Deepam (film)	Satyam (composer)	P. Susheela	
Darbari Kanada	Maruthamalai Mamaniye	Deivam	Kunnakudi Vaidyanathan	Madurai Somu	
Darbari Kanada	Suhani Chaandni Raaten Hamen Sone Nahin Deti	Mukti (1977 film)	Laxmikant–Pyarelal	Mukesh (singer)	Hindi
Darbari Kanada	Satyam Shivam Sundaram	Satyam Shivam Sundaram	Laxmikant–Pyarelal	Lata Mangeshkar	Hindi
Darbari Kanada	Mere Mehboob Shayad Aaj Kuchh	Kitne Paas Kitne Door (1976 film)	Chand Pardesi	Chandrani Mukherjee	Hindi
Darbari Kanada	Ham Tum Se Juda Ho Ke	Ek Sapera Ek Lutera(1965 film)	Usha Khanna	Mohammed Rafi	Hindi
Darbari Kanada	Aagaya Vennilavae	Arangetra Velai	Ilaiyaraaja	K. J. Yesudas & Uma Ramanan	
Darbari Kanada	Kalyaana Thaen Nilaa	Mounam Sammadham	Ilaiyaraaja	K. J. Yesudas & K. S. Chithra	
Darbari Kanada	Poomaalai Vaangi Vanthaan	Sindhu Bhairavi	Ilaiyaraaja	K. J. Yesudas	
Darbari Kanada	Maarugo Maarugo 1995	Sathi Leelavathi (1995 film)	Ilaiyaraaja	Kamal Haasan, K. S. Chithra	
Darbari Kanada	Pag Ghoongroo Bandh Meera Naachi Thi	Namak Halaal	Bappi Lahiri	Kishore Kumar	Hindi
Darbari Kanada	Dekha Hai Pehli Baar	Saajan	Nadeem–Shravan	S. P. Balasubrahmanyam & Alka Yagnik	Hindi
Darbari Kanada	Shairana Si Hai Zindagi Ki Faza	Phir Teri Kahani Yaad Aayee	Anu Malik	Alka Yagnik	Hindi
Darbari Kanada	Malare Mounama	Karnaa	Vidyasagar	S. P. Balasubrahmanyam & S. Janaki	
Darbari Kanada	Orey manam Orey Gunam	Villain	Vidyasagar	Hariharan, Sadhana Bala	
Darbari Kanada	Naane Varugiren	OK Kanmani	A. R. Rahman	Shashaa Tirupati & D. Sathyaprakash	
Darbari Kanada	Veera Raja Veera	Ponniyin Selvan: II	A. R. Rahman	Shankar Mahadevan & Harini & K. S. Chithra	
Darbari Kanada	Kaatre En Vaasal Vandhai	Rhythm	A R Rahman	Unnikrishnan & Kavitha Krishnamurthy	
Darbari Kanada	Jogi Aaya	Black & White (2008 Hindi film)	Sukhwinder Singh	Sukhwinder Singh & Sadhana Sargam	Hindi
Darbari Kanada	Tu Jo Nahin Hai to Kuch Bhi Nahin Hai	Woh Lamhe...	Pritam	Glenn John	Hindi
Darbari kanada	Irava Pagala	Poovellam Kettuppar	Yuvan Shankar Raja	Hariharan & Sujatha	
Darbari kanada	Vinothane	Thennavan	Yuvan Shankar Raja	Srinivas & Mahalakshmi	
Darbari Kanada	Pookal Pookum Tharunam	Madrasapattinam	G V Prakash Kumar	Roop Kumar Rathod & Harini	
Darbari Kanada	Azhage Azhage yethuvum azhage	Saivam	G. V. Prakash Kumar	Uthara Unnikrishnan	
Darbari Kanada	Namo Bhootanatha	Satya Harishchandra	Pendyala Nageswara Rao	Ghantasala, P. Susheela	Kannada
Darbār	Maraivai Pudhaitha	Thiruneelakantar	Papanasam Sivan	M. K. Thyagaraja Bhagavathar	
Darbār & Maand	Unnavaa Asalunnavaa	Bhakta Tukaram	P. Adinarayana Rao	Ghantasala (musician)	Telugu
Darbār, Maand, Hanumatodi, Mohanam, Kanada	Oru Naal Pothuma	Thiruvilayadal	K. V. Mahadevan	M. Balamuralikrishna	
Darbār & Maand	Amma Bangaru Thalli	Palnati Yuddham (1966 film)	S. Rajeswara Rao	P. Susheela	Telugu
Darbār	Yochana Kamalalochana	Sindhu Bhairavi	Ilaiyaraaja	K. J. Yesudas & M. Balamuralikrishna	
Desh	Paadave Ragamayi	Sita Rama Kalyanam (1961 film)	Gali Penchala Narasimha Rao	P. Susheela	Telugu
Desh	Dukh Ke Ab Din Bitat Nahi	Devdas (1936 film)	Raichand Boral & Pankaj Mullick & Timir Baran	K. L. Saigal	Hindi
Desh	Sainya Ja Ja Mose Na Bolo Kahe Ko Neha Lagaye	Jhanak Jhanak Payal Baaje	Vasant Desai	Lata Mangeshkar	Hindi
Desh	Phir Kahin Koi Phul Khila	Anubhav (1971 film)	Kanu Roy	Manna Dey	Hindi
Desh	Mere Pyar Men Tujhe Kya Mila	Maan(1954 film)	Anil Biswas (composer)	Lata Mangeshkar	Hindi
Desh	Kadam Chale Age	Bhakta Surdas	Gyan Dutt	K. L. Saigal	Hindi
Desh	Gori Tore Naina, Nainava Kajar Bin Kare Kare	Main Suhagan Hun(1964 film)	Lachhiram Tomar	Mohammed Rafi & Asha Bhosle	Hindi
Desh	Aaji Ruth Kar Ab Kahan Jaiega	Arzoo (1965 film)	Shankar–Jaikishan	Lata Mangeshkar & Mohammed Rafi	Hindi
Desh	Takdir Ka Fasaana	Sehra (film)	Ramlal Hirapanna Chowdhury	Lata Mangeshkar & Mohammed Rafi	Hindi
Desh	Aap Ko Pyar Chupane Ki Buri Adat Hai	Neela Aakash	Madan Mohan (composer)	Asha Bhosle & Mohammed Rafi	Hindi
Desh	Beqasi Had Se Jab Guzar Jaye	Kalpana (1960 film)	O. P. Nayyar	Asha Bhosle	Hindi
Desh	Mana Mere Haseen Sanam	The Adventures Of Robinhood and Bandits(1965 film)	G.S.Kohli	Mohammed Rafi	Hindi
Desh	Man Mandira	Katyar Kaljat Ghusali (film)	Jitendra Abhisheki	Shankar Mahadevan	Marathi
Desh	Milne Ka Din Aa Gaya	Tadbir	Lal Mohammad Iqbal	K. L. Saigal & Suraiya	Hindi
Desh	Enthe Innum Vanneela	Gramophone	Vidyasagar	P. Jayachandran, Jeemon KJ, Chorus	
Desh	Agar Tum Saath Ho	Tamasha (2015 film)	A. R. Rahman	Arijit Singh & Alka Yagnik	
Desh	Choti Si Chiraiya	Mimi (2021 Hindi film)	A. R. Rahman	Kailash Kher	
Desh / Desh Malhar	Sarfaroshi ki tamanna (slow version)	The Legend of Bhagat Singh	A. R. Rahman	Sonu Nigam & Hariharan (singer)	Hindi
Desh, Maand, Shivaranjani, Harikambhoji	Alli Arjuna	Kaaviya Thalaivan (2014 film)	A. R. Rahman		
Deshkar	Tella vaara vachhe naa saami	Chiranjeevulu (1956 film)	Ghantasala (musician)	P. Leela	Telugu
Deshkar	Sayonara Sayonara	Love in Tokyo	Shankar–Jaikishan	Lata Mangeshkar	Hindi
Desi (raga)	O Sakhi Oho Cheli Oho madiya mohini	Jagadeka Veeruni Katha	Pendyala (composer)	Ghantasala (musician)	Telugu
Desi (raga)	Tirumala Tirupati Venkateswara	Mahamantri Timmarusu (film)	Pendyala (composer)	S. Varalakshmi & P. Susheela	Telugu
Desi (raga)	Momu chooda veduka gomu chooda	Bhaktha Sabari	Pendyala (composer)		Telugu
Desi (raga)	Annee manchi sakunamule	Sri Krishnarjuna Yuddhamu	Pendyala (composer)	Ghantasala (musician) & P. Susheela	Telugu
Desi (raga)	Enta dooramo adi enta dooramo	Ekaveera	K. V. Mahadevan	P. Susheela	Telugu
Desi (raga)	Aaj Gaavat Man Mero Jhumke	Baiju Bawra (film)	Naushad	D. V. Paluskar & Amir Khan (singer)	Hindi
Desi (raga)	Aligina velane chudali gokula krishnuni andalu	Gundamma Katha	Ghantasala (musician)	P. Susheela	Telugu
Desi (raga)	Venuganaloluni gana veyi kannulu	Rendu Kutumbala katha(1970 film)	Ghantasala (musician)	P. Susheela	Telugu
Desi (raga)	Vardhillu maa talli vardhillavamma	Mayabazar	Ghantasala (musician)	P. Leela & Chorus	Telugu
Devagandhari	Jab Dil Ko Satae Gam	Sargam (1950 film)	C. Ramchandra	Lata Mangeshkar & Chorus	Hindi
Dhanyasi	Katuka Kantineeru (Potana poem)	Bhakta Potana	V. Nagayya	V. Nagayya	Telugu
Dhanyasi	Sakala Kalyanabhusha	Sri Venkateswara Mahatyam	Pendyala (composer)	Madhavapeddi Satyam	Telugu
Dhanyasi Suddha	Majaa Majaa	Sillunu Oru Kaadhal	A. R. Rahman		
Dharmavati	Omkara Pranava Mantra Swaroopam	Maaligai	Mahesh Mahadev	Priyadarshini	
Dharmavati	Idhu sugam sugam	Vandicholai Chinraasu	A. R. Rahman	S.P. Balasubrahmanyam & Vani Jairam	
Dharmavati & Shivaranjani	Dingu Dongu	Sarvam Thaala Mayam	A. R. Rahman	Bamba Bakya & Anthony Daasan	
Dharmavati	Hello My Dear Wrong Number	Manmadha Leelai	M. S. Viswanathan	K. J. Yesudas & L. R. Eswari	
Dharmavati	Ilamcholai Poothathaa	Unakagave Vazhgiraen	Ilaiyaraaja	S. P. Balasubrahmanyam	
Dharmavati	Meendum Meendum Vaa	Vikram	Ilaiyaraaja	S. P. Balasubrahmanyam & S. Janaki	
Dharmavati	Nandhaa En Nila	Nandha En Nila	V. Dakshinamoorthy	S. P. Balasubrahmanyam	
Dharmavati	Tha Thi Thom	Azhagan	Maragatha Mani	K. S. Chithra	
Dharmavati	Vaanaville Vaanaville	Ramana	Ilaiyaraaja	Hariharan, Ilaiyaraaja and Sadhana Sargam	
Dharmavati	Ottagathai Kattiko	Gentleman	A. R. Rahman	S. P. Balasubrahmanyam & S. Janaki	
Durga / Shuddha Saveri	Hum Intezar Karenge	Bahu Begum	Roshan (music director)	Mohammed Rafi	Hindi
Durga / Shuddha Saveri	Brindavan Ka Krishna Kanhaiya	Miss Mary (1957 film)	Hemant Kumar	Lata Mangeshkar & Mohammed Rafi	Hindi
Durga / Shuddha Saveri	Ninna Leni andamedo	Pooja Phalam	S. Rajeswara Rao	Ghantasala (musician)	Telugu
Durga / Shuddha Saveri	Geet Gaya Pattharon Ne	Geet Gaya Patharon Ne	Ramlal Hirapanna Chowdhury	Asha Bhosle	Hindi
Durga / Shuddha Saveri / Arabhi	Hoga Tumse Pyara Kaun	Zamane Ko Dikhana Hai	R D Burman	Shailendra Singh	Hindi
Durga / Shuddha Saveri	Chanda Re Mori Patiya Le Ja	Banjaarin(1960 film)	Chand Pardesi	Mukesh (singer) & Lata Mangeshkar	Hindi
Durga / Shuddha Saveri	Ennuyir thozhiye	Kangalal Kaidhu Sei	A. R. Rahman	Unni Menon & Chinmayi	
Gara	Aise To Na Dekho	Teen Devian	S. D. Burman	Mohammed Rafi	Hindi
Gara	Tere Mere Sapne Ab Ek Rang Hain	Guide (film)	S. D. Burman	Mohammed Rafi	Hindi
Gara	Jivan Men Piya Tera Sath Rahe	Goonj Uthi Shehnai	Vasant Desai	Mohammed Rafi & Lata Mangeshkar	Hindi
Gara	Kabhi Khud Pe Kabhi Haalaath Pe Ronaa Aayaa	Hum Dono (1961 film)	Jaidev	Mohammed Rafi	Hindi
Gara	Mohe Panghat Pe Nandalal Ched Gayo Re	Mughal-e-Azam	Naushad	Lata Mangeshkar	Hindi
Gara	Hamsafar Saath Apna Chhod Chale	Aakhri Daao(1958 film)	Madan Mohan (composer)	Mohammed Rafi & Asha Bhosle	Hindi
Gara	Unke Khayal Aye To Ate Chale Gaye	Lal Patthar	Shankar–Jaikishan	Mohammed Rafi	Hindi
Gara	Diwana Kahe Ke Aaj Mujhe Phir Pukariye	Mulzim (1963 film)	Ravi (composer)	Mohammed Rafi	Hindi
Gaud Malhar	Jhir Jhir Barase Savani Ankhiyan	Aashirwad (film)	Vasant Desai	Lata Mangeshkar	Hindi
Gaud Malhar	Garajat Barsat Bheejata Ailo	Malhar(1951 film)	Roshan (music director)	Lata Mangeshkar	Hindi
Gaud Malhar	Jurm-e-Ulfat Pe	Taj Mahal (1963 film)	Roshan (music director)	Lata Mangeshkar	Hindi
Gaud Malhar	Sharabi, Sharabi Ye Savan Ka Mausam	Noor Jehan (film)	Roshan (music director)	Suman Kalyanpur	Hindi
Gaud Sarang	Woh Dekhen To Unki Inayat	Funtoosh	S. D. Burman	Kishore Kumar & Asha Bhosle	Hindi
Gaud Sarang	Leheron Mein Jhoolun	Society(1955 film)	S. D. Burman	Asha Bhosle	Hindi
Gaud Sarang	Jhula Jhulo Re	Ekadashi(1955 film)	Avinash Vyas	Lata Mangeshkar	Hindi
Gaud Sarang	Ritu Aye Ritu Jaye	Hamdard(1953 film)	Anil Biswas (composer)	Manna Dey & Lata Mangeshkar	Hindi
Gaud Sarang	Na Dir Deem	Pardesi (1957 film)	Anil Biswas (composer)	Lata Mangeshkar	Hindi
Gaud Sarang	Kuch Aur Zamana	Chhoti Chhoti Baten	Anil Biswas (composer)	Meena Kapoor	Hindi
Gaud Sarang	Allah Tero Naam	Hum Dono (1961 film)	Jaidev	Lata Mangeshkar & Chorus	Hindi
Gaud Sarang	Dekho Jadu Bhare More Naina	Aasman (1952 film)	O. P. Nayyar	Geeta Dutt	Hindi
Gaud Sarang / Charukesi	Anbey	Rhythm	A. R. Rahman	Sadhana Sargam	
Gaula (raga)	Vedham Nee Iniya Naadham Nee	Koyil Puraa	Ilaiyaraaja	K. J. Yesudas	
Gourimanohari / Patdeep	Megha Chhaye Adhi Rat	Sharmeelee	S. D. Burman	Mohammad Rafi	Hindi
Gourimanohari / Patdeep	Neethan Allaamal Thunai Yaar	Velaikkaari	C. R. Subburaman, S. M. Subbaiah Naidu	K. R. Ramasamy	
Gourimanohari / Patdeep	Aahasakhi Ee Vaname	Uma Chandi Gowri Sankarula Katha	Pendyala (composer)	P. Susheela	Telugu
Gourimanohari / Patdeep	Guruleka Etuvanti	Tyagayya (1981 film)	K. V. Mahadevan	S. P. Balasubrahmanyam	Telugu
Gourimanohari / Patdeep	Paattum Naane Baavamum Naane	Thiruvilaiyadal	K. V. Mahadevan	T. M. Soundararajan	
Gourimanohari / Patdeep	Saaz Ho Tum Avaaz Hun Main	Saaz Aur Awaz(1966 film)	Naushad	Lata Mangeshkar	Hindi
Gourimanohari / Patdeep	Naa Madhi Paadina	Pavitra Hrudayalu	T. Chalapathi Rao	Ghantasala (musician)	Telugu
Gourimanohari / Patdeep	Nee Adugulona adugu vesi	Poola Rangadu (1967 film)	Ghantasala (musician)	Ghantasala (musician) & P. Susheela	Telugu
Gourimanohari & |Kedar (raga) / Hamir Kalyani	Ennuyir Thozhi Keladi Oru Sethi	Karnan	Viswanathan–Ramamoorthy	P. Susheela	
Gourimanohari / Patdeep	Gowri Manohariyai	Makkala Sainya	M. S. Viswanathan	S. P. Balasubrahmanyam & Vani Jairam	
Gourimanohari / Patdeep	Kavithai Arangerum Neram	Andha 7 Naatkal	M. S. Viswanathan	P. Jayachandran & S. Janaki	
Gourimanohari / Patdeep	Malare Kurinji Malare	Dr. Siva	M. S. Viswanathan	S. Janaki & K. J. Yesudas	
Gourimanohari / Patdeep	Adhikaalai Kadhire	Urudhi Mozhi	Ilaiyaraaja	P. Jayachandran & S. Janaki	
Gourimanohari / Patdeep	Anbe Vaa Arugile	Kilipetchu Ketkava	Ilaiyaraaja	S. Janaki & K. J. Yesudas	
Gourimanohari / Patdeep	Bhoopalam Isaikkum	Thooral Ninnu Pochchu	Ilaiyaraaja	Uma Ramanan & K. J. Yesudas	
Gourimanohari / Patdeep	Doorathil Naan Kanda	Nizhalgal	Ilaiyaraaja	S. Janaki	
Gourimanohari / Patdeep	Enthan Vaazhkaiyin Artham	Chinna Kannamma	Ilaiyaraaja	S. Janaki & Mano (singer)	
Gourimanohari / Patdeep	Kanna Varuvaaya	Manathil Uruthi Vendum	Ilaiyaraaja	K. S. Chithra & K. J. Yesudas	
Gourimanohari / Patdeep	Kannan Naalum	Ilamai Kolam	Ilaiyaraaja	S. Janaki	
Gourimanohari / Patdeep	Maanguyile (Traces)	Karagattakaran	Ilaiyaraaja	S. P. Balasubrahmanyam	
Gourimanohari / Patdeep	Muthamizh Kaviye (Occasional N2 trace)	Dharmathin Thalaivan	Ilaiyaraaja	K. S. Chithra & K. J. Yesudas	
Gourimanohari / Patdeep	Ponvaanam	Indru Nee Nalai Naan	Ilaiyaraaja	S. Janaki	
Gourimanohari / Patdeep	Santhana Kaatre "(beautifully transcends to ShankarabharaNam in the third line of the charaNams and goes back to Gowrimanohari)"	Thanikattu Raja	Ilaiyaraaja	S. P. Balasubrahmanyam & S. Janaki	
Gourimanohari / Patdeep	Sola Kiligal Rendu	Koyil Kaalai	Ilaiyaraaja	S. P. Balasubrahmanyam & S. Janaki	
Gourimanohari / Patdeep	Solai Poovil	Vellai Roja	Ilaiyaraaja	S. P. Balasubrahmanyam & S. Janaki	
Gourimanohari / Patdeep	Thaazhampoove Kannurangu	Indru Nee Nalai Naan	Ilaiyaraaja	S. P. Balasubrahmanyam & Uma Ramanan	
Gourimanohari / Patdeep	Thaazhampoove	Kai Kodukkum Kai	Ilaiyaraaja	S. P. Balasubrahmanyam & S. Janaki	
Gourimanohari / Patdeep	Thendralai Kandu Kolla	Nilave Mugam Kaattu	Ilaiyaraaja	Hariharan (singer) & Ilaiyaraaja	
Gourimanohari / Patdeep	Vaarayo Vaanmathi	Pagal Nilavu	Ilaiyaraaja	Usha Srinivasan & Ramesh	
Gourimanohari / Patdeep	Vilakethu Vilakethu	Per Sollum Pillai	Ilaiyaraaja	Malaysia Vasudevan	
Gourimanohari & |Kedar (raga) / Hamir Kalyani	Janani Janani	Thaai Mookaambikai	Ilaiyaraaja	Ilaiyaraaja	
Hameer	"Madhuban Mein Radhika Nache Re"	Kohinoor (1960 film)	Naushad	Mohammed Rafi & Niyaz Ahmed Khan	
Hamsadhvani	Woh Chaand Jahaan Woh Jaaye	Sharada (1957 film)	C. Ramchandra	Lata Mangeshkar & Asha Bhosle	Hindi
Hamsadhvani	Shuklambhara dharam Vishnum sashivarnam Vatapi Ganapathim	Vinayaka Chaviti	Ghantasala (musician)	Ghantasala (musician)	Telugu
Hamsadhvani	Ja Tose Nahin Bolun Kanhaiya	Parivar(1956 film)	Salil Chowdhury	Lata Mangeshkar & Manna Dey	Hindi
Hamsadhvani	Dating / Boys-ai yenga vaikkadhe (Boys)	Boys	A. R. Rahman		
Hamsadhvani	Behti Hawa Sa Tha Voh	3 Idiots	Shantanu Moitra	Shaan	
Hamsadhvani	Sundari Neeyum Sundaran Gnaanum	Michael Madana Kama Rajan	Ilayaraaja	Kamal Haasan & S Janaki	
Hamsadhvani	Mayile Mayile	Kadavul amaiththu vaiththa mEdai	Ilaiyaraja	S.P.Balasubrahmanyam & Jency Anthony	
Hamsadhvani	Phir Se Ud Chala	Rockstar (2011 film)	A. R. Rahman	Mohit Chauhan	
Hamsadhvani	Thee kuruvi	Kangalal Kaidhu Sei	A. R. Rahman		
Hamsadhvani	Vellai Pookal	Kannathil Muthamittal	A. R. Rahman		
Hamsadhvani & Vaasanthi	Manmatha Masam	Paarthale Paravasam	A. R. Rahman	Shankar Mahadevan & Nithyasree Mahadevan	
Hamsadhvani & Sankarabharanam	Ye Jo Des Hai Mera	Swades	A. R. Rahman	A. R. Rahman	
Hamsadhvani	Iruvathu Kodi Nilavugal	Thullatha Manamum Thullum	S. A. Rajkumar	Hariharan	
Hamsadhvani	Teri Mitti me Mil Jawa	Kesari	Arko	B Praak	
Hanumatodi	Athiradee	Shivaji: The Boss	AR Rahman	AR Rahman, Sayonara	Tamil
Hanumatodi	Nagada Nagada	Jab We Met	Pritam Chakraborty	Sonu Nigam, Javed Ali	
Hanumatodi	Johnny Johnny	Entertainment	Sachin-Jigar	Sachin-Jigar, Madhav Krishnan, Priya Panchal	Hindi
Hanumatodi	Nadamaya Ee Lokavella	Jeevana Chaitra	Upendra Kumar	Dr. Rajkumar	Kannada
Hemavati (raga)	Paalinchara Ranga	Vipra Narayana	S. Rajeswara Rao	A. M. Rajah	Telugu
Hindolam / Malkauns	Othaiyadi Pathayila	Kanaa (film)	Dhibu Ninan Thomas	Anirudh Ravichander	Tamil
Hindolam / Malkauns	Aadha Hai Chandrama Raat Aadhi	Navrang	C Ramchandra	Mahendra Kapoor & Asha Bhosle	Hindi
Hindolam / Malkauns	Man Tarpat Hari Darshan ko Aaj	Baiju Bawra (film)	Naushad	Mohammed Rafi	Hindi
Hindolam / Malkauns	Rajasekharaa nee pai moju teera leduraa	Anarkali (1955 film)	P. Adinarayana Rao	Ghantasala (musician) & Jikki	Telugu
Hindolam / Malkauns	"Saamajavaragamana saadhu hruth"	Sankarabharanam (1980 film)	K. V. Mahadevan	S. P. Balasubrahmanyam & S. Janaki	Telugu
Hindolam / Malkauns	Maanava Dehavu	Bhakta Kumbara	G. K. Venkatesh	P. B. Sreenivas	Kannada
Hindolam / Malkauns	Om Namah Shivaya	Salangai Oli	Ilaiyaraaja	S Janaki	
Hindolam / Malkauns	Komuram Bheemudo	Rrr	M M Keeravani	Kaala Bhairava	Telugu
Hindolam / Malkauns	Innisai Alapedaye	Varalaru	A. R. Rahman	Naresh Iyer, Mahathi & Saindhavi	
Hindolam / Malkauns	Margazhi poove	May Madham	A. R. Rahman	Malgudi Subha	
Hindolam / Malkauns	Ek Ladki Thi	Love You Hamesha	A. R. Rahman	Kavita Krishnamurthy	
Hindolam / Malkauns	Magudi Magudi	Kadal	A. R. Rahman	Aryan Dinesh, Chinmayee, Tanvi Shah	
Hindolam / Malkauns	Yakkai Thiri	Aaytha Ezhuthu	A. R. Rahman	A.R.Rahman, Pop Shalini, Tanvi Shah, Sunitha Sarathy	
Hindolam / Malkauns	Natavisharade Natashekara	Malaya Marutha	Vijaya Bhaskar	K. J. Yesudas	Kannada
Huseni	Thottu Thottu Pesum Sultana	Ethirum Pudhirum	Vidyasagar	Pushpavanam Kuppusamy, Swarnalatha	Tamil
Jaijaivanti / Dwijavanthi	Mausam Suhana Dil Hai Deewana(H) / Nee Needalona Nilichenuraa(T)	Suvarna Sundari	P. Adinarayana Rao	Lata Mangeshkar (H) / P. Susheela (T)	Hindi & Telugu
Jaijaivanti / Dwijavanthi	Yeh Dil Ki Lagi Kam Kya Hogi	Mughal-e-Azam	Naushad	Lata Mangeshkar	Hindi
Jaijaivanti / Dwijavanthi	Zindagi Aaj Mere Nam Se Sharamati Hai	Son of India (1962 film)	Naushad	Mohammad Rafi	Hindi
Jaijaivanti / Dwijavanthi	Kanavera Muni Raja	Panduranga Mahatyam	T. V. Raju	P. Leela	Telugu
Jaijaivanti / Dwijavanthi	Manmohana Bade Jhuthe	Seema (1955 film)	Shankar–Jaikishan	Lata Mangeshkar	Hindi
Jaijaivanti / Dwijavanthi	Suni Suni Saaj Ki Sitar Par	Lal Patthar	Shankar–Jaikishan	Kishore Kumar	Hindi
Jaijaivanti / Dwijavanthi	Himagiri Sogasulo	Pandava Vanavasam	Ghantasala (musician)	Ghantasala (musician) & P. Susheela	Telugu
Jaijaivanti / Dwijavanthi	Manasuna Manasai	Doctor Chakravarty	S. Rajeswara Rao	Ghantasala (musician)	Telugu
Jaijaivanti / Dwijavanthi	Vadasi Yadi Kinchidapi Priye Chaaruseele	Bhakta Jayadeva	S. Rajeswara Rao	Ghantasala (musician)	Telugu
Jaijaivanti / Dwijavanthi	Bairan Ho Gai Raina	Dekh Kabira Roya	Madan Mohan	Manna Dey	Hindi
Jaijaivanti / Dwijavanthi	Ee Mooga Choopela	Gaali Medalu	T. G. Lingappa	Ghantasala (musician) & Renuka	Telugu
Jaijaivanti / Dwijavanthi	Aadave andala surabhamini	Yamagola	K. Chakravarthy	S. P. Balasubrahmanyam	Telugu
Jaijaivanti / Dwijavanthi	Bombay Theme	Bombay (film)	A. R. Rahman		Hindi
Jaijaivanti / Dwijavanthi	Andhimanthaarai - Theme 2	Andhimanthaarai	A. R. Rahman		Tamil
Jaijaivanti / Dwijavanthi with shades of Desh	Sathiyam	Kochadaiiyaan	A. R. Rahman	Latha Rajanikanth	Tamil
Jaunpuri	Jaye To Jayen Kahan Samjhe Ga Kaun Yahan	Taxi Driver (1954 film)	S. D. Burman	Lata Mangeshkar	Hindi
Jaunpuri	Dil Ched Koi Aisa Nagma	Inspector (1956 film)	Hemant Kumar	Lata Mangeshkar	Hindi
Jaunpuri	Kalaye Jeevitha Manna (Padyam)	Sri Venkateswara Mahatyam	Pendyala (composer)	P. Susheela	Telugu
Jaunpuri	Yela Naapai Dhaya Choopavu	Vipra Narayana	S. Rajeswara Rao	P. Bhanumathi	Telugu
Jaunpuri	Yechatikoyi Nee Payanam	Amarasilpi Jakkanna	S. Rajeswara Rao	Ghantasala (musician)	Telugu
Jaunpuri	Chitanandan Aage Nachungi	Do Kaliyaan	Ravi (composer)	Asha Bhosle	Hindi
Jaunpuri	Dil Mein Ho Tum Ankhon Me Tum	Satyameva Jayate	Bappi Lahiri	S. Janaki	Hindi
Jaunpuri	Pal pal hai bhari	Swades	A. R. Rahman		
Jhinjhoti	Padamani Nannadaga Thaguna	Doctor Chakravarty	S. Rajeswara Rao	P. Susheela	Telugu
Jog (raga)	Kavidhai Kelungal	Punnagai Mannan	Ilaiyaraaja	Vani Jairam	
Jog (raga)	Metti Oli Kaatrodu	Metti (film)	Ilaiyaraaja	Ilaiyaraaja, S. Janaki	
Jog (raga)	Noor Un Allah	Meenaxi: A Tale of Three Cities	A. R. Rahman		
Jog (raga)	Oru Pattaam Poochi	Kadhalukku Mariyadhai	Ilaiyaraaja	K.J. Yesudas	
Jog (raga)	Pani Vizhum Malarvanam	Ninaivellam Nithya	Ilaiyaraaja	S. P. Balasubrahmanyam	
Jog (raga)	Pramadhavanam Vendum	His Highness Abdullah	Raveendran	K J Yesudas	
Jog (raga)	Peigala Nambaadhe	Mahanadhi	Ilaiyaraaja	Kamal Haasan, Shanmugasundari	
Jog Raga / Tilang Raga / Gambhira Nattai	Dil Se Re	Dil Se..	A. R. Rahman	A. R. Rahman, Anuradha Sriram	
Jog (raga) / Nata (raga)	Narumugaye	Iruvar	A. R. Rahman	P. Unnikrishnan & Bombay Jayashri	
Jog (raga) / Nata (raga) / Chalanata	Chale Chalo	Lagaan	A. R. Rahman	A. R. Rahman	
Jog (raga)	Adhara Marola Adirinadela Mriga Nayanaa	Gautamiputra Satakarni (film)	Chirrantan Bhatt	S. P. Balasubrahmanyam & Shreya Ghoshal	Telugu
Kafi (raga) / Kanada	Alaipayuthey	Alaipayuthey	A. R. Rahman		
Kafi / Miyan Malhar / Pilu	Ghanan ghanana	Lagaan	A. R. Rahman		
Kafi (raga)	Inkem Inkem Inkem Kaavaale	Geetha Govindam	Sid Sriram		
Kalavati	Yeh Tara Woh Tara	Swades	A. R. Rahman	Udit Narayan	
Kalyana Vasantham	Duet Sax piece	Duet	A. R. Rahman	Kadri Gopalnath	
Kanada	Paavana Guna Ramahare	Bhakta Potana	V. Nagayya	V. Nagayya	Telugu
Kanada	Anyuledutanu	Sri Venkateswara Mahatyam	Pendyala (composer)	Puvvula Suri Babu	Telugu
Kanada	Jagadabhi Ramudu Sriraamude	Lava Kusa	Ghantasala (musician)	Ghantasala (musician) & P. Leela & P. Susheela	Telugu
Kanada	Janani Siva Kaamini	Nartanasala (1963 film)	Susarla Dakshinamurthi	P. Susheela	Telugu
Kanada	Jotee Bharati (verse)	Bhakta Potana(1966 film)	S. Rajeswara Rao	Ghantasala (musician)	Telugu
Kanada & Mohanam	Thenmerku	Karuthamma	A. R. Rahman	Unni Krishnan & K. S. Chitra	
Ābhōgi Kanada	Jiya Nahi Laage	Sau Saal Baad	Laxmikant–Pyarelal	Lata Mangeshkar	
Kedar (raga) / Hamir Kalyani	Dharsan Do Ghan Shyam	Narsi Bhagat	Shankar Rao Vyas	Hemant Kumar & Manna Dey & Sudha Malhotra & G.S.Nepali & Ravi	Hindi
Kedar (raga) / Hamir Kalyani	Sridevini	Sri Venkateswara Mahatyam	Pendyala (composer)	S. Varalakshmi	Telugu
Kedar (raga) / Hamir Kalyani	Hum Ko Man Ki Shakti Dena	Guddi (1971 film)	Vasant Desai	Vani Jairam & Chorus	Hindi
Kedar (raga) / Hamir Kalyani	Kannizhantha	Enippadigal	K. V. Mahadevan	P. Susheela	
Kedar (raga) / Hamir Kalyani	Bekas pe karam kijie ye	Mughal-e-Azam	Naushad	Lata Mangeshkar	Hindi
Kedar (raga) / Hamir Kalyani	Main Pagal Mera Manwa Pagal	Ashiana	Madan Mohan	Talat Mahmood	Hindi
Kedar (raga) / Hamir Kalyani	Sadhinchanouna	Rahasyam (1967 film)	Ghantasala (musician)	Ghantasala (musician) & P. Susheela	Telugu
Kedar (raga) / Hamir Kalyani	Nee Madhu Murali gaana leela	Bhakta Jayadeva	S. Rajeswara Rao	Ghantasala (musician)	Telugu
Kedar (raga) / Hamir Kalyani	Aap Yun Hi Agar Humse Milte Rahe	Ek Musafir Ek Hasina	O. P. Nayyar	Asha Bhosle & Mohammed Rafi	Hindi
Kedar (raga) / Hamir Kalyani	Bole To Baansuri	Sawan Ko Aane Do	Raj Kamal	K. J. Yesudas	Hindi
Kedar (raga) / Hamir Kalyani	Vellaikamalathiley	Gowri Kalyanam	M. S. Viswanathan	Soolamangalam Sisters	
Kedar (raga) / Hamir Kalyani	Chandrodayam Oru Pen	Chandhrodhayam	M. S. Viswanathan	T. M. Soundararajan & P. Susheela	
Kedar (raga) / Hamir Kalyani	Lalitha Kalaradhanalo	Kalyani (1979 film)	Ramesh Naidu	S. P. Balasubrahmanyam	Telugu
Kedar (raga) / Hamir Kalyani	Nee oru kadhal	Nayakan	Ilaiyaraaja	K. S. Chithra & Mano (singer)	
Kedar (raga) / Hamir Kalyani	Pillai Pirayathile	Kanavugal Karpanaigal	Gangai Amaran	Deepan Chakravarthy	
Kedar (raga) / Hamir Kalyani	Eriyile Oru Kashmir Roja	Maadhana Maaligai	M. B. Sreenivasan	P. Susheela & K. J. Yesudas	
Kedar (raga) / Hamir Kalyani	Manasukkul Utkarnthu	Kalyana Agathigal	V. S. Narasimham	P. Susheela & Raj Sitaraman	
Kedar (raga) / Hamir Kalyani & Sankarabharanam & Bihag	Nee Than En Desiya Geetham	Paarthale Paravasam	A. R. Rahman	K. S. Chithra & Balram	
Kedar (raga) / Hamir Kalyani	Swasame	Thenali	A. R. Rahman	S. P. Balasubrahmanyam & Sadhana Sargam	
Kedar (raga) / Hamir Kalyani & Saraswati	Kaiyil mithakkum	Ratchagan	A. R. Rahman	Srinivas (singer)	
Kedar (raga) / Hamir Kalyani & Saraswathi & Saranga	Malargale Malargale	Love Birds	A. R. Rahman	Hariharan & K. S. Chitra	
Kedar (raga) / Hamir Kalyani	Nila Kaigirathu	Indira (1995 film)	A. R. Rahman	Hariharan (singer) & Harini (singer)	
Kedar (raga) / Hamir Kalyani	En Swasa Kaatre	En Swasa Kaatre	A. R. Rahman	Unni Menon	
Kedar (raga) / Hamir Kalyani	Porkalam	Thenali	A. R. Rahman		
Kedaram	Ithu oru Ponmalai Pozhuthu	Nizhalgal	Ilaiyaraaja	S P Balasubramaniam	
Kedaram	Ennavale adi ennavale	Kaadhalan	A. R. Rahman	P. Unni Krishnan	
Keeravani / Kirwani	Kunguma Poove	Maragatham	S. M. Subbaiah Naidu	J. P. Chandrababu, K. Jamuna Rani	
Keeravani / Kirwani	Mera Dil Yeh Pukare Aaja	Nagin (1954 film)	Hemant Kumar	Lata Mangeshkar	Hindi
Keeravani / Kirwani	Geet Gata Hun Main Gunagunata Hun Main	Lal Patthar	Shankar–Jaikishan	Kishore Kumar	Hindi
Keeravani / Kirwani	Kahe Jhum Jhum Raat Ye Suhani	Love Marriage (1959 film)	Shankar–Jaikishan	Lata Mangeshkar	Hindi
Keeravani / Kirwani	Yad Na Jaye Bite Dinon	Dil Ek Mandir	Shankar–Jaikishan	Mohammed Rafi	Hindi
Keeravani / Kirwani	Ye Raat Bheegi Bheegi	Chori Chori (1956 film)	Shankar–Jaikishan	Lata Mangeshkar & Manna Dey	Hindi
Keeravani / Kirwani	Ankhon Se Jo Utari	Phir Wohi Dil Laya Hoon	O. P. Nayyar	Asha Bhosle	Hindi
Keeravani / Kirwani	Main Pyar Ka Rahi Hun	Ek Musafir Ek Hasina	O. P. Nayyar	Mohammed Rafi & Asha Bhosle	Hindi
Keeravani / Kirwani	Pukarta Chala Hun Main	Mere Sanam	O. P. Nayyar	Mohammed Rafi	Hindi
Keeravani / Kirwani	Ye Raten Ye Mausam Nadi Ka Kinara	Dilli Ka Thug	Ravi (composer)	Mohammed Rafi	Hindi
Keeravani / Kirwani	Neend Na Mujhko Aye	Post Box No. 999(1958 film)	Kalyanji–Anandji	Hemant Kumar & Lata Mangeshkar	Hindi
Keeravani / Kirwani	Tumhi Mere Mit Ho	Pyase Panchhi(1961 film)	Kalyanji–Anandji	Hemant Kumar & Suman Kalyanpur	Hindi
Keeravani / Kirwani	Beqaraar Dil, Tu Gaye Jaa	Door Ka Raahi	Kishore Kumar	Kishore Kumar & Sulakshana Pandit	Hindi
Keeravani / Kirwani	Oho Endhan Baby	Then Nilavu	A. M. Rajah	A. M. Rajah	
Keeravani / Kirwani	Anewala Pal, Janewala Hai	Gol Maal	R. D. Burman	Kishore Kumar	Hindi
Keeravani / Kirwani	Meri Bhigi-Bhigi Si Palakon Pe Rah Gaye	Anamika (1973 film)	R. D. Burman	Kishore Kumar	Hindi
Keeravani / Kirwani	Ek Radha Ek Meera	Ram Teri Ganga Maili	Ravindra Jain	Lata Mangeshkar	Hindi
Keeravani / Kirwani	Ka Karoon Sajani	Swami (1977 film)	Rajesh Roshan	K. J. Yesudas	Hindi
Keeravani / Kirwani	Chinna Mani Kuyile	Amman Koil Kizhakkaale	Ilaiyaraaja	S. P. Balasubrahmanyam	
Keeravani / Kirwani	Kaatril Endhan Geetham	Johnny	Ilaiyaraaja	S. Janaki	
Keeravani / Kirwani	Kiravani	Padum Paravaigal / Anveshana	Ilaiyaraaja	S. P. Balasubrahmanyam	
Keeravani / Kirwani	Malayoram Veesum Kaathu	Paadu Nilave	Ilaiyaraaja	S. P. Balasubrahmanyam	
Keeravani / Kirwani	Nenjukulle Innaarunnu	Ponnumani	Ilaiyaraaja	S. P. Balasubrahmanyam	
Keeravani / Kirwani	Enai kanavilaye neatrodu	Kadhal Desam	A. R. Rahman	S. P. Balasubrahmanyam, OS Arun, Rafee	
Keeravani / Kirwani	Jillallava	En Swaasa Kaatre	A. R. Rahman		
Keeravani / Kirwani	Vetri Kodi Kattu	Padayappa	A. R. Rahman	S. P. Balasubrahmanyam	
Keeravani / Kirwani	A part of Liberation	127 Hours	A. R. Rahman		
Keeravani / Kirwani	Arima Arima.	Enthiran	A. R. Rahman		
Keeravani / Kirwani	Evano Oruvan	Alaipayuthey	A. R. Rahman		
Keeravani / Kirwani	Mausam & Escape	Slumdog Millionaire	A. R. Rahman		
Keeravani / Kirwani	Neethanae (main melody)	Mersal	A. R. Rahman	A. R. Rahman & Shreya Ghoshal	
Keeravani / Kirwani	Sundari	Kannathil Muthamittal	A. R. Rahman		
Keeravani / Kirwani & Shivaranjani	Al Maddath Maula	Mangal Pandey: The Rising	A. R. Rahman		
Keeravani / Kirwani	En Nadanam	Thamizh Padam 2	Kannan	Sharreth & Vijay Prakash	
Keeravani / Kirwani	Azhagai Pookuthe	Ninathale Inikkum	Vijay Antony	Prasanna, Janaki Iyer	
Keeravani/Natabhairavi	Vennilavu Saaral Nee	Amaran (2024 film)			
Khamaj / Harikambhoji	Srivalli	Pushpa: The Rise	Devi Sri Prasad	Sid Sriram	Telugu
Khamaj / Harikambhoji	Srivalli	Pushpa: The Rise	Devi Sri Prasad	Javed Ali	Hindi
Khamaj / Harikambhoji	Vo Na Ayenge Palatkar	Devdas (1955 film)	S. D. Burman	Mubarak Begum	Hindi
Khamaj / Harikambhoji	Piya Tose Naina Lage Re	Guide (film)	S. D. Burman	Lata Mangeshkar	Hindi
Khamaj / Harikambhoji	Nazar Lagi Raja Tore Bungle Par	Kala Pani (1958 film)	S. D. Burman	Asha Bhosle	Hindi
Khamaj / Harikambhoji	Deewana Mastana Hua Dil Jaan e Jahan	Bombai Ka Babu	S. D. Burman	Mohammed Rafi & Asha Bhosle	Hindi
Khamaj / Harikambhoji	Ham Apna Unhe Bana Na Sake	Bhanwara	Khemchand Prakash	K. L. Saigal	Hindi
Khamaj / Harikambhoji	Sajana Saanjh Bhayi	Roti (1942 film)	Anil Biswas (composer)	Begum Akhtar	Hindi
Khamaj / Harikambhoji	Ab Kya Misal Dun	Aarti (film)	Roshan (music director)	Mohammed Rafi	Hindi
Khamaj / Harikambhoji	Tere Bina Sajna Lage Na Jiya Hamar	Aarti (film)	Roshan (music director)	Mohammed Rafi & Lata Mangeshkar	Hindi
Khamaj / Harikambhoji	Bata Do Koi Kaun Gali Gaye Shyam	Madhu (1959 film)	Roshan (music director)	Mohammed Rafi M & Lata Mangeshkar F	Hindi
Khamaj / Harikambhoji	A Dil Se Dil Mila Le	Navrang	C. Ramchandra	Asha Bhosle	Hindi
Khamaj / Harikambhoji	Dhal Chuki Sham-e-Gham	Kohinoor (1960 film)	Naushad	Mohammed Rafi	Hindi
Khamaj / Harikambhoji	Chunariya Katati Jae	Mother India	Naushad	Mohammed Rafi & Lata Mangeshkar & Shamshad Begum	Hindi
Khamaj / Harikambhoji	Mere To Giridhara Gopala	Meera (1979 film)	Ravi Shankar	Vani Jairam & Dinkar Kamanna	Hindi
Khamaj / Harikambhoji	Sakhi Re Suun Bole Papiha	Miss Mary (1957 film)	Hemant Kumar	Lata Mangeshkar & Asha Bhosle	Hindi
Khamaj / Harikambhoji	Jao Re jogi tum jao re	Amrapali (film)	Shankar–Jaikishan	Lata Mangeshkar	Hindi
Khamaj / Harikambhoji	O Sajna Barakha Bahara Ayi	Parakh (1960 film)	Salil Chowdhury	Lata Mangeshkar	Hindi
Khamaj / Harikambhoji	Ayo Kahan Se Ghanashyam	Buddha Mil Gaya	R. D. Burman	Manna Dey & Archana Mahanta	Hindi
Khamaj / Harikambhoji	Bada Natkhat Hai Re Krishna Kanhaiya	Amar Prem	R. D. Burman	Lata Mangeshkar	Hindi
Khamaj / Harikambhoji	Kuch To Log Kahenge	Amar Prem	R. D. Burman	Kishore Kumar	Hindi
Khamaj / Harikambhoji	Sham Dhale Jamuna Kinare	Pushpanjali (1970 film)	Laxmikant–Pyarelal	Lata Mangeshkar & Manna Dey	Hindi
Khamaj / Harikambhoji	Khat Likh De Savariya Ke Naam Babu	Aaye Din Bahar Ke	Laxmikant–Pyarelal	Asha Bhosle	Hindi
Khamaj / Harikambhoji	Aathangara Marame	Kizhakku Cheemayile	A. R. Rahman	Mano, Sujatha Mohan	
Khamaj / Harikambhoji	Adi Nenthikkitten	Star	A. R. Rahman	Karthik, Chitra Sivaraman	
Khamaj / Harikambhoji	Kannukku Mai Azhagu	Pudhiya Mugam	A. R. Rahman	Unni Menon, P. Susheela	
Khamaj / Harikambhoji	Nenje Nenje	Ratchagan	A. R. Rahman	K. J. Yesudas, Sadhana Sargam	
Khamaj / Harikambhoji	Uyire Uyire	Bombay	A. R. Rahman	Hariharan, K.S. Chitra	
Khamaj / Harikambhoji	Maya Machindra	Indian	A. R. Rahman	S. P. Balasubrahmanyam, Swarnalatha	
Khamaj / Harikambhoji	Chinna chinna aasai / Dil hai chhotasa	Roja	A. R. Rahman	Minmini	
Khamaj / Harikambhoji	En kadhale	Duet	A. R. Rahman	S. P. Balasubrahmanyam	
Khamaj / Harikambhoji	Kannukku Mai Azhagu	Pudhiya Mugam	A. R. Rahman	Unni Menon | P. Susheela	
Khamaj / Harikambhoji	Nenthukitten	Star	A. R. Rahman		
Khamaj / Harikambhoji	Chinna Chinna Aasai	Roja	A. R. Rahman	Minmini	
Khamaj / Harikambhoji & Brindavani Sarang	Konjum Mainakale	Kandukondein Kandukondein	A.R. Rahman	Sadhana Sargam	
Khamas	Bhangari Marori	Water(film)	A. R. Rahman		
Khamas	Pallaviye Charanam	Oruvar Vaazhum Aalayam	Ilaiyaraaja	S. P. Balasubrahmanyam& S. Janaki	
Khamas	Uyirum Neeye	Pavithra	A. R. Rahman	P. Unnikrishnan	
Khamas & Sankarabharanam	Nenje nenje	Ratchagan	A. R. Rahman	Sadhana Sargam & K.J. Yesudas	
Kharaharapriya	Kilimanjaro	Enthiran	A. R. Rahman		
Kharaharapriya	kadhale kadhale	96 (film)	Chinmayi Sripaada		
Kharaharapriya	Poo Malarndhida	Tik Tik Tik	Ilaiyaraaja	K. J. Yesudas, Jency Anthony	
Kharaharapriya	Aaradhisuve Madanaari	Babruvahana	T. G. Lingappa	Dr. Rajkumar	Kannada
Kuntalavarali	Vaadi Sathukudi	Pudhiya Mannargal	A. R. Rahman		
Kuntalavarali	Oru Murai Vanthu	Manichitrathazhu	M. G. Radhakrishnan	K. J. Yesudas, K. S. Chithra	Malayalam
Lalit	Ek Shahenshah Ne Banvaa Ke Hasin Tajmahal	Leader (1964 film)	Naushad	Mohammed Rafi & Lata Mangeshkar	Hindi
Lalit	Pritam Daras Dikhao	Chacha Zindabad(1959 film)	Madan Mohan (composer)	Manna Dey & Lata Mangeshkar	Hindi
Lalit	Tu Hai Mera Prem Devta	Kalpana (1960 film)	O. P. Nayyar	Manna Dey & Mohammed Rafi	Hindi
Lalit	Badi Dheere Jali	Ishqiya	Vishal Bhardwaj	Rekha Bhardwaj	Hindi
Mānji / Bhairavi	Radhimaa	iSaiAbhyankkar (The Indie Isai Album)	Sai Abhayankkar	Sai Abhayankkar, Sai Smriti	Tamil
Maand	Ab To Hai Tumse Har Khushi Apni	Abhimaan (1973 film)	S. D. Burman	Lata Mangeshkar	Hindi
Maand	Tu Chanda Main Chandani	Reshma Aur Shera	Jaidev	Lata Mangeshkar	Hindi
Maand	Bachpan Ki Mohabbat Ko Dil Se Na Judaa Karna	Baiju Bawra (film)	Naushad	Lata Mangeshkar	Hindi
Maand	Jo Me Jaanthi Bisarat	Shabaab (film)	Naushad	Lata Mangeshkar	Hindi
Maand	Nee Daana nannadiraa	Jayabheri	Pendyala (composer)	Ghantasala (musician)	Telugu
Maand	Kesariya Balma	Lekin...	Hridaynath Mangeshkar	Lata Mangeshkar	Hindi
Maand	Anjali anjali	Duet	A. R. Rahman	S. P. Balasubrahmanyam & K.S. Chitra	Tamil
Maand	Piya haji ali	Fiza	A. R. Rahman	A. R. Rahman	Hindi
Maand	Aye Mr. Minor	Kaaviya Thalaivan (2014 film)	A. R. Rahman	A. R. Rahman	Tamil
Maand / Hemant	Sowkkiyama	Sangamam	A. R. Rahman	Nithyashree	Tamil
Maand / Natabhairavi	Kannamma (both main & acapella versions)	Kaala	Santhosh Narayanan	Dhee, Pradeep Kumar	Tamil
Madhuvanti	En Ulil Engo	Rosaappo Ravikkai Kaari	Ilaiyaraaja	Vani Jairam	Tamil
Madhuvanti	Enakkena Erkanave	Parththen Rasiththen	Bharadwaj	Unni Krishnan & Harini	Tamil
Madhuvanti	Kanaa Kaanum Kaalangal	7G Rainbow Colony	Yuvan Shankar Raja	Ustad Sultan Khan, Harish Raghavendra & Madhumitha	Tamil
Madhuvanti	Rasm-e-Ulfat	Dil Ki Rahen	Madan Mohan	Lata Mangeshkar	Hindi
Madhuvanti	Vaada Bin Lada	Mankatha	Yuvan Shankar Raja	Krish & Suchitra	Tamil
Madhuvanti	Vaanaviley	Ramanaa	Ilaiyaraaja	Hariharan & Sadhana Sargam	Tamil
Madhuvanti	Anuraga Enaitu	Nee Nanna Gellalare	Ilaiyaraaja	Dr. Rajkumar	Kannada
Madhukauns	"Uhalu Gusagusalade"	Bandipotu (1963 film)	Ghantasala (musician)	Ghantasala (musician) & P. Susheela	Telugu
Mahati, Bhairavi	Adhisaya Raagam	Aboorva Raagangal	M S Viswanathan	K. J. Yesudas	Tamil
Malayamarutham	Sharade Dayathoride	Malaya Marutha	Vijaya Bhaskar	K. J. Yesudas	Kannada
Malayamarutham	Malaya Marutha Gana	Malaya Marutha	Vijaya Bhaskar	K. J. Yesudas	Kannada
Marva (raga)	"Himagiri Mandira Girija Sundara Karuna Saagara"	Sati Anasuya (1971 film)	P. Adinarayana Rao	P. Susheela	Telugu
Marva (raga)	Payeliya Banvari	Saaz Aur Awaaz(1966 film)	Naushad	Lata Mangeshkar	Hindi
Mayamalavagowla	Kallellam Manikka	Aalayamani	M.S.Viswanathan	T. M. Soundararajan & P.Susheela	
Mayamalavagowla	Kural	Connections (album)	A. R. Rahman		
Mayamalavagowla	Oh Nanba	Lingaa	A. R. Rahman	S. P. Balasubrahmanyam	
Mayamalavagowla	Sollayo Solaikili	Alli Arjuna	A. R. Rahman		
Malhar,"Miyan ki Malhar"	Khwaja Mere Khwaja	Jodhaa Akbar	A. R. Rahman	A. R. Rahman	Hindi
Megh / Madhyamavati	"Shree SitaRamula Kalyanamu Chootamu Raarandi"	Sita Rama Kalyanam (1961 film)	Gali Penchala Narasimha Rao	P. Susheela	Telugu
Megh / Madhyamavati	Kahan Se Aye Badra	Chashme Buddoor (1981 film)	Raj Kamal	K. J. Yesudas & Haimanti Sukla	Hindi
Megh / Madhyamavati	Ye Muthu paapa	Vandicholai Chinraasu	A. R. Rahman	Swarnalatha & Malgudi Subha	
Megh / Madhyamavati / Megh Malhar	Thom karuvil irundom	Star	A. R. Rahman	Shankar Mahadevan	
Megh / Madhyamavati and Shuddha Dhanyasi	Irumbile	Enthiran	A. R. Rahman	Kash n Krissy	
Megh / Madhyamavati	Columbus	Jeans	A. R. Rahman	Sonu Nigam / A. R. Rahman	
Megh / Madhyamavati	Guruvara Banthamma	Bhagyavantha	T. G. Lingappa	Dr. Rajkumar	Kannada
Megh Malhar / Madhyamavati	"Meha aao re Ghir Ghir Ke Chaon re"	Sangeet Samrat Tansen	S. N. Tripathi	Lata Mangeshkar & Manna Dey & Asha Bhosle	Hindi
Megh Malhar / Madhyamavati	Deem tadare dani	Thakshak	A. R. Rahman	Surjo Bhattacharya	
Megh Malhar & Kafi	Velli malare	Jodi	A. R. Rahman	S. P. Balasubrahmanyam & Mahalakshmi Iyer	
Miyan ki Malhar	Nach Mere Mora Zara Nach	Tere Dwar Khada Bhagwan(1964 film)	Shanti Kumar Desai	Manna Dey	Hindi
Miyan ki Malhar	Na Na Na Baraso Baadal	Samrat Prithviraj Chauhan(1959 film)	Vasant Desai	Lata Mangeshkar	Hindi
Miyan ki Malhar	Karo Sab Nichhavar	Ladki Sahyadri Ki	Vasant Desai	Asha Bhosle	Hindi
Miyan ki Malhar	Bole Re Papihara	Guddi (1971 film)	Vasant Desai	Vani Jairam	Hindi
Miyan ki Malhar	Bhaye Bhanjana	Basant Bahar (film)	Shankar–Jaikishan	Manna Dey	Hindi
Miyan ki Malhar	Nacha Re Mayura	Kathputli	Shankar–Jaikishan	Lata Mangeshkar	Hindi
Miyan ki Malhar	Baadal Ghumad Bhar Aaye	Saaz (film)	Bhupen Hazarika & Yashwant Deo & Raj Kamal & Zakir Hussain (musician)	Suresh Wadkar I M & Kavita KrishnamurtiII F	Hindi
Mohanam / Bhoopali	Chanda Hai Tu, Mera Suraj Hai Tu	Aradhana (1969 film)	S. D. Burman	Lata Mangeshkar	Hindi
Mohanam / Bhoopali	Giridhar Gopala	Meera (1945 film)	S. V. Venkatraman	M. S. Subbulakshmi	Tamil
Mohanam / Bhoopali	Jyoti Kalash Chalke	Bhabhi Ki Chudiyan	Sudhir Phadke	Lata Mangeshkar	Hindi
Mohanam / Bhoopali	Lahiri Lahiri Lahirilo	Mayabazaar	Ghantasala	Ghantasala	Telugu
Mohanam / Bhoopali	Nil Gagan Ki Chhaonmen	Amrapali (film)	Shankar–Jaikishan	Lata Mangeshkar	Hindi
Mohanam / Bhoopali	Panchhi Banu Udti Firun Mast Gagan Men	Chori Chori (1956 film)	Shankar–Jaikishan	Lata Mangeshkar	Hindi
Mohanam / Bhoopali	Sayonara, Sayonara	Love in Tokyo	Shankar–Jaikishan	Lata Mangeshkar	Hindi
Mohanam / Bhoopali	Pankh Hote To Ud Ati	Sehra (film)	Ramlal Hirapanna Chowdhury	Lata Mangeshkar	Hindi
Mohanam / Bhoopali	Dil Hun Hun Kare	Rudaali	Bhupen Hazarika	Bhupen Hazarika	Hindi
Mohanam / Bhoopali	Sansaar Ki Har Shay Ka	Dhund (1973 film)	Ravi (composer)	Mahendra Kapoor	Hindi
Mohanam / Bhoopali	Yeh Hava Yeh Phiza	Gumrah (1963 film)	Ravi (composer)	Mahendra Kapoor	Hindi
Mohanam / Bhoopali	In Ankhon Ki Masti Ke Mastane Hazaron Hai	Umrao Jaan (1981 film)	Mohammed Zahur Khayyam	Asha Bhosle	Hindi
Mohanam / Bhoopali	Kanchi Re Kanchi Re	Haré Rama Haré Krishna	R. D. Burman	Lata Mangeshkar & Kishore Kumar	Hindi
Mohanam / Bhoopali	Jaun Tore Charan Kamal Par Vari	Sur Sangam	Laxmikant–Pyarelal	Rajan Mishra of Rajan and Sajan Mishra	Hindi
Mohanam / Bhoopali	Dekha Ek Khvab To Yeh Silsile Hue	Silsila (1981 film)	Shiv–Hari	Lata Mangeshkar && Kishore Kumar	Hindi
Mohanam / Bhoopali	Ham Tum Se Na Kuchh Kah Paaye	Ziddi (1997 film)	Dilip Sen-Sameer Sen	Hariharan (singer)	Hindi
Mohanam / Bhoopali	Paarkaathe Paarkaathe	Gentleman	A. R. Rahman	Minmini, Srinivas & Noel James	
Mohanam / Bhoopali	Boom Boom	Boys	A. R. Rahman		
Mohanam / Bhoopali	Ennodu Nee Irundhal	I (film)	A. R. Rahman	Sid Sriram	
Mohanam / Bhoopali	Himalaya	Connections (album)	A. R. Rahman		
Mohanam / Bhoopali	Paarkathe Paarkathe	Gentleman	A. R. Rahman	Minmini & Chorus	
Mohanam / Bhoopali	Porale Ponnuthayee - Duet Version (Sad)	Karuthamma	A. R. Rahman		
Mohanam / Bhoopali	Samba Samba	Love Birds	A. R. Rahman		
Mohanam / Bhoopali	Mouliyil Mayilpeeli Chaarthi	Nandanam	Raveendran	K S Chitra	
Mohanam / Bhoopali	Ae Dil Kisi ki Yaad Mein	Ik Tera Sahara	Master Inayat Hussain	Saleem Raza	
Mohanam / Bhoopali	Aap Jaisa Koi Meri Zindagi Mein	Qurbani	Biddu Appaiah	Nazia Hassan	
Mohanam / Bhoopali	Ee Hasiru Siriyali	Nagamandala	C. Ashwath	Sangeetha Katti	Kannada
Mohanam / Bhoopali	Navaduva Nudiye	Gandhada Gudi	Rajan–Nagendra	P. B. Sreenivas, S. Janaki	Kannada
Mohanam / Bhoopali	Jenina Holeyo Haalina Maleyo	Chalisuva Modagalu	Rajan–Nagendra	Dr. Rajkumar	Kannada
Mohanam / Bhoopali	Baanallu Neene	Bayalu Dari	Rajan–Nagendra	S. Janaki	Kannada
Maru Bihag / Hemant / Gawati	Kariye naa	Taal	A. R. Rahman	Sukhvinder Singh & Alka Yagnik	
Mishr Desh	Jo Afsaane	Earth (1998 film)	A. R. Rahman	Srinivas (singer)	
Mishra Bhairavi	Jiya jale	Dil Se..	A. R. Rahman	Lata Mangeshkar	
Mishra Kafi (raga)	Aayo sakhi	Water (2005 film)	A. R. Rahman		
Mishra Kalingada / Kalingara	Vega rara	Sri Venkateswara Mahatyam	Pendyala (composer)	Madhavapeddi Satyam	Telugu
Mishra Kedar, Hamir kalyani	Nilakaigiradhu	Indira	A. R. Rahman	Hariharan / Harini	
Mishra Keeravani	Boondon se baatein	Thakshak	A. R. Rahman	Sujata Trivedi	
Mishra Keeravani	Yennasolla pogirai	Kandukondain Kandukondain	A. R. Rahman	Shankar Mahadevan	
Mishra Pahadi (raga)	Shyam rang	Water(film)	A. R. Rahman		
Mishra Patdeep	Chhodo mori bainyan	Zubeidaa	A. R. Rahman	Richa Sharma	
Mishra Pilu	Main vaari vaari	Mangal Pandey: The Rising	A. R. Rahman		
Mishra Pilu	Bol sajani	Doli Saja Ke Rakhna	A. R. Rahman		
Mishra Pilu ./ Kapi (raga)	Oru poyyaavathu sol kanne	Jodi	A. R. Rahman	Hariharan	
Mishra Shyam Kalyan / Hamir Kalyani	Swasame	Thenali	A. R. Rahman	S. P. Balasubrahmanyam & Sadhana Sargam	
Mix of Sindhu Bhairavi (raga) & Latangi & Keeravani	Enge enadu kavithai	Kandukondain Kandukondain	A. R. Rahman	K. S. Chitra	
Mukhari	Pavazha Malli	iSaiAbhayankkar (The Indie Isai Album)	Sai Abhayankkar	Sai Abhayankkar, Shruti Hassan	
Mukhari / Hamir Kalyani	Kannukkul Potthi Vaippen	Thirumanam Enum Nikkah	Ghibran	Vijay Prakash, Charulatha Mani, Sadhana Sargam, R. Ganesh	
Nalinakanthi	Endhal Nenjil Neengatha	Kalaignan	Ilaiyaraaja	K.J. Yesudas	
Nalinakanthi	Manam Virumbuthe	Nerukku Ner	Deva (composer)	P.Unnikrishnan & Harini	
Nalinakanthi	Sonnallum	Kadhal Virus	A. R. Rahman		
Nalinakanthi, Kathanakuthuhalam	Kandukondain Kandukondain	Kandukondain Kandukondain	A. R. Rahman	Hariharan & Mahalakshmi Iyer	
Nalinakanthi	Engirudhu Vandhaayadaa	Fivestar	Sriram Parasuram, Anuradha Sriram	Chandana Bala	
Nata (raga)	Oorellam Unnai Kandu	Nanbenda	Harris Jayaraj	Unnikrishnan & Bombay Jayashree	
Nata (raga)	Chennai Senthamizh	M. Kumaran son of Mahalakshmi	Srikanth Deva	Harish Raghavendra	
Nattakurinji & Khamas (raga)	Oru Naal Oru Polzuthu	Andhimanthaarai	A. R. Rahman	Swarnalatha	
Naatakurunji	Orunaal Orupozhudhu	Anthimandharai	A. R. Rahman		
Naatakurunji	Premika Ne Pyar Se	Humse hai muqabla	A. R. Rahman		
Naatakurunji / Sahana / Rageshree	Kannamochi Yenada	Kandukondain Kandukondain	A. R. Rahman	Saindhavi, Palghat Sriram, Prasanna	
Neelambari, Kedar	Thirakkaatha	En Swasa Kaatre	A. R. Rahman	P. Unnikrishnan & K. S. Chitra	
Nāyaki	Varanam Aayiram	Keladi Kanmani	Ilaiyaraaja	S. Janaki	
Pahadi	"Sakhi Kaun Gali Gayo Shyam"	Pakeezah	Ghulam Mohammed	Parveen Sultana	Hindi
Pahadi	"Chalo Dildar Chalo"	Pakeezah	Ghulam Mohammed	Lata Mangeshkar & Mohammed Rafi	Hindi
Pahadi	"Aaj Ki Raat Piya Dil Na Todo"	Baazi (1951 film)	S. D. Burman	Geeta Dutt	Hindi
Pahadi	"Dil Pukare Are Are"	Jewel Thief	S. D. Burman	Mohammed Rafi & Lata Mangeshkar	Hindi
Pahadi	"Kora Kagaz Tha Man Mera"	Aradhana (1969 film)	S. D. Burman	Lata Mangeshkar & Kishore Kumar	Hindi
Pahadi	"Rula Ke Gaya Sapna Mera"	Jewel Thief	S. D. Burman	Lata Mangeshkar	Hindi
Pahadi	"Wahan Kaun Hai Tera"	Guide (film)	S. D. Burman	Guide (film)	Hindi
Pahadi	"Sajan Ki Galiyan Chod Chale"	Bazaar (1949 film)	Shyam Sundar Gaba	Lata Mangeshkar	Hindi
Pahadi	"Chiru chiru nagavula"	Sri Venkateswara Mahatyam	Pendyala (composer)	SanthaKumari & Swarnalatha	Telugu
Pahadi	"Kabhi To Milegi"	Aarti (film)	Roshan (music director)	Lata Mangeshkar	Hindi
Pahadi	"Jo Vada Kiya Vo"	Taj Mahal (1963 film)	Roshan (music director)	Lata Mangeshkar & Mohammed Rafi	Hindi
Pahadi	"Rahe Na Rahe Ham Mahaka Karenge"	Mamta (1966 film)	Roshan (music director)	Lata Mangeshkar	Hindi
Pahadi	"Sakhi Re Mera Man Uljhe Tan Dole"	Chitralekha (1964 film)	Roshan (music director)	Lata Mangeshkar	Hindi
Pahadi	"Usko Nahin Dekha Hamne Kabhi"	Daadi Maa	Roshan (music director)	Manna Dey & Mahendra Kapoor	Hindi
Pahadi	"Chal Ud Ja Re Panchi"	Bhabhi (1957 film)	Chitragupt (composer)	Mohammed Rafi	Hindi
Pahadi	"Do Dil Dhadak Rahe Hain Aur Avaz Ek Hai"	Insaf (1956 film)	Chitragupt (composer)	Talat Mahmood & Asha Bhosle	Hindi
Pahadi	"Muft Huye Badnam Kisi Se Haay"	Baraat (1960 film)	Chitragupt (composer)	Mukesh (singer)	Hindi
Pahadi	"Are Ja Re Hato Natakhat"	Navrang	C. Ramchandra	C. Ramchandra & Mahendra Kapoor & Asha Bhosle	Hindi
Pahadi	"Gaya Andhera Hua Ujala"	Subah Ka Tara	C. Ramchandra	Lata Mangeshkar & Talat Mahmood	Hindi
Pahadi	"Sham Dhale Khidaki Tale"	Albela (1951 film)	C. Ramchandra	C. Ramchandra & Lata Mangeshkar	Hindi
Pahadi	"Ye Dil Aur Unki"	Prem Parbat	Jaidev	Lata Mangeshkar	Hindi
Pahadi	"Aaj Ki Raat Mere Dil Ki Salami Le Le"	Ram Aur Shyam	Naushad	Mohammed Rafi	Hindi
Pahadi	"Awaz De Kahan Hain"	Anmol Ghadi	Naushad	Noor Jehan & Surendra (actor)	Hindi
Pahadi	"Dil Todnewale"	Son of India (1962 film)	Naushad	Mohammed Rafi & Lata Mangeshkar	Hindi
Pahadi	"Do Sitaron Ka Zamin Pe Hai Milan Aaj Ki Rat"	Kohinoor (1960 film)	Naushad	Mohammed Rafi & Lata Mangeshkar	Hindi
Pahadi	"Javaan Hai Muhabbat"	Anmol Ghadi	Naushad	Noor Jehan	Hindi
Pahadi	"Koi Pyara Ki Dekhe Jadugari"	Kohinoor (1960 film)	Naushad	Lata Mangeshkar & Mohammed Rafi	Hindi
Pahadi	"Suhani Raat Dhal Chuki"	Dulari (film)	Naushad	Mohammed Rafi	Hindi
Pahadi	"Tasvir Banaata Hun"	Baradari(1955 film)	Naushad	Talat Mahmood	Hindi
Pahadi	"Tere Nainon Ne Chori Kiya"	Pyar Ki Jeet (1948 film)	Naushad	Suraiya	Hindi
Pahadi	"Tod Diya Dil Mera Tune Ai Bewafa"	Andaz (1949 film)	Naushad	Lata Mangeshkar	Hindi
Pahadi	"Tora Man Bada Papi Sanvariya Re"	Gunga Jumna	Naushad	Asha Bhosle	Hindi
Pahadi	"Tum Apna Ranj Voh Gam"	Shagun(1964 film)	Husnlal Bhagatram & Sardul Singh Kwatra	Jagjit Kaur	Hindi
Pahadi	"Sun Ri Sakhi Mohe Sajna"	Nagin (1954 film)	Hemant Kumar	Lata Mangeshkar & Chorus	Hindi
Pahadi	"Vrindavan Ka "	Miss Mary (1957 film)	Hemant Kumar	Lata Mangeshkar & Mohammed Rafi	Hindi
Pahadi	"Nee Charana Kamalaana"	Sri Krishnavataram	T. V. Raju	Ghantasala (musician) & P. Leela & P. Susheela	Telugu
Pahadi	"Avuna Nijamena"	Malliswari (1951 film)	S. Rajeswara Rao	Ghantasala (musician) & P. Bhanumathi	Telugu
Pahadi	"Mere Ankhon Mein Bas Gaya Koi Re"	Barsaat (1949 film)	Shankar–Jaikishan	Lata Mangeshkar	Hindi
Pahadi	"Yeh Barkha Bahar"	Mayurpankh	Shankar–Jaikishan	Lata Mangeshkar & Asha Bhosle	Hindi
Pahadi	"Do Dil Tute Do Dil Hare"	Heer Raanjha	Madan Mohan (composer)	Lata Mangeshkar	Hindi
Pahadi	"Lag Jaa Gale"	Woh Kaun Thi?	Madan Mohan (composer)	Lata Mangeshkar	Hindi
Pahadi	"Mori Atariya Pe Kagan Bole"	Aankhen (1950 film)	Madan Mohan (composer)	Meena Kapoor	Hindi
Pahadi	"Do Dil Tute Do Dil Hare"	Mere Sanam	O. P. Nayyar	Mohammed Rafi & Asha Bhosle	Hindi
Pahadi	"Isharon Isharon Mein Dil Lenewale"	Kashmir Ki Kali	O. P. Nayyar	Mohammed Rafi & Asha Bhosle	Hindi
Pahadi	"Thukade Hain Mere Dil Ke"	Mere Sanam	O. P. Nayyar	Mohammed Rafi	Hindi
Pahadi	"Aage Bhi Jaane Na Tu"	Waqt (1965 film)	Ravi (composer)	Asha Bhosle	Hindi
Pahadi	"Aaja Raja Leke Barat Aaja"	Anmol Moti	Ravi (composer)	Asha Bhosle	Hindi
Pahadi	"Aaja Re Tujhko Mera Pyar Pukare"	Gumrah (1963 film)	Ravi (composer)	Mahendra Kapoor	Hindi
Pahadi	"Chaudavin Ka Chand Ho Ya Aftab Ho"	Chaudhvin Ka Chand	Ravi (composer)	Mohammed Rafi	Hindi
Pahadi	"Din Hai Bahar Ke Tere Mere"	Waqt (1965 film)	Ravi (composer)	Mahendra Kapoor & Asha Bhosle	Hindi
Pahadi	"Ham Jab Simata Ke Aapki Bahonmen"	Waqt (1965 film)	Ravi (composer)	Mahendra Kapoor & Asha Bhosle	Hindi
Pahadi	"Kaun Aya Ke Nigahon Mein Chamak Jag Uthi"	Waqt (1965 film)	Ravi (composer)	Asha Bhosle	Hindi
Pahadi	"Sare Jahanse Achcha"	Apna Ghar (1960 film)	Ravi (composer)	Sona Thakur	Hindi
Pahadi	"Tujhko Pukare Mera Pyar"	Neel Kamal (1968 film)	Ravi (composer)	Mohammed Rafi	Hindi
Pahadi	"Voh Dil Kahan Se Lavun"	Bharosa	Ravi (composer)	Lata Mangeshkar	Hindi
Pahadi	"Voh Dil Kahan Se Lavun"	Aadmi Aur Insaan	Ravi (composer)	Mahendra Kapoor & s Balbir & Joginder Singh Luthra	Hindi
Pahadi	"Ye Vadiyan Phizaen Bula Rahi Hain"	Aaj Aur Kal (1963 film)	Ravi (composer)	Mohammed Rafi	Hindi
Pahadi	"Zara Sun Hasina"	Kaun Apna Kaun Paraya	Ravi (composer)	Mohammed Rafi	Hindi
Pahadi	"Aaja Re Aaja Re Voh Mere Dilvar Aaja"	Noorie	Mohammed Zahur Khayyam	Lata Mangeshkar & Nitin Mukesh	Hindi
Pahadi	"Baharon Mera Jivan Bhi Sanvaro"	Aakhri Khat	Mohammed Zahur Khayyam	Lata Mangeshkar	Hindi
Pahadi	"Chori Chori Koi Ae"	Noorie	Mohammed Zahur Khayyam	Lata Mangeshkar	Hindi
Pahadi	"Jaane Kya Dhundti Rahati Hain"	Shola Aur Shabnam (1961 film)	Mohammed Zahur Khayyam	Mohammed Rafi	Hindi
Pahadi	"Kabhi Kabhi Mere Dil Men"	Kabhi Kabhie	Mohammed Zahur Khayyam	Mukesh (singer) & Lata Mangeshkar	Hindi
Pahadi	"Jaane Kya Dhundti Rahati Hain"	Door Ka Raahi	Kishore Kumar	Kishore Kumar & Chorus	Hindi
Pahadi	"Karavate Badalte Rahe Sari Raat Ham"	Aap Ki Kasam	R. D. Burman	Lata Mangeshkar & Kishore Kumar	Hindi
Pahadi	"Karavate Badalte Rahe Sari Raat Ham"	Jurmana (1979 film)	R. D. Burman	Lata Mangeshkar	Hindi
Pahadi	"Awaz Mein Na Dunga"	Dosti (1964 film)	Laxmikant–Pyarelal	Mohammed Rafi	Hindi
Pahadi	"Gudiya Hamse Ruthi Rahogi"	Dosti (1964 film)	Laxmikant–Pyarelal	Lata Mangeshkar	Hindi
Pahadi	"Jaanewalon Zara Mud Ke Dekho Mujhe"	Dosti (1964 film)	Laxmikant–Pyarelal	Mohammed Rafi	Hindi
Pahadi	"Salamat Raho"	Parasmani	Laxmikant–Pyarelal	Mohammed Rafi	Hindi
Pahadi	"Savan Ka Mahina"	Milan (1967 film)	Laxmikant–Pyarelal	Lata Mangeshkar & Mukesh (singer)	Hindi
Pahadi	"Kaise Jiyunga Main Ho"	Sahibaan	Shiv–Hari	Anuradha Paudwal & Jolly Mukherjee	Hindi
Pahadi	"Kaise Jiyunga Main Ho"	Didi(1959 film)	Sudha Malhotra	Sudha Malhotra & Mukesh (singer)	Hindi
Pahadi	"Hushn Pahadon Ka"	Ram Teri Ganga Maili	Ravindra Jain	Lata Mangeshkar & Suresh Wadkar	Hindi
Pahadi	"Kahe Sataye Kaheko Rulaye"	Qayamat Se Qayamat Tak	Anand-Milind	Alka Yagnik	Hindi
Pahadi	"Sainya Bina Ghar Suna"	Aangan Ki Kali	Bappi Lahiri	Lata Mangeshkar & Bhupinder Singh (musician)	Hindi
Pahadi	"Chup Gaya Badli Mein"	Hum Aapke Dil Mein Rehte Hain	Anu Malik	Udit Narayan & Alka Yagnik	Hindi
Pahadi	Heer	Jab Tak Hain Jaan	A. R. Rahman	Harshdeep Kaur	
Pahadi	Innum Konjam Naeram	Maryan (film)	A. R. Rahman		
Palasi	Gori Tera Gaun Bada Pyara	Chitchor	Ravindra Jain	K. J. Yesudas	Hindi
Palasi	Hamari yad aayegi kabhi tanhaiyon men	Hamari Yaad Aayegi	Snehal Bhatkar	Mubarak Begum	Hindi
Pavani (raga)	Paartha Vizhi Paarthapadi	Gunaa	Ilaiyaraaja	K. J. Yesudas	
Pilu / Kapi	O Sukumara	Sita Rama Kalyanam (1961 film)	Gali Penchala Narasimha Rao	Ghantasala (musician) & P. Susheela	Telugu
Pilu / Kapi	Dhadakate Dil Ki Tamanna	Shama (1961film)	Ghulam Mohammed	Suraiya	Hindi
Pilu / Kapi	Ab Ke Baras Bhejo Bhaiya Ko Babul	Bandini (film)	S. D. Burman	Asha Bhosle	Hindi
Pilu / Kapi	Allah Megh De, Pani De Chaaya De Ra Rama Megh De	Guide (film)	S. D. Burman	S. D. Burman	Hindi
Pilu / Kapi	Kali Ghata Chhaye Mora Jiya Tarasaye	Sujata (1959 film)	S. D. Burman	Geeta Dutt	Hindi
Pilu / Kapi	Nadiya Kinare Harayee Aayee Kangna	Abhimaan (1973 film)	S. D. Burman	Lata Mangeshkar	Hindi
Pilu / Kapi	Ishq Par Zor Nahin	Ishq Par Zor Nahin	S. D. Burman	Lata Mangeshkar	Hindi
Pilu / Kapi	Tere Bin Soone Nayan Hamare	Meri Surat Teri Ankhen	S. D. Burman	Lata Mangeshkar & Mohammed Rafi	Hindi
Pilu / Kapi	Kahe Gumana Kare	Tansen (film)	Khemchand Prakash	K. L. Saigal	Hindi
Pilu / Kapi	Prabhuji	Hospital (1943 film)	Kamal Dasgupta	Kanan Devi	Hindi
Pilu / Kapi	Zi ndagi Khwab Hai	Jagte Raho	Anil Biswas (composer)	Mukesh (singer)	Hindi
Pilu / Kapi	Evarura, Neevevarura	Aggi Ramudu	S. M. Subbaiah Naidu	P. Bhanumathi	Telugu
Pilu / Kapi	Chinnanchiru Kiliye	Manamagal	C. R. Subbaraman	M.L. Vasanthakumari	
Pilu / Kapi	Vaddura Kannayya	Ardhangi	Master Venu	jikki	Telugu
Pilu / Kapi	Gopala Nanda Gopala	Sri Venkateswara Mahatyam	Pendyala (composer)	Santha Kumari	Telugu
Pilu / Kapi	Aaj ki Raat Badi Shokh Badi Natkhat Hai	Nai Umar Ki Nai Fasal	Roshan (music director)	Mohammed Rafi	Hindi
Pilu / Kapi	Baharon Ne Mera Chaman Loot Kar	Devar	Roshan (music director)	Mukesh (singer)	Hindi
Pilu / Kapi	Maine Shayad Tumhen, Pahle Bhi Kahin Dekha Hai	Barsaat Ki Raat	Roshan (music director)	Mohammed Rafi	Hindi
Pilu / Kapi	Vikal Mora Manva, Tum Bin Hai	Mamta (1966 film)	Roshan (music director)	Lata Mangeshkar	Hindi
Pilu / Kapi	Apni Kaho Kuchh Meri Suno, Kya Dil Ka Lagana Bhul Gaye	Parchhain	C. Ramchandra	Lata Mangeshkar & Talat Mahmood	Hindi
Pilu / Kapi	Dheere Se Aaja Ri Akhiyan Mein Nindiya Men	Albela (1951 film)	C. Ramchandra	Lata Mangeshkar	Hindi
Pilu / Kapi	Naina Kahe Ko Lagaye	Joru Ka Bhai	Jaidev	Asha Bhosle	Hindi
Pilu / Kapi	Chandan Ka Palna Resham Ki Dori	Shabaab (film)	Naushad	Hemant Kumar	Hindi
Pilu / Kapi	Dhoondho Dhoondho Re Saajna	Gunga Jumna	Naushad	Lata Mangeshkar	Hindi
Pilu / Kapi	Hai Hai Rasiya Tu Bada Bedardi	Dil Diya Dard Liya	Naushad	Asha Bhosle	Hindi
Pilu / Kapi	Jhule Mein Pavan Ki Ayi Bahar	Baiju Bawra (film)	Naushad	Lata Mangeshkar & Mohammed Rafi	Hindi
Pilu / Kapi	Mera Pyar Bhi Tu Hai Yeh Bahar Bhi Tu Hai	Saathi (1968 film)	Naushad	Lata Mangeshkar & Mukesh (singer)	Hindi
Pilu / Kapi	More Sainya Ji Utarenge Paar Nadiya Dhire Baho	Uran Khatola (film)	Naushad	Lata Mangeshkar & Chorus	Hindi
Pilu / Kapi	Na Manu Na Manu Dagabjaaz Tori Batiya Na Manu Re	Gunga Jumna	Naushad	Lata Mangeshkar	Hindi
Pilu / Kapi	Pyari Dulhaniya	Mother India	Naushad	Shamshad Begum	Hindi
Pilu / Kapi	Paa Laagoon Kar Jori Re	Aap Ki Sewa Mein	Datta Davjekar	Lata Mangeshkar	Hindi
Pilu / Kapi	Mat Maro Shyam Pichkari	Durgesh Nandani	Hemant Kumar	Lata Mangeshkar	Hindi
Pilu / Kapi	Na Jao Saiyan Chhuda Ke Baiyan	Sahib Bibi Aur Ghulam	Hemant Kumar	Geeta Dutt	Hindi
Pilu / Kapi	Konte choopulenduku lera	Srimanthudu (1971 film)	T. Chalapathi Rao	P. Susheela	Telugu
Pilu / Kapi	Naluguru Navverura	Vichitra Kutumbam	T. V. Raju	P. Susheela	Telugu
Pilu / Kapi	Badi Der Bhai Kab Loge Khabar	Basant Bahar (film)	Shankar–Jaikishan	Mohammed Rafi	Hindi
Pilu / Kapi	Banwari Re Jeene Ka Sahara	Ek Phool Char Kante	Shankar–Jaikishan	Lata Mangeshkar	Hindi
Pilu / Kapi	Din Sara Guzara Tore Angana	Junglee (1961 film)	Shankar–Jaikishan	Lata Mangeshkar & Mohammed Rafi	Hindi
Pilu / Kapi	Din Sara Guzara Tore Angana	New Delhi (1956 film)	Shankar–Jaikishan	Lata Mangeshkar	Hindi
Pilu / Kapi	Sur Na Saje Kya Gaon Main	Basant Bahar (film)	Shankar–Jaikishan	Manna Dey	Hindi
Pilu / Kapi	Pilichina Biguvatara	Malliswari (1951 film)	S. Rajeswara Rao	P. Bhanumathi	Telugu
Pilu / Kapi	Andaala Bommatho	Amarasilpi Jakkanna	S. Rajeswara Rao	P. Susheela	Telugu
Pilu / Kapi	Yemivvagalanu Danara	Vasantha Sena (1967 film)	S. Rajeswara Rao	P. Susheela	Telugu
Pilu / Kapi	Rasakreeda Ika	Sangeeta Lakshmi	S. Rajeswara Rao	P. Susheela & S. Janaki	Telugu
Pilu / Kapi	Maine Rang Li Aaj Chunariya Sajana Tore Rang Me	Dulhan Ek Raat Ki	Madan Mohan (composer)	Lata Mangeshkar	Hindi
Pilu / Kapi	Jaiye Aap Kahan Jayenge	Mere Sanam	O. P. Nayyar	Asha Bhosle	Hindi
Pilu / Kapi	Kabhi Aar Kabhi Paar	Aar Paar	O. P. Nayyar	Shamshad Begum	Hindi
Pilu / Kapi	Kaisa Jadoo Balama Tune	12 O'Clock (film)	O. P. Nayyar	Geeta Dutt	Hindi
Pilu / Kapi	Main Soya Ankhian Meeche	Phagun (1958 film)	O. P. Nayyar	Asha Bhosle & Mohammed Rafi	Hindi
Pilu / Kapi	Ai Meri Johara Zabeen, Tujhe Maaloom Nahin	Waqt (1965 film)	Ravi (composer)	Manna Dey	Hindi
Pilu / Kapi	Na Jhatko Zulf Se Pani	Shehnai (1964 film)	Ravi (composer)	Mohammed Rafi	Hindi
Pilu / Kapi	More Kaanha Jo Aaye Palat Ke	Sardari Begum	Vanraj Bhatia	Arati Ankalikar-Tikekar	Hindi
Pilu / Kapi	Tere Pyar Ka	Dhool Ka Phool	Datta Naik	Lata Mangeshkar & Mahendra Kapoor	Hindi
Pilu / Kapi	Senthamizh Thenmozhiyal	Maalaiyitta Mangai	Viswanathan–Ramamoorthy	T. R. Mahalingam (actor)	
Pilu / Kapi	Nadumekkade neeku navalamani	Kodallostunnaru Jagratta(1980 film)	Satyam (composer)	S. P. Balasubrahmanyam	Telugu
Pilu / Kapi	Navarasa Suma Maalika	Meghasandesam	Ramesh Naidu	K. J. Yesudas	Telugu
Pilu / Kapi	Chura Liya Hai Tumne Jo Dil Ko	Yaadon Ki Baaraat	R. D. Burman	Mohammed Rafi & Asha Bhosle	Hindi
Pilu / Kapi	Surmayi Akhiyon Mein Nanha Munna Ek Sapna De Jaa Re	Sadma	Ilaiyaraaja	K. J. Yesudas	Hindi
Pilu / Kapi	Chembarathi Poovu	Chembaruthi	Ilaiyaraaja	K. S. Chithra, Mano (singer)	
Pilu / Kapi	Chinna Chinna Vanna Kuyil	Mouna Ragam	Ilaiyaraaja	S. Janaki	
Pilu / Kapi	Chinna Thaai Aval	Thalapathi	Ilaiyaraaja	S. Janaki	
Pilu / Kapi	Hey Paadal Ondru	Priya (1978 film)	Ilaiyaraaja	S. Janaki, K.J. Yesudas	
Pilu / Kapi	Kanne Kalaimaane	Moondram Pirai	Ilaiyaraaja	K.J. Yesudas	
Pilu / Kapi	Saami Kitta Solli	Aavarampoo	Ilaiyaraaja	S.P. Balasubrahmanyam, S. Janaki	
Pilu / Kapi	Thanni Thotti	Sindhu Bhairavi	Ilaiyaraaja	K.J. Yesudas	
Pilu / Kapi	Thumbi Vaa	Olangal	Ilaiyaraaja	S. Janaki	
Pilu / Kapi	Tu Jo Mere Sur Men	Chitchor	Ravindra Jain	K. J. Yesudas	Hindi
Pilu / Kapi	De De Pyar De	Sharaabi	Bappi Lahiri	Kishore Kumar	Hindi
Pilu / Kapi	Mainu Ishq Da Lag Gaya Rog	Dil Hai Ke Manta Nahin	Nadeem–Shravan	Anuradha Paudwal	Hindi
Pilu / Kapi	Aalankuyil Koovum Rayil	Parthiban Kanavu	Vidyasagar	Harini & Srikanth	
Pilu / Kapi	Ghanan Ghanan	Lagaan	A. R. Rahman	Udit Narayan & Sukhwinder Singh & Alka Yagnik & Shankar Mahadevan & Shaan (singer) & Kishori Gowariker	Hindi
Pilu / Kapi	Jhoola bahon ka	Doli Saja Ke Rakhna	A. R. Rahman	Sadhana Sargam, Srinivas	
Pilu / Kapi	Piano Theme (based on)	1947 Earth	A. R. Rahman	A. R. Rahman	
Pilu / Kapi	Chaka Chak	Atrangi Re	A. R. Rahman	Shreya Ghoshal	
Pilu / Kapi	Kappal Yerri Poyaachu	Indian	A. R. Rahman	S. P. Balasubrahmanyam & P. Susheela	
Pilu / Kapi	Pachai kilighal	Indian	A. R. Rahman	K.J. Yesudas	
Pilu / Kapi	Pacha Kiligal	Indian	A. R. Rahman	K.J. Yesudas	
Pilu / Kapi	Pyar ye	Rangeela (film)	A. R. Rahman	Kavitha Krishnamurthy	
Pilu / Kapi	I Love You (Jeeva Hoovagide)	Nee Nanna Gellalare	Ilaiyaraaja	Dr. Rajkumar	Kannada
Pilu / Kapi (Humming bit is in Desh)	Kadhal Rojave	Roja	A. R. Rahman	S.P. Balasubrahmanyam	
Pilu / Kapi	En Mel Vizhundha	May Madham	A. R. Rahman	P. Jayachandran & K. S. Chitra	
Poornalalitha	Chamaku Chamaku	Kondaveeti Donga	Ilaiyaraaja	S. P. Balasubrahmanyam & K. S. Chitra	
Puriya Dhanashree / Pantuvarāḷi / Kamavardhani	Ruth aa gayi re	1947: Earth	A. R. Rahman	Sukhwinder Singh	
Puriya Dhanashree / Pantuvarāḷi / Kamavardhani	Hai Rama	Rangeela (film)	A. R. Rahman	Hariharan & Swarnalatha	
Puriya Dhanashree / Pantuvarāḷi / Kamavardhani	Machcha Machiniye	Star	A. R. Rahman		
Purna Kambhoji	Arabi Kadaloram	Bombay (film)	A. R. Rahman		
Punnagavarali & Nadanamakriya mixed	Satrangi Re	Dil Se	A R Rahman	Sonu Nigam & Kavitha Krishnamurthy	
Reethigowla	Maruvaarthai	Enai Noki Paayum Thota	Darbuka Siva	Sid Sriram	
Reethigowla	Azhagana Ratchashiyae	Mudhalvan	A. R. Rahman	S. P. Balasubrahmanyam, Harini & G. V. Prakash	
Reethigowla	Chinna Kannan Azhaikkiraan	Kavikkuyil	Ilaiyaraaja	M. Balamuralikrishna	
Reethigowla	Kangal Irandal	Subramaniapuram	James Vasanthan	Belly Raj & Deepa Miriam	
Reethigowla	Thalaiyai Kuniyum Thaamaiye	Oru Odai Nadhiyagirathu	Ilaiyaraaja	S. P. Balasubrahmanyam	
Reethigowla	Chidiya tu Hoti tu	Nayak (2001 Hindi film)	A. R. Rahman		
Reethigowla	Meetadha Oru Veenai	Poonthottam	Ilaiyaraaja	Hariharan& Mahalakshmi Iyer	
Revathi	Mandhira Punnagai	Manal Kayiru	M S Viswanathan	S. P. Balasubrahmanyam	
Sahana	Aaakasa Pandirilo	Shri Rajeswari Vilas Coffee Club 1976	Pendyala (composer)	P. Susheela	Telugu
Sahana	Azaghe sugama	Paarthale Paravasam	A. R. Rahman	Srinivas, Sadhana Sargam	
Sama / Yadukulakamboji	Varalama	Sarvam Thaala Mayam	A. R. Rahman & Rajiv Menon	Sriram Parthasarathy	
Sama / Yadukulakamboji	Kuluvaalilee	Muthu	A. R. Rahman		
Sankarabharanam	Ide Haadu	Thirugu Baana(1983 film)	Satyam (composer)	S. P. Balasubrahmanyam	Kannada
Sankarabharanam	Oh Vennila	Kadhal Desam	A. R. Rahman	P. Unni Krishnan	
Sankarabharanam	Thendrale	Kadhal Desam	A. R. Rahman	P. Unni Krishnan & @Mano (singer) & Dominique Cerejo	
Sankarabharanam	Avalum Nanum	Achcham Yenbadhu Madamaiyada	A. R. Rahman	Vijay Yesudas	
Saramati	Mari Mari Ninne	Sindhu Bhairavi	Ilaiyaraaja	K. J. Yesudas	
Saramati & Sivaranjani & Mohanam	Snehidhane	Alaipayuthey	A. R. Rahman	Sadhana Sargam, Srinivas	
Saramati	Ellellu Sangeethave	Malaya Marutha	Vijaya Bhaskar	K. J. Yesudas	Kannada
Saranga, Hamsanandhi, Ragamalika ( Bihag, kalyani, Vasantha and back to Bihag)	Suttum vizhi	Kandukondain Kandukondain	A. R. Rahman	Hariharan	
Sarasangi / Nat Bhairav	Ellorum Sollum Paattu	Marupadiyum	Ilaiyaraaja	S. P. Balasubrahmanyam	
Sarasangi / Nat Bhairav	Endrendrum Aanandhame	Kadal Meengal	Ilaiyaraaja	Malaysia Vasudevan	
Sarasangi / Nat Bhairav	Maharaajanodu	Sathi Leelavathi (1995 film)	Ilaiyaraaja	P. Unni Krishnan, K. S. Chithra	
Sarasangi / Nat Bhairav	Malligaye Malligaye	Periya Veetu Pannakkaran	Ilaiyaraaja	K. J. Yesudas, K. S. Chitra	
Sarasangi / Nat Bhairav	Meenamma Meenamma	Rajadhi Raja (1989 film)	Ilaiyaraaja	Mano, K. S. Chitra	
Sarasangi / Nat Bhairav	Pudhusu Pudhusu	Manitha Jaathi	Ilaiyaraaja	Gangai Amaran, S. Janaki	
Sarasangi / Nat Bhairav	Thananthana Kummi Kotti	Athisaya Piravi	Ilaiyaraaja	Malaysia Vasudevan, K. S. Chithra	
Sarasangi / Nat Bhairav	Pavadisu Paramathma	Sri Srinivasa Kalyana	Rajan-Nagendra	S. P. Balasubrahmanyam	Kannada
Sarasangi / Nat Bhairav & Dharmavati	Thamizha Thamizha	Roja	A. R. Rahman		
Senjurutti (along with Neelambari & Kurinji, Sankarabaranam & Interlude is based on Hamsadhvani)	En veetu thotathil	Gentleman	A. R. Rahman	S. P. Balasubrahmanyam & Sujatha Mohan	
Senjurutti	Meet Na Mila Re Man Ka	Abhimaan	S D Burman	Kishore Kumar	
Shanmukhapriya	Ethra Pookaalam	Rakkuyilin Ragasadassil	K. J. Yesudas & Arundhathi		
Shanmukhapriya & Hemavati	Ruby Ruby	Sanju	A. R. Rahman	Shashwath Singh & Poorvi Koutish	
Shanmukhapriya	Confusion Theerkaname	Summer in Bethlehem	M. G. Sreekumar		
Shivaranjani	Aandavane Un paadangalai	Oli Vilakku	M.S.Viswanathan	P.Susheela	
Shivaranjani	Abhinava Taravo naa Abhimana Taravo	Sivaranjani (film)	Ramesh Naidu	S. P. Balasubrahmanyam	Telugu
Shivaranjani	Shilegalu Sangeethava Haadide	Ratha Sapthami	Upendra Kumar	S. P. Balasubrahmanyam, S. Janaki	Kannada
Shivaranjani	Shivaranjani Nava Ragini	Thoorpu Padamara	Ramesh Naidu	S. P. Balasubrahmanyam	Telugu
Shivaranjani	Porale Ponnuthayee Solo Version	Karuthamma	A. R. Rahman		
Shivaranjani & Mohanam	Thiruppugazh	Kaaviya Thalaivan (2014 film)	A. R. Rahman		
Shivaranjani	Kanum kanum	Thiruda thiruda	A. R. Rahman	Mano	
Shivaranjani	Thaneerai kathalikum	Mr. Romeo	A. R. Rahman	Swarnalatha	
Shivaranjani	Thanga Thaamarai Magale	Minsara Kanavu	A. R. Rahman		
Shivaranjani & Madhuvanti	Rasiya	Mangal Pandey: The Rising	A. R. Rahman	Richa Sharma	
Shree (Carnatic raga)	Theendai	En Swasa Kaatre	A. R. Rahman	S. P. Balasubrahmanyam & K.S. Chitra	
Shree (Hindustani raga)	Prabhu Charanon Men	Andolan(1951 film)	Pannalal Ghosh	Parul Ghosh	Hindi
Shree (Hindustani raga) & Kanada	Nelaraja Vennela raja	Malliswari (1951 film)	S. Rajeswara Rao	P. Bhanumathi	Telugu
Shree (Hindustani raga)	Hadonda Haaduve	Naandi (film)	Vijaya Bhaskar	P. B. Sreenivas	Kannada
Shree ranjani	Nadham enum Kovililay	Manmadha Leelai	M S Viswanathan	Vani Jairam	
Shubhapantuvarali	Kambada Myalina Gombeye	Nagamandala	C. Ashwath	Sangeetha Katti	Kannada
Shubhapantuvarali	Azhaikkiran Madhavan	Sri Raghavendrar	Ilayaraja	K J Yesudas, C. Dinesh	Tamil
Shuddha Dhanyasi / Raag Dhani	Prabhu Tero Nam Jo Dhyae Phal Paye	Hum Dono (1961 film)	Jaidev	Lata Mangeshkar	Hindi
Shuddha Dhanyasi / Raag Dhani	Kabhi Tanhaiyon me Yun	Hamari Yaad Aayegi	Snehal Bhatkar	Mubarak Begum	Hindi
Shuddha Dhanyasi / Raag Dhani	Badan Pe Sitare Lapete Hue	Prince	Shankar-Jaikishan	Mohd. Rafi	
Shuddha Dhanyasi / Raag Dhani (with mild traces of Abheri/Bhimpalasi also)	Swara Raga Ganga Pravahame	Sargam	Bombay Ravi	K J Yesudas	Malayalam
Shuddha Dhanyasi / Raag Dhani (Eastern Folk Version)	Gori Tera Gaon Bada Pyara	Chitchor	Ravindra Jain	K J Yesudas	Hindi
Shuddha Dhanyasi / Raag Dhani	Ila Nenje Vaa	Vanna Vanna Pookkal	Ilaiyaraaja	K J Yesudas	
Shuddha Dhanyasi/Raag Dhani (Abheri in Saxophone)	Kanaa Kandenadi	Parthiban Kanavu (2003 film)	Vidyasagar (composer)	Madhu Balakrishnan	
Shuddha Dhanyasi / Raag Dhani	Aila Aila	I (film)	A. R. Rahman		
Shuddha Dhanyasi / Raag Dhani	Thodu Thodu Enave	Thullatha Manamum Thullum	S. A. Rajkumar	K S Chitra & Hariharan	
Shuddha Dhanyasi / Raag Dhani	Heartiley Battery	Nanban	Harris Jayaraj	Vedala Hemachandra	
Shuddha Dhanyasi / Raag Dhani	Pranavalaya	Shyam Singha Roy	Mickey J Meyer	Anurag Kulkarni	
Shuddha Dhanyasi / Raag Dhani	Daddy Cool (English song)	Take the Heat off Me (Album)	Boney M	Boney M	
Shudh Kalyan	Mehndi Hai Rachnewali	Zubeidaa	A. R. Rahman		
Shades of Kafi (raga) and Jhinjhoti	Be Nazaaraa	Mom (film)	A. R. Rahman		
Simhendramadhyamam	Srikanta Vishkanta	Anuraga Aralithu	Upendra Kumar	Dr. Rajkumar	Kannada
Sindhu Bhairavi	Margazhi Thingal	Sangamam	A. R. Rahman	S. Janaki	
Sindhu Bhairavi	Mann Mohanaa	Jodhaa Akbar	A. R. Rahman	Bela Shende	
Sindhubhairavi	Tanha Tanha	Rangeela	A. R. Rahman	Asha Bhosle	
Sindhubhairavi	Yaaron Sunlo Zara	Rangeela	A. R. Rahman	Udit Narayan & K S Chitra	
Sindhubhairavi	Mauja Hi Mauja	Jab We Met	Pritam Chakraborty	Mika Singh	
Sindhubhairavi	Mano To Bhagwaan	Dashavataar	Himesh Reshammiya	Hariharan	
Sindhu Bhairavi	Muthumani Maalai	Chinna Gounder	Ilaiyaraaja	S. P. Balasubrahmanyam & P. Susheela	
Sindhu Bhairavi	Naan Oru Sindhu	Sindhu Bhairavi	Ilaiyaraaja	K. S. Chithra	
Sindhu Bhairavi	Shenbagame Shenbagame	Enga Ooru Pattukaran	Ilaiyaraaja	Mano	
Sindhu Bhairavi	Unakkenna Mele Nindraai	Simla Special	M. S. Viswanathan	S. P. Balasubrahmanyam	
Sindhu Bhairavi	Desert Storm	Warriors of Heaven and Earth	A. R. Rahman		
Sindhu Bhairavi	Kulirudhu Kulirudhu	Taj Mahal (1999 film)	A. R. Rahman		
Sindhu Bhairavi	Kun Faaya Kun	Rockstar (2011 film)	A. R. Rahman		
Sindhu Bhairavi	Rang De Basanti	Rang De Basanti	A. R. Rahman	Daler Mehndi & K. S. Chithra	
Sindhu Bhairavi	Rang De Basanti Chola	The Legend of Bhagat Singh	A. R. Rahman		
Sindhu Bhairavi	Sabaq Aisa	Tehzeeb (2003 film)	A. R. Rahman	Madhushree	
Sindhu Bhairavi	The dichotomy of fame	Rockstar (2011 film)	A. R. Rahman		
Sindhu Bhairavi (Shasha Tirtupati) Parts)	Punnagaye	24 (Film)	A. R. Rahman	Shashaa Tirupati & Haricharan	
Sohni / Hamsanandi & Bahar & Jaunpuri & Yaman / Kalyani (raga)	Kuhu Kuhu Bole Koyaliya (H) / Haayi Haayigaa Aamani Saage (T)	Suvarna Sundari	P. Adinarayana Rao	Mohammad Rafi & Lata Mangeshkar(H) / Ghantasala (musician) & Jikki (T)	Hindi & Telugu
Sohni / Hamsanandi	Jhumati Chali Hava	Sangeet Samrat Tansen	S. N. Tripathi	Mukesh (singer)	Hindi
Sohni / Hamsanandi	Prem Jogan Ban Ke	Mughal-e-Azam	Naushad	Bade Ghulam Ali Khan	Hindi
Sohni / Hamsanandi	Jivan Jyot Jale	Grahasti (film)	Ravi (composer)	Asha Bhosle	Hindi
Sohni / Hamsanandi	Kanha Re Kanha	Truck Driver(1970 film)	Sonik-Omi	Lata Mangeshkar	Hindi
Subha Panthuvarali & Gujari Todi	Bhor Bhaye	Delhi-6	A. R. Rahman	Shreya Ghoshal & Bade Ghulam Ali Khan	
Sūryā / Sallapa	Isai Arasi	Thai Moogambikai	Ilaiyaraaja	P. Susheela, S. Janaki & S. Rajeshwari	
Sūryā / Sallapa	Raa Raa	Chandramukhi	Vidyasagar	Tippu & Binny Krishnakumar	
Sūryā / Sallapa	Swagathaanjali	Chandramukhi 2	Maragatha Mani (a) M M Keeravani (a) M M Kreem	Sreenidhi Tirumala	
Tilak Kamod	Veena Padave Ragamayi	Sita Rama Kalyanam (1961 film)	Gali Penchala Narasimha Rao	P. Susheela	Telugu
Tilak Kamod	Theliyani Aanandham	Mangalya Balam	Master Venu	P. Susheela	Telugu
Tilak Kamod	Badariya Baras Gayi Us Paar	Moorti(1945)	Bulo C Rani	Mukesh (singer) & Khursheed Bano & Hamida Banu (singer)	Hindi
Tilak Kamod	Hiya Jarat Rahat Din Rain	Godaan	Ravi Shankar	Mukesh (singer)	Hindi
Tilak Kamod	Teri Yaad Dil Se Bhulane	Hariyali Aur Rasta	Shankar–Jaikishan	Mukesh (singer)	Hindi
Tilak Kamod	Ho Gaye Do Rooj	Pyaar Ka Saagar	Ravi (composer)	Mukesh (singer)	Hindi
Tilak Kamod	Tumhare Bin Ji Na Lage Gharmen	Bhumika (film)	Vanraj Bhatia	Preeti Sagar	Hindi
Tilak Kamod	Hamne Tujhko Pyar Kiya Hai Jitna	Dulha Dulhan	Kalyanji–Anandji	Mukesh (singer)	Hindi
Tilak Kamod	Mujhe Mil Gayi Hai Mohabat	First Love(1961 film)	Dattaram Wadkar	Mukesh (singer)	Hindi
Tilak Kamod	Chali Re Chali Re Mai To Des Paraye	Saranga (1961 film)	Sardar Malik	Asha Bhosle	Hindi
Tilak Kamod	Mouname Paarvayaal	Kodimalar	M. S. Viswanathan	P. B. Sreenivas	
Tilang	Gori Gori Gaon Ki Gori Re	Yeh Gulistan Hamara	S. D. Burman	Lata Mangeshkar & Kishore Kumar	Hindi
Tilang	Kaise Kahen Ham	Sharmeelee	S. D. Burman	Kishore Kumar	Hindi
Tilang	Neela Kandhara	Bhookailas (1958 film)	R. Sudarsanam & R. Govardhanam	Ghantasala (musician)	Telugu
Tilang	Jaya Jaya Jaya Sharada Jaya Kalabhi Sharada	Mahakavi Kalidasu	Pendyala (composer)	P. Susheela	Telugu
Tilang	Meri Kahani Bhulnevale Tera Jahan Abad Rahe	Deedar (1951 film)	Naushad	Mohammad Rafi	Hindi
Tilang	Yahi Arman Lekar Aaj Apne Ghar Se Ham Nukale	Shabaab (film)	Naushad	Mohammad Rafi	Hindi
Tilang	Sajna Sang Kahe Neha Lagae	Main Nashe Mein Hoon	Shankar–Jaikishan	Lata Mangeshkar	Hindi
Tilang	Naa Chandamama	Pandava Vanavasam	Ghantasala (musician)	Ghantasala (musician) & P. Susheela	Telugu
Tilang	Niluvumaa Niluvumaa	Amarasilpi Jakkanna	S. Rajeswara Rao	Ghantasala (musician) & P. Susheela	Telugu
Tilang	Lagan Tose Lagi Balma	Dekh Kabira Roya	Madan Mohan (composer)	Lata Mangeshkar	Hindi
Tilang	Chota Sa Baalama Ankhiyan Neend Udaye Le Gayo	Raagini(film 1958)	O. P. Nayyar	Asha Bhosle	Hindi
Tilang	Mein Apne Aap Se Ghabra Gaya Hoon	Bindya	Iqbal Qureshi	Mohammad Rafi	Hindi
Tilang	Manasaa, Kavvinchake	Pandanti Kapuram	S. P. Kodandapani	P. Susheela	Telugu
Tilang	Jaamu Gadichenu Jabili Vodigenu	Mogudu-Pellalu(1985 film)	Ramesh Naidu	S. P. Balasubrahmanyam & P. Susheela	Telugu
Tilang	Naalo Ninne Choodanaa	Vichitra Vivaham(1973 film)	Satyam (composer)	P. Bhanumathi	Telugu
Tilang	Naa Sneham Pandi Premai Nindina Cheliya Ravela	Babu (1975 film)	K. Chakravarthy	S. P. Balasubrahmanyam	Telugu
Tilang	Chota Sa Baalama Ankhiyan Neend Udaye Le Gayo	Mehboob Ki Mehndi	Laxmikant–Pyarelal	Lata Mangeshkar & Mohammad Rafi	Hindi
Tilang	Idu Entha Lokavayya	Narada Vijaya	Ashwath - Vaidi	K. J. Yesudas	Kannada
Todi (raga)	Evaro vastarani, Edo chestarani	Bhoomi Kosam	Pendyala (composer)	Ghantasala (musician)	Telugu
Todi (raga)	Ye geeta geesina nee Roopame	Muttaiduva(1979 film)	K. V. Mahadevan	S. P. Balasubrahmanyam	Telugu
Todi (raga)	Insan Bano	Baiju Bawra (film)	Naushad	Mohammad Rafi	Hindi
Todi (raga)	Eri Main To Prem Divani	Meera (1979 film)	Ravi Shankar	Vani Jairam	Hindi
Todi (raga)	Duniya Na Bhaye Mohe	Basant Bahar (film)	Shankar–Jaikishan	Mohammed Rafi	Hindi
Todi (raga)	palikeDidi bhAgavatamaTa	Bhakta Potana(1966 film)	S. Rajeswara Rao	Ghantasala (musician)	Telugu
Todi (raga)	Duniya Na Bhaye Mohe	Pilpili Saheb(1954 film)	Sardul Singh Kwatra	Lata Mangeshkar	Hindi
Todi (raga)	Gangai Karai Mannanadi	Varusham Padhinaaru	Ilaiyaraaja	K. J. Yesudas	
Todi (raga)	Behene De	Raavanan (Hindi)	A. R. Rahman		
Todi (raga)	Power Star	Puli (2010 film)	A. R. Rahman	Vijay Prakash & Tanvi Shah	
Todi (raga)	Piya Ho	Water (2005 film)	A. R. Rahman	Sukhwinder Singh & Sadhana Sargam	
Todi (raga)	Usure Pogudhey	Raavanan	A. R. Rahman		
Vasantha	Minsara Poove	Padayappa	A. R. Rahman	Srinivas & Nithyashree	
Vaasanthi	Adi manja kizhange	Tajmahal	A. R. Rahman	Ganga Sitharasu, Febi Mani, Theni Kunjaramma, Kanchana	
Vaasanthi	Kurukku siruthavale	Mudhalvan	A. R. Rahman	Hariharan & Swarnalatha	
Vaasanthi	Desh Ka Salaam	Desh Ka Salaam	A. R. Rahman		
Vaasanthi	Theeyil vizhunda thena	Godfather	A. R. Rahman	A. R. Rahman	
Vakulabharanam	Veera Vinayaka	Vedalam	Anirudh Ravichander	Anirudh Ravichander, Vishal Dadlani	Tamil
Yaman / Kalyani (raga)	Rasika balma	Chori Chori (1956 film)	Shankar–Jaikishan	Lata Mangeshkar	Hindi
Yaman / Kalyani (raga)	Kudi Edmaite Porapatu Ledoyi	Devadasu (1953 film)	C. R. Subbaraman	Ghantasala (musician)	Telugu
Yaman / Kalyani (raga)	"Mausam Hai Aashiqana"	Pakeezah	Naushad	Lata Mangeshkar	Hindi
Yaman / Kalyani (raga)	Salalita Raga Sudha Rasa Dhara	Nartanasala (1963 film)	Susarla Dakshinamurthi	M. Balamuralikrishna & Bangalore Latha	Telugu
Yaman / Kalyani (raga)	"Inhi logon ne"	Pakeezah	Naushad	Lata Mangeshkar	Hindi
Yaman / Kalyani (raga)	"Tere Husn Ki Kya Tareef Karun"	Leader (1964 film)	Naushad	Lata Mangeshkar & Mohammed Rafi	Hindi
Yaman / Kalyani (raga)	Madi Sharada Devi	Jayabheri	Pendyala (composer)	Ghantasala (musician) & P. B. Sreenivas & Raghunath Panigrahi	Telugu
Yaman / Kalyani (raga)	"Ehsan Tera Hoga Mujhpar"	Junglee (1961 film)	Shankar–Jaikishan	Lata Mangeshkar & Mohammed Rafi	Hindi
Yaman / Kalyani (raga)	Manasu Padindi Sannayi Pata	Punyavathi	Ghantasala (musician)	Ghantasala (musician) & P. Susheela	Telugu
Yaman / Kalyani (raga)	"Jiya Le Gayo Ji Mora"	Anpadh	Madan Mohan	Lata Mangeshkar	Hindi
Yaman / Kalyani (raga)	Paluka Radate Chilukaa	Shavukaru	Ghantasala (musician)	Ghantasala (musician)	Telugu
Yaman / Kalyani (raga)	"Zaraasi Aahat Hoti Hai"	Haqeeqat (1964 film)	Madan Mohan	Lata Mangeshkar	Hindi
Yaman / Kalyani (raga)	Challani Vennelalo	Santhanam (film)	Susarla Dakshinamurthi	Ghantasala (musician)	Telugu
Yaman / Kalyani (raga)	"Woh Sham Kuch Ajeeb Thi"	Khamoshi (1970 film)	Hemant Kumar	Kishore Kumar	Hindi
Yaman / Kalyani (raga)	Haayi Haayigaa Jaabilli	Velugu Needalu	Pendyala (composer)	Ghantasala (musician) & P. Susheela	Telugu
Yaman / Kalyani (raga)	"Zindagi Bhar Nahi Bhulegi"	Barsaat Ki Raat	Roshan	Lata Mangeshkar & Mohammed Rafi	Hindi
Yaman / Kalyani (raga)	Paala Kadalipai	Chenchu Lakshmi (1958 film)	S. Rajeswara Rao	P. Susheela	Telugu
Yaman / Kalyani (raga)	"Nigahen Milaane ko Jee Chahta Hai"	Dil Hi To Hai	Roshan	Asha Bhosle	Hindi
Yaman / Kalyani (raga)	"Raa Raa Naa Swamy"	Vipra Narayana	S. Rajeswara Rao	P. Bhanumathi	Telugu
Yaman / Kalyani (raga)	"Chupa Lo Yun Dil Mein Pyar Mera"	Mamta	Roshan	Lata Mangeshkar & Hemant Kumar	Hindi
Yaman / Kalyani (raga)	Pelli Chesukoni	Pelli Chesi Choodu	Ghantasala (musician)	Ghantasala (musician)	Telugu
Yaman / Kalyani (raga)	Madhura Bhavaala Sumamaala	Jai Jawan	S. Rajeswara Rao	Ghantasala (musician) & P. Susheela	Telugu
Yaman / Kalyani (raga)	"Ja Re, Badra Bairi Ja"	Bahana	Madan Mohan	Lata Mangeshkar	Hindi
Yaman / Kalyani (raga)	Hosa Baalige Nee Jotheyade	Naa Ninna Bidalaare	Rajan–Nagendra	S. Janaki & S. P. Balasubrahmanyam	Kannada
Yaman / Kalyani (raga)	Paadanaa Vani Kalyaniga	Meghasandesam	Ramesh Naidu	M. Balamuralikrishna	Telugu
Yaman / Kalyani (raga)	"Bhooli Hui Yaadon Mujhe Itna"	Sanjog	Madan Mohan	Mukesh	Hindi
Yaman / Kalyani (raga)	Jaya Jaya Jaya Subhasya	Malliswari (1951 film)	S. Rajeswara Rao	Chorus	Telugu
Yaman / Kalyani (raga)	"Abhi Na Jao Chodkar"	Hum Dono	Jaidev	Asha Bhosle & Mohammed Rafi	Hindi
Yaman / Kalyani (raga)	"Poovai Virisina"	Sri Tirupatamma Katha	Pamarthi	Ghantasala (musician)	Telugu
Yaman / Kalyani (raga)	Chandan Sa Badan	Saraswatichandra	Kalyanji–Anandji	Lata Mangeshkar & Mukesh	Hindi
Yaman / Kalyani (raga)	Tholi Valape Pade Pade	Devata (1965 film)	S. P. Kodandapani	Ghantasala (musician) & P. Susheela	Telugu
Yaman / Kalyani (raga)	"Salaam-E-Ishq Meri Jaan"	Muqaddar Ka Sikandar	Kalyanji-Anandji	Lata Mangeshkar & Kishore Kumar	Hindi
Yaman / Kalyani (raga)	Mannavan Vandhanadi Thozhi	Thiruvarutchelvar	K. V. Mahadevan	P. Susheela	
Yaman / Kalyani (raga)	Sakhiyaa Vivarinchave	Nartanasala (1963 film)	Susarla Dakshinamurthi	P. Susheela	Telugu
Yaman / Kalyani (raga)	"Is Mod Se Jaate Hai"	Aandhi	R. D. Burman	Lata Mangeshkar & Kishore Kumar	Hindi
Yaman / Kalyani (raga)	"Naam Gum Jaayega"	Kinara	R. D. Burman	Lata Mangeshkar & Bhupinder Singh (musician)	Hindi
Yaman / Kalyani (raga)	"Beeti Na Beetayi Raina"	Parichay	R. D. Burman	Lata Mangeshkar & Bhupinder Singh (musician)	Hindi
Yaman / Kalyani (raga)	"Yeh Safar Bahut Hai Kathi"	1942: A Love Story	R. D. Burman	Lata Mangeshkar & Shibaji Chatterjee	Hindi
Yaman / Kalyani (raga)	"Huzur Is Kadar"	Masoom	R. D. Burman	Bhupinder Singh (musician) & Suresh Wadkar	Hindi
Yaman / Kalyani (raga)	"Do Naina Aur Ek Kahani"	Masoom	R. D. Burman	Aarti Mukherjee	Hindi
Yaman / Kalyani (raga)	"Jab Deep Jale Aana"	Chitchor	Ravindra Jain	Hemlata (singer) & K. J. Yesudas	Hindi
Yaman / Kalyani (raga)	"Kabhi Kabhi Mere Dil Mein"	Kabhi Kabhie	Mohammed Zahur Khayyam	Lata Mangeshkar & Mukesh (singer)	Hindi
Yaman / Kalyani (raga)	"Phir Na Kije Meri Gustakh Nigah Ka Gila"	Phir Subah Hogi	Mohammed Zahur Khayyam	Asha Bhosle & Mukesh (singer)	Hindi
Yaman / Kalyani (raga)	"Ek Pyar Ka Nagma Hai"	Shor (film)	Laxmikant-Pyarelal	Lata Mangeshkar & Mukesh (singer)	Hindi
Yaman / Kalyani (raga)	"Aap Ke Anurodh Pe"	Anurodh	Laxmikant-Pyarelal	Kishore Kumar	Hindi
Yaman / Kalyani (raga)	"Woh Jab Yaad Aaye"	Parasmani	Laxmikant-Pyarelal	Lata Mangeshkar & Mohammed Rafi	Hindi
Yaman / Kalyani (raga)	"Tum Bin Jeevan Kaise Beeta"	Anita	Laxmikant-Pyarelal	Mukesh	Hindi
Yaman / Kalyani (raga)	"Aaye Ho Meri Zindagi Mein"	Raja Hindustani	Nadeem-Shravan	Udit Narayan & Alka Yagnik	Hindi
Yaman / Kalyani (raga)	"Sochenge Tumhe Pyaar Karen ke Nahi"	Deewana	Nadeem-Shravan	Kumar Sanu	Hindi
Yaman / Kalyani (raga)	"Pyar Mein Hota Hai Kya Jadu"	Papa Kehte Hai	Rajesh Roshan	Kumar Sanu & Alka Yagnik	Hindi
Yaman / Kalyani (raga)	"Moh Moh Ke Dhaage"	Dum Laga Ke Haisha	Anu Malik	Papon & Monali Thakur	Hindi
Yaman / Kalyani (raga)	"Hamesha Tumko Chaha"	Devdas	Ismail Darbar	Kavita Krishnamurti	Hindi
Yaman / Kalyani (raga)	"Hothon Se Chulo Tum"	Prem Geet	Jagjit singh	Jagjit Singh	Hindi
Yaman / Kalyani (raga)	" Aayat"	Bajirao Mastani	Sanjay Leela Bhansali	Arijit Singh & Mujtaba Aziz Naza & Shadab faridi, Altamash Faridi, Farhan Sabri	Hindi
Yaman / Kalyani (raga)	"Laal Ishq"	Goliyon Ki Raasleela Ram-Leela	Sanjay Leela Bhansali	Arijit Singh, Altamash Faridi, Osman Mir	Hindi
Yaman / Kalyani (raga)	"Aaj Ibaadat"	Bajirao Mastani	Sanjay Leela Bhansali	Javed Bashir	Hindi
Yaman / Kalyani (raga)	"Ek Dil Ek Jaan "	Padmavat	Sanjay Leela Bhansali	Shivam Pathak & Mujtaba Aziz Naza	Hindi
Yaman / Kalyani (raga)	"Aansu bhari hai jeevan ki rahen"	Parvarish	Dattaram Wadkar	Mukesh (singer)	Hindi
Yaman / Kalyani (raga)	Kalisina Hrudayaalalona	Prema Paga	S. Rajeswara Rao	Vani Jairam & S. P. Balasubrahmanyam	Telugu
Yaman / Kalyani (raga)	Palikenu Yedo Ragam	Sangham Chekkina Shilpalu	Ramesh Naidu	S. P. Balasubrahmanyam	Telugu
Yaman / Kalyani (raga)	rangaaru bangaaru chengaavulu	Lava Kusa	Ghantasala (musician)	Ghantasala (musician)	Telugu
Yaman / Kalyani (raga)	Ale Moodade	Godhi Banna Sadharana Mykattu	Charan Raj	Sooraj Santhosh	Kannada
Yaman / Kalyani (raga)	Ee samaya aanandamaya	Babruvahana	T. G. Lingappa	Dr. Rajkumar, S. Janaki	Kannada
Yaman / Kalyani (raga) / Yaman Kalyan	Varaga Nadhi Karai	Sangamam	A. R. Rahman	Shankar Mahadevan	
Yaman / Kalyani (raga) / Yaman Kalyan	Aye Hairathe	Guru (2007 film)	A. R. Rahman		
Yaman / Kalyani (raga), Shyam Kalyan.	Medhuvaagathan	Kochadaiiyaan	A. R. Rahman	S. P. Balasubrahmanyam & Sadhana Sargam	
Yamani Bilaval	Naina milaike	Saathiya (film)	A. R. Rahman		
Yaman / Kalyani (raga) / Yamunakalyani	Devan Kovil Deepam Ondru	Naan Paadum Paadal	Ilaiyaraaja	S. N. Surendar, S. Janaki	
Yaman / Kalyani (raga) / Yamunakalyani	Oru Vaanavil Pole	Kaatrinile Varum Geetham	Ilaiyaraaja	P. Jayachandran, S. Janaki	
Yaman / Kalyani (raga) / Yamunakalyani	Sakthi Kodu	Baba (film)	A. R. Rahman	Karthik	
Yaman / Kalyani (raga) / Yamunakalyani	Yaar Veetil Roja	Idaya Kovil	Ilaiyaraaja	S. P. Balasubrahmanyam	
Yaman / Kalyani (raga) / Yamunakalyani	Yamunai Aatrile	Thalapathi	Ilaiyaraaja	Mitali Banerjee Bhawmik	
Yaman / Kalyani (raga) / Yamunakalyani	Beladingalagi Baa	Huliya Haalina Mevu	G. K. Venkatesh	P. B. Sreenivas	Kannada
