= Kapi (raga) =

Janya raga of Carnatic music

- Arohanam: S R₂ M₁ P N₃ Ṡ
- Avarohanam: Ṡ N₂ D₂ N₂ P M₁ G₂ R₂ S
- Equivalent: Pilu

Kāpi is a popular rāga in Carnatic music, the classical music of South India. Kāpi is a janya rāgam of Kharaharapriya with a meandering vakra scale. Typically performed at slow and medium speeds, it is capable of inducing moods of devotion, pathos and sadness in the listeners. Kāpi is different from the Hindustani raag and thaat Kafi. The equivalent raag in Hindustani is Pilu.

== Structure and Lakshana ==
Kāpi is an audava-vakra sampoorna rāgam with an ascending pentatonic scale and a descending scale with seven notes, but not in a descending order. Use of Kakali Nishadam and Anthara Gandharam make it a Bhashanga Raagam.

- ārohaṇa : S R₂ M₁ P N₃ Ṡ (Note: Alternate notations: Hindustani: S R M P N Ṡ; Western: C D F G B C)
- avarohaṇa : Ṡ N₂ D₂ N₂ P M₁ G₂ R₂ S (Note: Alternate notations: Hindustani: Ṡ Ṉ D Ṉ P M G̱ R S; Western: C B♭ A B♭ G F E♭ D C)

The presence of different nishāda swarās (N_{2} and N_{3}) lends a distinctive quality to Kāpi, along with the fact that it uses a set of vakra swarās (N_{2} D_{2} N_{2}).

There is also a mild presence of shuddha daivatham (D_{1}) that renders an invaluable feeling of devotion to the raagam. This, and the presence of Anthara Gandharam (G_{3}) makes it difficult to pinpoint the exact nature of the avarohana of the raagam.

The original Kapi of Carnatic music (now known as Karnataka Kapi as coined by Professor Pichu Sambamoorthi) was a Janya of Melakarta 22 Kharaharapriya and had the following Sancharas:

- ārohaṇa : S R₂ G₂ M₁ P D₂ N₂ Ṡ
- avarohaṇa : N₂ D₂ P M₁ G₂ G₂ R₂ S

Reference : Sangita Sampradaya Priyadarshini cakram 1-4

== Compositions ==
Some of the popular compositions in Kāpi are:

- Jagadoddhārana Adisidaleshode, Bannisi gopi - Purandaradasa
- Mee Valla Gunadosha Memi, Intha Sowkhya - Thyagaraja
- Venkatachalapate Ninu Nammiti - Muthuswami Dikshitar **
- Viharamanasa Rame, Smarasi Pura, Sree Madhavamanu - Swathi Thirunal
- Enna thavam seydanai Yashoda - Papanasam Sivan
- Bhaja maadhavam anisham - Mysore Vasudevacharya
- Maya Gopabala - K C Kesava Pillai
- Jaanaki ramana dasaratha nandana - Vanamaamalai Jeeyar Swami
- Javo Mat Thum (Upaakhyanam) - Swathi Thirunal
- Chinnanchiru Kiliye (First two stanzas) - Subramanya Bharathi
- Kurai Ondrum Illai (Two charanam verses) - Chakravarti Rajagopalachari
- Karthikeyanai - Mayuram Viswanatha Sastri
- Aravinda Padamalar - Ambujam Krishna
- Charanamule Nammiti - Bhadrachala Ramadasu
- Kanaka Simham - Kalyani Varadarajan
- Kanna Vaa Manivanna Vaa (First two verses) - Ambujam Krishna
- Nee mattume en nenjil nirkirai - Perumal Murugan and K Arun Prakash

** Kāpi of Muthuswami Dikshitar is quite different from the traditional Kāpi and often cited as karNATaka Kāpi

The Moorchana of Kāpi as per Venkatamakhin is S R2 G2 M1 P D2 N2 S/ N2 D2 P M1 G2 G2 R2 S

== Film Songs ==
=== Language:Tamil ===
Song	Movie	Composer	Singer
Dhianame Nee	Ashok Kumar	Alathur V. Subramanyam	M. K. Thyagaraja Bhagavathar
Chinnanciru kiliye Kannammaa (Ragamalika:Kapi, Maand, Vasantha)	Manamagal	Subramania Bharathi,C. R. Subburaman	M. L. Vasanthakumari, V. N. Sundharam
Neela Vanna Kannaa Vaadaa (Ragamalika:Kapi, Yamunakalyani)	Mangaiyar Thilakam	Susarla Dakshinamurthi	R. Balasaraswathi Devi
Poovagi Kayagi	Annai	R. Sudarsanam	P. Bhanumathi
Sentamizh Thenmozhiyaal	Maalaiyitta Mangai	Viswanathan–Ramamoorthy	T. R. Mahalingam
Paatondru	Pasamalar	Viswanathan–Ramamoorthy	K. Jamuna Rani
Madhura Nagaril	Paar Magaley Paar	Viswanathan–Ramamoorthy	P. B. Sreenivas, P. Susheela
Senthur Murugan(Raga Pilu)	Santhi	Viswanathan–Ramamoorthy	P. B. Sreenivas, P. Susheela
Kadhal Siragai	Palum Pazhamum	Viswanathan–Ramamoorthy	P. Susheela
Avan Porukku Ponan	Vazhkai Vazhvatharke	Viswanathan–Ramamoorthy	P. Susheela
Kaalamithu Kaalamithu	Chitthi	M. S. Viswanathan	P. Susheela
Thamizhil Athuoru	Sange Muzhangu	M. S. Viswanathan	T. M. Soundararajan, P. Susheela
Nilavu Vandhu Vaanathaiye	Thirudi	M. S. Viswanathan	S. P. Balasubrahmanyam, P. Susheela
Poomazhai Thoovi	Ninaithadhai Mudippavan	M. S. Viswanathan	T. M. Soundararajan
Naan Paadidum Kavithaiyin	Samayalkaaran	M. S. Viswanathan	T. M. Soundararajan
Un Kannil Near	Vietnam Veedu	K. V. Mahadevan	T. M. Soundararajan
Malargaliley Pala	Thirumal Perumai	K. V. Mahadevan	T. M. Soundararajan
Hari Hari Gokula	Thirumal Perumai	K. V. Mahadevan	T. M. Soundararajan, Master Maharajan, P. Susheela
Antha Sivagami	Pattanathil Bhootham	R. Govardhanam	T. M. Soundararajan, P. Susheela
Madhurai Arasaalum	Thirumalai Thenkumari	Kunnakudi Vaidyanathan	Sirkazhi Govindarajan, L. R. Eswari, M. R. Vijaya
Ye Paadal Ondru	Priya	Ilaiyaraaja	K. J. Yesudas, S. Janaki
Sangathil Padatha	Auto Raja	Ilaiyaraaja	Ilaiyaraaja, S. Janaki
Kanne Kalaimaane	Moondram Pirai	Ilaiyaraaja	K. J. Yesudas
Thanni Thotti	Sindhu Bhairavi	Ilaiyaraaja	K. J. Yesudas
Chinna Chinna Roja Poove	Poovizhi Vasalile	Ilaiyaraaja	K. J. Yesudas
Maathavam Yaen	Raja Rishi	Ilaiyaraaja	S. Janaki, Malaysia Vasudevan
Chinna Chinna Vanna Kuyil	Mouna Ragam	Ilaiyaraaja	S. Janaki
Thaayum Naane	Enkeyo Ketta Kural	Ilaiyaraaja	S. Janaki
Thenthoongum Poove	Kodai Mazhai	Ilaiyaraaja	S. Janaki
Chinna Thayaval(Charukesi traces too)	Thalapathi	Ilaiyaraaja	S. Janaki
Saami Kitta Solli	Aavarampoo	Ilaiyaraaja	S. P. Balasubrahmanyam, S. Janaki
Maalai Soodum Vaelai	Naan Mahaan Alla	Ilaiyaraaja	S. P. Balasubrahmanyam, S. Janaki
Neethana Neethana	Thalattu Padava	Ilaiyaraaja	Arunmozhi, S. Janaki
Goondru Gongura	Chinnavar	Ilaiyaraaja	Mano, K.S. Chitra
Sembaruthi Poovu	Chembaruthi	Ilaiyaraaja	Mano, K.S. Chitra, Bhanumathi
Alaiodu Alaiyaga	Maranthen Mannithen	Ilaiyaraaja	Bhavatharini
Unna Nenachu	Psycho	Ilaiyaraaja	Sid Sriram
Muthu Muthu Therottam(Raga Pilu)	Aani Ver	Shankar–Ganesh	Vani Jairam
Ammamma Saranam	Sattam	Gangai Amaran	S. P. Balasubrahmanyam, Vani Jairam
Anandham Indru	Mannukketha Ponnu	Gangai Amaran	K. J. Yesudas, Vani Jairam
Chinna Chinna Kanavugale Kanna	Thuraimugam	Adithyan	K. S. Chithra
Kaadhal Rojave (Humming in Desh ragam)	Roja	A. R. Rahman	S.P. Balasubrahmanyam, Sujatha Mohan(Humming only)
En Mel Vizhunda	May Maadham	A. R. Rahman	P. Jayachandran, K.S. Chitra
Erani Kuradhani	Kadhalan	A. R. Rahman	S.P. Balasubrahmanyam, S. Janaki
July Matham	Pudhiya Mugam	A. R. Rahman	S.P. Balasubrahmanyam, Annupamaa
Anbae Idhu (Ragam Charukesi touches also)	Rhythm	A. R. Rahman	Sadhana Sargam
Kuchi Kuchi	Bombay	A. R. Rahman	Hariharan, Swarnalatha, G. V. Prakash Kumar
Pachai Kiligal	Indian	A. R. Rahman	K. J. Yesudas, Nirmala Seshadri
Oru Poiyavadhu	Jodi	A. R. Rahman	Hariharan(ver 1), Srinivas, Sujatha Mohan(ver 2)
Velli Malarae	Jodi	A. R. Rahman	S. P. Balasubrahmanyam, Mahalakshmi Iyer
Naalai Ulagam	Love Birds	A. R. Rahman	P. Unnikrishnan, Sujatha Mohan
Kadhali Nee Enna Seivai	Rangeela	A. R. Rahman	P. Unnikrishnan, Kavita Krishnamurthy
Vaaji Vaaji	Sivaji: The Boss	A. R. Rahman	Hariharan, Madhushree
Aalanguyil Koovum Rayyil	Parthiban Kanavu	Vidyasagar	Harini
Thachhiko Thachhiko	Ponniyin Selvan	Vidyasagar	Anuradha Sriram, Mathangi
Vizhiyum Vizhiyum	Sadhurangam	Vidyasagar	Madhu Balakrishnan, Harini
Aasai Aasai(Pallavi and anupallavi only)	Dhool	Vidyasagar	Shankar Mahadevan, Sujatha Mohan
Kaadhal Vandhadhum	Poovellam Un Vasam	Vidyasagar	K. J. Yesudas, Sadhana Sargam
Desingh Raja Thaan	Thavasi	Vidyasagar	S.P. Balasubrahmanyam, Sujatha Mohan
Boomiyea Boomiyea	Sengottai	Vidyasagar	S. P. Balasubrahmanyam, S. Janaki
Thai Masi	Vasanthakala Paravai	Deva	S. P. Balasubrahmanyam, S. Janaki
Angam Unathu Angam	Pudhu Manithan	Deva	S. P. Balasubrahmanyam, K. S. Chithra
Chinna Ponnuthaan	Vaigasi Poranthachu	Deva	Mano, K. S. Chithra
Karuppu Nila	En Aasai Machan	Deva	K. S. Chithra
Karupputhan Enakku	Vetri Kodi Kattu	Deva	Anuradha Sriram
Chinna Roja	Oruvan	Deva	Hariharan
Yeno Yeno	Appu	Deva	Hariharan, Sujatha, Harini
Ravivarman(Charanam only)	Vasanthi	Chandrabose	K.J. Yesudas, K. S. Chithra(humming only)
Andhinera Thendral Kaatru	Inaindha Kaigal	Gyan Varma	S. P. Balasubrahmanyam, P. Jayachandran
Minnal Oru Kodi	V. I. P.	Ranjit Barot	Hariharan, K.S. Chitra
En Kannadi Thoppukkulle	Malabar Police	S. A. Rajkumar	Hariharan, K.S. Chitra
Pallangkuzhiyin	Aanandham	S. A. Rajkumar	P. Unnikrishnan, Harini
Karisai Kaattu Pennae	Raja	S. A. Rajkumar	K. S. Chitra, Manikka Vinayagam
Idhu Nee Irukkum Nenjamadi	Krishna	S. A. Rajkumar	Mano
Chinna Chinna Kannukulle	Kamarasu	S. A. Rajkumar	P. Unnikrishnan, K.S. Chitra
Ithu Kuzhanthai	Oru Thalai Ragam	T. Rajendar	S. P. Balasubrahmanyam
Vannam Konda(Ragam Pilu)	Sigaram	S. P. Balasubrahmanyam	S. P. Balasubrahmanyam
Enna Azhagu	Love Today	Shiva	S. P. Balasubrahmanyam
Nee Malaraa Malaraa	Arputham	Shiva	P. Unnikrishnan, K.S. Chitra
Antha Vaanukku(M), Naan Thai Yenndru(F)	Poomagal Oorvalam	Shiva	P. Unnikrishnan, K.S. Chitra
Sollathan Ninaikiren	Kadhal Sugamanathu	Shiva	K.S. Chitra, S. P. Balasubrahmanyam(Pathos)
Poonkuruvi Paadadi	Sundara Kandam	Deepak	S. Janaki, Mano
Mukundha Mukundha	Dasavathaaram	Himesh Reshammiya	Sadhana Sargam
Kannukkulle kadhala	Thamizh	Bharadwaj	P. Unnikrishnan, Swarnalatha
Thozha Thozha Kanavu Thozha	Pandavar Bhoomi	Bharadwaj	Chitra Sivaraman, Yugendran
Nachendru Ichondru	Attahasam	Bharadwaj	Srinivas, Ujaini
Thuli Thuliyaai Kottum Mazhai	Paarvai Ondre Podhume	Bharani	Hariharan, Swarnalatha
Urugudhe Maragudhe	Veyil	G. V. Prakash Kumar	Shankar Mahadevan, Shreya Ghoshal
Unn Perai Sollum	Angadi Theru	G. V. Prakash Kumar	Naresh Iyer, Shreya Ghoshal, Haricharan
Ragasiya Kanavugal	Bheemaa	Harris Jayaraj	Hariharan, Madhushree
Asku Laska	Nanban	Harris Jayaraj	Vijay Prakash, Chinmayi, SuVi
Kalasala Kalasala	Osthe	S. Thaman	Solar Sai, L R Eswari, T Rajendar
Kannum Kannumthan	Thirupaachi	Mani Sharma	Harish Raghavendra, Uma Ramanan, Premji Amaren
Malligai Malligai	Arasu	Mani Sharma	Vijay Yesudas, Sujatha
Mazhaye Mazhaye	June R	Sharreth	Hariharan, Sujatha
Chellame Chellam	Album	Karthik Raja	Hariharan, Shreya Ghoshal
Jalsa Panungada	Chennai 600028	Yuvan Shankar Raja	Ranjith, Tippu, Premji Amaran, Haricharan, Karthik
Vennmegam Pennaga(Gourimanohari touches also)	Yaaradi Nee Mohini	Yuvan Shankar Raja	Hariharan
Kan Pesum Varthaigal	7G Rainbow Colony	Yuvan Shankar Raja	Karthik
Ore Oru Kanpaarvai	Nedunalvaadai	Jose Franklin	Yazin Nizar, Purnima Krishnan
Onnavitta Yaarum Yenakilla	Seemaraja	D. Imman	Sean Roldan, Shreya Ghoshal
Paakaathey Paakaathey	Varuthapadatha Valibar Sangam	D. Imman	Vijay Yesudas, Pooja Vaidyanath
Kodi Aruvi	Mehandi Circus	Sean Roldan	Pradeep Kumar, Nithyashree

=== Language:Malayalam ===
Song	Movie	Composer	Singer
Thumbi vaa thumbakudathil	Olangal	Ilaiyaraaja	S. Janaki
Varamanjaladiya	Pranayavarnangal	Vidyasagar	Sujatha
Etrayo janmamay	Summer in Bethlehem	Vidyasagar	Srinivas, Sujatha
Kandu kandu kandilla	Ishtam	Mohan Sithara	K. J. Yesudas
Karimizhikuruviye	Meesa Madhavan	Vidyasagar	V. Devanand, Sujatha
Innale ente nenjile	Balettan	M. Jayachandran	K. J. Yesudas
Ente khalbile	Classmates	Alex Paul	Vineeth Sreenivasan
Muttathe mulle chole	Mayavi	Alex Paul	K. J. Yesudas
Ishtamalle ishtamalle	Chocolate	Alex Paul	Shahabaz Aman
Anuraga vilochananayi	Neelathamara	Vidyasagar	Shreekumar Vakkiyil, Shreya Ghoshal

=== Language : Telugu ===
Song	Movie	Composer	Singers
Evarura, Neevevarura	Aggi Ramudu	S. M. Subbaiah Naidu	P. Bhanumathi
Nadumekkade neeku navalamani	Kodallostunnaru Jagratta(1980 film)	Satyam (composer)	S. P. Balasubrahmanyam

Songs listed below are composed in Raga Pilu (raga) which is Hindustani equivalent to Raga Kapi (raga)

=== Language : Telugu ===
Song	Movie	Composer	Singers
O Sukumara	Sita Rama Kalyanam (1961 film)	Gali Penchala Narasimha Rao	Ghantasala (musician) & P. Susheela
Vaddura Kannayya	Ardhangi	Master Venu	jikki
Gopala Nanda Gopala	Sri Venkateswara Mahatyam	Pendyala (composer)	Santha Kumari
Konte choopulenduku lera	Srimanthudu (1971 film)	T. Chalapathi Rao	P. Susheela
Naluguru Navverura	Vichitra Kutumbam	T. V. Raju	P. Susheela
Pilichina Biguvatara	Malliswari (1951 film)	S. Rajeswara Rao	P. Bhanumathi
Andaala Bommatho	Amarasilpi Jakkanna	S. Rajeswara Rao	P. Susheela
Yemivvagalanu Danara	Vasantha Sena (1967 film)	S. Rajeswara Rao	P. Susheela
Rasakreeda Ika	Sangeeta Lakshmi	S. Rajeswara Rao	P. Susheela & S. Janaki
Navarasa Suma Maalika	Meghasandesam	Ramesh Naidu	K. J. Yesudas

Songs listed below are composed in Raga Pilu which is the Hindustani equivalent of Raga Kapi.

=== Language : Hindi ===
Song	Movie	Composer	Singers
Dhadakate Dil Ki Tamanna	Shama (1961film)	Ghulam Mohammed (composer)	Suraiya
Ab Ke Baras Bhejo Bhaiya Ko Babul	Bandini (film)	S. D. Burman	Asha Bhosle
Allah Megh De, Pani De Chaaya De Ra Rama Megh De	Guide (film)	S. D. Burman	S. D. Burman
Kali Ghata Chhaye Mora Jiya Tarasaye	Sujata (1959 film)	S. D. Burman	Geeta Dutt
Nadiya Kinare Harayee Aayee Kangna	Abhimaan (1973 film)	S. D. Burman	Lata Mangeshkar
Ishq Par Zor Nahin	Ishq Par Zor Nahin	S. D. Burman	Lata Mangeshkar
Tere Bin Soone Nayan Hamare	Meri Surat Teri Ankhen	S. D. Burman	Lata Mangeshkar & Mohammed Rafi
Kahe Gumana Kare	Tansen (film)	Khemchand Prakash	K. L. Saigal
Prabhuji	Hospital (1943 film)	Kamal Dasgupta	Kanan Devi
Zindagi Khwab Hai	Jagte Raho	Anil Biswas (composer)	Mukesh (singer)
Aaj ki Raat Badi Shokh Badi Natkhat Hai	Nai Umar Ki Nai Fasal	Roshan (music director)	Mohammed Rafi
Baharon Ne Mera Chaman Loot Kar	Devar	Roshan (music director)	Mukesh (singer)
Maine Shayad Tumhen, Pahle Bhi Kahin Dekha Hai	Barsaat Ki Raat	Roshan (music director)	Mohammed Rafi
Vikal Mora Manva, Tum Bin Hai	Mamta (1966 film)	Roshan (music director)	Lata Mangeshkar
Apni Kaho Kuchh Meri Suno, Kya Dil Ka Lagana Bhul Gaye	Parchhain	C. Ramchandra	Lata Mangeshkar & Talat Mahmood
Dheere Se Aaja Ri Akhiyan Mein Nindiya Men	Albela (1951 film)	C. Ramchandra	Lata Mangeshkar
Naina Kahe Ko Lagaye	Joru Ka Bhai	Jaidev	Asha Bhosle
Chandan Ka Palna Resham Ki Dori	Shabaab (film)	Naushad	Hemant Kumar
Dhoondho Dhoondho Re Saajna	Gunga Jumna	Naushad	Lata Mangeshkar
Hai Hai Rasiya Tu Bada Bedardi	Dil Diya Dard Liya	Naushad	Asha Bhosle
Jhule Mein Pavan Ki Ayi Bahar	Baiju Bawra (film)	Naushad	Lata Mangeshkar & Mohammed Rafi
Mera Pyar Bhi Tu Hai Yeh Bahar Bhi Tu Hai	Saathi (1968 film)	Naushad	Lata Mangeshkar & Mukesh (singer)
More Sainya Ji Utarenge Paar Nadiya Dhire Baho	Uran Khatola (film)	Naushad	Lata Mangeshkar & Chorus
Na Manu Na Manu Dagabjaaz Tori Batiya Na Manu Re	Gunga Jumna	Naushad	Lata Mangeshkar
Pyari Dulhaniya	Mother India	Naushad	Shamshad Begum
Paa Laagoon Kar Jori Re	Aap Ki Sewa Mein	Datta Davjekar	Lata Mangeshkar
Mat Maro Shyam Pichkari	Durgesh Nandani	Hemant Kumar	Lata Mangeshkar
Na Jao Saiyan Chhuda Ke Baiyan	Sahib Bibi Aur Ghulam	Hemant Kumar	Geeta Dutt
Badi Der Bhai Kab Loge Khabar	Basant Bahar (film)	Shankar–Jaikishan	Mohammed Rafi
Banwari Re Jeene Ka Sahara	Ek Phool Char Kante	Shankar–Jaikishan	Lata Mangeshkar
Din Sara Guzara Tore Angana	Junglee (1961 film)	Shankar–Jaikishan	Lata Mangeshkar & Mohammed Rafi
Din Sara Guzara Tore Angana	New Delhi (1956 film)	Shankar–Jaikishan	Lata Mangeshkar
Sur Na Saje Kya Gaon Main	Basant Bahar (film)	Shankar–Jaikishan	Manna Dey
Maine Rang Li Aaj Chunariya Sajana Tore Rang Me	Dulhan Ek Raat Ki	Madan Mohan (composer)	Lata Mangeshkar
Jaiye Aap Kahan Jayenge	Mere Sanam	O. P. Nayyar	Asha Bhosle
Kabhi Aar Kabhi Paar	Aar Paar	O. P. Nayyar	Shamshad Begum
Kaisa Jadoo Balama Tune	12 O'Clock (film)	O. P. Nayyar	Geeta Dutt
Main Soya Ankhian Meeche	Phagun (1958 film)	O. P. Nayyar	Asha Bhosle & Mohammed Rafi
Main Soya Ankhian Meeche	Phagun (1958 film)	O. P. Nayyar	Asha Bhosle & Mohammed Rafi
Ai Meri Johara Zabeen, Tujhe Maaloom Nahin	Waqt (1965 film)	Ravi (composer)	Manna Dey
Na Jhatko Zulf Se Pani	Shehnai (1964 film)	Ravi (composer)	Mohammed Rafi
More Kaanha Jo Aaye Palat Ke	Sardari Begum	Vanraj Bhatia	Arati Ankalikar-Tikekar
Tere Pyar Ka	Dhool Ka Phool	Datta Naik	Lata Mangeshkar & Mahendra Kapoor
Chura Liya Hai Tumne Jo Dil Ko	Yaadon Ki Baaraat	R. D. Burman	Mohammed Rafi & Asha Bhosle
Tu Jo Mere Sur Men	Chitchor	Ravindra Jain	K. J. Yesudas
De De Pyar De	Sharaabi	Bappi Lahiri	Kishore Kumar
Mainu Ishq Da Lag Gaya Rog	Dil Hai Ke Manta Nahin	Nadeem–Shravan	Anuradha Paudwal

== Private Album ==
=== Language : Telugu ===
Song	Movie	Composer	Singers	
Ramate Yamuna Pulinavane	Private Album	Jayadeva	Ghantasala	Ghantasala
