= Guide (film) =

1965 Indian film by Vijay Anand

- Theatrical release poster
- Directed by: Vijay Anand
- Screenplay by: Vijay Anand
- Dialogues by: Vijay Anand
- Story by: R. K. Narayan
- Based on: The Guide by R. K. Narayan
- Produced by: Dev Anand
- Starring: Dev Anand; Waheeda Rehman
- Cinematography: Fali Mistry
- Edited by: Vijay Anand; Babu Sheikh
- Music by: S. D. Burman
- Production company: Navketan Films
- Release dates: February 1965 (United States); 2 April 1966 (India)
- Running time: 183 minutes (Hindi), 120 minutes (English)
- Countries: India; United States
- Languages: Hindi; English
- Budget: ₹6 million

Guide (titled as The Guide in the English version) is a 1965 Indian bilingual romantic drama film directed by Vijay Anand and produced by Dev Anand, who co-starred in the film with Waheeda Rehman. Based on R. K. Narayan's 1958 novel The Guide, the film narrates the story of Raju (Anand), a freelance tour guide and Rosie (Rehman), the repressed wife of a wealthy archaeologist.

A 120-minute U.S. version titled The Guide was written by Pearl S. Buck and directed and produced by Tad Danielewski. For the US version, Dev Anand had insisted that Waheeda Rehman be cast as a heroine, but his advice was not heeded. The film was then screened again at the 2007 Cannes Film Festival, 42 years after its release.

Guide was a highly successful film at the box-office upon release.

At the 14th Filmfare Awards, Guide received a leading nine nominations, including Best Music Director (Burman) and Best Playback Singer (Lata Mangeshkar for "Aaj Phir Jeene Ki Tamanna Hai"), and won a leading 7 awards, including a sweep in the 4 major categories (Best Film, Best Director (Vijay), Best Actor (Dev), and Best Actress (Rehman), thus becoming the first film in the history of Filmfare Awards to do so. It was also selected as India's official entry for the Best Foreign Language Film at the 38th Academy Awards, but it was not accepted as a nominee. In 2012, Time magazine listed it at #4 on its list of "Best Bollywood Classics".

== Plot ==
Raju (Dev Anand), is a freelance guide, who earns his living by taking tourists to historic sites. The movie starts with Raju being released from jail, and then the story unfolds in a series of flashbacks. One day, a wealthy and aging archaeologist named Marco arrives in the city with his young wife Rosie (Waheeda Rehman), who is the daughter of a courtesan. Marco wants to do some research on the caves outside the city and hires Raju as his guide. He discovers a new cave and ignores Rosie.

While Marco devotes himself to the discovery of the cave, Raju takes Rosie on a tour and appreciates her dancing ability and innocence. He learns about Rosie's background as a daughter of a prostitute and how Rosie has achieved respectability as Marco's wife but at a terrible cost. She has had to give up her passion of dancing since it is unacceptable to Marco. Meanwhile, Rosie tries to commit suicide by consuming poison. Marco, upon discovering the incident, returns from the caves to see Rosie and gets furious on Rosie after seeing her alive. He tells Rosie that her act of committing suicide was a drama, otherwise she would have consumed more sleeping pills so that she could really have died. On returning to Caves which were discovered, Rosie learns that Marco is spending time and enjoying the company of a native tribal girl. Rosie is mad at Marco and both indulge in a serious heated discussion and then Rosie leaves the caves, and again wants to end her life. But Raju calms her by saying that committing suicide is a sin, and that she should live to pursue her dream. She finally says good-bye to the relation of being the wife of Marco. But now she needs support and a place to live. It is here that Raju takes her to his home.

Rosie is considered a prostitute too, by Raju's community (as classical dancing traditionally was related with prostitute at Royal court) which leads to many problems including his mother and her brother insisting that Rosie be kicked out. Raju refuses and his mother leaves him. His friend and driver also falls out with him over Rosie. Raju loses his business and the entire town turns against him. Undeterred by these setbacks, Raju helps Rosie embark on a singing and dancing career and Rosie becomes a star. As she rises as a star, Raju becomes dissolute—gambling and drinking. Marco comes back on the scene. Trying to win Rosie back, he brings flowers and has his agent ask Rosie to release some jewelry which is in a safe deposit box. Raju, a bit jealous, does not want Marco to have contact with Rosie and forges Rosie's name on the release of the jewels. Meanwhile Rosie and Raju drift apart due to Rosie's incomprehensible behaviour when she tortures Raju by not obliging him a caring hug even and asks him to leave her room else she says she will have to go out. Before this they also had a discussion about how a man should live when Rosie remembers Marco and tells Raju that Marco was probably correct when he used to say that a Man should not live on a woman's earnings.Raju retorts by saying that she is under a misunderstanding that she has become a star on her own and this was Raju's efforts which has helped her a lot in becoming a star. Then later Rosie learns of the forgery release. Raju is convicted of forgery, resulting in a two year sentence. Rosie does not understand why Raju indulged in forgery. It was not money, it was the loving fascination for Rosie which urged Raju not to reveal Marco's visit to Rosie so that she doesn't remember him again and to eliminate the probability of Rosie and Marco's togetherness, if at all, there was any little chance even. On the day of his release, his mother and Rosie come to pick him up but they are told that he was released six months ago because of his good behaviour.

Upon his release Raju wanders alone. Despair, poverty, rags, hunger, loneliness engulf him until he finds a wandering group of sadhus (holy men) with whom he spends a night at a derelict temple in a small town. He sleeps and one of the itinerant holy men places a shawl upon him while he sleeps. The holy men leave. The next morning, a farmer (Bhola) finds Raju sleeping under the orange shawl. Bhola thinks Raju is a holy man. Bhola is having a problem with his sister because she refuses to marry. Raju impresses upon the woman the logic in taking a husband and she submits, which convinces Bhola that Raju is a swami (holy man). Impressed by this Bhola spreads the news through village. Raju is taken as the holy man for the village. The farmers bring gifts for him and start consulting him with their problems. Raju assumes the role of village holy man (Swami Ji) and engages in skirmishes with the local pandits. In telling a childhood story, Raju speaks of a holy man whose 12 day fast resulted in God's bringing rain to end a drought.

A drought and ensuing famine hit the region hard. Through miscommunication of a village fool, Raju's (Swami Ji) words are interpreted by villagers that he will fast for 12 days to end the drought. He finds himself trapped by villagers' belief. At first Raju opposes the idea, going as far as telling Bhola that he is just a human like any one of them and even worse a convict who has undergone trial and served a jail sentence over a woman. But even the confession was not enough for the villagers to give up on their belief who quote the story of dacoit Ratnakar who became Valmiki. He reluctantly begins the fast, although he does not believe that there is any relation between a man's hunger and rain. With the fast, Raju undergoes a spiritual transformation. As the fast goes on, his fame spreads. People by the thousands come to see him and take his blessings. An American journalist asks him whether he truly believes that his fast would bring rain, he smiles and says "These people have faith in me, and I have faith in their faith". Upon hearing his fame Rosie pays him a visit, so does his mother and his friend Gaffoor, who is Muslim. Bhola does not allow him to enter the temple on the grounds that he is of a different religion. Raju comes out and asks Bhola what is his religion. He tells Bhola that humanity, love and helping the others is his religion. Then Bhola begs excuse and sees them hugging each other sentimentally and his eyes becomes wet. Raju understands that he now has everything he has lost a long time back. His health starts falling, and he thinks about the meaning of his life. On one side there is Rosie, his Mother and a chance to get back to his past life and on the other side there is a noble cause to fast and hope for the rain. He gets enlightened by the concept that his past sins are washed away by his anguish and the Guide Raju he knew has died. And now the only thing that remains is the spiritual Raju, which is indestructible. He is reconciled with his mother, Rosie and the driver during his ordeal. He transcends this life. Amidst thunder clap and heavy downpour, his soul departs this earth while the crowd rejoices and his beloveds cry. The climax also teaches the Bhagavad Gita's principles: "Man does not die it is only body which dies. Soul remains for ever."

== Cast ==
- Dev Anand as Raju
- Waheeda Rehman as Rosie Marco / Miss Nalini
- Leela Chitnis as Raju's Mother
- Kishore Sahu as Marco
- Gajanan Jagirdar as Bhola
- Praveen Paul as Bhola's wife
- Anwar Hussain as Gaffoor
- Rashid Khan as Joseph
- Ram Avtar as Pandit (well-built one)
- Narbada Shankar as a pandit
- M Usman Malik as Malik bhai
- Nazir Kashmiri as a villager

== Production ==
Dev Anand was approached by American director Tad Danielewski and writer Pearl S. Buck for an American film based on the 1958 novel The Guide by R. K. Narayan. Anand declined at first, but agreed to collaborate with Danielewski when he met him again at the 1962 Berlin Film Festival. Anand read the novel and contacted Buck, who invited him to the United States to discuss the project. Anand then reached out to Narayan to procure the rights to the book. The Indian and American production teams clashed, causing Anand to postpone the Hindi version, thereby freeing Chetan Anand to direct the highly-acclaimed war drama Haqeeqat (1964).

Raj Khosla was set to direct the Hindi version, with Waheeda Rehman being the first choice to play the role of Rosie. However, Rehman did not wish to work with Khosla following a misunderstanding between the two on the sets of Solva Saal (1958). Anand then approached Saira Banu to play Rosie, who declined. Vyjayanthimala was then considered, but was rejected by Danielewski. Khosla then stepped away the project, thereby enabling the inclusion of Waheeda Rehman, who had been lobbying for the role (and Khosla's exit) from behind-the-scenes. His exit also presenting an opportunity for Anand's own brother, Vijay Anand, to step in. The film would prove to be a landmark achievement in the careers of both the Anand brothers and also of Waheeda Rehman.

The sequence featuring the song "Aaj Phir Jeene Ki Tamanna Hai" was shot in the Chittor Fort in Rajasthan. The film's climax was shot in the town of Limbdi, located 90 km away from Ahmedabad on the banks of the river Bhogavo.

== Music ==
Guide

Soundtrack album by Sachin Dev Burman
- Released: 1965 (India)
- Recorded: 1964
- Genre: Film soundtrack
- Length: 38:01
- Label: The Gramophone Company of India (Private) Limited
- Producer: Sachin Dev Burman

Sachin Dev Burman chronology
Ziddi (1964)	Guide (1965)	Teen Devian (1965)

The film's music and background score was composed by Sachin Dev Burman, written by Shailendra and sung by Kishore Kumar, Mohammed Rafi, Lata Mangeshkar, Manna Dey and Sachin Dev Burman. The soundtrack was listed as #1 on Film Companion's list of Top 100 Bollywood Albums. In a poll of 30 leading composers, lyricists and singers conducted by Outlook India Magazine to determine the 20 best Hindi Film songs ever, three songs from the film made the list.

Song	Singer(s)	Lyricists	Raga	Picturized on
"Aaj Phir Jeene Ki Tamanna Hai"	Lata Mangeshkar	Shailendra		Dev Anand & Waheeda Rehman
"Gaata Rahe Mera Dil"	Kishore Kumar & Lata Mangeshkar	Shailendra		Dev Anand & Waheeda Rehman
"Din Dhal Jaaye"	Mohammed Rafi	Shailendra	Khamaj	Dev Anand & Waheeda Rehman
"Kya Se Kya Ho Gaya"	Mohammed Rafi	Shailendra	Khamaj	Dev Anand & Waheeda Rehman
"Piya Tose Naina Laage Re"	Lata Mangeshkar	Shailendra	Khamaj	Waheeda Rehman
"Saiyaan Beimaan"	Lata Mangeshkar	Shailendra	Jhinjhoti	Dev Anand & Waheeda Rehman
"Tere Mere Sapne"	Mohammed Rafi	Shailendra	Gara (raga)	Dev Anand & Waheeda Rehman
"Wahan Kaun Hai Tera"	S. D. Burman	Shailendra	Pahadi	Dev Anand
"He Ram Hamare Ramchandra"	Manna Dey & Chorus	Shailendra		Dev Anand
"Allah Megh De Paani De"	Sachin Dev Burman	Shailendra	Pilu (raga)	Dev Anand

Rafi had originally recorded a song called "Hum Hi Mein Thi Na Koi Baat, Yaad Na Tumko Aa Sake, Tumne Hume Bhula Diya, Hum Na Tumko Bhula Sake", but later this song was replaced by "Din Dhal Jaaye".

In the song "Mo Se Chal Kiye Jaaye", the tabla is played by renowned musician Pandit Shivkumar Sharma.

== Reception ==
Author R. K. Narayan disliked the film adaptation of his novel. Reviewing the English version of the film for the magazine Life, he called it "The Misguided Guide."

In a review of the American release in The New York Times, critic Bosley Crowther praised the cinematography as "... a succession of colorful views of sightseeing spots, busy cities, temples, dusty landscapes and crowds," but lamented that "... the development of the narrative continuity is so erratic and frequently slurred–so clumsy and artless, to be plain-spoken–that both story and emotion are vague."

== Accolades ==
The film was selected as the India's official entry for the Best Foreign Language Film at the 38th Academy Awards, but was not accepted as a nominee.

At the 14th Filmfare Awards, Guide received a leading 9 nominations, and won 7 awards, becoming the most-awarded film at the ceremony. Guide was also the first film to win all 4 major awards: Best Film, Best Director, Best Actor and Best Actress.

The ceremony also proved to be controversial, as S. D. Burman, who was nominated for Best Music Director and Lata Mangeshkar, who was nominated for Best Playback Singer for "Aaj Phir Jeene Ki Tamanna Hai", both lost their respective awards to Shankar-Jaikishan and Mohammed Rafi (for "Baharon Phool Barsao"), both for Suraj, despite being highly favored for winning in their respective categories.

Year	Award	Category	Recipient	Result
1967	Bengal Film Journalists' Association Awards	Best Music Director (Hindi)	S. D. Burman	Won
1965	Chicago International Film Festival	Gold Hugo	Vijay Anand	Nominated
1965	Chicago International Film Festival	Best Actress	Waheeda Rehman	Won
1967	Filmfare Awards	Best Film	Dev Anand	Won
1967	Filmfare Awards	Best Director	Vijay Anand	Won
1967	Filmfare Awards	Best Actor	Dev Anand	Won
1967	Filmfare Awards	Best Actress	Waheeda Rehman	Won
1967	Filmfare Awards	Best Music Director	S. D. Burman	Nominated
1967	Filmfare Awards	Best Playback Singer	Lata Mangeshkar for "Aaj Phir Jeene Ki Tamanna Hai"	Nominated
1967	Filmfare Awards	Best Story	R. K. Narayan	Won
1967	Filmfare Awards	Best Dialogue	Vijay Anand	Won
1967	Filmfare Awards	Best Cinematography (Color)	Fali Mistry	Won

== See also ==
- List of submissions to the 38th Academy Awards for Best Foreign Language Film
- List of Indian submissions for the Academy Award for Best Foreign Language Film

== Trivia ==
Dev Anand had invested every penny he had at that time in the making of this film. Yet, initially Dev Anand could not find any distributor for Guide, mainly because the US version had already flopped.

In the Guide, Raju, lately released from jail after a 2-year prison sentence for cheque fraud spends a night at a derelict temple. He is mistaken for a holy man by the villagers and is forced by the circumstance to assume the role of the village holy man. In the Malayalam short film, Thattumporathappan (Lord of the Attic) by Sudevan, a man fleeing a communal riot hides in the attic of an old house. He pretends to be the god of the attic, to survive. The following night he escapes from the house but a local deity comes into being as a result of the man’s desperate act of survival. Both Guide and Thattumporathappan examine the theme of mistaken or assumed spiritual identities.

== Bibliography ==
- The Guide (Modern Classics). Penguin Books. 2010. ISBN 978-0-14-341498-8.
