= Gara (raga) =

Raga Gara
- Thaat: This raga is in the Khamaj Thaat; Some consider Gara in the Kafi Thaat.
- Type: Sampurna - Sampurna
- Time of day: 6 pm / 9 pm - late evening
- Arohana: S G (komal) m P D N S
- Avarohana: S N D P m G (komal) S
- Pakad: R g R S D n P D N S G M R g R
- Chalan: R g R S D n P D N S G M R g R
- Vadi: Ga
- Samavadi: Ni
- Similar: Piloo, Jaijaiwanti

Gara is a Hindustani classical raga belonging to the Khamaj Thaat. This raga is similar to raga Jaijaiwanti. Both ragas i.e. raga Jaijaiwanti and raga Gara, have the same svaras. Gara is a rare raga. It is rendered in the late evening. The raga uses all the seven notes, six in the ascent and seven in the descent. Therefore, the Jati of the raga is Shaadav-Sampurna. While some say that seven svaras are played in the ascent and seven in the descent. Therefore, the Jati then becomes Sampurna-Sampurna. It uses both, the Komal (flat) and Shuddha (full) Nishad, komal Ga, and all other notes are Shuddha (full). The derivative ragas out of this structure are grouped under the broad head of Khamaj Thaat. Gara belongs to a family of melodic entities, which were apparently derived from folk melodies, and entered art-music in association with the thumri genre. This family includes ragas like Kafi, Pilu, Jangula, Barwa, and Zilla, along with several others. This raga expresses the feeling of happiness and satisfaction of achievement, however it simultaneously conveys the sadness of losing. This raga is also a vivacious and romantic one.

== Composition ==
Raga Jaijaiwanti bears the closest resemblance to Gara. However, some also believe that raga Gara is a combination of Khamaj, Piloo and Jhinjhoti. The raga belongs to the Khamaj parent scale, and is characterised by a notional scale-base at Pa of the lower octave, rather than the customary Sa. Sometimes it is considered to be in the Kafi parent scale too. The types of raga Gara can be separated by one, the bright Gara (which gravitates more towards Khamaj thaat and maybe a little into the Bilaval Thaat) from the more somber Gara which is the other type, which gets more into Kafi thaat and even Piloo-ang. Raga Gara can also be influenced by certain ragas like, raga Maand or even raga Bhinna Shadja, raga Pancham se Gara, raga Pahadi, raga Piloo, raga Sindura, raga Zilla and raga Manjh Khamaj in terms of playing Thumris or Bhajans (Semi-classical music). But this doesn't include the Raga Vistar (aalap) or Khyal Gayaki (Classical music) because a ragas original composition and structure doesn't change in the raga vistar. This factor may change in the semi-classical forms of any raga.

Aarohana

S G (komal) m P D N S

Avaroha

S N D P m G (komal) S

Pakad / Chalan

R g R S D n P D N S G (komal) M R g R

Vadi

Ga

Samavadi

Ni

== List of Film songs ==
Song	Movie	Composer	Artists
Aise To Na Dekho	Teen Devian	S. D. Burman	Mohammed Rafi
Tere Mere Sapne Ab Ek Rang Hain	Guide (film)	S. D. Burman	Mohammed Rafi
Jivan Men Piya Tera Sath Rahe	Goonj Uthi Shehnai	Vasant Desai	Mohammed Rafi & Lata Mangeshkar
Kabhi Khud Pe Kabhi Haalaath Pe Ronaa Aayaa	Hum Dono (1961 film)	Jaidev	Mohammed Rafi
Mohe Panghat Pe Nandalal Ched Gayo Re	Mughal-e-Azam	Naushad	Lata Mangeshkar
Hamsafar Saath Apna Chhod Chale	Aakhri Daao(1958 film)	Madan Mohan (composer)	Mohammed Rafi & Asha Bhosle
Unke Khayal Aye To Ate Chale Gaye	Lal Patthar	Shankar–Jaikishan	Mohammed Rafi
Diwana Kahe Ke Aaj Mujhe Phir Pukariye	Mulzim (1963 film)	Ravi (composer)	Mohammed Rafi

== Songs in Raga Gara with Video Links ==
(The references of all songs that are given below are -)

Aise To Na Dekho
Film - Teen Deviyan
Year - 1965
Raga - Gara
Tala - Dadra
Music Director - S. D. Burman
Singer - Mohd. Rafi
Video link - https://www.youtube.com/watch?v=OaginwwacJI

Diwana Kahe Ke Aaj Mujhe Phir Pukariye
Film - Mulzim
Year -1963
Raga - Gara
Tala - Dadra
Music Director - Ravi
Singer - Mohd. Rafi
Video link - https://www.youtube.com/watch?v=TDuQcRX6hXg

Hamsafar Saath Apna Chhod Chale
Film - Aakhri Daao
Year -1958
Raga - Gara
Tala - Dadra
Music Director - Madan Mohan
Singer - Mohd. Rafi, Asha Bhosle
Video link - https://www.youtube.com/watch?v=OIZaLYIfPXg

Tere Mere Sapne Ab Ek Rang Hain
Film - Guide
Year - 1965
Raga - Gara
Tala - Dadra
Music Director - S.D. Burman
Singer - Mohd. Rafi
Video link - https://www.youtube.com/watch?v=ngch5NKgPh8

Jivan Mein Piya Tera Sath Rahe
Film - Gunj Uthi Shehnai
Year - 1959
Raga - Gara
Tala - Kaherava
Music Director - Vasant Desai
Singers - Lata Mangeshkar, Mohd. Rafi
Video link - https://www.youtube.com/watch?v=10c6TeWZmVE

Kabhi Khud Pe Kabhi Haalaath Pe Ronaa Aayaa
Film - Hum Dono
Year - 1961
Raga - Gara
Tala - Dadra
Music Director - Jaidev
Singer - Mohd. Rafi
Video link - https://www.youtube.com/watch?v=CzpHlGxDzqE

Mohe Panghat Pe Nandalal Ched Gayo Re
Film - Mughal-e-Azam
Year - 1960
Raga - Gara
Tala - Dadra
Music Director - Naushad
Singer - Lata Mangeshkar
Video link - https://www.youtube.com/watch?v=H4y8tXUlJjA

Unnai Kaanadhu naan
Language - Tamil
Movie    - Vishwaroopam
Raga     - Gara
Year     - 2013
Composer - Shankar-Ehsaan-Loy
 Vocal   - Shankar Mahadevan & Kamal Haasan

Raghupati Raghava Raja Ram
Raga - Gara
Composer - Tulsidas or Ramdas
Tuned by - Vishnu Digambar Paluskar
Popularised by Mahatma Gandhi

 Chanthu Thottile
 Film     - Banaras
 Language - Malayalam 
 Year     - 2009
 Raga     - Mishra Gara
           with touches of Malhar
 Composer - M Jayachandran
 Lyricist - Gireesh Puttenchery
 Vocal    - Shreya Ghoshal

== See also ==
- Jaijaiwanti
- Pilu
- Khamaj
- Jhinjhoti
