= Kairasi =

1960 film by K. Shankar

- Theatrical release poster
- Directed by: K. Shankar
- Story by: Kothamangalam Sadanandan
- Produced by: N. Vasudeva Menon
- Starring: Gemini Ganesh; B. Saroja Devi
- Cinematography: Thambu
- Edited by: K. Shankar; K. Narayanan
- Music by: R. Govardhanam
- Production company: Vasu Films
- Distributed by: Solar Film Distributors
- Release date: 19 October 1960
- Running time: 163 minutes
- Country: India
- Language: Tamil

Kairasi (transl. Auspicious hands) is a 1960 Indian Tamil-language film directed by K. Shankar and produced by N. Vasudeva Menon. The film stars Gemini Ganesan (credited as Ganesh) and B. Saroja Devi. The plot revolves around a doctor whose father is wrongfully convicted.

Kairasi was released on 19 October 1960, during Diwali, and became a commercial success. It was later remade in Hindi as Jhoola (1962).

== Plot ==
Sundaram, an honest police constable, is falsely accused of murder and imprisoned. Ramanathan, a judge, adopts Sundaram's son, Mohan, who later becomes a successful doctor.

== Cast ==
Male cast

- Gemini Ganesh as Mohan
- K. A. Thangavelu as Madhu
- M. R. Radha as Kumar
- S. V. Sahasranamam as Sundaram
- K. D. Santhanam as Judge Ramanathan
- S. Rama Rao as Emperuman
- C. S. Pandiyan as Somu
- P. D. Sambandam as Sambandam
- V. P. S. Mani as Sekar
- K. Natarajan as Dr. Sankar
- G. K. Pillai as Sub-Inspector

Male supporting cast

- Mahalingam, Karikol Rajoo, Rathnam,
  Balakrishnan, V. T. Kalyanam, and Maruthappa.

Female cast

- B. Saroja Devi as Sumathi
- M. V. Rajamma as Lakshmi
- K. Malathi as Kanagam
- Mohana as Gokila
- Ramani as Susheela
- Chellam as Chellam
- Pushpamala as Angamuthu

Female supporting cast

- Seethalakshmi, Ramamani Bai, Santha Kumari, and Baby Mangalam.

== Production ==
Kairasi was directed by K. Shankar, who also served as the editor. It was produced by N. Vasudeva Menon under the banner of Vasu Films, marking his second venture as producer. The story was written by Kothamangalam Sadanandan, with dialogues written by K. S. Gopalakrishnan and K. D. Santhanam. Santhanam also appeared onscreen as a judge. Cinematography was handled by Thambu, with K. Narayanan co-editeding the film, while A. Balu served as the art director. The final cut of the film had a runtime of 163 minutes.

== Soundtrack ==
The music for Kairasi was composed by R. Govardhanam, with lyrics penned by Kannadasan, Kothamangalam Subbu and K. S. Gopalakrishnan. Music historian Vamanan noted that Kairasi "brought out the best in Govardhanam, with its limpid melodies brimming forth sweetly with lyrical intimations of love and romance."

Song	Singers	Lyrics	Length
"Anaithum Andavan Kairasi"	Sirkazhi Govindarajan	Kothamangalam Subbu	03:06
"Paalilum Thaenilum Suvaiyedhu"	P. Susheela, T. S. Bagavathi	Kannadasan	05:22
"Oorumillai Naattile"	P. Susheela	Kannadasan	
"Kaadhal Enum Aatrinile"	T. M. Soundararajan, P. Susheela	Kannadasan	02:42
"Sendaattam Chinna Ponnu"	P. Susheela, Kamala & Group	Kannadasan	
"Anbulla Athaan Vanakkam"	P. Susheela	Kannadasan	03:49
"Kannum Kannum Pesiyadhum"	T. M. Soundararajan, P. Susheela	Kannadasan	06.22
"Kaathirunden Kaathirunden"	P. Susheela	Kannadasan	03:04
"Poologam Maarinaalum"	S. C. Krishnan, L. R. Eswari	K. S. Gopalakrishnan	

== Release and reception ==
Kairasi was released on 19 October 1960, coinciding with the Diwali festival. It was distributed by Solar Film Distributors in Madras and other distributors across various districts in Tamil Nadu. The Indian Express gave a positive review, commenting on the performances of Ganesh, Rajamma, Sahasranamam and Radha, as well as the songs written by Kannadasan and the title track written by Subbu. Despite facing competition from Mannathi Mannan, Petra Manam and Paavai Vilakku, which released on the same day, the film emerged as a commercial success.
