= Kirwani =

Musical scale in Hindustani classical music

- Equivalent: harmonic minor
- Similar: Pilu

Kirwani is a raga in Hindustani classical music. It is an specially suited for instrumental music. Its scale is the same as the harmonic minor in western music. There are shades of Pilu in Kirwani. This raga is said to have been borrowed from the Carnatic music raga Keeravani.

== Arohana & Avarohana ==
The swaras used in this raga are:

Arohana : S R g M P d N S'
Thus: C D E-flat F G A-flat B c

Avarohana : S' N d P M g R S

== Vadi & Samavadi ==
There is no strict Vadi-Samavadi, but Re, ga, pa and dha are important.

== Pakad or Chalan ==
d- P- g R-- S R---, R-- g M P d P

== Organization & Relationships ==
Related ragas: Pilu

Thaat: Kirwani cannot be fit into one of Bhatkhande's thaats;. Bhatkhande himself did not list it as such.

== Time Of Singing ==
=== Samay (Time) ===
Madhyaratri (midnight)

== Historical Information ==
It is "recently" taken from the musical scale Keeravani of South Indian classical music (Carnatic music). It is similar to an ancient version of Pilu

== Tamil Film Songs ==
Song	Movie	Year	Composer	Singer
Paattu Padava	Then Nilavu	1961	A. M. Rajah	A. M. Rajah
Oho Endhan Baby	Then Nilavu	1961	A. M. Rajah	A. M. Rajah, S. Janaki
Samarasam Ulaavum Idame	Rambaiyin Kaadhal	1956	T. R. Pappa	Seerkazhi Govindarajan
Aasaiyae Alaipolae	Thai Pirandhal Vazhi Pirakkum	1958	K. V. Mahadevan	Thiruchi Loganathan
Avala Sonnal	Selvam	1966	K. V. Mahadevan	T. M. Soundararajan
Kunguma Poove Konjum Puraave	Maragatham	1959	S. M. Subbaiah Naidu	J. P. Chandrababu, K. Jamuna Rani
Buddhiyulla Manitharellam	Annai	1962	R. Sudarsanam	J. P. Chandrababu
Kannale Pesi Pesi Kolladhe	Adutha Veettu Penn	1960	Adi Narayana Rao	P. B. Sreenivas
Yaar Sirithal Enna	Idhayathil Nee	1963	Viswanathan–Ramamoorthy	P. B. Sreenivas
Manavane Azhalaama	Karpagam	1963	Viswanathan–Ramamoorthy	P. Susheela
Kangal Irandum Unnai	Mannadhi Mannan	1960	Viswanathan–Ramamoorthy	P. Susheela
Avala Ivala	Mannadhi Mannan	1960	Viswanathan–Ramamoorthy	L. R. Eswari, L. R. Anjali
Anubhavam Pudhumai	Kadhalikka Neramillai	1964	Viswanathan–Ramamoorthy	P. B. Sreenivas, P. Susheela
Kannirendum Minna Minna	Aandavan Kattalai	1964	Viswanathan–Ramamoorthy	P. B. Sreenivas, L. R. Eswari
Velli Kinnamthan	Uyarndha Manithan	1968	M. S. Viswanathan	T. M. Soundararajan, P. Susheela
Thaayir Chirandha	Agathiyar	1972	Kunnakudi Vaidyanathan	T. K. Kala
Thanga Sangili	Thooral Ninnu Pochchu	1982	Illayaraja	Malaysia Vasudevan, S. Janaki
Ada Machamulla	Chinna Veedu	1985	Illayaraja	S. P. Balasubrahmanyam, S. Janaki, S. P. Sailaja, T. V. Gopalakrishnan
Oorai Therinchikitten	Padikkadavan	1985	Illayaraja	K. J. Yesudas
Raja Raja Chozhan	Rettai Vaal Kuruvi	1987	Illayaraja	K. J. Yesudas
Kaatril Endhan Geedham	Johnny	1980	Illayaraja	S. Janaki
Kodiyile Malliyapoo	Kadalora Kavithaigal	1986	Illayaraja	P. Jayachandran, S. Janaki
Raasathi Manasule	Raasave Unnai Nambi	1988	Illayaraja	Mano, P. Susheela
Oh Papa Lali	Idhayathai Thirudathe	1989	Illayaraja	Mano
Poovoma Oorgolam	Chinna Thambi	1991	Illayaraja	S. P. Balasubrahmanyam, Swarnalatha
Ennai Thalaata	Kadhalukku Mariyadhai	1997	Illayaraja	Hariharan
Khajiraho Kanavilor	Oru Naal Oru Kanavu	2005	Illayaraja	Hariharan, Shreya Ghoshal
Keeravani Iraviley	Padum Paravaigal	1988	Illayaraja	S. P. Balasubrahmanyam, S. Janaki
Nenjukulle Innaarunnu	Ponnumani	1993	Illayaraja	S. P. Balasubrahmanyam, S. Janaki
Intha Maamanoda	Uthama Raasa	1993	Illayaraja	S. P. Balasubrahmanyam, S. Janaki
Ilavenil Ithu Vaikasi Matham	Kadhal Rojavae	2000	Illayaraja	S. P. Balasubrahmanyam, K. S. Chitra
Malaiyoram Veesum Kaatthu	Paadu Nilave	1987	Illayaraja	S. P. Balasubrahmanyam
Chinna Mani Kuyilae	Amman Kovil Kizhakale	1986	Illayaraja	S. P. Balasubrahmanyam
Mannil Indha	Keladi Kanmani	1990	Illayaraja	S. P. Balasubrahmanyam
Poongodithan Poothathamma	Idhayam	1991	Illayaraja	S. P. Balasubrahmanyam
Putham Pudhu Malare	Amaravathi	1993	Bala Bharathi	S. P. Balasubrahmanyam
Unnai Thotta Thendral	Thalaivasal	1992	Bala Bharathi	S. P. Balasubrahmanyam, K. S. Chitra
Kaadhal Kaadhal Kaadhal	Poochudava	1997	Sirpy	S. P. Balasubrahmanyam, K. S. Chitra
Kannalanae Yenathu	Bombay	1995	A. R. Rahman	K. S. Chithra
Ennai Kaanavillayae Nettrodu	Kadhal Desam	1996	A. R. Rahman	S. P. Balasubrahmanyam, O. S. Arun, Rafee
Vetri Kodi Kattu	Padayappa	1999	A. R. Rahman	Malaysia Vasudevan, Palakkad Sreeram
Evano Oruvan	Alaipayuthey	2000	A. R. Rahman	Swarnalatha
Manasukkul Oru Puyal	Star	2001	A. R. Rahman	S. P. Balasubrahmanyam, Sadhana Sargam
Machhakkari Machhakkari	Sillunu Oru Kaadhal	2006	A. R. Rahman	Shankar Mahadevan, Vasundhara Das
Arima Arima	Enthiran	2010	A. R. Rahman	Hariharan, Sadhana Sargam, Benny Dayal, Naresh Iyer
Neethanae	Mersal	2017	A. R. Rahman	A. R. Rahman, Shreya Ghoshal
Vaannum Mannum	Kaadhal Mannan	1998	Bharadwaj	Hariharan, K. S. Chithra
Anbae Anbae	Uyirodu Uyiraga	1998	Vidyasagar	Hariharan, K. S. Chithra
Adam Evaal	Priyam	1996	Vidyasagar	Mano, Devi
Malai Kattru Vandhu (Ragam Darbarikaanada touches)	Vedham	2001	Vidyasagar	Hariharan, Mahalakshmi Iyer
Kadhal Arimugama	Kadhal Kisu Kisu	2003	Vidyasagar	Vijay Prakash, Sujatha
Enakenna Perandhava	Kizhakku Karai	1991	Deva	S. P. Balasubrahmanyam, K. S. Chithra
Oru Kaditham	Deva	1995	Deva	S. P. Balasubrahmanyam, K. S. Chithra
O Ranganatha	Nesam	1997	Deva	S. P. Balasubrahmanyam, K. S. Chithra
Taj Mahal Ondru	Kannodu Kanbathellam	1999	Deva	Hariharan
Anbe En Anbe	Nenjinile	1999	Deva	Hariharan
Innisai Paadivarum	Thullatha Manamum Thullum	1999	S. A. Rajkumar	P. Unni Krishnan, K. S. Chithra
Ennavo Ennavo	Priyamaanavale	2000	S. A. Rajkumar	Hariharan, Mahalakshmi Iyer
Kadhal Vennila	Vaanathaippola	2000	S. A. Rajkumar	Hariharan, P. Jayachandran (Pathos)
Un Sirippinil	Pachaikili Muthucharam	2007	Harris Jayaraj	Sowmya Rao, Robby
Anbe En Anbe	Dhaam Dhoom	1997	Harris Jayaraj	Harish Raghavendra
Thodu Vaanam	Anegan	2015	Harris Jayaraj	Hariharan, Durga, Shakthisree Gopalan
Engengo Kaalgal Sellum	Nandhaa	2001	Yuvan Shankar Raja	Ilaiyaraaja
Theendi Theendi	Bala	2002	Yuvan Shankar Raja	P. Unnikrishnan, Sujatha Mohan
En Anbae En Anbae	Mounam Pesiyadhe	2002	Yuvan Shankar Raja	Shankar Mahadevan
Kan Pesum Varthaigal	7G Rainbow Colony	2004	Yuvan Shankar Raja	Karthik
Azhagaai Pookkuthey	Ninaithale Inikkum	2009	Vijay Antony	Janaki Iyer, Prasanna
Kavithaikal Sollava	Ullam Kollai Poguthae	2001	Karthik Raja	S. P. Balasubrahmanyam, Sujatha, Hariharan (Pathos)
Adiye Enna Raagam	Rummy	2014	D. Imman	Abhay Jodhpurkar, Poornima Satish
Ammadi Ammadi	Desingu Raja	2013	D. Imman	Shreya Ghoshal

== Literature ==
Bor, Joep (c. 1997), The Raga Guide, Charlottesville, Virginia: Nimbus Records, archived from the original on 2009-07-15
Jairazbhoy, N.A. (1995), The Rags of North Indian Music: Their Structure & Evolution, Bombay: Popular Prakashan.
Patwardham, Narayan Rao (1972), Tarala Prabandhavali, Rajasthan: Vanasthali Vidyapith.
Rao, B.Subba (1964–66), Raganidhi, Madras: Music Academy.
Ratanjankar, S.N., Abhinava Gita Manjari, Bombay: Popular Prakashan.
