= Petra Manam =

1960 film by A. Bhimsingh

- Theatrical release poster
- Directed by: A. Bhimsingh
- Story by: Mu. Varadarajan
- Starring: Sivaji Ganesan; Pushpavalli; S. S. Rajendran; Padmini Priyadarshini
- Cinematography: G. Vittal Rao
- Music by: S. Rajeswara Rao
- Production company: National Pictures
- Release date: 19 October 1960
- Country: India
- Language: Tamil

Petra Manam (transl. The Mother's Heart) is a 1960 Indian Tamil-language film directed by A. Bhimsingh and produced by National Pictures. The film stars Sivaji Ganesan, Pushpavalli, S. S. Rajendran and Padmini Priyadarshini. It is the Tamil version of the 1953 Telugu film Pempudu Koduku. The film was released on 19 July 1960.

== Cast ==
- Sivaji Ganesan
- Pushpavalli
- S. S. Rajendran
- M. N. Rajam
- S. V. Subbaiah
- L. Vijayalakshmi
- J. P. Chandrababu
- Padmini Priyadarshini

== Production ==
Petra Manam was produced by National Pictures, written by Mu. Varadarajan, and shot by G. Vittal Rao. It had choreography by K. N. Dhandayudha Pani, Pillai Thangappan and Muthusami Pillai. According to M. L. Narasimhan of The Hindu, it was simultaneously filmed in Telugu as Pempudu Koduku, despite the fact that there is a seven-year release gap between these two films; the latter was released in 1953.

== Soundtrack ==
The music was composed by S. Rajeswara Rao. The song "Sinthanai Seiyadaa" has somewhat similar tune of "Adha Hai Chandrama Raat Adhi" from Navrang (1959).

Song	Singer/s	Lyricist	Length
"Anbu Thozhaa Odi Vaa"	Sirkazhi Govindarajan	Ku. Mu. Annalthango	
"Puthiyathor Ulagam Seyvom"	Sirkazhi Govindarajan	Bharathidasan	03:14
"Paadi Paadi Paadi"	J. P. Chandrababu & Soolamangalam Rajalakshmi	Bharathidasan	06:27
"Manathirkukandha Mayile"	J. P. Chandrababu	Bharathidasan	
"Ore Oru Paisaa"	Soolamangalam Rajalakshmi	Bharathidasan	03:29
"Therku Podhigai Malai"	T. M. Soundararajan & K. Jamuna Rani	Bharathidasan	
"Vendaamai...Sinthanai Seiyadaa"	M. L. Vasanthakumari & Sivaji Ganesan (dialogues)	Kannadasan	06:05
"Kadhal Karumbu Kandaen"	C. S. Jayaraman & Jikki	Kannadasan	03:28
"Thulli Thulli Odum En"	Jikki	K. P. Kamatchisundaram	02:53
"Cinema Kinima Draama"	Sirkazhi Govindarajan	M. K. Athamanathan	
"Kanne Nee Sendru Vaadaa"	A. P. Komala	M. K. Athamanathan	03:06

== Release ==
Petra Manam was released on 19 October 1960, during Diwali. Facing competition from Kairasi, Paavai Vilakku and Mannathi Mannan, released on the same day, it fared averagely at box office.
