= Sharda (singer) =

Indian playback singer (1933–2023)

Background information
- Also known as: Shardha, Sharada
- Born: Sharada Iyengar; 25 October 1933; Madras Presidency, British India
- Died: 14 June 2023 (aged 89)
- Occupation: Playback singer
- Years active: 1965–1986, 2007

Sharda Rajan Iyengar (25 October 1933 – 14 June 2023), known professionally as Sharda, was an Indian playback singer most active in the 1960s and 1970s. She won the Filmfare Award for Best Female Playback Singer for the cabaret "Baat Zara Hai Aapas Ki" in Jahan Pyar Miley (1970), though she is most remembered for her song "Titli Udi" in Suraj (1966). In 2007, she released her album Andaaz-E-Bayan Aur, featuring her own compositions based on Mirza Ghalib's ghazals.

== Early life ==
Sharda was from an Iyengar family from Tamil Nadu, India and was inclined towards music from childhood. She graduated with a BA degree.

== Career ==
Early in her career Sharda was offered a voice test by Raj Kapoor when he first heard her singing at Shrichand Ahuja's residence in Tehran. She got her first big break in Bollywood with the song "Titli Udi" in Suraj (1966). She was promoted by Shankar of the Shankar Jaikishan duo.

"Titli udi" turned out to be a top chartbuster in 1966. It so happens that the coveted Filmfare award for best playback singer had only one category (either male or female) until 1966. "Titli Udi" song, however, was tied as best song with Mohd Rafi's song "Baharo Phool Barsao" which had never happened before. Sharda didn't win the award but from then on Filmfare started giving two awards for best playback singer: one for male singer and the other for female singer. Thus Sharda made history. Thereafter Sharda was nominated four years in a row (1968–71) for best female playback singer and won another Filmfare award. In a short span Sharda won two Filmfare awards, when the Mangeshkar Sisters were dominating. Thereafter she continued singing for Shankar in nearly all of his films until his death. Her voice was last heard in Kaanch Ki Deewar (1986).

She sang with singers such as Mohammed Rafi, Asha Bhosle, Kishore Kumar, Yesudas, Mukesh, and Suman Kalyanpur. She lent her voice to leading ladies of the time like Vyjayanthimala, Rajshree, Sadhana, Saira Banu, Hema Malini, Sharmila Tagore, Mumtaz, Rekha, and Helen. In addition to Shankar, she recorded songs with Usha Khanna, Ravi, Dattaram, Iqbal Qureshi, and others. She was the first Indian female singer to record her own pop album in India with Sizzlers, released in 1971 by His Master's Voice.

== Original music ==
On 21 July 2007 Sharda released her Ghazal album Andaaz-e-Bayan Aur, a compilation of Mirza Ghalib's ghazals. The album was released at Juhu Jagriti Mumbai at the hands of actress Shabana Azmi. Music Director Khayyam was present at the release party, where Sharda thrilled the audience by singing a few songs from the album.

Shankar composed "Ek Chehra jo Dil Ke Kareeb" for a film called Garam Khoon (1980) and sung by Lata Mangeshkar. The song was penned by Sharda under the name Singaar and picturised on Sulakshana Pandit.

In the mid-1970s she directed music for films like Maa Behen Aur Biwi, Tu Meri Main Tera, Kshitij, Mandir Masjid, and Maila Anchal. Mohd Rafi was nominated for Filmfare Best Male Playback Singer Award for the song "Achcha Hi Hua Dil Toot Gaya" from Maa Behen Aur Biwi (1974), which he sang under Sharda's music direction.

== Death ==
Sharda died on 14 June 2023, at the age of 89.

== Popular songs ==
- "Titli udi" (Suraj)
- "Dekho mera dil machal gaya" (Suraj)
- "Baat Zara Hai Aapas Ki" (Jahan Pyar Miley, 1970, Filmware Award Winner)
- "Aa Aayega kaun yahan" (Gumnaam)
- "Jaan e Chaman Shola badan" (Gumnaam) – with Mohd Rafi
- "Masti Aur Jawani Ho Umar Badi Mastani Ho" (Dil Daulat Duniya) – With Kishore Kumar & Asha Bhosle
- "Jigar ka dard badhta ja raha hai" (Street Singer) - with Mohd Rafi
- "Bakkamma-2 Bakkamma-2 Ekkada Potao Ra" (Shatranj) - with Mohd Rafi and Mehmood
- "Leja Leja Leja mera dil" (An Evening in Paris)
- "Chale jana zara thhahro" (Around The World) – with Mukesh
- "Tum Pyar se dekho" (Sapno Ka Saudagar) – with Mukesh
- "Duniya ki sair kar lo" (Around The World) - with Mukesh
- "Woh Pari kahan se laun" (Pehchan) – with Mukesh and Suman Kalyanpur
- "Kisike dil ko sanam" (Kal Aaj Aur Kal)
- "Jab bhi yeh dil udaas hota hai" (Seema) – with Mohd Rafi
- "Aap ki Rai Mere Baare Mein kya hai kahiye" (Elaan) – with Mohd Rafi
- "Jane Anjane Yahan sabhi hain Deewane" (Jane Anjane)
- "Jaane bhi De Sanam Mujhe, abhi jaane..." (Around the World)
- "Man ke panchhi kaheen duur chal, duur chal" ("Naina")
- "Wahi Pyar Ke Khuda Hum Jin Pe Fida" ( "Paapi Pet Ka Sawal Hai" 1984 )
- Tera ang ka rang hai anguri (Chanda aur Bijli)
- Yeh muh aur massur ki dhal (Around the world) with Mubarak Begum
- Humko tou barbad kiya hay aur kisey barbad karogey (Gunahon ka Devta 1967) - with Mohd. Rafi
- Sunn sunn re balam, dil tujhko pukarey (Pyar Mohabbat 1968)- with Mohd.Rafi
- "Disco Musical Stories" - 1988

=== Telugu songs ===
- "Kanti Choopu Cheputondi" (Jeevitha Chakram)
- “Madhurathi madhuram “(Jeevitha Chakram) - with Ghantasala
- “Kallallo Kallupetti Choodu “(Jeevitha Chakram) - with Ghantasala
