= Mannathi Mannan =

- Theatrical release poster
- Directed by: M. Natesan
- Story by: Kannadasan
- Produced by: M. Natesan
- Starring: M. G. Ramachandran; Anjali Devi; Padmini
- Cinematography: G. K. Ramu; C. J. Mohan
- Edited by: C. P. Jambulingam; S. Krishnamoorthy; Rajan
- Music by: Viswanathan–Ramamoorthy
- Production company: Natesh Art Pictures
- Release date: 19 October 1960
- Running time: 178 minutes
- Country: India
- Language: Tamil

Mannathi Mannan (pronounced [mannaːdi mannan] transl. King of Kings) is a 1960 Indian Tamil-language historical action film directed and produced by M. Natesan. The film stars M. G. Ramachandran, Anjali Devi and Padmini. It was released on 19 October 1960, during Diwali.

== Plot ==
Dancer Chitra and prince of Uraiyur Manivannan fall in love with each other after meeting in a dance competition. However, Chola King Kanikannan also desires Chitra. Meanwhile, Manivannan's father, the Cheran King sends his minister, seeking the hand of Karpagavalli, daughter of King Karigala, for his son. But the King thwarts this proposal, talking ill of the heredity of Manivannan's mother. Unable to bear his mother being insulted, Manivannan goes to the Chola kingdom and abducts Karpagavalli. In the meantime, a dacoit, played very cleverly by Kanikannan, forces Manivannan to marry Karpagavalli.

== Cast ==
Cast according to the opening credits of the film

Male Cast

- M. G. R. as Manivannan
- P. S. Veerappa as Kanikannan
- M. G. Chakrapani as Karikala Chozhan
- Kula Deivam V. R. Rajagopal as Balaraman
- N. S. Narayana Pillai
- Azhwar Kuppusami
- P. S. Venkatachalam
- R. M. Sethupathi
- Thirupathisami
- T. V. Sivanantham

Female Cast

- Anjali as Karpagavalli
- Padmini as Chithra
- Ragini
- G. Sakunthala as Mangayarkarasi
- Lakshmiprabha

Dance

- Lakshmi Rajyam, Rita, T. S. Jayanthi,
  T. S. Kamala, D. Madhuri, T. K. Rajeswari,
  Revathi, Sakunthala, C. R. Mohana, G. Bala,
  G. Sundari, Leela, N. Meera, B. Shantha,
  K. Rajeswari, Rajamma, Vittoba, J. N. Rajam,
  G. Kamala, Nagu and P. T. Saroja.

== Soundtrack ==
The music composed by Viswanathan–Ramamoorthy. The song "Aadatha Manamum" is based on Latangi raga. Among the 14 songs, the solo song by P. Susheela 'Kankal irandum enru unnai kandu pesuma', chiefly picturized on Padmini, with interspersed fighting scenes by MGR, and also clips of agony felt by Anjali Devi, has been acclaimed by Susheela's peers as well as the public as one of her best. It had stood the test of time, as one of the superbly tuned sad melody to appear in Tamil movies.

Song	Singers	Lyrics	Length
"Aadadha Manamum Undo"	T. M. Soundararajan & M. L. Vasanthakumari	A. Maruthakasi	03:59
"Aadum Mayile Azhagu Mayile"	K. Jamuna Rani & L. R. Eswari	A. Maruthakasi	02:28
"Achcham Enbadhu Madamaiada"	T. M. Soundararajan	Kannadasan	03:09
"Avala Ivala Therndhu Edu"	L. R. Eswari & L. R. Anjali	Kannadasan	02:38
"Engalin Rani"	Jikki & K. Jamuna Rani	A. Maruthakasi	04:11
"Kangal Irandum enru Unnai kandu"	P. Susheela	Kannadasan	04:04
"Kaaduthazhaikka.... Kanniyar Perumai"	S. C. Krishnan & P. Leela	Kannadasan	04:53
"Kaaviri Thaaye Kaaviri Thaaye"	K. Jamuna Rani	Kannadasan	03:08
"Kadhar Kozhunan"	Sirkazhi Govindarajan	Kannadasan	
"Kalaiyodu Kalandhadhu Unmai"	M. L. Vasanthakumari	Kannadasan	03:39
"Kaniya Kaniya Mazhalai Pesum"	T. M. Soundararajan & P. Susheela	Kannadasan	03:57
"Neeyo Nano Yaar Nilave"	P. B. Sreenivas, K. Jamuna Rani & P. Susheela	Kannadasan	03:29
"Paadupatta Thannale"	S. C. Krishnan	Kannadasan	
"Thandai Kondu"	T. M. Soundararajan	Kannadasan	07:62

== Release and reception ==
Mannathi Mannan was released on 19 October 1960, during Diwali. It was previously scheduled for 30 September. The Indian Express wrote "the story could have been very well developed in a different way [..] Anyway the picture is replete with romance, dance and fight" and praised the performances of star cast including Padmini. Kanthan of Kalki called it a very ordinary film, but good by Ramachandran standards. Despite facing competition from Kairasi, Petra Manam, and Paavai Vilakku, released on the same day, the film became a commercial success. It achieved cult status in Tamil cinema, and the song "Achcham Enbadhu Madamaiada" helped Ramachandran become a "cultural icon".
