= Baharon Phool Barsao (song) =

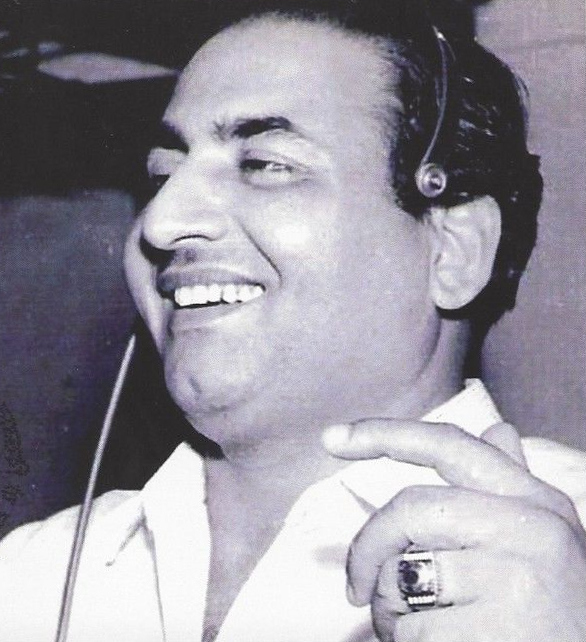

Song by Mohammed Rafi
- Language: Hindi
- Released: 1966
- Composer: Shankar Jaikishan
- Lyricist: Hasrat Jaipuri

"Baharon Phool Barsao" or "Baharon Phool Barsao, Mera Mehboob Aaya Hain" (lit. transl. "Seasons of spring, shower with flowers, my beloved has come") is an Indian Hindi song from the Bollywood film Suraj (1966). The lyrics were written by Hasrat Jaipuri, the music was composed by Shankar Jaikishan and the song was sung by Mohammed Rafi. The music of the song was composed in Dadra tala.

For this song, Hasrat Jaipuri was awarded the 1967 Filmfare Award for Best Lyricist. Mohammed Rafi was awarded the Filmfare award for Best Male Playback Singer in 1966 for this song. In a poll conducted by the BBC Radio in 2013, this song was voted as the most popular song in a list of the top 100 popular Bollywood songs of all time.

== Awards ==
Year	Award	Category	Recipient
1967	Filmfare Award	Best Lyricist	Hasrat Jaipuri
1966	Filmfare Award	Best Male Playback Singer	Mohammed Rafi
