= Jhoola (1962 film) =

1962 film by K. Shankar

Jhoola(1962 fim)
- Directed by: K. Shankar
- Written by: Dialogue: Rajendra Krishan
- Produced by: N. Vasudeva Menon
- Starring: Vyjayanthimala; Sunil Dutt; Pran; Rajendra Nath
- Cinematography: Thambu
- Edited by: K. Shankar; K. Narayanan
- Music by: Salil Chowdhury; Rajendra Krishan (Lyrics)
- Production company: Vijaya Vauhini Studios
- Distributed by: Vasu Films
- Release date: 1962
- Country: India
- Language: Hindi

Jhoola (transl. The Swing) is a 1962 Hindi-language romance film written by Rajendra Krishan and directed by K. Shankar. The film starred Vyjayanthimala and Sunil Dutt in the lead, after their successful collaboration in Sadhna (1958). The lead actors were supported by Pran, Rajendranath, Manmohan Krishna, Achala Sachdev, Leela Mishra, Randhir, Raj Mehra, Mohan Choti, Indira Bansal, Kusum Thakur and Tun Tun. The film was produced by N. Vasudeva Menon and was distributed by Vasu Films. The film's score was composed by Salil Chowdhury with lyrics provided by Rajendra Krishan. Editing was done by Shivaji Awdhut and was filmed by K. H. Kapadia. The film is a remake of the Tamil film Kairasi (1960).

== Cast ==
- Vyjayanthimala as Sumati
- Sunil Dutt as Dr. Arun
- Pran as Dharamraj / Mirza Singapori / Rai Bahadur Shyamlal Bihari
- Rajendranath as Madhu
- Manmohan Krishna as Head Constable Sundarlal
- Achala Sachdev as Kamla
- Leela Mishra as Dharamraj's employee
- Randhir as Shekhar
- Raj Mehra as Judge Ramkrishan
- Mohan Choti as Madhu's assistant
- Indira Bansal as Daughter
- Kusum Thakur as Sushilla
- Tun Tun as Mother

== Soundtrack ==
The film's score was composed by Salil Chowdhury with lyrics were by Rajendra Krishan

| # | Title | Singer(s) |
|---|---|---|
| 1 | " Aag Pani Mein Lagi" | Lata Mangeshkar, Mohammed Rafi |
| 2 | "Unse Bichhad Kar Jab Ham Roye" | Lata Mangeshkar |
| 3 | " Ek Samay Par Do Barsaten " | Manna Dey |
| 4 | " Door Bahut Aabadi Se" | Lata Mangeshkar, Mukesh |
