= Jeevitha Chakram =

- Theatrical release poster
- Directed by: C. S. Rao
- Written by: Vidwan Kannva Sri
- Screenplay by: Nava Sakthi Unit
- Story by: Nava Sakthi Unit
- Produced by: P. Gangadhara Rao
- Starring: N. T. Rama Rao; Vanisri; Sarada
- Cinematography: J. Satyanarayana
- Edited by: Veerappa
- Music by: Shankar Jaikishan
- Production company: Nava Sakthi Productions
- Release date: 31 March 1971
- Country: India
- Language: Telugu

Jeevitha Chakram (transl. Circle of Life) is a 1971 Indian Telugu-language drama film directed by C. S. Rao. It stars N. T. Rama Rao, Vanisri, and Sarada, with music composed by Shankar–Jaikishan. It is produced by P. Gangadhar Rao under the Nava Sakthi Productions banner.

== Cast ==
- N. T. Rama Rao as Raja
- Vanisri as Suseela
- Sharada as Kamala
- V. Nagayya as Dharma Rao
- Jaggayya as Shankar
- Relangi as Buchi Babu
- Ramana Reddy as 'Gunshot' Ramayya
- Padmanabham as Pichi Babu
- Prabhakar Reddy as Bhujangam
- Raavi Kondala Rao as Manager Achyutaramayya
- Perumallu as Bhushaiah
- Chalapathi Rao as Prabhakaram
- Sriranjani Jr. as Santhamma
- Hemalatha as Seetamma
- Surabhi Balasaraswathi as Kamini

== Soundtrack ==
Jeevitha Chakram

Soundtrack album by Shankar Jaikishan
- Released: 1971
- Genre: Soundtrack
- Length: 29:53
- Language: Telugu
- Producer: Shankar Jaikishan

Music composed by Shankar Jaikishan.

S. No	Song title	Lyrics	Singers	length
1	"Kanti Choopu Chepthondi"	Aarudhra	Ghantasala	3:56
2	"Kallallo Kallupetti Choodu"	Aarudhra	Ghantasala, Sarada	3:41
3	"Madhurati Madhuram"	Aarudhra	Ghantasala, Sarada	4:48
4	"Sudigaalona Deepam"	Aarudhra	Ghantasala	4:00
5	"Hai Pilla"	C. Narayana Reddy	S. P. Balasubrahmanyam, P. Susheela	4:44
6	"Kanti Choopu Chepthondi" (F)	Aarudhra	Sarada	3:30
7	"Bathukamma Bathukamma Uyyala"	C. Narayana Reddy	P. Susheela, Vasantha	5:14
