= 14th Filmfare Awards =

1967 awards for Hindi cinema

- Date: 1967
- Site: Bombay

Highlights
- Best Film: Guide
- Best Actor: Dev Anand for Guide
- Best Actress: Waheeda Rehman for Guide
- Most awards: Guide (7)
- Most nominations: Guide (9)

The 14th Filmfare Awards were held in 1967, honoring the best Hindi films of 1966.

Guide led the ceremony with 9 nominations, and won 7 awards, thus becoming the most-awarded film at the ceremony. It also became the first film to win all 4 major Filmfare Awards – Best Film, Best Director (for Vijay Anand), Best Actor (for Dev Anand) and Best Actress (for Waheeda Rehman).

The ceremony also proved to be controversial, as S. D. Burman who was nominated for Best Music Director, and Lata Mangeshkar who was nominated for Best Playback Singer for "Aaj Phir Jeene Ki Tamanna Hai", both for Guide, lost their respective awards to Shankar–Jaikishan and Mohammed Rafi (for "Baharon Phool Barsao"), both for Suraj, despite being highly-favored to win in their respective categories.

Shashikala received dual nominations for Best Supporting Actress for her performances in Anupama and Phool Aur Patthar, but lost to Simi Garewal who won the award for Do Badan.

== Main awards ==
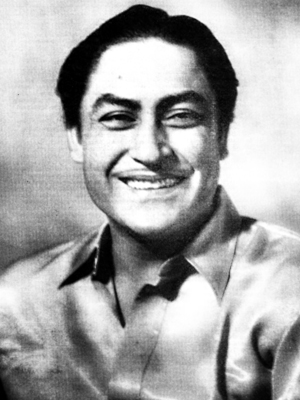
Ashok Kumar, Best Supporting Actor

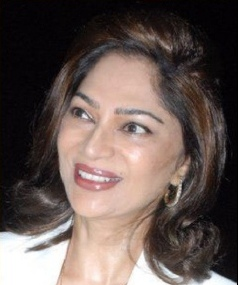
Simi Garewal, Best Supporting Actress

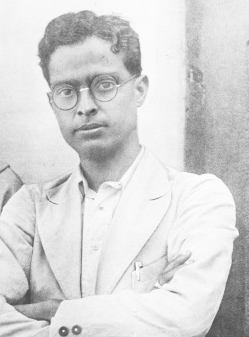
R. K. Narayan, Best Story

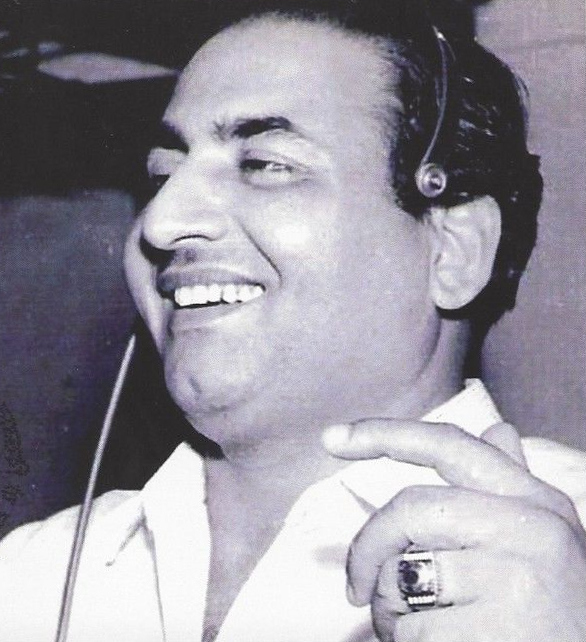
Mohammed Rafi, Best Playback Singer

Best Film
Guide – Navketan Films – Dev Anand; Anupama – L. B. Films – L. B. Lachman; Mamta – Charu Chitra
Best Actor	Best Actress
Dev Anand – Guide as Raju; Dharmendra – Phool Aur Patthar as Shakti Singh "Shaaka"; Dilip Kumar – Dil Diya Dard Liya as Shankar / Raja Sahab	Waheeda Rehman – Guide as Rosie Marco / Ms. Nalini; Meena Kumari – Phool Aur Patthar as Shanti Devi; Suchitra Sen – Mamta as Devyani - Pannabai / Suparna
Best Director	Best Performance in a Comic Role
Vijay Anand – Guide; Asit Sen – Mamta; Hrishikesh Mukherjee – Anupama	Mehmood – Pyar Kiye Jaa as Atma; Mehmood – Love in Tokyo as Mahesh; Om Prakash – Pyar Kiye Jaa as Ramlal
Best Supporting Actor	Best Supporting Actress
Ashok Kumar – Afsana as Gopal Das; Pran – Dil Diya Dard Liya as Thakur Ramesh; Rehman – Dil Ne Phir Yaad Kiya as Amjad	Simi Garewal – Do Badan as Dr. Anjali; Shashikala – Anupama as Anita Bakshi "Annie"; Shashikala – Phool Aur Patthar as Rita
Best Music Director	Best Lyricist
Shankar–Jaikishan – Suraj; Ravi – Do Badan; S. D. Burman – Guide	Hasrat Jaipuri – "Baharon Phool Barsao" from Suraj; Shailendra – "Sajan Re Jhoot" from Teesri Kasam; Shakeel Badayuni – "Naseeb Main Jiske" from Do Badan
Best Playback Singer – Male	Best Playback Singer – Female
Mohammed Rafi – "Baharon Phool Barsao" from Suraj	Award won by a male singer; Lata Mangeshkar – "Lo Aa Gayi" from Do Badan; Lata Mangeshkar – "Aaj Phir Jeene Ki Tamanna Hai" from Guide
Best Story	Best Dialogue
R. K. Narayan – Guide; Hrishikesh Mukherjee – Anupama; Nihar Ranjan Gupta – Mamta	Vijay Anand – Guide

== Technical Awards ==
Best Art Direction	Best Cinematography
Sant Singh – Yeh Raat Phir Na Aayegi (for B/W); Shanti Das – Phool Aur Patthar (for Color)	Jaywant Pathare – Anupama (for B/W); Fali Mistry – Guide (for Color)
Best Editing	Best Sound Design
Vasant Borkar – Phool Aur Patthar	Manohar Amberkar – Mera Saaya

== Critics' awards ==
Best Documentary
- Handicrafts of Rajasthan – Clement T. Baptista

== Superlatives ==
The following films had multiple wins and/or nominations

Movie	Awards	Nominations
Guide	7	9
Suraj	3	3
Phool Aur Patthar	2	5
Anupama	1	5
Do Badan	1	4
Mamta	0	4
Dil Diya Dard Liya	0	2

== See also ==
- 13th Filmfare Awards
- 16th Filmfare Awards
- 15th Filmfare Awards
- Filmfare Awards
