= Piloo =

Piloo is an Indian masculine given name that may refer to the following notable people:

- Piloo Mody (1926–1983), Indian architect and politician
- Piloo Reporter (1938–2023), Indian international cricket umpire
- Piloo Sarkari (1927–2018), Indian cyclist
