= Parchhain =

1952 film

- Directed by: V. Shantaram
- Written by: Shams Lakhnavi
- Produced by: V. Shantaram
- Starring: V. Shantaram; Jayshree; Sandhya; Lalita Pawar
- Cinematography: G. Balakrishna
- Music by: C. Ramchandra
- Production company: Rajkamal Kalamandir
- Release date: 1952
- Running time: 150 minutes
- Country: India
- Language: Hindi

Parchhain (Shadow) is a 1952 Hindi romantic melodrama film directed by V. Shantaram. The production company was Rajkamal Kalamandir. The story and dialogue were by Shams Lakhnavi, with cinematography by G. Balakrishna. Music direction was by C. Ramchandra and the lyricists was Noor Lakhnavi.

The cast included V. Shantaram, Jayashree, Sandhya, Lalita Pawar, Wasti and Saroj Khan.

Parchhain is cited as one of the films produced by Shantaram that was of "exceptional merit". The story revolves around a man who is accidentally blinded by a woman whom he falls in love with, only to lose her when he regains his sight.

== Plot ==
Tired of his life, Deepak (V. Shantaram), a boat man, tries to commit suicide. However his inner voice stops him. As he's returning home he gets hit in the eye by a bullet, blinding him. The accident has been caused by Saloni (Jayshree), a young lady also called Chhoti Rani (Young Queen), while she's out on a hunt. She takes him home with the view of getting him treatment. While staying in the big mansion Deepak soon falls in love with Saloni, who reciprocates his feelings. However this is not liked by the older Queen, Badi Rani (Lalita Pawar) as she wants Saloni to marry Vinod. She sends Deepak for eye treatment with Kishori (Sandhya), one of the maids in the house, whose voice is similar to Saloni's voice. Badi Rani dies, and when Saloni refuses to marry Vinod, he tries to rape her. While she's trying to escape, both are killed. On regaining his eyesight Deepak realises that Kishori, who has fallen in love with him is not Saloni. He returns to the mansion to be told about Saloni's death. He spends his days lighting a lamp on the shrine he builds for Saloni at the place where she died.

== Cast ==
- V. Shantaram
- Jayashree
- Sandhya
- Wasti
- Lalita Pawar
- Saroj Khan
- Asit Baran
- Nimbalkar
- G. Nirula

== Crew ==
- Production Company: Rajkamal Kalamandir
- Director: V. Shantaram
- Story: Shams Lakhnavi
- Dialogues: Shams Lakhnavi
- Cinematography: G. Balakrishna
- Music: C. Ramchandra
- Lyricist: Noor Lakhnavi
- Background Music: Vasant Desai
- Art Direction: P.S. Kale
- Sound: A.K. Parmar
- Choreographer: Natraj - Arjun Desai

== Soundtrack ==
C. Ramchandra composed the music for the film while Vasant Desai gave the background music. The popular songs from the film were "Mohabbat Hi Na Jo Samjhe, Woh Zalim Pyar Kya Jane", the solo by Talat Mahmood and the duet by Lata Mangeshkar and Talat Mahmood, "Apni Kaho, Kuch Meri Suno".

The lyrics were written by Noor Lakhnavi and playback singers were Lata Mangeshkar and Talat Mahmood.

=== Song list ===
Song	Singer	Raga
"Ae Dard-E-Jigar"	Lata Mangeshkar	
"Chanda Ki Chhaon Mein"	Lata Mangeshkar	
"Dub Jaye Jo Kismat Ka Tara"	Lata Mangeshkar	
"Katte Hai Dukh Mein Yeh Din"	Lata Mangeshkar	
"Sukh Le Gayo, Dukh De Gayo"	Lata Mangeshkar	
"Apni Kaho, Kuch Meri Suno, Kya Dil Ka Lagana Bhul Gaye"	Lata Mangeshkar, Talat Mahmood	Pilu
"Dil Dil Se Keh Raha Hai, Jo Tu Hai, Wohi Main Hoon"	Lata Mangeshkar, Talat Mahmood	
"Kisi Ne Mujhko Mere Ghar Mein Aake Loot Liya"	Lata Mangeshkar, Talat Mahmood	
"Mohabbat Hi Na Jo Samjhe, Woh Zalim Pyar Kya Jaane"	Talat Mahmood	
