= R. Govardhanam =

Indian music composer

- Born: 21 February 1928
- Died: 18 September 2017 (aged 99); Chennai
- Occupation: Music director

Ramakrishna Govardhanam (21 February 1928 – 18 September 2017) was an Indian composer who worked in the Tamil, Hindi, Kannada Malayalam, Telugu and Sinhala film industries. He sometimes collaborated with his brother, composer R. Sudarsanam.

== Filmography ==
Year	Film	Language	Director	Banner	Notes
1953	Jatakam	Tamil	R. Nagendra Rao	R. N. R. Pictures	
1953	Jataka Phala	Kannada	R. Nagendra Rao	R. N. R. Pictures	
1953	Jatakaphalam	Telugu	R. Nagendra Rao	R. N. R. Pictures	
1954	Kalahasti Mahatyam	Telugu	H. L. N. Simha	AVM Productions	along with R. Sudarsanam
1955	Aadarshasathi	Kannada	Chitrapu Narayana Murthy	AVM Productions	along with R. Sudarsanam
1956	Naga Devathai	Tamil	Chitrapu Narayana Murthy	AVM Productions	along with R. Sudarsanam
1956	Nagula Chavithi	Telugu	Chitrapu Narayana Murthy	AVM Productions	along with R. Sudarsanam
1956	Sadaarama	Telugu	K. R. Seetharama Sastry	Shankar Production	along with R. Sudarsanam
1956	Sadaarame	Kannada	K. R. Seetharama Sastry	Shankar Production	along with R. Sudarsanam
1958	Bhaktha Ravana	Tamil	K. Shankar	AVM Productions	along with R. Sudarsanam
1958	Bhookailas	Telugu	K. Shankar	AVM Productions	along with R. Sudarsanam
1958	Bhookailasa	Kannada	K. Shankar	AVM Productions	along with R. Sudarsanam
1959	Orey Vazhi	Tamil	K. Shankar	Vasu Films	
1960	Kairasi	Tamil	K. Shankar	Vasu Films	
1963	Constable Koothuru	Telugu	Tapi Chanakya	Chitrakala	
1964	Karna	Telugu	B. R. Panthulu	Padmini Pictures	with Viswanathan–Ramamoorthy
1967	Pattanathil Bhootham	Tamil	M. V. Raman	Sharada Productions	
1968	Basti Lo Bhootham	Telugu	M. V. Raman	Sharada Productions	
1968	Poovum Pottum	Tamil	Dada Mirasi	Vasu Films	
1968	Ramu	Telugu	A. C. Tirulokchandar	AVM Productions	
1969	Anjal Petti 520	Tamil	T. N. Balu	Bharath Movies	
1969	Mooga Nomu	Telugu	D. Yoganand	AVM Productions	
1969	Porchilai	Tamil	A. V. Francis	Agathiyam Productions	
1970	Singapoor Hantakulu	Telugu	T. N. Balu	Bharath Movies	
1971	Bomma Borusa	Telugu	K. Balachander	AVM Productions	
1971	Thallini Minchina Thalli	Telugu	G. S. Mani	Gemini Studios	with M. S. Viswanathan
1972	Maa Inti Kodalu	Telugu	Srikanth	RR Pictures	
1976	Varaprasadham	Tamil	K. Narayanan	Cine Chithra Combines	
1981	Kadavulin Theerpu	Tamil	C. N. Shanmugam	Senthil Sevarkodiyaan Creations	
