= Suraj (film) =

Film directed by T. Prakash Rao

- Poster
- Directed by: T. Prakash Rao
- Written by: Screenplay: Javar Seetharaman; Dialogue: Abrar Alvi
- Produced by: T.Govindarajan And S. Krishnamurthy
- Starring: Rajendra Kumar; Vyjayanthimala; Ajit; Mumtaz; Johnny Walker
- Cinematography: V. K. Murthy
- Edited by: N. M. Shankar
- Music by: Shankar Jaikishan
- Production company: Venus Pictures
- Distributed by: Rajshri Productions
- Release date: 25 March 1966
- Country: India
- Language: Hindi
- Box office: ₹ 5 crore

Suraj (transl. Sun) is a 1966 Hindi-language swashbuckler Ruritanian romance film produced by S. Krishnamurthy and T. Govindarajan and directed by T. Prakash Rao.

The film stars Rajendra Kumar and Vyjayanthimala, with Ajit, Mumtaz, Johnny Walker, Lalita Pawar, Neetu Singh, Gajanan Jagirdar, David Abraham Cheulkar, Agha, Mukri, Mallika and Niranjan Sharma in the supporting roles. The film's music was composed by Shankar Jaikishan, with the lyrics penned by Shailendra and Hasrat Jaipuri.

== Plot ==
Vikram Singh is the Maharaja of Pratap Nagar and is very impressed with his Senapati Sangram Singh for years of loyal service. He decides to make him a Maharaja and agrees to marry his daughter, Anuradha, to his son, Pratap. Sometime later Sangram Singh's necklace given by Vikram Singh was stolen. He accused his servant, Ram Singh. He abducts Sangram Singh's son and exchanges him with his own son. Years later, Vikram sends his now grown-up Anuradha to visit the coronation of Rajkumar Pratap Singh and approve of him as her husband, and she sets off without any escort with just her maid-servant, Kalavati, for company. Shortly thereafter, Vikram is informed that Kalavati has been abducted by a bandit named Suraj Singh, he accordingly rushes over to Sangram's and this is where he discovers to his shock that Kalavati is posing as Anuradha, and it is his daughter who has been abducted by Suraj. When Suraj is arrested and lodged in a dungeon, preparations are set forth for the coronation of Pratap and his subsequent marriage with Anuradha.

== Cast ==
- Rajendra Kumar as Suraj Singh
- Vyjayanthimala as The Princess Anuradha
- Ajit as Prince Pratap Singh
- Mumtaz as Kalavati
- Johnny Walker as Bhola
- Bharathi as Geeta
- Lalita Pawar as the Maharani
- Neetu Singh as Young Geeta
- Gajanan Jagirdar as Ram Singh
- David as Maharaja Vikram Singh
- Agha as Kotwal Bhakti Charan / Bhagat Ram
- Mukri as Anokhe
- Malika as Madhuri
- Niranjan Sharma as Maharaja Sangram Singh
- Moolchand as the chief of the Musicians
- Keshavlal as Pratap Singh's Man

== Soundtrack ==
Suraj

Soundtrack album by Shankar Jaikishan
- Released: 1966
- Recorded: Minoo Katrak
- Genre: Film soundtrack
- Label: The Gramophone Company of India
- Producer: Shankar Jaikishan

Shankar Jaikishan chronology
Amrapali	Suraj	Raat Aur Din

The film's music was composed by Shankar Jaikishan in one of their last successful albums. The lyrics were penned by Shailendra and Hasrat Jaipuri. The album also featured the singer Sharda with the chartbuster song "Titli Udi Ud Jo Chali", which became the song that she was most remembered for.

The soundtrack was listed by Planet Bollywood as number 86 on their list of 100 Greatest Bollywood Soundtracks. The song "Baharon Phool Barsao" topped the Binaca Geetmala annual list of 1966 charts. Similarly, the song "Titli Udi Ud Jo Chali" was listed at No. 21.

No.	Song	Singers	Picturized on	Length (m:ss)	Lyrics	Raga
1	"Dekho Mera Dil Machal Gaya"	Sharda	Vyjayanthimala	3.30	Shailendra	
2	"Titli Udi Ud Jo Chali"	Sharda	Vyjayanthimala and Mumtaz	3.47	Shailendra	
3	"Kaise Samjhaoon Badi Nasamajh Ho"	Mohammed Rafi, Asha Bhosle	Vyjayanthimala and Rajendra Kumar	6.32	Hasrat Jaipuri	Bhairavi (Hindustani)
4	"Itna Hai Tumse Pyar Mujhe"	Mohammed Rafi, Suman Kalyanpur	Vyjayanthimala and Rajendra Kumar	4.47	Hasrat Jaipuri	
5	"Chehre Pe Girin Zulfen"	Mohammed Rafi	Rajendra Kumar and Vyjayanthimala	5.21	Hasrat Jaipuri	
6	"Baharon Phool Barsao"	Mohammed Rafi	Rajendra Kumar and Vyjayanthimala	4.28	Hasrat Jaipuri	Shivaranjani
7	"O Ek Baar Aata Hai Din Aisa"	Mohammed Rafi, Asha Bhosle	Rajendra Kumar and Vvjayanthimala	5.02	Hasrat Jaipuri	

== Box office ==
At the end of its theatrical run, the film grossed around ₹ 50,000,000 with a net of ₹ 25,000,000, thus becoming the second highest-grossing film of 1966. Box Office India gave it the verdict of "super-hit. The film was also one of the last box office hits of Rajendra Kumar, who was regarded as Bollywood's silver jubilee actor. Vyjayanthimala and Rajendra Kumar had previously worked in many successful films such as Aas Ka Panchhi (1961), Sangam (1964) and Zindagi (1964).

== Awards ==
Ceremony	Award	Category	Nominee	Work	Outcome
Filmfare Awards	14th Filmfare Awards	Best Music Director	Shankar Jaikishan		Won
Filmfare Awards	14th Filmfare Awards	Best Lyricist	Hasrat Jaipuri	"Baharon Phool Barsao"	Won
Filmfare Awards	14th Filmfare Awards	Best Playback Singer	Mohammed Rafi	"Baharon Phool Barsao"	Won
