= Phagun (1958 film) =

Phagun फागुन
- Theatrical release poster
- Directed by: Bibhuti Mitra
- Written by: Pranab Roy
- Produced by: Bibhuti Mitra
- Starring: Madhubala; Bharat Bhushan
- Cinematography: D.N. Ganguly
- Music by: O. P. Nayyar
- Distributed by: Eros
- Release date: 17 October 1958
- Running time: 134 minutes
- Country: India
- Language: Hindi
- Box office: est. ₹14 million

Phagun (transl. Spring) is a 1958 Indian Hindi-language film directed and produced by Bibhuti Mitra and written by Pranab Roy. The film stars Madhubala and Bharat Bhushan in leading roles, and its musical score is composed by O. P. Nayyar.

A romantic musical, Phagun revolves around Bijan, a zamindar's son who falls in love with a dancer named Banani. They are not able to marry each other due to social differences in their lifetime and are reincarnated to complete their incomplete love tale.

Upon its release, Phagun received positive reviews and became one of the top-grossing hits of 1958.

== Plot ==
The new owners of Deepak Mahal meet with its caretaker, Mattu (Dhumal), who narrates the story of its former owners: Bijondra (Bharat Bhushan) - the only child of a wealthy Hindu Brahmin Zamindar; and Banani (Madhubala) – the only child of a single father, Banjara Sardar Tinkari (Murad). Starting with the move to evict the Banjaras from his father's property, flute-playing Bijondra meets and falls in love with pretty dancer Banani – leading to being asked to leave by his enraged father; while Banani's father plans her marriage to Banjara Madhal (Jeevan). They face several hurdles later in the story but still don't lose their love and compassion towards each other. One day when Bijondra and Banani are running away they meet an accident and both fall unconscious. A princess(Nishi (actress)) and her troops find the two in her way. The princess is attracted towards Bijondra and brings him to her palace where he is given rest. Upon waking up and achieving consciousness Bijondra sees himself surrounded by the princess and her servants. He asks everyone about his identity and gets enraged on getting no replies. The princess is satisfied to discover that Bijondra has lost his memory and tells him that he is her prince. Banani finds Bijondra but Bijondra doesn't recognise her and she is driven away on the orders of the princess. She visits the palace disguised as a monk and meets Bijondra. She tries to revoke Bijondra's memory but is unable to do so. Bijondra asks her not to cry and tells her that she will meet the person she is finding one day but tells that he himself is not the person Banani is searching for. Banani somehow takes Bijondra away from the princess and runs with him. The two find a big mansion and enter it for shelter. A man welcomes them and hysterically claims to be the father of Banani who left her to flow in a river by putting her in a box 20 years ago. Banani realises that the man is her father and introduces him to Bijondra who is still unable to remember anything. Upon her father's advice Banani goes to different places and prays to God for revoking Bijondra's memory. After days of prayers Bijondra's memory comes back but the two are soon finded by the Banjaras who were strongly disapproving their relationship. The Banjaras separate them and plan to burn Bijondra alive. However, It starts to rain heavily and the fire gets extinguished. The leader of the Banjaras who was the man who adopted Banani feels that their love is true and they both must not be separated. He takes Bijonra out of the fire with respect and says that he will allow Banani to marry Bijondra. Meanwhile Banjara Madhal forcefully takes Banani away and Bijondra follows them. They reach a hill top where Bijondra fights Banjara Madhal who eventually gets defeated and falls down the hill. Banani who was on the verge of falling down balances herself and the two are united once again. The story advances to the present day where the new owners of Deepak Mahal are being narrated this story of Bijondra and Banani. The story ends with the completion of Mattu's narration of the legend of Bijondra and Banani.

== Cast ==
- Madhubala as Banani
- Bharat Bhushan as Bijandra 'Bijan'
- Jeevan as Madhal
- Nishi as Jharna
- Dhumal as Mattu
- Mehmood as Gatekeeper
- Murad as Tinkari
- Badri Prasad as Bijan's Father
- Cuckoo as dancer
- Kammo as dancer

== Music ==
Lyrics by Qamar Jalalabadi. The music of the movie is composed by O. P. Nayyar. It has a popular song "Ek Pardesi Mera Dil Le Gaya". The soundtrack became popular at the film release.

Song	Singer	Raga
"Ek Pardesi Mera Dil Le Gaya"	Mohammed Rafi, Asha Bhosle	Pilu (raga)
"Main Soya Akhiyan Meeche, Teri Zulfon Ke Neeche"	Mohammed Rafi, Asha Bhosle	Pilu (raga)
"Tum Roothke Mat Jana, Mujhse Kya Shikwa, Deewana Hai"	Mohammed Rafi, Asha Bhosle	Pilu (raga)
"Ja, Meri Chhod De Kalai, Saiyan Ja Ja, Balam Mori Ja Ja"	Mohammed Rafi, Asha Bhosle	Pilu (raga)
"Bana De Prabhuji, Tu Bigdi Garib Ki Bana De Prabhuji"	Mohammed Rafi, Asha Bhosle	Pilu (raga)
"Chhum Chhum Ghunghroo Bole"	Asha Bhosle	Pilu (raga)
"Piya Piya, Na Lage Mora Jiya"	Asha Bhosle	Pilu (raga)
"Teer Yeh Chhupke Chalaya"	Asha Bhosle	Pilu (raga)
"Barso Re Bairi Badarwa"	Asha Bhosle	Pilu (raga)
"Shokh Shokh Ankhen"	Asha Bhosle	Pilu (raga)
"Sun Ja Pukar"	Asha Bhosle	Pilu (raga)

== Release ==
The film premiered at Naaz Theatre, Bombay, on 18 July 1958.

== Reception ==
=== Box office ===
Phagun was the sixth highest-grossing film of 1958. It grossed ₹1.4 crore, including a net of ₹0.7 crore.

1958 was a very successful year for Madhubala, as she had four major critical and commercial successes in this year: Chalti Ka Naam Gaadi, Howrah Bridge, Phagun and Kala Pani.

=== Critical reception ===
A review in The Times of India, dated 20 July 1958, carried the headline: "Phagun: A Feast For The Eyes And Ears".

On 3 August 1958, a critic for Hindustan Times wrote, "The ever popular Madhubala and Bharat Bhooshan are good enough reason for the long queues at cinema houses where Phagun is showing. Even if Madhubala is not expected to do much 'acting' in this film, the close-ups of her beautiful face—smiling, sad, pensive or even just blank—should make up for it to her many fans. [...] O. P. Nayyar's music contribution is the chief attraction of the film. The lyrics on the whole are enjoyable except for an odd line here and there."

Retrospectively, Saiam Z. U. stated that the film's story was a "predictable fare", although it was "engaging". She found the music to be "superb" and melodious. Khatija Akbar explained that Phagun was a success only due to its musical score, and the film had "little substance". In the book Of Happiness: An Essay, Volterra observed Madhubala "expresses a wide range of passion" in the film, and compared her performance to that of Elizabeth Taylor in Cleopatra (1963).
