= Shabaab (film) =

1954 Indian film

- Directed by: M. Sadiq
- Written by: Azm Bazidpuri
- Story by: Azm Bazidpuri
- Produced by: M. Sadiq
- Starring: Bharat Bhushan; Nutan
- Cinematography: Ratan L. Nagar
- Edited by: Moosa Mansoor
- Music by: Naushad
- Production company: Sadiq Productions
- Distributed by: Sadiq Productions
- Release date: 1954
- Language: Hindi

Shabaab (Hindi: शबाब 'youth') is a 1954 Bollywood movie. Made in the Hindi language and directed by M. Sadiq, it stars Bharat Bhushan and Nutan.

== Cast ==
- Bharat Bhushan
- Nutan
- Asant Kumar
- Shyam Kumar
- Badri Prasad
- Yashodra Katju
- Wasti

== Music ==
Shabaab

Soundtrack album by Naushad
- Released: 1954
- Genre: Feature film soundtrack

Naushad chronology
Amar (1954)	Shabaab (1954)	Uran Khatola (1955)

Scored by Naushad and written by Shakeel Badayuni, the movie featured a soundtrack:

1. "Daya Kar He Giridhar Gopal" - Amir Khan - Raga Multani
2. "Mehlon Mein Rahne Wale" - Mohammed Rafi - Sahana (raga)
3. "Mar Gaye Ham Jeete Ji Malik" - Lata Mangeshkar - Tilang
4. "Bhagat Ke Bas Mein Hai Bhagwan" - Manna Dey
5. "Jogan Ban Jaungi Sayyan Tore Karan" - Lata Mangeshkar - Khamaj
6. "Lagi More Man Ki O Sajna" - Shamshad Begum
7. "Yehi Armaan Lekar Aaj Apne Ghar Se" - Mohammed Rafi - Tilang
8. "Jo Main Janti, Bichharat Hain Sayyan, Ghunghata Mein Aag Laga Deti" - Lata Mangeshkar - Mand
9. "Man Ki Been Matwari Baje" - Mohammed Rafi, Lata Mangeshkar - Raga Bahar with a trace of Raga Basant
10. "Chandan Ka Palna Resham Ki Dori" - Lata Mangeshkar, Hemant Kumar - Pilu
11. "Aaye Na Balam Wada Karke" - Mohammed Rafi - Tilak Kamod
12. "Marna Teri Gali Mein Jeena Teri Gali Mein" - Lata Mangeshkar - composition in Pahadi (raga)
