= Pattanathil Bhootham =

1967 film by M. V. Raman

- Theatrical release poster
- Directed by: M. V. Raman
- Screenplay by: Javar Seetharaman
- Based on: The Brass Bottle
- Produced by: Venus Pictures
- Starring: Jaishankar; K. R. Vijaya
- Cinematography: Ravikant Nagaich
- Edited by: M. V. Raman; R. Bhaskaran
- Music by: R. Govardhanam
- Production company: Sharada Productions
- Distributed by: Vijaya Sri Pictures
- Release date: 14 April 1967
- Running time: 170 minutes
- Country: India
- Language: Tamil

Pattanathil Bhootham (transl. Genie in the city) is a 1967 Indian Tamil-language fantasy comedy film, directed and co-edited by M. V. Raman, written by Javar Seetharaman and produced by Venus Pictures. An adaptation of the American film The Brass Bottle (1964), it stars Jaishankar and K. R. Vijaya, with Nagesh, Balaji, Manohar, V. K. Ramasamy, V. S. Raghavan, Seetharaman, Rama Prabha and Vijaya Lalitha in supporting roles. The film revolves around two youngsters who inadvertently unleash a genie from an urn they won, and use him to satisfy their wants. It was released on 14 April 1967 and became a major commercial success.

== Plot ==
Partners Thangavel and Sabapathy run a successful business enterprise; Sabapathy secretly runs a smuggling racket with his son Mani and a gangster Pandi. The superstitious Thangavel possesses a large urn which he considers a bad omen. To get rid of the urn, he donates it as a prize for a competition at his daughter Latha's college. Latha's lover Bhaskar, who studies in the same college and lives with his best friend Seenu, wins the urn in the competition. Believing the urn contains fruits, Seenu and Bhaskar open it, unwittingly releasing a genie named Jee-Boom-Ba who was trapped in it for 3000 years.

Jee-Boom-Ba vows to help the two friends who set him free. He provides them with money, cars, mansions to live and takes care of their every need. The friends achieve many things with the help of Jee-Boom-Ba and even win a basketball game. Bhaskar seeks the powers of Jee-Boom-Ba to impress Thangavel but things do not go quite as planned. Sabapathy and Mani realise there is something fishy about Bhaskar's sudden rise to success. Jee-Boom-Ba's closeness and support to Bhaskar creates misunderstandings between Latha and Bhaskar, and she stays away from him.

Mani and Pandian, assuming that Jee-Boom-Ba is a smuggler, forcibly take him to their place and pressurise him to join their business. He refuses and escapes after learning their secrets. Meanwhile, Bhaskar becomes upset and requests Jee-Boom-Ba to leave so that he can get Latha back. Jee-Boom-Ba decides to meet Latha in normal attire and influence her to return to Bhaskar. When he meets her, she also insists that he should leave, blaming him for her separation. Jee-Boom-Ba leaves their lives and asserts that he would only return when she wholeheartedly wishes his return.

Still assuming Jee-Boom-Ba to be a big smuggler, Mani and Pandi decide to get hold of him at any cost since he knows their secret and hideout. To get Jee-Boom-Ba, they plan to take Bhaskar into custody. They mislead Latha into thinking that they are saving Bhaskar from Jee-Boom-Ba and manage to bring Bhaskar and Latha to their hideout by subterfuge. On reaching there, their plan of torturing Bhaskar to know Jee-Boom-Ba's whereabouts is revealed.

Mani plans to kill his lover Rita to marry Latha. Rita learns of this, kills Pandi and joins Bhaskar and Latha as they escape via boat. Mani follows them via helicopter; Rita is killed defending them, Latha is kidnapped and Bhaskar hangs by one of the helicopter's ledges. Remembering Jee-Boom-Ba's words, Latha calls him; when Bhaskar falls from the helicopter, Jee-Boom-Ba saves him, creates a flying car for the two ride, and they defeat Mani. Their crimes having been exposed by Seenu, Sabapathy and Mani are arrested. Bhaskar marries Latha and Seenu marries his lover Saroja. Jee-Boom-Ba decides to help other people in the world in the name of "good luck".

== Cast ==
- Jaishankar as Bhaskar
- K. R. Vijaya as Latha
- Nagesh as Seenu
- Balaji as Mani
- Manohar as Pandi
- V. K. Ramasamy as Thangavel Mudaliyar
- V. S. Raghavan as Sabapathy
- Javar Seetharaman as Jee-Boom-Baa
- Sarojadevi as Ramba
- Rama Prabha as Saroja
- Vijaya Lalitha as Rita

== Production ==
The 1964 American film The Brass Bottle was a worldwide success, especially in Madras (now Chennai). Javar Seetharaman rewrote the film as Pattanathil Bootham, and starred as the genie, reprising the role originally played by Burl Ives. Director M. V. Raman called Pattanathil Bhootham "a much improved version" of the American film. The film also took inspiration from the folktale of Aladdin.

== Soundtrack ==
The soundtrack was composed by R. Govardhanam and the lyrics were written by Kannadasan. Kannadasan, who wanted to join the Indian National Congress was waiting for the acceptance from the then Congress President K. Kamaraj, which made him to write the lines "Antha Sivagami maganidam seithi cholladi, ennai serum naal parka cholladi, veru yeverodum naan pesa vaarthai yethadi" (Tell Sivagami's son to fix the date to enrol me), indirectly referring to Kamaraj, whose mother's name was Sivagami. A trombone was used as an instrument in the song "Ulagathil Sirandhadhu". The songs "Kannil Kandathellam", "Naan Yaar", "Ulagathil Sirandhadhu" and "Andha Sivagami" attained popularity. Music historian Vamanan wrote, "Whether it be a ghazal-like romantic number (Andha Sivakami Maganidam), or a competition song that must flow through the comic to the romantic to the sentimental (Ulagathil Sirandhadhu Edhu) or a poignant number (Kannile Kandadhellaam Kaatchiyaa), Govardhanam measures up to his melody like a master."

Track listing
No.	Title	Singer(s)	Length
1.	"Kannil Kandathellam"	T. M. Soundararajan, P. Susheela	04:10
2.	"Ithazhlai Virithathu"	T. M. Soundararajan, L. R. Eswari	05:58
3.	"Naan Yaar"	P. Susheela	03:14
4.	"Antha Sivagami"	T. M. Soundararajan, P. Susheela	06:07
5.	"Ulagathil Sirandhadhu"	T. M. Soundararajan, A. L. Raghavan, P. Susheela	06:02
6.	"Edhirpaaramal Virundhaali"	P. Susheela	04:20
Total length:			25:31

== Release and reception ==
Pattanathil Bhootham was released on 14 April 1967, during Puthandu. Kalki appreciated the sound recording, colour mixing and Seetharaman's performance. Ananda Vikatan, in a review dated 30 April 1967, applauded the cinematography, particularly the trick shots and colour scenes.Despite facing competition from Magaraasi, released on the same day, it became a major commercial success.

== Bibliography ==
- Cowie, Peter; Elley, Derek (1977). World Filmography: 1967. Fairleigh Dickinson University Press. ISBN 978-0-498-01565-6.
- Dhananjayan, G. (2011). The Best of Tamil Cinema, 1931 to 2010: 1931–1976. Galatta Media. OCLC 733724281.
