= Aani Ver =

1981 film directed by K. Vijayan

- Poster
- Directed by: K. Vijayan
- Written by: Shanmugapriyan
- Produced by: Thiruppur Mani
- Starring: Sivakumar; Saritha
- Cinematography: N. Balakrishnan
- Edited by: T. Rajasekhar
- Music by: Shankar–Ganesh
- Production company: Vivekananda Pictures
- Release date: 10 April 1981
- Country: India
- Language: Tamil

Aani Ver (transl. Root) is a 1981 Indian Tamil-language drama film directed by K. Vijayan and produced by Thiruppur Mani under Vivekananda Pictures, starring Sivakumar and Saritha. It was released on 10 April 1981.

== Plot ==
Arukkani, a lower-caste village girl, clears her Union Public Service Commission examination and becomes a collector. But her husband Raman is illiterate, creating great difficulties as Arukkani tries to perform her social and official roles. Unable to resolve this tension, she quits her job to remain as Raman's dutiful wife.

== Cast ==
- Saritha as Arukkani
- Sivakumar as Raman
- Sathyaraj as Malaimannan
- Poornam Viswanathan
- S. N. Lakshmi as Sellakalai
- S. S. Chandran

== Soundtrack ==
The soundtrack was composed by Shankar–Ganesh. The song "Naan Thane Oru Pudhu Kavithai" is based on "Rasputin" by Boney M.

Track listing
No.	Title	Lyrics	Singer(s)	Length
1.	"Maniyadicha Soru"	Pulamaipithan	Malaysia Vasudevan
2.	"Muthu Muthu"	Pulamaipithan	Vani Jairam
3.	"Naan Thane Oru Pudhu Kavithai"	Vaali	Vani Jairam

== Release and reception ==
Aani Ver was released on 10 April 1981. Reviewing the film for the magazine Idhayam Pesigirathu, the future Tamil Nadu chief minister J. Jayalalithaa was critical of the climax scene where the heroine sacrifices her employment to aid her husband. Nalini Sastry of Kalki felt Viswanathan was underutilised, but added that director Vijayan said what he wanted to say without stumbling, and appreciated the dialogues.
