= Nai Umar Ki Nai Fasal =

- Starring: Tanuja; Sushama Shiromanee
- Music by: Roshan
- Release date: 1 January 1966
- Country: India
- Language: Hindi

Nai Umar Ki Nai Fasal is a Hindi film starring Tanuja and Rajeev. It was directed by R. Chandra. The film was released on 1 January 1966.

The film was shot in the Aligarh Muslim University campus.

== Plot ==
This is a story of a student, who in the prime of his career, gets ruffled up, become impulsive and is inclined to go against the discipline of the University. He and his enthusiastic friends are led away and misguided by an outside agency for its personal motives. This is opposed by the hero's own fiancee—a college girl in the same University--- along with other supporters including his own brother. But before the realization dawns on the students, harm to the prestige of the community and harm to the family was done. Ultimately, it is realized that patriotism is not politics, and the students can be patriotic and help the Mother Land in one and thousand ways without being politicians themselves, so long they are pursuing their studies. After having completed their studies, their whole life is before them. If this film is appreciated in its true perspective by the students and their parents, it has served its purpose. (Extract from the statement of the Prime Minister of India Shri Lal Bahadur Shastri delivered in Allahabad and published in The Times of India dated 18 December 1965).

== Songs ==
One of the famous songs, "Kaaravaan Guzar Gayaa", sung by Mohammad Rafi, was written by Gopaldas Neeraj.

1. "Aaj Ki Raat Badi Shokh Badi Natkhat Hai" - Mohammad Rafi (solo)
2. "Aaj Ki Raat Badi Shokh Badi Natkhat Hai" - Mohd Rafi & Asha Bhosle (duet)
3. "Dekhati Hi Raho Aaj Darpan Na Tum" - Mukesh
4. "Isko Bhi Apnaata Chal" - Mohd Rafi
5. "Kaaravaan Guzar Gayaa" - Mohd Rafi
6. "Meri Saiyyaan Gulbiya Ka Phool" - Suman Kalyanpur, Minoo Purushottam
7. "Nai Umar Ki Naye Sitaron" - Bhupinder Singh
8. "Thi Shubh Suhaag Ki Raat" - Manna Dey
