= Aap Ki Sewa Mein =

1946 film

- Release date: 1946
- Country: India
- Language: Hindi

Aap Ki Sewa Mein is a 1946 Bollywood film. Popular Indian singer Lata Mangeshkar started her Hindi playback singing career with this film.
