= Sangeeta Lakshmi =

- Theatrical release poster
- Directed by: Giduturi Suryam
- Written by: Acharya Aatreya (dialogues)
- Screenplay by: Giduturi Suryam
- Story by: Giduturi Suryam
- Produced by: P. Narasimha Rao; Amara Ramasubba Rao
- Starring: N. T. Rama Rao; Jamuna
- Cinematography: Annaiah
- Edited by: M. N. N. Murthy
- Music by: S. Rajeswara Rao
- Production company: Seetaramanjaneya Pictures
- Release date: 7 July 1966
- Running time: 127 mins
- Country: India
- Language: Telugu

Sangeeta Lakshmi is a 1966 Indian Telugu-language drama film, produced by P. Narasimha Rao, Amara Ramasubba Rao under the Seetaramanjaneya Pictures banner. It stars N. T. Rama Rao, Jamuna with music composed by S. Rajeswara Rao.

== Cast ==
- N. T. Rama Rao as Venu
- Jamuna as Radha
- S. V. Ranga Rao as Kondala Rao
- Nagabhushanam as Anand
- Ramana Reddy as Govindaiah
- Raja Babu as Chikkeswara Rao
- Suryakantham as Kantham
- L. Vijayalakshmi as Nalini
- Nirmalamma as Jayamma
- Baby Rani

== Soundtrack ==
Sangeeta Lakshmi

Film score by S. Rajeswara Rao
- Released: 1966
- Genre: Soundtrack
- Length: 36:25
- Producer: S. Rajeswara Rao

S. Rajeswara Rao chronology
| Palnati Yuddham (1966) | Sangeeta Lakshmi (1966) | Rangula Ratnam (1966) |

Music composed by S. Rajeswara Rao. Music released by Audio Company.

| S. No. | Song title | Lyrics | Singers | length |
|---|---|---|---|---|
| 1 | "Jaganmatha" | Acharya Aatreya | Ghantasala, P. Susheela | 3:05 |
| 2 | "Paataku Pallavi Praanam" | Acharya Aatreya | Ghantasala, P. Susheela | 3:01 |
| 3 | "Kalo Nijamo" | Elchuri Subrahmanyam | Ghantasala, P. Susheela | 5:14 |
| 4 | "Kadilinchi Vedanalone" | C. Narayana Reddy | Ghantasala | 3:33 |
| 5 | "Papa Papa" | Acharya Aatreya | P. Susheela | 2:30 |
| 6 | "Silakave" | Dasaradhi | Ghantasala, S. Janaki | 3:16 |
| 7 | "Sri 420" | Sri Sri | L. R. Eswari, Basaveswara Rao | 4:19 |
| 8 | "Nenu Puttina" | Acharya Aatreya | Ghantasala, P. Susheela | 4:38 |
| 9 | "Rasakreeda Ika" | Acharya Aatreya | P. Susheela, S. Janaki | 6:49 |
