= Paavai Vilakku =

1960 film by K. Somu

- Theatrical release poster
- Directed by: K. Somu
- Screenplay by: A. P. Nagarajan
- Based on: Paavai Vilakku by Akilan
- Produced by: T. Vijayarangam; V. K. Gopanna
- Starring: Sivaji Ganesan; Sowcar Janaki; Pandari Bai; M. N. Rajam; Kumari Kamala
- Cinematography: V. K. Gopanna
- Edited by: T. Vijayarangam (supervisor); K. Thurairaj
- Music by: K. V. Mahadevan
- Production company: Sri Vijayagopal Pictures
- Distributed by: Sivaji Films
- Release date: 19 October 1960
- Running time: 170 minutes
- Country: India
- Language: Tamil

Paavai Vilakku (transl. Lady with a Lamp) is a 1960 Indian Tamil-language drama film directed by K. Somu and written by A. P. Nagarajan. The film stars Sivaji Ganesan, Sowcar Janaki, Pandari Bai, M. N. Rajam and Kumari Kamala. It is based on Akilan's novel of the same name, serialised in the Tamil magazine Kalki. Paavai Vilakku was released on 19 October 1960, Diwali day.

== Plot ==
Thanikachalam and Gowri are a married couple, and they have a daughter named Kalyani. Sengamalam is a dancer to whom Thanikachalam is attracted, but they do not marry since he already has a wife. Devaki, a widow, is also attracted to him, but later starts to treat him as a brother. Uma, a friend of Gowri, stays with the couple and raises their child as her own. She too falls in love with Thanikachalam, but is not able to marry him. An accident at Thanikachalam's house results in the death of Kalyani; Uma is not informed of her death. She later gets into a similar accident and upon learning about the child's death, she dies in the arms of Gowri and Thanikachalam.

== Cast ==
Male cast

- Sivaji Ganesan as Thanikachalam
- V. K. Ramasamy
- Sarangapani
- Ashokan
- Karunanidhi

Female cast

- Sowcar Janaki as Gowri
- Pandari Bai as Devaki
- M. N. Rajam as Uma
- Kumari Kamala as Sengamalam

Balaji, Prem Nazir, Sriram and Santhanam make guest appearances as Thanikachalam's friends.

== Production ==
Paavai Vilakku was a novel written by Akilan and serialised in the Tamil magazine Kalki. The film version of this novel was directed by K. Somu, written by A. P. Nagarajan, and produced by editor T. Vijayarangam and cinematographer V. K. Gopanna under the Sri Vijayagopal Pictures. Sivaji Ganesan initially wanted B. R. Panthulu to produce this film. Ganesan's home, Annai Illam, also features in the film.

== Soundtrack ==
The soundtrack was composed by K. V. Mahadevan, and the lyrics were written by A. Maruthakasi. The song "Aayiram Kan Podhadhu" is set in the raga known as Mand, and "Mangiyathor Nilavinile" is based on Subramania Bharati's poem of the same name.

Track listing
No.	Title	Lyrics	Singer(s)	Length
1.	"Aayiram Kan Podhadhu"	A. Maruthakasi	C. S. Jayaraman	3:24
2.	"Kaaviyama Nenjil"	A. Maruthakasi	C. S. Jayaraman, P. Susheela	5:08
3.	"Mangiyathor Nilavinile"	Subramania Bharati	C. S. Jayaraman	3:24
4.	"Naan Unnai Ninaikkaatha"	A. Maruthakasi	P. Susheela	5:19
5.	"Nee Sirithal"	A. Maruthakasi	Soolamangalam Rajalakshmi	3:44
6.	"Sidhariya Sadhangaigal"	A. Maruthakasi	P. Susheela	2:58
7.	"Vannathamizh Pennoruthi"	A. Maruthakasi	C. S. Jayaraman, L. R. Eswari	4:06
8.	"Vetkamaaga Irukkuthu"	A. Maruthakasi	Soolamangalam Rajalakshmi	1:52
Total length:				29:55

== Release and reception ==
Paavai Vilakku was released on 19 October 1960, during Diwali. The film was distributed by Sivaji Films in Madras. The Indian Express wrote, "Despite the picture being crowded with a battalion of familiar faces, the total effect is pleasing and K. Somu's direction compels attention". Kanthan of Kalki said K. Sarangapani, Ramasamy and A. Karunanidhi gave light to the film. The film did not perform well at box-office.
