= Dhani (settlement type) =

Smallest conglomeration of houses

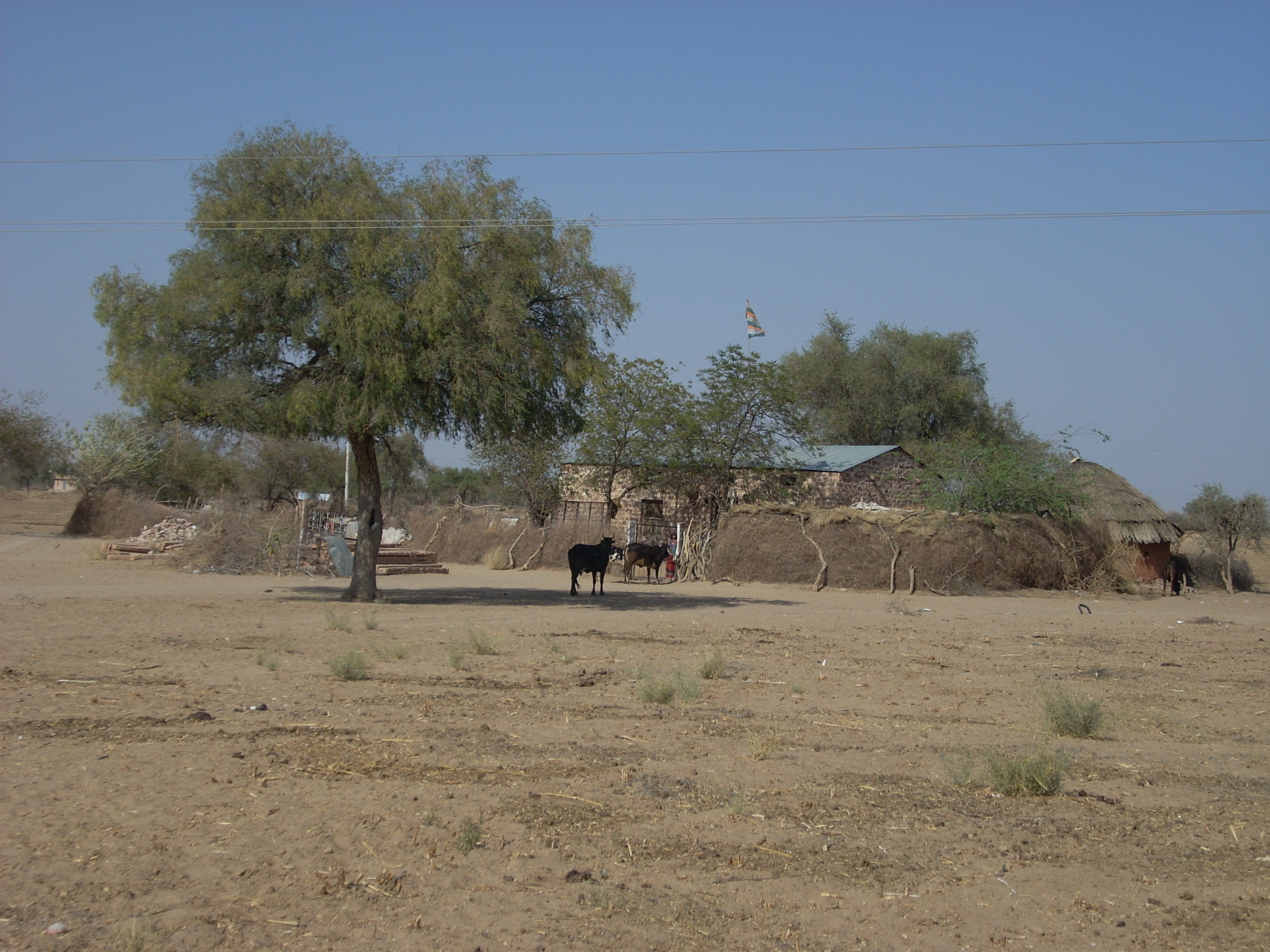
View of a dhani

Dhani (Hindi: ढाणी ḍhāṇī) or Thok is a type of hamlet, the smallest conglomeration of houses, in the sandy Bagar region of the northwestern states of Rajasthan, Haryana and Punjab in India. Per the Census of India, 70% of Indians live in villages. 80% of the villages have a population of less than 1000 people and each consists of a cluster of hamlets (e.g. dhani, nesada, pada, bigha). Most dhanis are nucleated settlements, while others are more dispersed. A dhani could be as small as one isolated house for a single family or a small cluster of several houses which could grow in number with successive generations, and even become a village by itself. All families living in a dhani are relatives or at least are of the same caste. An isolated collection of several dhanis, which could be few hundred meters apart, constitutes a gram panchayat village community. A typical dhani in the arid zone of Rajasthan is a cluster of huts with a boundary (bara or बाड़ा) made of dried shrubs around it and with owners' livestock such as goats, sheep and camels inside the bara. Dhani are atypically mud huts in Rajasthan. Houses in dani nowadays are made of modern brick and mortar, specially in affluent higher-per-capita-income states of Haryana and Punjab, and some richer families of Rajasthan.

A hamlet is called "Nesada" (નેસાડા) in Gujarat, "Pada" (पाडा, for example Nagpada and Patlipada) in Maharashtra, "Bigha" (बिघा, for example Bhagan Bigha and Jhakar Bigha) in Bihar.

== Etymology ==
The word dhan (धन in Hindi, धण in Haryanvi and Rajasthani languages) means wealth or possession, and dhani means wealthy in English (धनी in Hindi, धणी in Haryanvi and Rajasthani). Thus, in the context of a hamlet, the corrupted form of Hindi word dhani is pronounced dhaani (ढाणी) in Haryanvi and Rajasthani languages, which implies the "wealth or possessed settlement" (of the owner). Hence, Dahni's name usually have a prefix, such as "xyz's Dhani", where "xyz" is either the name or gotra of founder-owner. Examples include Garodia Ki Dhani, Ghaslo Ki Dhani, Gujjaro ki Dhani, Meharon Ki Dhani, Navora Ki Dhani, Pujari Ki Dhani, Salamsingh Ki Dhani, Dhab Dhani and Nimakidhani. Example of gotra based dhani include Taak Ki Dhani, Dhab Poonia.

== Caste system ==
Usually there is one specific caste (such as Jat, Kumhar (Prajapat), Gujjar, Rajput, Meena, etc.) or more typically a specific gotra (Jaglan, Dhillon, Gehlot, etc.) of a particular caste that comprises all or the bulk of population of dhani.

== Dhanis as origin of Chak ==
During the British Raj when new canals were built to irrigate barren (bangar, barani and bagar tract) areas of Punjab region, to farm the land migrant farmers were brought in to settle into those areas around the core of new villages [which started out as dhanis]. Those new villages falling in under the irrigation of canals were given a unique chak number each and government left it to those residents to give each "chak" a proper village name later. Thus, the term "village" became synonymous with "chak".

== See also ==
- Bhattiana
- Chak (village)
- Deshwali dialect
- Doab
- Jangladesh
- Johad
- Khadir and Bangar
