= Dhani =

Dhani may refer to:

== Places ==
- Dhani (settlement type), a type of small settlement in India
- Dhani Bandhwali, small village situated near the town of Nangal Choudhary, India
- Dhani Kumharan, small village in the Buhana tehsil of Jhunjhunu district of Rajasthan, India
- Dhani Poonia, village in Taranagar tehsil of Churu district in Rajasthan, India
- Dhani-Sela, village located in the Bali tehsil in the Pali district of Rajasthan, India
- Dhani Waterfall, high waterfall in Neelum Valley, Asad Kashmir, Pakistan
- Ghaslo Ki Dhani, village of Kishangarh tahsil, Ajmer district, Rajasthan, India
- Meharon Ki Dhani, small village in Jaisalmer district, Rajasthan, India
- Salamsingh Ki Dhani, small village in the outskirts of the Sikar city, Rajasthan, India

== People ==
=== Given name ===
- Dhani Ram Chatrik (1876–1954), pioneer of modern Punjabi poetry
- Dhani Ram Shandil (born 1940), Indian colonel and politician
- Dhani Muhammad Prasetyo (born 1972), Indonesian rock musician, singer-songwriter and producer popularly known as Ahmad Dhani
- Dhani Harrison (born 1978), English musician
- Dhani Jones (born 1978), American football player and television host
- Dhani Lennevald (born 1984), Swedish Pop/R&B singer and former member of the pop band the A*Teens

=== Middle name ===
- Kallu Dhani Ram (born 1923), head of the oldest farmers union in Fiji

=== Family name ===
- Omar Dhani (1924–2009), Indonesian air marshal

=== Honorific title ===
- Dhani (Master/Lord), one of the components of the honorific title of the Aga Khan

== Others ==
- Dhani (raga), an Indian classical raga
- Dhani dialect, a dialect of Punjabi spoken in Pakistan
- Dhani (company), an Indian online brokerage company

== See also ==
- Dhanni (disambiguation)
- Dhana (disambiguation)
- Rajdhani (disambiguation)
- Dhaani, a 2003 album by Pakistani pop band Strings
- Dhany (born 1972), Italian singer
