= Dhana (disambiguation) =

Dhana may refer to:

- Dhana, a census town in Sagar district in the state of Madhya Pradesh, India
- Dhana Nanda, last emperor of the Nanda dynasty of India, usurped by the Mauryan Empire
- Dhanadeva (fl. 1st-century BCE), ancient Indian ruler of Ayodhya or Saketa
- Jebel Dhana, an airport in the United Arab Emirates
- dhana, or dhana lilia, another word for coriander leaves
- dhana, or dhania, another word for coriander seeds
- Dhana Taprogge, lead vocalist for Taxi Doll

== See also ==
- Dhani (disambiguation)
