= Patdeep =

Hindustani classical raga

- Thaat: Kafi
- Time of day: Afternoon
- Arohana: 'N S g m P N S'
- Avarohana: S' N D P, m P g, m g R S
- Vadi: Pa
- Samavadi: Sa
- Similar: Dhanashree; Dhani; Bhimpalasi; Hamsakinkini; Patdeepaki; Gourimanohari

Patdeep or Patdip (पटदीप), is a Hindustani classical raga from the Kafi Thaat.

== Theory ==
=== Aroha and Avaroha ===
Notation: S r R g G M Ḿ P d D n N S

Lower case indicates 'komal' or flat notes, " indicates higher (third) octave, ' indicates lower (first) octave

- Aroha: N' S g M P N S"
- Avaroha: S" N D P, M— P g, m g R S

The raag has Komal Ga. It is an Audava-Sampoorna raga, implying that it has 5 notes in Arohana and 7 in Avarohana. Raag Patdeep is formed when pure N is taken instead of komal n in Raag Bhimpalasi. Patdeep is essentially Gowrimanohari sans rishaba and dhaivata in ascent.

=== Vadi and Samavadi ===
- Vadi: Pa
- Samavadi: Sa

=== Pakad or Chalan ===
- Pakad or Chalan: N' S g M P (M) g, M g R S, g M P N S" D P, M P g, M g R S.

== Film songs ==
=== Language : Marathi ===
| Song | Movie | Composer | Singers |
|---|---|---|---|
| Marma Bandhatali Thhev Hi | Sanyasta Khadag | Vaze Buva | Dinanath Mangeshkar |
| Sunya Sunya Maifalit | Umbarthha | Hridaynath Mangeshkar | Lata Mangeshkar |

=== Language : Hindi ===
| Song | Movie | Composer | Singers |
|---|---|---|---|
| Megha Chhaye Adhi Rat | Sharmeelee | S. D. Burman | Lata Mangeshkar |
| Saaz Ho Tum Avaaz Hun Main | Saaz Aur Awaz(1966 film) | Naushad | Mohammad Rafi |
| E Ajnabi | Dil Se | A R Rahman | Udit Narayan, Mahalakshmi Iyer |

=== Language: Malayalam ===
| Song | Movie | Composer | Singers |
|---|---|---|---|
| Anuraga Lola gathri | Dhwani | Naushad | K. J. Yesudas & P. Susheela |
| Tu Badi Masha Allah (Sufi Qawwali) | His Highness Abdullah | Raveendran | K. J. Yesudas |
| Kathirunnu Kathirunnu | Ennu Ninte Moideen | M. Jayachandran | Shreya Ghoshal |
| Aadharanjali | Romancham | Sushin Shyam | Sushin Shyam, Madhuvanti Narayan |

=== Language:Tamil ===
Songs composed in Gourimanohari (Carnatic) which is equivalent to Patdeep

| Song | Movie/Album | Composer | Singer |
|---|---|---|---|
| Paattum Naane | Thiruvilaiyadal | K. V. Mahadevan | T. M. Soundararajan |
| Poonthenil Kalanthu | Enippadigal | K. V. Mahadevan | S. P. Balasubrahmanyam, P. Susheela |
| Aadatha Manamum | Kalathur Kannamma | R. Sudarsanam | A. M. Rajah, P. Susheela |
| Sonnadhellam | Paadha Kaanikkai | Viswanathan–Ramamoorthy | P. Susheela, L. R. Eswari |
| Naan Paadum Paadalukku | Raga Bandhangal | Kunnakudi Vaidyanathan | Sirkazhi G. Sivachidambaram, S. Janaki |
| Malarae Kurinji Malarae | Dr. Siva | M. S. Viswanathan | K. J. Yesudas, S. Janaki |
| Oru Aalayamaagum | Sumathi En Sundari | M. S. Viswanathan | P. Susheela |
| Jal Jal Jalenum | Paasam | M. S. Viswanathan | P. Susheela |
| Dheivam Thantha Veedu | Aval Oru Thodar Kathai | M. S. Viswanathan | K. J. Yesudas |
| Kadavul Amaithu Vaitha | Aval Oru Thodar Kathai | M. S. Viswanathan | S. P. Balasubrahmanyam |
| Gowri Manohariyai Kanden | Mazhalai Pattalam | M. S. Viswanathan | S. P. Balasubrahmanyam, Vani Jairam |
| Agayam kanatha | Alaya Deepam | M. S. Viswanathan | Vani Jairam |
| Kaalai Maalai Paadu Paadu | Gnana Paravai | M. S. Viswanathan | K. J. Yesudas, K. S. Chithra |
| Kannaa Varuvaayaa | Manathil Uruthi Vendum | Ilayaraja | K. J. Yesudas, K. S. Chithra |
| Muthamizh Kaviyae (Ragam Dharmavati touches) | Dharmathin Thalaivan | Ilayaraja | K. J. Yesudas, K. S. Chithra |
| En Vaanilay (Has more of Patdeep) | Johnny | Ilayaraja | Jency Anthony |
| Dhoorathil Naan | Nizhalgal | Ilayaraja | S. Janaki |
| Chinna Chinna Vanna Kuyil | Mouna Ragam | Ilayaraja | S. Janaki |
| O Endhan | Unakkaagave Vaazhgiren | Ilayaraja | S. Janaki |
| Isaiyin Deivam | Maragatha Veenai | Ilayaraja | S. Janaki |
| Ponvaanam Panneer Thoovuthu | Indru Nee Nalai Naan | Ilayaraja | S. Janaki |
| Thalampoove Kannurangu | Indru Nee Nalai Naan | Ilayaraja | S. P. Balasubrahmanyam, S. Janaki, Uma Ramanan |
| Bhoopalam Isaikkum | Thooral Ninnu Pochchu | Ilayaraja | K. J. Yesudas, Uma Ramanan |
| Paadum Vanambadi | Naan Paadum Paadal | Ilayaraja | S. P. Balasubrahmanyam |
| Oru Kaaviam | Aruvadai Naal | Ilayaraja | Illayaraja |
| Katha Pola Thonum | Veera Thalattu | Ilayaraja | Illayaraja |
| Raja Magal Roja Malar | Pillai Nila | Ilayaraja | P. Jayachandran, S. Janaki |
| Adhi Kaalai Nilave | Urudhi Mozhi | Ilayaraja | P. Jayachandran, S. Janaki |
| Anbe Vaa Arugile | Kilipetchu Ketkava | Ilayaraja | K. J. Yesudas, S. Janaki |
| Then Poove | Anbulla Rajinikanth | Ilayaraja | S. P. Balasubrahmanyam, S. Janaki |
| Santhana Kaatre | Thanikattu Raja | Ilayaraja | S. P. Balasubrahmanyam, S. Janaki |
| Solai Poovil Malai Thenral | Vellai Roja | Ilayaraja | S. P. Balasubrahmanyam, S. Janaki |
| Maanguyilae | Karakattakkaran | Ilayaraja | S. P. Balasubrahmanyam, S. Janaki |
| Ennathaan Sugamo | Mappillai | Ilayaraja | S. P. Balasubrahmanyam, S. Janaki |
| Maalai Ennai Vaaduthu | Pookkalai Parikkatheergal | T. Rajendar | S. P. Balasubrahmanyam, S. Janaki |
| Roja Roja | Kadhalar Dhinam | A. R. Rahman | P. Unnikrishnan |
| Enna Solla Pogirai | Kandukondain Kandukondain | A. R. Rahman | Shankar Mahadevan |
| Vidai Kodu Engal Naadae | Kannathil Muthamittal | A. R. Rahman | M. S. Viswanathan, Balram, Febi Mani, A. R. Reihana, Manikka Vinayagam |
| Malaiyorum Kuyil | Inaindha Kaigal | Manoj–Gyan | Deepan Chakravarthy, Vidhya |
| Sakalakala Vallavane | Pammal K. Sambandam | Deva | Hariharan, Sujatha Mohan |
| Silu Silu Siluvena Kaathu (Ragam Dharmavathi touches in Charanam) | Kizhakku Karai | Deva | K. S. Chithra |
| Vizhiyum Vizhiyum | Sadhurangam | Vidyasagar | Madhu Balakrishnan, Harini |
| Aasai Aasai(Charanam only) | Dhool | Vidyasagar | Shankar Mahadevan, Sujatha Mohan |
| Kolaikara Analatchu En Muchu | Thambi Vettothi Sundaram | Vidyasagar | Karthik, Kalyani |
| Vanvillin Vannam | Thendral | Vidyasagar | Sadhana Sargam |
| En Nenjil | Baana Kaathadi | Yuvan Shankar Raja | Sadhana Sargam |
| Vennmegam Pennaga | Yaaradi Nee Mohini | Yuvan Shankar Raja | Hariharan |
| Aarariraro | Raam | Yuvan Shankar Raja | K. J. Yesudas |
| Nijama Nijama | Bose | Yuvan Shankar Raja | KK, Shreya Ghoshal |
| Kadhal Vanoli (starting Male voice in Ragam Reethigowla) | Album | Karthik Raja | Sujatha Mohan, Harish Raghavendra |
| Penn Oruthi | Gemini | Bharadwaj | S. P. Balasubrahmanyam |
| Kaadhal Mazhaiye | Jay Jay | Bharadwaj | Srinivas |
| Alwarpettai Aaluda/Andava | Vasool Raja MBBS | Bharadwaj | Kamal Haasan, VNB |
| Mailaanji Mailaanji | Namma Veettu Pillai | D. Imman | Shreya Ghoshal, Pradeep Kumar |
| Sundari Penne | Oru Oorla Rendu Raja | D. Imman | Shreya Ghoshal |
| Kannana Kanney | Viswasam | D. Imman | Sid Sriram |

=== Language : Telugu ===
| Song | Movie | Composer | Singers |
|---|---|---|---|
| Aahasakhi Ee Vaname | Uma Chandi Gowri Sankarula Katha | Pendyala (composer) | P. Susheela |
| Naa Madhi Paadina | Pavitra Hrudayalu | T. Chalapathi Rao | Ghantasala (musician) |
| Nee Adugulona adugu vesi | Poola Rangadu (1967 film) | Ghantasala (musician) | Ghantasala (musician) & P. Susheela |

Below song is a traditional saint Tyagaraja Gowrimanohari Rendition used in film which sound similar to Patdeep(Hindustani)

=== Language : Telugu ===
| Song | Movie | Composer | Singers |
|---|---|---|---|
| Guruleka Etuvanti Guniki | Tyagayya (1981 film) | K. V. Mahadevan | S. P. Balasubrahmanyam |

=== Organization and relationships ===
Related ragas:

- Dhanashree, Dhani, Bhimpalasi, Hamsakinkini, Gourimanohari, Madhuvanti
- Thaat: Kafi

'Nyaas'( notes of rest): g, P and N

'Prakity'( behavior): Chanchal( fast).
