= Katkai Silarpur =

Village in Haryana, India

Silarpur is a village in Narnaul Tehsil, Mahendragarh district, Haryana, located on Mahendragarh - Ateli road on a distance of 6 km from Ateli. Neighbouring villages include Katkai, Duloth Jat, Bhodi, Mohanpur.
