= Sharmeelee =

1971 Indian Hindi-language film produced by Subodh Mukherjee

- Directed by: Samir Ganguly
- Written by: Gulshan Nanda (story)
- Produced by: Subodh Mukherjee
- Starring: Shashi Kapoor; Raakhee
- Cinematography: N. V. Srinivas
- Edited by: V. K. Naik
- Music by: S. D. Burman
- Release date: 1971
- Running time: 2 hours 44 min
- Country: India
- Language: Hindi
- Box office: ₹2.6 crore (equivalent to ₹124 crore or US$13 million in 2023) (Nett.)

Sharmeelee (trans. Shy) is a 1971 Indian Hindi-language romantic film produced by Subodh Mukherjee and directed by Samir Ganguly. The film stars Shashi Kapoor, Raakhee, Narendra Nath, Nazir Hussain, Iftekhar, S N Banerjee, Anita Guha, Asit Sen. Raakhee played a double role in this film, and its success helped make her one of the decade's top leading ladies in Hindi films. The film also marked the debut of Ranjeet. The film starts on a romantic track, but after halfway takes a brilliant turn towards mystery and thriller genre.

== Plot ==
Kanchan (Rakhee) is a shy, demure young women who finds solace in nature and bonding with animals rather than people. The only other person she speaks with candidly is the town priest, Father Joseph (Nasir Hussain), who is lovingly called 'Baba'. When a family from Delhi arrives at Kanchan's home to see her for marriage, we see a new side to her. She is witty and vivacious, and the family immediately takes a liking to her. However, it is soon revealed that that was not Kanchan, but Kamini, her twin sister. The family rejects the marriage prospect unless it is for Kamini and leaves. Kanchan is disheartened as most of her marriage prospects ends this way. Kamini soon leaves for a trip with her friends to Kashmir.

In Kashmir, Kamini and her friends are stuck in a cabin on the hill due to heavy snowstorm at night. The cabin steward informs them that there is no food supply in the cabin or anywhere nearby, except for an army base, where only military personnel are allowed. Kamini somehow sneaks into the base to steal few supplies, where she hears Captain Ajit Kapoor (Shashi Kapoor) reciting poetry. She is caught stealing and a chase ensues. Ajit gets hold of Kamini and learns of her situation and assists her to get the supplies to the cabin with the help of the army camp. Kamini and Ajit are immediately smitten with each other. But, the group leaves the next morning before Ajit could learn her name. Back in Kanchan and Kamini's hometown, Baba receives news that his foster son is returning home for a visit, who is revealed to be Captain Ajit. After catching up, Baba brings up the topic of Ajit's marriage and says he knows just the girl. Ajit tells him about his meeting with the unknown girl in Kashmir, but agrees to see the girl for marriage, as he thinks Kamini is lost to him, just like a sweet dream. When he sees Kanchan, he mistakes her to be his lost love and agrees to the marriage in glee. Kanchan being the hopeless romantic she is, is overjoyed that he loves her as much. However, when Kamini makes it back from her trip she learns of her sister's marriage and wants to meet her prospective brother-in-law. Kamini and Ajit see each other and realize the misunderstanding and promptly informs Baba about it. Kanchan and Ajit's marriage is broken off and Kamini is enganged to Ajit instead.

A heartbroken Kanchan licks her wounds while Kamini and Ajit are in the bliss of love, counting down the days to their wedding. One day, on a date at the club pool, they run into Kamini's ex-lover, Kundan (Ranjeet). After Ajit fights him off, Kundan is summoned by his boss Tiger (Narendra Nath), a criminal mastermind, who berates him for going after love, which he believes is frivolous, but reassures him that he will get Kamini back for Kundan with the ulterior motive of using her for his ploys. However, blind with jealousy, Kundan lures Kamini to meet him by sending her a letter in the guise of Ajit. Kamini taken aback runs away from him as he blackmails and assaults her. Kamini finds a car to get away with but Kundan shoots at her. In the heat of the moment, Kamini runs over Kundan multiple times, killing him. A police car passes by while Kamini pretends to fix the car with the dead body beneath it. Thinking she is in the clear, Kamini drags Kundan's corpse into the car and escapes. The police car spots her speeding away and chases her. But, at the end of a blocked tunnel, Kamini loses control of the car, and by the time the cops arrive, they see her car barreling down the hillside into the river, bursting into flames.

On the day of the wedding, Kamini's family is made aware by police of her death and involvement with Kundan, who was a wanted criminal, and also his murder by her hands. Devastated by the death and deeds of one daughter and the possibility of spinsterhood for the innocent Kanchan, her mother agrees to the housemaid's idea of passing off Kanchan as Kamini and getting her married to Ajit. Kanchan refuses this, but her mother emotionally coerces her to agree. Still trying to not deceive Ajit, Kanchan writes a note to him stating the truth and that he should only arrive for the ceremony if he is willing to accept her and this relation. She sends the note through Lily, Baba's housekeeper's daughter, but Kanchan's mother intercepts her and slyly swaps the envelope's content. The unaware Ajit arrives and the wedding proceeds. Kanchan relieved and happy that Ajit has accepted her, dreams of a joyous and loving life with him. But this joy is short lived when in their wedding night, Ajit calls her 'Kamini'. She immediately spills the truth of her identity and Kamini's death. Ajit, heartbroken and enraged that he has been made a fool of, rebuffs Kanchan, and blames her for everything. He drives off to the army camp, drinking himself into a state of desolation. Back at home Baba saves Kanchan after she tries to commit suicide, and learns the truth. He tries to persuade Ajit to accept Kanchan to no avail. When a drunken Ajit gets into a car accident, Kanchan and Baba visit him. Seeing him in anguish and calling out for Kamini, Kanchan decides to pretend to be her to help him recover. Ajit recovers in a quick pace, and Kanchan prepares to leave as she cannot bear to pretend to be someone she is not anymore, to get his love.

Kamini is shown to be alive and in a relationship with Tiger, who had saved her during the ill-fated day of her presumed death. After being saved, she had been working for Tiger to perform shady deals. Relishing in the luxury and already dead for her family and loved ones she did not return to her past life. After the success of a high stake espionage, Tiger kills off his most loyal henchman in front of Kamini to leave no witness to the deal. Realizing that one day that might be her fate, Kamini thinks of a way to escape. Coincidentally, Kanchan and Ajit are at the club, owned by Tiger, on a date. Kamini notices them and wiretapped into their table, learning that her sister is pretending to be her and that Ajit still loves her immensely. Seeing a way out of her doomed fate, she decides to get Ajit back. Back at the army base, Ajit is shown images of Kamini with a long scar on her back, and it is revealed to him that she is a spy for a wanted crime lord. Not wanting to believe this, he verifies the scar on Kanchan's back, who is still in guise of Kamini, and is relieved to see no such scar. He then rushes to Baba demanding that Kanchan be sumitted to him for arrest, as he thinks she was the one in the pictures. Baba frustratedly reveals to him that the one he has been beside all along was Kanchan. Realizing her love and all the sacrifices she has made for him, Ajit rushes back home to Kanchan. Meanwhile, Kamini meets Kanchan and hoodwinks her into believing she had run away to allow for Kanchan to get her love, Ajit, but got embroiled into a horrible fate. Kanchan, believing no one would love or miss her, agrees to swap places and go with Tiger to Delhi in her stead. Ajit reaches home and begs 'Kanchan' for forgiveness and tells that he has realized that the one he truly loves is her. But, with 'Kanchan' acting strange and contradicting her earlier mannerisms, he quickly uncovers that she is Kamini. They get into scuffle, where Kamini accidentally shoots herself. Before succumbing, she tells Ajit to save her sister, who is about to board a private plane to Delhi with Tiger at night. Ajit reaches the airstrip at the nick of time, and gets on the plane to save Kanchan. In the ensuing fight, the pilot is shot and a blast, due to the bag given by Kamini to Kanchan, kills Tiger. Ajit and Kanchan jump off the crashing plane and land safely. After a few years, they are shown to be happily married with a child, as Kanchan had dreamt of.

== Cast ==
- Shashi Kapoor as Captain Ajit Kapoor
- Raakhee as Kanchan / Kamini (double role)
- Ranjeet as Kundan
- Iftekhar as Colonel
- Nazir Hussain as Father Joseph
- Narendranath as Tiger
- Jayshree T. as dancer / singer

== Soundtrack ==
The soundtrack of Sharmeelee was an instant hit with the Indian audience, with songs composed by S. D. Burman, written by Neeraj and sung by Kishore Kumar, Lata Mangeshkar, Asha Bhosle. The songs had featured on the Binaca Geetmala top 10 songs of 1971. The track "Khilte Hain Gul Yahan", sung by Kishore Kumar and Lata Mangeshkar as separate solos in the movie, has been set in the raag Bhimpalasi (known as Abheri in Carnatic Music), while "Megha Chhaye Aadhi Raat" is set in the raga Patdeep (Close to Gourimanohari of Carnatic Music).

Sharmeelee

Soundtrack album by S. D. Burman
- Released: 1971
- Genre: Feature film soundtrack
- Length: 32:00
- Language: Hindi
- Label: Saregama
- Producer: S. D. Burman

S. D. Burman chronology
Naya Zamana (1971)	Sharmeelee (1971)	Chaitali (1971)

Songs
No.	Title	Singer(s)	Length
1.	"Khilte Hain Gul Yahan (Raga Bhimpalasi)"	Kishore Kumar	4:02
2.	"O Meri Sharmilee"	Kishore Kumar	3:58
3.	"Kaise Kahen Ham (Raga Tilang)"	Kishore Kumar	3:57
4.	"Aaj Madhosh Hua Jaye Re"	Kishore Kumar & Lata Mangeshkar	4:54
5.	"Khilte Hain Gul Yahan (Raga Bhimpalasi)"	Lata Mangeshkar	4:50
6.	"Megha Chhaye Aadhi Raat (Raga Patdeep)"	Lata Mangeshkar	4:12
7.	"Reshmi Ujala Hai Makhmali Andhera"	Asha Bhosle	6:05
Total length:			32:00

== Box office ==
Sharmeelee was declared a "Semi-hit" by Box Office India. Sharmeelee had powerful and promising performances by the lead actors, Shashi Kapoor and Raakhee, and had received both critical as well as commercial success. It had netted approximately ₹ 2,60,00,000.
