= Kārākāt =

Karakat Kārākāt
- Village
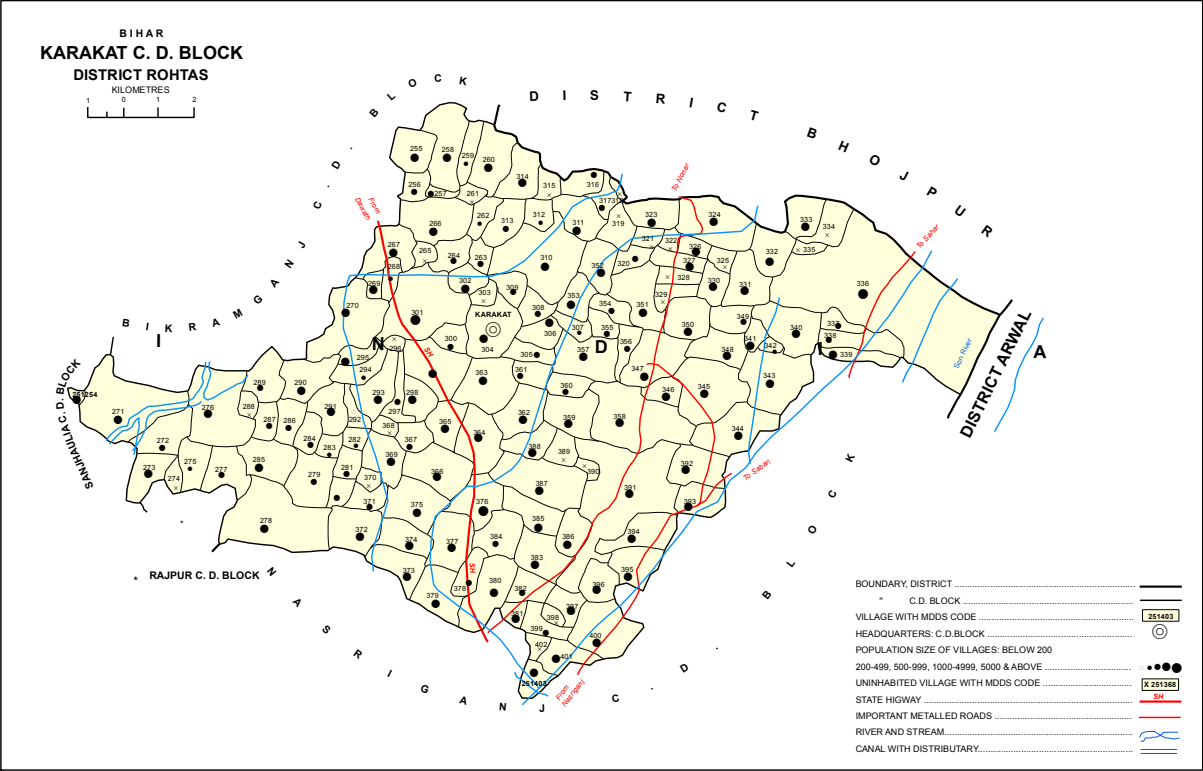

- Location in Bihar, India
- Coordinates: 25.18234°N 84.28869°E
- Country: India
- State: Bihar
- District: Rohtas

Population (2011)
  - Total: 2,563

Languages
  - Official: Hindi
- Time zone: UTC+5:30 (IST)
- PIN: 802212

Kārākāt is a village and corresponding Community Development Block in Rohtas district of Bihar, India. As of 2011, the village of Karakat has a population of 2563, in 400 households; the total population of Karakat block is 209,284.

== Demographics ==
The population of Karakat block increased from 179,195 in 2001 to 209,284 in 2011, a 16.8% increase. This was a slightly decadal lower growth rate than the average of Rohtas district.

As of 2011, Karakat block had a sex ratio of 920 females for every 1000 males, which was about average for Rohtas district. The ratio was slightly higher among the 0-6 age group, with 926 females for every 1000 males. There were 37,804 members of scheduled castes in the block, representing 18.06% of the population, which was about average for Rohtas district. Members of scheduled tribes in the block numbered 455, or 0.22% of the population, which was somewhat lower than the district average 1.12%. The literacy rate in Karakat block was 73.94%, which was lower than the district average of 73.37%. Literacy was higher in men (85.26%) than in women (61.61%); the corresponding 23.65% gender gap was the highest in Rohtas district.

=== Employment ===
A majority of the population of Karakat block is employed in agriculture. In 2011, 24.97% of the workforce was employed as cultivators who owned or leased their own land, and 46.82% of the workforce was employed as agricultural labourers who worked someone else's land for wages. A further 8.81% was employed as household industry workers, the highest proportion in Rohtas, and the remaining 17.97% were engaged in other forms of work.

=== Amenities ===
All 128 inhabited villages in Karakat block, including Karakat itself, have access to clean drinking water, but none have tap water; instead, water is supplied by well and hand pump. 103 of the villages (80.47%) had schools, which served 94.14% of the block's population. 61 had medical facilities, serving 59.37% of the population, which was above the Rohtas district average of 35.63% served by medical facilities. 36 villages had post offices. 60 villages had telephone service, serving 62.11% of the block's population; this was about average for Rohtas district. 72 villages had transport communications (bus, rail, or navigable waterways). 20 villages had banks, and 19 had agricultural credit societies. 82 villages had pucca roads. 118 villages, Karakat among them, had access to electricity; 89.47% of the overall block population had access to electricity.

== Villages ==
Karakat block has 128 inhabited villages and 22 uninhabited ones, for a total of 150 villages:

Village name	Total land area (hectares)	Population (in 2011)
Sajhaulimath	21	1,007
Bharat Kasba	146	1,288
Sugibal	75	663
Jhakar Bigha	46	460
Shahpur	48	736
Munji	229	2,672
Adhaura	66	341
Dehra	168	1,291
Karam Kiliya	63	0
Murarpur	57	397
Mahuari	63	518
Dhanchhuha	83	767
Punai Dih	39	0
Mohanpur	207	2,675
Karakat (capital)	151	2,563
Jaisari English	55	304
Misrauliya	35	1,007
Jaisari	292	3,787
Bensagar	422	3,827
Khairadih	154	738
Bhopatpur	121	1,079
Baisadih	26	0
Gopalpur	106	453
Itharia	350	2,646
Karup	150	900
Amratha	510	4,050
Nanhu	166	945
Karma	39	640
Banye Dehri	63	833
Subiya	45	280
Ahan	45	418
Tirma Chaughadi	71	908
Gachhai	159	1,379
Chaughari	91	890
Kulhariya	76	666
Chauri	32	0
Majhariya	129	771
Nawada	151	2,032
Beiwai	136	1,780
Sakhua	44	58
Manik Parasi	143	1,631
Padumanpur	92	381
Sahri	48	3,090
Jaisari English	29	0
Dharmagat Parasi	80	931
Gorakh Parasi	110	1,120
Itwa	205	1,315
Biraini	65	782
Motha	408	5,420
Pipra	75	1,159
Narayandih	37	0
Raghunathpur	229	2,613
Gera	66	791
Chandi	82	1,337
Rampur	53	288
Kishundasdih	73	692
Sansar Dehri	66	869
Kurur	408	3,159
Chiksil	136	2,006
Bedwalia	54	378
Pardiha	107	811
Duari	163	1,730
Manidih	62	0
Mangra	68	899
Thumhia	74	777
Daudpur	25	0
Khirsa	83	0
Chamar Dehri	56	655
Mathurapur	42	0
Ahibaranpur	29	0
Panredih	94	1,552
Sakla	258	4,555
Kumbhi	34	0
Kopa	39	1,238
Kopa	64	1,345
Kopa	60	0
Kopa	66	0
Kechua	82	1,527
Bharkundia	168	1,375
Dhorhandih	134	1,398
Niranjanpur	104	2,263
Chak Niranjan	84	0
Mathia	33	0
Danwar	1465	5,174
Gujru	51.23	821
Soni	146	568
Ibrahimpur	84	1,855
Sohda	199	2,322
Bharetha Rampur	73	1,086
Tarwa	20	222
Amona	308	4,034
Belarhi	250	1,100
Samhuta	289	3,458
Sarbanand Dehri	68	1,122
Kusi	214	1,366
Koni	126	1,182
Lewa	76	654
Malpura	148	1,624
Sonbarsa	208	1,958
Chaugai	110	1,939
Hariharpur	110	1,049
Barmadih	61	582
Badladih	61	679
Bharthadih	64	671
Kirhi	217	2,014
Parsar	411	4,023
Hatia	165	1,612
Kurawan	78	798
Nawadih	72	823
Amaura	166	1,792
Lori Bandh	219	1,052
Jamua	179	1,508
Karup	115	2,672
Nad	179	1,558
Nok Parasi	76	594
Shah Parasi	34	0
Gamhariya	150	2,256
Budhai Dehri	27.8	0
Titho	65	570
Dhawani	180	2,494
Sukhara	146	1,203
Chilha	98	1,501
Bad	234	1,979
Gorari	202	5,621
Kaeth Bahuara	179	1,498
Kanh Bahuara	89	713
Bara Dih	166	4,272
Zorawarpur	222	2,486
Karma	46	2,597
Kesuari	94	802
Gadura	153	1,609
Tenua	115	735
Denri	167	1,778
Jagdishpur	94	1,236
Burhawal	291	4,914
Paraiya	106	1,504
Gajpatipur	72	0
Deo Arazi	27	0
Deo	761	4,699
Dhanhara	172	2,209
Osawan	144	1,952
Gharwasdih	132	2,074
Paharma	134	2,522
Nawadih	101	1,363
Dahiari	78	1,634
Saidanpur	32	0
Sikaria English	82	528
Sikaria	241	3,961
Chandipatti	109	1,724
Asmardih	44	0
Basdiha	82	1,542

== See also ==
- Karakat (Lok Sabha constituency)
