= Bale Pandiya (1962 film) =

1962 film by B. R. Panthulu

- Theatrical release poster
- Directed by: B. R. Panthulu
- Screenplay by: Dada Mirasi
- Story by: Maa. Raa. Joshi
- Produced by: B. R. Panthulu
- Starring: Sivaji Ganesan; M. R. Radha; Devika
- Cinematography: V. Ramamoorthy
- Edited by: R. Devarajan
- Music by: Viswanathan–Ramamoorthy
- Production company: Padmini Pictures
- Release date: May 26, 1962
- Running time: 156 minutes
- Country: India
- Language: Tamil

Bale Pandiya (transl. Bravo Pandiya) is a 1962 Indian Tamil-language comedy film produced and directed by B. R. Panthulu. The film stars Sivaji Ganesan, M. R. Radha and Devika, with K. Balaji, Vasanthi and Sandhya in supporting roles. It revolves around the title character having to evade a lookalike wanting to kill him for insurance money.

The story of Bale Pandiya was written by Maa. Raa. and Joshi, while the screenplay was written by Dada Mirasi. Cinematography was handled by V. Ramamoorthy, and the editing by R. Devarajan. The music was scored by Viswanathan–Ramamoorthy. The film stars Ganesan in three distinct roles, and Radha in two. Production began in early May 1962, ended in the middle of the month, and the film was released on the 26th of the same month.

== Plot ==
Pandiyan is an innocent young man who leads a meaningless life. He tries to commit suicide, but Kabali, a con artist, convinces Pandiyan to postpone his suicide for a month. Kabali has a sidekick Marudhu who resembles Pandiyan. Kabali plans to get an insurance policy in Pandiyan's name and get all the insurance money when Pandiyan commits suicide after a month. But Pandiyan falls for Geetha, and drops his suicide attempt. Geetha's father Amirdhalingam is a lookalike of Kabali. Upset that his insurance plan will not work, Kabali tries to kill Pandiyan multiple times, but Pandiyan keeps escaping. Pandiyan cures a young woman Vasanthi from her insanity and her rich father as a token of gratitude adopts Pandiyan as his son. Kabali finally captures Pandiyan and tosses him into the sea.

Pandiyan's elder brother Shankar lives with his greedy wife. Hearing the news of Pandiyan's death, she hatches a plan to fake Shankar's death. Shankar would then pose as Pandiyan who escaped from the sea and get access to all his newly acquired wealth. Both Shankar and Marudhu start posing as the escaped Pandiyan, confusing everyone. The real Pandiyan, having been rescued by fishermen, also joins the other two and pandemonium ensues. Kabali shoots Marudhu dead, mistaking him for Pandiyan, and later kills himself out of guilt. The families are reunited.

== Cast ==
Male cast

- Sivaji Ganesan as Pandiya, Marudhu, and Shankar (triple role)
- M. R. Radha as Kabali and Amirthalingam Pillai (dual role)
- K. Balaji as Ravi

Female cast

- Devika as Geetha
- Vasanthi as Vasanthi
- Sandhya as Kanagam

== Production ==
Shortly before his trip to the United States in May 1962, Sivaji Ganesan had signed up for a film titled Bale Pandiya, produced and directed by B. R. Panthulu under Padmini Pictures. He visited the studio on the second day of the month, and left on the twelfth after the film was completed. Ganesan believed himself to hold the "world record of completing a film in eleven days time." He played three distinct roles, while his co-star M. R. Radha played two roles. Ganesan spoke in Madras Bashai to play his characters. The story was written by Maa. Raa. and Joshi, while the screenplay was written by Dada Mirasi. Cinematography was handled by V. Ramamoorthy, and the editing by R. Devarajan. According to Panthulu's son Ravishankar, the entire film was completed in 15 days, with shooting going on simultaneously in three places. The final length of the film was 4,449 metres (14,596 ft).

== Soundtrack ==
Music was composed by Viswanathan–Ramamoorthy, with lyrics by Kannadasan. "Neeye Unakku Endrum" is set in the Carnatic raga known as Suddha Dhanyasi (Dhani in Hindustani classical music), and attained popularity. The song "Vaazha Ninaithal" was recreated as the theme song for the Sun TV series Ilakkiya.

Song	Singers	Duration
"Aadhi Manidhan"	P. B. Sreenivas, K. Jamuna Rani	03:56
"Athi Kai Kai"	T. M. Soundararajan, P. B. Sreenivas, P. Susheela, K. Jamuna Rani	05:23
"Naan Enna Solliviten"	T. M. Soundararajan	03:58
"Neeye Unakku Endrum"	T. M. Soundararajan, M. Raju	06:32
"Vaazha Ninaithaal"	T. M. Soundararajan, P. Susheela	04:45
"Yaarai Enge Vaipadhendru"	T. M. Soundararajan	03:35

== Release and reception ==
Bale Pandiya was released on 26 May 1962. Sekar and Sundar of Ananda Vikatan praised the film for its comedy and Ganesan's triple role performance. Kanthan of Kalki, however, gave a less positive review, praising Ganesan and Radha's multiple role performances, but criticising the direction and cinematography.
