= Bhimpalasi =

Hindustani classical raga

- Thaat: Kafi
- Type: Audava-sampurna
- Time of day: Early afternoon, 12–3 pm
- Arohana: Ṉ̣ S G̱ M P Ṉ Ṡ
- Avarohana: Ṡ Ṉ D P M G̱ R S
- Pakad: Ṉ̣ S M ❟ M G̱ ❟ P M G̱ R S
- Vadi: M
- Samavadi: S
- Similar: Dhanashri; Dhani; Patdip; Pilu

Bhimpalasi or Bheempalasi (also known as Bheempalas or Bheempalashree) is a Hindustani classical raga. It belongs to the Kafi thaat and follows the audava-sampurna structure. Bhimpalasi is known to be a modern representation of the ancient Dhanashri family of ragas. It is traditionally performed in the early afternoon and it's performance emits a serene and solemn mood.

== Theory ==
Bhimpalasi belongs to the Kafi thaat (parent scale) and is an audava-sampurna raga. It uses five notes in ascent and all seven notes in descent, with flat (komal) Ga and komal Ni throughout.

=== Arohana and avaroha ===
It uses five notes in ascent and all seven notes in descent, with flat (komal) Ga and komal Ni throughout.

- Arohana (ascent): Ṉ̣ S G̱ M P Ṉ Ṡ (Note: Alternate notations: Carnatic: Ṇ₂ S G₂ M₁ P N₂ Ṡ; Western: B♭ C E♭ F G B♭ C)
- Avaroha (descent): Ṡ Ṉ D P M G̱ R S (Note: Alternate notations: Carnatic: Ṡ N₂ D₂ P M₁ G₂ R₂ S; Western: C B♭ A G F E♭ D C)

=== Vadi and samavadi ===
The principal note (vadi) of Raga Bhimpalasi is Ma, and its secondary note (samvadi) is Sa. In Bhimpalasi, Ma and Sa form a perfect fourth.

- Vadi (principal): Ma
- Samavadi (secondary): Sa

=== Pakad ===
The characteristic phrase (pakad) of Bhimpalasi is:

- N̲ S M, M g, P M g R S

=== Behavior ===
Bhimpalasi's melodic identity is not only defined by its scale but by characteristic movements and phrases. Ascending passages typically begin on the lower flat Ni, move to Sa and then expanding into Ma: N̲ S M or N̲ S g M. Lingering on Ma at this point in the ascent helps to establish the raga's identity in performance.

A defining feature of this raga is the slow glide (meend) from Pa or Ma down to komal Ga, accompanied by a subtle oscillation (andolan) on Ga. A typical phrase expansion follows the pattern N̲ S M, M g, g M P M g, M P M g R S, repeatedly returning to rest on Ma before resolving to Sa.

In descent, Re and Dha are used but are treated as passing notes (alpatva) rather than points of focus. Bhatkhande notes that pausing or sustaining directly on Re or Dha creates an unmelodious effect, therefore musicians embed them within fluid descending glides such as M g R S or n D P M.

The raga used both flat (komal) Ni and flat (komal) Ga. Re and Dha are skipped in arohana (ascending) passages, but are given due importance during the avaroha (descending) passages.

Use of dhaivat(dha) and rishabh(ray) is symmetrical in that both are approached via the succeeding notes (D from Ṉ, and R from G̱).G̱ is sung with a kaṇ-svara (grace note) of M. Similarly, Ṉ is sung with a kaṇ-svara from S.

=== Samay ===
Bhimpalasi is traditionally performed during the third prahar (early afternoon) of the day which is around 12 pm to 3 pm. Some sources suggest it to be performed at the fourth prahar (later afternoon) of the day. Typically in Hindustani classical music, ragas that omit Re and Dha in the ascent are often grouped together in the early afternoon window of the day.

=== Rasa ===
Bhimpalasi is described as a peaceful, serene, and solemn raga. Bhatkhande characterizes the raga as possessing qualities of gambhirnada which means means deep and serious due to the unconstrained (mukta) treatment of Ma. Consistent with the other Dhanashri ragas, Bhimpalasi contains undertones of longing and feeling absence (viraha).

=== Relationship with similar ragas ===
==== Dhanashri ====
Raga Dhanashri is also belongs Kafi thaat and shares a similar scale structure to Bhimpalasi. It also omits Re and Dha in the ascent while using both flat (komal) Ga and flat (komal) Ni. The key distinction between the two is in the vadi: Bhimpalasi emphasizes an unconstrained Ma while Dhanashri uses Pa and requires Ma to be restrained (maryadit) so it doesn't dominate. Bhatkhande noticed that audiences would "undoubtedly" understand Dhanashri as Bhimpalasi during performances without understanding the differences in vadi. Because of this, Dhanashri gradually disappeared from common concert performances. Now, the most common variant of Dhanashri is Puriya Dhanashri of the Purvi thaat.

==== Dhani ====
Dhani is a pentatonic raga that omits Re and Dha in both ascent and descent (audava-audava) while Bhimpalasi includes them in the ascent. Dhani emphasizes flat (komal) Ga as its vadi which is a stark contrast to Bhimpalasi's tranquil and serious aesthetic.

==== Patdeep ====
Patdeep shares Bhimpalasi's ascent, descent, and gliding behavior, but it uses the natural (shuddha) Ni instead of the flat (komal) Ni. This subtle difference fundamentally alters the raga's character.

==== Pilu ====
Pilu is a light and highly imaginative raga that draws from all twelve semitones. Musicians often begin their performances with Bhimpalasi phrases before resolving to Pilu-specific characteristics.

== Compositions ==
A number of traditional compositions (bandishes) have been documented in different tempos (laya) and rhythmic cycles (talas). Performers typically with a slow alap or composition to establish the raga's solemn characteristics before singing the main composition.

Bandish	Laya	Tala	Writer
Jā, jā re apane mandiravā	Madhya	Teental	Sadarang
Gāo bajāo sab mil atā umaṅg so	-	Ektal	Gokulotsavji Maharaj
Eri man le gayo bain bajay	Vilambit		Janakidas

== Film songs ==
=== Language: Hindi ===
Song	Movie	Composer	Singers
"Bina Madhur Madhur Kachhu Bol"	Ram Rajya (1943 film)	Shankar Rao Vyas	Saraswati Rane
"Duniya Se Ji Ghabra Gaya"	Laila Majnu(1953 film)	Ghulam Mohammed (composer)	Lata Mangeshkar & Talat Mahmood
Ye Na Thi Hamri Kismat	Mirza Ghalib (film)	Ghulam Mohammed (composer)	Suraiya
Khilte Hain Gul Yahan	Sharmeelee	Sachin Dev Burman	Kishore Kumar & Lata Mangeshkar
Khoya Khoya Chand	Kala Bazar	Sachin Dev Burman	Mohammed Rafi
Man Mor Hua Matavala	Afsar(1948 film)	S. D. Burman	Suraiya
Tumhi Ne Mujhko Prem Sikhya	Manmohan (film)	Ashok Ghosh	Surendra (actor) & Bibbo (actress)
Jhanakar Payala Ki Tose Binati Kare	Nag Devata(1962 film)	S. N. Tripathi	Asha Bhosle
Eri Main To Premdivani	Naubahar(1952 film)	Roshan (music director)	Lata Mangeshkar
Yeh Zindagi Usiki Hai	Anarkali	C. Ramchandra	Lata Mangeshkar
Mere Man Ka Bavara Panchhi	Amardeep (1958 film)	C. Ramchandra	Lata Mangeshkar
O Nirdai Pritam	Stree (1961 film)	C. Ramchandra	Lata Mangeshkar
Aaj Mere Man Sakhi Bansuri Bajaye Koi	Aan	Naushad	Lata Mangeshkar & Chorus
Tere Sadke Balama	Amar (1954 film)	Naushad	Lata Mangeshkar
Kuch Dil Ne Kaha	Anupama (1966 film)	Hemant Kumar	Lata Mangeshkar
Aa Neele Gagan Tale Pya	Badshah (1954 film)	Shankar–Jaikishan	Lata Mangeshkar & Hemant Kumar
Masoom Chehra	Dil Tera Diwana (1962 film)	Shankar–Jaikishan	Lata Mangeshkar & Mohammed Rafi
Naino Me Badra Chhaye	Mera Saaya	Madan Mohan	Lata Mangeshkar
Naghma-O-Sher Ki Saughaat	Gazal (1964 film)	Madan Mohan	Lata Mangeshkar
"Samay O Dhire Chalo"	Rudaali	Bhupen Hazarika	Asha Bhosle
"Maine Chand Aur Sitaron Ki"	Chandrakanta(1956 film)	Datta Naik	Mohammed Rafi
Main Garibon Ka Dil	Abe-Hayat(1955 film)	Sardar Malik	Hemant Kumar
Dil Ke Tukade Tukkade	Dada (1979 film)	Usha Khanna	K. J. Yesudas
Hum Katha Sunate (Luv Kush Title Track)	Luv Kush (TV Series)	Ravindra Jain	Kavitha Krishnamurthy, Hemlatha
Dil Mein Tujhe Bithake	Fakira	Ravindra Jain	Lata Mangeshkar
Bole Mora Kangna	Bandish	Anand-Milind	Alka Yagnik & Kumar Sanu
Tu Cheez Badi Hai Mast Mast	Mohra	Viju Shah	Udit Narayan & Kavita Krishnamurthy
Eli Re Eli	Yaadein (2001 film)	Anu Malik	Hema Sardesai & Alka Yagnik & Kavita Krishnamurti
Tu mile Dil khile	Criminal	M.M.Keeravani (a) Maragathamani (a) M.M. Kreem	Kumar Sanu, Alka Yagnik
Guzarish (loosely based)	Ghajini	A. R. Rahman	Javed Ali
Jiya Re (Loosely based)	Jab Tak Hain Jaan	A. R. Rahman	Neeti Mohan
Kabhi Kabhi Aditi (loosely baed)	Jaane Tu... Ya Jaane Na	A. R. Rahman	Rashid Ali
Shabba Shabba	Daud (film)	A. R. Rahman	Sonu Nigam & Swarnalatha
Kismat se Tum	Pukar	A. R. Rahman	Sonu Nigam & Anuradha Paudwal
Radha kaise na jale	Lagaan	A. R. Rahman	Udit Narayan & Asha Bhosle
Mere Toh L Lag Gaye	Jolly LLB	Krsna	Bappi Lahiri
Jiya (From "Gunday") (has a slight mix of Kafi as well)	Gunday	Sohail Sen	Arijit Singh
Galti se Mistake (loosely based)	Jagga Jasoos	Pritam Chakraborty	Amit Mishra, Arijit Singh, Shubhanshu Kesharwani
Ishq Jalakar - Kaarvaan (Has a few deviations towards Darbari Kanada at points)	Dhurandhar	Shashwat Sachdev	Muhammad Sadiq, Ranjit Kaur, Hanumankind, Jasmine Sandlas, Sudhir Yaduvanshi, Shashwat Sachdev

=== Language: Tamil ===
Note that the following songs are composed in Abheri, the equivalent of raga Bhimpalasi in Carnatic music.

Song	Movie	Year	Composer	Singer
Yaanai Thandham Pole	Amarakavi	1952	G. Ramanathan, T. A. Kalyanam	M. K. Thyagaraja Bhagavathar, P. Leela
Thanga Nilavil	Thirumanam	1958	S. M. Subbaiah Naidu, T. G. Lingappa	A. M. Rajah, Jikki
Vaarai Nee Vaarai	Manthiri Kumari	1950	G. Ramanathan	Thiruchi Loganathan, Jikki
Kannan Mananilayai	Deivathin Deivam	1962	G. Ramanathan	S. Janaki
Singaravelane Deva	Konjum Salangai	1962	S. M. Subbaiah Naidu	S. Janaki
Kungumam Piranthathu Marathila	Paattondru Ketten	1971	C. Ramchandra	P. B. Sreenivas, P. Suseela
Isai Thamizh	Thiruvilaiyadal	1965	K. V. Mahadevan	T. R. Mahalingam
Kadhalaagi	Thiruvarutchelvar	1967	K. V. Mahadevan	T. M. Soundararajan, Master Maharajan
Gangai Karai Thottam	Vanambadi	1963	K. V. Mahadevan	P. Suseela
Komatha Engal Kulamatha	Saraswati Sabatham	1966	K. V. Mahadevan	P. Suseela
Velodu Vilaiyaadum Murugaiyaa	Chitrangi	1964	Vedha	P. Suseela
Radhaiyin Nenjame	Kanimuthu Paappa	1972	T. V. Raju (Credits Only)	P. Suseela
Nalama Nalama	Ival Oru Pournami	1986	T. K. Ramamoorthy	P. Suseela
Pazhamuthir Solaiyilae	Kuzhandaiyum Deivamum	1965	M. S. Viswanathan	P. Suseela
Raagangal Pathinaaru	Thillu Mullu	1981	M. S. Viswanathan	S. P. Balasubrahmanyam
Poo Malaiyil	Ooty Varai Uravu	1967	M. S. Viswanathan	T. M. Soundararajan, P. Susheela
Malarnthum Malaradha	Pasamalar	1961	Viswanathan–Ramamoorthy	T. M. Soundararajan, P. Susheela
Thendral Urangiya Podhum	Petra Maganai Vitra Annai	1958	Viswanathan–Ramamoorthy	A. M. Rajah & P. Susheela
Anbu Megame	Engamma Sapatham	1974	Vijaya Bhaskar	S. P. Balasubrahmanyam, Vani Jairam
Vanil Vazhum	Uruvangal Maralam	1983	S. V. Ramanan	S. P. Balasubrahmanyam, Vani Jairam
Kuyile Kavikuyile	Kavikkuyil	1977	Illayaraja	S. Janaki
Chendoora Poove	16 Vayathinile	1977	Illayaraja	S. Janaki
Vasantha Kaala Kolangal	Thyagam	1978	Illayaraja	S. Janaki
Naatham En Jeevanae	Kaadhal Oviyam	1982	Illayaraja	S. Janaki
Chinna Chiru Vayathil	Meendum Kokila	1981	Illayaraja	K. J. Yesudas, S. P. Sailaja
Megam Karukkuthu	Anandha Ragam	1982	Illayaraja	K. J. Yesudas, S. Janaki
Velakku Vetcha	Mundhanai Mudichu	1983	Illayaraja	Illayaraja, S. Janaki
Poovae Poochudava	Poove Poochooda Vaa	1985	Illayaraja	K. J. Yesudas(ver 1), K. S. Chithra (ver 2)
Poombaaraiyil Pottu Vaicha	En Uyir Kannamma	1988	Illayaraja	Ilaiyaraaja
Velli Golusu	Pongi Varum Kaveri	1989	Illayaraja	Arunmozhi, K. S. Chithra
Kallidasan Kannadasan	Soorakottai Singakutty		Illayaraja	P. Jayachandran, P. Susheela
Poonkaaviyam (Natbhairavi in Charanam)	Karpoora Mullai	1991	Illayaraja	K. J. Yesudas, P. Suseela, K. S. Chithra
Sangathamizh Kaviye (Ragamalika: Abheri, Bageshri, Sumanesa Ranjani)	Manathil Uruthi Vendum	1987	Illayaraja	K. J. Yesudas, K. S. Chithra
Dhevadhai Poloru	Gopura Vasalile	1991	Illayaraja	Malaysia Vasudevan, Mano, Deepan Chakravarthy, S. N. Surendar
Ennai Thottu	Unna Nenachen Pattu Padichen	1992	Illayaraja	S. P. Balasubrahmanyam, Swarnalatha
Mayilaadum Thoppil	Chinna Pasanga Naanga	1992	Illayaraja	S. P. Balasubrahmanyam, S. Janaki
Orellam Un Pattuthan	Orellam Un Pattu	1991	Illayaraja	K. J. Yesudas, Swarnalatha(Pathos)
En Paattu En Paattu	Poomani	1996	Illayaraja	Illayaraja
Punnaivana Ponguiyile	Sevanthi	1994	Illayaraja	Arunmozhi, Swarnalatha
Adi Aasai Machaan	Kummi Paattu	1999	Illayaraja	Arunmozhi, Swarnalatha
Kanne Yen Kanmaniye	Kavithai Paadum Alaigal	1990	Illayaraja	Mano, K. S. Chithra
Unn Manasile Paattuthaan	Paandi Nattu Thangam	1989	Illayaraja	S. P. Balasubrahmanyam, K. S. Chithra
Poovendrum Ponne Endrum	Dhuruva Natchathiram		Illayaraja	S. P. Balasubrahmanyam, K. S. Chithra
Guruvayurappa	Pudhu Pudhu Arthangal	1989	Illayaraja	S. P. Balasubrahmanyam, K. S. Chithra
Deviye Naan Saranam	Thanga Thamaraigal	1991	Illayaraja	S. P. Balasubrahmanyam, K. S. Chithra
Muththamizhe Muththamizhe	Raman Abdullah	1997	Illayaraja	S. P. Balasubrahmanyam, K. S. Chithra
Kumbhabhisekham Koyiluku	Veera Thalattu	1998	Illayaraja	S. P. Balasubrahmanyam, K. S. Chithra
Medhuva Meduva	Annanagar Mudhal Theru	1988	Chandrabose	S. P. Balasubrahmanyam, K. S. Chithra
Saravana Poikayil	Poramai	1980	S.D.Sekar	K. J. Yesudas, B.S.Sasirekha
Thanimayile	Sattam Oru Iruttarai	1981	Shankar–Ganesh	S. N. Surendar, S. Janaki
Vennila Mugham Paduthu	Jyothi Malar	1986	Shankar–Ganesh	K. J. Yesudas, Vani Jairam
Poove Nee Yaar Solli	Thaniyatha Thagam		A. A. Raj	Malaysia Vasudevan, S. Janaki
Kannodu Kaanbadhellam	Jeans	1998	A. R. Rahman	Nithyashree Mahadevan
Taniye Taniye	Rangeela	1995	A. R. Rahman	S. Janaki
Mel Isaiyae	Mr. Romeo	1996	A. R. Rahman	Swarnalatha, Unni Menon, Srinivas, Sujatha
Muppadhu Nimidam	Parasuram	2003	A. R. Rahman	P. Unnikrishnan, Sujatha Mohan
Sahana	Sivaji: The Boss	2007	A. R. Rahman	Udit Narayan, Chinmayi, A. R. Rahman
Nagumo	Arunachalam	1997	Deva	Hariharan, K. S. Chithra
Sempattu Poove	Purusha Lakshanam	1993	Deva	S. P. Balasubrahmanyam, K. S. Chithra
Pathinettu Vayadhu	Suriyan	1992	Deva	S. P. Balasubrahmanyam, S. Janaki
Un Marbile Vizhi Moodi(Reused Tune)	Ninaithen Vandhai	1998	Deva	K. S. Chithra & chorus
Poothirukkum Vaname	Pudhayal	1997	Vidyasagar	Hariharan, Uma Ramanan
Malare Oru Varthai	Poomagal Oorvalam	1999	Siva	Hariharan, Sujatha Mohan
Sollamalae	Poove Unakkaga	1996	S. A. Rajkumar	P. Jayachandran, Sujatha, Sunandha
Oru Vaartha Kekka	Ayya	2005	Bharadwaj	Sadhana Sargam, KK
Aasai Oviyam	Manjal Veiyil	2009	Bharadwaj	Bharadwaj
Pudhu Kadhal	Pudhukottaiyilirundhu Saravanan	2004	Yuvan Shankar Raja	Ranjith, Chinmayi
Engeyo Paartha	Yaaradi Nee Mohini	2008	Yuvan Shankar Raja	Udit Narayan
Endhan Uyir Thozhiyae	Winner	2003	Yuvan Shankar Raja	Udit Narayan
Unakkul Naane	Pachaikili Muthucharam	2007	Harris Jayaraj	Bombay Jayashri
Kana Kaangiren	Ananda Thandavam	2009	G. V. Prakash Kumar	Nithyashree Mahadevan, Shubha Mudgal, Vinita, Uluwissu Santhoshan Suarez
Uyire Uyire	Ellame En Kadhali	1994	M. M. Keeravani	Mano, K. S. Chithra
Ya Ya Yadhava	Devaraagam	1996	M. M. Keeravani	S. P. Balasubrahmanyam, K. S. Chitra
Nee Korinal	180	2011	Sharreth	Karthik, Shweta Mohan
Konjam Thenkasi(Charanam in Nattai)	Thenkasi Pattanam	2002	Suresh Peters	K.S. Chitra, Srinivas, Sriram
Kannamma	Ispade Rajavum Idhaya Raniyum	2019	Sam C. S.	Anirudh Ravichander

=== Album ===
Song	Language	Album	Composer	Lyricist	Singer	Audio Label / Licence to
Veral Veli	Tamil	Sandham	Raleigh Rajan	Kapilar (Kuruntokai 18)	Bombay Jayashri	Raleigh Rajan
Suvakshoja Kumbham	Sanskrit	Sharada Bhujangam	Mahesh Mahadev	Adi Shankaracharya	Priyadarshini	PM Audios
Palisennanu Sri Mahalakshmi	Kannada	Palisennanu Sri Mahalakshmi	Mahesh Mahadev	Purandara Dasa	Priyadarshini	PM Audios
Manase Manase	Malayalam	Hridayam				
Ghana Sundara	Sanskrit	Jagannath Bhakti Rath Yatra	Sri. Siba Prasad Rath	Dr. Naresh Chandra Dass	Abhilipsa Panda	Times Music Spiritual

== See also ==
- List of film songs based on ragas

== Sources ==
- Bor, Joep; Rao, Suvarnalata (1999). The Raga Guide: A Survey of 74 Hindustani Ragas. Nimbus Records with Rotterdam Conservatory of Music. p. 40. ISBN 9780954397609.
- Bhimpalāsi Rāga (Hin), The Oxford Encyclopaedia of the Music of India. Oxford University Press. ISBN 9780195650983.
- Gosvami, O. (1957). The Story Of Indian Music. Bombay: Asia Publishing House.
