= Vanambadi =

- Theatrical release poster
- Directed by: G. R. Nathan
- Screenplay by: Valampuri Somanathan
- Based on: Sesh Porichoy by Aanand Singh Thahore
- Produced by: K. Murukesan; Kannadasan
- Starring: S. S. Rajendran; Devika
- Cinematography: G. R. Nathan
- Edited by: S. Surya
- Music by: K. V. Mahadevan
- Production company: Kannadasan Productions
- Release date: 9 March 1963
- Running time: 146 minutes
- Country: India
- Language: Tamil

Vanambadi (/vɑːnəmbɑːdi/ transl. Skylark) is a 1963 Indian Tamil-language thriller film, directed by G. R. Nathan, produced by K. Murukesan and Kannadasan, and written by Valampuri Somanathan. A remake of the 1957 Bengali film Sesh Porichoy, it stars S. S. Rajendran and Devika, with R. Muthuraman, S. V. Sahasranamam, T. R. Rajakumari, T. R. Ramachandran, R. S. Manohar, Pushpalatha, Sheela and Kamal Haasan. The film was released on 9 March 1963 and was a box-office success.

== Plot ==
Meena, a young woman, escapes from the clutches of a womanising Zamindar. She attempts suicide and is saved by an elderly couple, who adopt her. They wish her to wed their nephew Sekhar, and the wedding is arranged. But during the ceremony, another man shows up claiming Meena to be his wife. She is arrested for the attempted murder of the Zamindar. But she says she does not know him. Her adoptive brother Mohan and a friend Nithyanandham try to solve the mystery. Meena runs away from the family to relieve them of the anguish she has caused them and they later find her as a stage/playback singer calling herself Kausalya Devi. But Kausalya Devi claims she has never seen them before. How they resolve the mystery forms the rest of the story.

== Cast ==
- S. S. Rajendran as Sekhar
- Devika as Uma/Meena/Sumathi/Kausalya Devi
- R. Muthuraman as Mohan
- S. V. Sahasranamam as Thanikachalam
- T. R. Ramachandran as Nithyanandham
- R. S. Manohar as Gopal
- Javar Seetharaman as Dr. Shivasankaran
- Kamal Haasan as Ravi
- T. R. Rajakumari as Parvathi
- Pushpalatha as Kalyani
- Sheela as Chithra
- V. S. Raghavan as Somasundaram
- O. A. K. Thevar as Zamindar Marthandam
- M. E. Madhavan as Sundaramoorthy
- Janaki
- Radhabhai
- Jyothi Lakshmi as a dancer

== Production ==
Vanambadi is a remake of the Bengali film Sesh Porichoy. It was produced by K. Murukesan and Kannadasan, directed and photographed by G. R. Nathan, written by Valampuri Somanathan, and edited by S. Surya. It was the last film for T. R. Rajakumari as an actress.

== Soundtrack ==
The soundtrack was composed by K. V. Mahadevan and the lyrics for all songs were written by Kannadasan. The song "Gangaikarai" is set in Abheri raga, and "Thookanna Kuruvi" is set in "Suddha Dhanyasi with Charukesi". For the song "Kadavul Manithanaga", Kannadasan initially wrote the lyrics "Avan Kadhalithe Vedhanaiyil Saaga Vendum" to which singer T. M. Soundararajan objected as he was religious and would not sing lines which degrade god and suggested changing the lyrics. Kannadasan finally changed the lyrics to "Vaada Vendum".

Songs	Singer	Length
"Gangai Karai Thottam"	P. Susheela	5:46
"Oomai Penn Oru"	P. Susheela	4:03
"Thookanna Kuruvi Kodu"	P. Susheela	4:21
"Aan Kaviyai Vella"	T. M. Soundararajan P. Susheela	5:30
"Kadavul Manithanaga"	T. M. Soundararajan	3:20
"Yettil Ezhuthi Vaithan"	T. M. Soundararajan L. R. Eswari (Humming)	3:24
"Yaaradi Vanthaar"	L. R. Eswari	3:49
"Nil Kavani Purappadu"	A. L. Raghavan L. R. Eswari	4:10

== Release and reception ==
Vanambadi was released on 9 March 1963. Kanthan of Kalki positively reviewed the film, saying the titular skylark was singing well. The film was commercially successful, and Devika was particularly appreciated for playing the double role.

== Bibliography ==
- Kannadasan (2008). எனது சுயசரிதம் [My Autobiography] (in Tamil). Kannadhasan Pathippagam. ISBN 9788184020205.
