= Dhani (raga) =

Pentatonic raga in Hindustani classical music

- Thaat: Kafi
- Type: Audava
- Time of day: Any
- Arohana: (Ṇ)S G M P N Ṡ
- Avarohana: Ṡ N P M G (R)S
- Synonym: Gaundgiri
- Equivalent: Shuddha Dhanyasi (Carnatic); Minor pentatonic scale (Western)
- Similar: Bhimpalasi; Malkauns; Dhanashree

Dhani is a pentatonic raga in Hindustani classical music. It is a sprightly raga often described as Bhimpalasi sans the notes, Dha and Re. It however has its own distinct character. Dhani is frequently heard in popular music. This raga is also known as the romantic version of Raag Malkauns. It is similar to Malkauns, except that in the Aaroh and Avroh, Komal Dha is replaced by Pa in this raga. The equivalent of this raga in Carnatic Music is the raga Shuddha Dhanyasi.

== Popular Compositions (Bandishes) ==
Hey Manwa Tum Na Jane by Pt C R Vyas is a popular Bandish in this raag.

== Indian Film songs in Dhani (raga) ==
=== Language: Hindi ===
Song	Movie	Year	Composer	Singer
Prabhu Tero Nam Jo Dhyae Phal Paye	Hum Dono (1961 film)	1961	Jaidev	Lata Mangeshkar
Kabhi Tanhaiyon me Yun	Hamari Yaad Aayegi	1961	Snehal Bhatkar	Mubarak Begum
Badan Pe Sitare Lapete Hue (Loosely Based)	Prince	1969	Shankar-Jaikishan	Mohd. Rafi
Gori Tera Gaon Bada Pyara	Chitchor	1976	Ravindra Jain	K J Yesudas
Aa Re Pritam Pyare (Tune used from the Hook of "Vaadi Vaadi Naattu Katta")	Rowdy Rathore	2012	Sajid-Wajid	Mamta Sharma

== Indian Film songs (Tamil, Telugu, Malayalam, Kannada) ==
Note that the following songs are composed in Suddha Dhanyasi, the equivalent of raga Dhani in Carnatic music.

=== Language: Tamil ===
Song	Movie	Year	Composer	Singer
Anandamaana Naadham	Shyamala	1952	G. Ramanathan	M. K. Thyagaraja Bhagavathar
Vaa Vaa Valarmathiye	Vanangamudi	1957	G. Ramanathan	M. L. Vasanthakumari
Aairathil Oruthiyamma	Kai Koduttha Dheivam	1964	K. V. Mahadevan	T. M. Soundararajan
Mella Mella	Sarada	1962	K. V. Mahadevan	T. M. Soundararajan
Thookanna Kuruvi Kodu	Vanambadi	1963	K. V. Mahadevan	P. Susheela
Navaraathiri Subha Raathiri	Navarathri	1964	K. V. Mahadevan	P. Susheela
Ival Oru Pournami	Ival Oru Pournami	1986	T. K. Ramamoorthy	P. Susheela
Kangal Engey	Karnan	1964	Viswanathan–Ramamoorthy	P. Susheela
Neeye Unaku Endrum (Mama Maple)	Bale Pandiya	1962	Viswanathan–Ramamoorthy	T. M. Soundararajan, M. Raju
Thottal Poo Malarum	Padagotti	1964	Viswanathan–Ramamoorthy	T. M. Soundararajan, P. Susheela
Paal Vannam Paruvam	Paasam	1962	Viswanathan–Ramamoorthy	P. B. Sreenivas, P. Susheela
Nallavan Enaku Naane	Padithal Mattum Podhuma	1962	Viswanathan–Ramamoorthy	T. M. Soundararajan, P. B. Sreenivas
Unnidathil Ennai Koduthen	Avalukendru Or Manam	1971	M. S. Viswanathan	S. Janaki
Iyarkai Ennum	Shanti Nilayam	1969	M. S. Viswanathan	S. P. Balasubrahmanyam, P. Susheela
Nama Ooru Singari	Ninaithale Inikkum (1979 film)	1979	M. S. Viswanathan	S. P. Balasubrahmanyam
Thirupparang Kundrathil	Kandhan Karunai	1967	Kunnakudi Vaidyanathan	Soolamangalam Rajalakshmi, P. Susheela
Vaa Ponmayile	Poonthalir	1979	Illayaraja	S. P. Balasubrahmanyam
Mancholai Kilithano (2nd Charanam Starts in Ragam Kharaharapriya)	Kizhakke Pogum Rail	1978	Illayaraja	P. Jayachandran
Poovarasampoo	Kizhakke Pogum Rail	1978	Illayaraja	S. Janaki
Nadhiyoram	Annai Oru Aalayam	1979	Illayaraja	S. P. Balasubrahmanyam, P. Susheela
Aayiram Malargalae	Niram Maaratha Pookkal	1979	Illayaraja	Malaysia Vasudevan, S. P. Sailaja, Jency Anthony
Siru Ponmani	Kallukkul Eeram	1980	Illayaraja	Ilaiyaraaja, S. Janaki
Vizhiyil Vizhundu	Alaigal Oivathillai	1981	Illayaraja	Ilaiyaraaja, B.S Sasirekha
Ragavane Ramana	Ilamai Kaalangal	1983	Illayaraja	P Susheela, S. P. Sailaja
Kalakalakum Maniosai	Eeramana Rojave	1991	Illayaraja	Mano, S. Janaki
Varaathu Vantha	Thalattu Padava	1990	Illayaraja	Arunmozhi, S. Janaki
Ila Nenje Vaa	Vanna Vanna Pookkal	1992	Illayaraja	K. J. Yesudas
Maalayil Yaro Manathodu	Chatriyan	1990	Illayaraja	Swarnalatha
Punjai Undu	Unnal Mudiyum Thambi	1988	Illayaraja	S. P. Balasubrahmanyam
Pudhiya Poovithu Poothathu	Thendrale Ennai Thodu	1985	Illayaraja	S. P. Balasubrahmaniam & S Janaki
Kadhal Vaanile	Raasaiyya	1995	Illayaraja	S. P. Balasubrahmanyam, Preethi Uttamsingh
Sempoove Poove (Has Abheri traces also)	Siraichalai	1996	Illayaraja	S. P. Balasubrahmanyam, K. S. Chithra
Paramal Paartha Nenjam	Poonthotta Kaavalkaaran	1988	Illayaraja	Mano, K. S. Chithra
Kalathanamaha	Ulle Veliye	1993	Illayaraja	Mano, K. S. Chithra
Kathal Nilavey Poove	Manikuyil	1993	Illayaraja	Arunmozhi, Uma Ramanan
Maasi Maasam	Dharma Durai	1991	Illayaraja	K J Yesudas, Swarnalatha
Kalayil Kethattu	Senthamizh Paattu	1992	Illayaraja	S. P. Balasubrahmanyam, Swarnalatha
Aasai Machaan Vangithantha	Kummi Paattu	1999	Illayaraja	Swarnalatha, Arunmozhi
Enna Solli Paduvatho	En Mana Vaanil	2002	Illayaraja	Hariharan, Sadhana Sargam
Kaattumalli	Viduthalai Part 1	2023	Illayaraja	Ilaiyaraaja,Ananya Bhat
Poththi Vachcha	Mann Vasanai	1983	Illayaraja	S. P. Balasubrahmanyam, S. Janaki
Hey Unnai Thaane Nee Endha	Kadhal Parisu	1987	Illayaraja	S. P. Balasubrahmanyam, S. Janaki
Koo Koo Endru Kuyil	Kadhal Parisu	1987	Illayaraja	S. P. Balasubrahmanyam, S. Janaki
Poo Poo Poo	Pudhu Nellu Pudhu Naathu	1991	Illayaraja	S. P. Balasubrahmanyam, S. Janaki
Adi Netriravu	Innisai Mazhai	1992	Illayaraja	S. P. Balasubrahmanyam, S. Janaki
Pongiyathe Kadhal Vellam	Mannukkul Vairam	1986	Devendran	S. P. Balasubrahmanyam, S. Janaki
Mandhiram Sonnen	Vedham Pudhithu	1987	Devendran	Mano, S. Janaki
Aruvi Kooda Jathi Illamal	Gowri Manohari		M. M. A. Iniyavan	S. P. Balasubrahmanyam, K. J. Yesudas
Thanthana Thaimasam	Thavasi	2001	Vidyasagar	K. J. Yesudas, Sadhana Sargam
Vaadi Vaadi Naattu Katta	Alli Thandha Vaanam	2001	Vidyasagar	Shankar Mahadevan, Sujatha Mohan
Kanakandenadi	Parthiban Kanavu	2003	Vidyasagar	Madhu Balakrishnan
Aazhakkadalu	Thendral	2004	Vidyasagar	Madhu Balakrishnan
Thirumana Malargal	Poovellam Un Vasam	2001	Vidyasagar	Swarnalatha
Minsaram En Meethu	Run	2002	Vidyasagar	Harish Raghavendra, Sadhana Sargam, Jack Smelly
Thootal Poo Malarum	New	2004	A. R. Rahman	Hariharan, Harini
Kalayil Thinamum (Has Abheri traces also)	New	2004	A. R. Rahman	P. Unnikrishnan, Sadhana Sargam
Eechi Elemichhi	Taj Mahal	1999	A. R. Rahman	Manoj, Arundhathi, Raqeeb Alam (Iranian Santoor), Parthasarathy (Veena), Navin (Flute)
Ale Ale	Boys	2003	A. R. Rahman	Karthik, Chitra Sivaraman
Maaza Maaza	Sillunu Oru Kaadhal	2006	A. R. Rahman	S. P. B. Charan, Shreya Ghoshal
Naan Varuvene	Raavanan	2010	A. R. Rahman	A R Rahman, Jali Fily Cissokho
Aila Aila	I	2015	A. R. Rahman	Aditya Rao, Natalie Di Luccio
Bhavamu Lona BGM (taken from MS Subbulakshmi's Annamayya Krithi)	OK Kanmani	2015	A. R. Rahman	AR Rahman, Qutub-E-Kripa, MS Subbulakshmi
Maatharey	Bigil	2019	A. R. Rahman	Chinmayi, Madhura Dhara Talluri, Sireesha, Akshara, Vithusayni
Azhaga Kallazhaga	Kallazhagar	1999	Deva	K. S. Chitra, Kalpana Raghavendar
Ooh Vandhadhu	Aval Varuvala	1998	S. A. Rajkumar	Hariharan
Ponman Kuyil	Manasukkul Mathappu	1988	S. A. Rajkumar	S. P. Balasubrahmanyam
Thodu Thodu Enavae Vanavil (Reused from Kila Kila Navve)	Thullatha Manamum Thullum	1999	S. A. Rajkumar	Hariharan, K. S. Chitra
Thiyagarajarin Deiva (copy of Entha Nerchina)	Pennin Manathai Thottu	2000	S. A. Rajkumar	P. Unnikrishnan, Nithyasree Mahadevan, S. A. Rajkumar, Febi Mani
Azhagiya Karthigai	Devaraagam	1996	M. M. Keeravani	K. S. Chitra
Un Perai Sonnale	Dumm Dumm Dumm	2001	Karthik Raja	P. Unnikrishnan, Sadhana Sargam
Yaar Indha Devathai	Unnai Ninaithu	2002	Sirpy	Hariharan
Kannukkul Yetho	Thiruvilaiyaadal Aarambam	2006	D. Imman	Vijay Yesudas, Rita
Aasai Oviyam	Manjal Veiyil	2009	Bharadwaj	Bharadwaj, Subiksha
Heartile Battery	Nanban	2012	Harris Jayaraj	Vedala Hemachandra, Mukesh Mohamed
Roja Kadale	Anegan	2015	Harris Jayaraj	Shankar Mahadevan, Sunidhi Chauhan, Chinmayi
Para Para Pattaampoochi	Kattradhu Thamizh	2007	Yuvan Shankar Raja	Rahul Nambiar
Vaanam Thoovum Poo Mazhaiye	Punnagai Poove	2003	Yuvan Shankar Raja	Harish Raghavendra, Kovai Ranjani
Kaatrukulle	Sarvam	2009	Yuvan Shankar Raja	Yuvan Shankar Raja
Sudasuda Thooral	Kedi Billa Killadi Ranga	2013	Yuvan Shankar Raja	Yuvan Shankar Raja
Masaamaa 6 Masaamaa	Engaeyum Eppothum	2011	Sathya	Sathya, Aalap Raju
Veyyon Silli	Soorarai Pottru	2020	G. V. Prakash Kumar	Harish Sivaramakrishnan

=== Non Film / Album ===
Song	Language	Album	Composer	Lyricist	Singer	Audio Label / Licence to
Neene Parama Pavani	Kannada	Neene Parama Pavani	Mahesh Mahadev	Mahipathi Dasa	Priyadarshini	PM Audios
Baarisu Kannada Dindimava	Kannada	Baarisu Kannada Dindimava	Shivamogga Subbanna	Mahakavi Kuvempu	Upendra Kumar	MRT Music
Thunbam Illadha Nilaye Shakti (has Jog traces also)	Tamil	Triveni - Durga, Lakshmi, Saraswati	Sounds of Isha	Mahakavi Bharatiyar	Sounds of Isha	
The Flute Song	N/A	O, Meri Munni	Remo Fernandes	N/A	Remo Fernandes (flute performance)	Sony Music

=== Language: Malayalam ===
Song	Movie	Year	Composer	Singer
Souparnikamrutha Veechikal	Kizhakkunarum Pakshi	1991	Raveendran	KJ Yesudas / Minmini
Swara Raga Ganga Pravahame (has Abheri traces also)	Sargam	1992	Bombay Ravi	KJ Yesudas
Mahalakshmi Namosthuthe	Thattathin Marayathu	2012	Shaan Rahman	Arun Alat
Devadoothar padi	Kathodu Kathoram	1985	Ouseppachan	KJ Yesudas and many more
Melle melle	Oru Minnaminunginte Nurunguvettam	1987	Johnson	KJ Yesudas
Dum dum dum	Vaisali	1988	Bombay Ravi	Dinesh, Lathika
Shyamameghame ne	Adhipan	1989	Shyam	K. S. Chitra
Mandharachepundo	Dasharatham	1989	Johnson	MG Sreekumar, K. S. Chitra
Entinu veroru sooryodhayam	Mazhayethum Munpe	1995	Raveendran	KJ Yesudas
Chempoove poove (has Abheri traces also)	Kaalapani	1996	Ilayaraja	MG Sreekumar, K. S. Chitra
Manikinavin kothumbuvallam	Pokkiri Raja	2010	Jassie Gift	KJ Yesudas, Sujatha Mohan

=== Language: Kannada ===
Song	Movie	Year	Composer	Singer
Baare Baare Andada Chaluvina Taare	Naagarahaavu	1972	Vijaya Bhaskar	P.B. Srinivas
Nanna neenu gellalare	Nee Nanna Gellalare	1981	Ilaiyaraaja	Dr RajKumar, S. Janaki
Chendulli Chendulli	Bhagyada Balegara	2009	Ilaiyaraaja	Ilaiyaraaja, Shreya Ghoshal
Nanna Aase Hannagi	Auto Raja	1982	Rajan–Nagendra	S.P. Balasubramanyam, S. Janaki

=== Language: Telugu ===
Song	Movie	Year	Composer	Singer
Sadi Seyako Gaali	Raja Makutam	1960	Master Venu	P Leela
Alalu Kalalu	Seethakoka Chilaka	1981	Ilaiyaraaja	Ilaiyaraaja & Vani Jairam
Banthee Chamanthi	Abhilasha	1983	Ilaiyaraaja	S P Balasubramaniam & S. Janaki
Induvadana Kundaradana	Challenge	1984	Ilaiyaraaja	S P Balasubramaniam & S. Janaki
Vayyari Godaramma	Preminchu Pelladu	1985	Ilaiyaraaja	S P Balasubramaniam & S. Janaki
Manasu Palike	Swathi Muthyam	1985	Ilaiyaraaja	S P Balasubramaniam & S. Janaki
Manasuna Molichina	Sankeertana	1987	Ilaiyaraaja	S P Balasubramaniam & S. Janaki
Manchu Kurise Velalo	Abhinandana	1988	Ilaiyaraaja	S P Balasubramaniam & S. Janaki
Vasantamaade Jeevitham	Bujjipaapa Bramhachaarulu	1990	Ilaiyaraaja	S P Balasubramaniam & S. Janaki
Allibilli Kalala	Chettu Kinda Pleader	1989	Ilaiyaraaja	S P Balasubramaniam & K S Chitra
Subha Lekha raasukunna	Kondaveeti Donga	1990	Ilaiyaraaja	S P Balasubramaniam & K S Chitra
Kotta Kottaga Unnadi	Coolie No.1	1991	Ilaiyaraaja	S P Balasubramaniam & K S Chitra
Enno RathrulosthayiGaani	Dharma Kshetram	1992	Ilaiyaraaja	S P Balasubramaniam & K S Chitra
Kinnerasaani Vachindamma	Sitara (1984 film)	1984	Ilaiyaraaja	S P Balasubramaniam & S P Sailaja
Tella Cheeraku	Aakhari Poratam	1988	Ilaiyaraaja	S P Balasubramaniam & Lata Mangeshkar
Ghallu Ghallu Ghallumantu	Swarnakamalam	1988	Ilaiyaraaja	S P Balasubramaniam & P Susheela
Enni Janmalaina	శ్రీ ఏడుకొండలస్వామి	1991	Ilaiyaraaja	Ilaiyaraaja & S Janaki
Priya Priyatama Raagaalu	Killer (1992 film)	1992	Ilaiyaraaja	Mano & K S Chithra
Jagadananda Karaka (Film version)	Sri Rama Rajyam	2011	Ilaiyaraaja	S P Balasubramaniam & Shreya Ghoshal
Swara Raga Ganga Pravahame	Sarigamalu	1993	Bombay Ravi	KJ Yesudas
Vinaro Bhagyamu Vishnu Katha (taken from traditional Annamayya Keerthanalu, but only first line)	Annamayya	1997	M M Keeravani	S P Balasubramaniam
Kila Kila Navve	Suryavamsham	1998	S. A. Rajkumar	S P Balasubramaniam & K S Chitra
Pranavalaya	Shyam Singha Roy	2021	Mickey J Meyer	Anurag Kulkarni
