= Dhani Bandhawali =

Dhani Bandhawali is a small village in Mahendragarh district, Haryana, India, situated near Nangal Choudhary Town, India (First Cyber Village of Haryana). The village originated from Nangal Kaliya village, which is situated 2 km from it. "Dhani" is a Rajasthani word which means a small village. The name "Bandhawali" originated from the name of an old well Bandhala situated in the center of the village. The name therefore signifies "The small village with Bandhala Well". It is represented by Nangal Choudhary assembly seat of Haryana Government and District Mohindergarh since the last Assembly election in 2009. Earlier it was a part of the Ateli assembly seat. Ahirs (Yadavs) are the residents of the village. It has around 60-70 houses and a population of 250-300 people.

It has a primary school (L.K.G. to 5th Class) for village children. There is a small pond near the village used to collect rain-water. Its water is used as drinking water for village cattle.

The village is connected to the Narnaul-Jaipur state highway by a 400-meter concrete road. The road was built by the Late Sh. Rao Bansi Singh Ji, former M.L.A., Ateli.

The neighbouring villages are Mohanpur village to the south, Dhani Bayawali to the east, Sirohi Bhali and Nangal Kaliya to the north and Dhani Kumbhawali to the west.

Earlier, it was under the Panchayat of Nangal Kaliya village. From the year 2016, it has become a part of Nangal Choudhary.

The main occupation of the residents is agriculture, but young people are attracted towards public-private sector jobs. Many people are serving in the armed forces, naval forces and police forces, such as Indian Army, Indian Navy, Central Reserve Police Force, Border Security Force, Haryana Police and Delhi Police.

== Festivals ==
Hindu festivals such as Deepawali, Dussera (Vijayadashami), Holi, Dhulandi, Nav-Samvat, Navratri, Janamashtmi, Guga-Navmi, Maha-Shivratri, Sankranti and Raksha-Bandhan are celebrated within the village. Women celebrate the Karwa-Chauth, Teej, Til-Kutni, Nirjala Ekadshi and Hoee-Maata festivals. Some people also go for a Kanwad yatra during "Shraawan", "Shyaam Baba" yatra etc.

== Food ==
People prefer very basic Haryanavi food as their primary diet. The food contains grains as the primary content. The choice varies as per the season. In Winter, "Bajra (Pearl Millet)" is the primary grain and in Summer, "Genhu (Wheat)" is the primary intake.
