= Dhanni =

Dhanni may refer to:

- Dhanni/Dhani dialect, a dialect of Punjabi spoken in Pakistan
- Dhanni (cattle), a breed of cattle from Punjab, Pakistan

== See also ==
- Dhani (disambiguation)
