= Dhani Kumharan =

Village in Jhunjhunu district, Rajasthan, India

Coordinates: 28°36′N 75°04′E

Dhani Kumharan (Thali) is a small village in the Buhana tehsil of Jhunjhunu district of Rajasthan, India. The village is connected by gravel road. Nearby towns include Singhana, Buhana, Thali, Pacheri Bari, Khetri, and Chirawa. Singahania University provides education to the people of the villages nearby and giving them the opportunity to lift themselves, educate their children and liberate them from the social taboos.
