= Navora Ki Dhani =

Navora Ki Dhani is a village located in the Jhunjhunu district of the Indian state of Rajasthan (pin code 333302)
