= Dhana Taprogge =

Dhana
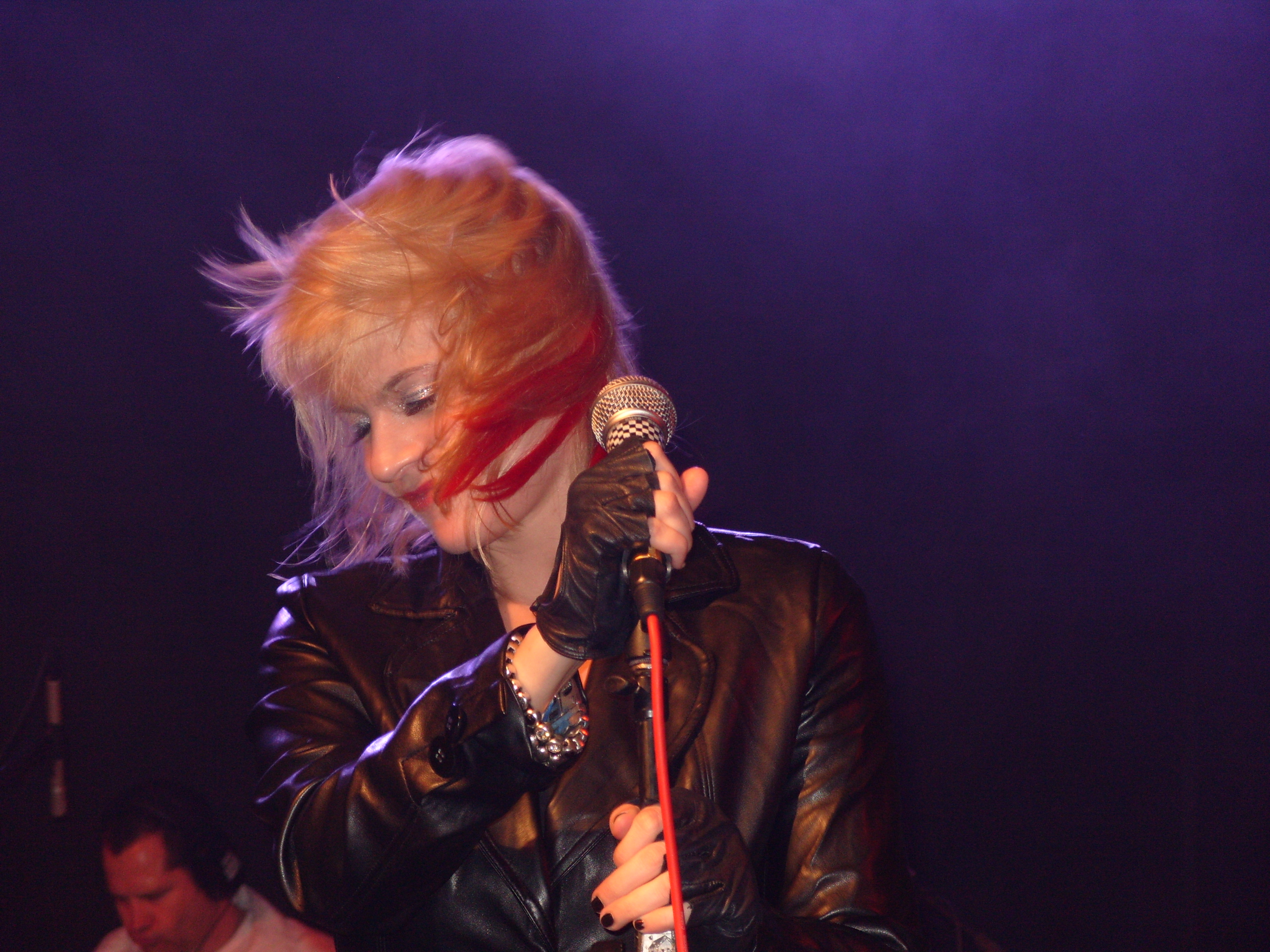

Background information
- Born: Dhana Taprogge; Germany
- Genres: Pop, electronic, dance
- Occupation: Singer-songwriter
- Instrument: Vocals
- Years active: 2006–present
- Label: Fly Me to the Moon Music
- Member of: Taxi Doll
- Website: dhanamusic.com

Dhana Taprogge is a European singer-songwriter known for her work with the electronic pop band Taxi Doll. She released her first solo EP, Confessions of Lily Rogue, on November 11, 2010.

== Musical career ==
Dhana Taprogge, European-born front-woman of Taxi Doll, is an accomplished songwriter whose music has been used in many films such as Firewall and John Tucker Must Die, and various television projects including The Hills, 90210, The Good Wife, and CSI: NY, and commercials worldwide.

After reaching success with Taxi Doll, Dhana decided to explore her creativity as a solo artist. In November 2010, she released an EP titled "Confessions of Lily Rogue," featuring electropop arrangements and more reflective undertones.

== Discography ==
- Confessions of Lily Rogue EP (2010)
