= Bhagan Bigha =

- village
- Location in Bihar, India Bhagan Bigha (India)
- Coordinates: 25.282304°N 85.519699°E
- Country: India
- State: Bihar
- District: Nalanda

Population
  - Total: 2,200

Languages
  - Official: Magahi, Hindi
- Time zone: UTC+5:30 (IST)
- PIN: 803118
- ISO 3166 code: IN-BR
- Vehicle registration: BR-21
- Coastline: 0 kilometres (0 mi)
- Nearest city: Bihar Sharif
- Literacy: 70%
- Lok Sabha constituency: Nalanda
- Climate: Moderate (Köppen)
- Avg. summer temperature: 44 °C (111 °F)
- Avg. winter temperature: 06 °C (43 °F)

Bhagan Bigha is a village near Bihar Sharif, in the Nalanda district of Bihar state, India. The village is situated on the National Highway 20 and state highway 78.
