= Gourimanohari =

23rd raga in the Melakarta

- Arohanam: S R₂ G₂ M₁ P D₂ N₃ Ṡ
- Avarohanam: Ṡ N₃ D₂ P M₁ G₂ R₂ S
- Equivalent: Melodic minor scale

Gourimanohari or Gaurimanohari is a ragam in Carnatic music (musical scale of South Indian classical music). It is the 23rd Melakarta rāgam in the 72 melakarta rāgam system of Carnatic music. The 23rd melakarta rāgam as per Muthuswami Dikshitar school of music is Gourivelāvaḻi.

The Western equivalent is the melodic minor scale.

The Hindustani music equivalent to this rāgam is Raag Patdeep.

== Structure and Lakshana ==
Gourimanohari scale with Shadjam at C

It is the 5th rāgam in the 4th chakra Veda. The mnemonic name is Veda-Ma. The mnemonic phrase is sa ri gi ma pa dhi nu. Its ārohaṇa-avarohaṇa structure (ascending and descending scale) is as follows (see swaras in Carnatic music for details on below notation and terms):

- ārohaṇa: S R₂ G₂ M₁ P D₂ N₃ Ṡ (Note: Alternate notations: Hindustani: S R G̱ M P D N Ṡ; Western: C D E♭ F G A B C)
- avarohaṇa: Ṡ N₃ D₂ P M₁ G₂ R₂ S (Note: Alternate notations: Hindustani: Ṡ N D P M G̱ R S; Western: C B A G F E♭ D C)

The notes used in this scale are shadjam, chatushruti rishabham, sadharana gandharam, shuddha madhyamam, panchamam, chatushruti daivatam and kakali nishadham. It is a sampurna rāgam – a rāgam that has all seven swaras (notes). It is the shuddha madhyamam equivalent of Dharmavati, which is the 59th melakarta.

== Janya rāgams ==
It has a few minor janya rāgams (derived scales) associated with it. See List of janya rāgams to look up all rāgams associated with it.
