= Garodia Ki Dhani =

Garodia Ki Dhani (Nawalgarh) is a village in the Jhunjhunu district of Rajasthan, India. It is approximately 9 kilometres (5.6 mi) from the Nawalgarh tehsil. It is a part of Shekhawati. Garodia ki Dhani is Located in East of Nawalgarh nearby Pujari ki Dhani. It is 30 km from Sikar district Headquarter and 40 km from Jhunjhunu district Headquarter. Shri Ishrot Ka Balaji is a temple in Garodia Ki Dhani.

The population of the village is 950–1000. There are 200 families residing in the village. 150 families are Jats. The biggest gotra of (Garodia) Jats in the village.

The village has a school and two clinics. The chief occupation is agriculture.

The famous man is shri ranjeet Singh garodiya in garodiya ki dhani
