= Katkai =

Coordinates: 33°19′N 75°36′E

Katkai is a village located in Ateli tehsil, Mahendragarh district, Haryana, India. It is on the Ateli–Mahendergarh road and is 6 kilometres from Ateli and 20 kilometres from Mahendergarh. Katkai, a village of wrestlers and sports persons. The village has a Govt school up to Middle Class with a certain playground for villagers. Medical facilities are available in Ateli city. Presently Sarpanch is Ramnivas Yadav. The population of the village is more than 1800 in which 52% males and 48% females, about 58% are the youngers below age 35, 28% are adults age between 35 and 60, and 14% are senior above age 60. Most people are involved in agricultural activities to earn.
