= Neem Ki Dhani =

Nimakidhani Neem Ki Dhani Neemakidhani
- Village
- Nima kidhani location in Rajasthan Nimakidhani (India)
- Coordinates: 27.93546°N 75.5422°E
- Country: India
- State: Rajasthan
- Division: Jaipur
- District: Sikar
- Tehsil: Ramgarh Shekhawati Rajasthan
- Founded: c. 1482–1483
- Founder: Nyoldanji Kavia
- Elevation: 320 m (1,050 ft)

Languages
  - Official: Hindi
- Time zone: UTC+5:30 (IST)
- PIN: 331024
- ISO 3166 code: RJ-IN
- Climate: Hot semi-arid (Köppen)
- Avg. summer temperature: 48–49 °C
- Avg. winter temperature: 0–1 °C
- Avg. annual precipitation: 460 mm

Nimakidhani (also known as Neem Ki Dhani or Neemakidhani) is a village located in RamgarhShekhawati tehsil, Sikar district, within the Jaipur division, in the Indian state of Rajasthan. Lying on the border of three districts, Sikar, Jhunjhunu, and Churu, it is part of the historical region of Shekhawati and has a sub-tropical semi-arid climate.Smt Santara Devi is sarpanch of this village. The nearest railway station Ramgarh Shekhawati is well connected by trains with Jaipur and Churu.

== History ==
The village was founded by Nyoldanji Kavia in the year 1539 of the Vikram Samwat calendar (c. 1482–1483). The land was given in jagir as sasan by Devi Singh of Sikar. The Karanimata mandir of this village is very important, statue was placed by Baldanji Kavia and regular puja (worshiping) is being performed by local people
