= Dhanashree =

Hindustani raga

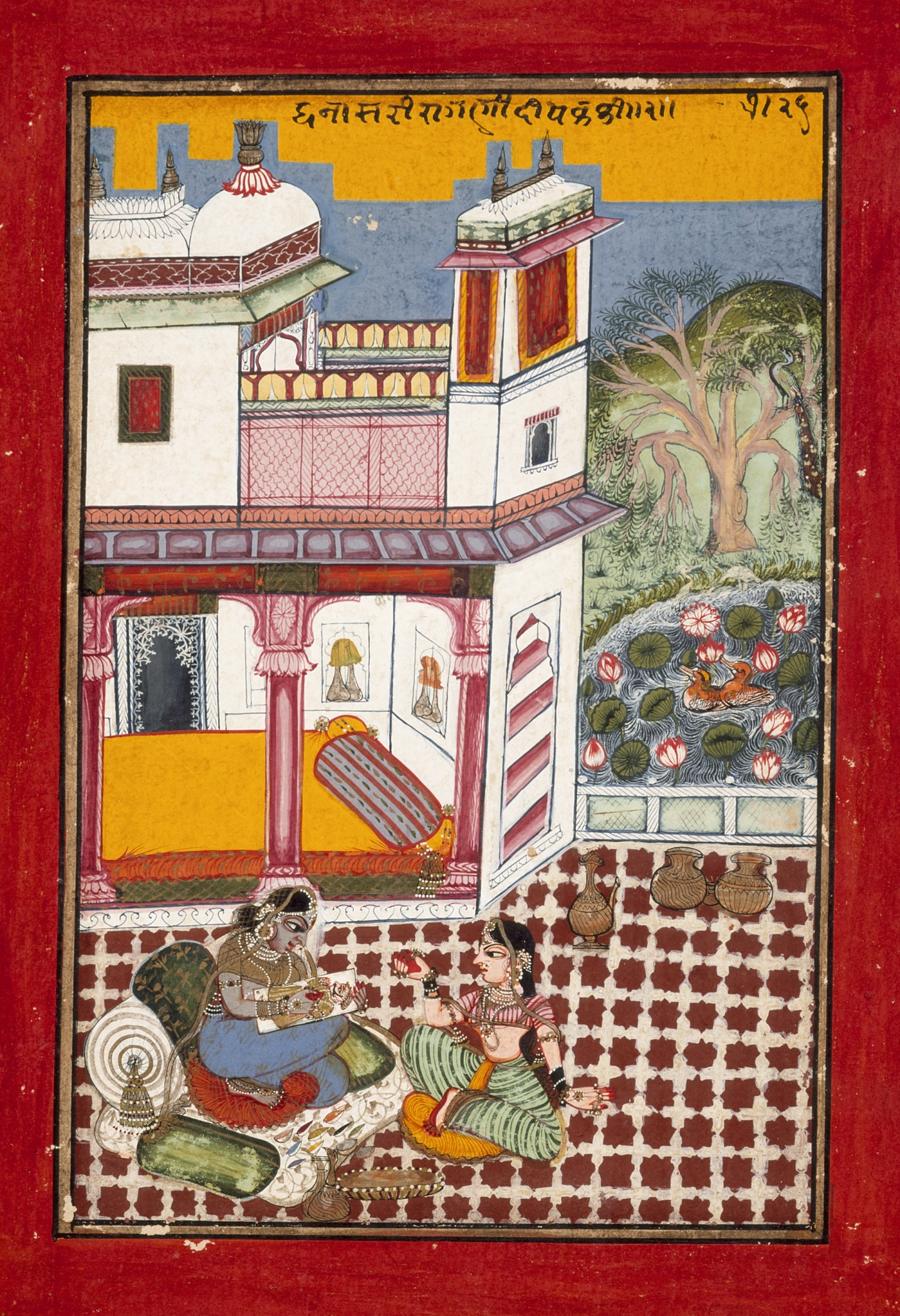
- Thaat: Kafi
- Similar: Bhimpalasi; Dhani

Dhanasree is a raga. It prominently appears in the Sikh tradition from northern India and is part of the Guru Granth Sahib.

Raga Dhanashree appears in the Ragmala as a ragini of Malkauns and currently is a member of the Kafi thaat. It closely resembles Bhimpalasi in musical content but the vadis and moods are different (Described Below). Dhanashree is performed in the early afternoon and presents a cheerful, happy mood. It provided the setting for hymns by Guru Nanak, Guru Amar Das, Guru Ram Das, Guru Arjan and Guru Tegh Bahadar for a total of 101 hymns.

The following represents the order of notes that can be used on the ascending and descending phase of the composition and the primary and secondary notes:

- Aroh: ni Sa ga Ma Pa ni Sa
- Avroh: Sa ni Dha Pa Ma Pa ga Re Sa
- Vadi: Sa
- Samvadi: Pa
- Jaati : Audava – sampurana
- samay : Third pehar of the day
- Thaat : Kafi

This Raag is almost exactly the same as the Classical Raga Bhimpalasi, only that the Vadi/Samvadi are switched. So in Bhimpalasi, the Vadi is Ma and Samvadi is Sa.

Pa is given considerable emphasis and Ni and Pa receive sliding approaches, a characteristic of this raga. The pentatonic ascent provides some of the melodic features of this raga.

The Carnatic Equivalent of this raga is Abheri

== See also ==
- Kirtan
