= Pujari Ki Dhani =

Village in Rajasthan

Pujari Ki Dhani is a village in the Jhunjhunu district of Rajasthan, India. It is approximately 9 kilometres (5.6 mi) from the Nawalgarh tehsil. It is part of Shekhawati. It is a Grampanchayat. Pujari Ki Dhani is Located in East of Nawalgarh nearby Gothara.

The village have one secondary government school and two private schools. the village also has one govt hospital near bala ji temple.
