= Taxi Doll =

US musical group

Taxi Doll is an American pop, electronica, and dance musical group from Los Angeles, California. Taxi Doll took their name from seeing the bobble-head dolls perched on top on the rear dash of taxicabs. The group consists of European vocalist Dhana Taprogge, keyboardist Gregg "G-dub" Allen, drummer Jason Graham, guitarist Matt Emmer, and bassist Brian Hendrix.

The group was formed in 2004 and called their type of music "Rocktronica", which was inspired by the influences of Blondie, Garbage, The Chemical Brothers, and other rock-electronic acts. The group's first single, "Waiting", became a major hit in both the clubs and at Dance radio in the United States, where it reached at number 3 on Billboard's Hot Dance Airplay chart's May 27, 2006 issue. "Look at What You Get" is on the soundtrack of Forza Motorsport 2, the Microsoft Xbox 360 game. The group's music was also found on the big screen in the 2006 feature film Firewall.

Taxi Doll were signed by Universal Records. Their first LP album, Here and Now, released globally on February 23, 2009.
