= Jhakar Bigha =

- Village
- Location within Bihar Location within India
- Coordinates: 24.508241°N 84.952329°E
- Country: India
- State: Bihar
- District: Rohtas

Languages
  - Spoken: Hindi, Urdu, Maithili, Magahi
- Time zone: UTC+5:30 (IST)
- ISO 3166 code: IN-BR

Jhakar Bigha is a small village in Rohtas district, in the Indian state of Bihar. The village is 124 kilometres (77 mi) south of Patna, the capital and largest city of the state of Bihar, 896 kilometres (557 mi) southeast of New Delhi, the capital of India, and 1,396 kilometres (867 mi) northeast of Mumbai.

== People ==
Populations of Jhakar Bigha is about 800 The main occupation of the people agriculture and dairy farming.

Sita Ram Singh

Ram Adhar Singh and Bal Bacchan Singh

Hridya Nand Singh, Surendra Prasad Singh and Krishna Kant

== Schools ==
Primary School: Jhakar Bigha

Middle School: Dhanahara

High School: Surya Nath High School, Osaon

== Geography and climate ==
The village of Jhakar Bigha is located in the southwestern part of Bihar, North India, in a flat plain running alongside the Kaimur Range and Rohtas Plateau. The majority of the land is a fertile floodplain of the Son River which is a tributary of the Ganges.

The climate is sub-tropical and typical of the plains of Northern India, with hot dry summers and cool winters with cold nighttime temperatures. The monsoon season, from late June to in late September, plays a fundamental role for the village and the surrounding area because the economy is mainly based on agriculture.
