= Ghaslo Ki Dhani =

Village in Rajasthan, India

Ghaslo Ki Dhani is a village of Kishangarh tahsil, Ajmer district, Rajasthan, India.
