= Meharon Ki Dhani =

Village in Rajasthan, India

Meharon ki Dhani
- Village
- Location within Rajasthan Location within India
- Coordinates: 26°09′29″N 70°54′19″E
- Country: India
- State: Rajasthan
- District: Jaisalmer
- Founded: 1910
- Founder: Mehar family

Population (2001)
  - Total: 745

Languages
  - Official: Sindhi
- Literacy: Male: 50%, Female: 10%

Meharon ki Dhani is a village in Jaisalmer district of Rajasthan state in India. It is located around 128 kilometres from the district headquarters, Jaisalmer. It is famous for the granite stone "Lakha Red".

== History ==
The village at its current location was founded in 1910. Second phase of development started after the beginning of granite mining.

== Demographics ==
Most of the people of village believe in Islam, and are Sindhis Muslim. They speak Sindhi. As of 2001 India census, Meharon ki dhani had a population of 745 with 387 male and 358 female. This village has a below average literacy rate, male literacy is 50 percent, and female literacy is around 10 percent. People are spending heavily on boys' education but female education is still not common because of conservative nature of society.

== Economy ==
The granite industry is rapidly growing in this village because of red stone. First granite quarry was started in 1998 by a Gujarati businessman, now there are around 30 granite quarries and 1 tile cutting factory running in the outskirts of village. Because of granite industry some other industries like transport and dairy have grown in recent years.

The main occupation of resident of this village is farming. People grow pearl millet (bajra), pulses in the monsoon season and wheat and cash crop like cumin (jeera) and mustard in winter season. Few years back people were only relied on monsoon rain for their farming but now irrigated farms are becoming more common.

Some people also keep sheep and goat herd for milk, meat and wool. But this occupation is becoming extinct because low profit and availability of well paid jobs in granite industry.

== Education ==
There is middle school in the village with a computer center, volleyball Court and cricket ground. Because of good income from granite sector and irrigated farming people are sending their children to cities like Sikar, Jaipur, Jodhpur and Kota to provide quality education. Village has maximum number of graduate and government servant in all Muslim village of district.

== Transportation ==
The village is well connected with roads. It is connected with road to nearby cities like Barmer, Jaisalmer, Jodhpur. Now-a-days people prefer to use private vehicle over public transport because of low frequency and overcrowding.
