= Udayaravichandrika =

Janya raga of Carnatic music

Udayaravichandrika/Shuddha Dhanyasi
- Mela: Kharaharapriya
- Chakra: Veda
- Arohanam: S G₁ M₁ P N₁ Ṡ
- Avarohanam: Ṡ N₁ P M₁ G₁ S
- Chhaya svaras: G₁ N₁
- Equivalent: Raag Dhani; Minor pentatonic scale Chinese Scale

Udayaravichandrika, or Shuddha Dhanyasi, is a rāgam in Carnatic music (musical scale of South Indian classical music). It is an audava rāgam (or owdava rāgam, meaning pentatonic scale). It is a janya rāgam (derived scale), as it does not have all the seven swaras (musical notes). Closer to Udayaravichandrika in Hindustani music is Dhani aka Gaundgiri. But Dhani has N2 while Udayaravichandrika N3 in theory. Its Western equivalent is the Minor pentatonic scale. This raga has a great association with the Chinese musicology, which is highly influenced by this raga, and is also called the "Chinese Scale". The Prati Madhyamam (M₂) equivalent of this raga is "Sumanesaranjani" (alias "Samudrapriya"), whose Hindustani Equivalent is "Madhukauns"

== Structure and Lakshana ==
Udayaravichandrika scale with shadjam at C

Udayaravichandrika is a symmetric rāgam that does not contain rishabham or dhaivatam. It is a pentatonic scale (audava-audava rāgam in Carnatic music classification – audava meaning 'of five') and is equivalent to the minor pentatonic scale in Western music. Its ārohaṇa-avarohaṇa structure (ascending and descending scale) is as follows (see swaras in Carnatic music for details on below notation and terms):

The notes used in this scale sadharana gandharam, shuddha madhyamam, panchamam and kaisiki nishadham. Udayaravichandrika is considered a janya rāgam of Kharaharapriya, the 22nd melakarta rāgam, though it can be derived from other melakarta rāgams, Hanumatodi, Natabhairavi or Natakapriya, by dropping both rishabham and dhaivatam.

Udayaravichandrika and the raga Suddha Dhanyasi are closely related, so much that many performers treat the two as interchangeable. Some contemporary practitioners consider Suddha Dhanyasi as more inflected (i.e., using more gamakas), and Udayaravichandrika to be more in the Hindustani tradition with almost bare (i.e., uninflected) notes. Puritans, however, refer to the fact that Udayaravichandrika is an ancient raga in the Venkatamakhin tradition and was reputed to be created by Muthuswamy Dikshitar himself. However, at that time, it had kakali nishadam rather than the kaisiki nishadam of Suddha Dhanyasi.

However, the Kaisaki nishadam is used in this topic making more towards Sudha Dhanyasi. The Udaya Ravichandrika, in its pure form should have the following arohana and avarohana:

arohanam      = S G₂ M₁ P N₃ Ṡ
avarohanam    = Ṡ N₃ P M₁ G₂ S
