= Mohanpur, Rewari =

Mohanpur
- village
- Location in Rewari, Haryana, India Mohanpur (India)
- Coordinates: 28°N 76.5°E
- Country: India
- State: Haryana
- District: Rewari

Languages
  - Official: Hindi
- Time zone: UTC+5:30 (IST)
- PIN: 123401
- ISO 3166 code: IN-HR
- Vehicle registration: HR36
- Nearest city: Rewari
- Sex ratio: 1:1 ♂/♀
- Literacy: 100%
- Website: www.rewari.gov.in

Mohanpur is a village in Bawal Tehsil in Rewari District of Haryana State, India. It is located 22 kilometres (14 mi) towards South from District Rewari. 8 kilometres (5.0 mi) from Bawal. It is 349 kilometres (217 mi) from State capital Chandigarh.

== Demographics ==
Source	Households	Total Population	Males 50.83%	Females 49.16%	Total Literates 72.85%	Male Literates 57.83%	Female Literates 42.16%	Child (0-6) age group 12.89%
Census of India 2011	319	1621	824	797	1181	683	498	209

== See also ==
- Bawal Block of Rewari
- Rewari
