= Abheri =

Janya raga of Carnatic music

- Arohanam: S G₂ M₁ P N₂ Ṡ
- Avarohanam: Ṡ N₂ D₂ P M₁ G₂ R₂ S

Abheri (pronounced ābhēri) is a raga in Carnatic music (musical scale of South Indian classical music). It is a Janya raga (derived scale), whose Melakarta raga (parent, also known as janaka) is Kharaharapriya, 22nd in the 72 Melakarta raga system.

Bhimpalasi (or Bheempalas) and Dhanashree of Hindustani music sounds close to Abheri.

== Structure and Lakshana ==
Ascending scale with Shadjam at C

Descending scale with Shadjam at C

Abheri is an audava-sampoorna Raga. Its ārohaṇa-avarohaṇa structure (ascending and descending scale) is as follows (see swaras in Carnatic music for details on below notation and terms):

- ārohaṇa : S G₂ M₁ P N₂ Ṡ (Note: Alternate notations: Hindustani: S G̱ M P Ṉ Ṡ; Western: C E♭ F G B♭ C)
- avarohaṇa : Ṡ N₂ D₂ P M₁ G₂ R₂ S (Note: Alternate notations: Hindustani: Ṡ Ṉ D P M G̱ R S; Western: C B♭ A G F E♭ D C)

Abheri

The swaras in this scale are Chathusruthi Rishabham, Sadharana Gandharam, Suddha Madhyamam, Chathusruthi Dhaivatham and Kaisiki Nishadham.

There are some differing views on swaras in the scale of Abheri. It is considered a Bhashanga raga (scale has an anya swara, that is, a note which is not in the parent melakarta raga, in this case Kharaharapriya raga), with introduction of Suddha Dhiavatham (D1) in some phrases of the raga. A different view is that this raga is a janya of Natabhairavi (which has D1, suddha dhaivatham, in place of D2), with D2 being the anya swara (external note).

The original Abheri had Shuddha Dhaivatam and not Chathushruthi Dhaivatham in the Avarohanam, making it a Janya of Natabhairavi and not Kharaharapriya but was changed due to influences of Hindustani Bhimpalasi into the present form. R. Vedavalli sings the version of Nagumomu with Shuddha Dhaivatam. Today only one Muthuswami Dikshitar Krithi called Veenabheri and Kandha Vandharul of Papanasam Sivan are sung in the original. In fact, all books published before 1960 classify it as a Natabhairavi Janya. Syama Sastri's Ninnuvina Marigalada rendered in Reethigowla was originally composed in the old Abheri with D1. This has been rendered by Vedavalli too. In the 1st half of the 20th century, Nagumomu was also sung with D1 till it changed. It makes sense to sing Nagumomu with D1 as Thyagarajaswami pleads to Rama to not torment him so it gives a more melancholic mood.

In fact, there are 2 separate versions of Abheri which possess D1:

1. The one used by Thyagarajaswami has N2 in Arohanam

Aro: S G2 M1 P N2 S Av: S N2 D1 P M1 G2 R2 S

2. Dikshitar's version has no N2 in Arohanam. He also uses Vakra Prayoga S M1 G2 M1. S G2 M1 and P N2 S Prayogas are not allowed in his variant. N2 S is allowed, perhaps in a P S N2 S Prayoga.

Aro: S M1 G2 M1 P P S S Av: S N2 D1 P M1 G2 R2 S

== See also ==
- List of Film Songs based on Ragas
