= Daughter-in-law (disambiguation) =

Daughter-in-law is a kinship relationship as a result of marriage.

Daughter-in-law may also refer to:

- Daughter-in-Law, or Bahurani, a 1940 Indian Hindi-language film
- Daughter-in-Law (1995 film), a Taiwanese film starring Kuo Tzu-chien
- Daughters-in-Law, a 2007–08 South Korean television series

== See also ==
- In-law (disambiguation)
- Bahurani (disambiguation)
