= Mahant Ghasidas Memorial Museum, Raipur =

Mahant Ghasidas Memorial Museum
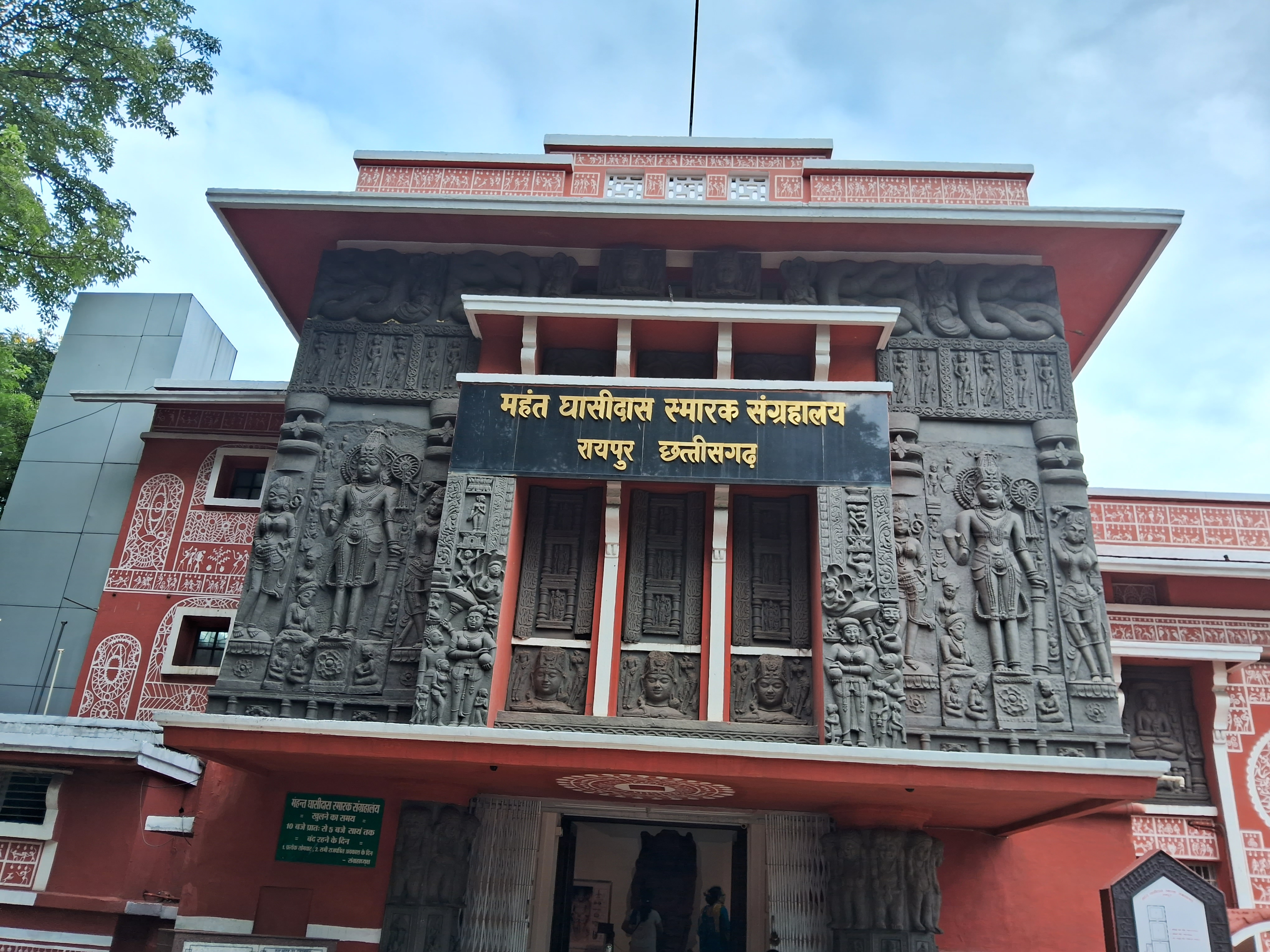
- Mahant Ghasidas Museum entrance
- Established: 1875
- Location: Raj Bhawan Road, Raipur, Chhattisgarh, India
- Coordinates: 21.243°N 81.645°E
- Type: Archaeological Museum
- Visitors: 30,000
- Architect: Mahant Raja Ghasi Das

Mahant Ghasidas Memorial Museum is an archaeological museum in Raipur, Chhattisgarh, India. It is located near the Ghadi Chowk in the heart of the city and it is one of the oldest museums of Chhattisgarh in history.

== History ==
This museum was built by Mahant Raja Ghasi Das in 1875, and was renovated by the former queen Jyoti Devi and her son, Digvijay Das in 1953, after the State had ceased to exist. The new building of the museum was inaugurated by the first president of India, Rajendra Prasad.

== Gallery ==
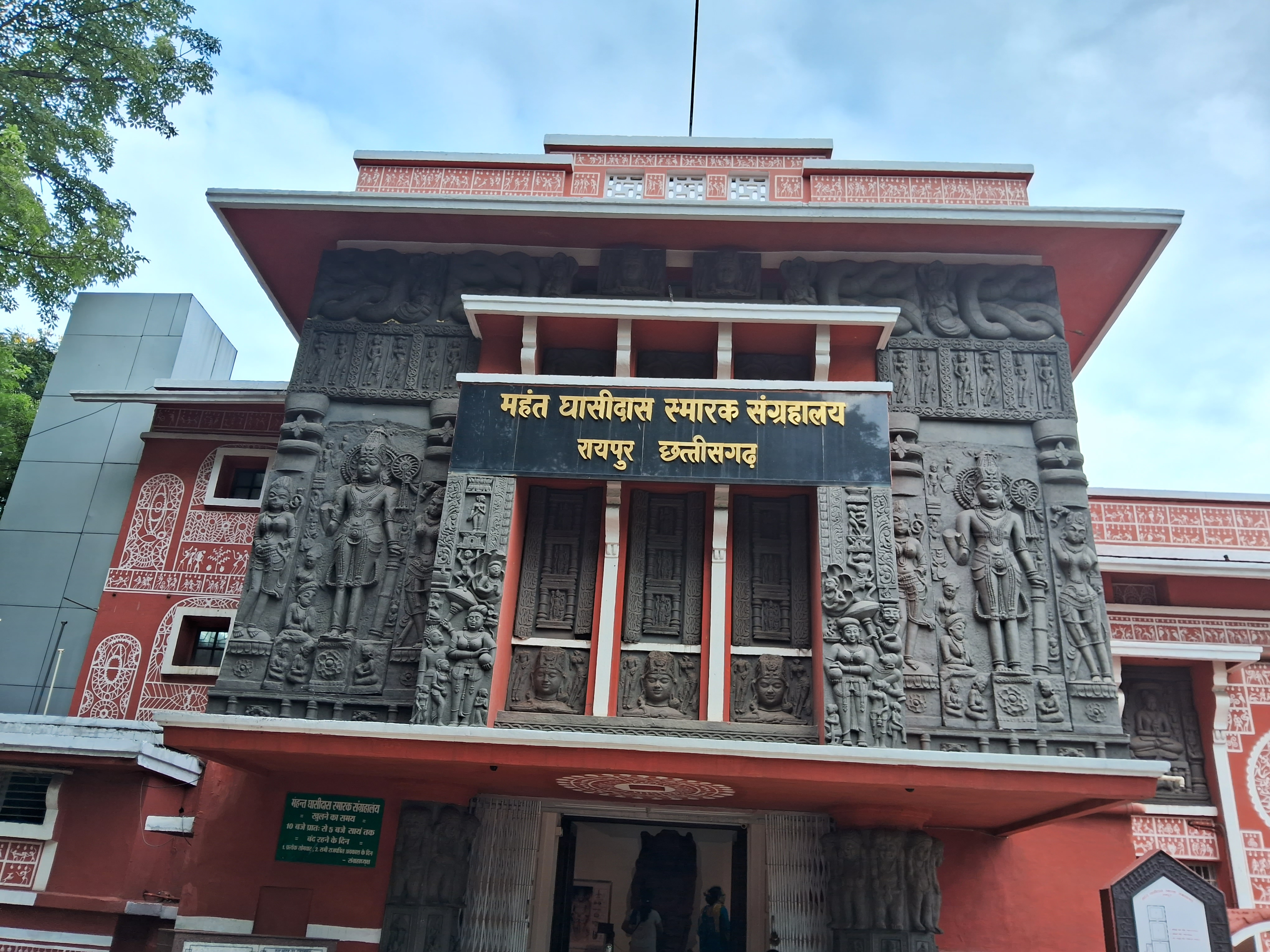

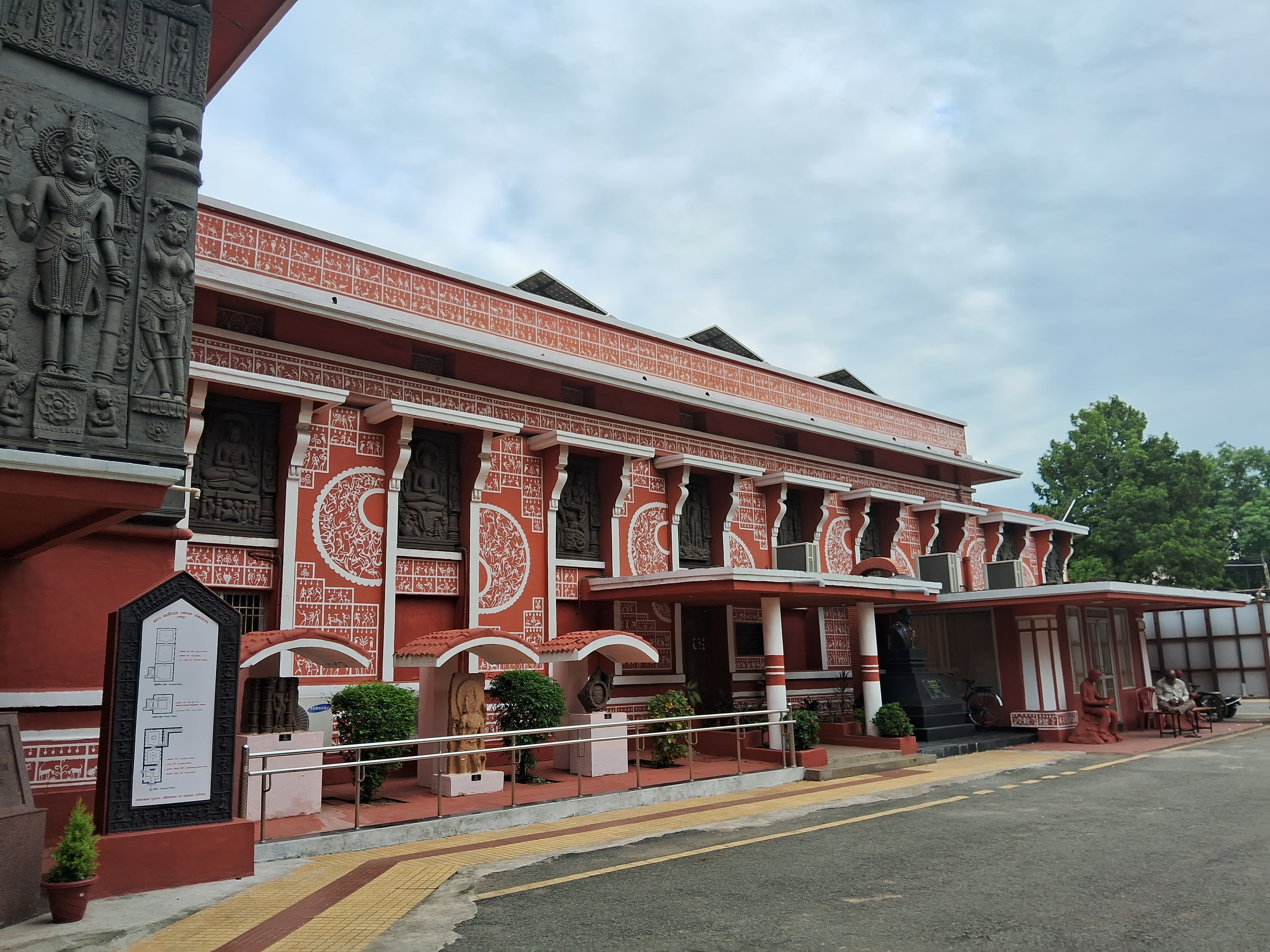

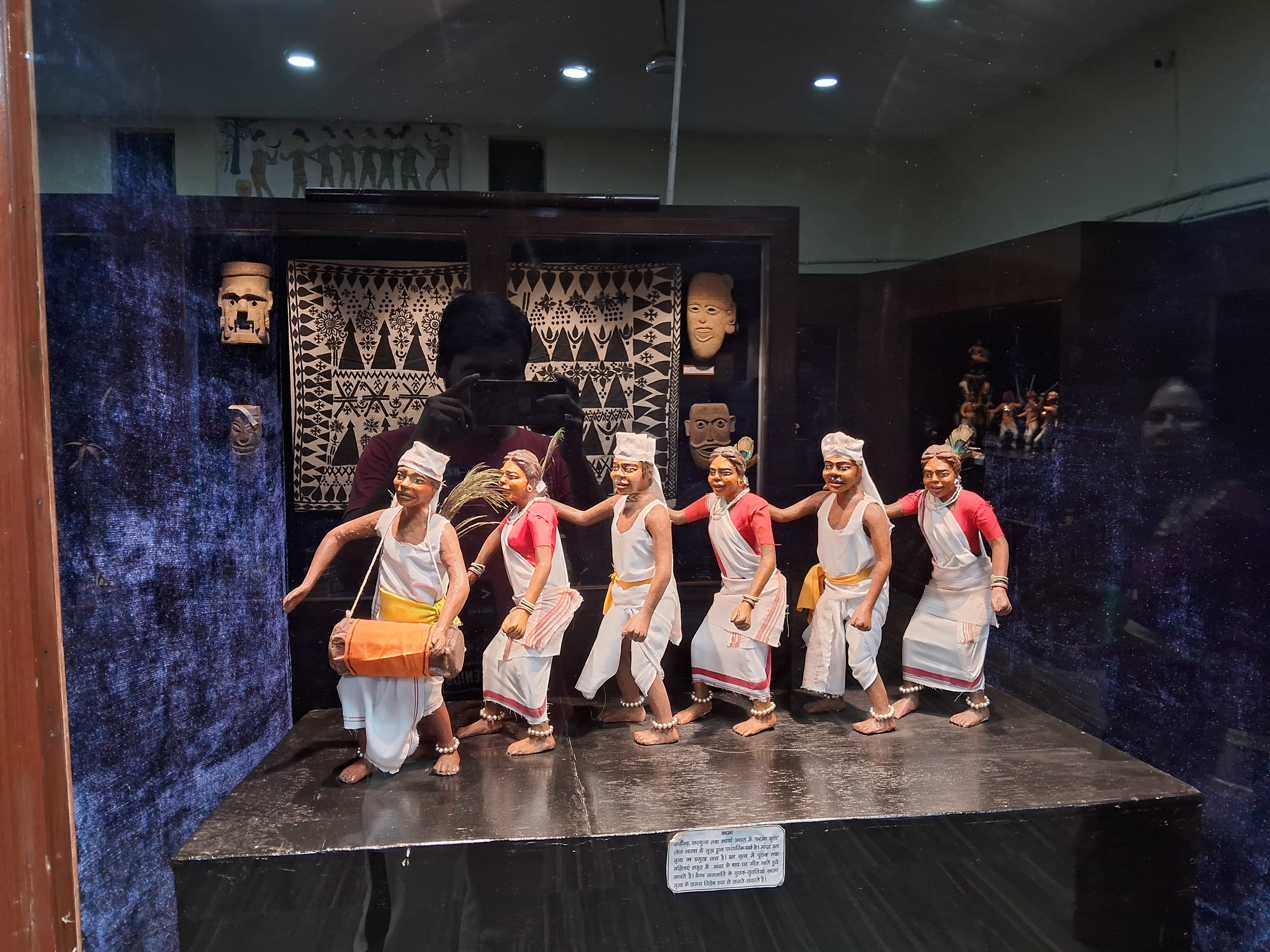

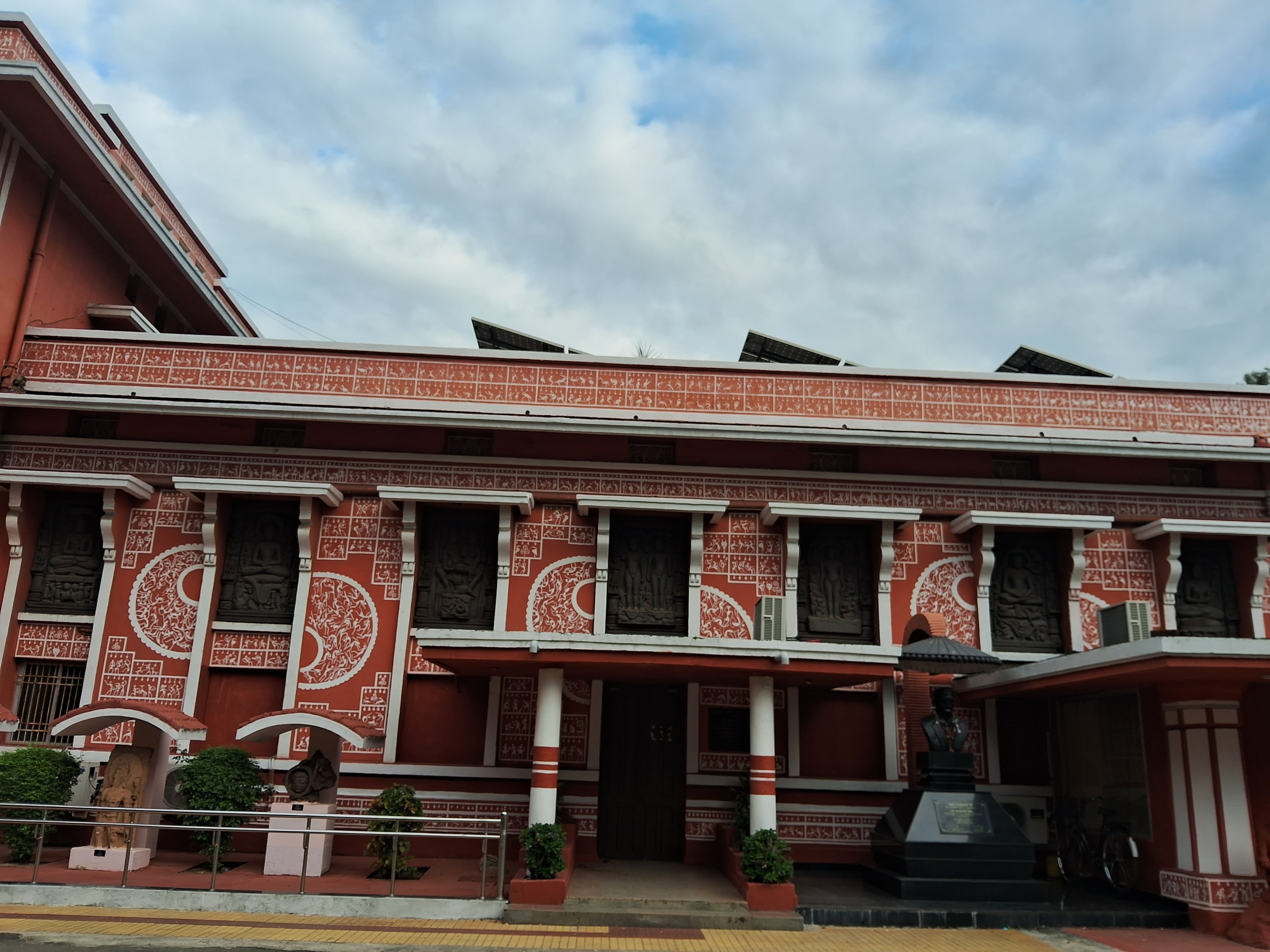

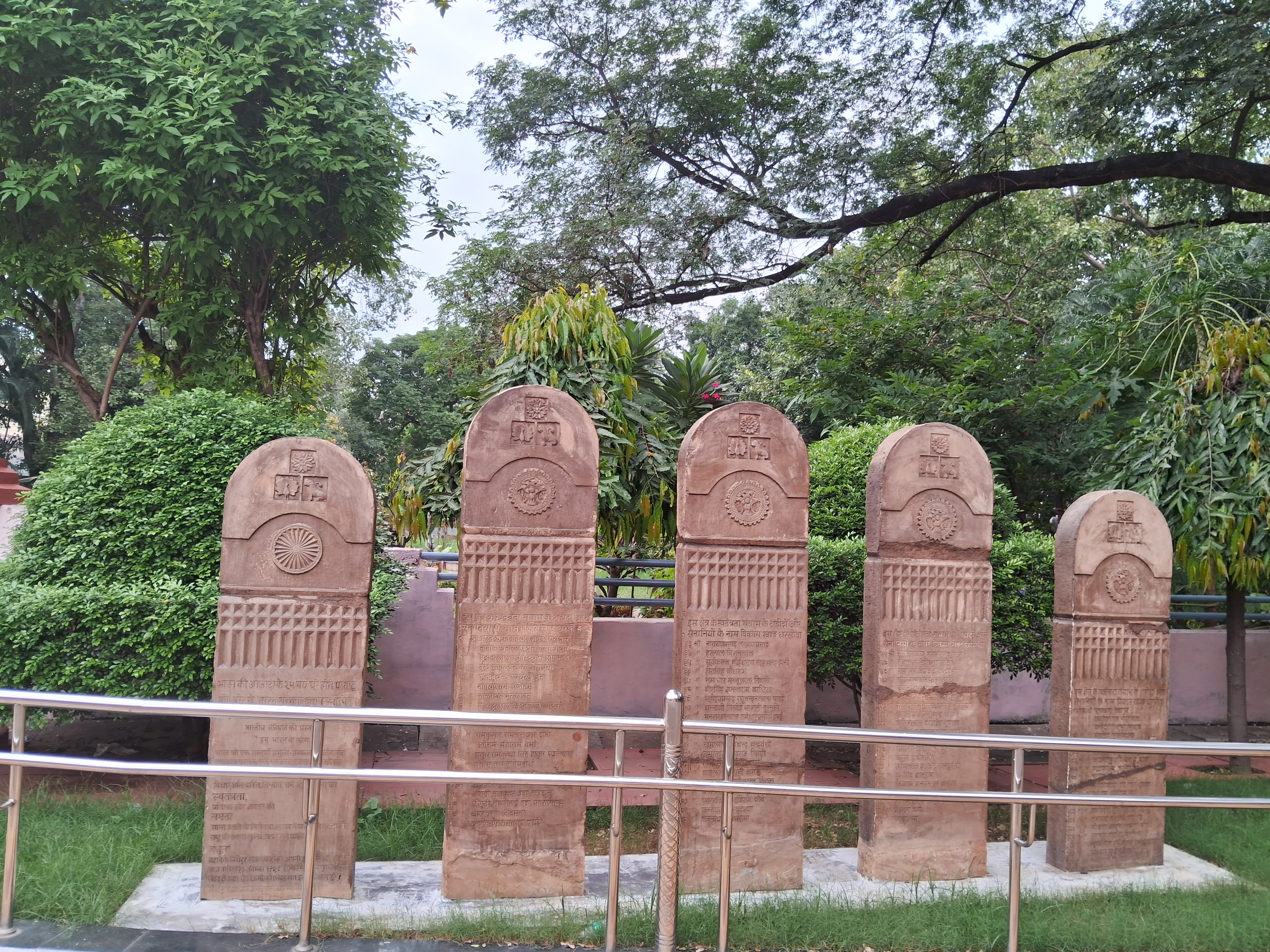

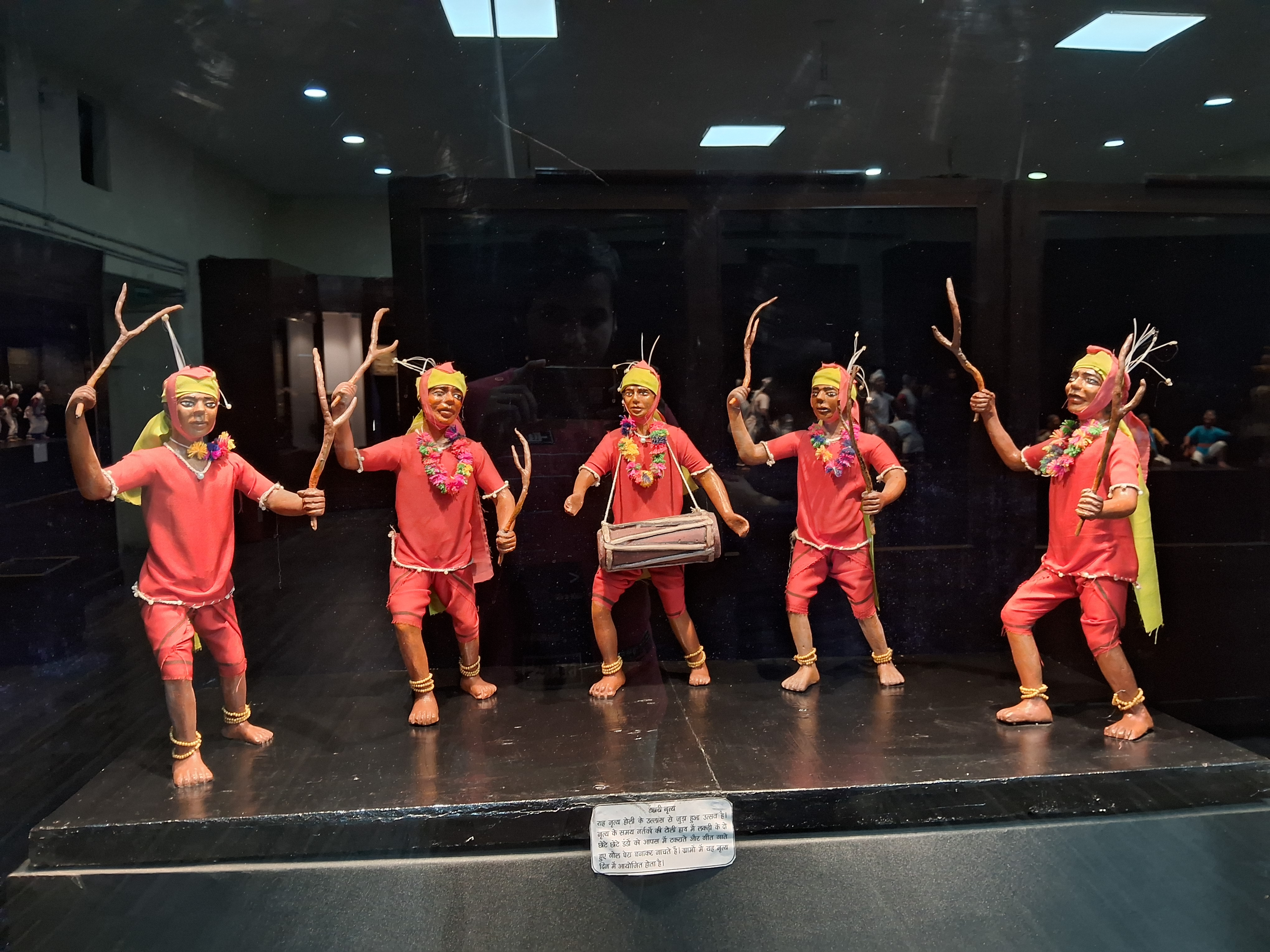

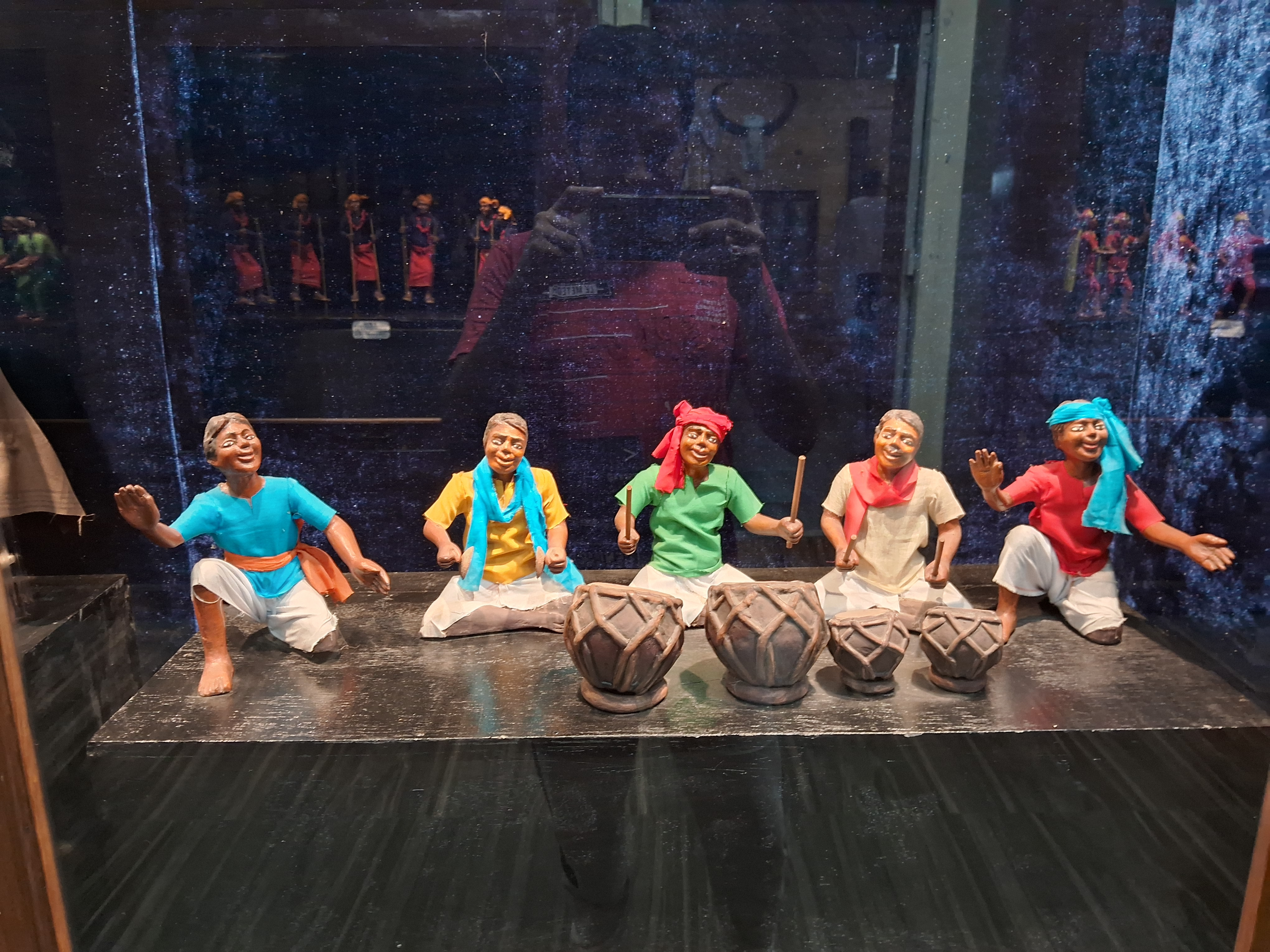

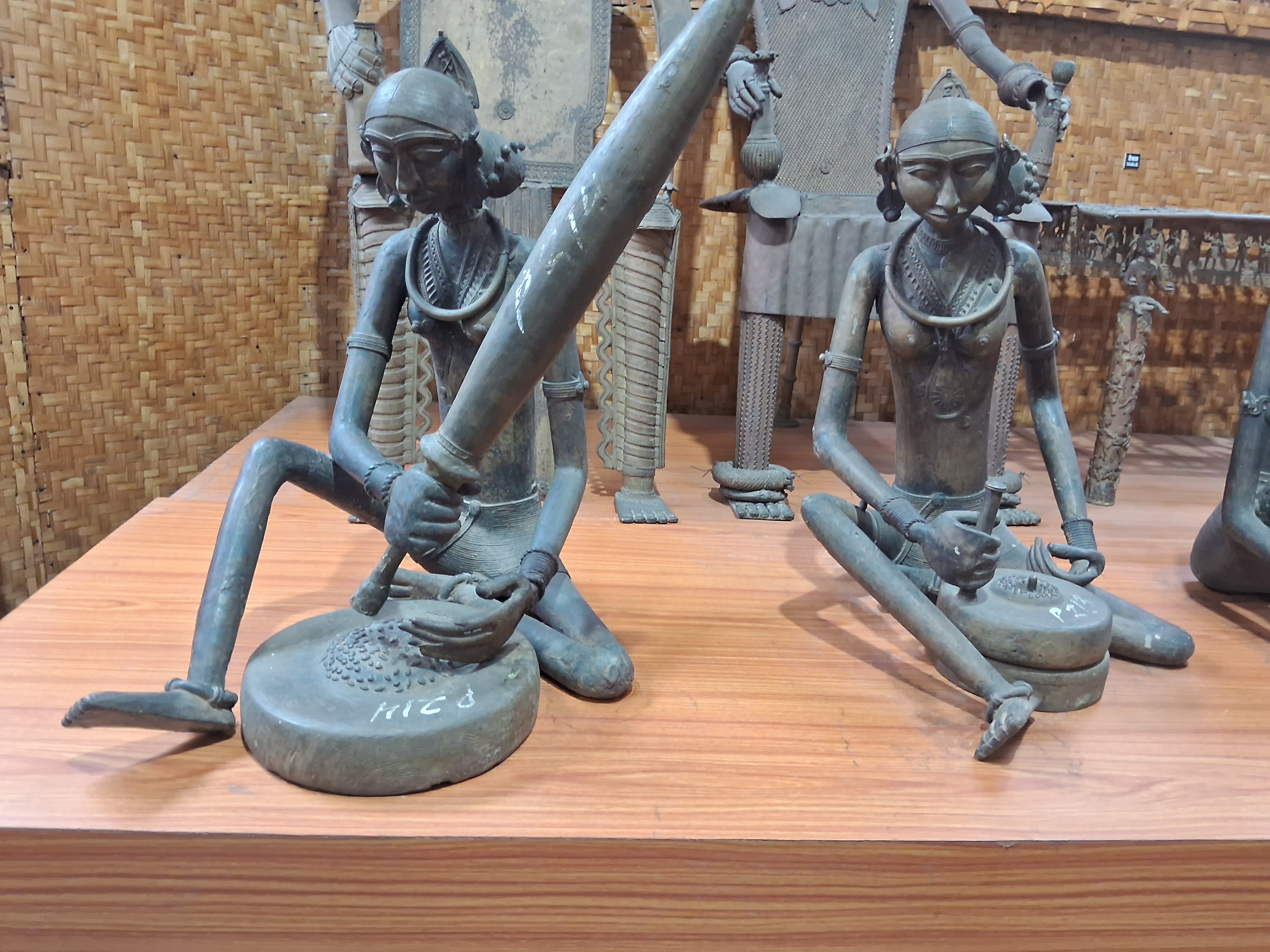

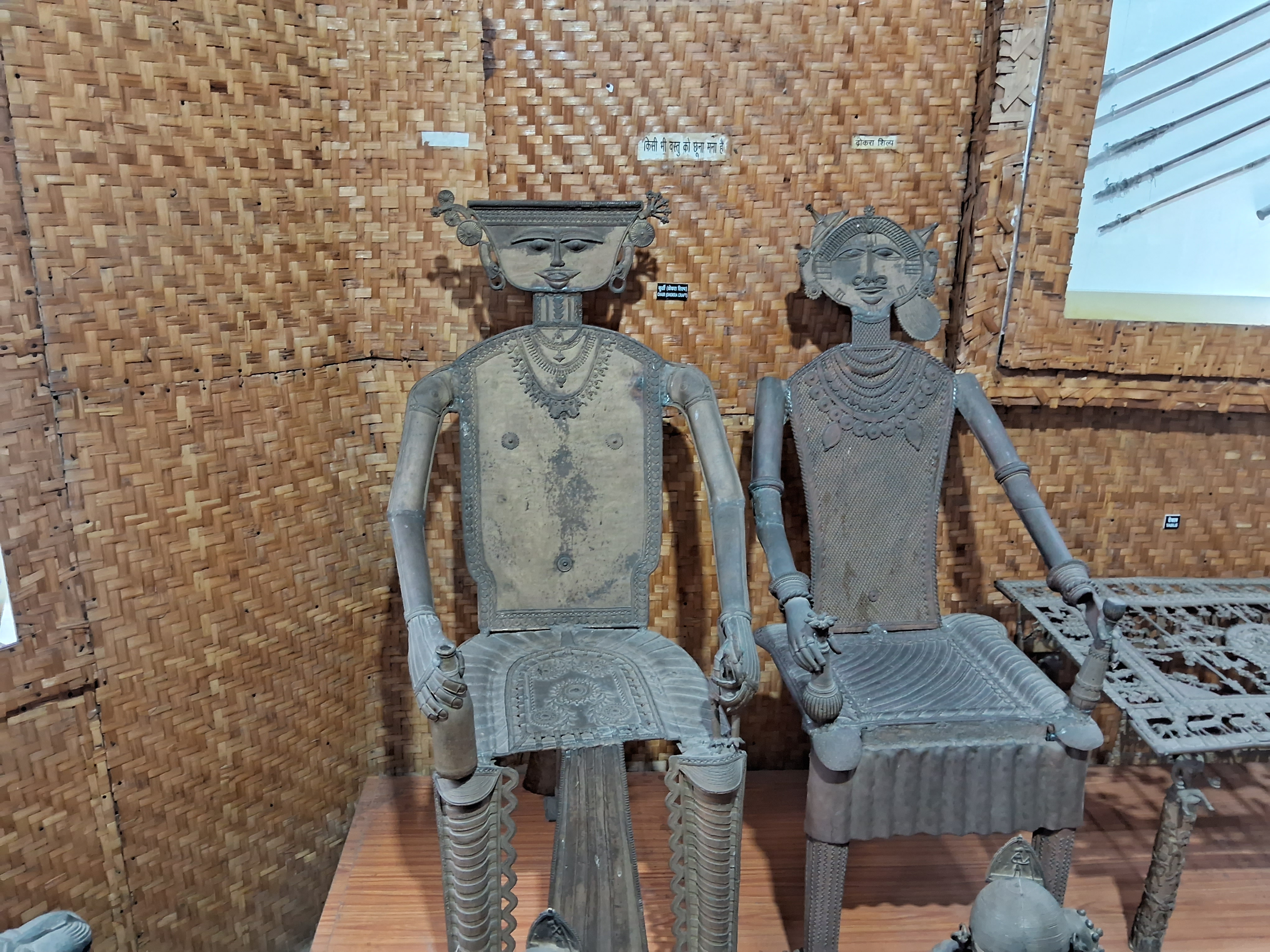

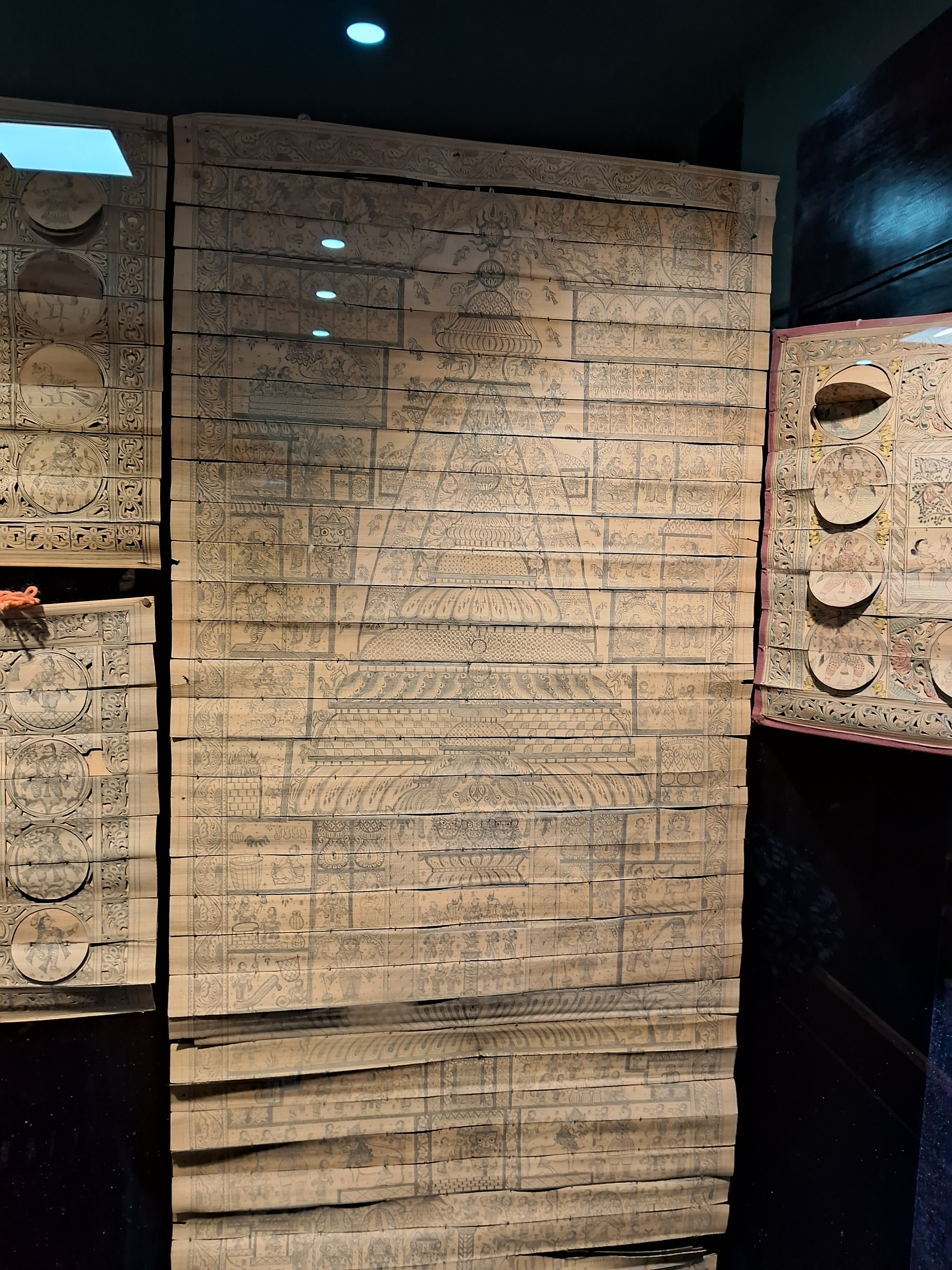

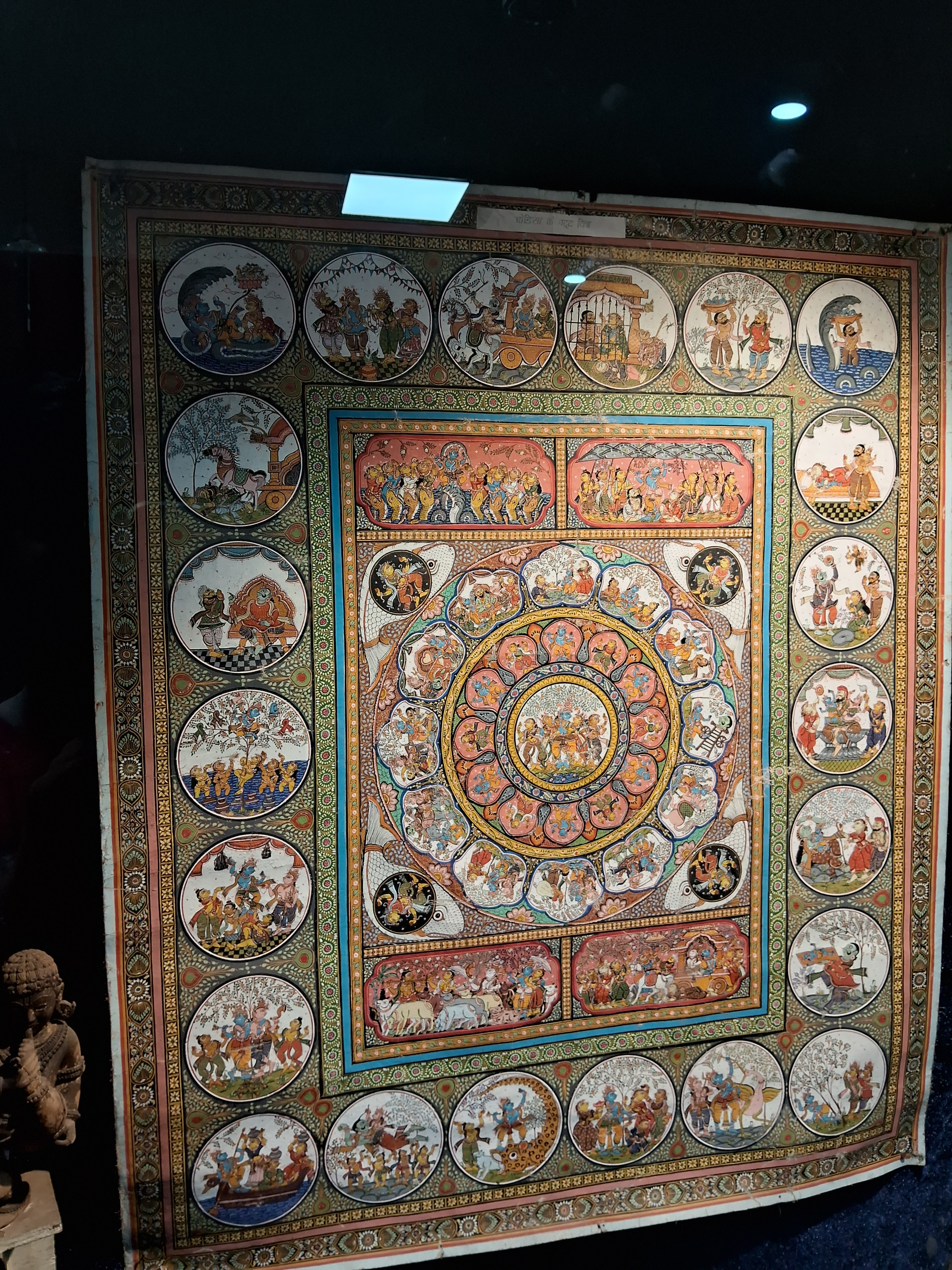

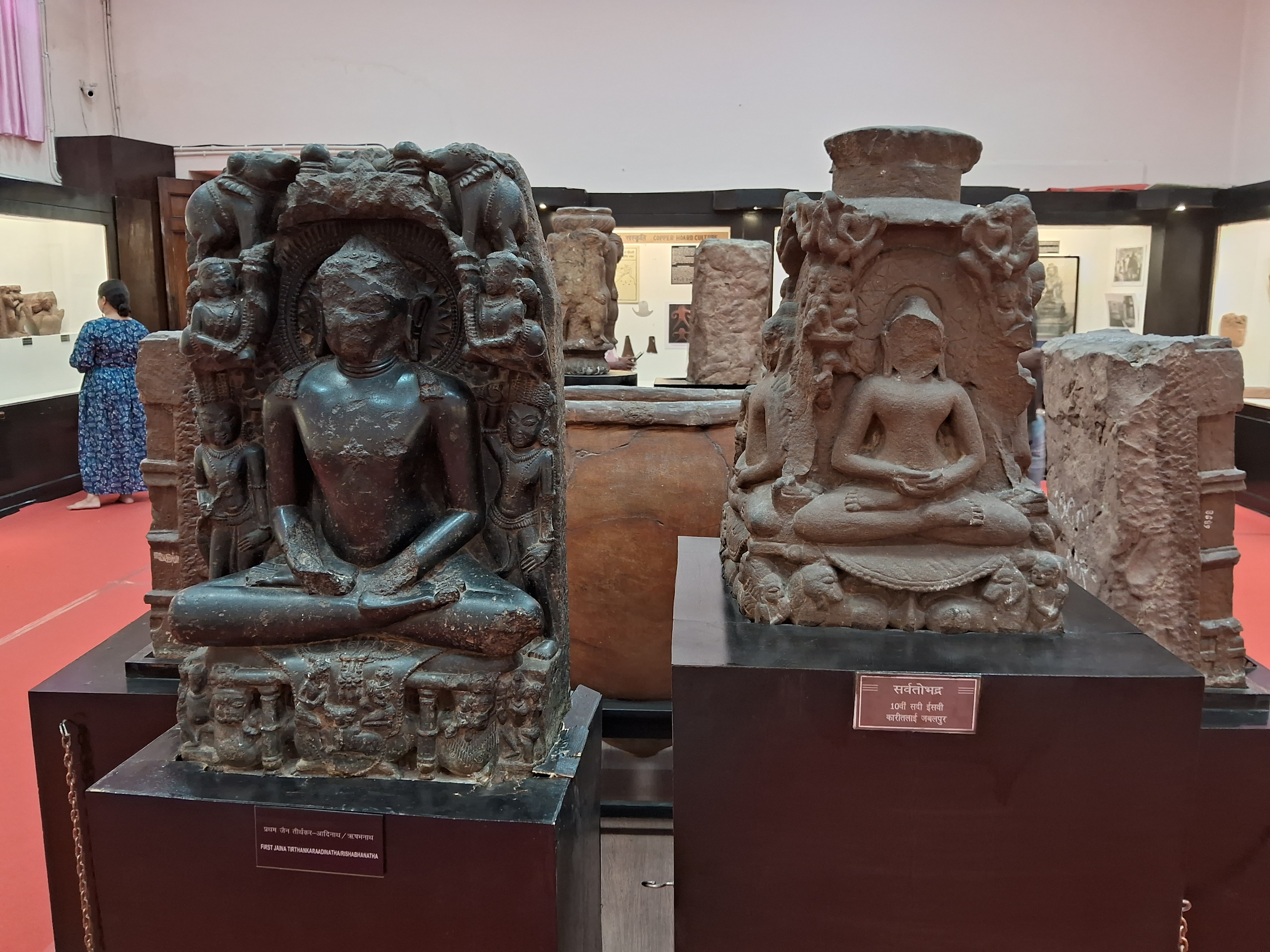

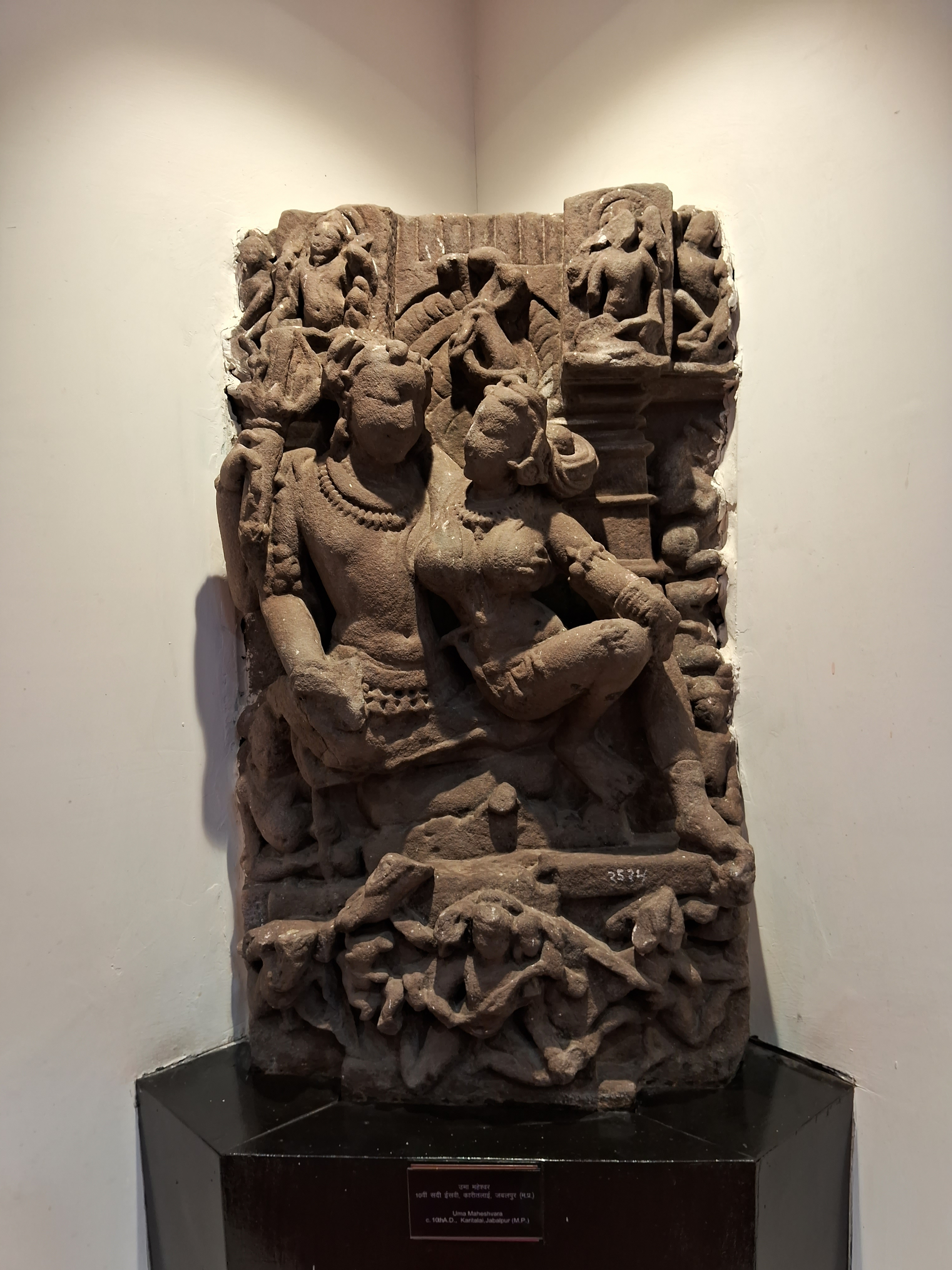

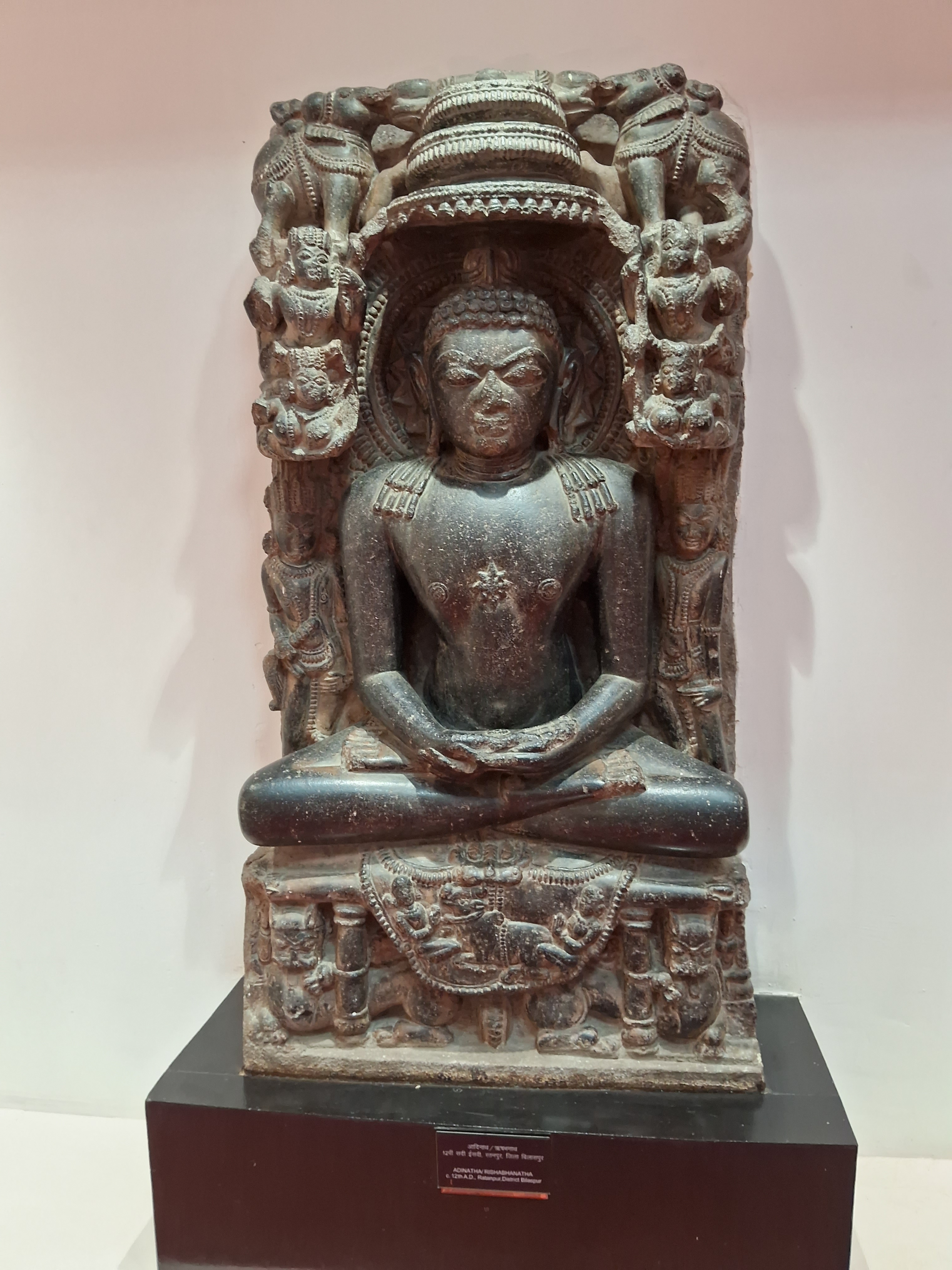

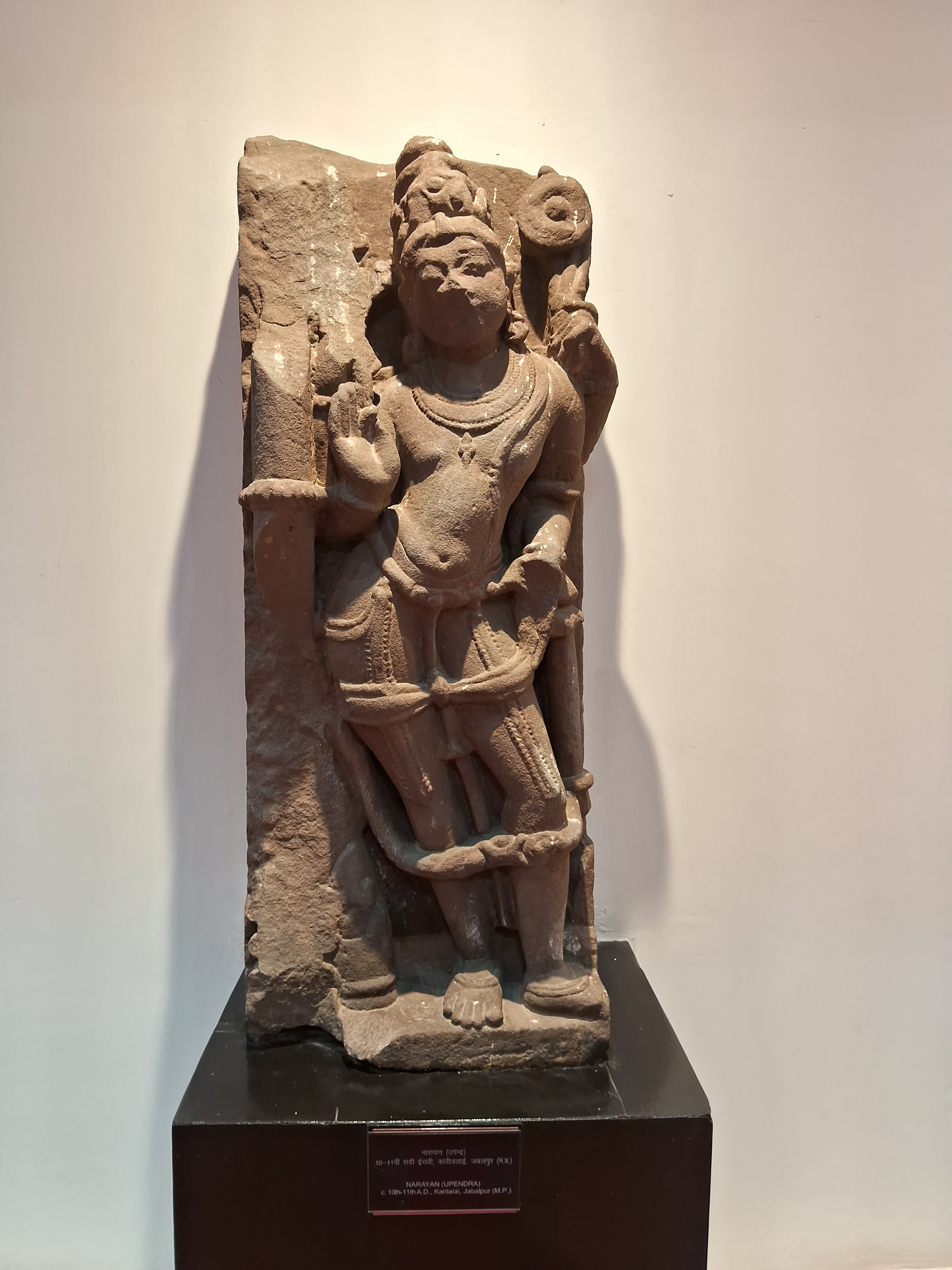

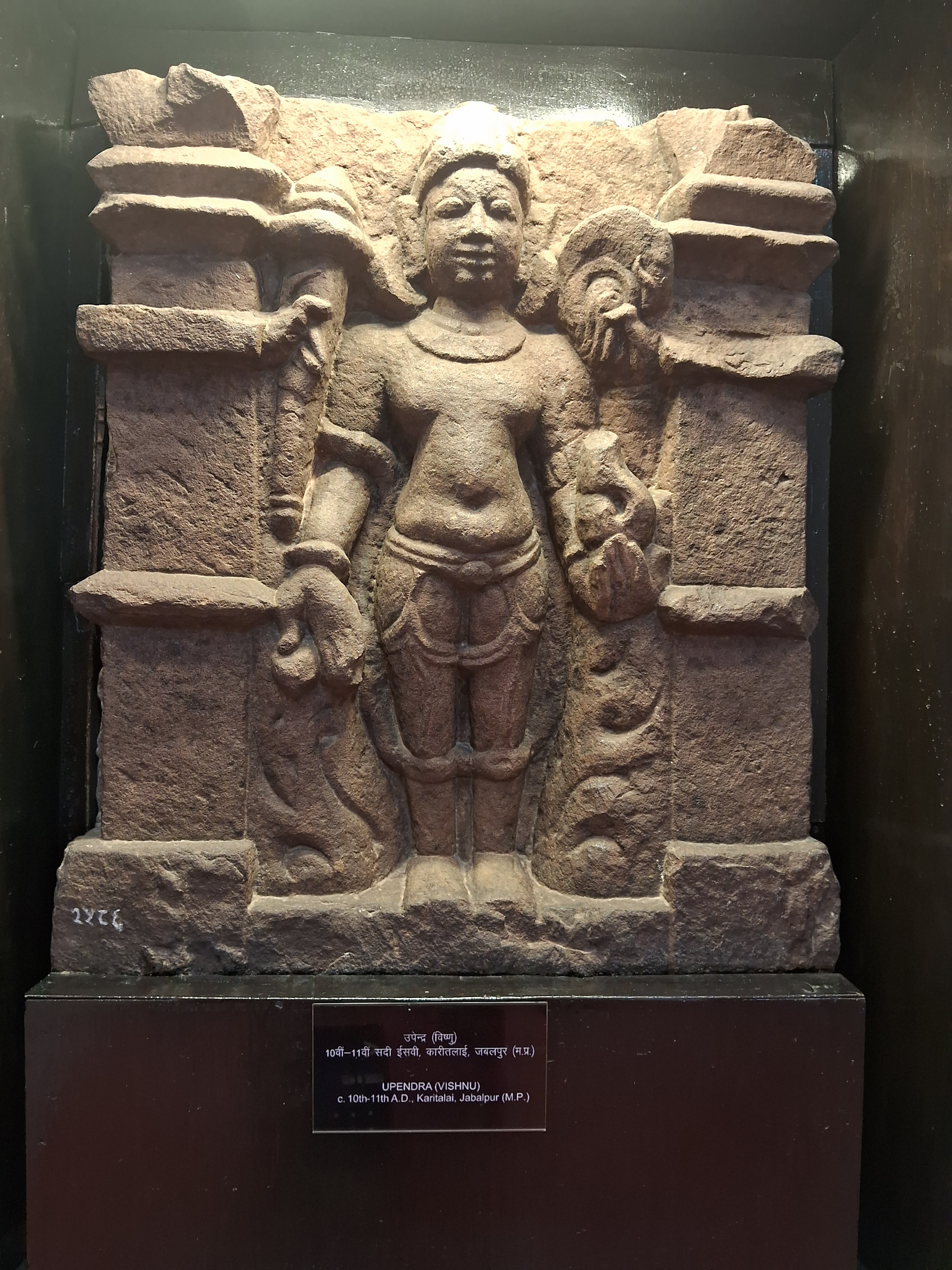
