= Kishore Sahu =

Indian actor

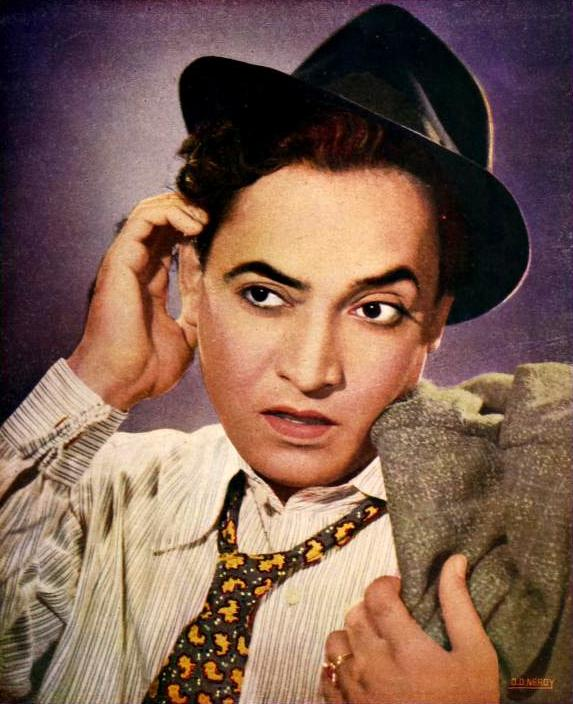
- Born: 22 October 1915; Rajnandgaon, Nandgaon State, Central Provinces and Berar, British India (present-day Chhattisgarh, India)
- Died: 22 August 1980 (aged 64); Bangkok, Thailand
- Education: University of Nagpur
- Occupations: Actor; Film director
- Years active: 1937–1980
- Spouse(s): Preeti Sahu; Snehprabha Pradhan (1940-1943)
- Children: 4

Kishore Sahu (22 October 1915 – 22 August 1980) was an Indian actor, film director, screenwriter, and producer. He appeared in 22 films between 1937 and 1980, and he directed 20 films between 1942 and 1974.

== Early life ==
Sahu was born in present-day Rajnandgaon district in India. His father was the prime minister under the Raja of Rajnandgaon State. He joined the University of Nagpur and took part in the "freedom struggle", completing his graduation in 1937. An interest in writing short stories brought him in contact with cinema, where he initially started as an actor.

== Personal life ==
Sahu was briefly married to his Punar Milan (1940) co-star Snehprabha Pradhan before the relationship ended in 1943 after a court battle. His second wife was Preeti Pandey a Kumaoni Brahmin. Through his second wife, he had four children, Vimal Sahu, Naina Sahu, Mamta Sahu, and Rohit Sahu.

== Career highlights ==
His directorial venture Kuwara Baap was one of the winners for the BFJA - Best Indian Films Award for best film for 1943. His film Raja has been called "a milestone of art and skill in motion pictures". His film Veer Kunal was a huge box office success. He directed Dilip Kumar with Kamini Kaushal in Nadiya Ke Paar, which became the sixth highest grossing Indian film of 1948. His 1954 film Mayurpankh was entered into the 1954 Cannes Film Festival, where it was nominated for the Grand Prize of the Festival. Sawan Aya Re did well commercially, with Baburao Patel of Filmindia remarking in the 9 May 1949 edition that Sahu's estimate had risen due to the "original treatment" he gave to an "otherwise ordinary" story. He was also known for the Meena Kumari starrer, Dil Apna Aur Preet Parai (1960).

== Filmography ==
Films as actor
Year	Title		Director	Writer	Actor	Role	Notes
1937	Jeevan Prabhat				Yes	Ramu	Debut as an actor
1940	Bahurani				Yes		
1940	Punar Milan				Yes		
1942	Kunwara Baap		Yes		Yes		
1943	Raja		Yes		Yes		
1943	Shararat		Yes		Yes		
1944	Insaan				Yes		
1945	Veer Kunal	Yes	Yes	Yes	Yes		
1947	Sindoor		Yes		Yes		
1947	Sajan		Yes				
1948	Nadiya Ke Par		Yes				
1949	Sawan Aya Re		Yes		Yes	Anand	
1949	Rhimjhim				Yes		
1949	Namoona				Yes	Barrister Kedarnath	
1951	Kali Ghata		Yes		Yes	Ram Narayan	
1951	Buzdil				Yes		
1952	Zalzala				Yes		
1952	Sapna				Yes		
1952	Hamari Duniya				Yes	Meena	
1954	Mayurpankh		Yes		Yes	Ranjit Singh	
1954	Hamlet		Yes		Yes	Hamlet	
1956	Kismet Ka Khel		Yes				
1957	Bare Sarkar		Yes		Yes	Pratap Singh	
1958	Kala Pani				Yes	Rai Bahadur Jaswant Rai	
1960	Dil Apna Aur Preet Parai		Yes				
1960	Love in Simla				Yes	General Rajpal Singh	
1960	Kala Bazar				Yes	Public Prosecutor	
1963	Grahasti						
1963	Ghar Basake Dekho						
1965	Guide				Yes	Marco	
1965	Poonam Ki Raat		Yes		Yes	Doctor	
1967	Hare Kanch Ki Chooriyan		Yes				
1969	Beti				Yes	Mr. Verma	
1970	Pushpanjali		Yes		Yes	Jamal Pasha	
1971	Gambler				Yes	Public Prosecutor	
1971	Hare Rama Hare Krishna				Yes	Jaiswal	
1974	Dhuen Ki Lakeer		Yes				
1982	Vakil Babu				Yes	Justice Rajvansh	

=== Writer ===
Films as writer
Year	Title	What wrote	Notes
1954	Mayurpankh	Screenplay	
1960	Dil Apna Aur Preet Parai	Story	
1967	Hare Kanch Ki Chooriyan	Dialogue, Screenplay, Story	
1967	Aurat	Dialogue	
1968	Teen Bahuraniyan	Screenplay	
1970	Pushpanjali	Screenplay, Story, Dialogue	
1977	Apnapan	Screenplay, Story, Dialogue	

=== Producer ===
- Bahurani (1940)
- Sawan Aya Re (1949)
- Hamara Ghar (1950)
- Kali Ghata (1951)
- Mayurpankh (1954)
- Poonam Ki Raat (1965)
- Hare Kanch Ki Chooriyan (1967)
- Pushpanjali (1970)
