= Vajifdar =

Vajifdar is a surname. Notable people with the surname include:

- Hormasji Vajifdar (1894–1961), Indian cricketer
- Shirin Vajifdar (died 2017), Indian classical dancer
