= Mahant Raja Sarveshwar Das =

Bairagi King of Nandgaon State

10th Raja of Nandgaon
- Reign: 1913 - 1940
- Coronation: 2 June 1913
- Predecessor: Mahant Raja Rajendra Das
- Successor: Mahant Raja Digvijay Das
- Born: 30 March 1906
- Died: 18 September 1940
- Spouse: Rani Jayanti Devi
- Dynasty: Bairagi
- Father: Dau Shyam Charan
- Religion: Hinduism

Mahant Raja Sarveshwar Das (1906-1940) was the ruler of the princely state of Nandgaon in the present-day Rajnandgaon District of Chhattisgarh, India.

== Early life ==
Sarveshwar Das completed his primary education from Rajkumar College, Raipur then he went to London for higher education. He succeeded to the throne of Nandgaon State in 1927 after the death of Mahant Raja Rajendra Das.

It was a convoluted succession. Mahant Raja Balram Das had died childless, at which time his widow, queen Suryamukhi, adopted Rajendra Das as her son and the next ruler of Nandgaon. The adoptee died soon after and Shyamcharan, father of Sarveshwar Das, was selected to be the next ruler of Nandgaon by family members and disciples. But he was so old that he was not able to govern and Sarveshwar Das became de facto ruler.

== Personal life ==
He married Jayanti Devi, princess of Mayurbhanj State, in 1932. He died on 18 September 1940.
