= Shirin Vajifdar =

Indian classical dancer

- Born: Bombay, Bombay Presidency (now in Maharashtra)
- Died: 29 September 2017
- Occupations: Dancer; choreographer; instructor; critic
- Spouse: Mulk Raj Anand (m. 1950; died 2004)
- Career
- Dances: Kathak

Shirin Vajifdar (died 29 September 2017) was an Indian classical dancer, choreographer, instructor and critic. She was one of the first Parsis who took up Indian classical dance. A doyenne of Kathak, she was an acclaimed performer and teacher. Her choreography in the film Mayurpankh (1954) was lauded.

== Life ==
Shirin Vajifdar was born in Bombay, India. She had two younger sisters, Khurshid and Roshan. They were brought up in an orphanage in Bombay.

In the 1930s, defying the disapproval of her community, Vajifdar began to learn Kathak with Sunder Prasad, a teacher from the Jaipur Gharana. She also attended the Nrityalayam dance academy run by Madame Menaka in Khandala, at the same time as Shevanti Bhonsale and Damayanti Joshi. Here she learned other forms of Indian dance: Manipuri and Kathakali.

Vajifdar married Mulk Raj Anand in 1950. She was his second wife.

== Career ==
Vajifdar taught dance to Khurshid and Roshan, with whom she began to perform as the Vajifdar sisters. They trained in all the major schools of Indian dance, including Bharatnatyam and Mohiniattam.

The sisters were the first Parsis to perform Indian classical dance. While conservatives in the Parsi community were opposed to them, she received support from others.

The modernist dancer Ram Gopal was one of their instructors. Among the Vajifdars' contemporaries in performance were Mrinalini Sarabhai, Vyjayanthimala, and the Poovaiah sisters.

Vajifdar ran a dance academy, Nritya Manjari, in Cuffe Parade in Bombay. Along with Krishna Kutty, she founded the Nritya Darpana Society.

On the eve of Indian independence in 1947, Vajifdar and her pupils, The Marwari Belles, performed at Bombay's Taj Mahal Hotel.

In 1951, Vajifdar and her sisters toured South East Asia, performing and promoting Indian culture.

There do not appear to be any extant recordings of Vajifdar's performances. The Films Division of India had made a film, but it was lost. In 1952, she appeared on BBC Television.

In 1954, Vajifdar choreographed a dance sequence in Kishore Sahu's film Mayurpankh. Roshan and Khurshid performed in the sequence.

In 1955, she was part of a dance delegation to China. She essayed the role of Mohini and Bhasmasura with Krishna Kutty, to considerable acclaim.

By 1957, Vajifdar had retired from performance. She then began to write reviews of dance for the Times of India.

== Selected publications ==
- "'Menaka', Pioneer of Kathak Dance Drama". Marg – A Magazine of the Arts. XII (4). September 1959.
