= Pushpanjali (1970 film) =

- Directed by: Kishore Sahu
- Written by: Kishore Sahu
- Produced by: Kishore Sahu
- Starring: Sanjay Khan; Naina Sahu; Premnath; Om Prakash
- Cinematography: V. N. Reddy
- Edited by: Kantilal B. Shukla
- Music by: Laxmikant-Pyarelal
- Production company: Kishore Sahu Productions
- Release date: 25 September 1970
- Running time: 140 min
- Country: India
- Language: Hindi

Pushpanjali (An Offering of Flowers) is a 1970 Hindi, romantic drama film, produced and directed by Kishore Sahu. The film was made under the "Kishore Sahu Productions" banner. The story, screenplay and dialogues were by Kishore Sahu. Laxmikant Pyarelal composed the music for the film, with lyrics written by Anand Bakshi. Sanjay Khan, Naina Sahu, Kishore Sahu, Premnath, Faryal, Manmohan Krishan, Lalita Pawar and Om Prakash were the main star cast of the film.

Mukesh sang a notable song in the film, "Jaane Chale Jaate Hain Kahan". The music of the film was composed by Laxmikant Pyarelal.

Having recently lost his wife, Dinesh Khanna (Sanjay Khan) takes his ailing son to an island. Here, they come across a variety of people who all seem to be after the rich Rani Sahiba's diamond necklace. The film ends with a miraculous recovery for Dinesh's son.

== Plot ==
Dinesh Khanna (Sanjay Khan), discovers his son has brain cancer. The shock kills his wife, Lata (Faryal). Dinesh takes his son, Pappu (Shahid), and his faithful cook Maharaj (Manmohan Krishan) to an island, where they meet several characters who are after Rani Sahiba's (Lalita Pawar) diamond necklace. Dinesh and Pappu also get to know Menaka (Naina Sahu), who starts caring for Pappu. When Pappu has a seizure, a doctor is flown down to the island with the help of one of the kind-hearted crooked characters (Om Prakash). The doctor suggests an operation, but cannot give surety of Pappu surviving the ordeal. A dis-heartened Dinesh refuses the operation for Pappu and takes him to a temple. Pappu recovers miraculously and offers flowers (pushpanjali) at the idol of Shiva as a thanksgiving. Dinesh leaves the island with Pappu and Menaka.

== Cast ==
- Sanjay Khan as Dinesh Khanna
- Naina Sahu as Menaka Sharma
- Kishore Sahu as Jamal Pasha
- Faryal as Lata Khanna
- Premnath as Peter D'Costa
- Om Prakash
- Lalita Pawar as Rani Sahiba
- Manmohan Krishan as Maharaj, the cook
- Master Shahid as Pappu
- Nazir Kashmiri
- Jankidas as tour guide
- Shabnam as Lily
- Lolita Chatterjee
- Brahm Bhardwaj as Dr. Sharma
- Mridula Rani as Mrs. Sharma
- Asrani

== Crew ==
- Producer: Kishore Sahu
- Director: Kishore Sahu
- Associate Director: Rohit Sahu
- Associate producers: Preeti Sahu
- Cinematography: K. H. Kapadia
- Editing: Kantilal B. Shukla
- Art Direction and set decoration: Sant Singh
- Make-up: Mamta Sahu, Prem Kumar
- Special Effects: Parduman
- Music: Laxmikant Pyarelal
- Lyrics: Anand Bakshi
- Song Recordist: Minoo Katrak, D. O. Bhansali
- Choreographer: P. L. Raj

== Location ==
According to the credit roll, the film is set in Kerala. The temples used for the temple sequences are Shri Ekambareswarar Temple, and the Shri Varadaraja Swami Temple, Kanchipuram, Tamil Nadu.

== Soundtrack ==
Composers Laxmikant Pyarelal had Mukesh playback singing a notable song in the film, "Jaane Chale Jaate Hain Kahan" and Manna Dey giving playback for "Sham Dhale Jamuna Kinare". The lyricist was Anand Bakshi and the other singers were Lata Mangeshkar and Asha Bhosle.

=== Songs ===
Song	Singer	Raga
"Jane Chale Jate Hai Kahan"	Mukesh	
"Chham Chham Baje Payal"	Lata Mangeshkar	
"Chunari Dhalakne Lagi"	Lata Mangeshkar	
"Sham Dhale Jamuna Kinare Kinare, Aaja Radha Aaja"	Lata Mangeshkar, Manna Dey	Khamaj
"Bade Haseen Bahane Se"	Asha Bhosle	
