= Raja (1943 film) =

- Directed by: Kishore Sahu
- Written by: Kishore Sahu
- Produced by: Purnima Productions
- Starring: Kishore Sahu; Protima Das Gupta; Rani Bala; Gulab
- Music by: Khan Mastana
- Production company: Purnima Productions
- Release date: 1943
- Country: India
- Language: Hindi

Raja is a 1943 Hindi film directed by Kishore Sahu. It was the first film from the newly established "Purnima Productions". A social satire, it starred Kishore Sahu and Protima Das Gupta in the lead. The music was composed by Khan Mastana, and Kishore Sahu sang the songs picturised on him. The rest of the cast included Ramesh Gupta, Gulab, Moni Chatterjee, Badri Prasad and Rani Bala.

The film performed well at the box-office in centres like Delhi and Bombay. Filmindia editor Baburao Patel stated that Raja "remains a milestone of art and skill in motion pictures".

== Cast ==
- Protima Das Gupta
- Kishore Sahu
- Ranibala
- Moni Chatterjee
- Ramesh Gupta
- Gulab
- Badri Prasad
- Wasker
- Anant Prabhu
- Samson
- Vijay Sahu

== Soundtrack ==
The music director was Khan Mastana, with lyrics by Bhagwati Charan Sharma, Rammurti Chaturvedi and Amritlal Nagar. The singers were Protima Das Gupta, Kishore Sahu, Gulab and Ramesh Gupta.

=== Song list ===
#	Title	Singer
1	"Aankho Ki Yeh Sharab Piye"	Kishore Sahu
2	"Aaye Ban Kar Ullas Abhi"	Protima Dasgupta
3	"Hum Diwano Ki Kya Hasti Hai"	Kishore Sahu
4	"Kahe Nanha Maro Khadi Re"	Gulab, Ramesh Gupta
5	"Nach Nach Kar Thumak Thumak Kar"	Kishore Sahu, Protima Dasgupta
6	"Nikli Pee Ko Pehnane Haar"	Protima Dasgupta
7	"Nirali Duniya Hamari"	Kishore Sahu, Protima Dasgupta
8	"Tere Le Loon Balaiya Hazar"	Protima Dasgupta
