= Bahurani =

Bahurani (transl. Dear daughter-in-law) may refer to these Indian films:

- Bahurani (1940 film), a 1940 Bollywood film
- Bahurani (1963 film), a 1963 Indian Hindi film directed by T. Prakash Rao
- Bahurani (1990 film), a 1990 family-drama Indian Hindi film directed by Manik Chatterjee

== See also ==
- Rani (disambiguation)
