= Mayurpankh =

1954 film

- The poster of the film
- Directed by: Kishore Sahu
- Written by: Kishore Sahu
- Produced by: Kishore Sahu
- Starring: Kishore Sahu; Sumitra Devi
- Music by: Shankar–Jaikishan; Hasrat Jaipuri & Shailendra (lyrics)
- Release date: 1954
- Country: India
- Language: Hindi

Mayurpankh is a 1954 Indian film directed by Kishore Sahu. It was screened in the 1954 Cannes Film Festival, where it competed for the Grand Prize of the Festival. The choreography of the Kathak dance in it was by Shirin Vajifdar, a pioneering Parsi dancer. The film is in colour.

== Plot ==
The film is in part narration by the protagonist and part dialogue. Famous British author Joan Davis goes to India with her boyfriend and encounters Ranjit Singh, a game hunter, in the jungles of India. They fall in love but Joan discovers that Ranjit is married. They meet again in Jaipur at Ranjit's palace, during Ranjit's sister's wedding and Joan meets his wife Shanti. They immediately start liking each other. Ranjit's father is a mining baron and Joan's boyfriend a mining engineer. Both of them strike a deal and Ranjit has to go to England with them. Ranjit's heart wavers and he is undecided as to which love to follow, but he eventually decides.

== Cast ==
- Kishore Sahu as Ranjit Singh
- Sumitra Devi as Shanti
- Odette Ferguson as Joan Davis
- Reginald Jackson as William Griffith
- Jankidas (as Janki Dass)
- Seema Deo
- Ramesh Gupta
- Nirdoshi
- Abbas
- Jagdish Kanwal
- Moni Chatterjee
- Shyamlal (as Shyam)
- Indira Bansal
- Roshan Vajifdar
- Kurshid Vijifdar

== Soundtrack ==
Music was composed by Shankar Jaikishan, lyrics written by Shailendra & Hasrat Jaipuri

#	Title	Singer(s)	Lyricist
1	"Khushiyon Ke Chand Muskuraye"	Lata Mangeshkar	Hasrat Jaipuri
2	"Main To Chaloon Pachhim"	Lata Mangeshkar	Shailendra
3	"Mohabbat Ki Dastan Aaj Suno"	Lata Mangeshkar	Hasrat Jaipuri
4	"Tandana Tandana Tandana"	Lata Mangeshkar	Shailendra
5	"Tu Kyon Mujhko Pukare"	Lata Mangeshkar	Hasrat Jaipuri
6	"Yeh Barkha Bahar"	Asha Bhosle, Lata Mangeshkar	Shailendra
