= Digvijay Stadium =

Sports stadium in Rajnandgaon, India

Coordinates: 21°5′40″N 81°1′14″E

- Interactive map of Digvijay Stadium
- Full name: Digvijay Stadium
- Location: Rajnandgaon, Chhattisgarh, India
- Owner: Digvijay College
- Operator: Digvijay College
- Capacity: 12,000
- Field size: 150 by 150 metres (490 ft × 490 ft)

Construction
- Groundbreaking: 1988
- Opened: 1988
- Cost: ₹54.69 crores

Digvijay Stadium (Hindi: दिग्विजय स्टेडियम) is an international multi-sports stadium in Rajnandgaon, India. The ground is mainly used for organizing matches of football, cricket and other sports.

The stadium was later demolished for major renovations; and then was inaugurated to public on October 4, 2018.

== Match history ==
The stadium has hosted four first-class cricket matches in 1988 when Madhya Pradesh cricket team played against Rajasthan cricket team . The ground hosted three more first-class matches from 1997 to 1999. The stadium also hosted a List A matches when Madhya Pradesh cricket team played against Uttar Pradesh cricket team but since then the stadium has not hosted any cricket matches.

== See also ==
- Rajnandgaon International Hockey Stadium
