= Nadiya Ke Paar (1948 film) =

Nadiya Ke Par
- Poster
- Directed by: Kishore Sahu
- Written by: Kishore Sahu
- Screenplay by: Kishore Sahu
- Story by: Kishore Sahu
- Produced by: Kishore Sahu
- Starring: Dilip Kumar; Kamini Kaushal
- Cinematography: K. H. Kapadia
- Edited by: Kantilal B. Shukla
- Music by: C. Ramchandra
- Distributed by: Filmistan Ltd.
- Release date: 18 December 1948
- Running time: 126 mins
- Country: India
- Language: Hindi

Nadiya Ke Par (lit. 'Across the river') is a 1948 Indian Bollywood film directed by Kishore Sahu. It stars Dilip Kumar & Kamini Kaushal in lead roles. It was the sixth highest grossing Indian film of 1948.

== Cast ==
- Dilip Kumar as Kumar Singh
- Kamini Kaushal as Phoolwa
- Hari Shivdasani as Zamindar Pratap Singh
- Kanta Kumari as Mrs. Pratap Singh
- Ramesh Gupta as Sher Singh
- Maya Banerjee as Chanchal Singh
- David as Thakur Gulab Singh
- Ramayan Tiwari as Diwan
- S. L. Puri as Doctor
- Sushil Sahu as Bala
- Samson as Damri
- Gulab as Heeriya
- Juliete as Chameli
- Anant Prabhu as Chonga

== Music ==
Song	Singer
"Do Char Din Yeh Pyar Se Guzaar Diya Jaye"	Mohammed Rafi, Shamshad Begum
"More Raja Ho, Le Chal Nadiya Ke Par"	Mohammed Rafi, Lalita Deulkar
"Kathwa Ke Naiya"	Lalita Deulkar, C. Ramchandra
"Dil Leke Bhaga"	Lalita Deulkar
"Najariya Mein Aiho, Dagariya Mein Aiho"	Lalita Deulkar, C. Ramchandra
"Maar Gayo Re More Dil Pe Katari"	Shamshad Begum, C. Ramchandra
"O Gori, O Chhori, Kahan Chali Ho, Kahan Chali Ho"	Lata Mangeshkar, C. Ramchandra
"Ankhiyan Milake"	Surinder Kaur
