= Digvijay Das =

Last ruler of Nandgaon State in British India

Mahant Raja Digvijay Das
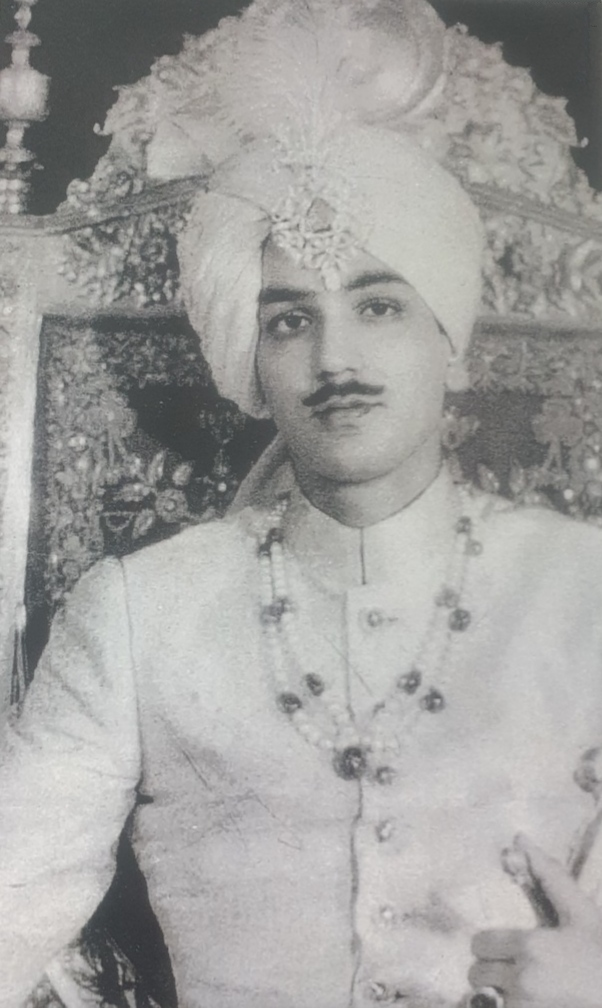
- Raja Digvijay Das, c. 1940

11th Raja of Nandgaon
- Reign: 1940–1947
- Coronation: 18 September 1940
- Predecessor: Mahant Raja Sarveshwar Das
- Born: 25 April 1933
- Died: 22 January 1958
- Spouse: Sanyukta Devi
- Father: Mahant Raja Sarveshwar Das
- Mother: Rani Jyanti Devi
- Religion: Hinduism

Raja Mahant Digvijay Das was the last ruler of the princely state of Nandgaon in the present-day Rajnandgaon district of Chhattisgarh, India.

== Early life ==
Digvijay Das was born on 25 April 1933 to Sarveshvara Das, the ruler of Nandgaon State. He completed his primary education from Rajkumar College, Raipur, then went to London for further education. He travelled around Europe at this time. He succeeded to the throne of Nandgaon State, aged seven, upon the death of his father in 1940.

== Sports ==
Digvijay Das was dedicated to sports. He established the Lalbagh Club and was founder president of the All-India Hockey Association. Digvijay Stadium in Rajnandgaon is named after him.

== Education ==
Digvijay Das was educated person and realised the need of higher education for children. He donated his fort and 1,800 acres (730 ha) of land to his educational department. Digvijay College still operates from the former fort.

== Personal life ==
He married Sanyukta Devi, princess of the former Baria State, in 1953 and died aged 25 on 22 January 1958.
