= Mahant Raja Ghasi Das =

Ruler of Nandgaon State, British India

8th Raja of Nandgaon
- Reign: 1865 - 1883
- Coronation: 1865
- Predecessor: Mahant Ghanaram Das
- Successor: Mahant Raja Balram Das
- Born: c. 1820
- Died: November 1883
- Spouse: Rani Jodh K. Devi
- Religion: Hinduism

Mahant Raja Ghasi Das (c. 1820 - 1883) was the ruler of the princely state of Nandgaon in the present-day Rajnandgaon District of Chhattisgarh, India.

In 1865, the British recognised Mahant Ghasi Das as the ruler of Nandgaon. He was conferred the title of Feudal Chief of Rajnandgaon, and was given Sanad, a right to adoption at a later time.

== Museum ==
Mahant Ghasidas Museum is an archaeological museum, which is also among the ten oldest in India. The two-storey structure was built in 1875 by Ghasi Das, and was renovated by the former queen Jyoti Devi and her son, Digvijai Das in 1953, after the State had ceased to exist. The new building of the museum was inaugurated by the first president of India, Rajendra Prasad.

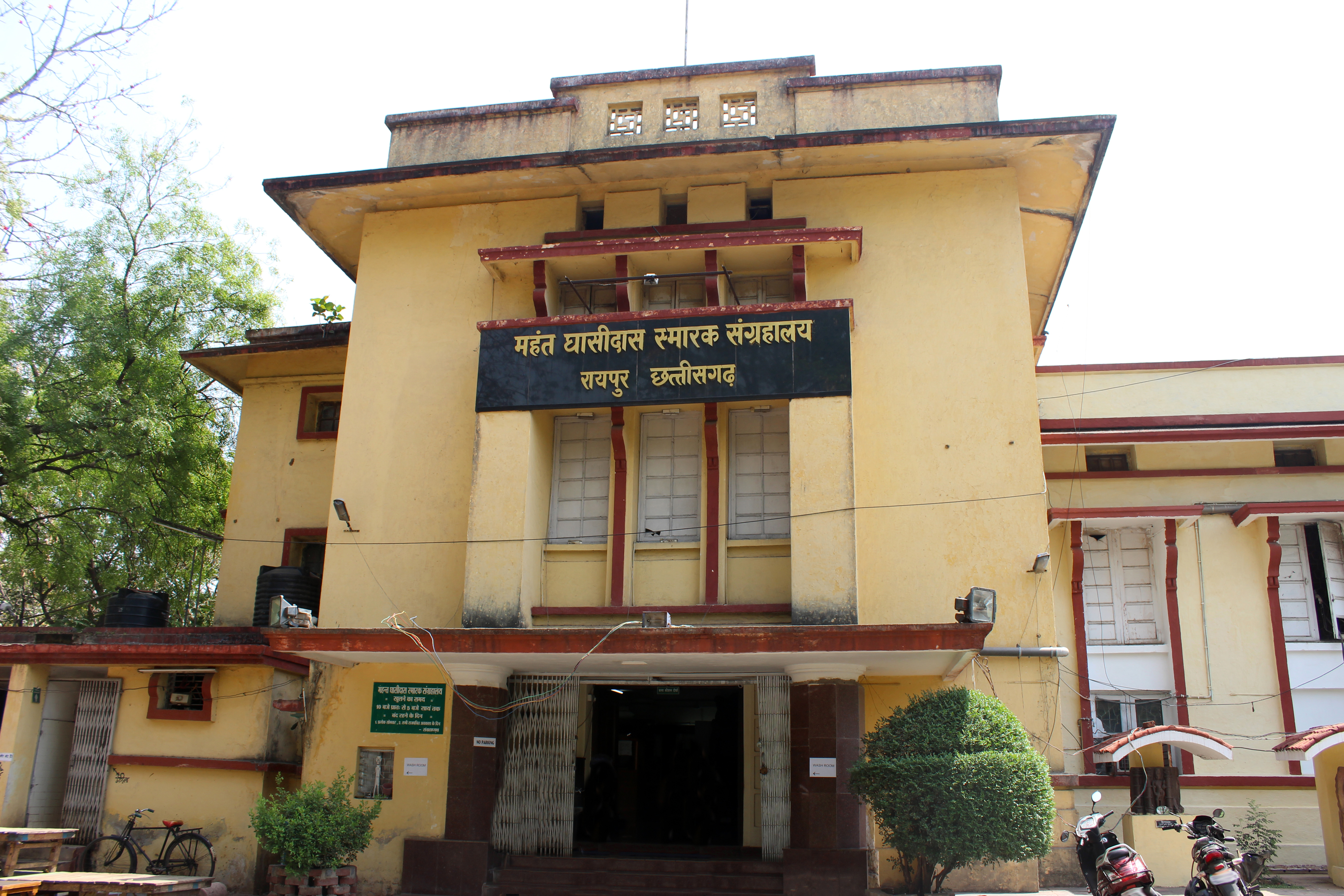
Mahant Ghasi Das Memorial Museum at Raipur.
