= Rajnandgaon International Hockey Stadium =

Hockey stadium in Rajnandgaon, Chhattisgarh, India

- Location: Rajnandgaon, Chhattisgarh, India
- Owner: Government of Chhattisgarh
- Operator: Hockey India
- Capacity: 15,000

Construction
- Built: 2014

Tenant
- n/a

Rajnandgaon International Hockey Stadium is hockey stadium located in Rajnandgaon, Chhattisgarh. The stadium is Chhattisgarh's first international astroturf hockey stadium and second largest after Raipur Stadium. It is spread over an area of nearly 9.5 acres, and built at an estimated cost of 22 crores. It was dedicated to public in January 2014 by state governor Shekhar Dutt and chief minister Raman Singh.

The exhibition match between Governor's Eleven and CM's Eleven comprising international players, including Indian hockey skipper Sardara Singh, Harjot Singh, Affan Yousuf, Lalit Upadhyay was played at the occasion. came up at an estimated cost of `100 crore at Naya Raipur.
