= Nandgaon State =

Princely State of India

- Vassal State of Maratha Empire (1765–1865); Princely State of British India (1865–1948)
- 1765–1948
- Flag

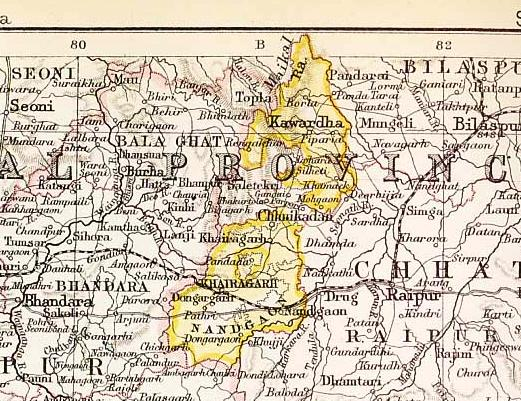
- Nandgaon State in the Imperial Gazetteer of India
- Capital: • Pandadah (1765-1835) • Rajnandgaon (1835-1948)
- Area
  - 1881: 2,344 km^{2} (905 sq mi)
- Population
  - 1881: 164,339
- Historical era: -
  - Established: 1765
  - Accession to the Indian Union: 1948
Preceded by	Succeeded by
Maratha Empire	India
- Today part of: Rajnandgaon (Chhattisgarh)

Nandgaon State (Hindi: नांदगाँव), also known as Raj Nandgaon, was one of the princely states of India during the period of the British Raj. Nandgaon State, in present-day Rajnandgaon District of Chhattisgarh, was the only town of the state and the seat of the ruler's residence. The state was founded by Mahant Prahlad Das Bairagi in 1765 A.D. Nanadgaon State was ruled by Vaishnav Brahmins (Bairagi Brahmins).

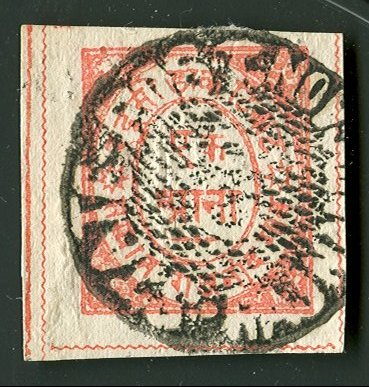
Postage stamp of Nandgaon State

== History ==
The Foundation of the Estate of Nandgaon hails back to Prahlad Das, a Shawl Merchant who in the 18th century had Migrated from the Punjab region. When he settled in Ratanpur the Area was Ruled by the Bhonsle Clan of Marathas.

Prahlad Das Belonged the Bairagi sect whose members practised strict celibacy. The word Bairagi is derived from the Sanskrit Vairagya, Meaning Freedom From Passions. Succession was ensured by Chosen Disciples, Chela, Who became Mahants and Inherited all the possessions of their predecessor. Prahlad Das became wealthy and after his death his disciple Hari Das was given power and influence by the local Maratha ruler who Promoted him as his Rajguru (Spiritual Advisor).

Lineage
Mahant (Raja Bahadur)	Reign
Mahant Prahlad Das	1765-1797
Mahant Hari Das	1797-1812
Mahant Ram Das	1897-1812
Mahant Raghubar Das	1812-1819
Mahant Himanchal Das	1819-1832
Mahant Moujiram Das	1832-1862
Mahant Ghanaram Das	1862-1865
Mahant Raja Ghasi Das	1865-1883
Mahant Raja Balram Das (Raja Bahadur)	1883-1897
Mahant Raja Rajendra Das	1897-1912
Mahant Raja Sarveshwar Das	1913-1940
Mahant Raja Digvijay Das	1940-1947

== See also ==
- Eastern States Agency
- Chhattisgarh Division
- Political integration of India
