= Bahurani (1940 film) =

1940 film

- Directed by: R.S. Junnarkar; Mubarak
- Produced by: Kishore Sahu
- Starring: Kishore Sahu; Rose; Anuradha; Mubarak
- Music by: Rafiqe Ghaznavi
- Production company: Kishore Sahu Productions
- Release date: 1940
- Country: British Raj
- Language: Hindi

Bahurani or Daughter-in-Law is a Bollywood film. It was released in 1940. The film was directed by R.S. Junnarkar and Mubarak for Kishore Sahu Productions. It starred Kishore Sahu, Rose, Anuradha, Mubarak, Madhurika, and Nana Palsikar. The music of the film was composed by Rafiqe Ghaznavi.

== Plot ==
Aruna, a poor village girl born out of wedlock, meets Vijay, a compassionate young zamindar, at her mother’s deathbed. Touched by their suffering and societal rejection, Vijay promises to care for Aruna and brings her into his home. There, she’s treated with love by Didi, Vijay’s elder sister, who is unaware of Aruna’s illegitimacy. Only Diwanji, the loyal family retainer, knows the secret.

Vijay leaves for the city to complete his education, where he meets Mallika Rai, a sophisticated and idealistic college woman. Though their ideals align, he remains emotionally distant. Returning home, he finds Aruna now a grown woman. Moved by her grace and dignity, he proposes marriage, which causes brief family tension before being resolved.

But Aruna’s peace is threatened by Dulin, Didi’s younger brother, who attempts to blackmail her by exposing her birth secret in exchange for her submission. Vijay, unaware of this, brings Mallika back to help with village work, only to find Aruna emotionally crushed.

The story builds toward a dramatic climax as misunderstandings unravel and the truth is revealed, leading to reconciliation and a just, hopeful resolution.
