= Rajnandgaon =

Rajnandgaon Nandgaon
- City
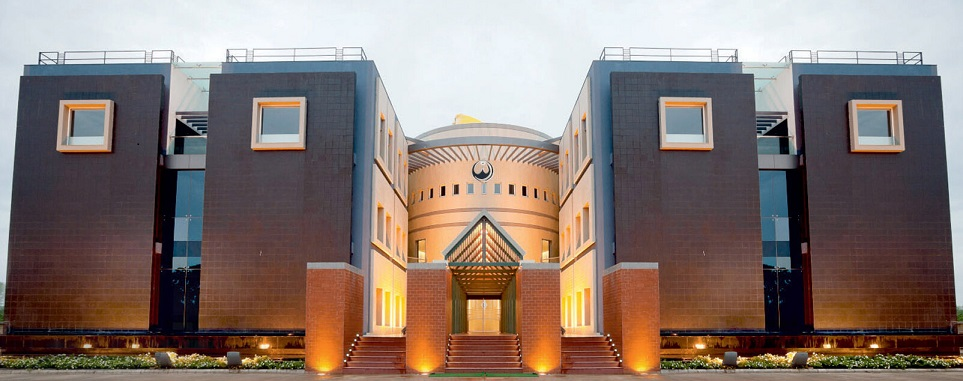
- IB group office building, Rajnandgaon
- Nickname: Sanskardhani
- Location in Chhattisgarh, India
- Coordinates: 21°5′48.566″N 81°1′44.708″E
- Country: India
- State: Chhattisgarh
- District: Rajnandgaon

Government
  - Body: Nagar Nigam Rajnandgaon
  - Mayor: Madhusudhan Yadav (BJP)
  - District Collector: Mr. Doman Singh (IAS).

Area
  - Total: 70 km^{2} (27 sq mi)
- Elevation: 307 m (1,007 ft)

Population (2011)
  - Total: 163,122
  - Rank: 5th in state
  - Density: 2,300/km^{2} (6,000/sq mi)

Languages
  - Official: Hindi, Chhattisgarhi
- Time zone: UTC+5:30 (IST)
- PIN: 491441 (Rajnandgaon)
- Telephone code: 07744
- Vehicle registration: CG-08
- Sex ratio: 1023 ♂/♀
- Website: www.rajnandgaon.nic.in

Rajnandgaon is a city in Rajnandgaon District, in the state of Chhattisgarh, India. As of the 2011 census the population of the city was 163,122. Rajnandgaon district came into existence on 26 January 1973, as a result of the division of Durg district.

== History ==
Originally known as Nandgram, Rajnandgaon State was ruled by Somvanshis, Kalachuris of Tripuri and Marathas. The palaces in the town of Rajnandgaon reveal their own tale of the rulers, their society and culture, and the traditions of those times.

The city was ruled by a dynasty of Vaishnav brahmins who bore the title of Mahant Vaishnav and Gond rajas (chiefs). Succession was by adoption. Its foundation is traced to a religious celibate who came from the Punjab towards the end of the 18th century. From the founder it passed through a succession of chosen disciples until 1879, when the British government recognized the ruler as an hereditary chief and it came to be known as princely state of Raj Nandgaon. The first ruler Mahant Ghasi Das was recognized as a feudal chief by the British government in 1865 and was granted a sanad of adoption. Later the British conferred the title of raja on the ruling mahant.

== Demographics ==
=== Census 2011 ===
As of the 2011 India census, Rajnandgaon had population of 1,537,133 of which male and female were 762,855 and 774,278 respectively. Rajnandgaon had an average literacy rate of 86.97%, male literacy was 91.19%, and female literacy was 82.98%.

=== Census 2001 ===
As of 2001 India census, Rajnandgaon had a population of 143,727. Males constituted 51% of the population and females 49%. Rajnandgaon had an average literacy rate of 73%, higher than the national average of 59.5%: male literacy was 80%, and female literacy was 65%. In Rajnandgaon, 13% of the population was under 6 years of age.

=== Language ===
Chhattisgarhi and Hindi are the main spoken languages in Rajnandgaon. Chhattisgarhi is the native language of this town, along with Hindi. People from different parts of the country live here, so other languages are also spoken by a majority of people. Some people of the city also speak dialects of Hindi such as Rajasthani and Bastari Chhattisgarh.

== Sports ==
Digvijay Stadium is a multi-purpose stadium and is mainly used for organizing matches of football, cricket and other sports. The stadium hosted four first-class matches in 1988 when Madhya Pradesh cricket team played against Rajasthan cricket team.

The International Hockey Stadium is a field hockey stadium with an astroturf surface. It opened in 2014.

== Geography ==
Rajnandgaon is located at 21.10°N 81.03°E in Chhattishgarh. It has an average elevation of 307 metres (1010 feet).

== Climate ==
Climate data for Rajnandgaon (1991–2020, extremes 1980–present)
Month	Jan	Feb	Mar	Apr	May	Jun	Jul	Aug	Sep	Oct	Nov	Dec	Year
Record high °C (°F)	34.1 (93.4)	36.7 (98.1)	43.0 (109.4)	44.5 (112.1)	46.7 (116.1)	45.6 (114.1)	40.4 (104.7)	40.5 (104.9)	35.4 (95.7)	38.0 (100.4)	33.2 (91.8)	31.6 (88.9)	46.7 (116.1)
Mean daily maximum °C (°F)	22.1 (71.8)	27.4 (81.3)	32.3 (90.1)	35.8 (96.4)	38.6 (101.5)	33.7 (92.7)	30.2 (86.4)	28.0 (82.4)	28.5 (83.3)	28.5 (83.3)	25.6 (78.1)	22.7 (72.9)	29.0 (84.2)
Mean daily minimum °C (°F)	12.9 (55.2)	14.8 (58.6)	18.2 (64.8)	22.4 (72.3)	23.7 (74.7)	22.5 (72.5)	22.9 (73.2)	23.2 (73.8)	23.1 (73.6)	21.5 (70.7)	17.1 (62.8)	13.5 (56.3)	19.7 (67.5)
Record low °C (°F)	6.0 (42.8)	6.2 (43.2)	10.2 (50.4)	13.8 (56.8)	18.0 (64.4)	14.0 (57.2)	12.0 (53.6)	17.9 (64.2)	16.0 (60.8)	15.4 (59.7)	10.0 (50.0)	7.4 (45.3)	6.0 (42.8)
Average rainfall mm (inches)	10.4 (0.41)	9.1 (0.36)	16.4 (0.65)	8.4 (0.33)	19.0 (0.75)	120.2 (4.73)	286.6 (11.28)	270.9 (10.67)	143.3 (5.64)	57.0 (2.24)	5.6 (0.22)	6.1 (0.24)	952.9 (37.52)
Average rainy days	1.0	0.6	1.2	0.8	1.6	6.5	10.2	13.9	7.8	2.5	0.5	0.1	46.7
Average relative humidity (%) (at 17:30 IST)	53	41	35	23	31	53	76	81	77	72	59	62	57
Source: India Meteorological Department

== Transport ==
=== Railways ===
Rajnandgaon railway station is on the Howrah-Nagpur-Mumbai line. The station comes under Nagpur Division of SECR. Local trains provide frequent service west to Dongargarh and Nagpur Station, and east to Raipur, while direct express trains are available for all the metros: New Delhi, Mumbai, Kolkata, Chennai, Ahmedabad, Bangalore, and Pune. Rajnandgaon railway station is the fourth busiest railway station of the state after Bilaspur, Raipur and Durg. Railway station consists of four well developed platforms. More than 190 trains passes from city. Direct connections are available for Indore, Bhopal, Jabalpur, Gwalior, Nagpur, Gondia, Wardha, Mumbai, Pune, Nashik, Hapa, Chennai, Trivandrum, Patna etc.

=== Bus ===
Rajnandgaon has two bus stands, Old Bus Stand and New Bus Stand. Bus connectivity is good for transportation to nearby cities and villages, but long-distance bus connectivity is practically non-existent.

MSRTC under Bhandara Division provides bus services to Rajnandgaon from its various depots that interconnect Maharashtra and Chhattisgarh. Bhandara and Rajnandgaon have connected under the same link of NH6.

== See also ==
- Rajnandgaon (Lok Sabha constituency)
- Rajnandgaon (Vidhan Sabha constituency)
- Rajnandgaon ambush
