= Zeelaf =

- Thaat: Asavari
- Type: A Audhav Jaati raga or a Pentatonic melody (containing 5 svaras); A very very rare raga
- Time of day: 06-09
- Arohana: S g m P d S'
- Avarohana: S' d P g P m g S
- Pakad: S g m P d S' S' d P g P m g S
- Chalan: S g m P d S' S' d P g P m g S

Zeelaf or Zilaf is a raga in Hindustani classical music. It is a pentatonic melody (i.e. containing only 5 svaras) is composed of the following svaras : Sa Ga Ma Pa Dha. It is performed very rarely. Zeelaf also employs the subtle GM -> S meend. It is from the Asavari Thaat. But it is played in the Bhairav aang also. Zeelaf has been used by Qawwals and Khayals.

== History ==
Amir Khusru, the father of Qawwali, is said to have created about twelve new melodies or ragas, among which is Zeelaf.
