= Ancient music =

Music developed in literate civilizations

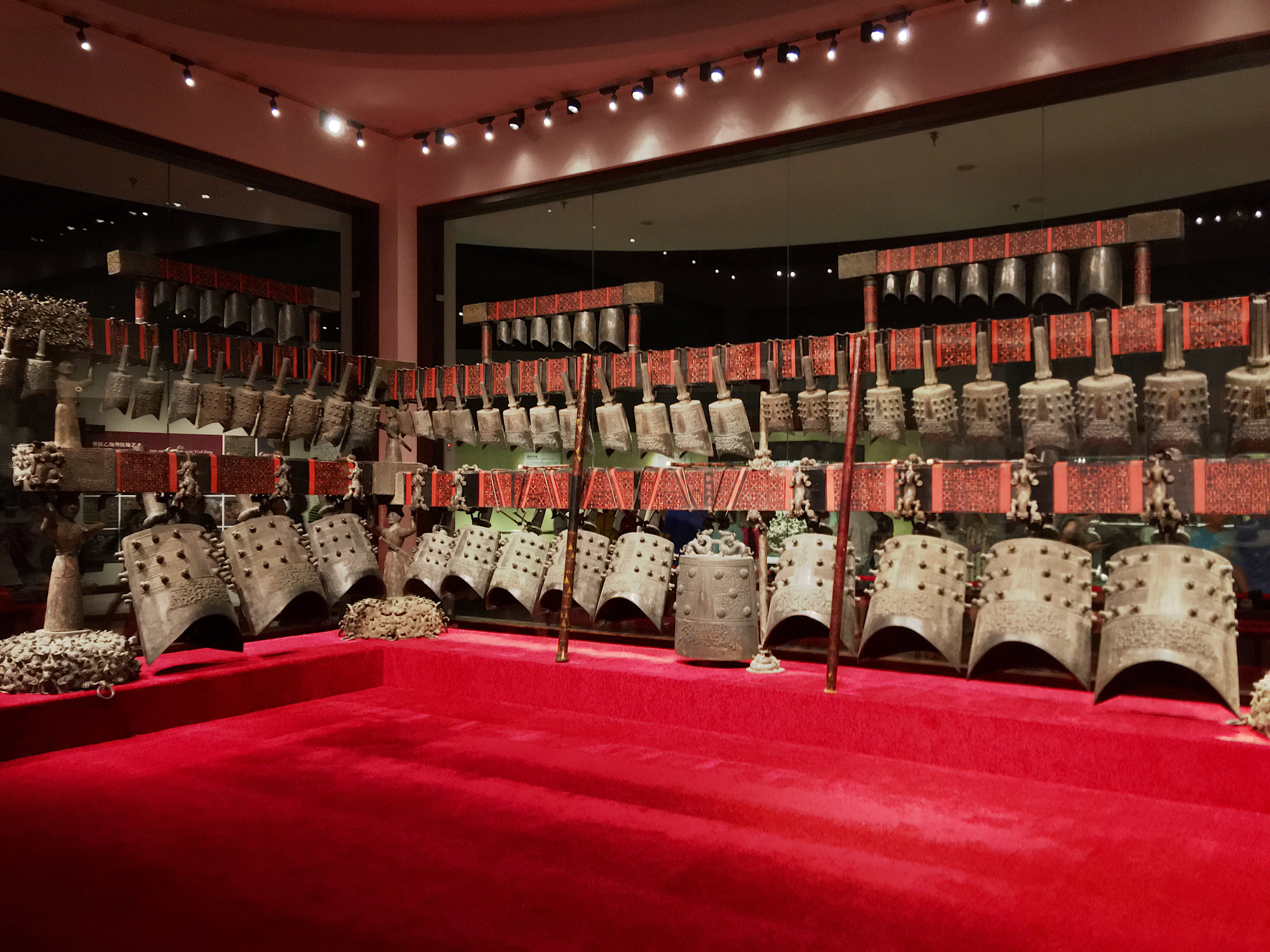
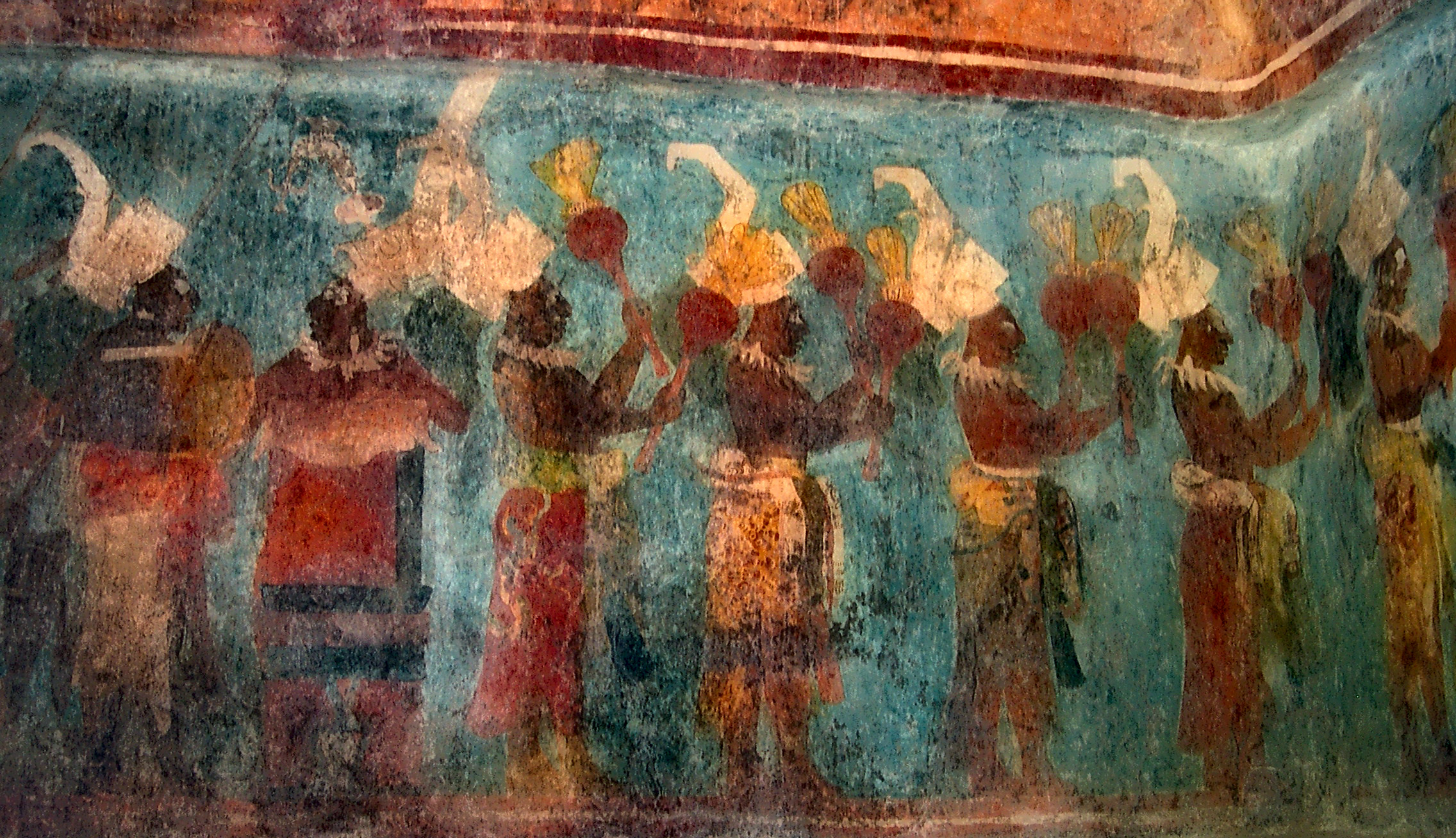
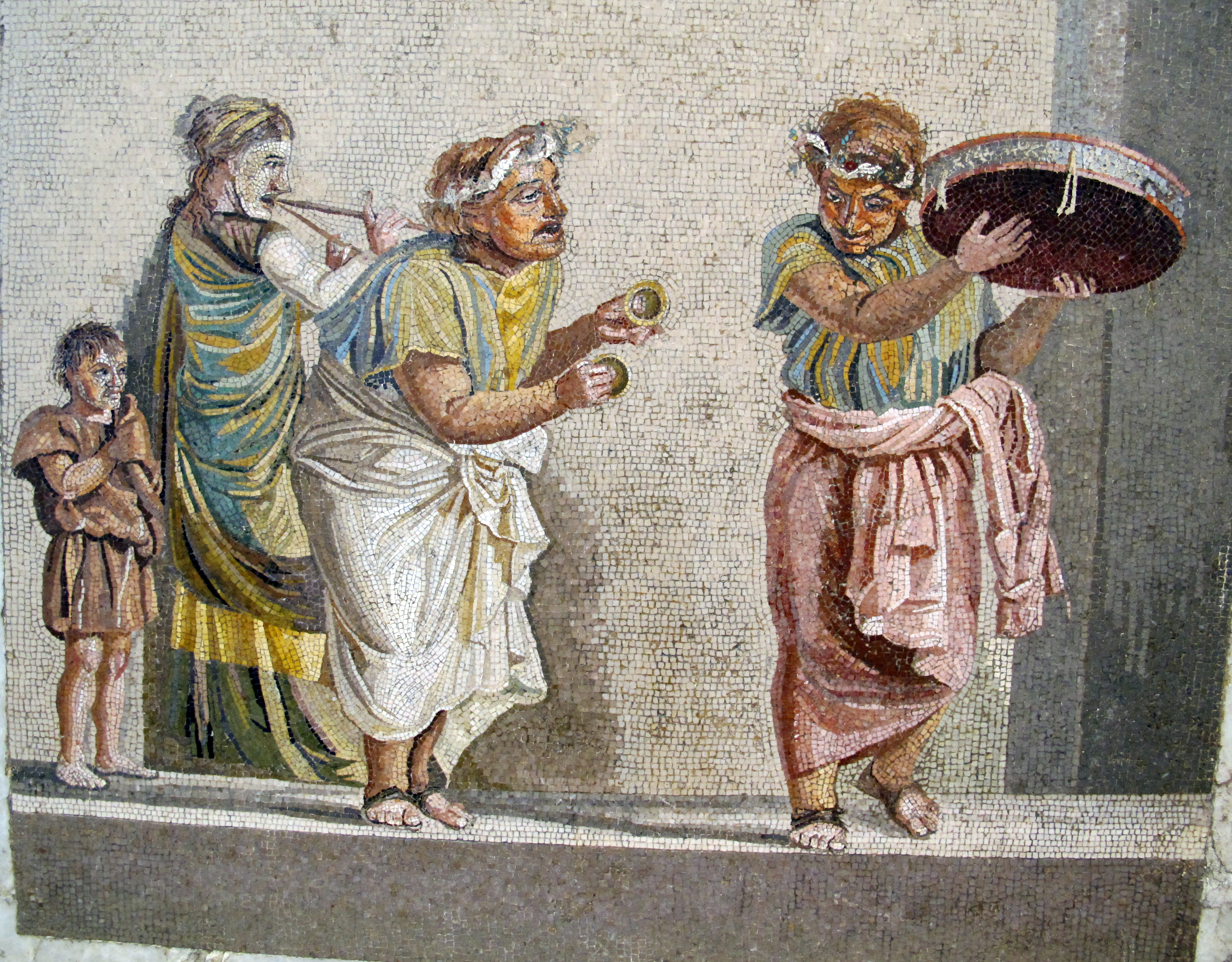
Clockwise, from left:
- The monumental Bianzhong of Marquis Yi of Zeng, c. 5th century BCE, from Hubei
- Musicians from a wall in Bonampak, an Ancient Mayan site
- First-century mosaics from the so-called Villa di Cicerone, Pompeii, in the Museo Archeologico Nazionale, Naples.

Ancient music consists of the musical cultures and practices that developed in the literate civilizations of the ancient world prior to the early medieval period (before approximately 500 CE). It follows the music of prehistoric societies and precedes the emergence of medieval music during the post-classical era.

Major centers of ancient music developed in China, Egypt, Greece, India, Iran/Persia, the Maya civilization, Mesopotamia, and Rome. Though extremely diverse, the music of ancient civilizations is frequently characterized by monophony, improvisation, and the dominance of text in musical settings.

== Overview ==
In prehistoric societies, music was transmitted orally, lacking written record. As writing systems developed and societies became more stratified, particularly in Europe and Asia, phonetic musical notation began to emerge as a way to preserve and standardize musical practices. The more recognizable Western diastematic notation would not develop until during the 9th to 12th centuries CE, with the creation of neumes.

The earliest known example of notated music is the Hurrian Hymn No. 6, dating to the 14th century BCE. The development of notation marked a shift from exclusively oral transmission to a system that enabled the preservation and reinterpretation of musical themes.

== History by regions ==
=== Egypt ===
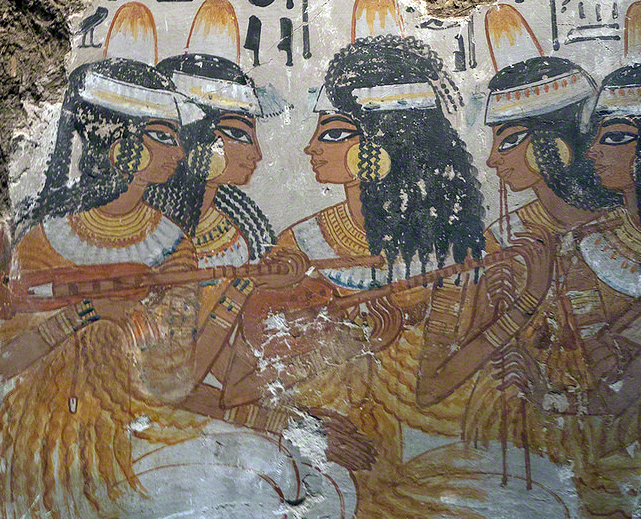
Egyptian lute players. Fresco from the tomb of Nebamun, a nobleman in the 18th Dynasty of Ancient Egypt (c. 1350 BCE).

Music has been an integral part of Egyptian culture since antiquity. The goddess Bat was credited with its invention, although she was later syncretized with the goddess Hathor. According to myth, Osiris used Hathor's music to civilize humanity. Evidence of Egyptian musical instruments dates back to the Predynastic period, Predynastic period, but becomes more substantial in tomb paintings from the Old Kingdom (c. 2575–2134 BCE), in which harps, end-blown flutes (held diagonally), and single and double reed pipes similar to clarinets are depicted.

Percussion instruments and lutes had been added to musical ensembles by the Middle Kingdom. Bronze cymbals from the Roman period (30 BCE–641 CE) have been discovered at a tomb site near Naucratis.

Scholars have attempted to reconstruct the sound of ancient Egyptian instruments by analyzing the hole placement on flutes and reed pipes, and by reconstructing the stringing of lyres, harps, and lutes. However, only the Tutankhamun trumpets and some percussion instruments provide a partial idea of their actual sound.

Most theories about how ancient Egyptian music sounded remain speculative. The sistrum, a ritual rattle used in religious ceremonies, was a prominent percussion instrument in ancient Egypt.

=== Mesopotamia ===
In 1986, Anne Draffkorn Kilmer, professor of ancient history and Mediterranean archaeology at the University of California, Berkeley, published her decipherment of a cuneiform tablet from Nippur (c. 2000 BCE), one of the oldest Sumerian cities. She argued that the tablet contained fragmentary instructions for performing and composing music in harmonies of thirds a diatonic scale.

The musical notation in this tablet is less developed than that of the later cuneiform Hurrian tablets from Ugarit (c. 1250 BCE), also interpreted by Kilmer. Although interpretations vary (at least five rival theories exist), the notation likely refers to lyre strings and tuning systems described in related texts.

These tablets represent the world's earliest known examples of recorded melodies, albeit fragmentary.

==== Harps of Ur ====
In 1929, archaeologist Leonard Woolley discovered fragments of four different stringed instruments while excavating the ancient city-state of Ur in what was Ancient Mesopotamia and what is now Iraq.

The remains, dated to around 2750 BCE, are now housed in museums including the University of Pennsylvania, the British Museum, and in Baghdad. Various reconstructions and restorations of the instruments have been attempted, but many concluded that none have been completely satisfactory.

Though commonly called "harps," these instruments may be more accurately classified as lyres. The most famous, the bull-headed lyre, was held in Baghdad until it was destroyed during the 2003 Iraq War by looters.

===== Hurrian music =====
Among the Hurrian texts from Ugarit in Syria are some of the oldest known instances of written music, dating from c. 1400 BCE and including one complete song.

=== India ===
The Samaveda consists of a collection (samhita) of hymns, portions of hymns, and detached verses, all but 75 taken from the Rigveda, to be sung, using specifically indicated melodies called Samagana. In ancient India, memorization of the sacred Vedas included up to eleven forms of recitation of the same text.

The Natya Shastra is an ancient Indian treatise on the performing arts, encompassing theatre, dance and music. It was written at an uncertain date in classical India (200 BCE–200 CE). The Natya Shastra is based upon the much older Natya Veda which contained 36,000 slokas (proverb/saying).However, no surviving copies of the Natya Veda exist, and some scholars believe it may have been composed by multiple authors over different periods. The most authoritative commentary on the Natya Shastra is Abhinavabharati by Abhinava Gupta. While much of the discussion of music in the Natya Shastra focuses on musical instruments, it also emphasizes several theoretical aspects that remained fundamental to Indian music:

1. Establishment of Shadja as the first, defining note of the scale or grama.
2. Two principles of consonance: The first principle states that there exists a fundamental note in the musical scale which is Avinashi (अविनाशी) and Avilopi (अविलोपी) that is, the note is ever-present and unchanging. The second principle, often treated as law, states that there exists a natural consonance between notes; the best between Shadja and Tar Shadja, the next best between Shadja and Pancham.
3. The Natya Shastra also suggests the notion of musical modes or jatis which are the origin of the notion of the modern melodic structures known as ragas. Their role in invoking emotions are emphasized; thus compositions emphasizing the notes gandhara or rishabha are said to be related to tragedy (karuna rasa) whereas rishabha is to be emphasized for evoking heroism (vIra rasa).

Jatis are elaborated in greater detail in the text Dattilam, composed around the same time as the Natya Shastra.

=== China ===
Most guqin books and tablature written before the twentieth century confirm that this is the origin of the guqin, although now it is viewed as mythology. In Chinese literature, the guqin dates back almost 3,000 years, while examples of the instrument have been found in tombs that date back to about 2,000 years ago. Although the ancient literature states its beginnings, the origin of the guqin has still been a subject of debate over the past few decades.

=== Greece ===
"Music played a very important part in almost every aspect of life for the ancient Greeks." Our knowledge of this music comes from actual music fragments of musical scores, literary references, and remains of ancient musical instruments left behind. Three musical instruments that were commonly found are the kithara, a plucked string instrument; the lyre, also a string instrument; and the aulos, a double-reed instrument. Music (or Mousike) was taught to most Greek men to master a musical instrument competently, sing and perform choral dances. As part of the seven liberal arts curriculum, music was grouped in the quadrivium, which compressed the disciplines regarded as most important. It was also heavily related to astronomy, as Pythagoreanism suggested the metaphysical theory that celestial bodies' movements created music. This is what is known as musica universalis.

=== Rome ===
The music of ancient Rome borrowed heavily from the music of the cultures that were conquered by the empire, including music of Greece, Egypt, and Persia. Music pervaded many areas of Roman life. including the military, entertainment in the Roman theater, religious ceremonies and practices, and almost all public/civic occasions.

The philosopher-theorist Boethius translated into Latin and anthologized a number of Greek treatises, including some on music. His work The Principles of Music (better-known under the title De institutione musica) divided music into three types: Musica mundana (music of the universe), musica humana (music of human beings), and musica instrumentalis (instrumental music).
