= Saptak =

Seven-note series in Indian classical music

Saptak means "gamut" or "the series of seven notes". It denotes the set of swaras i.e. Shadja (Sa), Rishabha (Ri), Gāndhāra (Ga), Madhyama (Ma), Panchama (Pa), Dhaivat (Dha), Nishada (Ni), Shadja (Sa) which comprise a musical scale in Indian classical music. In Sanskrit, saptak literally means "containing seven" and is derived from the Sanskrit word Sapta which means "seven". The Saptak comprises the Sapta Svaras, i.e. the seven svaras or the seven notes of classical music.

The basic saptak is called the Madhya Saptak (Devanagari: मध्य सप्तक). For notes with lower frequencies, the artist may use the Mandra Saptak (Devanagari: मंद्र सप्तक)', which is an octave lower than the Madhya Saptak. For notes with higher frequencies, the Taar Saptak (Devanagari: तार सप्तक), which is an octave above the Madhya Saptak, is used.

The usual scale of Indian music spans from Sa in the Madhya Saptak to Sa in the higher, Taar Saptak. This inclusion of the first note of the higher saptak makes eight notes instead of the seven in each Saptak.

Generally, a raga involves notes from three saptaks. The notes in the lower saptak are denoted by an apostrophe before the note representation (or a dot below the note representation) and the notes in the upper saptak are denoted by an apostrophe after the note representation (or a dot above the note representation).

For example:

- Mandra Saptak : Ṣ or Ş or 'S
- Madhya Saptak : S
- Taar Saptak : Ṡ or Ŝ or S'

Talking about frequencies of the svaras, the frequencies change for all svaras i.e. Sa 240 Hz, Re 270 Hz, Komal Ga 288 Hz, Ma 320 Hz, Pa 360 Hz, Dha 405 Hz, and Komal Ni 432 Hz. Consequently, the Sa after the Ni of 432 Hz has a frequency of 480 Hz i.e. double the Lower saptak Sa, as do all 6 other svaras. Considering the Sa of the Madhya Saptak, the frequencies of the other svaras would be,

                  Sa      Re       Ga     Ma      Pa      Dha     Ni
  Mandra Saptak: 120 Hz, 135 Hz, 144 Hz, 160 Hz, 180 Hz, 202.5 Hz, 216 Hz.}
  Madhya Saptak: 240 Hz, 270 Hz, 288 Hz, 320 Hz, 360 Hz, 405 Hz, 432 Hz.} 
   Taar   Saptak: 480 Hz, 540 Hz, 576 Hz, 640 Hz, 720 Hz, 810 Hz, 864 Hz.}
