= Rishabha (svara) =

Second svara in Indian classical music

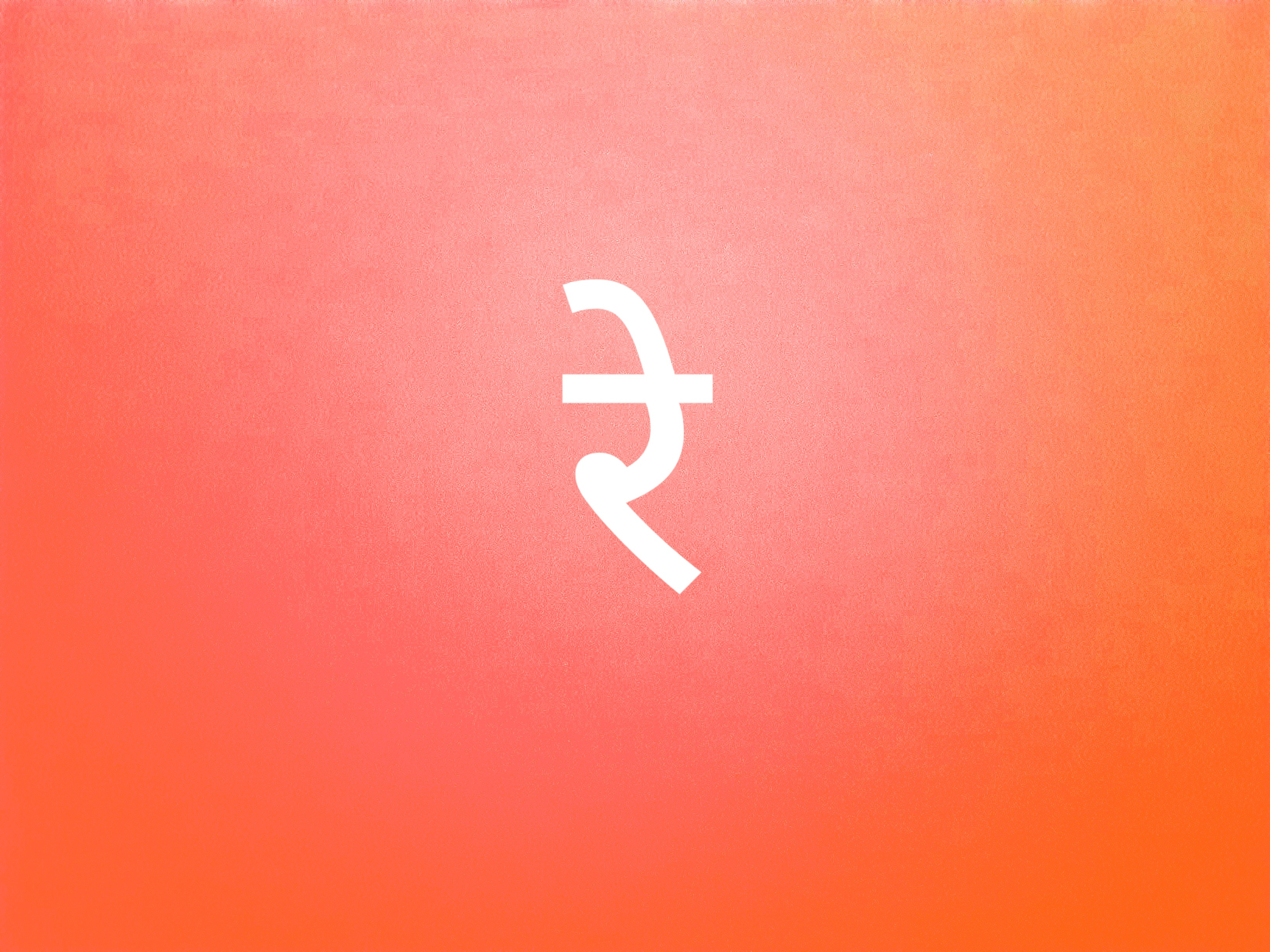
Rishabh (Re)

Rishabha (Sanskrit: ऋषभ, romanized: Ṛṣabha [ɽ̩̊ʂɐbʱɐ]) is the second of the seven svaras in Hindustani and Carnatic music. Rishabha is the long form of the syllable रे (Re).

== Detail ==
Rishabha holds significant importance in Indian classical music:

- Rishabha is the second svara in an octave or Saptak and follows "Sa" (Shadja) as its immediate successor.
- The svara of Rishabha is Komal and Shuddha.
- It is said that Shadja is the basic svara from which all the other 6 svaras are produced. When we break the word Shadja then we get, Shad and Ja. It means that Shad is 6 and ja is 'giving birth' in Marathi. So basically the translation is :

 The literal translation is: षड् - 6, ज - जन्म (giving birth). Therefore, it collectively means giving birth to the other six notes of music; thus, the svara Re is derived from Shadja.

- The frequency of Rishabha is 270 Hz. The frequencies of the seven svaras are as follows: Sa 240 Hz, Re 270 Hz, Ga 300 Hz, Ma 320 Hz, Pa 360 Hz, Dha 400 Hz, Ni 450 Hz, and Sa 480 Hz (Taar Saptak)........ (and so on). 'Sa' can have any frequency but then the frequencies of other svaras increase or decrease with a common ratio or difference.

Consequently, the Re after the Sa of 480 Hz (Taar Saptak) has a frequency of 540 Hz, i.e., double the frequency of the lower octave Re.

- There are three shrutis of Rishabha. Previously, the main shruti not only for Re but for all the other svaras was on the last shruti, but it is now considered to be on the first shruti. For example, if these are the three shrutis of Re:

                    Previously this was the position of the main Shruti of Re.
                    ^ 
             1   2  3
             ^
             But now this position has become the main Shruti of Re.

- All other svaras except Shadja (Sa) and Pancham (Pa) can be komal or tivra svaras, whereas Sa and Pa are always shuddha svaras. Consequently, Sa and Pa are called achal svaras because they do not move from their original positions. Svaras Re, Ga, Ma, Dha, and Ni are called chal svaras because they move from their original positions.

    Sa, Re, Ga, Ma, Pa, Dha, Ni - Shuddha Svaras
   
    Re, Ga, Dha, Ni - Komal Svaras 
  
    Ma - Tivra Svaras

- Ragas from Bhairav Thaat, Poorvi Thaat, Marwa Thaat, Bhairavi Thaat and Todi Thaat have Komal Rishabha, rest of the thaats have Shuddha Rishabha.
- Ragas where Re is the Vadi svara - Raga Brindabani Sarang, etc. Ragas where Re is the Samvadi svara - Raga Bhairav, etc.
- In traditional lore, Re is associated with the Rishimunis (sages). According to this tradition, the three main deities—Brahma, Vishnu, and Shiva—were created first as Sakar Brahma (represented by Sa), and these deities subsequently created the Rishimunis (represented by Re). The syllable Re serves as an acronym for Rishimuni to highlight its significance.
- Rishabha is said to be sourced from the lowing of a bull.
- Rishabha is associated with the planet Mars.
- Rishabha is the name of the earliest and first Tirthankara of Jainism.
- Rishabha is associated with the color red.

== Difference in pronouncing ==
While Rishabha is the long form of the syllables रे and री, it is shortened to Re or Ri for simplicity during singing. This variation reflects differing pronunciations between Hindustani classical music, which uses Re, and Carnatic classical music, which uses Ri. In Hindustani classical music, Rishabha is pronounced as Re, while in Carnatic classical music, it is pronounced as Ri.

So a Hindustani classical singer will sing the 7 svaras as : Sa Re Ga Ma Pa Dha Ni Sa.

While a Carnatic classical singer will sing these svaras as: Sa Ri Ga Ma Pa Dha Ni Sa.

== See also ==
- List of Ragas in Hindustani classical music
- Svara
- Shadja (Sa)
- Gandhara (Ga)
- Madhyam (Ma)
- Pancham (Pa)
- Dhaivat (Dha)
- Nishada (Ni)
