= Gandhara (svara) =

Third svara in Indian classical music

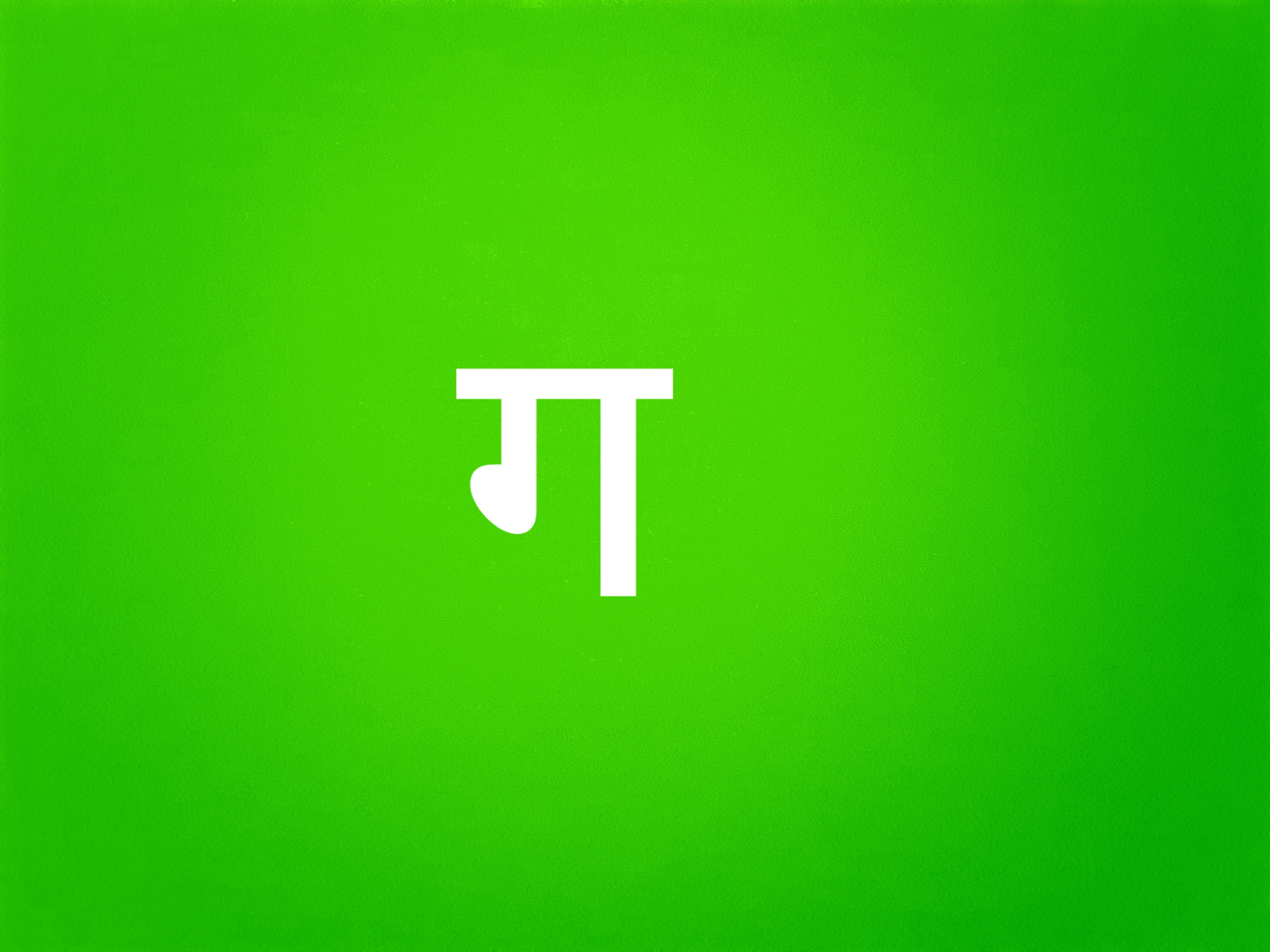
Gandhara (Ga)

Gandhara (Sanskrit: गान्धार, romanized: Gāndhāra [ɡaːn̪d̪ʱaːɾɐ]) is the third svara in Hindustani and Carnatic music. Gandhara is the long form of the syllable ग (Ga).

== Details ==
In Indian classical music, Gandhara is the third svara in an octave or Saptak. It is the immediate next svara of Rishabh (Re). The svara of Gandhara is Komal and Shuddha. It is said that Shadja is the basic svara from which all the other 6 svaras are produced. The word Shadja is composed of the words "shad" and "ja". Here, shad means six and ja means "giving" birth' in Marathi. As such, this roughly translates as "giving birth to the other six notes."

In turn, the svara Ga is formed from Shadja. The frequency of Gandhara is 300 Hz. The frequencies of the 7 svaras are: Sa 240 Hz, Re 270 Hz, Ga 300 Hz, Ma 320 Hz, Pa 360 Hz, Dha 400 Hz, and Ni 450 Hz, Sa 480 Hz (Taar Saptak), and so on. Consequently, the Ga after the Re of 540 Hz (Taar Saptak) has a frequency of 600 Hz, i.e., the double of the lower octave Ga.

Gandhara has 2 Shruti. Previously the main Shruti, not only for Ga but for all svaras, was the last Shruti. It later became considered to be the 1st Shurti.

All the other svaras except Shadja (Sa) and Pancham (Pa) can be komal or tivra svaras, but Sa and Pa are always Shuddha svaras. And hence svaras Sa and Pa are called Achal svaras , since these svaras don't move from their original position. Svaras Ra, Ga, Ma, Dha, Ni are called Chal svaras, since these svaras move from their original position.

Ragas from Kafi Thaat, Asavari Thaat, Todi Thaat and Bhairavi Thaat have Komal Gandhara, while the rest of the thaats have Shuddha Gandhara. Ragas where Ga is the Vadi svara - Raga Kafi (raga), raga Bageshri, raga Bhoopali etc. Ragas where Ga is the Samvadi svara - Raga Sohni, etc.

Hypothetically speaking, Ga is said to be the Gandharvas, in that the three main gods, Brahma, Vishnu, and Shiva, were first created, i.e. Sakar Bhrama (Sa), and then these three gods created Rishimuni, i.e. Re, and then Gandharvas were created for singing. Ga is the acronym of Gandharvas for showing its importance.

Gandhara is said to be sourced from the bleating of a goat. Gandhara is associated with the planet Sun. Gandhara is associated with the colour gold.

== See also ==
- List of Ragas in Hindustani classical music
- Svara
- Shadja (Sa)
- Rishabh (Re)
- Madhyam (Ma)
- Pancham (Pa)
- Dhaivat (Dha)
- Nishada (Ni)
