= Mukund Lath =

Indian scholar (1937–2020)

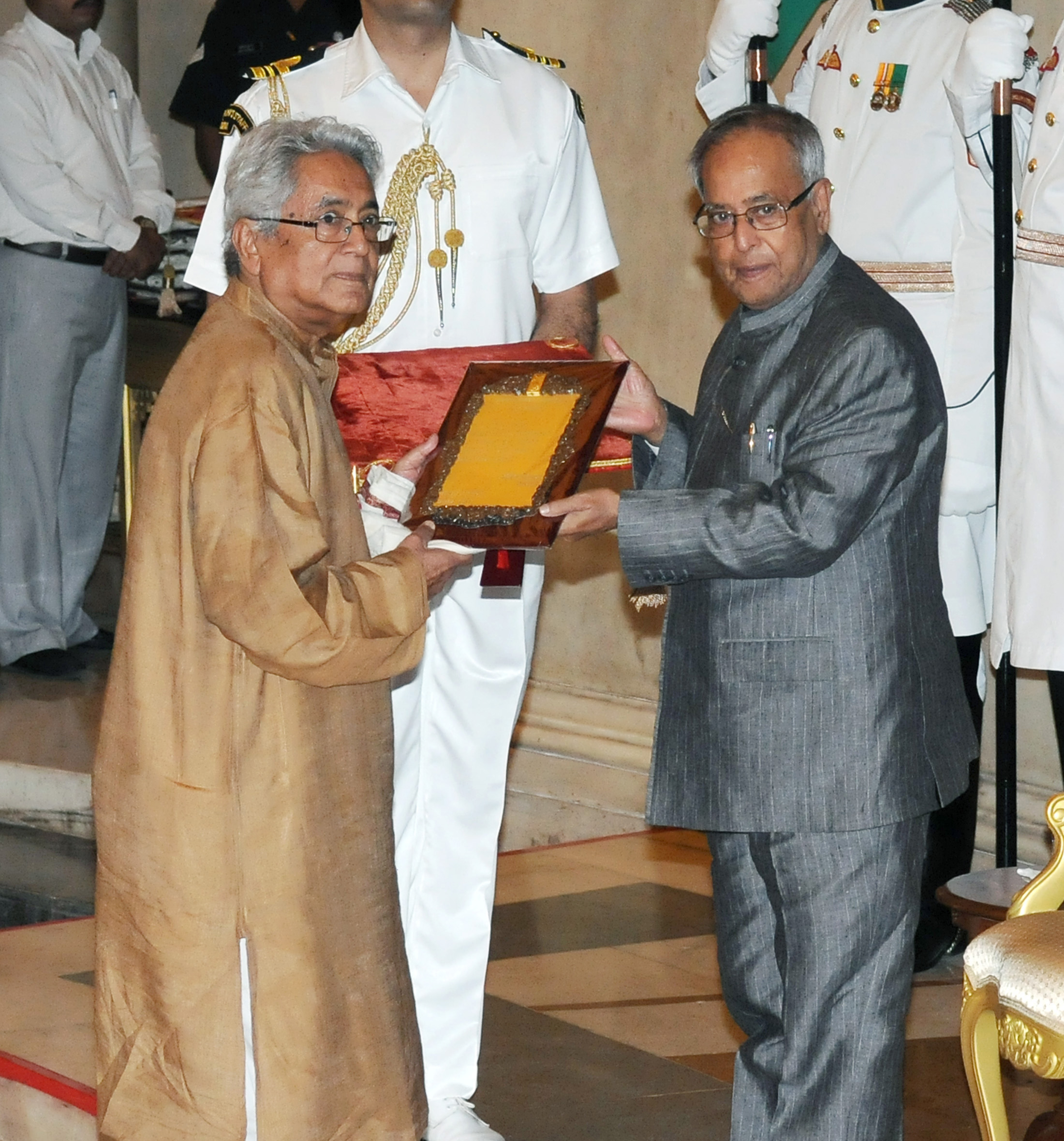
- Pranab Mukherjee presenting the Sangeet Natak Akademi Fellowship to Shri Mukund Lath, at the investiture ceremony of the Sangeet Natak Akademi Fellowships and Sangeet Natak Akademi Awards-2011, at Rashtrapati Bhavan
- Born: 9 October 1937; Kolkata, West Bengal, India
- Died: 6 August 2020 (aged 82); Jaipur, Rajasthan, India
- Resting place: Bombay
- Occupations: Cultural historian, scholar
- Years active: 1966–2020
- Awards: Padma Shri; Sangeet Natak Akademi Fellowship; Sangeet Natak Akademi Award; Shankar Puraskar; Naresh Mehta Vangmaya Puraskar
- Website: Official web site

Mukund Lath (9 October 1937 – 6 August 2020) was an Indian scholar and cultural historian, known for his writings on music, dance, aesthetics and culture of India. He was honored by the Government of India, in 2010, with the fourth highest Indian civilian award of Padma Shri.

== Early life and education ==
Mukund Lath was born on 9 October 1937 in Kolkata in the Indian state of West Bengal. After completing his senior cambridge, Lath graduated (BA Hons) in English literature from the University of Delhi. His master's degree (MA) was in Sanskrit literature from Jadavpur University in 1965. Later he enrolled at Institute for Comparative Music Studies and Documentation, West Berlin for research on Dattilam, an ancient treatise on the music of India. Subsequently, he returned to India and secured a doctoral degree (PhD) on Dattilam from Delhi University in 1976. He also had training in classical music, during a period from 1966 to 1968, under Pandit Maniram and Ramesh Chakravarti and later, had training in the genre of Khayal Mewat Gharana under the guidance of Pandit Jasraj, whom he has accompanied on many concert tours.

== Career ==
Lath started his career at the University of Rajasthan by joining their Department of History and Indian Culture in 1973 where he worked till his retirement in 1997.

Mukund Lath has authored several books and articles. Some of his notable works are:

- A Study of Dattilam - Research work on Dattilam
- Transformation as Creation - A study on Indian culture
- Hindi Padavali of Namdev - A critical study of the texts of Namdev, Indian poet-saint
- The Ardhakathanaka - Half A Tale - A study of the autobiography of a Jain merchant of the 17th century
- Bhakthi, A Contemporary Discussion - A philosophical interpretation of Indian Bhakti tradition

Lath's works have been subjected to critical studies and many articles have been published in his honour. He has also published two translations of ancient Sanskrit and Prakrit poems into Hindi.

Lath has taught as a visiting faculty at many universities around the world such as Oxford University, Katholieke Universiteit Leuven, Belgium, University of Bamberg, Germany and Hebrew University of Jerusalem. He has also delivered keynote addresses and lectures at many conferences and seminars and was a member of the Project of History of Indian Science, Philosophy and Culture, a Government of India initiative. Mukund Lath is credited with evolving a new approach to cultural history and is known to have written on the history behind the musical instrument Tanpura and the relevance of Sarangi in Indian concerts.

== Awards and recognitions ==
Mukund Lath received Shankar Puraskar from K. K. Birla Foundation in 2000, for his work, Sangeet evam Chintan (Music and Thoughts). He received another award, Naresh Mehta Vangmaya Puraskar, for the same work, from Madhya Pradesh Rashtrabhasha Prachar Samiti in 2003. In 2008, he received the Sangeet Natak Akademi Award. Two years later, in 2010, the Government of India awarded him the civilian honour of Padma Shri. The Sangeet Natak Akademi honoured him again, in 2012, with their Fellowship of Sangeet Natak Akademi Ratna.

== See also ==
- Dattilam
- Namdev
