= Dhaivata (svara) =

Sixth svara in Indian classical music

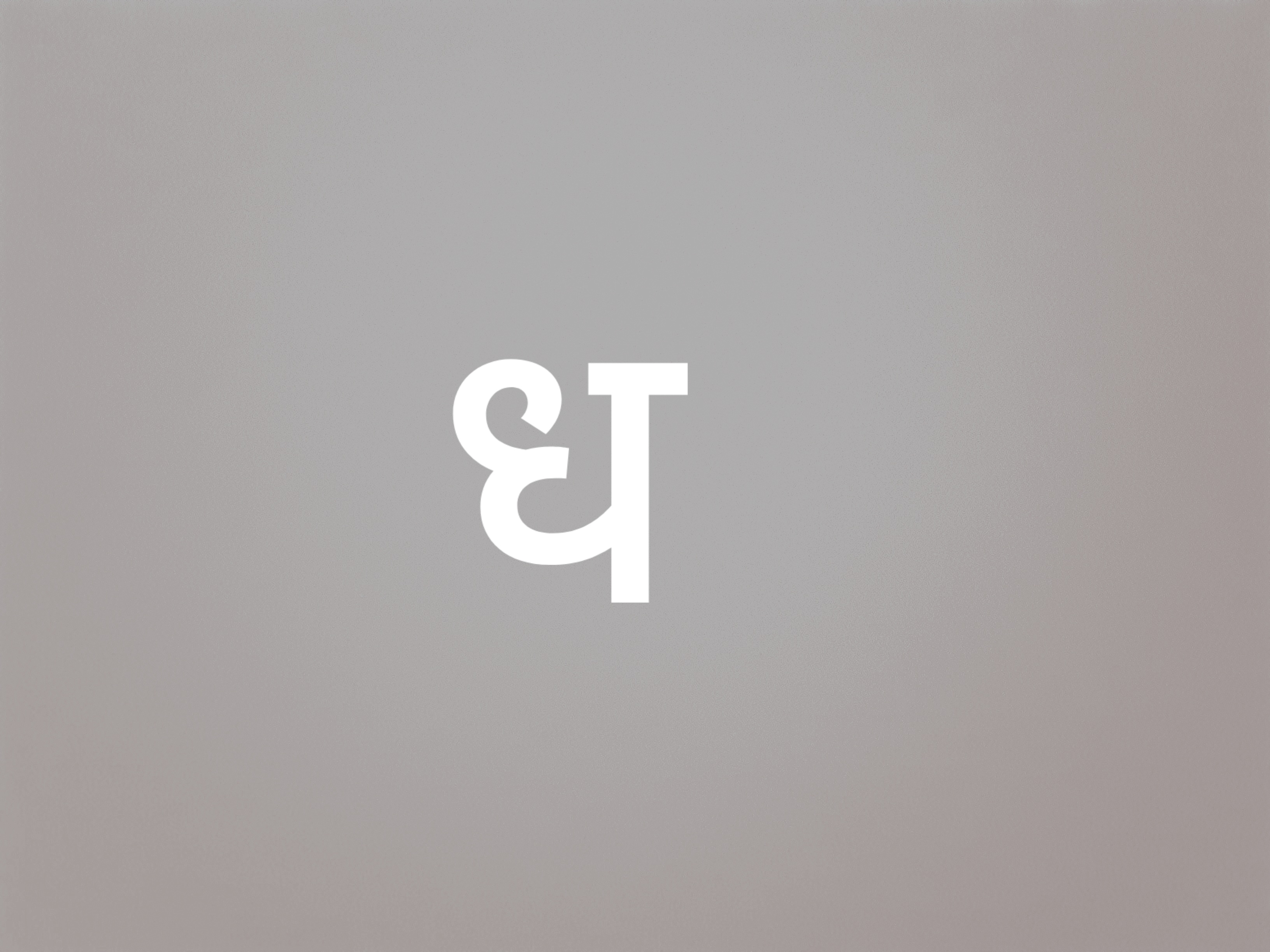
Dhaivata (Dha)

Dhaivata (Sanskrit: धैवत, romanized: Dhaivata [d̪ʱaɪ̯ʋɐt̪ɐ]) is the sixth and penultimate svara of Hindustani and Carnatic music. Dhaivata is the long form of the syllable ध (Dha).

== Pitch ==
- Dhaivata is the sixth svara in a saptak (octave).
- Dhaivata is the immediate next svara of Pancham (Pa).

== Culture ==
- The svara of Dhaivata is Komal and Shuddha.
- Shadja is the basic svara from which the other six svaras derive. The word Shadja breas into Shad And Ja. Shad is 6 and ja is 'giving birth' in Marathi. The translation is :

 षड् - 6, ज -जन्म
 Therefore, it collectively means giving birth to the other 6 notes of the music.

So the svara Dha is formed from Shadja. The frequency of Dhaivata is 400 Hz. Sa 240Hz, Re 270 Hz, Ga 300 Hz, Ma 320 Hz, Pa 360 Hz, Dha 400 Hz, and Ni 450 Hz, Sa 480 Hz (Taar Saptak) etc. Consequently, the Dha after the Pa of 320 Hz (Taar Saptak) has a frequency of 800 Hz i.e. the double of the Lower octave Dha. There are 3 Shruti of Dhaivata. Previously the main Shruti, not only for Re but for all the other svaras, was on the last Shruti but now it is considered to be on the 1st Shrurti. For example, if these are the 3 Shruti's of Re then,

                    Previously this was the position of the main Shruti of Re.
                    ^ 
             1   2  3
             ^
             This position has become the main Shruti of Re.

The other svaras except Shadja (Sa) and Pancham (Pa) can be Komal or Tivra svaras but Sa and Pa are always Shuddha. Hence svaras Sa and Pa are Achal Svaras, since they do not move from their original position. Ra, Ga, Ma, Dha, Ni are called Chal Svaras, since they do move.

    Sa, Re, Ga, Ma, Pa, Dha, Ni - Shuddha Svaras
   
    Re, Ga, Dha, Ni - Komal Svaras 
  
    Ma - Tivra Svaras

- Ragas from Bhairav Thaat, Poorvi Thaat, Asavari Thaat, Bhairavi Thaat and Todi Thaat have Komal Dhaivata, rest of the thaats have Shuddha Dhaivata.
- Ragas where Dha is the Vadi svara include Raga Bhairav. Ragas where Dha is the Samvadi svara include Raga Kalingda.
- Dhaivata is said to be sourced from the neighing of the horse.
- Dhaivata is associated with the planet Jupiter.
- Dhaivata is associated with the color yellow.

== See also ==
- List of Ragas in Hindustani classical music
- Svara
- Shadja (Sa)
- Rishabha (Re)
- Gandhara (Ga)
- Madhyam (Ma)
- Pancham (Pa)
- Nishada (Ni)
