= Nishada (svara) =

Seventh and last svara in Indian classical music

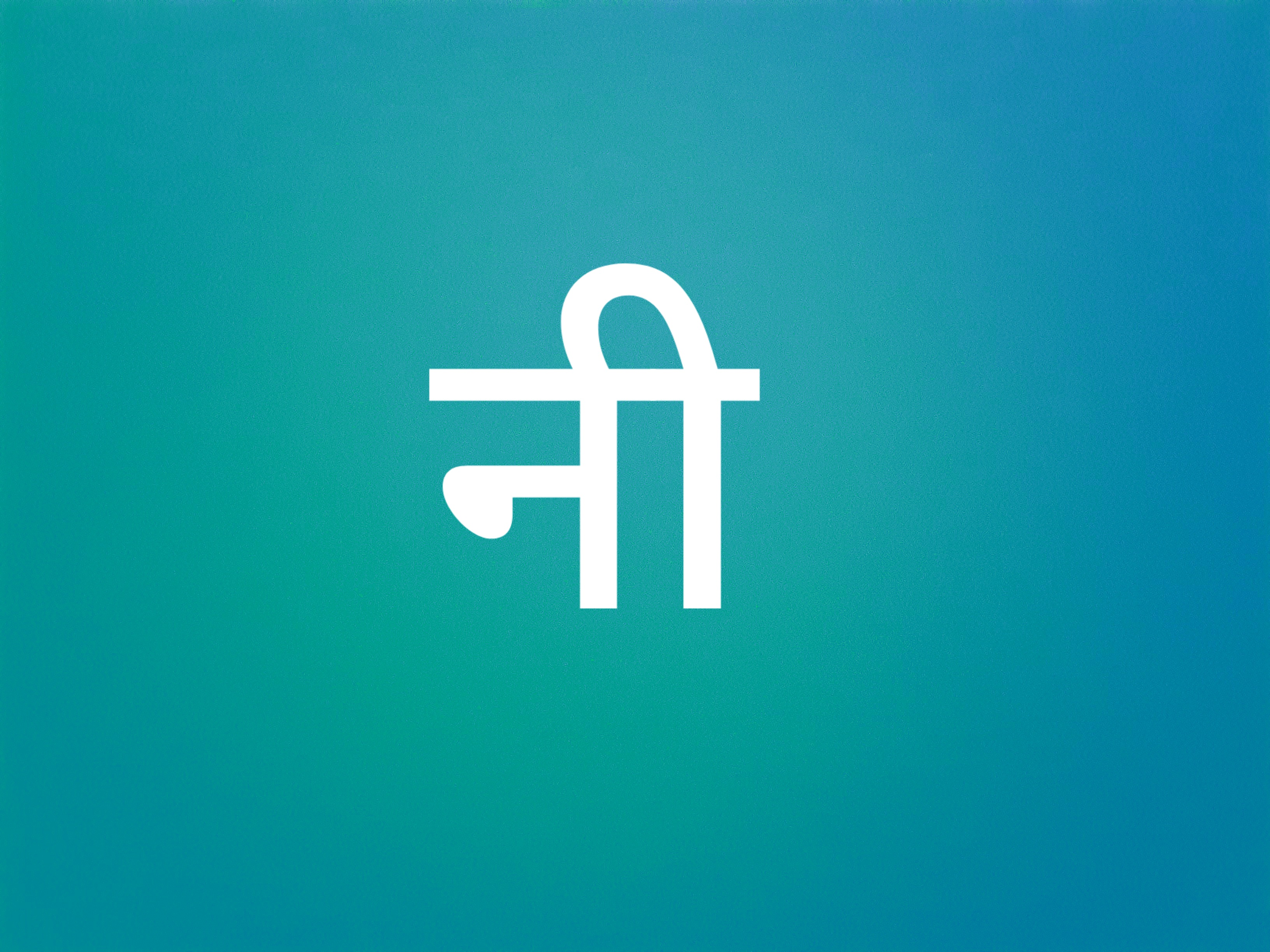
Nishada (Ni)

Nishada (Sanskrit: निषाद, romanized: Niṣāda [nɪʂäːd̪ɐ]) is the seventh and last svara in Hindustani music and Carnatic music. Nishada is the long form of the syllable नी (Ni).

== Details ==
The following is the information about Nishada and its importance in Indian classical music :

- Nishada is the seventh svara in an octave or Saptak.
- Nishada immediately follows Dhaivat (Dha).
- The svara of Nishada is Komal and Shuddha.
- It is said that Shadja is the basic svara from which all the other 6 svaras are produced. Breaking down the word Shadja yields Shad and Ja. It means that Shad is 6 and ja is 'giving birth' in Marathi. the literal translation is :

 षड् - 6, ज -जन्म . Therefore, it collectively means giving birth to the other six notes of the music.

So the svara Ni is formed from Shadja.

- The frequency of Nishada is 450 Hz. The frequencies of the seven svaras are also given below: Sa 240 Hz, Re 270 Hz, Ga 300 Hz, Ma 320 Hz, Pa 360 Hz, Dha 400 Hz, and Ni 450 Hz, Sa 480 Hz (Taar Saptak) ........ (and so on).

Consequently, the Ni after the Dha of 400 Hz has a frequency of 450 Hz, which doubles to 900 Hz in the higher octave (Taar Saptak).

- There are two shrutis of Nishada. Previously, the primary shruti for all svaras was placed on the final position, but it is now considered to be on the first.

For example, if these are the two shrutis of Ni, then:

                 Previously this was the position of the main Shruti of Ni.
                 ^ 
             1   2
             ^
             But now this position has become the main Shruti of Ni.

- All the other svaras except Shadja (Sa) and Pancham (Pa) can be Komal or Tivra svaras but Sa and Pa are always Shuddha svaras. And hence svaras Sa and Pa are called Achal Svaras, since these svaras don't move from their original position. Svaras Ra, Ga, Ma, Dha, Ni are called Chal Svaras, since these svaras move from their original position.

    Sa, Re, Ga, Ma, Pa, Dha, Ni - Shuddha Svaras
   
    Re, Ga, Dha, Ni - Komal Svaras 
  
    Ma - Tivra Svaras

- Ragas from Khamaj Thaat, Kafi Thaat, Asavari Thaat and Bhairavi Thaat have Komal Nishada, the rest of the thaats have Shuddha Nishada.
- Ragas where Ni is the Vadi svara include Raga Jaunpuri and Raga Tilang; ragas where Ni is the Samvadi svara include Raga Purvi and Raga Yaman.
- Hypothetically, Ni is said to represent Nirakar Brahma (the formless divine). According to this tradition, the three main deities Brahma, Vishnu, and Shiva were created first as Sakar Brahma (Sa). These three deities then created the Rishimuni (Re), followed by the Gandharvas for singing, and Lord Indra (Mahipal). Once the king was established, the Praja (common citizens) were created. As the people required a duty, Dharma (religion) was established, ultimately manifesting the formless aspect of the divine, Nirakar Brahma (Ni).
- Nishada is said to be sourced from the trumpeting of the elephant.
- Nishada is associated with the planet Venus.
- Nishada is associated with Multi colours.

== See also ==
- List of Ragas in Hindustani classical music
- Svara
- Shadja (Sa)
- Rishabh (Re)
- Gandhara (Ga)
- Madhyam (Ma)
- Pancham (Pa)
- Dhaivat (Dha)
