= Sarpada =

- Thaat: Bilaval

Sarpada is a raga in Hindustani classical music. It is a raga sung in the morning, that belongs to the Bilaval thaat.

== History ==
Amir Khusrau is said to have created about twelve new melodies, among which is Sarpada.
