= Madhyam =

Fourth svara in Hindustani and Carnatic music

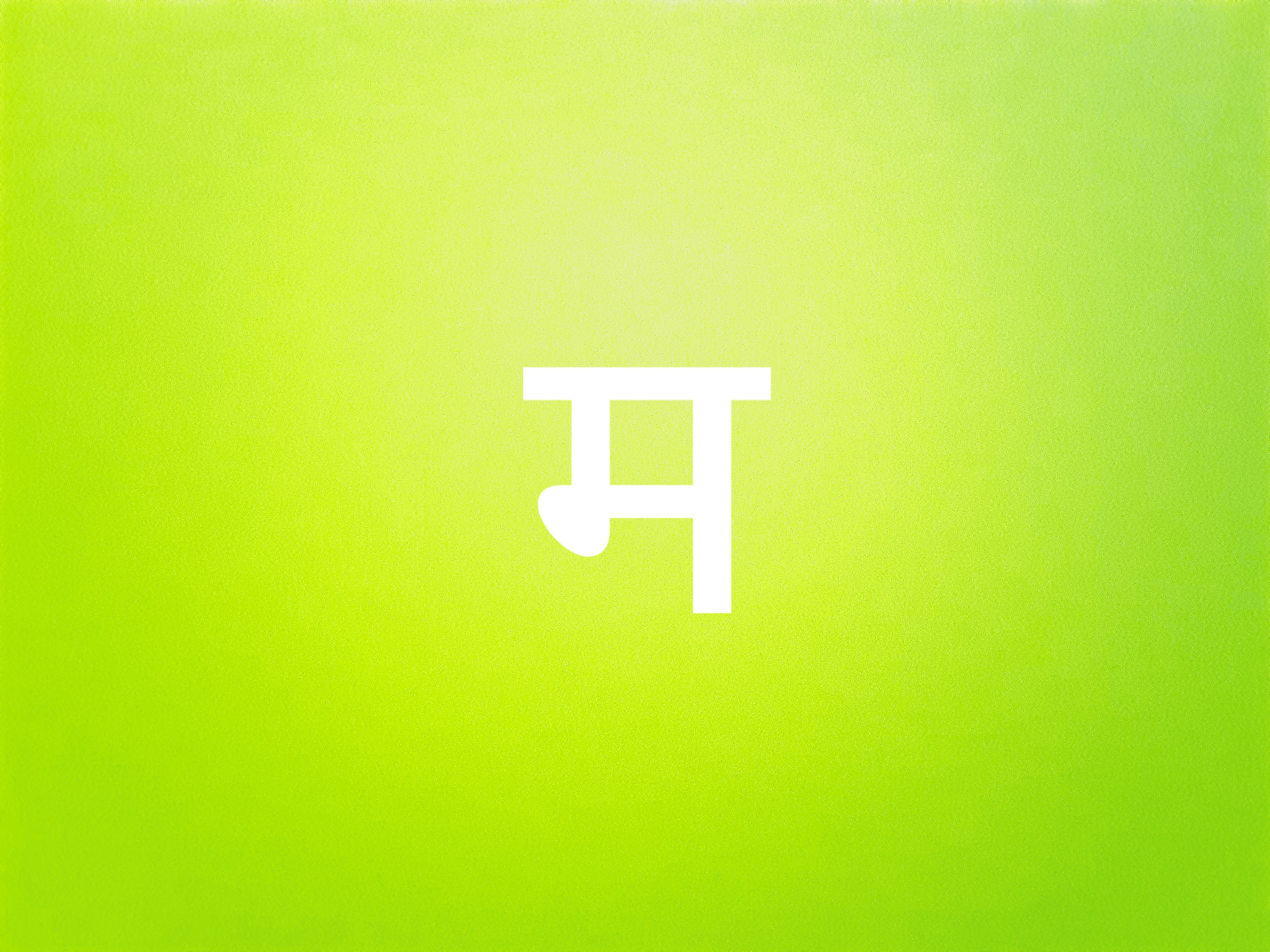
Madhyam (Ma)

Madhyam is the fourth svara of the seven svaras of Hindustani and Carnatic music. Madhyam is the long form of the syllable म. For simplicity in pronouncing while singing the syllable, Madhyam is pronounced as Ma (notation - M). It is called मध्यम in the Devanagri script.

Madhyam is important in Indian classical music :

- fourth svara in an octave or saptak.
- immediate svara following Gandhar (Ga).
- Svara is tivra and Shuddha, the only tivra svara in the saptak.
- Shadja is the basic svara from which the other six svaras derive. Shadja breaks into Shad And Ja. Shad is six and ja is 'giving birth' in Marathi. The translation is:

 षड् - 6, ज -जन्म . Givng birth to the other six notes of the music.

Ma is formed from Shadja.

- Madhyam has 4 Shruti's. Previously the main Shruti for Ma and the other svaras was on the last Shruti but now it is considered to be on the 1st Shurti.

For example if these are the 4 Shruti's of Ma then,

                      Previously this was the position of the main Shruti of Ma.
                       ^ 
             1   2  3  4
             ^
             But this position has become its main Shruti.

T other svaras except Shadja (Sa) and Pancham (Pa) can be komal or tivra svaras, but Sa and Pa are always Shuddha svaras. Svaras Sa and Pa are called Achal Svaras, since these svaras don't move from their original position. Svaras Ra, Ga, Ma, Dha, Ni are Chal Svaras, since they move from their original position.

    Sa, Re, Ga, Ma, Pa, Dha, Ni - Shuddha Svaras
   
    Re, Ga, Dha, Ni - Komal Svaras 
  
    Ma - Tivra Svaras

Ma is a Shuddha Svara as well as a Tivra Svara. Ma is the only Tivra Svara out of the seven svaras. This is denoted as म॓ .

- Ragas from Kalyan Thaat, Poorvi Thaat, Marwa Thaat, Todi Thaat have Tivra Madhyam, rest of the thaats have Shuddha Madhyam.
- Ragas where Ma is the Vadi svara - Raga Kedar, etc. Ragas where Ma is the Samvadi svara include Raga Malkauns.
- Hypothetically speaking, Ma is said to be the Mahipal - Lord Indra, Mahipal as in the three main gods, Bhrama, Vishnu and Shiva were first created i.e. Sakar Bhrama (Sa) and then these three gods created Rishimuni i.e. Re and then Gandharvas were created for singing. Lord Indra or Raja Indra then created Mahipal. Ma is made the acronym of Mahipal for showing the importance of the syllable Ma.
- Madhyam is said to be sourced from call of the heron.
- Madhyam is associated with the Moon.
- Madhyam is associated with the color white.

== See also ==
- List of Ragas in Hindustani classical music
- Svara
- Shadja (Sa)
- Rishabh (Re)
- Gandhar (Ga)
- Pancham (Pa)
- Dhaivat (Dha)
- Nishad (Ni)
