= Grama (government) =

Local governing body in India

Grama is a Sanskrit word for village and grama panchayat is a local governing body in villages.

Each Grama governs a particular village or cluster of villages. Generally these Grama attend to problems of drinking water, street lighting, drainage, primary schools, health centres, etc.
