= Samagana =

Hymns of Veda

Sāma is composition of words in Rigvedic hymns from notes. The hymns of Rigveda form the base of Sāmagāna. Sāmagāna is not merely a name given to singing hymns of Veda but represents the philosophy and science of uniting thought, sound and music. Sāmagāna is purpose of creation of Samaveda.

== Sāma Veda ==
Sāma is singing of hymns from Rigveda alone and not from other Veda-s. "richi adhyoodham sama" ऋचि अध्यूढ्रम साम (Chhandog Upnishad 1.6.1). Hence Sāma is composition of words in Rigvedic hymns into notes. The richā-s or hymns of Rigveda are called yoni or ādhāra as they form the base of Sāmagān. In musicological parlance Sāma Veda has taken mātu (words) from Rigveda and provided dhātu (notes) to these words. (Bharatiya Sangeet Ka Itihaas. Dr. Thakur Jaidev Singh. Calcutta: Sangeet Research Academy, 1994, pp. 35 – 72)

== Parts of Sāma Veda ==
Ārchika.आर्चिक् Only a few hymns in Sāma Veda Samhita were not based upon richa-s taken from Rigveda. The bulk being based on Rigveda is known as Ārchika. It has two parts.

Poorvārchika. पूर्वार्चिक 585 Richa-s are sub-grouped into 6 Prapāthaka-s. Each Prapāthaka has two Ardha-s. Each Ardha has 10 Dashati-s. A collection of ten (here, hymns) is called a Dashati.

Uttarārchika. उत्तरार्चिक It has 1225 richa-s contained in 9 Prapāthaka-s, first five having two ardha-s each and the remaining four having three ardha-s each.

Āranyaka Samhita. अरण्यक सम्हिता It is merely a collection of verses that could be sung.

== Branches of Sāma ==
Patanjali's statement, "sahasravartma samvedaha" सहस्रवर्त्म समवेदः gives rises to speculation that there were a thousand branches of Sām, while he poetically indicated there could be a thousand ways in which Sāma could be sung. In 'Sāmatarpana' there are a maximum of 13 Āchārya-s but today there are only three branches. 1. Rānaneeya राणानीय 2. Kouthumeeya कौथ्हुमीय 3. Jaimineeya जैमिनीय

== Relationship of Ārchika and Gāna-grantha ==
Ārchika grantha (treatises) contains hymns that are yoni or base to Gāna or singing. The collections of suitably modified richa-s are known as Gāna-grantha. These are the true Sāma. Sāma created on richa-s of Poorvārchika are called Grāma-gāna,ग्रामगान् Grāmegeya-gāna, ग्रामगेयोगान् Prakriti-gāna प्रकृतिगान or Veya-gāna वेयगान्. Sāma created on richa-s of Āranyak Samhita are termed Aranya-gāna अरण्यागान or Aranyageya-gāna अरण्यगेयोगान्. Sām created on richa-s of Uttarārchik are known as Ooha-gāna.ऊहगान् The Sanskrit root ooh means 'to modify according to need'. (Caland in preface to PanchaVimshaBrahmin)

== Application of Gāna-s ==
Gramgeyo-gāna: Sung in villages or towns. Aranyageya-gāna: Practiced in solitude of forest. Also called Rahasyageyo-gān. Ooh-gān: Pragatha-s specially created for yajna on basis of Gramgeyo-gāna. Oohya-gāna ऊह्यगान: Pragath-s created for yajna on basis of Rahasyageyo-gāna.

There is a difference in number of songs attributed to different branches. Shri Satvalekar in preface to Sāmaveda Samhita has given the following table of songs.

	Songs of Jaimineeya Branch	Songs of Kouthumeeya Branch
Gramgeyo-gāna:	1233	1197
Aranyageya-gāna:	291	294
Ooha-gāna:	1802	1026
Oohya-gāna:	356	205
Total	3681	2722

== Grām or Scale of Sāmaveda ==
Fox Strangways in Music of Hindustan says, "Vocal scales are conceived downwards. They are so conceived, because the telling notes of the voice in its upper register, and this presents itself, therefore as the starting point for a vocal scale." The Sāyana#-bhāshya (critique) on Sāma-vidhāna Brāhmana establishes that note of Sāma were of nidhana prakriti (diminishing nature) and followed a descending order.

== Swara of Sāma ==
In Naradiya Shiksha the seven notes of Sāma are First, Second, Third, Fourth, Mandra, Krishta and Atiswāra. This indicates that initially only three or four notes were used for Sāmagāna. Ārchika songs were sung on the basis of just one note, e.g. Sa Sa Sa, or Ni Ni Ni. This kind of chanting was well suited to Havana, Mantra-pātha and Japa Gāthik songs were hymns in praise of deities and used two notes, e.g. Ni Ni Ni Ni, Sa Sa Sa Sa. Sāmic songs for the first time used three notes. The word Sāmic is taken to mean three notes. The songs were like Ga Ga Re Re Sa Sa Sa.

Apart from these three basic notes, the singers came across a fourth which they called Swarāntara. When they discovered a note lower than the lowest known note they called it Mandra. When a still lower note than Mandra was found they called it Atiswāra. A higher note determined was called Krishta after Sanskrit root Krish (to scream, speak loudly). So the complete Sāmic Saptaka in descending order contains:

First Note	Second Note	Third Note	Fourth Note	Fifth Note	Sixth Note	Seventh Note
Krishta	Prathama	Dwitiya	Tritiya	Chaturtha	Mandra	Atiswāra
कृष्ट	प्रथम	द्वितीय	तृतीय	चतुर्थ	मन्ध्र	अतिस्वार

To preserve the Sāmik notes, Raga Sāmeshwari was created. Dr. Lalmani Misra first translated the notes M G R S D N P into Shadja gram—S N D P G M R—and then created a Raga which is performed in the evening.

== Shruti Jāti ==
Shruti-jāti is defined as the way in which a particular note could be applied to make the song appealing. There are five with individual signs for three shruti-jāti-s.

Shruti-jāti	Sign
Deepta	U
Āyatā	^
Karunā	*
Mridu	
Madhya	

== Rishis ==
A Rishi in Rig Veda is an author of a Rik, a hymn mantra, derived from oral tradition and direct insight, not from reasoning or intellect. The term Rishi is defined as "rishati jnānena samsāra-pāram” meaning one who goes beyond the mundane world by means of knowledge. Further, some scholars think the root 'drish' (sight) might have given rise to root 'rish' meaning 'to see'.

Sri Aurobindo described Shruti as "divine recordings of cosmic sounds of truth" heard by the Rishis. The Vedas are thus Shruti-s, revealed scriptures.

The Rig Veda contains 10,552 hymns; grouped into 1,028 Suktas each of roughly ten mantras, spread over ten Mandalas (Books). The Mandalas are of differing sizes. These mantra songs are authored by some 400 Rishis of whom about 30 were women.

Certain texts called Anukramani (also called Anukramanika) serve as Index to the Rig Veda and provide information about each hymn of the Rig Veda. The most well-known of the Aukramani is Katyayana's sarvanukramani and is dated around the 2nd century.

== See also ==
- Swara

== Sources ==
- Thakur Jaidev Singh (1994). Bharatiya Sangeet Ka Itihaas. Calcutta: Sangeet Research Academy
- Fox-Strangways (1914). Music of Hindostan. Oxford: Clarendon Press
- Lalmani Misra (1973). Bharatiya Sangeet Vadya
- Lalit Kishor Singh (1954). Dhwani Aur Sangeet. New Delhi: Bharatiya Jnanpith
