= Shadja =

First svara' in Hindustani and Carnatic music

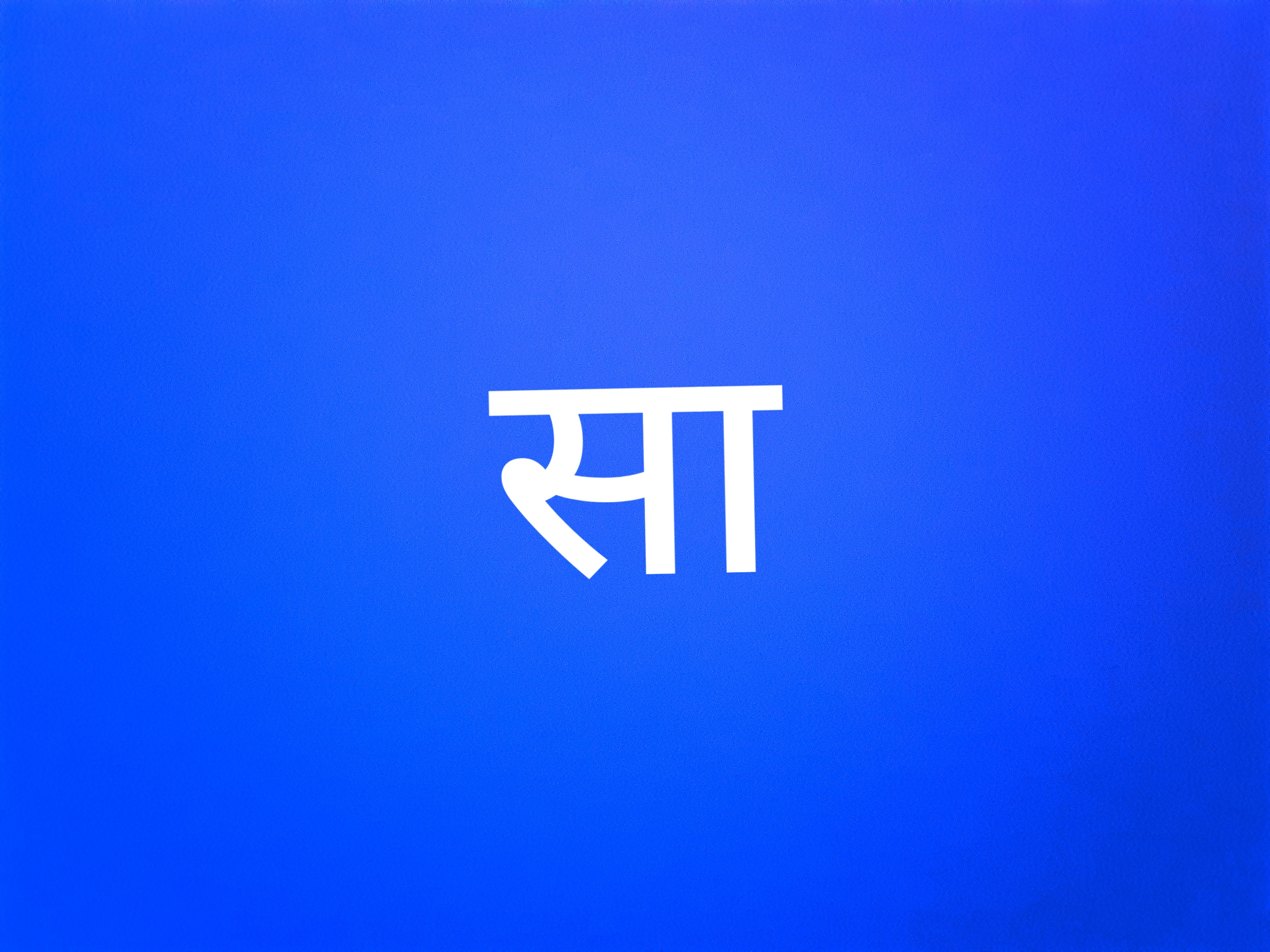
Shadaj (Sa)

Shadja (Sanskrit: षड्ज, romanized: ṣaḍja [ʂɐɖd͡ʑɐ]) is the first of the seven svaras in Hindustani and Carnatic music. Shadaj is the long form of the syllable सा (Sā).

== Details ==
Shadaj is an important feature of Indian classical music. Shadaj is the first svara in an octave or saptak. It is usually the main svara in a raga. The svara that is played on the Tanpura is Shadaj. It is played to assure that the singer is on the right pitch and octave. Shadaj is the base or basic svara. It is a fundamental svara in classical music.

Shadaj serves a critical role in maintaining the tonal framework during performances. Before transitioning from one raga to another, particularly when the ragas share the same set of svaras (notes) but differ in their chalan (movement or progression), the note "Sa" is often played. This practice ensures clarity and prevents confusion by re-establishing the tonal base, allowing the next raga to begin correctly.

The svara of Shadaj is never komal or tivra, it is always Shuddha in any given raga.

- It is said that Shadaj is the basic svara from which all the other six svaras are produced. When the word Shadaj is broken apart, it becomes "Shad" and "Ja". In Marathi, "Shad" is six and "ja" is 'giving birth'. So the translation is:

 षड् – 6, ज – जन्म .

Therefore, it collectively means giving birth to the other six notes of the music.

- The frequency of Shadaj and the related svara are chosen relative to the performer. If the Shadaj is 240 Hz, for example, the frequencies of the seven svaras are: Sa 240 Hz, Re 270 Hz, Ga 300 Hz, Ma 320 Hz, Pa 360 Hz, Dha 400 Hz, and Ni 450 Hz, Sa 480 Hz (Taar Saptak) ... (and so on).

Consequently, the Sa after the Ni of 450 Hz has a frequency of 480 Hz, i.e., the double of the lower octave Sa.

- Sadja has four Shruti's. Previously the main Shruti for all svaras was the last Shruti, but now it is considered to be the first Shruti.

For example, if these are the four Shruti's of Sa then,

                      Previously this was the position of the main Shruti of Sa.
                       ^ 
             1   2  3  4
             ^
             But now this position has become the main Shruti of Sa.

- All the svaras except Shadaj (Sa) and Pancham (Pa) can be komal or tivra svaras but Sa and Pa are always Shuddha svaras . And hence svaras Sa and Pa are called Achal svaras , since these svaras don't move from their original position. svaras Ra, Ga, Ma, Dha, Ni are called Chal svaras , since these svaras move from their original position.

    Sa, Re, Ga, Ma, Pa, Dha, Ni – Shuddha svaras 
   
    Re, Ga, Dha, Ni – Komal svaras 
  
    Ma – Tivra svaras

- Shadaj holds an important position in Indian classical music. It is the only svara that cannot be omitted (varjit) in any raga, making it essential to both the saptak (scale) and the structure of every raga.
- For some ragas where Sa is the Vadi or Samvadi svara, Sa is played repeatedly. But for ragas where Sa is not a Vadi or a Samvadi svara, it is played repeatedly since it is the main svara.
- Ragas where Sa is the Vadi svara – suh as Raga Malkauns. Ragas where Sa is the Samvadi svara - Raga Kedar.
- Shadaj is said to be sourced from the cry of a peacock.
- Shadaj is associated with the planet Mercury.
- Shadaj is associated with the color green.

== See also ==
- List of ragas in Hindustani classical music
- Svara
- Rishabha (Re)
- Gandhara (Ga)
- Madhyam (Ma)
- Pancham (Pa)
- Dhaivata (Dha)
- Nishada (Ni)
