= Pancham (svara) =

Fifth svara in Hindustani and Carnatic music

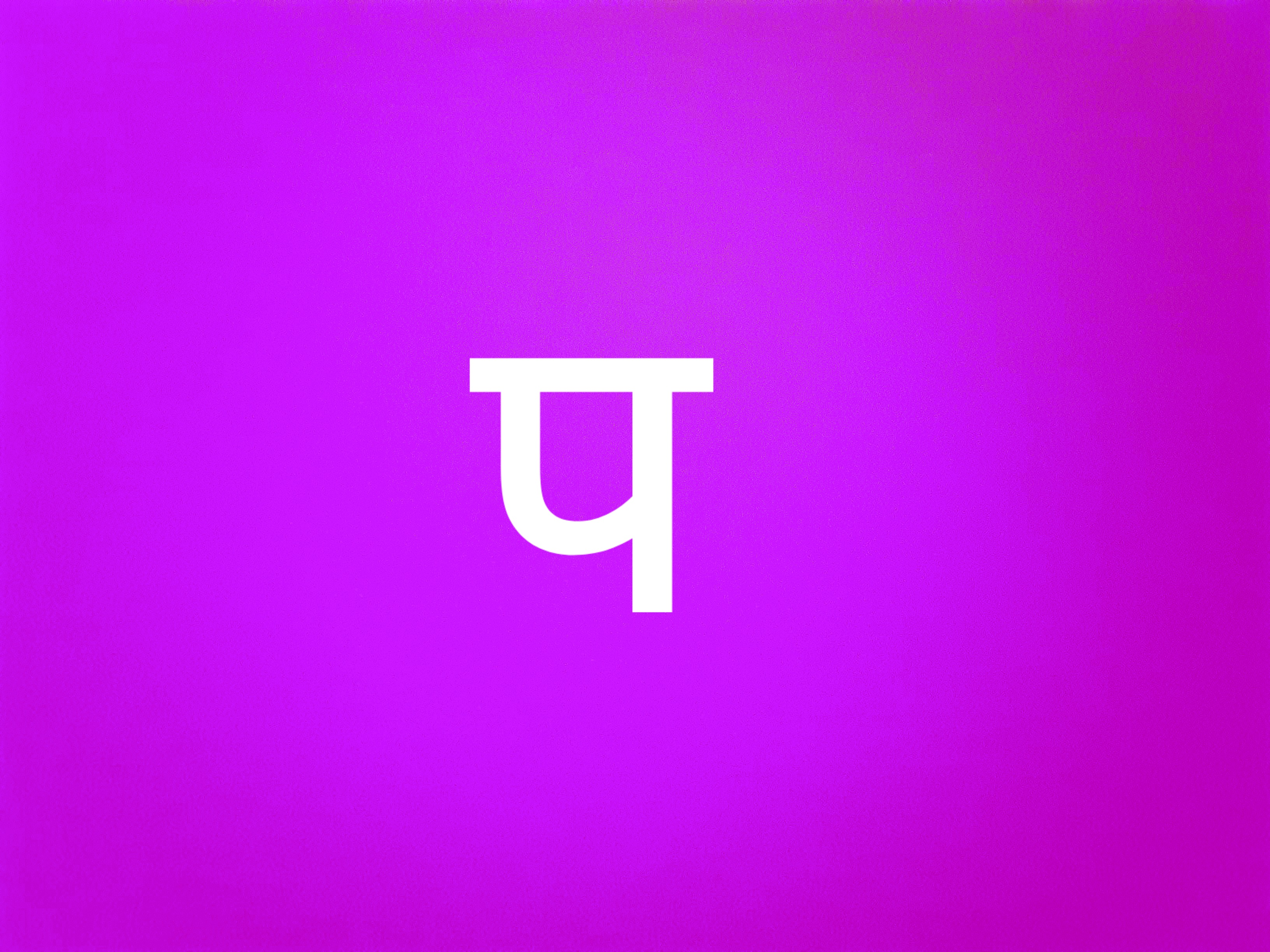
Pancham (Pa)

Pancham (Sanskrit: पञ्चम, romanized: pañcama [pɐɲtɕɐmɐ]) is the fifth of the seven svara of Hindustani and Carnatic music. Pancham is the long form of the syllable प (Pa).

== Details ==
Regarding panchama and its importance in Indian classical music:

- Pancham is the fifth svara in an octave or Saptak.
- Pancham is the immediate next svara of Madhyam (Ma).
- The svara of Pancham is never Komal
- It is said that Shadja is the basic svara from which all 7 svaras are produced. Splitting the word Shadja gives Shad And Ja. It means that Shad is 6 and ja is 'giving birth' in Sanskrit. So basically the translation is:

 षड् - 6, ज -जन्म. Therefore it collectively means giving birth to the other six notes of the music.

So the svara Pa is formed from Shadja.

- The frequency of Pancham is 360 Hz. The frequencies of the seven svaras : Sa 240 Hz, Re 270 Hz, Ga 300 Hz, Ma 320 Hz, Pa 360 Hz, Dha 400 Hz, and Ni 450 Hz, Sa 480 Hz (Taar Saptak) ........ (and so on).

Consequently, the Pa after the Ma of 640 Hz (Taar Saptak) has a frequency of 720 Hz i.e. the double of the Lower octave Pa.

- Pancham has 4 Shruti. Previously the main Shruti not only for Pa but for all the other svaras was on the last Shruti but now it is considered to be on the 1st Shurti.

For example, if these are the 4 Shruti's of Pa then,

                      Previously this was the position of the main Shruti.
                       ^ 
             1   2  3  4
             ^
             But now this position has become the main Shruti.

- All the other svaras except Shadja (Sa) and Pancham (Pa) can be Komal or Tivra svaras but Sa and Pa are always Shuddha svaras . And hence svaras Sa and Pa are called Achal svaras since these svaras don't move from their original position. svaras Ra, Ga, Ma, Dha, Ni are called Chal svaras, since these svaras move from their original position.

    Sa, Re, Ga, Ma, Pa, Dha, Ni - Shuddha svaras 
   
    Re, Ga, Dha, Ni - Komal svaras  
  
    Ma - Tivra svaras

- Ragas where Pa is the Vadi svara - Raga Nat Bhairav, etc. Ragas where Pa is the Samvadi svara include Raga Brindabani Sarang.
- Pancham is said to be sourced from the call of the cuckoo.
- Pancham is associated with the planet Saturn.
- Pancham is associated with Blue or Black colour.

== See also ==
- List of Ragas in Hindustani classical music
- Svara
- Shadja (Sa)
- Rishabh (Re)
- Gandhar (Ga)
- Madhyam (Ma)
- Dhaivat (Dha)
- Nishad (Ni)
