= Dattilam =

Ancient Indian musical text

Dattilam (दत्तिलम्) is an ancient Indian musical text ascribed to the sage (muni) Dattila. It is believed to have been composed shortly after the Natya Shastra of Bharata, and is dated between the 1st and 4th century AD. But Bharathamuni had given reference of the treatise " Dattilam" in his celebrated work "Natyashastra"(1-26) so there is a belief that Dattilam may be a work composed before Bharata Muni.

Written in 244 verses, Dattilam claims to be a synthesis of earlier works on music. The text marks the transition from the sama-gayan (ritual chants as in the Samaveda), to what is known as gandharva music, after the gandharvas, musically adept spirits who are first mentioned in the Mahabharata. Dattilam discusses scales (swara), the base note (sthana), and defines a tonal framework called grama in terms of 22 micro-tonal intervals (sruti) comprising one octave. It also discusses various arrangements of the notes (murchhana), the permutations and combinations of note-sequences (tanas), and alankara or elaboration.

The melodic structure is categorized into 18 groups called jati, which are the fundamental melodic structures pre-dating the concept of the raga. The names of the jatis reflect regional origins, e.g. andhri (Andhra Pradesh), oudichya (Orissa). (Note that many modern raga names are also after regions - e.g. Khamaj, Kanada, Gauda, Multani, Jaunpuri, etc.). Ten characteristics are mentioned for each jati, which resemble the structuring and elaboration of the contemporary raga in Hindustani music.

Dattila (between the 4th century BCE and the 2nd century CE) is an early Indian musicologist, who refined the melodic structures, scales and other aspects of Indian Classical Music. Nothing is known of him beyond his work Dattilam. In Bharata's Natya Shastra, Bharata gives a list of a hundred sons who will put the knowledge of performances (Natyaveda) to use. One of these sons is named Dattila, which had led to some speculation that Dattila may be a little later or contemporary to Bharata. However, today it is mostly felt, given the lack of Natyashastra elements in Dattilam, that he may have been a little earlier or a contemporary. Of course, the date of Bharata is itself not known; usually he is dated somewhere between 400BC to 200AD.
