= Abhinavabharati =

Commentary on Bharata Muni's work of dramatic theory, the Natyasastra

Abhinavabharati is a Sanskrit commentary on the Natyasastra, an ancient treatise on dramatic theory by Bharata Muni. It is the oldest extant commentary on the treatise. The Abhinavabharati was written by Abhinavagupta (c. 950–1020), the great Kashmiri Saivite spiritual leader and a yogi.

In this monumental work, Abhinavagupta explains the rasasutra of Bharata in consonance with the theory of abhivyakti (expression) propounded in Anandavardhana's (820–890) work Dhvanyaloka ("aesthetic suggestion"), as well as the tenets of the Pratyabhijna philosophy of Kashmir.

According to Abhinavagupta, the aesthetic experience is the manifestation of the innate dispositions of the self, such as love and sorrow, by the self. It is characterised by the contemplation of the bliss of the self by the connoisseur. It is akin to the spiritual experience as one transcends the limitations of one's limited self because of the process of universalisation taking place during the aesthetic contemplation of characters depicted in the work of art. Abhinavagupta maintains that this rasa (literally, taste or essence, the outcome) is the summum bonum of all literature.

== Bibliography ==
Natyasastra of Bharatamuni: Text, Commentary of Abhinava Bharati by Abhinavaguptacarya and English Translation/edited by Pushpendra Kumar. Translated by M.M. Ghosh. Delhi, New Bharatiya Book Corporation, 2006, 3 Vols., 1614 p
