= Shruti (music) =

Term used in the music of India

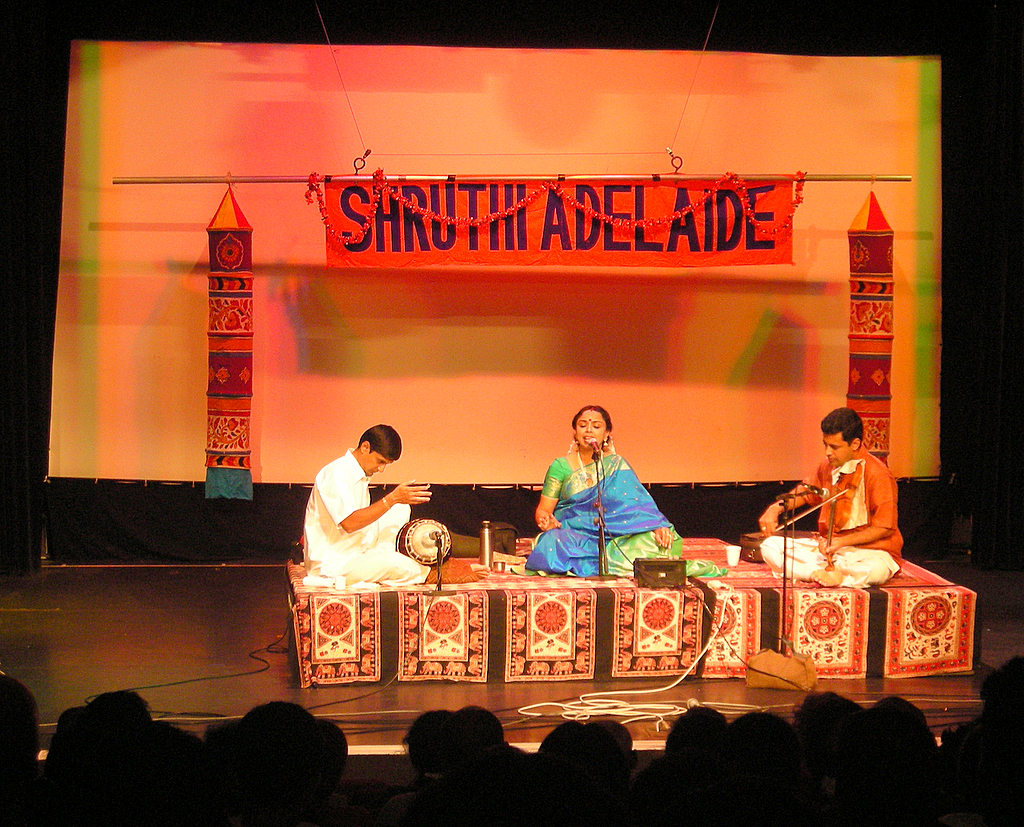
A Carnatic concert

The shruti or śruti [ɕrʊtɪ] is the smallest interval of pitch that the human ear can detect and a singer or musical instrument can produce. The concept is found in ancient and medieval Sanskrit texts such as the Natya Shastra, the Dattilam, the Brihaddeshi, and the Sangita Ratnakara. Chandogya Upanishad speaks of the division of the octave in 22 parts.

The swara differs from the shruti: the shruti is the smallest gradation of pitch available, while a swara is the selected pitches from which the musician constructs the scales, melodies and ragas. The Natya Shastra identifies and discusses twenty-two shruti and seven swara per octave.

It has been used in several contexts throughout the history of Indian music. Recent research has more precisely defined the term shruti, its difference from nada and swara, and identified positions on a string to play 22 shrutis.

The most well-known example of shrutis is probably the use of the ati-komal (extra flat) gandhar in Raga Darbari. Others include the rishabh in Bhairav, the nishad in Bhimpalasi and Miya Malhar, and the gandhar in Todi.

== Meaning ==
The meaning of shruti varies in different systems.

=== Grama system ===
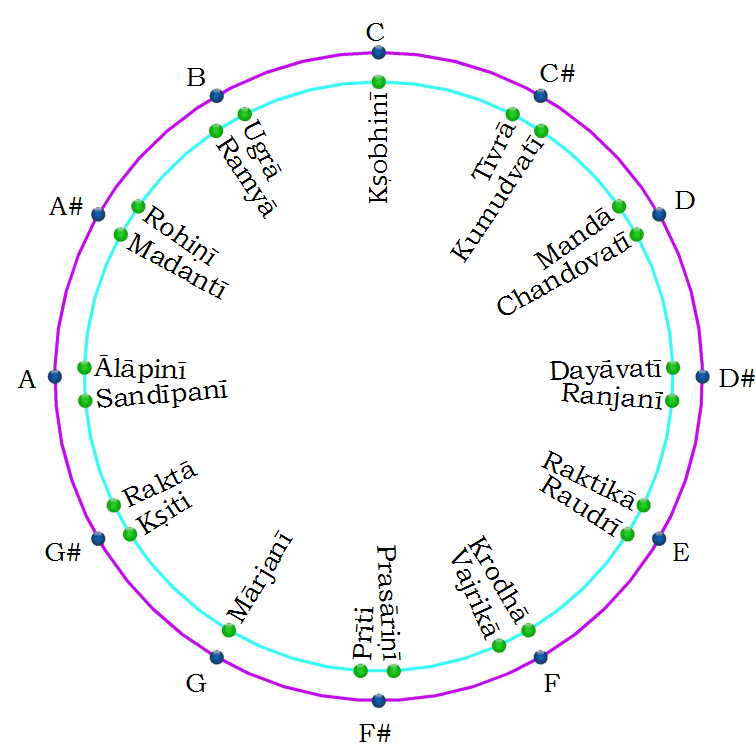
This is a comparison between the Shruti scale and 12-tone equal tempered scale.

Intervals of Shruti according to Vidyadhar Oke

Bharata Muni uses shruti to mean the interval between two notes such that the difference between them is perceptible.

=== Controversy ===
In the current practice of Carnatic music, shruti has several meanings.

In certain ragas, due to inflexions or gamakas on some of those 12 notes, listeners perceive a sharpened or flattened version of an existing note.

Some scientific evidence shows that these intermediate tones perceived in the contemporary rendition of a raga do not hint at the existence of 22 shrutis. The number 22 is not practically significant in the current performance of Carnatic and Hindustani music traditions, partly because different musicians use slightly different "shrutis" when performing the same raga, an example being the ati-komal (extra flat) gandhar in Darbari. The phenomenon of intermediate tones is pursued as an active area of research in Indian Musicology, which says the number of perceptible intermediate tones may be less or more than 22.

An Indian monograph about shruti claims various opinions about the number of shrutis. In recent times the number is broadly agreed upon to be 22. Recognizing the controversy over the number and the exact ratios of shruti intervals, it also says that not all shruti intervals are equal and known as pramana shruti (22%), nyuna shruti (70%) and purana shruti (90%). Each shruti may be approximated in the 53EDO system.

== Relationship to dhwani, nada, and swara ==
Shruti is linked to the fundamental aspects of swara. Of the twenty-two shruti, veena scholars identified the 4th shruti as the sa solfege, 7th as re, 9th as ga, 13th as ma, 17th as pa, 20th as dha, and 22nd as ni.

=== Identification of a shruti ===
In performance, notes identified as one of the 12 universal pitch classes of the chromatic scale (swara-prakara) are the shrutis, and connected unidentified notes between them are nadas. The human ear takes about 20–45 msec to identify a note within the range of the human voice—from 100 to 1000 Hz. The ear can identify shrutis played or sung longer than that—but cannot identify nadas played or sung faster than that limit, but can only hear them. Lack of appreciation of this difference has led to many scientists to opine that because of the meend and the oscillating notes, it is hard to determine the exact numerical frequencies.

=== Natural existence of 22 shrutis on a string ===
In ancient times, shruti was described in Sanskrit as Shruyate iti Shruti, meaning "What is heard is a shruti". The "understanding" and "learning" part is the natural fact that on 22 specific points on a string, the perception of notes changes.

Brihaddeshi (Sanskrit) by Pandit Matanga mentions after Shloka 24, in Shrutiprakarana (Chapter on Shrutis) that "[o]nly when the ear understands (the point on the string where perception of the notes changes), does that sound become a Shruti." He further says that these points on the string are very precise, as in Shloka 28, Chapter 1, in Nadaprakarana (Chapter on Nadas) that "[r]eaching (the point on the string where the perception of the notes changes), and reverting (from there) results in the precision that is called as 'Shruti.'"

There are 12 universally identifiable musical notes (pitch classes of the chromatic scale or Swara-prakara) in an octave. They indicate "a musical note or scale degree, but Shruti is a more subtle division of the octave".

=== Poorna, pramana and nyuna shrutis ===
When the frequency and positions of all 22 shrutis are calculated, three ratios exist: 256/243 (Pythagorean limma, Pythagorean diatonic semitone, or Pythagorean minor semitone), 25/24 (a type of just chromatic semitone), and 81/80 (syntonic comma). Out of these, 81/80 operates in the 'region' of 10 notes and is called pramana (transl. "standard", region of the note). The 256/243 ratio is called poorna (transl. "big"), and 25/24 nyuna (transl. "small"). Poornas come between shrutis 0–1, 4–5, 8–9, 12–13, 13–14, 17–18, and 21–22, nyunas between shrutis 2–3, 6–7, 10–11, 15–16, 19–20, and pramanas between shrutis 1–2, 3–4, 5–6, 7–8, 9–10, 11–12, 14–15, 16–17, 18–19, 20–21.

=== Gamakas ===
In any gamaka, only shrutis and nadas exist. The threshold of identification of a musical note within the range of human voice of 100–1000 Hz is 20–45 msec. Shrutis can be identified by the human ear because they are played for this time limit at the fastest. In contrast, connecting nadas are played faster than this limit, which prevents the human ear from identifying them. The major difference in the two systems is the way they combine shrutis and connect nadas, resulting in characteristically different music between the styles. Many ancient Sanskrit and Tamil works refer to the 22 shrutis as the foundation of the Indian Music Scale.

=== Melakarta system ===
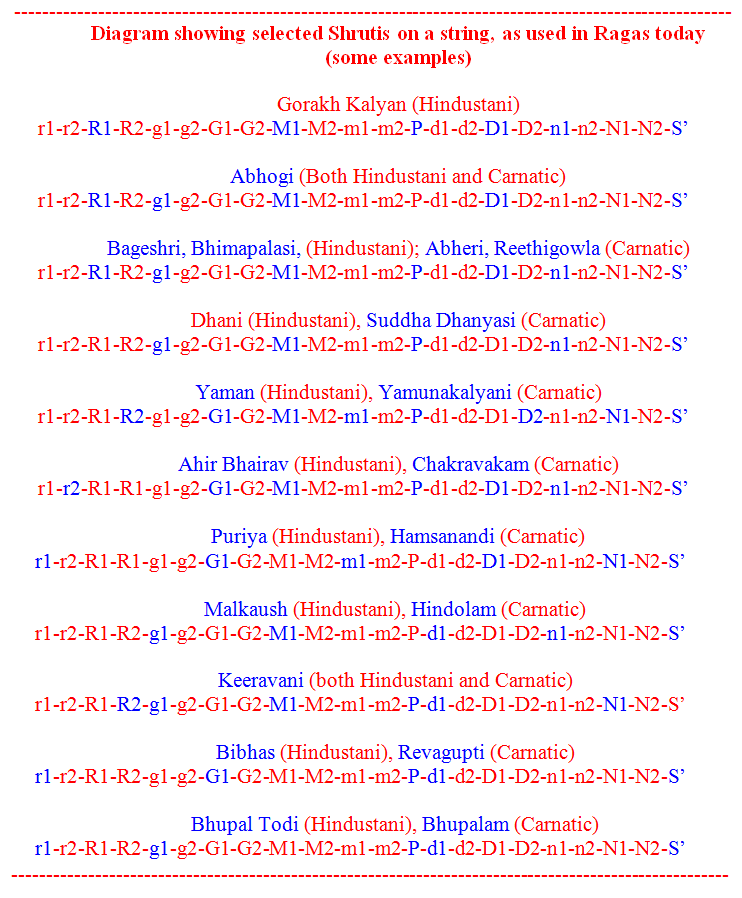
Examples of selected Shrutis on a string as used in Ragas today

The system of 72 basic types of singing or playing scales (thaļas) evolved with specific mathematical combinations of the universal 12 pitch classes. The selection of the 22 shrutis in each of them depends on the rāga chosen. The shrutis in a rāga should be ideally related to each other, by natural ratios 100:125, 100:133.33, 100:150, and 100:166.66. A rāga can have a fewer number of notes than in a thaļa.

=== Shruti value ambiguity ===
Some suggest that the best way to find the exact positions of shrutis is by analyzing the frequencies players use in actual performances. When different artists performed rāga yaman on flute, sarangi, sitar, and voice, pitch accuracy was found to be "relative" and "subjective", and "neither rigidly fixed" "nor randomly varying"; the "same Swara was pitched differently at different times by the same artiste in the same raga", and "different artistes intoned the same swara differently in the same raga".

== Ancient treatises on Indian classical music and performing arts ==
- Natya Shastra by Bharata
- Dattilam by Dattila
- Brihaddeshi by Matanga Muni
- Abhinavabharati – Abhinava Gupta's commentary on Natya Shastra
- Sangita Ratnakara by Sarangadeva
- Svaramelakalanidhi by Ramamatya
- Charurdandi Prakashika by Venkatamakhin
- Ragavibodha by Somanatha
