= Svara =

Note in the octave (Indian classical music)

Swara (Sanskrit: स्वर) or svara is an Indian classical music term that connotes simultaneously a breath, a vowel, a note, the sound of a musical note corresponding to its name, and the successive steps of the octave, or saptanka. More comprehensively, it is the ancient Indian concept of the complete dimension of musical pitch. At its most basic comparison to western music, a swara is, essentially, a "note" of a given scale. However, that is but a loose interpretation of the word, as a swara is identified as both a musical note and tone; a "tone" is a precise substitute for sur, relating to "tunefulness". Traditionally, Indian musicians have just seven swaras/notes with short names: sa, re, ga, ma, pa, dha, ni, which they collectively refer to as saptank or saptaka. This is one of the reasons why swara is considered a symbolic expression for the number seven. In another loose comparison to western music, saptak (as an octave or scale) may be interpreted as solfège, e.g. the notes of a scale as Do, Re, Mi, Fa, Sol, La, Ti (and Do).

== Origins and history ==
=== Etymology ===
The word svara (Sanskrit: स्वर) is derived from the root svar- which means "to sound". To be precise, the svara is defined in the Sanskrit nirukta system as:

- svaryate iti svaraḥ (स्वर्यते इति स्वरः, does breathing, shines, makes sound),
- svayam rājate iti svaraḥ (स्वयं राजते इति स्वरः, appears on its own) and
- sva rañjayati iti svaraḥ (स्व रञ्जयति इति स्वरः, that which colours itself in terms of appealing sound).

The Kannada word svara and Tamil alphabet or letter suram do not represent a sound, but rather more generally the place of articulation (PoA) (பிறப்பிடம்), where one generates a sound, and the sounds made there can vary in pitch.

=== In the Vedas ===
The word is found in the Vedic literature, particularly the Samaveda, where it means accent and tone, or a musical note, depending on the context. The discussion there focusses on three accent pitch or levels: svarita (sounded, circumflex normal), udatta (high, raised) and anudatta (low, not raised). However, scholars question whether the singing of hymns and chants were always limited to three tones during the Vedic era.

In the general sense svara means tone, and applies to chanting and singing. The basic svaras of Vedic chanting are udatta, anudatta and svarita. Vedic music has madhyama or ma as principal note so that tonal movement is possible towards lower and higher pitches, thus ma is taken for granted as fixed in any tonal music (madhyama avilopi, मध्यम अविलोपी).

One-svara Vedic singing is called ārcika chanting, e.g. in chanting the following texts on one note:

- aum aum aum / om om om
- hari om tatsat
- shivoham shivoham
- raam raam raam raam
- raadhe raadhe
- siyaa-raam siyaa-raam

or the like. Two-svara Vedic singing is called gāthika chanting, e.g. in chanting the following text on two notes:

om	shaan-	tih,	om	shaan-	tih,	om	shaan-	tih, ...
M	M----	P-M,	M	M----	P-M,	M	M----	P-M, ...	or
P	P----	D-P,	P	P----	D-P,	P	P----	D-P, ...	or
S	S----	R-S,	S	S----	R-S,	S	S----	R-S, ...

The musical octave is said to have evolved from the elaborate and elongated chants of the Samaveda, based on these basic svaras. Siksha is the subject that deals with phonetics and pronunciation. Naradiya Siksha elaborates the nature of svaras, both Vedic chants and the octave.

=== In the Upaniṣads ===
The word also appears in the Upanishads. For example, it appears in Jaiminiya Upanishad Brahmana section 111.33, where the cyclic rise and setting of sun and world, is referred to as "the music of spheres", and the sun is stated to be "humming the wheel of the world". According to the philosopher Ananda Coomaraswamy, the roots "svar", meaning "to shine" (whence "surya" or sun), and "svr", meaning "to sound or resound" (whence "svara", “musical note”) and also in some contexts "to shine", are all related in the ancient Indian imagination. This connection, however, is not supported by linguistic evidence and mere speculative (cf. William Dwight Whitney: The Roots, Verb-Forms, and Primary Derivatives of the Sanskrit Language entry sub svar-, footnote. He states that because of close formal similarity between these two distinct roots it is hard to tell them apart. So it is a case of homophony. More recent linguistic research points out that svar- „sun” is related to the proto-indo-european root *sóh₂wl̥-, whereas svar- „sound“ is related to pie. *swer-.)

=== In Śāstra literature ===
The concept of a svara is found in Chapter 28 of the text Nāṭya Śāstra, estimated to have been completed between 200 BCE to 200 CE. It names the unit of tonal measurement or audible unit the śruti, with verse 28.21 introducing the musical scale as follows:

तत्र स्वराः –
षड्‍जश्‍च ऋषभश्‍चैव गान्धारो मध्यमस्तथा ।
पञ्‍चमो धैवतश्‍चैव सप्तमोऽथ निषादवान् ॥२१॥
| नत्य शास्त्र | २८.२१ |

tatra svarāḥ –
ṣaḍ‍jaś‍ca ṛṣabhaś‍caiva gāndhāro madhyamastathā ।
pañ‍camo dhaivataś‍caiva saptamo'tha niṣādavān ॥21॥

Natya Shastra – 28.21

This text contains the modern names:

[Here are the] swaras -
Shadaj, Rishabha, Gandhara, Madhyama,
Panchama, Dhaivata, [and seventh] Nishada.

These seven svaras are shared by both major raga systems of Indian classical music, that is the North Indian (Hindustani) and South Indian (Carnatic).

== Seven svaras and solfège (sargam) ==
Sapta svara, also called sapta swara or sapta sur, refers to the seven distinct notes of the octave or the seven successive svaras of a saptak. The sapta svara can be collectively referred to as the sargam (which is an acronym of the consonants of the first four svaras). Sargam is the Indian equivalent to solfège, a technique for the teaching of sight-singing. As in Western moveable-Do solfège, the svara Sa is the tonic of a piece or scale. The seven svaras of the saptak are the fundamentals of heptatonic scales or melakarta ragas and thaats in Carnatic and Hindustani classical music.

The seven svaras are śaḍja (षड्ज), r̥ṣabha (ऋषभ), gāndhāra (गान्धार), madhyama (मध्यम), pañcama (पञ्चम), dhaivata (धैवत) and niṣāda (निषाद). The svaras of the sargam are often learnt in abbreviated form: sā, ri (Carnatic) or re (Hindustani), ga, ma, pa, dha, ni. Of these, the first svara that is "sa", and the fifth svara that is "pa", are considered anchors (achal svaras) that are unalterable, while the remaining have flavours (komal and tivra svaras) that differs between the two major systems.

Svara in North Indian system of raga
Svara (Long)	Shadja (षड्ज)	Rishabh (ऋषभ)	Gandhar (गान्धार)	Madhyam (मध्यम)	Pancham (पंचम)	Dhaivat (धैवत)	Nishad (निषाद)
Svara (Short)	Sa (सा)	Re (रे)	Ga (गा)	Ma (म)	Pa (प)	Dha (ध)	Ni (नि)
12 Varieties (names)	C (Shadja)	D♭ (komal re); D (shuddha re)	E♭ (komal gā); E (shuddha gā)	F (shuddha ma); F♯ (teevra ma)	G (pancham)	A♭ (komal dha); A (shuddha dha)	B♭ (komal ni); B (shuddha ni)

Svara in South Indian system of raga
Svara (Long)	Shadjam	Rishabham	Gandharam	Madhyamam	Panchamam	Dhaivatam	Nishadam
Svara (Short)	Sa	Ri	Ga	Ma	Pa	Dha	Ni
16 Varieties (names)	C (Shadjam)	D♭ (shuddha ri); D♮ (chatushruti ri); D♯ (shatshruti ri)	E (shuddha gā); E♭ (sadharana gā); E♮ (antara gā)	F♮ (shuddha ma); F♯ (prati ma)	G (panchamam)	A♭ (shuddha dha); A♮ (chatushruti dha); A♯ (shatshruti dha)	B (shuddha ni); B♭ (kaishiki ni); B♮ (kakali ni)

=== Interpretation ===
North Indian Hindustani music has fixed names of a relative pitches, but South Indian Carnatic music keeps on making interchanges of the names of pitches in case of ri-ga and dha-ni whenever required. Swaras appear in successive steps in an octave. More comprehensively, svara-graam (scale) is the practical concept of Indian music comprising seven + five= twelve most useful musical pitches. Sage Matanga made a very important statement in his Brihaddeshi some 1500 years ago that:

षड्जादयः स्वराः न भवन्ति
आकारादयः एव स्वराः
Shadaj aadayah svaraah na bhavanti
aakar aadayah eva svaraah

i.e. Shadaj, Rishabh, Gandhar, ... (and their utterance) are not the real svaras but their pronunciation in the form of aa-kar, i-kaar, u-kaar ... are the real form of the svaras.

It is said that Shadaj is the basic svara from which all the other 6 svaras are produced. When we break the word Shadaj then we get, Shad- And -Ja. Shad is 6 and ja is 'giving birth' in Indian languages. So basically the translation is :

 षड् - 6, ज -जन्म . Therefore, it collectively means giving birth to the other 6 notes of the music.

The absolute frequencies for all svaras are variable, and are determined relative to the saptak or octave. E.g. given Sa 240 Hz, Re 270 Hz, Ga 288 Hz, Ma 320 Hz, Pa 360 Hz, Dha 405 Hz, and Ni 432 Hz, then the Sa after the Ni of 432 Hz has a frequency of 480 Hz i.e. double that of the lower octave Sa, and similarly all the other 6 svaras. Considering the Sa of the Madhya Saptak then frequencies of the other svaras will be,

                  Sa      Re       Ga     Ma      Pa      Dha     Ni
  Mandra Saptak: 120 Hz, 135 Hz, 144 Hz, 160 Hz, 180 Hz, 202.5 Hz, 216 Hz.}
  Madhya Saptak: 240 Hz, 270 Hz, 288 Hz, 320 Hz, 360 Hz, 405 Hz, 432 Hz.} 
   Taara Saptak: 480 Hz, 540 Hz, 576 Hz, 640 Hz, 720 Hz, 810 Hz, 864 Hz.}

All the other svaras except Shadaj (Sa) and Pancham (Pa) can be komal or tivra svaras but Sa and Pa are always shuddha svaras. And hence svaras Sa and Pa are called achal svaras, since these svaras don't move from their original position. Svaras Ra, Ga, Ma, Dha, Ni are called chal svaras, since these svaras move from their original position.

    Sa, Re, Ga, Ma, Pa, Dha, Ni - Shuddha Svaras
    Re, Ga, Dha, Ni - Komal Svaras
    Ma - Tivra Svaras

Talking about Shrutis of these Sapta Svaras,

Sa, Ma and Pa have four Shrutis, respectively
Re and Dha have three Shrutis, respectively
Ga and Ni have two Shrutis, respectively

And these all Shrutis add up to 22 Shrutis in total.

== Relationship to śruti ==
The svara differs slightly from the śruti concept in Indian music. Both the svara and the śruti are but the sounds of music. According to the music scholars of the distant past, the śruti is generally understood as a microtone besides veda and an ear. In the context of advanced music, a śruti is the smallest gradation of pitch that a human ear can detect and a singer or instrument can produce. There are 22 śruti or microtones in a saptaka of Hindustani music but Carnatic music assumes 24 śruti. A svara is a selected pitch from 22 śrutis, using several of such svaras a musician constructs scales, melodies and ragas. In the presence of a drone-sound of perfectly tuned Tanpuras, an ideal svara sounds sweet and appealing to human ear but particularly some 10 śrutis of the saptaka sound out of pitch (besuraa) when compared to the very drone. A tuneful and pleasing tone of the svara is located at a fixed interval but there is no fixed interval defined for two consecutive śrutis anywhere that can safely and scientifically be used throughout with respect to a perfect drone sound.

The ancient Sanskrit text Natya Shastra by Bharata identifies and discusses twenty two shruti and seven shuddha and two vikrita svara. The Natya Shastra mentions that in Shadaj graama, the svara pairs saa-ma and saa-pa are samvaadi svaras (consonant pair) and are located at the interval of 9 and 13 shruti respectively. Similarly, svara pairs re-dha and ga-ni are samvaadi svara too. Without giving any example of 'a standard measure' or 'equal interval' between two successive shrutis, Bharata declared that saa, ma or pa shall have an interval of 4 shrutis measured from the pitch of the preceding svara, re or dha shall have an interval of 3 shrutis measured from the pitch of the preceding svara and ga or ni shall have an interval of 2 shrutis measured from the pitch of the preceding svara respectively. The following quote explains it all:

चतुश्चतुश्चतुश्चैव षड्जमध्यमपञ्चमाः
द्वे द्वे निषादगान्धारौ त्रिस्त्री ऋषभधैवतौ
Chatush chatush chatush chaiva Shadaj madhyama panchamaah.
Dve dve nishaada gaandhaarau tristrii rishabha dhaivatau.

Bharata also makes some unscientific and unacceptable observations ignoring practically proven truths like samvaad (samvaada/ संवाद) or consonance of ma-ni, re-dha, re-pa and ga-ni as each of these svara pairs do not have equal number of shrutis to establish samvaad. In reality, the above-mentioned pairs DO create samvaad or consonances which Bharata did not recognize for unknown reasons. None of the musicologists give in writing the 'practical basis' or technique of ascertaining the ideal tonal gap between the note pairs like saa-re, re-ga, ga-ma, ma-pa, pa-dha, dha-ni, ni-saa* (taar saa) until Sangeet Paarijat of Ahobal (c. 1650). The svara studies in ancient Sanskrit texts include the musical gamut and its tuning, categories of melodic models and the raga compositions.

Perhaps the greats like Bharata, Sage Matanga and Shaarnga-deva did not know the secret of tuneful tones (up to acceptable level of normal human ear, on the basis of taanpuraa drone) for they do not mention use of drone sound for any of the musical purposes. Most of the practicing musicians knew very well that all the tuneful tones of seven notes could be discovered with the help of the theory of samvaad, in which saa-saa* (*means upper octave), saa-ma and saa-pa play the most crucial role.

== Notation and practice ==
As per the widely used Bhatkhande Svara Lipi (Bhakthande's Swar Notation script), a dot above a letter (svara symbol) indicates that the note is sung one saptak (octave) higher, and a dot below indicates one saptak lower. Komal notes are indicated by an underscore, and the tívra Ma has a line on top which can be vertical or horizontal. (Or, if a note with the same name - Sa, for example - is an octave higher than the note represented by S, an apostrophe is placed to the right: S'. If it is an octave lower, the apostrophe is placed to the left: 'S. Apostrophes can be added as necessary to indicate the octave: for example, ''g would be the note komal Ga in the octave two octaves below that which begins on the note S (that is, two octaves below g).) In other words, the basic rule is that the number of dots or apostrophes above or below the svara symbol means the number of times dots or apostrophes, respectively, above or below the corresponding svara in madhya saptak (middle octave).

The basic mode of reference in the Hindustani system is that which is equivalent to the Western Ionian mode or major scale (called Bilaval thaat in Hindustani music, Sankarabharanam in Carnatic). In the Carnatic system however, the beginner exercises are sung in the raga Mayamalavagowla, which corresponds to the Western Double harmonic scale. The reason for this being the symmetry of the scale, with the first half mirroring the second half, and the existence of all the important intervals (half, whole and double note). This is something that is absent in the major scale, which only consists of half and whole notes. In any seven-tone mode (starting with S), R, G, D, and N can be natural (shuddha, lit. 'pure') or flat (komal, 'soft') but never sharp, and the M can be natural or sharp (teevra) but never flat, making twelve notes as in the Western chromatic scale. If a svara is not natural (shuddha), a line below a letter indicates that it is flat (komal) and an acute accent above indicates that it is sharp (tīvra, 'intense'). Sa and Pa are immovable (once Sa is selected), forming a just perfect fifth.

In some notation systems, the distinction is made with capital and lowercase letters. When abbreviating these tones, the form of the note which is relatively lower in pitch always uses a lowercase letter, while the form which is higher in pitch uses an uppercase letter. So komal Re/Ri uses the letter r and shuddha Re/Ri, the letter R, but shuddha Ma uses m because it has a raised form - teevra Ma - which uses the letter M. Sa and Pa are always abbreviated as S and P, respectively, since they cannot be altered.

Comparison between Carnatic, Hindustani, and Western Notations
Semitones from Tonic	Carnatic name		Hindustani name		Western note (when the tonic, Sa, is C)
	Full form	Abbreviation	Full form	Abbreviation	Western note (when the tonic, Sa, is C)
0	Ṣaḍjam	Sa	Ṣaḍj	Sa	C
1	Śuddha R̥ṣabham	Ri₁	Kōmal R̥ṣabh	Re	D♭
2	Catuśruti R̥ṣabham	Ri₂	Śuddh R̥ṣabh	Re	D
2	Śuddha Gāndhāram	Ga₁	Śuddh R̥ṣabh	Re	E𝄫
3	Ṣaṭśruti R̥ṣabham	Ri₃	Kōmal Gāndhār	Ga	D♯
3	Sādhāraṇa Gāndhāram	Ga₂	Kōmal Gāndhār	Ga	E♭
4	Antara Gāndhāram	Ga₃	Śuddh Gāndhār	Ga	E
5	Śuddha Madhyamam	Ma₁	Śuddh Madhyam	Ma	F
6	Prati Madhyamam	Ma₂	Tīvra Madhyam	Ḿa	F♯
7	Pañcamam	Pa	Pañcam	Pa	G
8	Śuddha Dhaivatam	Dha₁	Kōmal Dhaivat	Dha	A♭
9	Catuśruti Dhaivatam	Dha₂	Śuddh Dhaivat	Dha	A
9	Śuddha Niṣādam	Ni₁	Śuddh Dhaivat	Dha	B𝄫
10	Ṣaṭśruti Dhaivatam	Dha₃	Kōmal Niṣād	Ni	A♯
10	Kaiśikī Niṣādam	Ni₂	Kōmal Niṣād	Ni	B♭
11	Kākalī Niṣādam	Ni₃	Śuddh Niṣād	Ni	B

=== Svaras in Carnatic music ===
The svaras in Carnatic music are slightly different in the twelve-note system. Each svara is either prakr̥ti (invariant) or vikr̥ti (variable). Ṣaḍjam and Pañcamam are prakr̥ti svaras, whilst R̥ṣabham, Gāndhāram, Mādhyamam, Dhaivatam and Niṣādam are vikr̥ti svaras. Ma has two variants, and each of Ri, Ga, Dha and Ni has three variants. The mnemonic syllables for each vikṛti svara use the vowels "a", "i" and "u" successively from lowest to highest. For example, r̥ṣabham has the three ascending variants "ra", "ri" and "ru", being respectively 1, 2 and 3 semitones above the tonic note, ṣaḍjam.

Position	Svara (स्वर)	Short name	Notation	Mnemonic	Semitones from Sa
1	Ṣaḍjam (षड्जम्)	Sa	S	sa	0
2	Śuddha R̥ṣabham (शुद्ध ऋषभम्)	Ri	R₁	ra	1
3	Catuśruti R̥ṣabham (चतुश्रुति ऋषभम्)	Ri	R₂	ri	2
3	Śuddha Gāndhāram (शुद्ध गान्धारम्)	Ga	G₁	ga	2
4	Ṣaṭśruti R̥ṣabham (षट्श्रुति ऋषभम्)	Ri	R₃	ru	3
4	Sādhāraṇa Gāndhāram (साधारण गान्धारम्)	Ga	G₂	gi	3
5	Antara Gāndhāram (अन्तर गान्धारम्)	Ga	G₃	gu	4
6	Śuddha Madhyamam (शुद्ध मध्यमम्)	Ma	M₁	ma	5
7	Prati Madhyamam (प्रति मध्यमम्)	Ma	M₂	mi	6
8	Pañcamam (पञ्चमम्)	Pa	P	pa	7
9	Śuddha Dhaivatam (शुद्ध धैवतम्)	Dha	D₁	dha	8
10	Catuśruti Dhaivatam (चतुश्रुति धैवतम्)	Dha	D₂	dhi	9
10	Śuddha Niṣādam (शुद्ध निषादम्)	Ni	N₁	na	9
11	Ṣaṭśruti Dhaivatam (षट्श्रुति धैवतम्)	Dha	D₃	dhu	10
11	Kaiśikī Niṣādam (कैशिकी निषादम्)	Ni	N₂	ni	10
12	Kākalī Niṣādam (काकली निषादम्)	Ni	N₃	nu	11

As you can see above, Catuśruti Ṛṣabham and Śuddha Gāndhāram share the same pitch (3rd key/position). Hence if C is chosen as Ṣaḍjam, D would be both Catuśruti R̥ṣabham and Śuddha Gāndhāram. Hence they will not occur in same rāgam together. Similarly for the two svaras each at pitch positions 4, 10 and 11.

== Cultural, spiritual, and religious symbolism ==
Through svara, Īśvara [God] is realized.

— A proverb among Indian musicians
Translator: Guy Beck
- Each svara is associated with the sound produced by a particular animal or a bird, like,
  - Sa is said to be sourced from the cry of a peacock,
  - Ri is said to be sourced from the lowing of a bull,
  - Ga is said to be sourced from the bleating of a goat,
  - Ma is said to be sourced from call of the heron,
  - Pa is said to be sourced from call of the cuckoo,
  - Dha is said to be sourced from the neighing of the horse,
  - Ni is said to be sourced from the trumpeting of the elephant.

So each svara is said to be sourced from the sound produced by an animal or a bird.

- Each svara is also associated with a classical planet:
  - Sa – Mercury,
  - Re – Mars,
  - Ga – Sun,
  - Ma – Moon,
  - Pa - Saturn,
  - Dha – Jupiter,
  - Ni - Venus.
- Each svara is also associated with a colour:
  - Sa – Green,
  - Re – Red,
  - Ga – Golden,
  - Ma – White,
  - Pa - Blue or Black,
  - Dha – Yellow,
  - Ni - Multi coloured.
- Each svara is also associated with the 7 Chakras in the body:
  - Sa - Muladhara
  - Re - Svadisthana
  - Ga - Manipura
  - Ma - Anahata
  - Pa - Vishuddhi
  - Dha - Ajna
  - Ni - Sahasrara

== See also ==
- Hindustani classical music
- Indian classical dance
- Carnatic music
- Ancient Tamil music
- Gamak
- Raga

== Bibliography ==
- Daniélou, Alain (1949). Northern Indian Music, Volume 1. Theory & technique; Volume 2. The main rāgǎs. London: C. Johnson. OCLC 851080.
- Randel, Don Michael (2003). The Harvard Dictionary of Music (fourth ed.). Cambridge, MA: Harvard University Press. ISBN 978-0-674-01163-2.
- Kaufmann, Walter (1968). The Ragas of North India. Oxford & Indiana University Press. ISBN 978-0253347800. OCLC 11369.
- Lidova, Natalia (2014). Natyashastra. Oxford Bibliographies Online. doi:10.1093/obo/9780195399318-0071.
- Martinez, José Luiz (2001). Semiosis in Hindustani Music. Motilal Banarsidass. ISBN 978-81-208-1801-9.
- Mehta, Tarla (1995). Sanskrit Play Production in Ancient India. Motilal Banarsidass. ISBN 978-81-208-1057-0.
- Rowell, Lewis (2015). Music and Musical Thought in Early India. University of Chicago Press. ISBN 978-0-226-73034-9.
- Te Nijenhuis, Emmie (1974). Indian Music: History and Structure. BRILL Academic. ISBN 90-04-03978-3.
- Titon, Jeff Todd; Cooley; Locke; McAllester; Rasmussen (2008). Worlds of Music: An Introduction to the Music of the World's Peoples. Cengage. ISBN 978-0-534-59539-5.
