= List of ragas in Hindustani classical music =

This is a list of various ragas/raags in Hindustani classical music. There is no exact count/known number of ragas which are there in Indian classical music. There are currently 1164 raags in this list.

Once Ustad Vilayat Khan saheb at the Sawai Gandharva Bhimsen Festival, Pune said before beginning his performance – "There are approximately four lakh [400,000] raags in Hindustani Classical music. Many of them are repetitious but have different names."

Here, some of the raags and other types that are named are listed alphabetically. The following list includes raags, raaginis, upraags, Putra raags, raag's wives, Das raags, Dasi raags, Misra raags or Jod raags, etc.

== A ==
- Aadi (raga)
- Aadi Basant (Marwa Thaat)
- Aarabi (raga)
- Abhari (raagini)
- Abheri Todi
- Abhiri (raagini)
- Abhogi
- Abhogi Kanada
- Achob (raga)
- Adambari Kedar (raga)
- Adana (raga)
- Adana Bahar
- Adana Malhar
- Adbhut Kalyan (raga)
- Adbhut Ranjani
- Aghali (raga)
- Aghora Kauns
- Ahir Bhairav
- Ahimohini (raagini)
- Ahir Kanada
- Ahir Lalat
- Ahir Lalit
- Ahiri (raagini)
- Ahiri Malhar
- Ahiri Todi
- Ajad (raga)
- Ajad Hindol
- Alamgiri (raagini)
- Amba Manohari
- Ambika Sarang
- Amari (raagini)
- Amiri Kauns (Vachaspati aang)
- Amir Khani Kauns (Vachaspati aang)
- Amrith Kalyan
- Amritvarshini (raga)
- Ananda (raga's son)
- Ananda Bhairav
- Ananda Dhwani
- Ananda Leela
- Ananda Malhar
- Anandi (raagini)
- Anandi Bahar
- Anandi kedar
- Andhri (raga)
- Andiyali (raagini)
- Anjani Kalyan
- Anjani Todi
- Anuranjani
- Alhaiya
- Alhaiya Bilaval
- Annapurna
- Araj (raga)
- Arun Malhar
- Asa (raga)
- Asa Bhairav
- Asa Kafi
- Asa Maand
- Asa Todi
- Asa Asavari
- Asavari (Shuddh Rishabh Asavari)
- Asavari Todi (Komal Rishabh Asavari)
- Aslekhi (raagini)
- Averi Bhairavi
- Audav (raga)
- Audav Bhairav
- Audav Bilawal
- Audav Devgiri (raagini)
- Audav Dhannasri (raagini)
- Audav Gandhar
- Audav Girija
- Audav Kauns
- Audav Shuddha Kalyan

== B ==
- Badhans (raga)
- Badhamsa Sarang (Badhans Sarang)
- Bagkauns (raga)
- Bageshri / Bageshree
- Bageshri Bahar
- Bageshri Kanada
- Bageshri Kauns
- Bahaduri Todi
- Bahar
- Bahari Kedar
- Bairagi
- Bairagi Bhairav
- Bairagi Todi
- Bakul Bhairav
- Bakulabharan (raga)
- Ban (putra raga)
- Bangal (putra raga)
- Bangal Bhairav
- Bangal Bilawal
- Bangli (raagini)
- Barari (Marwa aang)
- Barari (Purvi aang)
- Barathi Todi
- Barhams Sarang
- Barahansika (raagini)
- Barwa (raga)
- Basant
- Basant Bahar
- Basant Pancham
- Basant Hindol
- Basant Kedar
- Basanta Mukhari
- Basanti (raagini)
- Basanti Kanada
- Basanti Kauns
- Basanti Kedar
- Bayati
- Bhairav
- Beehad (raga)
- Beehad Bhairav
- Bhairav Bahar
- Bhairav Bhatiyar
- Bhairavi
- Bhankhar
- Bhankhari
- Bhaskali
- Bhasker (putra raga)
- Bhatiyar (Marwa aang)
- Bhatiyar (Purvi aang)
- Bhatiyari (raagini)
- Bhatiyari Bhairav
- Bhatiyari Gauri
- Bhavmat (raga)
- Bhavmat Bhairav
- Bhav Kauns
- Bhavsakh
- Bhavsakh Kanada
- Bhavana pancham (upraga)
- Bhawani (raga)
- Bhawani Bahar
- Bhilalu
- Bhim (Kafi Thaat)
- Bhimsen
- Bhimpalasi
- Bhinna Bhairav
- Bhinna Kauns
- Bhinna Lalat
- Bhinna Rageshri
- Bhinna Shadja
- Bhookosh (raga)
- Bhora (putra raga)
- Bhup/Bhoopali
- Bhoopal (bhairav Thaat)
- Bhoopal Todi
- Bhoopeshwari
- Bhup Bilawal
- Bhup Kalyan
- Bhup Nat
- Bhupawali
- Bhupkali
- Bhuplai
- Bibhas (Marwa aang)
- Bibhas (Purvi aang)
- Bibhas (Bhairav aang)
- Bibhas (Deshkar aang)
- Bibhas Parbhati
- Bihag
- Bihag Maalva
- Bihag Nat
- Bihag Pat
- Bihag Savani
- Bihagada (with N)
- Bihagada (with n, N)
- Bihagara
- Bihari
- Bihagora (raga)
- Bihagora Maalva (raga)
- Bihari (raga)
- Bilaskhani Todi
- Bilawal
- Bilawal Dakhani
- Bilawal Gond
- Bilawal Kukubh
- Bilawal Malhar (mixture of ragas Gaud Malhar and Alhaiya Bilawal)
- Bilawal Nat
- Bilawal Shukla
- Bilawali (raagini)
- Bilahari (raga)
- Binoda (putra raga)
- Biradhar (putra raga)
- Birju ki Malhar
- Brindabani Sarang

== C ==
- Chaiti (raga)
- Chaiti Barwa
- Chaiti Bhup
- Chakradhar (raga)
- Chakravaak (raga)
- Chalnat
- Champak bilawal
- Champak (putra raga)
- Champakali
- Chand (putra raga)
- Chanchalsas Malhar
- Chandani (raga)
- Chandani Bihag
- Chandani Kalyan
- Chandani Kedar
- Chandra Bhairav
- Chandra Bhankar
- Chandra-Bimb (putra raga)
- Chandra Kalyan
- Chandradhwani
- Chandrakant (raga)
- Chandrakauns (Agra Gharana)
- Chandrakauns (Bageshree aang)
- Chandrakauns
- Chandramouli
- Chandranandan
- Chandraprabha
- Chandrika (raga)
- Charju ki Malhar
- Charukauns
- Charukesi
- Chhaya (raga)
- Chhaya bihag
- Chhaya Gaud Sarang
- Chhaya Hindol
- Chhaya Kalyan
- Chhaya Malhar
- Chhaya Tilak
- Chhayanat

== D ==
- Dadori
- Dagori
- Dakshina Gujjari (raga)
- Dakshinatya (raga)
- Daras Kauns (raga)
- Darbari
- Darbari Kanada
- Darbari Todi
- Daulati (raagini)
- Dayabati
- Deepak (Bilawal Thaat)
- Deepak Kedar
- Deepawali
- Deepranjani
- Deosakh
- Deogandhara (raga's son)
- Desaa Jaldhar (raga)
- Desaa Sawan (raga)
- Desaa Sorath (raga)
- Desh
- Desh Gaud
- Desh Jogi
- Desh Malhar
- Deshakhya (raga)
- Deshi (raagini)
- Desi Devgiri
- Deshi Tilang
- Desi Todi
- Deshkar (Purvi aang)
- Deshkar (Marwa aang)
- Deshkar
- Devadarshini
- Devangi
- Devkari (raagini)
- Dev Gandhar (raga) (Both Ga's in Jaunpuri)
- Dev Gandhar (Jogia aang)
- Dev Gandhar (Asavari aang)
- Devgaandhari (raagini)
- Devaranjani
- Devata Bhairav
- Devgiri Bilawal
- Devmaya
- Devkauns
- Devsag (raga)
- Devtirthi
- Dev Todi
- Dhakka (raga) (Komal Bhimpalasi)
- Dharmavati
- Dhan Basanti (Purvi aang)
- Dhanakoni Kalyan
- Dhanashri (raga)
- Dhanashri (Bhairavi aang)
- Dhanashri (Bilawal aang)
- Dhanashri (Kafi aang)
- Dhanashri (Khamaj aang)
- Dhanashri Multani
- Dhanawarchi Kalyan
- Dhani
- Dhanki
- Dhanikauns
- Dhanya Dhaivat
- Dhavalshree (raga)
- Dhulia Malhar
- Dhulia Sarang
- Dhumavati
- Din Ka Malkauns
- Divyagandhar
- Din ka Shankara
- Din ki Puriya (raagini)
- Din ki Puriya (Poorvi aang)
- Dishakh (putra raag)
- Divya Chandrika (created by Pt. Milind Date)
- Diwali (raagini)
- Dravida Gauda (raga)
- Dravida Gujjari (raga)
- Durga (raga)
- Durga (Bilawal Thaat)
- Durga (Khamaj Thaat)
- Durga Kalyan
- Durga Kedar
- Durgawati (raagini)
- Raga durgeshwai 1
- Durgeshwari 2
- Dwijavanthi

== E ==
- Enayatkhani Kanada
- Erukalakambhoji (raga)

== G ==
- Gagan Vihang (raga)
- Gajdhar (putra raga)
- Gambhir (raga)
- Gandhara (putra raga)
- Gandhari 1 (raagini)
- Gandhari 2 (raagini)
- Gandhari 3 (raagini)
- Gandhari Bahar
- Gandhakriya (raga)
- Gandhi Malhar
- Ganeshwari (raga)
- Gara (raga)
- Gara Bageshri
- Gara Kanada
- Gara Mand
- Gaud (raga)
- Gaud Bahar
- Gaud Bilawal
- Gaud Malhar
- Gaud Sarang
- Gaudgiri Bahar
- Gaudi (putra raga)
- Gaudi Bahar
- Gaudi Lalat
- Gaudi Malari (putra raga)
- Gaul (Bhairav Thaat)
- Gauri (raga)
- Gauri (Bhairav Thaat)
- Gauri (Kalingada aang) (2 Ma’s)
- Gauri (Marwa aang)
- Gauri (Poorvi aang)
- Gauri Bairagan
- Gauri Basant
- Gauri Chayti
- Gauri Cheti
- Gauri Dakhani
- Gauri Deepaki
- Gauri Guarairi
- Gauri Lalita
- Gauri Majh
- Gauri Mala
- Gauri Malva
- Gauri Purbi
- Gauri Purbi Deepaki
- Gauri Sorath
- Gaundkari (raagini)
- Gawati (raga)
- Girija Audav
- Girija Bhairav
- Girija Gandhar
- Girija Kauns
- Godagir (raagini)
- Gop Kamboji (Kafi Thaat)
- Gopika (raga)
- Gopika Basant
- Gorakh Kalyan
- Govardhani Todi
- Gound
- Gujjari (raagini)
- Guna Kalyan
- Guna Sagra
- Gunkiri (raagini)
- Gunguni (putra raga)
- Gunakali (raga)
- Gunakali (Bilawal Thaat)
- Gunakali (without Ma)
- Gunakali (without Ni)
- Gunakali Jogia
- Gunakali Utari (raga)
- Gunakree
- Gunaranjani
- Gund (putra raga)
- Gunji Kanada
- Gunjikauns
- Gurjri (raagini)
- Gurjari Todi
- Guru Kalyan
- Gyankali

== H ==
- Hameer
- Hameer Tarang
- Hameer Bahar
- Hameer Bilawal
- Hameer Kalyan
- Hameer Kedar
- Hameeri (raagini)
- Hameeri Bilawal
- Hamviri (raagini)
- Hamsadhvani
- Hamsa Kalyan
- Himala (raga's son)
- Hansanarayani (Purvi Thaat)
- Hanskinkini (raga)
- Haunsnad (raga)
- Hansvinod (raga)
- Harakh (putra raga)
- Harsha (raga's son)
- Harshsrungara
- Harasringara (raagini)
- Hari Bhairav (a raga created and tributed by Pt. Milind Date to his Guru Pandit Hariprasad Chaurasia)
- Hari Kauns (raga)
- Hari Mohini (a raga created and tributed by Pt. Milind Date to his Guru Pandit Hariprasad Chaurasia)
- Hari Priya (raga)
- Hasantrehta (raga)
- Hem Bihag
- Hem Kalyan
- Hem Lalat
- Hem Nat
- Hemshri (created by Pt. Acharya Vishwanath Rao Ringe 'Tanarang')
- Hemant (raga)
- Hemvati (raga)
- Hemvanti (raga)
- Hijaj (raga)
- Hijaj Bhairav
- Hindol
- Hindol Ajad (raga)
- Hindol Bahar
- Hindol Basant
- Hindol Dhwani
- Hindol Hem
- Hindol Kalyan
- Hindol Marg (raga)
- Hindol Pancham (raga)
- Hindoli (raagini)
- Hindolita (raagini)
- Homshikha (raga) (Khamaj Thaat)
- Hussaini Kanada 1
- Hussaini Kanada 2
- Hussaini Kanada 2
- Hussani Bhairav (a raga created and tributed by Pt. Milind Date to Ustad Zakir Hussain)
- Hussaini Bhairavi
- Hussani Todi

== I ==
- Iman (raga's son)
- Imratkauns
- Inayatkhani Kanada (created by Ustad Vilayat Khan)
- Indumati
- Indrasan

== J ==
- Jablidhar (putra raga)
- JaiKauns (raga)
- JaiRaj (Bilawal Thaat)
- Jaij Bilawal
- Jaimini (raga)
- Jaimini Kalyan
- Jait (Marwa Thaat)
- Jaitshri (raagini)
- Jait Kalyan
- Jaiwanti (Todi Thaat)
- Jaijaiwanti
- Jaijaiwanti (Bageshree aang)
- Jaijaiwanti (Sorath aang)
- Jaijaiwanti Kanada
- Jaijaiwanti Todi
- Jaldhara (putra raga)
- Jaladhar Basanti
- Jaladhar Desa
- Jaladhar Kedar
- Janasammohini
- Jangla Purvi
- Jangula (Asavari aang)
- Jaun (raga)
- Jaunkali
- Jaunpuri
- Jaunpuri Bahar
- Jaunpuri Todi
- Jayant (Kafi Thaat)
- Jayant Malhar (it is made up of ragas Jaijaiwanti and Malhar.)
- Jayant Kanada (it is made up of ragas Jaijaiwanti and Kanada.)
- Jayanti (raagini)
- Jaya
- Jayet
- Jetashree
- Jhanjh Malhar
- Jhinjhoti
- Jhinjhoti Misravanti
- Jhilla/Jilla (raga)
- Jog (raga)
- Jog Bahar
- Jog Tilang
- Jogeshwari (raga) (Kafi Thaat)
- Jogeshwari (raga) (Khamaj Thaat)
- Jogi (raga)
- Jogi Bhairavi
- Jogi Mand
- Jogia Kalingada
- Jogia
- Jogiya Asavari
- Jogkauns
- Jogwanti
- Joun Bhairav
- Jungala (raga)

== K ==
- Kaamaai (Khamaj Thaat)
- Kaamkesh (Khamaj Thaat)
- Kabir Bhairav 1
- Kabir Bhairav 2
- Kabiri (raagini)
- Kabiri Gauri
- Kachheli (raagini)
- Kafi
- Kafi Bahar
- Kafi Kanada
- Kafi Malhar
- Kagnat (raga)
- Kaisiki (raagini)
- Kakambheri (Bhairavi)
- Kakubha (raagini)
- Kala Bharan (Khamaj Thaat)
- Kalahans (raga)
- Kaalanka (putra raga)
- Kalaranjani
- Kalashree (created by Pt Bhimsen Joshi)
- Kalian (raga)
- Kalian Bhopali
- Kalinga (raga)
- Kalingada
- Kalyan
- Kalyani (raagini)
- Kamakshani (raagini)
- Kamal (putra raga)
- Kamal Shree
- Kamalaranjani
- Kamboji (raga)
- Kameshwari
- Kamkesh (raga)
- Kamod
- Kamod Nat
- Kamodi (raagini)
- Kamodwanti (raagini) (Khamaj Thaat)
- Kampili (raagini)
- Kanada (raga)
- Kanada Bageshri
- Kanada Bahar
- Kaanara (raga)
- Kannadi (raagini)
- Kanaraya (raga's son)
- Kanakanagi (raga)
- Kanmala (raga's son)
- Kanra
- Kanakanagi (Bhairav Thaat)
- Kausi
- Kausi Kanada (Nayaki aang)
- Kausi Kanada (it is a mixture of ragas Malkauns and Kanada)
- Kapar Gauri
- Kapi (raga) (Kafi Thaat)
- Karnati (raagini)
- Karnataka Bangala
- Karnataki (raagini)
- Kaushik (raga)
- Kaushikdwani (raga)
- Kaushiki (raagini)
- Kaushi Kanada
- Kaunsi Kanada (Nayaki aang)
- Kaunsi (Bhairavi Thaat)
- Kedar
- Kedar Bahar
- Kedar Bhairav
- Kedar Bhankar
- Kedar Mand
- Kedar Nand
- KedarNanda
- Kedari (raagini)
- Kedari Malhar
- Keki (raagini)
- Kesari Kalyan
- Khamaj
- Khamaj Bahar
- Khambavati (Khamaj Thaat)
- Khammaji Bhatiyar
- Khapar Gauri
- Khat (mixture of 6 ragas)
- Khat (Asavari Thaat)
- Khat Dhanashree
- Khat Todi
- Khem (raga) (Kalyan Thaat)
- Khem Kalyan
- Khemb (raga)
- Khemdhwan (raga)
- Khemnat (raga)
- Khokar
- Khokat (putra raga)
- Kiranranjani (raagini)
- Kirwani
- Klawanti
- Kohari Kalyan
- Kokabh (raga)
- Kokar (raag's son)
- Kokila Pancham (upraga)
- Kohal (raga) (Kafi Thaat)
- Kolahal (raga) (Bilawal Thaat)
- Kolhaas (raga) (Kafi Thaat)
- Komal Bageshri
- Komal Bhairav
- Komal Desi
- Komal Rishabh Asavari (raga)
- Kola (raga's son)
- Koumari (raagini) (Poorvi Thaat)
- Kripavati (raagini) (Asavari Thaat)
- Krishna Kalyan (raga)
- Krulanda (raga's son)
- Kukubh (raga)
- Kumbh (putra raga)
- Kumbhara (raga's son)
- Kumodini (raagini)
- Kunada (raga)
- Kuntal (putra raga)
- Kuranji (raga)
- Kusha (raga's son)
- Kusum (putra raga)

== L ==
- Lachari Kanada
- Lachari Todi
- Lachchasakh (raga)
- Lachhasas (raga)
- Lagan Gandhar
- Lajwanti (raagini)
- Lakshmi Kalyan
- Lakshmi Todi
- Lalat
- Lalat Bahar
- Lalat Pancham
- Lalit (putra raga)
- Lalit Bhatiyar
- Lalit Bilas
- Lalit Pancham
- Lalita (raagini)
- Lalita Gauri (Bhairav aang)
- Lalita Gauri (Poorvi aang)
- Lalita Sohani
- Lalitdhwani
- Lalitkali
- Lataangi (raga)
- Lankadahan Sarang (also known as Lankadahani Sarang)
- Lankeshri 1
- Lankeshri 2
- Lankeshri Kanada
- Lankeshwari
- Lom

== M ==
- Madha Kalyan
- Madhakauns
- Madhava (putra raga)
- Madhasuraja (raga)
- Madhu Ranjani
- Madhu (putra raga)
- Madhu Basant
- Madhukali
- Madhu Kalyan
- Madhu Malhar
- Madhu Malvi
- Madhu Sarang
- Madhu Saraswati
- Madhuwanti
- Madhukauns
- Madhumadh Sarang
- Madhumalati
- Madhumadhavi (raagini)
- Madhuranjani
- Madhusurawali
- Madhyamad Sarang
- Madhyamavati
- Mahathi
- Maharashtra Gujjari (raga)
- Majh (raga)
- Malashree
- Malavasri (raagini)
- Malani (Bhairavi Thaat)
- Malati Basant
- Malati Bihag
- Malati
- Malava
- Malavi (Marwa Thaat)
- Malavi (Purvi Thaat)
- Malawa Bihag
- Malawati
- Malayalam
- Malhar
- Malhari (raagini)
- Malgunji
- Maligaura (d)
- Maligaura (d, D)
- Malini Basant
- Malkauns
- Malkauns Bahar
- Malkauns Kanada
- Malkauns Pancham
- Maalva (raga)
- Malavi (raagini)
- Maluha Bihag
- Maluha Kalyan
- Maluha Kedar
- Maluha Mand
- Mallari (raagini)
- Manavi
- Mand Bhairav
- Mand Bhatiyar
- Mand
- Mangal Bhairav 1
- Mangal Bhairav 2
- Mangal Lalit
- Mangal Todi
- Mangaldhwani
- Mangalgujari
- Mangalan (putra raga)
- Mangeshi Todi (a raga created and tributed to Lata Mangeshkar, Asha Bhosale and Family by Pt. Milind Date)
- Mangiya Bhusani
- Manj Khamaj
- Manjha Khamaj
- Manjari
- Manjari Bihag
- Manjubhashini
- Marga Bihag
- Marg Hindol
- Maru (putra raga)
- Maru Basant
- Maru Bihag
- Maru Dakhani
- Maru Kalyan
- Maru Kafi
- Maru Kauns
- Maru Khamaj
- Maru Sarang
- Marwa
- Marwa Shree
- Medhavi
- Meghranji
- Mehkali
- Mewara (putra raga)
- Mayuri (raagini)
- Mirabai ki Malhar
- Mishra Bhairavi
- Mishra Bihag
- Mishra Desh
- Mishra Gara
- Mishra Jhinjhoti
- Mishra Jog
- Mishra Kafi
- Mishra Kalyan
- Mishra Khamaj
- Mishra Kirwani
- Mishra Mand
- Mishra Manjha
- Mishra Narayani
- Mishra Nat
- Mishra Pahadi
- Mishra Pilu
- Mishra Shankara
- Mishra Shivaranjani
- Mishra Todi
- Mitra
- Malhar (Some consider raga Malhar different from raga Malhar)
- Malhar
- Sarang (made up by the mixer of ragas Malhar and Brindabani Sarang)
- Todi
- Mod Malhar (made up by the mixer of ragas Kamod and Malhar)
- Mohankauns
- Mohini
- Motaki
- MotakiTodi
- Mrig Savani
- Mudrika Kanada
- Mudriki Kanada (raagini)
- Mugdha Chandrika (raga created by Pt. Milind Date)
- Mukthipradayini
- Multani
- Multani dhanashree
- Mustang (putra raga)

== N ==
- Nad (putra raga)
- Nada Kalyan
- Nadanamakriya (raga)
- Nagadhwani Kanada
- Naga Gandhar (upraga)
- Naga Pancham (upraga)
- Nagaswaravali
- Naiki Kanada
- Nanad
- Nand
- Nand Basant
- Nand Kauns
- Nand Kedar
- Nanak Malhar
- Narayani
- Narendra Kaunsa (a raga tributed to Shri Narendra Modi and created by Pt. Milind Date)
- Nat (putra raga)
- Nat Bhairav
- Nat Bihag
- Nat Bilawal
- Nat Kamod
- Nat Kedar
- Nat Malhar
- Nat Nagari
- Natachandra
- Natahams
- Natakpriya
- Natika (raagini)
- Natnarayan
- Natnarayani 1
- Natnarayani 2
- Nathmira (raagini)
- Narayani (raga)
- NavRanjani
- Nayaki Kanada
- Nepala (raga)
- Nepala Gauda (raga)
- Neelambari
- Nindiyari
- Niranjani Todi

== P ==
- Pahadi
- Palas
- Palas Kafi
- Palasi
- Pancha Jogeshwari
- Pancham (putra raga)
- Pancham (Basant aang)
- Pancham (Hindol aang)
- Pancham Malkauns
- Pancham Shadhav
- Pancham se Gara
- Parbal
- Parbhati
- Parbhati Bibhas
- Parbhati Dakhani
- Paraj
- Paraj Basant
- Paraj Kalingada
- Paraji Bhairav
- Parameshwari
- Pardesh
- Pat Bihag
- Pat Kafi
- Pat Ranjani
- Patdeepak
- Patmanjari 1
- Patmanjari 2
- Patmanjari 3
- Patdeep
- Phulashree
- Piloo
- Piloo Gara
- Piloo Ki Maanjh
- Pitambara
- Poorbya
- Prabhakali
- Prabhat
- Prabhat Bhairav
- Prabhati
- Prabhateshwari
- Pradeepaki
- Pratapvarali
- Priya Kalyan
- Punyaki
- Purabi Kalyan
- Purna Chandrakauns
- Purva
- Purva Kalyan
- Purvi Bihag
- Purvi Kedar
- Puriya Dhanashree
- Puriya Kalyan
- Pushpa Chandrika

== R ==
- Rageshri
- Rageshri Bahar
- Rageshri Kanada
- Rageshri Kauns
- Rageswari
- Rahi (raga)
- Raisa Kanada
- Raj Kalyan (raga)
- Raja Kalyan (raga)
- Rajani Kalyan (raga)
- Rama putra raga)
- Ram Gauri
- Ram Kalyan
- Ramanandi Gauri
- Ramkali
- Ramkali Dakhani
- Ramdasi Malhar
- Ramsakh
- Ramakiri (raagini)
- Rangeshwari
- Rasia (raga)
- Rasia Kanada
- Rasranjani Rasavati
- Rati (raga)
- Rati Bhairav
- Rativallabha (raga)
- Ravipriya (raga)
- Rayasa Kanada
- Revagupta (upraga)
- Rewa (Purvi aang)
- Rudhravati
- Rudra Pancham
- Rudra Ranjani
- Rupawati Kalyan
- Rupkali
- Rupmanjari Malhar

== S ==
- Sagara
- Sagera
- Sagra (putra raga)
- Sagunaranjani (raga)
- Sāhānā mallār
- Sahanki (raagini)
- Saheli todi
- Saindhava (raga's son)
- Saindhavi (raagini)
- Sajan (raga)
- Salagvarali
- Salu (putra raga)
- Samant Kalyan
- Samant Sarang
- Sampurna Bageshri
- Sampurna Bangala (raga's son)
- Sampurna Basakta (raga's son)
- Sampurna Bhairavi (raagini)
- Sampurna Bibhas
- Sampurna Gauda (raga's son)
- Sampurna Hindol
- Sampurna Kedar
- Sampurna Malkauns
- Sampurna Sarang
- Sampurna Ramkali (raagini)
- Sandhya
- Sandhya Shree
- Sanjani
- Sanjh Barari
- Sanjh Sarawali
- Sanjh Tarini
- Sanjh
- Sangam Kedar
- Santuri Todi
- Sar Nat
- Sarag (putra raga)
- Sarpada
- Sarang
- Sarang Kauns
- Sarangi (raagini)
- Saradi (putra raga)
- Sarasaangi (raga)
- Saraswati
- Saraswati Chandra
- Saraswati Kalyan
- Saraswati Kedar
- Saraswati Sarang
- Saravali (created by Ustad Vilayat Khan)
- Sarparda (raga)
- Sarparda Bilawal
- Salang
- Salang Sarang
- Sathanka (raga's son)
- Saurati (raagini)
- Savan (raga)
- Savan Desaa (raga)
- Savani 1
- Savani 2
- Savani Barwa
- Savani Bhatiyar
- Savani Bihag
- Savani Bilawal
- Savani Kalyan
- Savani Kedar
- Savani Nat
- Saveri (raagini)
- Saveri Todi
- Sazgiri
- Sehra (by Ustad Sultan Khan)
- Seehute (raagini)
- Shajda (raga)
- Shadjandhri (raga)
- Shahana
- Shahana Bahar
- Shahana Kanada
- Shaktilak (upraga)
- Shamvati
- Shankara
- Shankara Bihag
- Shankara Kalyan
- Sharada
- Shiv (raga)
- Shiv Abhogi
- Shiv Bhairav
- Shivdhaam
- Shiv Kalyan (made up by the mixer of ragas Shivaranjani and Aman)
- Shiv Kauns
- Shiv Kedar
- Shivari (raagini)
- Shivmat Bhairav
- Shivaranjani
- Shiv Todi
- Shobhavari
- Shree
- Shree Kalyan 1
- Shree Kalyan 2
- Shreetanki
- Shubh Kalyan
- Shuddha (raga)
- Shuddha Bahar
- Shuddha Barari
- Shuddha Basant
- Shuddha Bhairavi
- Shuddha Bihag
- Shuddha Bilawal
- Shuddha Dhanashree
- Shuddha Desi
- Shuddha Kafi
- Shuddha Kalyan
- Shuddha Kedar
- Shuddha Lalat
- Shuddha Malhar (Bilawal Thaat)
- Shuddha Malu
- Shuddha Nat
- Shuddha Nishad Bageshri
- Shuddha Sarang
- Shuddha Sarangi
- Shuddha Shyam
- Shuddha Todi
- Shukla (raga)
- Shukla Bilawal
- Shyam (putra raga)
- Shyam Kalyan 1
- Shyam Kalyan 2
- Shyam Kalyan
- Shyam Kauns
- Shyam Kedar
- Shyam Sarang
- Shyam Shree
- Simhendramadhyam
- Sindh (raga)
- Sindhimallari (raga)
- Sindhavi Asavari (raagini)
- Sindhava
- Sindhu Bahar
- Sindhu Bhairav
- Sindhu Bhairavi
- Sindhura
- Sindhura Bahar
- Sindhura Kafi
- Sindhuri (raagini)
- Sohani
- Sohani Bhatiyar
- Sohani Pancham
- Soma (raga)
- Sooha (raga)
- Sorati (raagini)
- Sorath
- Sorath Desaa (raga)
- Sorath Malhar
- Sorathi (raga's son's wife)
- Sourashtra (raga)
- Sourashtra Bhairav
- Sourashtra Gujjari
- Siri Raag
- Srirangapriya
- Subah Ki Malavi (Marwa Thaat)
- Sugandh (raga)
- Sugharai
- Sugharai Kanada
- Suha (raga)
- Suha Adana
- Suha Kanada
- Suha Malhar
- Suha Sughrai
- Suha Sugharai Kanada (raga)
- Suha Todi
- Suhi (raga)
- Suhi Kafi
- Suhi lalit
- Suho/Suhai
- Sujani Malhar
- Sukhiya (raga)
- Sukhiya Bilawal
- Sukul Bilawal
- Sunand Bhairav (created by Pt. Milind Date)
- Sunand Sarang (created by Pt. Milind Date)
- Sundar Kali (raga)
- Sundar Kauns (raga)
- Sur Malhar
- Surdasi Malhar
- Suryakant (raga)
- Surya Kauns (raga)
- Surmanand (putra raga)
- Swanandi (raagini)
- Swarparda (raga)

== T ==
- Takkasaindhav (upraga)
- Tanka (raagini)
- Tanseni Madhuwanti
- Tappa Khamaj
- Telangi (raagini)
- Telugu Kambhoji (raga)
- Thumari (raga)
- Thyagaraja Mangalam
- Tilak Bihag
- Tilak Des
- Tilak Kamod
- Tilak Kedar
- Tilak Malhar
- Tilak Shyam
- Tilaki Sarang
- Tirbhukti
- Tilang
- Tilang Bahar
- Tilang Kafi
- Timbanki
- Tivrakallyan
- Todi
- Todi Abheri
- Todi Ahiri
- Todika (raagini)
- Triveni
- Triveni Gauri
- Tukhari
- Tulsikauns (raa)
- Turushka Gauda (raga)
- Turushka Todi (raga)

== U ==
- Udan (raga)
- Udan Chandrika (Kafi Thaat)
- Udan Kanta (Khamaj Thaat)
- Udasi (raga)
- Udasi Bhairav (Bhairav Thaat)
- Uday (raga)
- Uday Chandrika (Asavari Thaat) (created by Pt. Milind Date)
- Uday Ravi (Bilawal Thaat)
- Uma Tilak (Khamaj Thaat)
- Ushhaak (raga made from shades of 3 ragas Sarang, Asavari and Bhairav)
- Utara Kalyan (raga)
- Utari (raga)
- Utari Basant
- Utari Gunakali

== V ==
- Vachspati
- Vada Hamsa (raga's son's wife)
- Vadhans
- Vadhans Dakhani
- Vanka (raagini)
- Varati (raagini)
- Vardhani
- Varorji
- Vasanta
- Vasanta Carnatic
- Vasanta Mukhari
- Vasanti (raagini)
- Vaya (dasi raagini)
- Velaval (raga's son)
- Velavali (raagini)
- Vibhas
- Vibhavari
- Vibhasaka
- Vidhyavati
- Vihang
- Vigiswari (dasi raagini)
- Vijayaranjani
- Vikram Bhairav
- Vilolika (raagini)
- Vinod
- Virat Bhairav
- Virari (raagini)
- Viyogvarali
- Vrindavani Sarang (it is also called as Brindabani Sarang.)
- Vyjayanti (raagini)

== Y ==
- Yaman
- Yaman Kalyan
- Yamani (raagini)
- Yamani Basant
- Yamani Bilawal
- Yamani Hindol
- Yashowati

== Z ==
- Zeelaf (raga)
- Zeelaf (Asavari Thaat)
- Zeelaf (Bhairav aang)
- Zilla (raga)
- Zilla Kafi (raga)
- Zim Kalyan (created by Pt. Milind Date)

== See also ==
- List of composers who created ragas
- Carnatic raga
  - List of Janya ragas
  - List of Melakarta Ragas
