= Malgunji =

Hindustani raga

Raga Malgunji
- Thaat: Khamaj or Kafi
- Time of day: 3rd Prahar of the night
- Arohana: S G m D n S
- Avarohana: S' n D P m G R G m g R S
- Pakad: G m g R S n S D n S G m
- Vadi: Ma
- Samavadi: Sa
- Similar: Bageshree; Rageshree

Raga Malgunji is a Hindustani classical raga from the Khamaj Thaat. Some consider it is a part of the Kafi Thaat too.

== Theory ==
Malgunji is a mixture of Khamaj, Bageshree, Rageshwari and Jaijaiwanti ragas. Raga Malgunji is similar to Raag Bageshree but it employs Shuddha Gandhar in Aaroh which makes it different from Bageshree. Malgunji also has some elements of Raga Khamaj. This Raag employs Shuddha Gandhar in Aaroh and Komal Gandhar in Avroh. Raga Vachak notes of Raag Malgunji are S, D, n S G, R G m which are recurring. Shuddha Gāndhāra is a Prominent note. Vadi is Madhyama and Samavadi is Ṣaḍja. This Raga can be expanded in all the three octaves. This Raga creates a heavy atmosphere.

Svaras

The Svaras in the raga are,

Panchama Varjyit in the Aaroh. Both Nishads, Both Gāndhāras. Rest all Shuddha Svaras.

Arohana & Avarohana

Arohana

S G m D n S

Avarohana

S' n D P m G R G m g R S

Vadi & Samavadi

Vadi: Madhyama (Ma)

Samavadi: Ṣaḍja (Sa)

Pakad or Chalan

G m g R S n S D n S G m

Relationships Related ragas: Bageshree and Rageshree. Thaat: Khamaj

== Behavior ==
Behavior refers to practical aspects of the music. In Hindustani music many of the concepts are fluid, changing, or archaic. The following information reflects how the music once existed.

The raga is generally performed during the hours form 3rd Prahar of the night. Some say that the time is 9 am to 12 pm.

Certain ragas have seasonal associations.
