= Gorakh Kalyan =

- Thaat: Khamaj
- Time of day: Early night, 9–12
- Arohana: S R M D (Ṇ) D Ṡ
- Avarohana: Ṡ N D P M R S Ṇ Ḍ S
- Vadi: Ma
- Samavadi: Sa
- Synonym: Gorakh
- Similar: Durga; Bageshri

Gorakh Kalyan is a raga in Hindustani classical music. Its name is attributed to its origins in a regional type of song of Gorakhpur in Uttar Pradesh. Since it does not resemble Kalyan very much, some musicians prefer to just call it Gorakh.
