= Desi (raga) =

Hindustani classical raga

- Thaat: Kafi / Asavari
- Time of day: Second prahara (Late morning, 9–12)
- Synonym: Deshi; Deshi Todi; Deshkari
- Similar: Barwa

Desi (Hindi देसी or देशी) is a Hindustani classical raga. This raga may be affiliated with the Asavari thaat or with the Kafi thaat depending on the way of presentation. It is similar to raga Barwa.

== Film songs ==
Song	Movie	Composer	Artists
Aaj Gaavat Man Mero Jhumke	Baiju Bawra (film)	Naushad	D. V. Paluskar & Amir Khan (singer)

Song	Movie	Composer	Artists
O Sakhi Oho Cheli Oho madiya mohini	Jagadeka Veeruni Katha	Pendyala (composer)	Ghantasala (musician)
Tirumala Tirupati Venkateswara	Mahamantri Timmarusu (film)	Pendyala (composer)	S. Varalakshmi & P. Susheela
Momu chooda veduka gomu chooda	Bhaktha Sabari	Pendyala (composer)	
Annee manchi sakunamule	Sri Krishnarjuna Yuddhamu	Pendyala (composer)	Ghantasala (musician) & P. Susheela
Enta dooramo adi enta dooramo	Ekaveera	K. V. Mahadevan	P. Susheela
Aligina velane chudali gokula krishnuni andalu	Gundamma Katha	Ghantasala (musician)	P. Susheela
Venuganaloluni gana veyi kannulu	Rendu Kutumbala katha(1970 film)	Ghantasala (musician)	P. Susheela
Vardhillu maa talli vardhillavamma	Mayabazar	Ghantasala (musician)	P. Leela & Chorus
