= Sindhura =

- Thaat: Kafi
- Type: Audava–Sampurna
- Arohana: S R M̄ P D Ṡ
- Avarohana: Ṡ Ṉ D P M G̱ R S
- Vadi: S
- Samavadi: P
- Synonym: Sindhoḍā; Saindhvi; Sindhvi
- Similar: Kafi; Barwa

Sindhura is a raga in Hindustani classical music.

== Theory ==
Arohana: S R M̄ P D Ṡ (Note: Alternate notations: Carnatic: S R₂ M₂ P D₂ Ṡ; Western: C D F♯ G A C)

Avarohana: Ṡ Ṉ D P M G̱ R S (Note: Alternate notations: Carnatic: Ṡ N₂ D₂ P M₁ G₂ R₂ S; Western: C B♭ A G F E♭ D C)

Vadi: S

Samavadi: P

== Sources ==
- Sindhurā Rāga (Hin), The Oxford Encyclopaedia of the Music of India. Oxford University Press. ISBN 9780195650983.
