= Madhuranjani =

Hindustani raga

- Thaat: Kafi
- Time of day: Night (First Pehar)
- Arohana: 'N S g m P N S
- Avarohana: S' N P m g S
- Vadi: Pa
- Samavadi: Sa
- Equivalent: Srotaswini
- Similar: Srotaswini; Patdeep; Gourimanohari; Udayaravichandrika; Madhuvanti

Madhuranjani (मधुरंजनी) or Madhu Ranjani, is a Hindustani classical raga from the Kafi Thaat. It is an Audav-Audav raag, (means pentatonic in ascending and descending scale). Madhuranjani is equivalent to raag Shrotasvini or Udayaravichandrika of Carnatic music. Raag Madhuranjani is formed when shudh Ni is taken instead of komal ni and omitting Ri in Raag Dhani. Some musicians also use rag Madhuvanthi in ascending and rag Shivranjini in descending for this raag. It is also similar to Patdeep if Dha and Ri is omitted. It is said to have been adopted from Carnatic raga Srotaswini. There is another combination of swaras to sing this raga where Ni komal of Kafi is also added.

== Theory ==
=== Aroha and Avaroha ===
Notation: S g G m P N S

Lower case indicates 'komal Swar' or flat notes, " indicates higher (third) octave, ' indicates lower (first) octave

note

- Aroha: N' S g m P N S'
- Avaroha: S" N P, m P g, m g S

The raag Madhuranjani has swara Komal Ga. It is an Audava-Audava raag, implying that it has 5 notes in Aroh and Avaroh. Raag Madhuranjani is formed when shudh Ni is taken instead of komal n in Raag Dhani and Ri is omitted. Madhuranjani is equivalent to raag Shrotasvini of Carnatic music. some musicians also use rag Madhuvanthi in ascending and rag Shivranjini in avroh for this raag. It is sung in Night First Pehar in Hindustani music

=== Vadi and Samavadi ===
- Vadi: Pa
- Samavadi: Sa

=== Pakad or Chalan ===
- Pakad or Chalan: N' S g M P g, M g S N', g M P N S", M P g, g S N'.

== Bandish Examples ==
Bandish is a composition in Hindustani classical music. Few examples of banishes and compositions in Raag Madhuranjani

- Pt. Jitendra Abhisheki performed in Mumbai Doordarshan in 1980
- Pt. Sharad Sutaone Madhlyalay Ektal Bandish
- Sawani Shende Dhruth Teentaal Bandish
- Pt. Ustaad Rashid Khan

== See also ==
- List of ragas in Hindustani classical music
- List of composers who created ragas
