= Hameer =

Hindustani raga

- Thaat: Kalyan
- Time of day: Early night, 9–12
- Arohana: S G M D N Ṡ
- Avarohana: Ṡ N D P M̄ P G M R S
- Vadi: Dha
- Samavadi: Ga
- Synonym: Hambir; Hameer; Hameer Kalyan
- Similar: Kamod, Kedar, Gaud Sarang, Chhayanat

Hameer is a nocturnal Hindustani classical raga nominally placed in Kalyan thaat. All the (shuddha swaras (natural notes) along with (teevra madhyam are used in it. Generally, its vaadi swar (the most used, principal note of a raga on which a pause may be taken) is dhaivat and the samavaadi swar (the second-most used important note assisting the vaadi swar) is gandhar. However, some exponents consider the vaadi swar to be pancham (G natural) as Hameer is mainly sung in the upper half of an octave and is nocturnal. Pancham is not taken in the aaroh but is taken in avroh. Its jati is "Sampurn Sampurn". "Vadi Svar" is Dhaivat (Dh) and Samvadi Swar is Gandhar.

The Carnatic raaga named Hameer Kalyani is similar to Hindusthani raag Kedar, not to Hindusthani Hamir. Carnatic music also has a separate raaga named Kedaram. As it happens, the Hindusthani raagas Kedar, Kamod and Hameer have fairly strong genetic overlap; in Kedar, madhyama is prominent; in Kamod it is Pancham; and in Hameer it is dhaivat which is most dominant.

== Ascent and descent ==
In the ascent, all natural notes are used, sometimes adding F#. In the descent, both of the madhyamas are used. A feature during the descent is the series of swaras 'Pa ga ma re sa' (G E F D C). At times, Komal Nishad (ni) (B flat) is also used as in "Dha ni Pa" during the descent. The general ascent and descent of the notes is:

                  Sa Re Sa, Ga Ma Dha, Ni Dha Sa
                  C  D  C, E  F  A, B  A   C

                  Sa Ni Dha Pa, ma Pa Dha Pa, Ga Ma Re Sa
                  C  B  A   G, F# G  A   G, E  F  D  C

Scholars do not permit the use of teevra madhyam in this raga and consider it to have emanated from Bilaval. But today the F# has become part of the raga. A special characteristic feature of this raga is the specific way in which the dhaivat (dha) is sung or played with a touch of upper nishad (ni) at the beginning.

== Organization and relationships ==
=== Samay (time) ===
The time to sing this raga is 2nd prahar of night i.e. 9:00pm–12:00am.

== Film Songs ==
=== Tamil ===
Song	Movie	Composer	Singer
En Uyir Thozhi	Karnan	Viswanathan–Ramamoorthy	P. Susheela
Udaluku Uyir Kaaval	Manapanthal	Viswanathan–Ramamoorthy	P. B. Sreenivas
Kannizhantha	Enippadigal	K. V. Mahadevan	P. Susheela
Chandrodayam Oru Pennanatho	Chandhrodhayam	M. S. Viswanathan	T. M. Soundararajan, P. Susheela
Vellaikkamalathiley	Gowri Kalyanam	M. S. Viswanathan	Soolamangalam Rajalakshmi
Kaaluku Keezhe Naluvuthu	Silambu	M. S. Viswanathan	K. S. Chitra
Netru parthatho	En Kanavar	S. P. Venkatesh	K. S. Chitra
Yeriyile Oru Kashmir Roja (Ragamalika:Kedar/Hamirkalyani, Valaji)	Madhanamaaligai	M. B. Sreenivasan	P. Suseela, K. J. Yesudas
Devi Vantha Neram	Vandichakkaram	Shankar–Ganesh	S. P. Balasubrahmanyam, Vani Jairam
Kaiyil Veenai	Vietnam Colony	Ilaiyaraaja	Bombay Jayashree
Inimel Naalum	Iravu Pookkal	Ilaiyaraaja	S. Janaki
Manasukkul	Kalyana Agathigal	V. S. Narasimhan	Raj Sitaraman, P. Susheela
Nila Kaikiradhu	Indira	A. R. Rahman	Hariharan, Harini
Malargale Malargale (Shades of Sarawathi and Hamirkalyani)	Love Birds	A. R. Rahman	K. S. Chitra, Hariharan
Swasame Swasame (Ragamalika:Kedar/Hamirkalyani, Maand)	Thenali	A. R. Rahman	S. P. Balasubrahmanyam, Sadhana Sargam
Kanava Illai Kaatra	Ratchagan	A. R. Rahman	Srinivas
Murali Mogha	Galatta Kalyanam	A. R. Rahman	Haricharan, K. S. Chitra
Iruvathu Vayathu Varai	Kannodu Kanbathellam	Deva	Hariharan, S. Janaki
Pirivellam	Soori	Deva	Harish Raghavendra, Chinmayi

=== Language:Hindi ===
- The song 'duniyaa hammare pyaar kii', from film Lahore (1949), sung by Karan Diwan and Lata Mangeshkar, and composed by Shyam Sunder, is set to Hameer.
- The song from the movie Kohinoor, 'Madhuban mein Radhika Nachi re' is composed in the Hameer raga.
- Vasant Prabhu had a composed a song 'gaa re kokila, gaa', for Marathi film Baayakochaa Bhaauu, set to Hameer, sung by Asha Bhosle.
