= Asa (raga) =

Raga of Gurmat Sangeet Tradition

- Thaat: Bilaval
- Type: Audava-Sampurna
- Time of day: Evening
- Vadi: Ma
- Samavadi: Sa

Raga Asa is a Sikh raga (composition) that emerged in the Sikh tradition from Punjab. It is part of the Gurmat Sangeet musical tradition, which includes ragas used by Sikh Gurus for Gurbani. It is used in the Guru Granth Sahib, the Sikh holy scripture. It is not used in other Indian traditions. "Majh Khamaj" raga appears in Hindustani Sangeet, but it does not resemble the Asa of Gurmat Sangeet. "Asa" is part of the daily prayers conducted in Sikh Gurdwaras. In composing a tune, every raga follows rules that govern the number of notes that can be used, which notes can be used, and their interplay.

In the Guru Granth Sahib, the Sikh holy Granth (book), 60 ragas appear and are of equal and independent status. Numerous Shabad Reet compositions base based on these ragas are popular in the tradition. The Gurbani hymns under raga Asa appear in Sri Guru Granth Sahib.

Asa offers emotions of inspiration and courage. This raga gives the listener the determination and ambition to put aside any excuses and to proceed with necessary actions to achieve the aim. It generates feelings of passion and zeal to succeed, and the energy generated from these feelings enables the listener to find the strength to achieve success. The determined mood of this raga motivates the listener to be inspired.

Asa appeared during the 16th century. It was introduced in the classical singing styles of Gurmat Sangeet by Guru Nanak Dev Ji, the founder of Sikhism. The raga originated from popular folk tunes of Punjab (northern India). Raga Asa belongs to Bilawal Thaat. Asa was used by Guru Nanak, Guru Angad, Guru Amar Das, Guru Ram Das, Guru Arjan and Guru Tegh Bahadur.

== Notes ==
The order of notes that can be used on the ascending and descending phase of the composition and the primary and secondary notes are:

- Aroh: S R M P D Ṡ
- Avroh: Ṡ N D P M G R S
- Vadi: Ma
- Samvadi: Sa
- Thaat : Bilaval
- Jaati : Audava – Sampurna
- Resting notes : Avroha ga, ni
- Time : Evening

Asa is a crooked (vakra) raga requiring approaches to certain notes be made from a set position. Its variants, as given in the Guru Granth Sahib, are Kafi and Asavari, both of which have many features in common with Asa.

== See also ==
- Kirtan
- Raga
- Taal
