= Chhayanat (raga) =

Raga in Hindustani classical music

- Thaat: Kalyan
- Type: Sampurna
- Time of day: Early night, 9–12
- Arohana: SRGMPDNS'
- Avarohana: S'NDPMGRS
- Chalan: S, RGMP, P–>R, RG, GM, M R, S S, D’ n’ P’, P’ S, N’ S (G)R, R G M D, D P P–>R G M R S, S R, R G, R G M n D P, PDPP S” S” (N)R” S”, D P M, G M n D P–>R, R G, G M R S S S M G P, DNS”, S” D P–>R, GMP G M R S[1]
- Vadi: P
- Samavadi: R
- Synonym: Chayanat; Chhayanut
- Similar: Gaud Sarang; Kamod

Chhayanat Chāyānaṭ ("shadow or glimpse of Nat") is a raga in Hindustani classical music.

== Technical description ==
Chhayanat is a very popular raag whereas its constituent "Chhaya" and "Nat" are rarely sung anymore. Its distinctive phrases P->R and P->S' set it apart from the related Kamod, Kedar, Alhaiya Bilaval and Hameer.

== Samay ==
Chhayanat is an evening raag, and is sung during the second "prahar" 9PM-12AM.
