= Kafi (raga) =

Hindustani raga

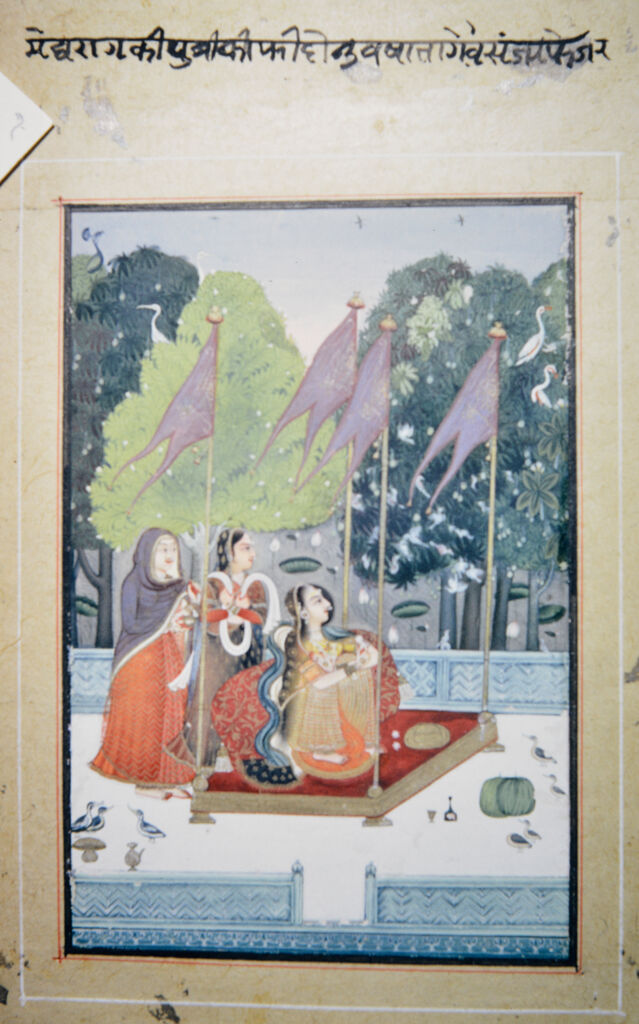
- Thaat: Kafi
- Type: Sampurna
- Time of day: 2nd Prahar of the Night (9 p.m. - 12 a.m.)
- Arohana: S R g m P D n S'
- Avarohana: S' n D P m g R S
- Pakad: S R g m P D n S' S' n D P m g R S
- Chalan: S R g m P D n S' S' n D P m g R S
- Vadi: Pa
- Samavadi: Re
- Synonym: Bhimpalasi, Bageshri
- Similar: Kharaharapriya in Carnatic music and Dorian mode in Western music

Kafi (IAST: Kāfi) is a raga in Hindustani classical music. It corresponds to Kharaharapriya in Carnatic music and Dorian mode in Western music.

Vishnu Narayan Bhatkhande classified most ragas into ten Thaats. Kafi Thaat is one of them. The raga Kafi is the principal raga of its Thaat. According to Bhatkhande, its name first appears in the Raga Tarangini of Lochana Pandit, who lived in the Mithila district around the 15th century CE.

Kafi has a direct lineage with the folk music of India. Folk music in Tappa, Hori, Dadra, Kirtan and Bhajans from different parts of India have been composed in this raga.

Many variations of Kafi exist. Contamination with vivadi swaras is common. This mixing has given rise to Mishra Kafi. Hence, a pure form of Kafi is seldom heard.

== Description ==
=== Varna ===
Kafi is a sampoorna-sampoorna or heptatonic raga, with komal (half a note down) Gandhar (ga) and Nishad (ni). This is also referred to as the Bhairavi of night. Both Shuddha Nishad & Gandhar are occasionally used. The atmosphere created is most suitable for both types of Shringar (Separation & Union) and hence many Thumri & Hori compositions are sung in this Raag.

=== Aroha ===
Sa Re Ga Ma Pa Dha Ni Ṡa

(Ga and Ni are komal swaras). Dot above signifies the high octave, dot below signifies the low octave.

=== Avarohana ===
Ṡa Ni Dha Pa Ma Ga Re Sa

(Ga and Ni are komal swaras).

=== Vadi and Samavadi ===
Pancham (Pa) is the vadi swara and Risabh (Re) is the samavadi swara.

=== Pakad ===
A typical improvisation of Kafi starts as M P D P M g R, g R S, n. D. S

The phrases below and termination in R are characteristic.

S R g M P D n

S, R g M P, M P D (M) g

=== Chalan ===
The typical chalan can be illustrated as:

S S R R g g M M P - - D M P g R R n D n P D M P S n D P M G R S.

M P D D n S - S R g R S N D S - S R S n D n D P M P D P g - R - R n D n P D M P S n D P M g R S

== Variants ==
- Shuddha Kafi
- Sindhura Kafi
- Zilaf Kafi
- Kafi Kanada

== Organization and relationships ==
Various ragas, such as Bhimpalasi, Bageshree, Kafi Kanada, Bahar, and Brindabani Sarang are associated with this raga. Important tributaries of this raga include Sindhura, Barwa, Deshi, Neelambari and Pilu.

In Western Classical Music, Kafi corresponds to the modern Dorian Mode.

== Behavior ==
=== Samay (Time) ===
Raat ka dvitiya prahar or evening 9–12

=== Seasonality ===
The raga is performed during any season.

== Important recordings ==
- Ulhas Kashalkar, Raga Kafi (Concert), 2001;
- Shobha Gurtu, Thumri, Raga Kafi, 1987;
- Siddheshwari Devi, Thumri, Raga Kafi, 1983;
- Debashish Bhattacharya, Raga Mishra Kafi, 1996;
- Ustad Bahadur Khan, Raga Kafi, 1987;

== Film Songs ==
=== Language:Hindi ===
Song	Movie	Year	Composer	Singer
Chupke Chupke Raat Din (Traditional Ghazal)	Nikaah	1982	Ravi	Ustad Ghulam Ali
Ye Pyar Kya Hai (From "Gupt")	Gupt	1997	Viju Shah	Kumar Sanu, Alka Yagnik, Kavita Krishnamurthy
Tanha Dil Tanha Safar (has mixes of Bhimpalasi as well)	Tanha Dil (album)	2000	Shaan, Ram Sampath	Shaan
Sab Kuchh Bhula Diya	Hum Tumhare Hain Sanam	2002	Bali Brahmbhatt	Sonu Nigam, Sapna Awasthi
Saathiya (reused from "Pachchai Nirame")	Saathiya	2002	A R Rahman	Sonu Nigam, Clinton Cerejo
Titli (Starts with Carnatic Song in Raga Desh)	Chennai Express	2013	Vishal-Shekhar	Chinmayi Sripada, Gopi Sunder
Jiya (Mix of Kafi and Bhimpalas)	Gunday	2014	Sohail Sen	Arijit Singh
Mard Maratha (From "Panipat") (has Mix of Kafi and Bhimpalas)	Panipat	2019	Ajay-Atul	Ajay–Atul, Sudesh Bhosle, Kunal Ganjawala, Swapnil Bandodkar, Padmanabh Gaikwad, Priyanka Barve
Lutt Le Gaya	Dhurandhar	2025	Shashwat Sachdev	Simran Choudhary, Shashwat Sachdev

=== Language:Tamil ===
Note that the following songs are composed in Kharaharapriya, the equivalent of raga Kafi in Carnatic music.

Song	Movie	Composer	Singer
Enna Seidhaalum	Irumbu Thirai	S. V. Venkatraman	Radha Jayalakshmi
Ariyaa Paruvamadaa	Missiamma	S. Rajeshwara Rao	P. Susheela
Maayavalaiyil	Gulebakavali	Viswanathan–Ramamoorthy	T. M. Soundararajan
Annan Kaatiya Vazhiyamma	Padithal Mattum Podhuma	Viswanathan–Ramamoorthy	T. M. Soundararajan
Maharajan	Karnan	Viswanathan–Ramamoorthy	T. M. Soundararajan, P. Susheela
Aagaya Pandhalile	Ponnunjal	M. S. Viswanathan	T. M. Soundararajan, P. Susheela
Madhavi Pon Mayilaal	Iru Malargal	M. S. Viswanathan	T. M. Soundararajan
Ponmagal Vandhaal	Sorgam	M. S. Viswanathan	T. M. Soundararajan
Attamenna Solladi (I will sing for you)	Manidharil Manikkam	M. S. Viswanathan	T. M. Soundararajan
Malligai En Mannan	Dheerga Sumangali	M. S. Viswanathan	Vani Jayaram
Aayiram Nilave Vaa	Adimai Penn	K. V. Mahadevan	S. P. Balasubrahmanyam, P. Susheela
Isaiyai Thamizhai	Agathiyar	Kunnakudi Vaidyanathan	Sirkazhi Govindarajan, T. R. Mahalingam
Poo Malarinthida	Tik Tik Tik	Ilaiyaraaja	K. J. Yesudas, Jency Anthony
Thaana Vantha Santhaname	Ooru Vittu Ooru Vanthu	Ilaiyaraaja	S. P. Balasubrahmanyam, S. Janaki
Vaazhavaikum Kaathalukku Jey	Apoorva Sagodharargal	Ilaiyaraaja	S. P. Balasubrahmanyam, S. Janaki
Adukku Malli Yeduthu	Aavarampoo	Ilaiyaraaja	S. P. Balasubrahmanyam, S. Janaki
Pattu Onna	Kumbakarai Thangaiah	Ilaiyaraaja	S. P. Balasubrahmanyam, S. Janaki
Mappillaikku	Netrikkan	Ilaiyaraaja	Malaysia Vasudevan, P. Susheela
Kannukkulle Yaaro	Kai Kodukkum Kai	Ilaiyaraaja	S. P. Sailaja, P. Susheela
Maalai Karukkalil	Neethiyin Marupakkam	Ilaiyaraaja	K. J. Yesudas, S. Janaki
Roja Poo Adivanthathu	Agni Natchathiram	Ilaiyaraaja	S. Janaki
Karutha Machan	Pudhu Nellu Pudhu Naathu	Ilaiyaraaja	S. Janaki
Iravu Nilavu	Anjali	Ilaiyaraaja	S. Janaki
Kaala kaalamaaga Vaazhum	Punnagai Mannan	Ilaiyaraaja	S. P. Balasubrahmanyam, K.S. Chitra
Aethamayya Aetham	Ninaive Oru Sangeetham	Ilaiyaraaja	Malaysia Vasudevan, K.S. Chitra
Ilam Vayasu Ponna	Paandi Nattu Thangam	Ilaiyaraaja	Malaysia Vasudevan, K.S. Chitra
Nethu Oruthara Oruthara	Puthu Paatu	Ilaiyaraaja	Ilaiyaraaja, K.S. Chitra
Poongatru Thirumbuma	Muthal Mariyathai	Ilaiyaraaja	Malaysia Vasudevan, S. Janaki
Katti Vechukko Enthan Anbu Manasu	En Jeevan Paduthu	Ilaiyaraaja	Malaysia Vasudevan, S. Janaki
Anandham Pongida Pongida	Sirai Paravai	Ilaiyaraaja	K. J. Yesudas, Sunanda
Thooliyile Ada Vantha	Chinna Thambi	Ilaiyaraaja	Mano, K.S. Chitra
Unnai Vaazhtha Vanthen	Unnai Vaazhthi Paadugiren	Ilaiyaraaja	K. J. Yesudas
Elangaathu Veesudhey	Pithamagan	Ilaiyaraaja	Sriram Parthasarathy, Shreya Ghoshal
Kai Veesi	Nandalala	Ilaiyaraaja	Vijay Yesudas, Swetha Mohan, Madhu Balakrishnan, Raagul, Chandrasekar
Ilavenirkala Panjami	Manam Virumbuthe Unnai	Ilaiyaraaja	Hariharan
Aanenna Pennena	Dharma Durai	Ilaiyaraaja	S. P. Balasubrahmanyam
Neela Vana Odayil	Vazhvey Maayam	Gangai Amaran	S. P. Balasubrahmanyam
Indralogathu Sundari	Uyirullavarai Usha	T. Rajendar	S. P. Balasubrahmanyam
Atho Vanile Nila Oorvalam	Thandanai	Chandrabose	S. P. Balasubrahmanyam, S. Janaki
Pachchai Nirame (Sakiye)	Alaipayuthey	A. R. Rahman	Hariharan, Clinton Cerejo
Urvasi Urvasi	Kaadhalan	A. R. Rahman	A. R. Rahman, Suresh Peters, Shahul Hameed
Taxi Taxi	Sakkarakatti	A. R. Rahman	A R Rahman, Javed Ali, Benny Dayal, Blaaze and Viviane Chaix
Kilimanjaro	Enthiran	A. R. Rahman	Javed Ali, Chinmayi
Mayiliragae Mayiliragae	Anbe Aaruyire	A. R. Rahman	Naresh Iyer, Madhushree
Rai Rai Raa Raa	Peddi	A. R. Rahman	A. R. Rahman
Gulmohar Malare	Majunu	Harris Jayaraj	Hariharan
Mudhal Mazhai	Bheemaa	Harris Jayaraj	Hariharan, Mahathi, R. Prasanna
Hasili Fisiliye	Aadhavan	Harris Jayaraj	Karthik, Harini
Suttum Vizhi	Ghajini	Harris Jayaraj	Sriram Parthasarathy, Bombay Jayashree
Yaaridamum	Thotti Jaya	Harris Jayaraj	Ramesh Vinayagam, Harini
Uyirile	Vettaiyaadu Vilaiyaadu	Harris Jayaraj	Mahalakshmi Iyer, Srinivas
Meela Mudiyamal(Unreleased track)	Vaaranam Aayiram	Harris Jayaraj	Benny Dayal, Srimathumitha, Rathika
Sangeetha Swarangal	Azhagan	Maragathamani	S. P. Balasubrahmanyam, Sandhya
Kamban Engu	Jaathi Malli	Maragathamani	S. P. Balasubrahmanyam, K.S. Chitra
Janaki Devi	Samsaram Adhu Minsaram	Shankar–Ganesh	K.S. Chitra
Rendu Kannam Santhana Kinnam	Sivappu Malli	Shankar–Ganesh	K. J. Yesudas, P. Susheela
Panivilum Paruvanila	Paneer Nadhigal	Shankar–Ganesh	K. J. Yesudas
Rosappu Chinna Rosappu	Suryavamsam	S. A. Rajkumar	Hariharan(vers 1), Sujatha Mohan(vers 2)
Edho Oru Paattu	Unnidathil Ennai Koduthen	S. A. Rajkumar	Hariharan(vers 1), Sujatha Mohan(vers 2)
Kanava Ninaiva	Aasal	Bharadwaj	V. V. Prasanna, Manjari
Santhikkadha Kangalil Inbangal	180	Sharreth	Unni Menon, K.S. Chitra, S. Sowmya
En Raasi	Enakkoru Magan Pirappan	Karthik Raja	Sujatha Mohan, P. Unni Krishnan
Inni Naanum Naanilai	Yai! Nee Romba Azhaga Irukke!	Srinivas	Srinivas, Sujatha Mohan, Sunitha Sarathy
Yamini Yamini	Yai! Nee Romba Azhaga Irukke!	Arvind-Shankar	Harish Raghavendra
Aathadi Manasudhan	Kazhugu	Yuvan Shankar Raja	Priya Himesh, Karthik Raja
Ayyayyo	Paruthiveeran	Yuvan Shankar Raja	Shreya Ghoshal, Krishnaraj, Manikka Vinayagam, Yuvan Shankar Raja(Humming)
Dheivangal Ellam	Kedi Billa Killadi Ranga	Yuvan Shankar Raja	Vijay Yesudas
Kadhal Vaithu	Deepavali	Yuvan Shankar Raja	Vijay Yesudas
Un Mela Oru Kannu	Rajinimurugan	D. Imman	Jithin Raj, Mahalakshmi Iyer
Muzhumadhi Muzhumadhi	Kanimozhi	Satish Chakravarthy	Vijay Yesudas, Bela Shende
Ithanai Dhooram	Koottam	James Vasanthan	Haricharan, Shweta Mohan
Vinmeen Vithaiyil	Thegidi	Nivas K. Prasanna	Abhay Jodhpurkar, Saindhavi
