= Milind Date =

Indian flautist and music composer

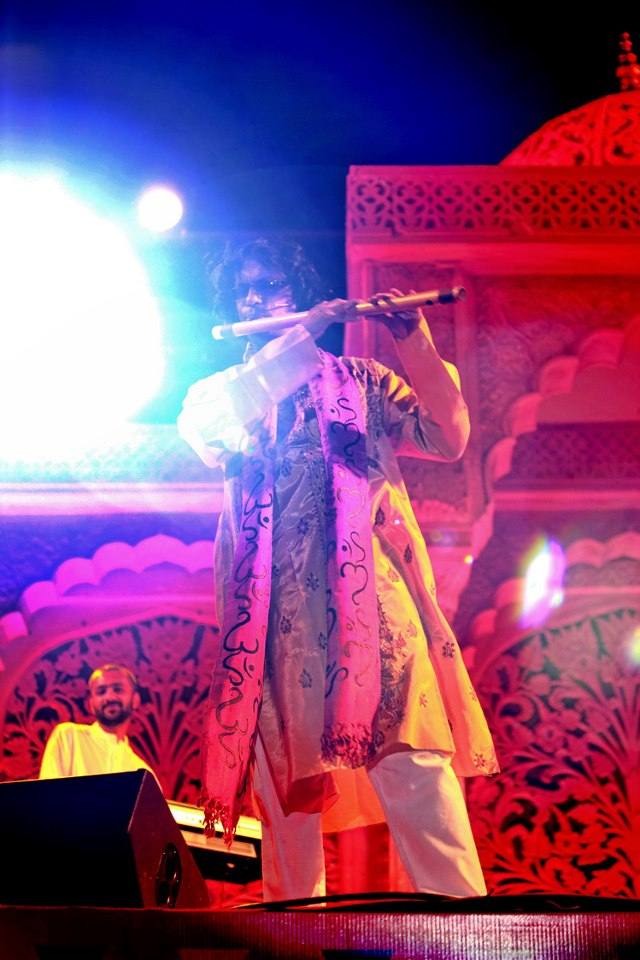
- Milind Date performing in Siddhi Vinayak Festival Mumbai

Background information
- Born: Milind Date; 28 February; Pune, Maharashtra, India
- Genres: Hindustani classical music, Fusion, world music, pop
- Occupations: Composer, producer, bansuri player
- Instrument: Bansuri
- Years active: 1987–present
- Labels: Polyglobe Music, Mook Sound, Questz World, Neelam Audio, Ragaworld.Com
- Website: www.milind.date

Milind Date (born 28 February) is an Indian flautist and music composer who plays the bansuri. He studied under Hariprasad Chaurasia and is known for his technique and playing in various musical styles.

== Early life and career ==
At the age of 21, Date started learning flute from Ajit Soman in his hometown Pune. After a year, he was learning from Hariprasad Chaurasia. When Date turned 25, he had already performed with Hridaynath Mangeshkar, Asha Bhosle, Usha Mangeshkar, Yashwant Deo, Suresh Wadkar, Ghulam Ali, Trilok Gurtu and other outstanding musicians. In 1998, Date started a world Music band – "Fusion Ensemble". Date has performed in over 3500 Indian classical, fusion, and world music concerts.

Besides of course Pt. Hariprasad ji, Milind considers influences of 4 legendary musicians on his music. Dr. L. Subramaniam, Pandit Jasraj, Ustad Vilayat Khan and Asha Bhosale. Milind also says that he learnt a lot from Ashok Hande, Pt. Hridaynath Mangeshkar, Pt. Jagjit Singh [Ghazal Singer], and Ustad Zakir Hussain

Milind has been blessed by the teachings of spiritual masters Osho and Sai Kaka.

Milind Date has performed different styles of music such as Indian classical music, Indian folk music, Devotional Music, Jazz, Arabic, Blues, Rock, Fusion or World Music, and Free Music. He has experimented with several music and dance forms through his performances and recordings.

Date produced and composed an album called "The Earth Concerto" with musicians from Iran, Iraq, Korea, Israel, Morocco and India. This album won several awards in South Korea. Date co-produced the mainstream American pop music album "Fantasy" for the New York-based singer, Angeli. "Prayer from the Heart", a meditation album, was released by Polyglobe Music Austria. For this album Milind has collaborated with Tanmayo, a Scottish singer and violinist, and Shubhangi, an Indian singer.

In 2010, Milind Date produced his debut album of devotional Marathi songs 'Krishna Gaan'. Singers including Suresh Wadkar and Shubhangi Gokhale-Joshi have sung the songs. This album went into private circulation, and copies have been distributed for free.

Milind date has recently launched his another live production 'Milind Date Experience' and has been touring with it for last five years. The group has performed in over 500 shows. After Fusion Ensemble, Date performs with a keyboard-orientated sound more than the previous guitar-orientated sound for live performances. Now, Date is touring with a steady line up of Charudatta Phadake playing Tabla – Kanjira, Subhash Deshpande playing Keyboards and Abhay Ingale playing various percussion instruments, Dholak Octapad and Djembe. They have travelled in India performing about 300 concerts in the last three to four years.

In April 2013, Date travelled to the USA for the first time. He performed mostly Indian classical music in several concerts. Date went on his around the world tour, called the "World is Round 2013" tour, until October of that year. As a part of this tour, Date performed extensively in South Korea after a gap of six years. This was his 11th performance tour to South Korea.

Date recently performed for an event in Delhi where President of India was participating. In this performance he created a new Woodwind Ensemble. Indian wind instruments from India included in the ensemble were Shehnai, Nadaswaram, Venu, Algoza, Pungi, Sundri and Bansuri.

Date composed music for the film Among the Believers directed by Emmy Award winner Hemal Trivedi. This filmed was released in Tribeca Film Festival and was nominated for the 2017 Emmy Award. Date also composed music for the film, Flying On One Engine in 2008 directed by Joshua Z. Weinstein.

On the day of Gudhi Padwa of 2015, Milind's Indian Classical music album 'Milder Milind' was launched by the Kolkata-based 'Qustz World' music label. Milind has played Raag Naagmani, Raag Madhuvanti, Raag Gorakh Kalyan and Bhatiyal Dhun in this album. This album was nominated for Global Indian Music Academy Awards (GiMA) awards in India.

The USA-based record label, Neelam Audio Video released another Indian Classical Album Sunand Sarang on the day of Krishna Janmashtami in 2015. Date has played a new Raga composed by him - Sunand Sarang. This is a variation of the raag Madhymaadi Sarang.

Date released two albums with Manish Vyas, a singer and composer. These were released by New Earth Records and Malimba Records.

Date toured South Korea 12th time in 2015. The tour was a part of his 'East Winds Tour' of Malaysia and Thailand as well as the One Month Festival curated by famous pianist Park Chang Soo.

In November 2019, Date was conferred the prestigious Femina Pune's Most Powerful Award.

On 23 February 2020, Date was conferred the prestigious Economic Times Gen Next Award.

From January 2021 till July 2021, he travelled solo in his car, across western India. From Tamil Nadu to Ladakh, Date travelled interacting with local musicians and artisans. He is reported to be writing a travel book from his experiences in this travel.

On the day of Holi of 2022, Date released his new series of albums - Music For Sleep.

Date released 20 albums in the month of August 2022.

== New ragas ==
Date has been credited with the creation of several new ragas. Most of these are not just a combination of two other already existing ragas, but they have special structure. By applying very specific rules, Date has created these ragas which bear the mark of his style on them. One can find a certain similarity in the ragas created by Date.

A list of notable ragas Date has created –

- Zim Kalyan
- Sunand Sarang
- Sunand Bhairav
- Hari Mohini (Tribute to his Guru Pandit Hariprasad Chaurasia)
- Hari Bhairav (Tribute to his Guru Pandit Hariprasad Chaurasia)
- Hussaini Bhairav (Tribute to Ustad Zakir Hussain)
- Mugdha Chandrika
- Divya Chandrika
- Uday Chandrika
- Mangeshi Todi (Tribute to Lata Mangeshkar, Asha Bhosale, Hridaynath Mangeshkar and Family)
- Narendra Kaunsa (Tribute to Shri Narendra Modi)
- Krishna Prabha (Dedicated to Spiritual Guru Sai Kaka)
- Keshav Bhairav (Dedicated to Keshav Baliram Hegdewar) (Of Rashtriya Swayamsevak Sangh)
- Madhav Bhairav (Dedicated to M. S. Golwalkar) (Of Rashtriya Swayamsevak Sangh)
- Osho Priya (Dedicated to the spiritual master) Osho
- Shiv Durga [ Combination of Raags Shiv Ranjani and Durga]
- Shashi Prabha ( Dedicated to Kathak dancer Prabha Marathe)
- Anuradha ( Dedicated to Smt. Anuradha Chaurasia. The wife of Pandit Hariprasad Chaurasia)

Neelam Records of USA released an album of Raga Sunand Sarang in 2015.

== Discography ==
- Raag Shiv Durga
- Shri Krishna Govind by Mahika - Date is a Featuring Artist
- Himalaya Flute
- Sunand Sarang [Re-release for streaming]
- Rishikesh Chronicles
- Om Chant - Different singles with variations of chanting of Om
- Hypnotic Ragas Romantic Flute - Night Ragas Indian Classical Music album
- Yamini - Romantic Flute - Night Ragas Indian Classical Music album
- Krishnagaan - Songs of Lord Krishna with Suresh Wadkar and Shubhangi Joshi
- Sunand Bhairav Indian Classical Music single
- Swar Venu - Indian Classical Music album
- Prabhat Sagar - Indian Classical Music album
- Contemplative Mind - Indian Classical Music album
- Hypnotic Ragas
- The Noble Mind
- Prashanti
- From Anxiety to Ecstasy Meditation Music
- Maitri Bhavana Meditation Music
- Hands of Love - Music for Reiki
- Reiki Hands of Love
- Reiki
- Reiki Living
- Spa Wellness
- Mindfulness
- Ocean and Trees
- Lights of Faith
- A Walk in Himalayas
- Pensive Mind - Music For Sleep - Malkaunsa
- Infinite Mind - Music For Sleep - Hari Mohini
- Krishna Mind - Music For Sleep - Krishna Prabha
- Empathetic Mind - Music For Sleep - Mugdh Chandika
- Quiet Mind - Music For Sleep - Rageshree
- Tranquil Mind - Music For Sleep - Yaman
- Bansuri Lounge
- Chitta Shanti
- Naad Nidra - Shoonyata
- Naad Nidra - Swasth Nidra
- Naad Nidra - Sushupti
- Naad Nidra - Antar Pradnya
- Atma Bhakti - New Earth Records (With Manish Vyas)
- Sunand Sarang - Neelam Audio
- Milder Milind - Questz World [Nominated for GIMA Awards 2016
- Enchanting Kirwani - Live in Concert
- Raag Poorvi - Transcendent Evening
- 'Prayer From The Heart'
- 'Earth Concerto' - with musicians from 6 countries
- 'Fusion Ensemble' - The East West Fusion
- 'Fantasy' - Angeli
- 'Universe Will Never End' - With Devapath
- 'Aayuta ki Pawan' - With 'Sangeet' - Kim JinMook
- Punyapur ki Sarita - Mook Sound - South Korea
- Diamond Sutra - Mook Sound -Winner of Critics Choice Award in South Korea
