= Kalavati =

Janya rof Carnatic music, also used in Hindustani classical music

- Thaat: Khamaj
- Type: Audava-Audava
- Time of day: Evening
- Arohana: S G P D n S'
- Avarohana: S' n D P G S
- Vadi: Pa
- Samavadi: Sa

Kalavati or Kalawati is a modern pentatonic Hindustani classical raga. Svaras Re (the second tone) and Ma (the fourth tone) are strictly omitted (Varjya/Varjit). Kalavati belongs to the Khamaj Thaat.

== Aroha and avaroha ==
Ārohana

S G P D n S'

In the Western scale, assuming S == C, this would roughly translate to: C E G A B♭ c

Avarohana

S' n D P G S

Kalavati uses (komal) ni as a Vakra Svara in Aroha.

P D n D S'

== Vadi and samavadi ==
The Vadi is Pa, while the Samvadi is Sa

== Pakad or chalan ==
Komal Ni is weak in Aroha and often dropped: G P D n D S' or S G P D S', but in Tanas G P D n S' is also taken.

Komal Ni is also Andolita G P D n~ D P

It's also used as G P D n – S' D G P D S n – D P

== Organization and relationships ==
Kalavati is derived from a Carnatic raga (see also Yagapriya). According to J.D. Patki the raga was popularized in Maharashtra by Pandit Rao Nagarkar, Roshan Ara Begum and Gangubai Hangal. B.Subba Rao explains the Carnatic Kalavati as omitting Ga and Ni in aroha and Ni in Avaroha, using komal Re. That would make it closer to raga Jansamohini.

== Carnatic music ==
In Carnatic music, Kalavati is approximated as Valachi or Valaji, and is considered to be S G P D n S/S n D P G S, and a janya of the 28th Melakartha, Harikambhoji.

== Bandishes(Compositions) composed in Raag Kalavati ==
S.No	Bandish Name / Bandish Initial Bol	Composer and Creator	Taal
1	Bharat Jahan Se Pyaara..... भारत जहां से प्यारा.....	Pandit Gokulotsavji Maharaj	TeenTaal

== Film songs ==
=== Tamil ===
Song	Movie	Composer	Singer
Pongum Kadalosai	Meenava Nanban	M. S. Viswanathan	Vani Jayaram
Thatti Sellum	Thanga Pathakkam	M. S. Viswanathan	Vani Jayaram, Sai Baba
Pottu Vaitha Mugamo	Sumathi En Sundari	M. S. Viswanathan	S. P. Balasubrahmanyam, B. Vasantha
Unnai Yenni Yennai	Ragasiya Police 115	M. S. Viswanathan	P. Suseela
Devi Sridevi	Devi	V. Dakshinamoorthy	P. Suseela
Naan Indri Yaar Vaaruvaar (Ragamalika:Abhogi, Valaji)	Maalaiyitta Mangai	Viswanathan–Ramamoorthy	T. R. Mahalingam, A. P. Komala
Yeriyile Oru Kashmir Roja (Ragamalika:Kedar/Hamirkalyani, Valaji)	Madhanamaaligai	M. B. Sreenivasan	P. Suseela, K. J. Yesudas
Vasantha Kaalam Varumo	Marakka Mudiyumaa?	T. K. Ramamoorthy	P. Suseela, K. J. Yesudas
Naan Irukka Bayam Edarkku	Neethiyin Marupakkam	Ilaiyaraaja	S. Janaki
Govardhanan Vanthan	Raga Bandhangal	Kunnakudi Vaidyanathan	Vani Jairam
Kudumbathin Thalaivi Kulavilakku	Olimayamaana Ethirkaalam	Vijaya Bhaskar	Vani Jairam
Azhagana Sandhangal	Adhu Antha Kaalam	Chandrabose	K.J. Yesudas, Vani Jairam
Parvai Theril	Hemavin Kadhalargal	Raveendran	S. P. Balasubrahmanyam
Thirukona Moolam	Desam	A. R. Rahman	S.P. Balasubrahmanyam, Master Vignesh, Baby Pooja
Kanchi Kamatchi	Killadi Mappillai	Deva	Mano
Yedhukkaga Enna	Rummy	D. Imman	Santhosh Hariharan, A. V. Pooja

== Behavior ==
G is often a starting note of a combination: G G P D n D P G. While returning to Sa a descending meend is taken from Ga to Sa

Other movements:

S, G P, G\S ṇ Ḍ S, S ^{P}G P, ^{D}P ^{G}S, G P D - - D - - n D P, G G P D n~ , n D P, G P, G P D n D, ^{n}D S', S' ^{G'} S' S' G' P' G' S' n D, G P D, n n D P, G D P, G n D, G'\S' n D, n D P G P ^{D}P G\S, ṇ Ḍ S - | G P D n S n D P G\S - ||

=== Samay (time) ===
Evening

== Historical information ==
=== Important recordings ===
- Imrat Khan, L.P.record No. EASD-1358
- Nishat Khan, "Sentimental Sitar", Super Cassettes Ind (1994). Ltd, as CD: SICCD 042
- Prabha Atre, "Classical Vocal: Maru Bihag, Kalavati, Thumri Mishra Khamaj", HMV
- S Balachander, Veena, "Carnatic Instrumental: Muthuswamy Dikshithar Krithi – Kalavati Kamalasana Yuvati"; http://gaana.com/share/titemI41181
- Acharya Dr. Pandit Gokulotsavji Maharaj, Hindustani Classical Vocal, Bharat Jahan Se Pyara भारत जहां से प्यारा. Recorded to DoorDarshan

== See also ==
- Diksha
- Kalavati tantra
- Tantra

== Literature ==
- Moutal, Patrick (1991), A Comparative Studie of Selected Hindustānī Rāga-s, New Delhi: Munshiram Manoharlal, ISBN 81-215-0526-7
- Patki, J.D. (1971–1975), Aprakāśita Rāga (3 Vols.), Hathras: Sangeet Karyalaya
- Patwardhan, Narayan Rao (1961–1974), Rāga Vijñāna (7 Vols.), Poona: Sangeet Gaurav Granthmala
- Rao, B. Subba (1964–1966), Rāganidhi (vols 2,3,4), Madras: Music Academy
