= Pagla Kahin Ka =

- Poster
- Directed by: Shakti Samanta
- Starring: Shammi Kapoor; Asha Parekh; Helen; Prem Chopra
- Music by: Shankar Jaikishan
- Release date: 1970
- Country: India
- Language: Hindi

Pagla Kahin Ka (Such a Fool) is a 1970 Indian Hindi-language romance film directed by Shakti Samanta. It stars Shammi Kapoor, Asha Parekh, Helen, and Prem Chopra all of whom had earlier starred in the huge hit Teesri Manzil (1966). The film is well known for the Mohammed Rafi and Lata Mangeshkar's song "Tum Mujhe Yun Bhula Na Paaoge". The film's music is by Shankar Jaikishan.

== Plot ==
Sujit (Shammi Kapoor) started having mental problems when he was six years old after visiting his dad, Ajit, at a mental asylum. Thereafter, he kept on getting into trouble, and even ran away from the orphanage. Years later, a musician and singer, Shyam (Prem Chopra), finds Sujit singing on the roadside, and decides to hire him as a singer in a nightclub. This is where Sujit meets dancer, Jenny (Helen), and both fall in love with each other. When they announce their plans to get married, the news does not augur well with the nightclub's owner, Max. An argument ensues, Max draws a gun, and Shyam ends up killing Max. Sujit decides to take the blame and is arrested by the police. In order to escape the gallows, he feigns insanity, and is ordered to be admitted to a mental asylum until he recovers. In the asylum, he is placed under the compassionate care of Dr. Shalini (Asha Parekh) and about a year later is discharged. He returns to the nightclub just in time for Jenny's and Shyam's engagement party. Baffled, confused and angered at this betrayal, he really does go insane and ends up being re-admitted in the very same asylum. But this time his chances of recovery are very slim as he has retreated deep into the inner recesses of his mind - from where he may never return. Even though Helen does her usual cabaret dance number in this film, it still contains one of her most dramatic roles, as she plays a rape victim.

== Cast ==
- Shammi Kapoor as Sujit
- Asha Parekh as Dr. Shalini
- Prem Chopra as Shyam
- Helen as Jenny
- Murad as Judge
- Manmohan Krishna as Head of the Mental Hospital
- K. N. Singh as Nightclub Owner (as Max)
- Sunder as Inmate
- Sajjan as Inmate (as Ramu Dada)
- Viju Khote
- Brahm Bhardwaj as Advocate S.K. Mehta (as Brahma Bhardwaj)
- Birbal as Inmate - Maharaja
- Mohan Choti as Inmate
- Polson as Inmate

== Soundtrack ==
#	Song	Singer	Raga
1	"Log Kahen Mujhe Pagla Kahin Ka"	Mohammed Rafi	
2	"Tum Mujhe Yun Bhula Na Paaoge" (Male)	Mohammed Rafi	Jhinjhoti
3	"Na Ro Tu Yahan Aise Ae Mere Dil"	Mohammed Rafi	
4	"Meri Bhains Ko Danda Kyun Maara"	Manna Dey	
5	"Tum Mujhe Yu Bhula Na Paaoge (Female)"	Lata Mangeshkar	Jhinjhoti
6	"Tum Mujhe Yu Bhula Na Paaoge" (Short)	Lata Mangeshkar	Jhinjhoti
7	"Suno Zindagi Gaati Hai"	Asha Bhosle	

== Reception ==
The Indian Express wrote, "the film is as bad as one can expect any film with Shammi Kapoor and Asha Parekh to be". The film was not commercially successful. Leading lady Asha Parekh said audiences didn't want to see Shammi Kapoor play a madman. Nevertheless, the film remains one of her personal favorites, calling it a "beautiful film." In her 2017 memoir "The Hit Girl", she wrote that Shammi Kapoor loved the song "Tum Mujhe Yun Bhula Na Paaoge" so much that in his later years, he used it as a ringtone for his cellphone. She also found it to be one of her favorite songs and said she felt privileged to have Lata Mangeshkar's version picturized on her. The song was played at Lata Mangeshkar's funeral in 2022. Director Shakti Samanta, impressed by Parekh's performance in this film, cast her again in Kati Patang (1970), which became commercially successful, and won her the Filmfare Best Actress Award. Her co-star Helen also called it a "very nice film." Actor Kamal Haasan wanted to star in the Tamil remake and asked Mani Ratnam to direct it, but Ratnam declined.
