= K.A. Narayan =

Indian screenwriter

K. A. Narayan
- Born: Mysuru
- Years active: 1957 till 1985
- Children: Sudarshan Brinda

K A Narayan, also known as Narayan, was an Indian screenwriter for films such as Johny Mera Naam (1970), Victoria No. 203 (1972), Jewel Thief (1967), Geet Gaya Patharon Ne (1964), and Ek Musafir Ek Hasina (1962).

== Filmography ==
| Year | Title | Production Company | As |
|---|---|---|---|
| 1957 | Hum Panchhi Ek Daal Ke | AVM Productions | Story Writer |
| 1959 | Guest House | | Screenplay |
| 1960 | College Girl | Rawal Films | Story and Screenplay |
| 1962 | Ek Musafir Ek Hasina | Filmalaya Pvt. Ltd. | Screenplay |
| 1964 | Geet Gaya Patharon Ne | V. Shantaram Productions | Story Writer |
| 1966 | Devar | | Screenplay |
| 1967 | Jewel Thief | Navketan Films | Story Writer |
| 1968 | Duniya (1968 film) | Amarjeet | Story Writer |
| 1969 | Pyar Hi Pyar | Amarjeet | Story & Screenplay |
| 1969 | Mahal (1969 film) | Amarjeet | Story & Screenplay |
| 1970 | Johny Mera Naam | Mehboob Studios | Story Writer |
| 1972 | Raampur Ka Lakshman | | Story & Screenplay |
| 1972 | Victoria No. 203 | Brij Sadanah | Story & Screenplay |
| 1972 | Raja (1972 film) | Tamil Remake of Johny Mera Naam | Story Writer |
| 1974 | Insaaniyat | J.V. Films | Story & Screenplay |
