= Devar =

1966 Hindi film

- Theatrical release poster
- Directed by: Mohan Segal
- Screenplay by: K. A. Narayan
- Dialogues by: Sarshar Sailani
- Story by: Tarashankar Bandopadhyay
- Based on: Naa (1961 novel) by Tarashankar Bandopadhyay
- Produced by: Mohan Segal
- Starring: Dharmendra; Sharmila Tagore; Shashikala; Deven Verma
- Cinematography: M. N. Malhotra
- Edited by: Pratap Dave
- Music by: Roshan
- Production company: Mohan Segal Productions
- Distributed by: De-lux Films
- Release date: 1966
- Country: India
- Language: Hindi

Devar is a 1966 Hindi tragic-drama film directed by Mohan Sehgal. It stars Dharmendra and Sharmila Tagore in the lead roles, supported by Shashikala and Deven Verma. The music is by Roshan and the lyrics by Anand Bakshi; this is their only film together that met with success.

The film is based on the short novel Naa by the Bengali writer Tarashankar Bandopadhyay. This novel was already adapted into a 1954 Bengali film of the same name, and the 1962 Tamil movie Padithaal Mattum Podhuma.

== Plot ==
The film revolves around two childhood sweethearts, Shankar and Bhawariya, who are separated in their youth by unfortunate circumstances. Shankar grows up to be a somewhat less-educated hunter, while Bhawariya, now known as Madhumati, is a traditional and beautiful woman.

Shankar's cousin, Suresh, is a well-educated advocate. When marriage proposals come for both Shankar and Suresh, family traditions dictate that the boys cannot see their intended brides beforehand, but they are allowed to see the other boy's intended bride. Shankar's proposal is for Madhumati. Suresh's proposal is for Shaanta. Shankar sees Shaanta and finds her suitable for his cousin. Suresh, however, is immediately captivated by Madhumati's beauty when he sees her (as Shankar's intended bride). He decides to deceive both Shankar and Madhumati, in order to marry Madhumati himself.

He devises a wicked scheme. He writes two anonymous "poison-pen" letters to the families of both prospective brides. In these letters, he maligns both Shankar and himself in a way calculated to scuttle the existing proposals. Despite the letter, Shaanta's family, impressed by Shankar's personality when they meet him, agrees to give her hand to him (not realizing he is not as educated as they believed). Suresh, portraying himself as a martyr, agrees to marry Madhumati, thus achieving his ultimate goal. On the wedding night, Shaanta discovers the truth about Shankar's lack of education and feels cheated, leading to a breakdown in their relationship. As the details of the poison-pen letters surface, everyone, including his parents, suspects Shankar of writing them out of jealousy.

Feeling isolated and heartbroken, Shankar finds his only solace in his cousin's kind and understanding wife, Madhumati, who becomes his bhabhi (sister-in-law). Madhumati also becomes fond of his “devar” (brother-in-law), Shankar. Accidentally, Shankar discovers the shocking truth: Madhumati is actually his long-lost childhood sweetheart, Bhawariya. He elects to suffer in silence by keeping it secret. Meanwhile, Madhumati's brother, a handwriting expert, discovers Suresh's wicked plot and the truth about the letters. He confronts Suresh, but Shankar overhears the entire confession. In the resulting emotional confrontation and rift between Shankar and Suresh, Suresh dies in an accidental death.

Shankar is unjustifiably held responsible and charged as the culprit. Madhumati is initially determined to see her husband's killer (Shankar) hanged. However, during the trial, Madhumati, for reasons of her own compassion or perhaps affection, changes her testimony at the last moment, which ultimately saves Shankar from conviction. The story concludes with Shankar being acquitted, but the bittersweet and tragic irony remains: Madhumati never learns that Shankar is her childhood love, a painful secret he keeps to himself.

== Reception ==
The Essential Guide to Bollywood (2005) says that the film "contained deep elements of Bengali literature... The film is remarkable for projecting the ironic twists of fate in an unconventional format with the lead pair bound to the 'wrong' spouses till the very end." In 2014, The Friday Times noted that this film was "probably the only role that comedian Deven Verma played that had shades of grey...."

== Cast ==
- Dharmendra as Shankar: Bhawariya's childhood sweetheart, who is tragically manipulated by Suresh into marrying Shanta
- Sharmila Tagore as Bhawariya / Madhumati: Shankar's childhood sweetheart, whom Suresh marries through an act of trickery
- Shashikala as Shanta: the woman Shankar marries due to Suresh's deceit
- Deven Verma as Suresh: Shankar's wicked cousin who, through deceit, marries Madhumati, Shankar's childhood sweetheart
- Dhumal as Ram Bharose
- Durga Khote as Madhumati's mother
- Mumtaz Begum as Shankar's mother
- Lalita Kumari as Basanti
- Sulochana Latkar as Shakuntala
- Sabita Chatterjee as Lily
- Raj Mehra as Thakur Mahendra Singh
- Tarun Bose as Advocate Gopinath
- D. K. Sapru as Diwan Jaswant Rai (as Sapru)
- Bela Bose as dancer in 'roothe saiyan' song
- Brahm Bhardwaj as Public Prosecutor
- Nazir Kashmiri as judge
- Pardeep Singh

== Music and soundtrack ==
The music of the film was composed by Roshan and the songs were penned by Anand Bakshi.

Songs	Singer	Raga
"Aaya Hai Mujhe Phir Yaad"	Mukesh	Bhairavi
"Baharon Ne Mera Chaman"	Mukesh	Pilu
"Duniya Mein Aisa Kahan"	Lata Mangeshkar	
"Kajalwale Nain Milake"	Mohammed Rafi	
"Roothe Saiyan Hamare"	Lata Mangeshkar	
"Main Mar Gayi, Mushkil Mein Pad Gayi Jaan"	Usha Mangeshkar, Asha Bhosle	
