= Geet Gaya Patharon Ne =

- Theatrical release poster
- Directed by: V. Shantaram
- Written by: V. Shantaram (dialogues); Hasrat Jaipuri; Vishwamitra Adil (lyrics)
- Screenplay by: V. Shantaram
- Story by: K.A. Narayan
- Produced by: V. Shantaram
- Starring: Jeetendra; Rajshree
- Cinematography: Krishna Rao Vashirda
- Edited by: V. Shantaram
- Music by: Ramlal
- Production company: V. Shantaram Productions
- Release date: 21 August 1964
- Running time: 162 minutes
- Country: India
- Language: Hindi

Geet Gaya Patharon Ne (transl. The Rocks Sang a Melody) is a 1964 Hindi-language drama film, produced and directed by V. Shantaram on V. Shantaram Productions banner. Starring Jeetendra, Rajshree which were first marked debut to both of them and music is composed by Ramlal.

== Plot ==
Vijay, son of a poor temple sculptor and a tour guide, was a carefree young lad. One day while helping his father to guide a bunch of young women around the temple, he meets a beautiful young girl named Vidya. After some teasing, both fall in love. Vidya was a classical dancer and motivates the sculptor in Vijay, who makes many beautiful statues in a short time. Meanwhile, Vidya discovers that her mother wants to sell her to a rich man as a mistress. She succeeds in escaping from her mother's house and comes to Vijay. He wants to take his father's permission to marry her, but was rejected as his father thinks that Vidya is a prostitute. Moreover, he thinks that Vidya couldn't stand poverty. Vijay, seeing Vidya helpless, marries her anyway with the help of his chacha (uncle)

On the other hand, a rich old gentleman wants to build a mahal of the like of ancient Indian architecture and wants to fill it with ancient Indian sculptures. It is also revealed that his only daughter was kidnapped years ago by his maid and has not yet been found. His representative, who was a sculptor himself before he lost his hands in an accident, searches everywhere for a man to do the job. He finally gets impressed by the art of Vijay, and invites him to work for this gentleman. Vijay agrees and leaves with him while Vidya stays with chacha.

By the time he comes back after a year, chacha dies and his father tells him that Vidya left for a rich man as she couldn't live in the poor locality. He goes there and sees her in the house of a rich man and angrily leaves. Vidya tries to explain things, but he wouldn't listen and not even acknowledge the child in Vidya's hands. Devastated, Vidya wants kill herself, but doesn't on the account of her son. She joins as a cook in the house of a gentleman. He was the same gentleman who offered the job to Vijay. Later, Vijay comes back and selects Vidya as his model without knowing her identity as she always veils her face. Years pass and Vijay almost completes the job when he, at last, identifies Vidya. Vidya tries to explain to him, but he was still angry and wouldn't listen to her and just wants to finish his job and leave. After some drama, Vidya's mother comes and reveals that Vidya has been chaste all the time and that she was the actual culprit. It is also revealed that Vidya was the lost daughter of this gentleman and this woman who poses as Vidya's mother was the kidnapper. Vidya forgives Vijay and everybody is reconciled.

== Cast ==
- Jeetendra as Vijay
- Rajshree as Vidya
- Surendra (actor) as Ramlal
- Keshavrao Date as Vijay's father
- C.H. Atma as Chacha
- Nana Palsikar as Dinanath - armless sculptor
- Paresh Kumar
- Dalveer
- Parsuram
- Kamal
- Bharathi as Chanchal
- Mai Bhide as Vidya's foster mother
- Master Babloo as Vidya's son

== Soundtrack ==
The movie has music by Ramlal. Hasrat Jaipuri and Vishwamitra Adil wrote the lyrics.

#	Title	Singer(s)	Raga	Lyricists
1	"Saanson Ke Taar Par, Geet Gaya Pathro Ne" (Solo)	Kishori Amonkar	Durga (raga)	Hasrat Jaipuri
2	"Saanson Ke Taar Par, Geet Gaya Pathro Ne" (Duet)	Mahendra Kapoor, Asha Bhosle	Durga (raga)	Hasrat Jaipuri
3	"Ho Saath Agar, Mandave Tale Garib Ke"	C. H. Atma		Hasrat Jaipuri
4	"Aa Ja, Janeja Mere Meharaban"	Asha Bhosle		Hasrat Jaipuri
5	"Janewale O Mere Pyar"	Asha Bhosle		Hasrat Jaipuri
6	"Aayiye Padhariye"	Mahendra Kapoor, Asha Bhosle & Chorus		Vishwamitra Adil
7	"Raat Naujawan"	Asha Bhosle		Hasrat Jaipuri
8	"Ek Pal Jo Mila Hai"	C. H. Atma		Hasrat Jaipuri
9	"Tere Khayalo me Hum"	Asha Bhosle	Ragamalika	Vishwamitra Adil

== Awards ==
- Filmfare Best Cinematographer Award: Krishnarao Vashirda
