= Kalyan (thaat) =

Mode in Hindustani classical music

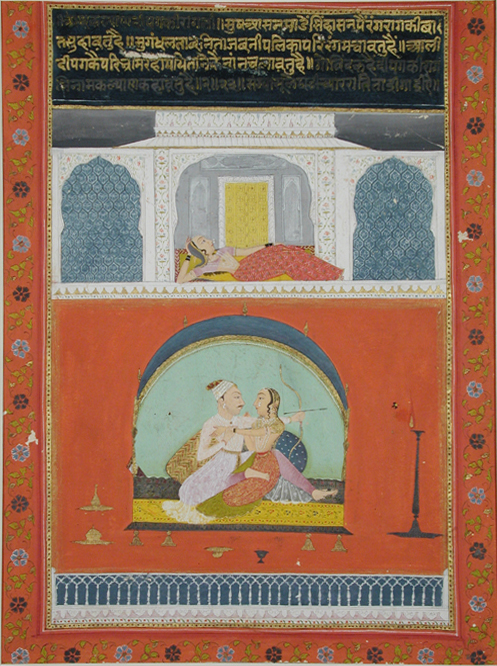
Kalyan Ragini of Dipak by Jai Kishan, 1756

Kalyan (IAST: Kalyāṇ) is one of the ten basic Thaats of the Hindustani classical music of the Indian subcontinent. It is also the name of a Raag (now more popularly known as Raag Yaman) within this very Thaat.

== Description ==
The Kalyan Thaat consists of an important group of early afternoon, late evening, early night, and early morning ragas. Characterised by the Teevr Madhyam (M') instead of the standard Shuddh Madhyam of the Bilawal Thaat, the name of this Thaat literally means good luck/ fortune (कल्याण). Raags of this Thaat are considered to be a blessing-seeking and soothing. As a result, they are often performed in the evening or at the beginning of a concert. These Raags create the feeling of the unfolding of an evening or good fortune.

The Hindustani Classical Thaats are defined in their relation with the Bilawal Thaat, which has all shuddha (pure) notes.

	Bilaawal Thaat	Kalyaan Thaat
Definition	All shuddh (pure) notes	Madhyam is tivra or sharp Ma'
Indian Sargam Notes	Sa Re Ga Ma Pa Dha Ni Sa	Sa Re Ga Ma' Pa Dha Ni Sa
Notes in the C scale	C D E F G A B C	C D E F# G A B C
Whole/Half Steps	W-W-H-W-W-W-H	W-W-W-H-W-W-H
Degrees	1 2 3 4 5 6 7	1 2 3 ♯4 5 6 7
Western Equivalent	Ionian Mode or Major Scale	Lydian Mode
Carnatic Equivalent	Raga Sankarabharanam	Raga Kalyani

== Raags ==
Some Raags in the Kalyan Thaat:

- Raag Yaman
- Raag Bhupali
- Raag Hindol
- Raag Kedar
- Raga Shuddha Kalyan
- Raag Shyam Kalyan
- Raag Yaman Kalyan
- Raag Khem Kalyan
- Raag Savani Kalyan
- Raag Chhayanat
- Raag Hameer
- Raag Gaud Sarang
- Raag Kamod
- Raag Maru Bihag
- Raag Nand/ Anand
