= Rageshree =

Hindustani raga

- Thaat: Khamaj
- Time of day: 2nd prahar of night
- Arohana: Ḍ Ṉ̣ S G M D Ṉ Ṡ
- Avarohana: Ṡ Ṉ D M G M (G)\ R S
- Pakad: G M D Ṉ Ṡ; Ṡ Ṉ D M G M R S
- Vadi: G
- Samavadi: Ṉ
- Synonym: Rageshri; Rageshvari
- Similar: Bageshri

Rageshree is a raga in Indian classical music, popular in both Carnatic music and Hindustani music. It is from the Khamaj thaat. It is pentatonic in aaroha, hexatonic in avaroha. The main difference between Rageshree and the popular raga Bageshree is that Rageshree has Shuddha Gandhar whereas Bageshree has Komal Gandhar. Rageshree has a light romantic mood.

== Film songs ==
=== Language:Hindi ===
Song	Film	Composer	Singer(s)
Kaun Aya Mere Mana Ke Dware	Dekh Kabira Roya	Madan Mohan	Manna Dey
Mere Sang Ga Gunguna Koi Geet Suhana	Janwar	Shankar Jaikishan	Suman Kalyanpur
Mane Na, Mane Na	Jaagir	Madan Mohan	Lata Mangeshkar

=== Language:Tamil ===
Song	Film	Composer	Singer(s)
Kaanaa Inbam Kanindhadheno	Sabaash Meena	T. G. Lingappa	T. A. Mothi, P. Susheela
Kalaiyae En Vazhkaiyin	Meenda Sorgam	T. Chalapathi Rao	A. M. Rajah, P. Susheela
Mayakkum Maalai	Gulebakavali	K. V. Mahadevan	A. M. Rajah, Jikki
Idhaya Vaasal Thirantha Pothum	Thoongatha Kannindru Ondru	K. V. Mahadevan	S. P. Balasubrahmanyam, S. Janaki
Anbale Thediya En	Deivapiravi	R. Sudarsanam	C. S. Jayaraman, S. Janaki
Kangale Kangale	Vaazhkai Padagu	Viswanathan–Ramamoorthy	P. B. Sreenivas
Malarukku Thendral	Enga Veettu Pillai	Viswanathan–Ramamoorthy	P. Susheela, L. R. Eswari
Paal Irukkum Pazham Irukkum	Paava Mannippu	Viswanathan–Ramamoorthy	T. M. Soundararajan, P. Susheela
Ponnezhil Pootadu	Kalangarai Vilakkam	M. S. Viswanathan	T. M. Soundararajan, P. Susheela
Nee Ennenna Sonnalum	Netru Indru Naalai	M. S. Viswanathan	T. M. Soundararajan, P. Susheela
Nilave Ennidam	Ramu	M. S. Viswanathan	P. B. Sreenivas, P. Susheela
Avan Nenaithaana	Selva Magal	M. S. Viswanathan	T. M. Soundararajan
Kannanin Sanithiyil	Oru Kodiyil Iru Malargal	M. S. Viswanathan	P. Jayachandran, P. Susheela
Nee Engey En Ninaivugal	Mannippu	S. M. Subbaiah Naidu	T. M. Soundararajan, P. Susheela, A. P. Komala
Punnagai Mannan	Iru Kodugal	V. Kumar	P. Susheela, K. Jamuna Rani
Melatha Mella	Aruvadai Naal	Ilaiyaraaja	Malaysia Vasudevan, S. Janaki
Kelaayo Kanna	Naane Raja Naane Mandhiri	Ilaiyaraaja	P. Susheela, Usha Srinivasan
Kala Kala Sangamamo	Ezhumalayaan Magimai	Ilaiyaraaja	Ilaiyaraaja, S. Janaki
Then Mozhi	Solla Thudikuthu Manasu	Ilaiyaraaja	Mano
Kaviyam Padava Thendrale	Idhayathai Thirudathe	Ilaiyaraaja	Mano
Mounam Yen Mounamey	En Jeevan Paduthu	Ilaiyaraaja	Mano
Eduthu Naan Vidava	Pudhu Pudhu Arthangal	Ilaiyaraaja	Ilaiyaraaja, S. P. Balasubrahmanyam
Singalathu Chinnakuyile (Ragam Bahudari touches also)	Punnagai Mannan	Ilaiyaraaja	S. P. Balasubrahmanyam, K. S. Chithra
Vaikasi Masthula	Ninaivu Chinnam	Ilaiyaraaja	S. P. Balasubrahmanyam, K. S. Chithra
Ingeyum	Sathya	Ilaiyaraaja	Lata Mangeshkar
Unnayum Ennayum	Aalappirandhavan	Ilaiyaraaja	K.J. Jesudas, S. Janaki
Yarodu Yaro	Salangayil Oru Sangeetham	Ilaiyaraaja	S. P. Balasubrahmanyam
Rokkam Irukura Makkal	Kasi	Ilaiyaraaja	Hariharan, Sujatha Mohan
Mazhai Varuthu	Raja Kaiya Vacha	Ilaiyaraaja	K.J. Jesudas, K. S. Chithra
Sangathamizh Kaviye (Ragamalika:Abheri, Bageshri, Sumanesa Ranjani)	Manathil Uruthi Vendum	Ilaiyaraaja	K.J. Jesudas, K. S. Chithra
Santosham Kaanatha	Vasanthi	Chandrabose	K.J. Jesudas, K. S. Chithra
Koluse Koluse	Pen Puthi Mun Puthi	Chandrabose	S. P. Balasubrahmanyam, S. P. Sailaja
Malaicharal Oram	Avathellam Pennalae	Shankar–Ganesh	P. Jayachandran
Naan Vandha Idam	Thanga Kolusu	Deva	S. P. Balasubrahmanyam
Thalaivanai Azhaikuthu	En Aasai Machan	Deva	S. Janaki
Uchathil Otha Kuyil	Partha Parvayil	M. M. A. Iniyavan	Mano, S. Janaki
Pollatha Kannan	Swarnamukhi	Swararaj	K. S. Chithra, Gajendran
Aaromale (Malayalam)	Vinnaithaandi Varuvaayaa	A. R. Rahman	Alphons Joseph
Valayapatti Thavile (Ragamalika:Bihag, Bageshri, Neelambhari)	Azhagiya Tamil Magan	A. R. Rahman	Naresh Iyer, Ujjayinee Roy, Srimathumitha, Darshana KT
Seemanthapoo	99 Songs	A. R. Rahman	Jonita Gandhi, Sharanya Srinivas, Sireesha Bhagavatula
Vallami Tharayo	Vallamai Tharayo	Bharadwaj	Bharadwaj, Surmukhi Raman
Thuli Thuliyai (Ragamalika:Harikambhoji, Bageshri)	Ramanujan	Ramesh Vinayakam	Ramesh Vinayakam, Kaushiki Chakraborty, Vinaya

=== Language:Hindi ===
Song	Film	Composer	Singer
Kaun Aya Mere Mana Ke Dware	Dekh Kabira Roya	Madan Mohan	Manna Dey]
