= Alhaiya Bilaval =

Hindustani classical raga

- Thaat: Bilaval
- Type: Shadava-sampurna
- Time of day: Early Morning (Din ka Pratham Prahar-4 a.m-8 a.m
- Arohana: S ^{G}R G P ^{N}D N S'
- Avarohana: S' ^{N}D n D P M G ^{M}R S
- Pakad: G R G P m G m R G P D n D P
- Vadi: Dha
- Samavadi: Ga
- Synonym: Alhaiya Bilawal
- Similar: Bilawal; Devgiri Bilawal; Shukla Bilawal; Kakubh Bilawal

Alhaiya Bilaval is a Hindustani classical raga. It is the most commonly performed raga of a large group of ragas that are mainly based on a scale more or less identical to the Western major scale. For this reason, that scale itself is known as the Bilaval thaat. It is often simply referred to as Bilaval. Although in the 17th century, Alhaiya and Bilaval may have been separate ragas. Alhaiya Bilaval is a raga in which M is the main key.

== Character ==
Thaat: Bilaval

=== Arohana, Avarohana and Pakad ===
Arohana: S R G P D N S'

Avarohana: S'N D Ṉ D P M G R S

Pakad: G R G P M G M R G P M G M R S

=== Vadi and Samavadi ===
Vadi: Dhaivat

Samavadi: Gandhar

Komal Swar: N (Vakra) in Avarohana

Varjit Swar: M in Arohana

=== Related ragas ===
Alhaiya Bilaval is referred to as Bilaval; however, the Shuddha Bilaval can also be referred to as Bilaval. Bilaval, Shuddha Bilawal, Devgiri Bilawal, Shukla Bilawal, Kakubh Bilawal

=== Time ===
1st Prahar of the Day (6AM to 9AM)

=== Rasa ===
It is filled with Shant Rasa (peaceful).

=== The Indian National Anthem's Raga ===
It is believed that the Indian national anthem "Jana Gana Mana" is sung in the raga Alhaiya Bilaval. But there is a teevra Madhyam svara being employed in the national anthem too. Raga Alhaiya Bilaval does not employ the tivra Madhyama svara; Alhaiya Bilaval is the raga of all Shuddha Svaras and no other types of svaras. So some consider the national anthem to be in raag Gaud Sarang.

== Literature ==
Bor, Joep (ed). Rao, Suvarnalata; der Meer, Wim van; Harvey, Jane (co-authors) The Raga Guide: A Survey of 74 Hindustani Ragas. Zenith Media, London: 1999.
