= Durga (raga) =

Hindustani raga

- Thaat: Bilaval
- Type: Audava
- Time of day: 2nd part of the Night, 9-12
- Arohana: Sa Re Ma Pa Dha Sa
- Avarohana: Sa Dha Pa Ma Re Sa
- Pakad: Re Ma Pa Dha, Ma Re
- Vadi: Ma
- Samavadi: Sa
- Similar: Shuddha Saveri

Durga is a raga in Hindustani Classical music. It shares some features with Shuddha Saveri of Carnatic music (such as the note positions), but is significantly different from it in terms of the sancharas of the raga.

Unless mentioned otherwise, notes refer to the concept of notes in Indian classical music, called ‘swara’ in Hindustani. Durga raga evokes the sringara rasa – romantic love.

== Technical description ==
Feature	Detail	Notes
Jati / Nature	Audav-Audav	5 Notes on both Aaroh and Avroh
Aroha	Sa Re Ma Pa Dha Sa	सा रे म प ध सा^
Avaroha	Sa Dha Ma, Pa Dha Ma, Re Dha. Sa	सा^ ध म, प ध म, रे ध_ सा Pancham should not be a resting note in Avroh
Pakad	Re Ma Pa Dha, Ma Pa Dha, Ma Re, Sa Re Dha. Sa	
Vadi	Ma	
Samvadi	Sa	
Poorvang-Uttarang	Poorvang	The vadi swar M is present in the lower half of the saptak (octave) i.e. S R G M.
Thaat	Bilawal	

=== Notes and features ===
1. All swaras used are suddha
2. Gandhar and Nishad are not used.

=== Example composition ===
R m P D; P D m; m P D D m; D m P D S'; D D S' S' D D m; m P D; m R, D S; Here m is Shuddha Madhyam, M is Tivra Madhyam but this is not used in Durga at all.

== Samay (time) ==
Second Prahar of night : 9:00 p.m. to midnight (nishitha)

== Comparable to ==
=== Malhar ===
Durga has the same notes as Malhar, another popular raag and one of old pedigree. The aural experience of both are significantly different. Technically, they are made apart by the use of rishabh (Re). Durga is also readily distinguished by its salient use of the phrase Sa Re Dha Sa

1) Common phrase Re Pa, distinguished by the use of Re
Both Durga and Malhar have the Re Pa pairing (sangati), however, the Re Pa cohort in Malhar involves a repetition of Re twice or thrice. More importantly the Re has a kaṇ of shuddha madhyam. (ma)

- Malhar: Ma Re Re Re[ma] Pa
- Durga: Ma Pa Dha Sa’ Re Dha Pa Dha Ma Re Pa.

Here, in Malhar, the transition between Re to Pa, the Re has a kaṇ of ma, and is not independently pronounced. The ma is shown stuck to Re in square brackets. Stylistically, the duplication of ‘Re’ is also noted.

2) Different phrases
Also present in the pakad of the raag, Sa Re, Dha Sa is the quintessential phrase of Durga, which is not present in Malhar. (dha denotes dhaivat (dha) of the lower octave i.e. mandra saptak)

=== Jaldhar Kedar ===
Jaldhar Kedar is a variant of, the major raag Kedar, and a part of the raagang of its namesake.

== Film songs ==
Song	Movie	Composer	Artists
Geet Gaya Pattharon Ne	Geet Gaya Patharon Ne	Ramlal Hirapanna Chowdhury	Asha Bhosle
Chanda Re Mori Patiya Le Ja	Banjaarin(1960 film)	Chand Pardesi	Mukesh (singer) & Lata Mangeshkar
Brindavan Ka Krishna Kanhaiya	Miss Mary (1957 film)	Hemant Kumar	Lata Mangeshkar & Mohammed Rafi
Hum Intezar Karenge	Bahu Begum	Roshan (music director)	Mohammed Rafi
Hoga Tumse Pyara Kaun	Zamane Ko Dikhana Hai	R D Burman	Shailendra Singh

=== Bollywood songs ===
1. Geet gaya pattharo ne - Geet Gaya Patharon Ne (1964)
2. Chanda re mori patiya le ja - Banjaarin
3. Vrindavan ka Krishna Kanhaiya - Miss Mary
4. Hum intezaar karenge – Bahu Begam
5. Be Nazaara - Mom
6. Hoga Tumse Pyara Kaun - Zamane Ko Dikhana Hai

=== Language:Tamil ===
Note that the following songs are composed in Shuddha Saveri, the equivalent of raga Durga in Carnatic music.

Song	Movie	Composer	Singer
Sithaye Ye Sithaye	Sivakavi	Papanasam Sivan	M. K. Thyagaraja Bhagavathar
Vaadikkai Maranthathum	Kalyana Parisu	A. M. Rajah	A. M. Rajah, P. Susheela
Manjal Mugam	Karnan	Viswanathan–Ramamoorthy	P. Susheela
Aadiyile Perukkeduthu Aadivarum	Radha (1973)	M. S. Viswanathan	P. Susheela
Swararaaga (Ragamalika:ShuddhaSaveri, Shivaranjani)	Andha 7 Naatkal	M. S. Viswanathan	P. Jayachandran, Vani Jairam
Poonthendral Kaatrraga	Aval Oru Kavarimaan	R. Ramanujam	Malaysia V. Sarangapani, P. Susheela
Radha Radha Nee Enge	Meendum Kokila	Illayaraja	S. P. Balasubrahmanyam, S. Janaki
Kovilmani Osai	Kizhakke Pogum Rail	Illayaraja	Malaysia Vasudevan, S. Janaki
Kadhal Mayakam	Pudhumai Penn	Illayaraja	P. Jayachandran, Sunandha
Rettai Killigal	Ore Oru Gramathiley	Illayaraja	K.J. Yesudas, K. S. Chithra
Malargalil Adum ilamai	Kalyanaraman	Illayaraja	S. P. Sailaja
Asai Kiliyey Naan Solli	Theertha Karaiyinile	Illayaraja	Mano
Sithakathi pookale	Rajakumaran	Illayaraja	S. P. Balasubrahmanyam, K. S. Chithra
Nattu Vacha Roja	Aranmanai Kili	Illayaraja	P. Susheela
Manamagale Manamagale	Thevar Magan	Illayaraja	Minmini, Swarnalatha, Sindhuja
Sandiyare Sandiyare	Virumaandi	Illayaraja	Shreya Ghoshal
Manasaoram	Ayyan	Illayaraja	Sriram Parthasarathy, Sadhana Sargam
Maanada Kodi	Muthal Vasantham	Illayaraja	S. Janaki
Unakagave Naan Uyir Vazhigiren	Rasigan Oru Rasigai	Raveendran	S. Janaki
Vanakkiliye	Kalloori Vaasal	Deva	S. Janaki
Kottungadi Kummi	Surieyan	Deva	S. P. Balasubrahmanyam, S. Janaki
En Uyir Thozhiye	Kangalal Kaidhu Sei	A. R. Rahman	Unni Menon, Chinmayi
Sollitharavaa Sollitharavaa	Majaa	Vidyasagar	Madhu Balakrishnan, Sadhana Sargam
Athikaalaiyil Sevalai	Nee Varuvai Ena	S. A. Rajkumar	P. Unnikrishnan, Sujatha
Murali	Nagadevathai	Hamsalekha	P. Unnikrishnan, K. S. Chithra
O Maha Zeeya	Tamizh Padam	Kannan	Hariharan, Shweta
