= Kedar (raga) =

Hindustani raga

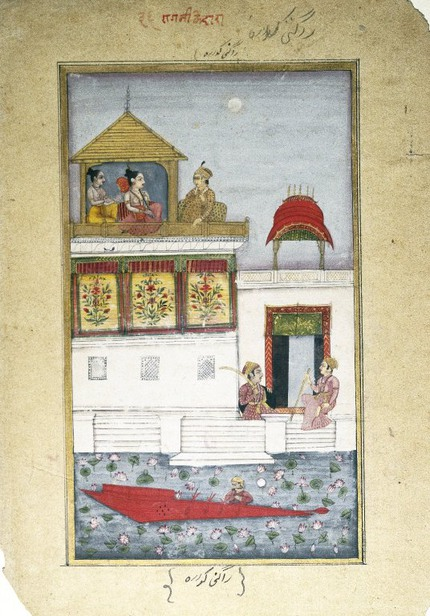
- Thaat: Kalyan
- Type: Chanchal raga
- Time of day: 1st prahar of Singing
- Season: No specific season but sung mostly in rainy season
- Arohana: S M G P D N Ṡ
- Avarohana: Ṡ N D P M̄ P M R S
- Pakad: The pakad of this raga is सा म ग प मे (tivra) म रे सा
- Chalan: सा म ग प मे (tivra) म रे सा
- Vadi: Ma
- Samavadi: Sa
- Synonym: Hameer raga
- Equivalent: Hameer, Gaud Sarang, Kamod, Chhayanat.
- Similar: raga Hameer Kalyani (Carnatic raaga)

Raga Kedar, also known as Kedara, is a Hindustani classical raga. Named after Lord Shiva, the raga occupies a high pedestal in Indian classical music. It is characterised by many melodious turns. This raga is the repetition of the swaras सा and म. It is generally accepted that it displays much thermal energy and is regarded as the Raagini of Raag Deepak. While preceding from Shuddha Madhyam (m) to Pancham (P), a touch of Gandhar (G) or a smooth passage from Gandhar (G) to Pancham (P) expressed as m G P is the more common way of instant raga manifestation.

== Origin ==
The raga emerges from the Kalyan thaat. This raga is named after Lord Shiva and is loved by Lord Krishna. Lord Krishna played this raga on his flute and everyone in Gokul was mesmerized.

== Technical description ==
The raga is of shadaav-sampurna nature, i.e., in its arohana (ascent), only six notes are used, and in avarohana (descent), all seven notes are used. In general, the progression of the raga is highly non-linear, which makes it difficult to capture its essence using arohana and avarohana.

The raga uses only natural (shuddha) versions of the Second (R), Third (G) and Sixth (D), both natural and sharp (tivra) versions of the Fourth (m and M, respectively "( m- tivra, M- shuddh)" and predominantly natural versions of the Seventh (N) but occasionally also its flat (komal) version (n).

Arohana: S M, M'P D M, D N S`

Avarohana: S' N D P, m P D P M~, S R S

Pakad: S M, M P, m P m P, D P M, R S

The notes of the raga are s r g m (m is tivra) p d n s.

The most prominent (vadi) note is M, and the second most prominent (samvadi) is S.

== Samay ==
The raga is to be sung at night. It is sung in the first prahar of night. Most ragas with teevra ma (M) are sung at night (as per the time theory of ragas).

== Further information ==
The meend from D to M via P is the heart of the raga. This phrase is repeated again and again. The G is used as a grace note in the transition from m to P. The movements in the raga from one swara to another are complicated, and the extent of use of the different swaras often depends on the singer. Kedar is one of five ragas that form the Kalyan Panchak or Panchya with Hameer, Gaud Sarang, Kamod, Chhayanat and Kedar. Kedar is an ancient raga, with different genres of classical songs, like khayals, thumris, dhrupads, as well as light classical songs based on it.

According to the Guru Granth Sahib, raga Kedara (ਕੇਦਾਰਾ) expresses and makes the mind aware of the soul's true character. It conveys the emotions of honesty, integrity and truthfulness in a practical and caring way. This approach is memorable, so that the mind is made aware, without arousing cynicism.

== Variants ==
- Adambari Kedar
- Anandi Kedar
- Basanti Kedar
- Chandni Kedar
- Deepak Kedar
- Jaladhar Kedar
- Kedar Bahar
- Kedari Malhar
- Maluha Kedar
- Nat Kedar
- Shuddha Kedar
- Shyam Kedar
- Tilak Kedar

== Film songs ==
=== Language : Hindi ===
| Song | Movie | Composer | Singers |
|---|---|---|---|
| Dharsan Do Ghan Shyam | Narsi Bhagat | Shankar Rao Vyas | Hemant Kumar & Manna Dey & Sudha Malhotra & G.S.Nepali & Ravi |
| Hum Ko Man Ki Shakti Dena | Guddi (1971 film) | Vasant Desai | Vani Jairam & Chorus |
| Main Pagal Mera Manwa Pagal | Ashiana | Madan Mohan | Talat Mahmood |
| Aap Yun Hi Agar Humse Milte Rahe | Ek Musafir Ek Hasina | O. P. Nayyar | Asha Bhosle & Mohammed Rafi |
| Bole To Baansuri | Sawan Ko Aane Do | Raj Kamal | K. J. Yesudas |
| Bekas Pe Karam Kijie Ye | Mughal-e-Azam | Naushad | Lata Mangeshkar |
| Kanha Re Nand Nandan | Single | Traditional | Neeti Mohan |

=== Tamil ===
| Song | Movie | Composer | Singer |
|---|---|---|---|
| En Uyir Thozhi | Karnan | Viswanathan–Ramamoorthy | P. Susheela |
| Udaluku Uyir Kaaval | Manapanthal | Viswanathan–Ramamoorthy | P. B. Sreenivas |
| Kannizhantha | Enippadigal | K. V. Mahadevan | P. Susheela |
| Chandrodayam Oru Pennanatho | Chandhrodhayam | M. S. Viswanathan | T. M. Soundararajan, P. Susheela |
| Vellaikkamalathiley | Gowri Kalyanam | M. S. Viswanathan | Soolamangalam Rajalakshmi |
| Kaaluku Keezhe Naluvuthu | Silambu | M. S. Viswanathan | K. S. Chitra |
| Netru parthatho | En Kanavar | S. P. Venkatesh | K. S. Chitra |
| Yeriyile Oru Kashmir Roja (Ragamalika:Kedar/Hamirkalyani,Valaji) | Madhanamaaligai | M. B. Sreenivasan | P. Suseela, K. J. Yesudas |
| Devi Vantha Neram | Vandichakkaram | Shankar–Ganesh | S. P. Balasubrahmanyam,Vani Jairam |
| Kaiyil Veenai | Vietnam Colony | Ilaiyaraaja | Bombay Jayashree |
| Inimel Naalum | Iravu Pookkal | Ilaiyaraaja | S. Janaki |
| Manasukkul | Kalyana Agathigal | V. S. Narasimhan | Raj Sitaraman, P. Susheela |
| Nila Kaikiradhu | Indira | A. R. Rahman | Hariharan, Harini |
| Malargale Malargale (Shades of Sarawathi and Hamirkalyani) | Love Birds | A. R. Rahman | K. S. Chitra, Hariharan |
| Swasame Swasame (Ragamalika:Kedar/Hamirkalyani,Maand) | Thenali | A. R. Rahman | S. P. Balasubrahmanyam, Sadhana Sargam |
| Kanava Illai Kaatra | Ratchagan | A. R. Rahman | Srinivas |
| Murali Mogha | Galatta Kalyanam | A. R. Rahman | Haricharan, K. S. Chitra |
| Iruvathu Vayathu Varai | Kannodu Kanbathellam | Deva | Hariharan, S. Janaki |
| Pirivellam | Soori | Deva | Harish Raghavendra, Chinmayi |

=== Language : Telugu ===
| Song | Movie | Composer | Singers |
|---|---|---|---|
| Sridevini | Sri Venkateswara Mahatyam | Pendyala (composer) | S. Varalakshmi |
| Sadhinchanouna | Rahasyam (1967 film) | Ghantasala (musician) | Ghantasala (musician) & P. Susheela |
| Nee Madhu Murali gaana leela | Bhakta Jayadeva | S. Rajeswara Rao | Ghantasala (musician) |
| Lalitha Kalaradhanalo | Kalyani (1979 film) | Ramesh Naidu | S. P. Balasubrahmanyam |

=== Hindi ===
Following are the films that used material from raga Kedar:

- Bekas pe karam kijie ye - Mughal-e-Azam (1960)- Lata Mangeshkar
- Bole to bansuri kahi - Sawan Ko Aane Do (1979)- Yesudas
- Darshan do Ghanashyam naath – Narsi Bhagat (1957) – Hemant Kumar, Manna Dey, Sudha Malhotra, Chorus
- Hum ko mann ko shakti dena - Guddi (1971) – Vani Jairam

== Sources ==
- Chandra Kanta
- "Raag Kedar – Indian Classical Music – Tanarang.com". www.tanarang.com.
- "Raga Kedar – A Perspective". Rajan Parrikar Music Archive.
- "On the Variants of Kedar". Rajan Parrikar Music Archive.
