= Bahar (raga) =

Hindustani raga

- Thaat: Kafi
- Type: Shadav-Shadav
- Time of day: Any time in spring else around midnight
- Season: Spring
- Arohana: Ṇ S M ❟ P G̱ M Ṉ D N Ṡ
- Avarohana: Ṡ Ṉ P ❟ M P G̱ M R S
- Vadi: Ma
- Samavadi: Sa
- Similar: Shahana Kanada; Shahana Bahar; Basant Bahar; Adana Bahar

Bahar is a Hindustani classical raga. This raga is very similar (but still distinct) to raga Miyan ki Malhar. This raga is from the Kafi Thaat.

== Theory ==
Writing about the musical theory of Indian classical music is fraught with complications due to its complex and intricate nature. First of all, there have been no set, formal methods of written notation. Indian music is an oral tradition, and therefore writing is not an essential part of attaining talim (systematic study).

But in recent years, a couple of methods of notation (Swarleepi) for Hindustani Classical Music have evolved. A prominent example of them are Bhatkhande Swarleepi (widely used in the present time) by Pt. Vishnu Narayan Bhatkhande.

The creator of this raga was Hzt Amir Khusrau.

=== Arohana & Avarohana ===
Arohana: Ṇ S M ❟ P G̱ M Ṉ D N Ṡ (Note: Alternate notations: Carnatic: Ṇ₃ S M₁ ❟ P G₂ M₁ N₂ D₂ N₃ Ṡ; Western: B C F 𝄒 G E♭ F B♭ A B C)

Avarohana: Ṡ Ṉ P ❟ M P G̱ M R S (Note: Alternate notations: Carnatic: Ṡ N₂ P ❟ M₁ P G₂ M₁ R₂ S; Western: C B♭ G 𝄒 F G E♭ F D C)

=== Vadi & Samvaadi ===
Vadi: Ma

Samvadi: Sa

=== Jati ===
Shadav - Shadav

=== Thaat ===
The Raag belongs to Kafi Thaat

=== Pakad or Chalan ===
The bare scale of this raga has little unique musical meaning, and is, therefore, required to be documented in a manner that incorporates its zigzag phrasing pattern.

R N. S M/ M M P g M / n P M P g M/ P g M n D n P/ g M n D N S' [or] g M D - N S'/ g' M' R' S'/ R' N S' D n P/ n n P M P g M/ P g M R S

=== Samay (Time) ===
The raag is sung at the Middle Night time.

=== Seasonality ===
Certain ragas have seasonal associations. Raag Bahar is usually rendered in the Spring season.

=== Rasa ===
Since it is the raga of spring, it can be considered that the raga has Shringara Rasa.

== Combination with other Ragas ==
Raag Bahar is/can be combined with many ragas because it adds contrast, it can break the monotony of a single mood and offer a duality of emotion in a raga. This is why raga Bahar participates in forming many Jod Ragas. Following is the list of some names of ragas combined with raga Bahar to form a new Jod Raga:

- Adana Bahar
- Bageshri Bahar
- Basant Bahar
- Bhairav Bahar
- Hindol Bahar
- Jayant Bahar
- Kanada Bahar
- Kedar Bahar
- Khamaj Bahar
- Nayaki Bahar
- Rageshri Bahar
- Shahana Bahar
- Shuddha Bahar
- Sohini Bahar
- Suha Bahar

== Prominent Bandishes (Compositions) Set in Raag Bahar ==
Serial number	Raag Name	Bandish Initials or Bandish Name	Taal	Composer/Bandish Creator Name
1	Raag Bahar	Aaye Shyam Radhika Sanga आए श्याम राधिका संग	Teental	Pt. Gokulotsavji Maharaj

== Film Songs ==
Language: Hindi

Song	Movie	Composer	Artists
Sakal Bana Gagan	Mamta (1966 film)	Roshan (music director)	Lata Mangeshkar
Sakal Bana	Heeramandi (2024)	Sanjay Leela Bhansali, Amir Khusro	Raja Hasan
Man Ki Bin Matavari Baje	Shabaab (film)	Naushad	Lata Mangeshkar and Mohammed Rafi
Chham Chham Nachat Ayi Bahar	Chhaya (film)	Salil Chowdhury	Lata Mangeshkar
Re Re Bahar Ayi	Jai Hanumaan(1973 film)	Narayan Datta	Asha Bhosle and Mahendra Kapoor

=== Language: Tamil ===
Song	Movie	Composer	Singer
Thumbi Thullal	Cobra	A. R. Rahman	Nakul Abhyankar, Shreya Ghoshal

== Sources ==
- Bor, Joep; Rao, Suvarnalata (1999). The Raga Guide: A Survey of 74 Hindustani Ragas. Nimbus Records with Rotterdam Conservatory of Music. p. 28. ISBN 9780954397609.
