= Khamaj (thaat) =

Aspect of Hindustani music theory

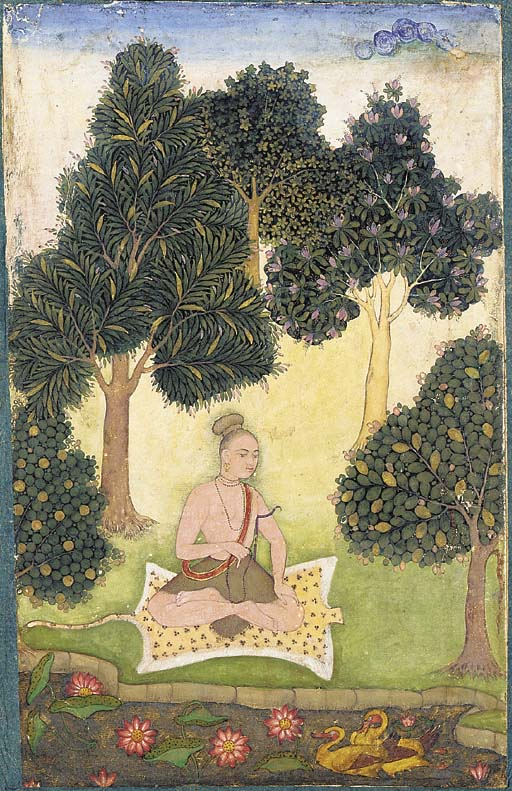
Kamod Ragini, North Indian or Deccani miniature painting, c.1620-40

Khamaj (IAST: Khamāj) is one of the ten thaats (parent scales) of Hindustani music from the Indian subcontinent. It is also the name of a raga within this thaat.

The Khamaj thaat can be obtained by replacing the Shuddha Nishad of Bilaval by Komal Nishad. The ragas of this thaat are full of Shringara Rasa (romantic) hence this raga is mostly rendered in the form of light classical thumris, tappas, horis, kajris etc. Its pictorial descriptions in the existing texts are sensuous and even today, the raga Khamaj is considered to be a 'flirtatious' raag. There is a theory which assumes that in the past, the Khamaj scale found its way in the Ch'in music of late medieval China.

== Description ==
The parent-scale or Thaat of Khamaj, notated in sargam notation, has the following structure: Sa Re Ga Ma Pa Dha Ni Sa'.

In Western terms, assuming the tonic (Sa) to be at C, the scale would be: C D E F G A B-flat C.

Khamaj thaat is thus equivalent to the mixolydian mode in Western classical music. The Carnatic music equivalent of the Khamaj Thaat is Harikambhoji, the 28th Melakarta raga.

== Ragas ==
Ragas in Khamaj thaat include:

- Khamaj
- Rageshree
- Jhinjhoti
- Desh
- Sorath
- Manj Khamaj
- Tilang
- Gara
- Tilak Kamod
- Jaijaiwanti
- Khambavati
- Kalavati
- Khokar
- Khamboji
- Champak
- Deepak
- Gavati
- Janasammohini
