= Gaud Sarang =

- Thaat: Kalyan
- Type: Sampurna
- Time of day: Early afternoon, 12–3
- Arohana: S G R M G P M̄ D P Ṡ N Ṙ Ṡ; S G R M G P M̄ D P N D Ṡ
- Avarohana: Ṡ N D P M̄ P M G ❟ R G R M G P R S; Ṡ D N P D M̄ P G M R P R M R P R S
- Vadi: G
- Samavadi: D
- Similar: Kedar; Chhayanat

Gaud Sarang is a raga in Hindustani classical music that combines characteristics of Sarang and the now extinct raga named Gaud. Unlike most other members of the Sarang family of ragas, Gaud Sarang is assigned to the Kalyan thaat rather than the usual Kafi.

== Theory ==
Arohana:

- S G R M G P M̄ D P Ṡ N Ṙ Ṡ (Note: Alternate notations: Carnatic: S G₃ R₂ M₁ G₃ P M₂ D₂ P Ṡ N₃ Ṙ₂ Ṡ; Western: C E D F E G F♯ A G C B D C)
- S G R M G P M̄ D P N D Ṡ (Note: Alternate notations: Carnatic: S G₃ R₂ M₁ G₃ P M₂ D₂ P N₃ D₂ Ṡ; Western: C E D F E G F♯ A G B A C)

Avarohana:

- Ṡ N D P M̄ P M G ❟ R G R M G P R S (Note: Alternate notations: Carnatic: Ṡ N₃ D₂ P M₂ P M₁ G₃ ❟ R₂ G₃ R₂ M₁ G₃ P R₂ S; Western: C B A G F♯ G F E 𝄒 D E D F E G D C)
- Ṡ D N P D M̄ P G M R P R M R P R S (Note: Alternate notations: Carnatic: Ṡ D₂ N₃ P D₂ M₂ P G₃ M₁ R₂ P R₂ M₁ R₂ P R₂ S; Western: C A B G A F♯ G E F D G D F D G D C)

== Film songs ==
Song	Movie	Composer	Artists
Woh Dekhen To Unki Inayat	Funtoosh	S. D. Burman	Kishore Kumar & Asha Bhosle
Leheron Mein Jhoolun	Society(1955 film)	S. D. Burman	Asha Bhosle
Jhula Jhulo Re	Ekadashi(1955 film)	Avinash Vyas	Lata Mangeshkar
Ritu Aye Ritu Jaye	Hamdard(1953 film)	Anil Biswas (composer)	Manna Dey & Lata Mangeshkar
Na Dir Deem	Pardesi (1957 film)	Anil Biswas (composer)	Lata Mangeshkar
Kuch Aur Zamana	Chhoti Chhoti Baten	Anil Biswas (composer)	Meena Kapoor
Allah Tero Naam	Hum Dono (1961 film)	Jaidev	Lata Mangeshkar & Chorus
Dekho Jadu Bhare More Naina	Aasman(1952 film)	O. P. Nayyar	Geeta Dutt

=== The Indian National Anthem's Raga ===
It is believed that the Indian national anthem "Jana Gana Mana" is sung in the raga Alhaiya Bilaval. But there is a teevra Madhyam svara being employed in the national anthem too. Raga Alhaiya Bilaval does not employ the tivra Madhyama svara; Alhaiya Bilaval is the raga of all Shuddha Svaras and no other types of svaras. So some consider the national anthem to be in raag Gaud Sarang.

== Sources ==
- Bor, Joep; Rao, Suvarnalata (1999). The Raga Guide: A Survey of 74 Hindustani Ragas. Nimbus Records with Rotterdam Conservatory of Music. p. 70. ISBN 9780954397609.
- Gauḍ Sārang Rāga (Hin), The Oxford Encyclopaedia of the Music of India. Oxford University Press. ISBN 9780195650983.
