= Kafi (thaat) =

Thaat of Hindustani music

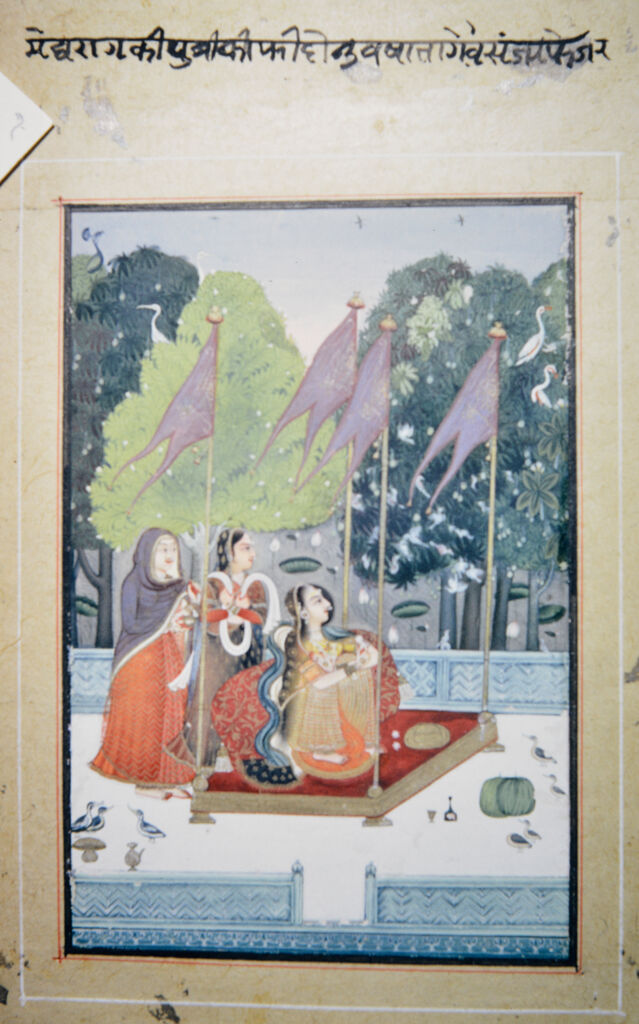
Kafi putri ca. 1725 A.D.

Kafi (IAST: Kāfi) is one of the ten basic thaats of Hindustani music from the Indian subcontinent. It is also the name of a raga (Kharaharapriya) within this thaat.

== Description ==
Kafi thaat makes use of the Komal Gandhar and Komal Nishad. So basically it adds Komal Gandhara to the Khamaj thaat. The Kafi raga is one of the oldest ragas and its intervals are described as the basic scale of the Natyashastra. Thus in ancient and medieval times, Kafi was considered as natural scale. Kafi is a late evening raga and said to convey the mood of springtime.

== Ragas ==
Ragas in Kafi thaat include:

- Abhogi
- Bageshri
- Bageshri-Ang Chandrakauns
- Bahar
- Barwa
- Bhimpalasi
- Brindavani Sarang
- Dhani
- Hanskinkini
- Jog
- Kafi
- Madhuranjani
- Megh
- Malhar
- Meghmalhar
- Nayaki Kanada
- Patdeep
- Pilu
- Jaijaiwanti
- Ramdasi Malhar
- Sahana
- Surdasi Malhar
- Ananda Sarang
- Daiva Malhar
