= Bhinna Shadja =

Hindustani raga

- Thaat: Bilaval

Bhinna Shadja is a raga of Hindustani classical music belonging to the Bilaval Thaat (Melakarta No. 29 Dheerashankarabharanam). It contains five Shuddha Swaras: Shadaja, Gandhar, Madhyama, Dhaivata, and Nishad. Rishabh and Pancham are omitted. In the form of notation it contains S, G, M, D and N.

In Carnatic music, these five swaras are termed Shadja -Sa, AntaraGandhar -ga, Suddha Madhyama- ma, Chatusruti Dhaivata -dhi and KakaliNishad –nu.

In Western classical notation, the notes are termed tonic, major third, perfect fourth, major sixth, and major seventh; i.e., C, E, F, A and B; second D and fifth G notes are omitted.

Raga Bhinna Shadja is known by many alternative names such as Koushikdhwani, or Hindoli. Same notes are used in some other ragas like Audav-Bilaval.

== Description ==
Jati (based on the number of notes used in the raga): Audava-Audava/five notes-five notes.

Aaroha: SG, MD, NS’’;

Avaroha: S’’, ND, MG, S;

Vadi (Sonant) M;

Samavadi- S.

Nyasa Swaras (resting notes) – M, S

Pakad (distinctive tonal phrase) – S’’, NDMG, MG->S

Chalan (sample melodic combinations)-

S, 'NS, 'N'D, 'M'D'N S, 'D'N SM-G, SGMDGM-G, MG->S; 'D'N SG, SGSM-G, SGMD, GMND, MG, MDNS’’, DNS’’G’’'S’’, S’’G’’M’’G’’S’’,

MDNS’’ ND, GMDNDMG, SGMDGMG->S.

Gaan Samaya (Preferred Time)- 10 p.m.-1 a.m.

== Additional information ==
Raga Bhinnashadaja of Carnatic music has a different melodic structure. However, Carnatic ragas Chandrakauns, Daka, and Dakka of Dheerasankarabharanam Melkarta are scale-congruent with Bhinnashadaja of Hindustani classical music (Ref – Raga Pravaham)

Similar ragas from Hindustani music – Rageshri, Chakradhar, and Hemant

Similar ragas from Carnatic music – Chandrakauns, Daka, and Dakka

== Popular compositions ==
- "Yaad Piyaki Aaye" - Thumri- Ustad Bade Ghulam Ali Khan
- "Zalima Coca-Cola Pila De" - Film Song – Noor Jehan
- "Tum bin jeevan kaisa jeevan" - FILM NAME Bawarchi Artist: Manna Dey
