= Barwa (raga) =

- Thaat: Kafi
- Similar: Desi

Barwa is a Hindustani classical raga. It is similar to raga Desi (raga). It is also close to raga Sindhura, but distinguishes itself in how it approaches S R m in arohi (ascending) movements and komal gandhar (g) while descending. Barwa is particularly well-loved by the Agra gharana musicians, and several recordings of Barwa can be found by veteran as well as contemporary Agra vocalists.

Thaat - kafi

Jaati - Shadav - Sampurna

Vadi Swar - रे (R )

Samvadi Swar- प (P)

Time - Third half of the morning

Aaroh - सा रे म प ध नि सां।

            S  R M P D N Ṡ

Avroh - सां नि॒ ध प म प ग॒रेग॒ सा।

            Ṡ Ṉ D P M P G̱ R G̱ S

Pakad - ग रे ग॒ सा नि सा, रे म प ध म ग रे ग॒ सा।

           G R G̱ S N S, R M P D M G R G̱ S
