= Bageshri =

Janya raga of Carnatic music

- Thaat: Kafi
- Type: Audav Shadav/ Audav-Sampurna / Shadav sampurna Or sampurna sampurna
- Time of day: 2nd Prahar of the Night (9PM to 12AM)
- Arohana: S g m D n S'
- Avarohana: S'n D m g R S Or S' n D m P D g m g R S Or S' n D,P D n D m g, R G m g R S
- Pakad: D n s, m, m P D, m g R S
- Vadi: Ma
- Samavadi: Sa
- Synonym: Vagishvari
- Similar: Rageshri

Bageshri

Raga Bageshri or Bageshree (IAST: Bāgeśrī) is a Hindustani raga. It is meant to depict the emotion of waiting for reunion with one's lover. Being a very melodic raga it has gained popularity over the centuries. Like all ragas, Raga Bageshri traces its origins to the Samaveda, a sacred Hindu text with roots that likely date back to around 1500 BCE, though its oral tradition could be much older.

Raga Bageshri is a night time raga (madhya raatri Ragsamaya), written in Kaafi thaat, Ma Vadi, Sa Samvadi, 5/7 Jati, Hasya Rasa (associated with joyful, the comic, and happy emotions).

In modern days, people like the popular Hindi music director C.Ramchandra favour composing songs in Bageshri, as he found it simple. In a 1978 interview at BBC studios with Mahendra Kaul, he explained this, while playing songs like (Radha na bole – Azad, 1955) that were set to Bageshri.

== Theory ==
The theoretical aspects of Bageshri are as follows:

=== Scale ===
Arohana : S g m D n S'
Avarohana : S' n D m P D g m g R S

=== Vadi & Samavadi ===
Vadi : Madhyam (Ma)
Samavadi: Shadja (Sa)

=== Pakad or Chalan ===
D n s, m, m P D, m g R S

Varjit Swara – P & R in Aaroh

Jati : – Audav-Sampoorna (Vakra)

=== Organization & Relationships ===
Thaat: Kafi (raga)

=== Samayā (Time) ===
The time for this raaga is madhya raatri (middle of the night).

== Carnatic music ==
Bageshri
- Mela: 22nd, Kharaharapriya
- Arohanam: S G₂ M₁ D₂ N₂ Ṡ
- Avarohanam: Ṡ N₂ D₂ N₂ P M₁ G₂ R₂ S

Bageshri raga a popular raga. It is derived from the 22nd Melakarta, Kharaharapriya. This raga is a janya raga (derived) as it does not have all the seven notes in the ascending scale.

=== Structure and Lakshana ===
Bageshri is an asymmetric scale that does not contain panchamam or rishabam in the ascending scale. It is called a audava-sampurna rāgam, in Carnatic music classification (as it has 5 notes in ascending and 7 notes in descending scale). Its ārohaṇa-avarohaṇa structure is as follows (see swaras in Carnatic music for details on below notation and terms):

- ārohaṇa : S G₂ M₁ D₂ N₂ Ṡ (Note: Alternate notations: Hindustani: S G̱ M D Ṉ Ṡ; Western: C E♭ F A B♭ C)
- avarohaṇa : Ṡ N₂ D₂ N₂ P M₁ G₂ R₂ S (Note: Alternate notations: Hindustani: Ṡ Ṉ D Ṉ P M G̱ R S; Western: C B♭ A B♭ G F E♭ D C)

This scale uses the notes shadjam, chathusruti rishabham, sadharana gandharam, shuddha madhyamam, panchamam, chathusruthi dhaivatham, and kaisiki nishadam.

=== Popular compositions ===
Bageshri is a very melodic raga in Carnatic music. So, even though this scale has been used only in a few krithis (compositions), many devaranamas, ashtapadis, thiruppugazhs, and other lyrics have been set to tune in this raga. It is typically sung in concerts after the main piece, in viruttams, padams, bhajans, and ragamalika.

== See also ==
- List of film songs based on ragas

== Sources ==
- Bor, Joep; Rao, Suvarnalata (1999). The Raga Guide: A Survey of 74 Hindustani Ragas. Nimbus Records with Rotterdam Conservatory of Music. p. 26. ISBN 978-0-9543976-0-9.
