= Bilaval (thaat) =

Thaat of Hindustani classical music

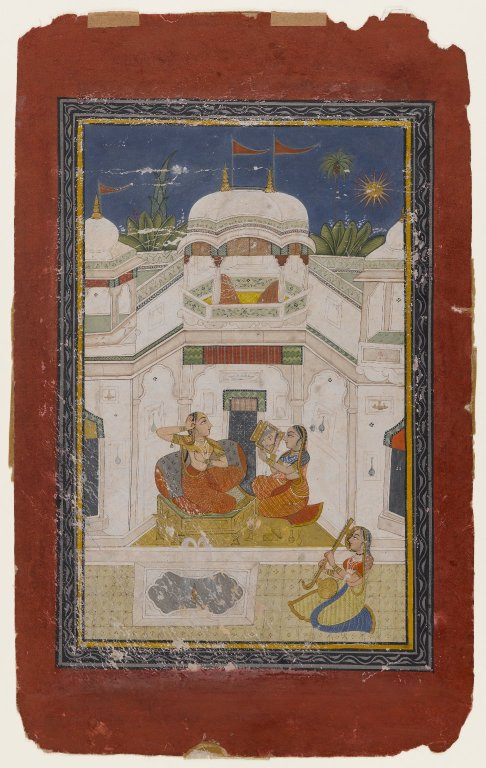
Bilavala Ragini, 1750

Bilaval or Bilawal (IAST: Bilāval) is the most basic of all the ten thaats of Hindustani classical music of the Indian subcontinent. All the swaras in the thaat are shuddha or all swaras in the natural scale. Bilaval as a raga is not rendered these days however a small variation of the raga called Alhaiya Bilaval is very common. This is a morning raga and its pictorial descriptions create a rich, sensuous ambience in consonance with its performance.

== Ragas ==
Ragas in Bilaval include:

1. Alhaiya Bilawal
2. Bhinna Shadja
3. Bihag
4. Bilaval
5. Deshkar
6. Devgiri Bilawal
7. Durga
8. Hamsadhvani
9. Hemant
10. Kukubh Bilawal
11. Shankara
12. Sukhiya
13. Shukla Bilawal
14. Pahadi
15. Mand (raga)
