= Dagar =

Dagar may refer to:

== Comics ==
- Dagar the Invincible, a comic-book series
- Dagar, the Desert Hawk, a comic-book character

== People ==
- Aminuddin Dagar (1923–2000), Indian classical singer
- Bahauddin Dagar (born 1970), Indian musician
- Mayank Dagar (born 1996), Indian cricketer
- Mukul Dagar (born 1990), Indian cricketer
- Rahim Fahimuddin Dagar (1927–2011), Indian classical singer
- Rahim-ud-in Khan Dagar (1900-1975), Indian classical singer
- Rahul Dagar (born 1993), Indian cricketer
- Satender Dagar, Indian professional wrestler
- Wasifuddin Dagar, Indian classical singer
- Zia Fariduddin Dagar, (1932–2013) Indian classical singer
- Zia Mohiuddin Dagar (1929–1990), Indian classical musician
- Younger Dagar Brothers, Ustad Nasir Zahiruddin (1933–1994) and Ustad Nasir Faiyazuddin (1934–1989), Indian classical singers

== Other uses ==
- Dagar vani, a stylized singing style in India
- Malana Dagar, a village in Punjab Province, Pakistan
- Röda dagar, a 2013 Erik Linder Christmas album
- Dagar som kommer och går, a 1998 album by Swedish band Kikki Danielssons orkester

== See also ==
- Dagar Brothers (disambiguation)
- Daggar, Pakistan, a city in Khyber Pakhtunkhwa
- Dagara (disambiguation)
- Dogar (disambiguation)
