= Wasifuddin Dagar =

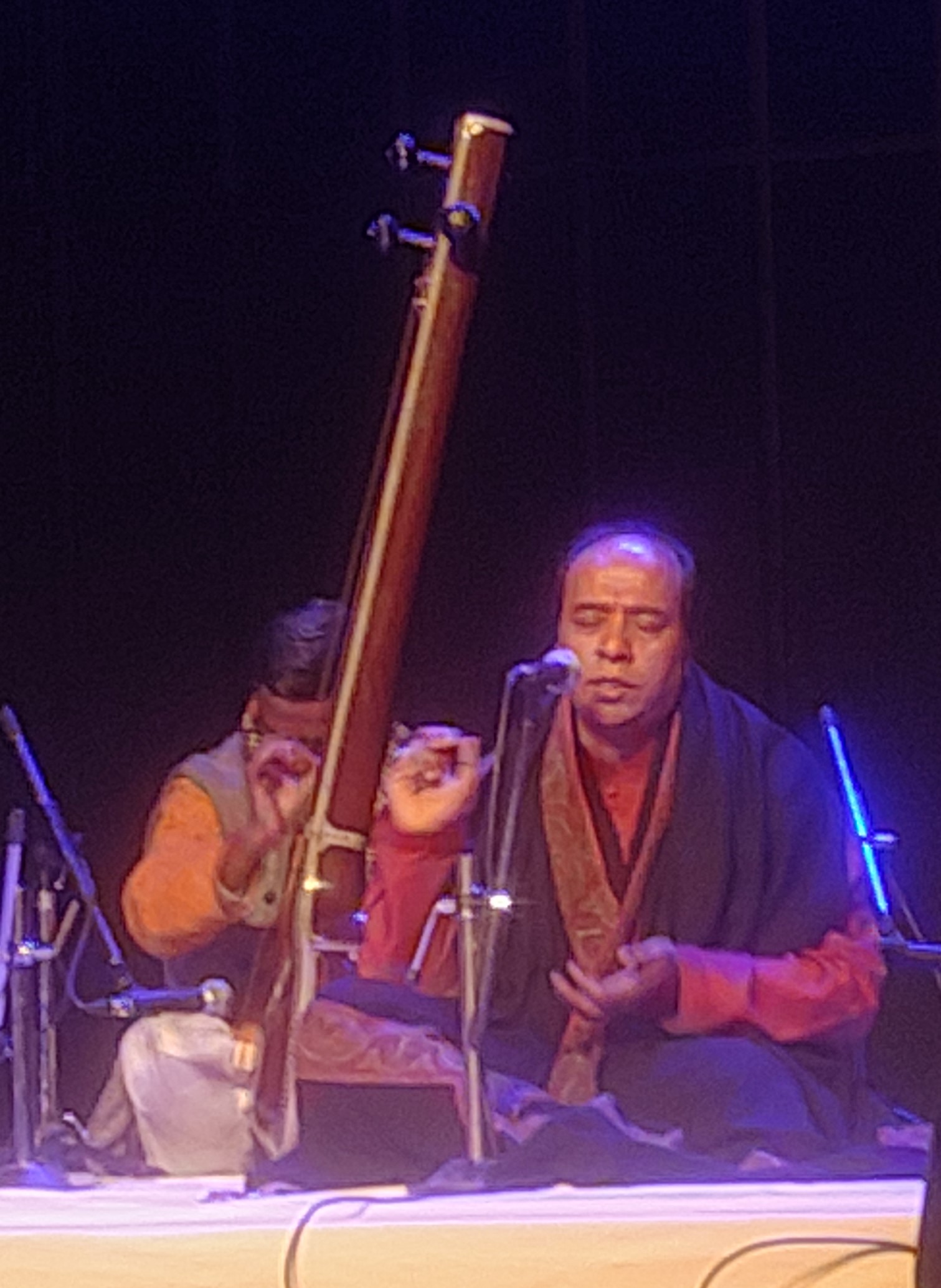
- Wasifuddin Dagar is performing Dhrupad at India Habitat Centre on 5 January 2023.

Background information
- Born: Faiyaz Wasifuddin Dagar; 22 April 1968 (age 57); New Delhi
- Origin: India
- Occupation: Singer Hindustani classical music

Faiyaz Wasifuddin Dagar (born 22 April 1968) is an Indian classical singer of the dhrupad genre and the son of dhrupad singer Nasir Faiyazuddin Dagar. Since the death of his father and later, his uncle, Wasifuddin has been singing solo. He was awarded the Padma Shri in 2010.

== Life and training ==
Wasifuddin Dagar is the son of Nasir Faiyazuddin Dagar, and the nephew of Nasir Zahiruddin Dagar, of the Dagar vani.

Dagar received most of his training under his father, and younger uncle, the Junior Dagar Brothers, since he was five years old. Additionally he has had opportunity to receive instructions from his grand uncle, A. Rahimuddin Dagar, his elder uncle, Nasir Aminuddin Dagar (who, along with Nasir Moinuddin Dagar, comprised the Senior Dagar Brothers), as well as some of his cousin uncles, Zia Fariduddin Dagar, Rahim Fahimuddin Dagar and H. Sayeeduddin Dagar.

Between 1989 and 1994, he was trained Zahiruddin Dagar, with whom he used to sing jugalbandis (duets).

== Major recordings ==
Wasifuddin Dagar's public career began on 25 February 1989, a few days after his father's death, when he gave his first performance. He sang with Zahiruddin Dagar. Wasifuddin's first major recordings were in Switzerland, India and Japan, in 1992. He has since recorded in Switzerland, India, and America with major recording labels. A French television company made a film based on their life and music.

Wasifuddin Dagar has toured North America performing dhrupad solo since 2000. He first performed live in New York in 2000, where he gave a rendition of raga Bihag. He has since performed at the UN, the Smithsonian Institutions, Yale, the City of Chicago, University of Washington, Seattle, Stanford University, University of California, Los Angeles, and several other prestigious venues.
