= Dagar vani =

Tradition of the Dhrupad music genre of Northern India

The Dagar vani is a tradition of the classical dhrupad genre of Hindustani classical music spanning 20 generations, tracing back to Swami Haridas (15th century), and including Behram Khan of Jaipur (1753-1878). For some generations its members were associated with the courts of Jaipur, Udaipur, and Mewar.

The Dagar vani is characterized by an exposition of alap-jor-jhala that emphasizes microtonal inflections and the specific characteristics of the raga.

Until the 20th century, it was exclusively a vocal genre (at least in performance), but since the innovations of Zia Mohiuddin Dagar to the rudra vina, that instrument has found a place in performance, following closely the inflections and style of the vocal technique.

The genre was carried into the 20th century by seven Dagar brothers and cousins: Aminuddin Dagar and Nasir Moinuddin (Senior Dagar Brothers), Rahim Fahimuddin Dagar, Nasir Zaheeruddin and Nasir Fayyazuddin (Junior Dagar Brothers), H. Sayeeduddin Dagar, and the brothers Zia Mohiuddin Dagar and Zia Fariduddin Dagar. Zia Mohiuddin (rudra vina) and Zia Fareeduddin (vocal) were largely responsible for training today's practitioners, the most prominent of whom include Ritwik Sanyal, Pushparaj Koshti, Wasifuddin Dagar, Bahauddin Dagar, Asit Kumar Banerjee, Uday Bhawalkar, and the Gundecha Brothers.

Claims of descent from Swami Haridas notwithstanding, the musical style and pedagogy of the Dagar vani in its current form is understood to have originated with Behram Khan, who learned music not from within a family tradition but from Kalidas Dagur in Banaras. Behram Khan then intensively trained Zakiruddin and Allabande Khan, the grandsons of his older brother. The internationally-renowned 20th- and 21st-century exponents of the style are the descendents of Zakiruddin and Allabande.

While the term Dagar vani today often signifies the members of this particular family and their students, historically in the context of dhrupad, "vani" or "bani" denotes one of the four overarching stylistic orientations rather than any specific lineage. For example, Alladiya Khan and his Jaipur-Atrauli gharana are also understood to be rooted in the Dagar vani, with some elements of Gauhar and Khandar vani, but his line of descent and discipleship does not overlap with that of Behram Khan.

== Family pedagogy ==
This visualization is based on several historical accounts.

Haridas Dagar
Imam Baksh; Khan Dagar
Haider Khan; Dagar	Behram Khan; Dagar
Mohammad Ali; Khan Dagar	Mohammad Jan; Khan Dagar	Saddu Khan; Dagar	Akbar Khan; Dagar
Zakiruddin Khan; Dagar	Allah Bande; Khan Dagar	Inayat Khan; Dagar "Satshatri"
Ziauddin; Dagar	Nasiruddin; Dagar	Rahimuddin; Dagar	Imamuddin; Dagar	Hussainuddin; Dagar	Riyazuddin; Khan Dagar
Mohiuddin; Dagar	Fariduddin; Dagar	Shaffiuddin; Dagar	Sayiduddin; Dagar	Moinuddin; Dagar	Aminuddin; Dagar	Zahiruddin; Dagar	Faiyazuddin; Dagar	Fahimuddin; Dagar	Alimuddin; Dagar	Shamimuddin; Dagar	Nizamuddin; Dagar	Qayamuddin; Dagar	Sayeeduddin; Dagar
Bahauddin; Dagar	Saleemuddin; Dagar	Wasifuddin; Dagar	Imranuddin; Dagar	Javeduddin; Dagar	Wasimuddin; Dagar	Sameeruddin; Dagar	Mohsinuddin; Dagar	Roshanuddin; Dagar	Nafeesuddin; Dagar	Aneesuddin; Dagar
Saifuddin; Dagar

== Exponents ==
=== 15th century ===
- Swami Haridas Dagar

=== 16th century ===
- Gadadhar Pandey alias Masnad Ali Khan Dagar
- Gyandhar Pandey alias Surgyan Khan Dagar

=== 17th century ===
- Rahim Baksh Khan Dagar, father and guru of Baba Gopal Das.

=== 18th century ===
- Baba Gopal Das alias Imam Baksh Khan Dagar (c. 1720 - c. 1800)
- Haider Khan Dagar (1750-1830), son and disciple of Baba Gopal Das.
- Behram Khan Dagar (1753-1878), son and disciple of Baba Gopal Das.
- Addan Khan (c. 1750s - c. 1800s), daughter and disciple of Baba Gopal Das.

=== 19th century ===
- Mohammed Jan Khan Dagar (1795-1850), son and disciple of Haider Khan Dagar.
- Mohammad Ali Khan Dagar (c. 1800 - c. 1870), son and disciple of Haider Khan Dagar.
- Akbar Khan, son and disciple of Behram Khan Dagar.
- Saddu Khan (1800-1860), son and disciple of Behram Khan Dagar.
- Bande Ali Khan (1826-1890), learned from maternal uncle Behram Khan Dagar.
- Inayat Khan Dagar (1835-1900), son and disciple of Saddu Khan Dagar.
- Zakiruddin Khan Dagar (1840-1923), son and disciple of Mohammed Jan Khan Dagar.
- Allabande Khan Dagar (1845-1927), son and disciple of Mohammed Ali Khan Dagar.
- Haider Khan of Dhar, disciple of Behram Khan Dagar.

=== 20th century ===
- Riazuddin Khan Dagar (1885-1947), son and disciple of Inayat Khan Dagar.
- Ziauddin Khan Dagar (1886-1946), son and disciple of Zakiruddin Khan Dagar.
- Nasiruddin Dagar (1895-1936), son and disciple of Allabande Khan Dagar.
- Rahimuddin Dagar (1900-1975), son and disciple of Allabande Khan Dagar.
- Imamuddin Dagar (1903-1966), son and disciple of Allabande Khan Dagar.
- Hussainuddin Dagar (1906-1963), son and disciple of Allabande Khan Dagar.
- Nasir Moinuddin Dagar (1921-1967), son and disciple of Nasiruddin Dagar. With brother Aminuddin, known as Senior Dagar Brothers.
- Nasir Aminuddin Dagar (1923-2000), son and disciple of Nasiruddin Dagar. With brother Moinuddin, known as Senior Dagar Brothers.
- Rahim Fahimuddin Dagar (1927-2011), son and disciple of Rahimuddin Dagar.
- Zia Mohiuddin Dagar (1929-1990), son and disciple of Ziauddin Dagar.
- Nasir Zahiruddin Dagar (1932-1994), son and disciple of Nasiruddin Dagar. With brother Faiyazuddin, known as Junior Dagar Brothers.
- Zia Fariuddin Dagar (1932-2013), son and disciple of Ziauddin Dagar.
- Nasir Faiyazuddin Dagar (1934-1989), son and disciple of Nasiruddin Dagar. With brother Zahiruddin, known as Junior Dagar Brothers.
- Chandrashekar Naringrekar (1936-2004), disciple of Zia Mohiduddin Dagar.
- Asit Kumar Banerjee (b. 19370, disciple of Zia Mohiuddin Dagar.
- H. Sayeeduddin Dagar (1939-2017), son and disciple of Hussainuddin Dagar.
- Shantha Benegal (b. 1942), disciple of Zia Mohiuddin Dagar.
- Jody Stecher (b. 1946), disciple of Zia Mohiuddin Dagar.
- Pushpraj Koshti (b. 1951), disciple of Zia Mohiuddin Dagar.
- Ritwik Sanyal (b. 1953), disciple of Zia Mohiuddin Dagar and Zia Fariduddin Dagar.
- Umakant Gundecha (b. 1959), disciple of Zia Fariduddin Dagar.
- Ramakant Gundecha (1962-2019), disciple of Zia Fariduddin Dagar.
- Uday Bhawalkar (b. 1966), disciple of Zia Fariduddin Dagar and Zia Mohiuddin Dagar.
- F. Wasifuddin Dagar (b. 1968), son and disciple of Nasir Faiyazuddin Dagar.
- Mohi Bahauddin Dagar (b. 1970), son and disciple of Zia Mohiuddin Dagar.
- Sayeed Nafeesuddin Dagar (b. 1975), son and disciple of H. Sayeeduddin Dagar.
- Sayeed Aneesuddin Dagar (b. 1976), son and disciple of H. Sayeeduddin Dagar.

=== 21st century ===
- Pelva Naik (b. 1986), disciple of Zia Fariduddin Dagar and Mohi Bahauddin Dagar.
- Anant Gundecha (b. 1996), son and disciple of Ramakant Gundecha.
