= Dhrupad Kendra Bhopal =

- Formation: 1981
- Purpose: To impart training in Dhrupad using the traditional Guru Shishya system of learning.
- Headquarters: Ustad Alauddin Khan Sangeet Evam Kala Akademi Ravindranath Thakur Marg Bhoppal 462003 Madhya Pradesh
- Director/Guru: Ashish Sankrityayan
- Parent organization: Ustad Alauddin Khan Sangeet Evam Kala Academy

The Dhrupad Kendra Bhopal (Devanāgarī: ध्रुपद केन्द्र भोपाल) is an institution for training Dhrupad singers, established by the Government of Madhya Pradesh in the state capital Bhopal in 1981 to impart training in the Indian teacher-apprentice or Guru-shishya tradition of education in Dhrupad one of the oldest surviving genres of Indian classical music.

== History ==
The Dhrupad Kenra was established by the Department of Culture of the Government of Madhya Pradesh in the State Capital Bhopal in 1981 as a result of the efforts of noted Hindi poet and bureaucrat Ashok Vajpeyi who was then the Secretary of Culture of State and noted film maker Mani Kaul. At a meeting at the Cannes Film Festival the two persuaded renowned Dhrupad exponent of the Dagar style Zia Fariduddin Dagar, who had then virtually settled in Europe, to return to India and assume the directorship of the Dhrupad Kendra since it was felt at that time that the ancient Dhrupad tradition was on the verge of extinction and capable bearers of the tradition needed to be trained outside the University system of education using the traditional guru shisya system within an institutionalized set up. A committee of eminent persons was appointed and it was decided that students would be trained in the traditional system in batches each lasting a period of four years supported by a small scholarship from the State.

== Functioning and teaching methodology ==
To train performers in the prescribed short period of four years Zia Fariduddin Dagar developed innovative new methods of teaching that departed from the orthodox traditional system. He considerably shortened the long period of initial technical training and quickly went on to teaching alap, compositions and improvisation in a very rigorous and demanding process of teaching, intensive practice and constant correction and supervision. Rahim Fahimuddin Dagar the elder cousin of Zia Fariduddin Dagar remained skeptical about the experiment preferring the slow and long orthodox traditional system of teaching of his family which lay emphasis on many years of technical grounding using technical exercises before starting training of Dhrupad alap, compositions, improvisation and the shastra or the conceptual foundations of the art.

== Students ==
The Dhrupad Kendra has trained a large number of students in the traditional system since its inception. Students of the Dhrupad Kendra who perform regularly in concerts today are Uday Bhawalkar, Umakant and Ramakant Gundecha (The Gundecha Brothers) from the first batch of students, Afzal Hussain, Ashish Sankrityayan, Manoj and Sulbha Saraf (The Dhrupad Duo), Sombala Kumar from the second batch, Lakhan Lal Sahu, Sulekha Kamble from the third batch, Pallab Das, Rajesh Sendh, Vishal Jain from the fourth batch and Amit Sharma Bandhavi from the fifth batch. Dhrupad vocalists Nirmalya Dey and Abhijeet Sukhdane also studied independently at the Kendra from Zia Fariduddin Dagar. The Kendra also admits exceptional students who do not meet the admissions criteria from time to time on a non-scholarship basis.

== Directors of the Dhrupad Kendra after Zia Fariduddin Dagar ==
In the early 2010s Zia Fariduddin Dagar started dividing his time between Mumbai and Bhopal, teaching also at the newly established Dhrupad Sansar, Cell for Human Values at the Indian Institute of Technology Bombay. He remained the director of the Dhrupad Kendra till his resignation in 2007 after which for a period of two years the Kendra was headed by Abhay Narayan Mallik renowned Dhrupad singer of the Darbhanga style. Since 2011 the Kendra is headed by Dagar tradition dhrupad singer Ashish Sankrityayan who had studied at the Dhrupad Kendra under Zia Faridduddin Dagar and later from his elder cousin Rahim Fahimuddin Dagar. Ashish Sankrityayan has in his teaching method at the Dhrupad Kendra combined the new teaching methods developed by Zia Fariduddin Dagar with the orthodox traditional system taught by Rahim Fahimuddin Dagar. The students of the Dhrupad Kendra Bhopal batch that started training in December 2011 performed at the renowned Tansen Samaroh music festival in Gwalior in 2012 and 2013. The Dhrupad Kendra Bhopal is administered by the Ustad Alauddin Khan Sangeet Evam Kala Academy of the Madhya Pradesh Government.

== Centers at Tikamgarh and Gwalior ==
In 1999 the Government of Madhya Pradesh started another center for traditional teaching of Dhrupad at Tikamgarh called the Maharaja Vir Singhjudeo Dhrupad Kendra in honour of Vir Singh Deo the former King of the Orchha State, where the famed female Dhrupad singer Asgari Bai taught till her death in 2006. The Center was subsequently reopened two years after her death and eventually shifted to Gwalior and is presently headed by Dhrupad singer Abhijeet Sukhdane.

== See also ==
- Hindustani classical music
- Bhopal
- Madhya Pradesh
