= H. Sayeeduddin Dagar =

Ustad Hussain Sayeeduddin Dagar
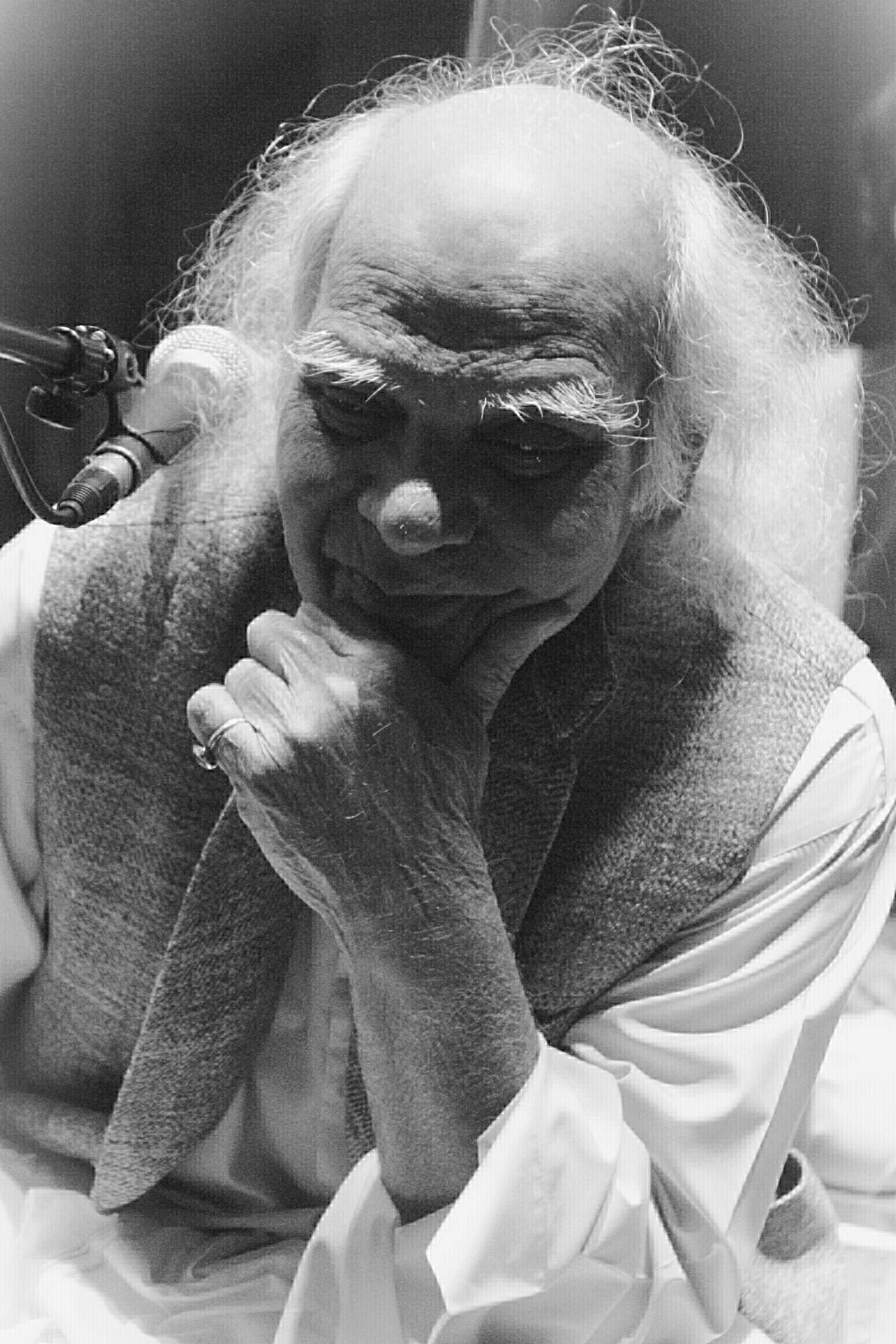
- H. Sayeeduddin Dagar in 2017

Background information
- Also known as: Saeed Bhai
- Born: 20 April 1939; Alwar, Rajasthan, India
- Origin: India
- Died: 30 July 2017 (aged 78) Pune
- Genre: Dhrupad
- Occupation: Vocalist

Ustad Hussain Sayeeduddin Dagar (20 April 1939 – 30 July 2017), popularly known as Saeed Bhai, was an Indian classical vocalist belonging to the Dhrupad tradition, the oldest existing form of north Indian classical music (Hindustani classical music). He was a part of the Dagar family of musicians. He represented the 19th generation of Dagar Tradition. His cousins Nasir Moinuddin Dagar and Nasir Aminuddin Dagar were known as the Senior Dagar Brothers. Similarly, Nasir Zahiruddin and Nasir Faiyazuddin Dagar were known as the Younger Dagar Brothers. His other cousins were Zia Mohiuddin Dagar, Zia Fariduddin Dagar, and Rahim Fahimuddin Dagar. He performed in the famous Bharat Ek Khoj.

== Biography ==
Born in Alwar, Rajasthan in 1939 into the Dagar family, Hussain Sayeeduddin Khan Dagar is the son of Hussainuddin Khan Dagar who died in 1963. Among the Dagar family, also known as the 'Dagar saptak', he was the last representative of the 19th generation of the Dagar lineage. He began his training at age 6 under his father Ustad Hussainuddin Khan Dagar, and later his uncle, Ustad Rahimuddin Khan Dagar. He had been the President of Dhrupad Society Jaipur and Pune.

Hussain Sayeeduddin Khan Dagar resided in Pune.
