= Dagar Brothers =

The Dagar Brothers also known as Dagar Bandhu are one of two generations of singers of the Indian classical music vocal genre dhrupad:

- Senior Dagar Brothers, Nasir Moinuddin Dagar (1919–1966) and Nasir Aminuddin Dagar (1923–2000)
- Younger Dagar Brothers, Zahiruddin Dagar (1933–1994) and Faiyazuddin Dagar (1934–1989)

== See also ==
- Category:Dagarvani, including articles on other members of the Dagar family
