= Mallick Brothers =

Indian classical musicians

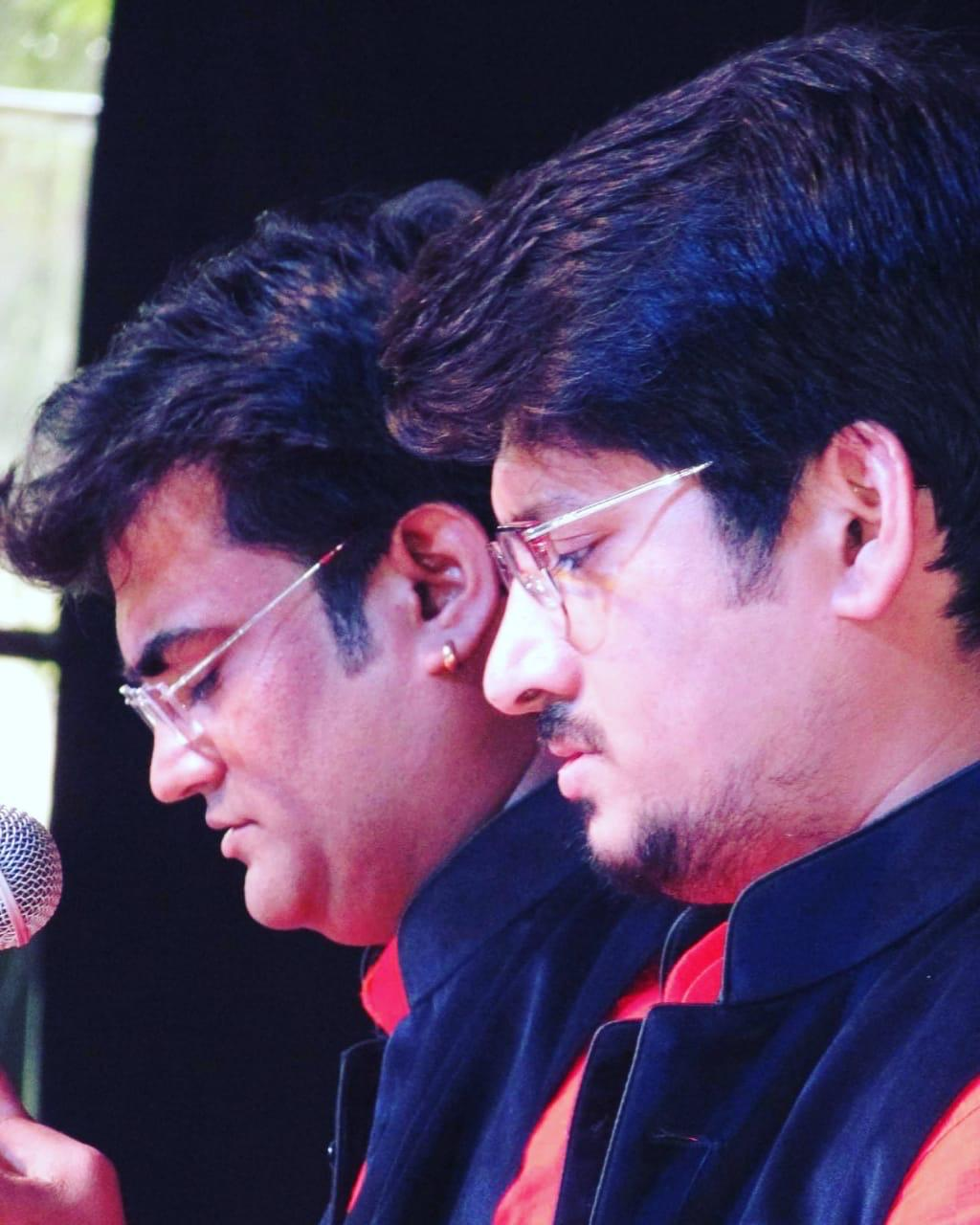
- Pandit Prashant Mallick (Left) and Pandit Nishant Mallick (Right)
- Other names: Mallick Bandhu Prashant Mallick and Nishant Mallick
- Occupation: Indian Classical musician
- Years active: 1999–present
- Known for: Hindustani music, Dhrupad
- Parent: Pandit Prem Kumar Mallick
- Awards: Ustad Bismillah Khan Yuva Puraskar
- Website: dhrupadmusic.org

Mallick Brothers are Indian classical musicians from the Darbhanga gharana of the Dhrupad tradition, one of the oldest genres of Hindustani vocal music. Composed of brothers Pandit Prashant Mallick and Pandit Nishant Mallick, sons of Pandit Prem Kumar Mallick.

They were honoured by the Sangeet Natak Akademi in 2013-2014 with Ustad Bismillah Khan Yuva Puraskar.

== Biography ==
Mallick Brothers are from 13th generation of Darbhanga Gharana. They are presently considered one of the powerful exponents of Dhrupad tradition, both nationally and internationally.

They both have been trained under their father Pandit Prem Kumar Mallick, and grandfather Late Pandit Vidur Mallick. They belong to Mallick family of musicians, where the legends like Padma Shri Pandit Ram Chatur Mallick have created the aura of Gauharbani and Khandarbani style.

Apart from performances India and abroad, they also sang a song 'Amrita Narmada' in Raag Basant in hindi movie Who Am I (2023).

== Singing style ==
The duo are known for their soulful voice with depth, and elaboration of four stages of Alaap and rhythmic improvisation (Layakari) in different meters (Laya) of music. They sing traditionally, accompanied by a pakhawaj player. One of the prime characteristics in their singing is the smooth glide from one note to another, also called meend and soot. Both of them have introduced a new repertoire of bandishes in Darbhanga Gharana, by singing poetic renditions of ancient poets like Kabir Das to modern poets like Ashok Jamnani.

== Awards ==
- Ustad Bismillah Khan Yuva Puraskar, Sangeet Natak Akademi, 2013-2014
- Top grade, All India Radio and Doordarshan
- Bihar Kala Puraskar

== Discography ==
- Eternal Bliss. Bihaan Music. 2014

== See also ==
- Dhrupad
- Hindustani music
