= Falguni Mitra =

Hindustani classical vocalist

Pandit Falguni Mitra
- Born: 1 March 1942 (age 83); Chittagong
- Citizenship: Indian
- Education: Master of Arts, Philosophy, Psychology
- Alma mater: St. Xaviers College, Kolkata
- Occupation: Hindustani classical vocalist
- Known for: Dhrupad, Dhamar
- Style: Alaap, Dhrupad and Dhamar
- Television: Raag Rang, National Doordarshan
- Title: Pandit
- Spouse: Pratima Mitra
- Children: 1
- Honours: Dhrupad Ratna, Ballava Gandharva, Sangeet Ratna

Pandit Falguni Mitra is an Indian Hindustani classical vocalist who is known as a Dhrupad exponent of India. Mitra belongs to the Bettiah gharana.

Mitra combines the Dagar style of “Alaapchari” with the Betia style of Dhrupad and Dhamar (music).

== Early life ==
Pandit Falguni Mitra was initiated into music by his father, Sangeetacharya Shib Mitra, at the age of five.

== Education and work ==
Falguni Mitra completed his Intermediate from St. Xaviers College, Kolkata; Bachelor's Degree from Vivekananda College, University of Madras and then earned a master's degree in Philosophy from the University of Madras.

Mitra had a career in management with a multinational, Cookson Group PLC. Along with his professional career, he also pursued music and took it to an extent which was to be soon recognized as his own rendition of Dhrupad, in India and across the world.

Pandit Falguni Mitra was the Guru and Prefect of ITC Sangeet Research Academy, Kolkata from 1999 to 2010.

Mitra has conducted lecture-demonstrations and written articles in journals in India and also abroad.

== Music career ==
Pandit Falguni Mitra is a performer in the Indian music circuit. He is known for his mastery in the Dhrupad style of the Betia Banaras Gharana along with the Dagar alap style. He sings alap, nomtom and Dhrupad compositions in all the four Banis, namely, Gaurhar, Dagur, Nauhar and Khandar. He avoids splitting the words during upaj and thereby preserves the poetic integrity of those compositions. He is also known to sing many rare ragas in the Dhrupad style.

== Some memorable performances ==
- ‘Tansen Sangeet Sammelan‘, Kolkata, 1956
- ‘Sangeet Rasika Sabha', New Delhi Kali Bari, 1957
- ‘Sadarang Sangeet Sammelan’, Kolkata, 1963
- ‘Sarba Bharatiya Sangeet Sammelan’, Kolkata, 1963, 1965
- ‘Bhawanipore Sangeet Sammilani’, Kolkata, 1963, 1966, 1969, 1972, 1978, 1981, 1995, 1999, 2000, 2001, 2002, 2003
- ‘Sursringar Sammelan‘, Mumbai, 1976
- ‘Sursagar Society Sangeet Sammelan’, Kolkata, 1975, 1977, 1979. 1980, 1982, 1985, 1990, 1995, 2000
- ‘Akhil Bharatiya Dhrupad Sammelan’, Varanasi, 1976, 1977, 1979, 2000, 2005, 2010, 2011
- ‘Tansen Sangeet Samaroah‘, Raipur, 1978
- ‘Akhil Bharatiya Dhmpad Sammelan‘, Nathdwara, Rajasthan, 1981
- ‘Kalakshetra Art Festival’, Kalakshetra Foundation, Chennai, 1984
- ‘Tansen Sangeet Sammelan‘, Chennai, 1986, 1987, 1988, 1989
- ‘Ustad Chand Khan Memorial Conference’, New Delhi 1995
- ‘West Bengal State Music Academy Conference, Kolkata, 1997, 1998, 1999, 2000, 2001, 2003, 2006, 2008, 2010
- ‘Dover Lane Music Conference‘, Kolkata, 2000, 2002
- ‘Sangeet Research Academy Music Circle’, Kolkata, 2000
- ‘Salt Lake Music Conference‘, Kolkata, 2000
- ‘Bangiya Sangeet Parishad Music Conference’, Kolkata, 2002
- lTC Sangeet Research Academy Conference, Raipur, Kanpur, 2004
- Indian Council for Cultural Relations, Kolkata, 2007
- lTC Sangeet Research Academy Conference, Mumbai, 2008
- Sangeet Natak Akademi Conference, Bangalore, 2009
- Sangeet Natak Akademi Conference, Brindavan, 2010
- Prakriti Foundation Gharana Festival, Chennai, 2010
- Kala Prakash music festival, Varanasi, 2010
- Tansen Sangeet Samaroah, Gwalior, 2010
- Eastern Zone Cultural Center, Kolkata, 2011
- Classical Music programme organised by Bharatiya Bhasha Parishad and Rotary Club (Kolkata) on 15 October 2012 at Parishad Sabhaghar
- Aesthetics of Music organized by Bharatiya Vidya Bhawan, Kolkata in April 2022.
- 32nd Annual Musical Festival of Sangeet Piyasi, December 2023

== Notable works ==
- Program in collaboration with Smt. S. Sowmya on original Hindustani and Carnatic songs followed by Rabindranath Tagore's compositions on the same, Music Academy, Chennai. 1996
- Pandit Mitra composed music for Smt. Rukmini Devi Arundale, dance ballet Meera of Mewar at Kalakshetra Foundation, Chennai, 1985.
- Artist at Prakriti Foundation

== Honors ==
- Honoured and Felicitated by Behala Sanskritik Sammelani at Behala Music Conference on 11 January 2024
- Honoured by Sangeet Piyasi on their 32nd Anniversary Programme on 2 December 2023
- Honoured by Dakshin Srijani (Vidushi Dipali Nag Foundation) on 3 March 2023
- Honoured with "Girija Shankar Award" by West Bengal Rajya Sangeet Academy for his contribution in Hindustani Classical Music in 2022
- Honoured "Sangeet Bharati" by Sri Satyananda Mahapith, Jadavpur, Kolkata on 26 February 2016
- Felicitated by Baba Allauddin Khan Memorial Foundation, Kolkata in September 2015
- Honoured "Sangeet Ratna Alankaran" by Sree Kashi Sangeet Samaj, Varanasi on 19 February 2012
- Honoured by the South Madras Cultural Association, Chennai on 3 March 1996.

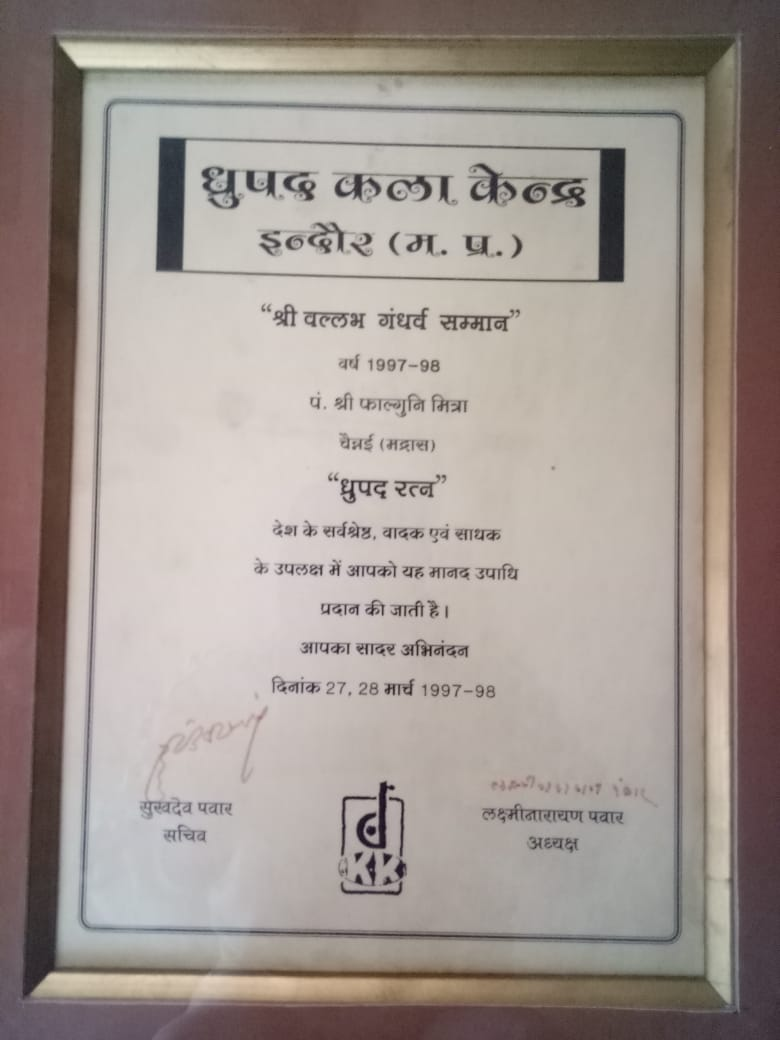
Dhrupad Ratna by Dhrupad Kalakendra, Indore.

- Honoured Dhrupad Ratna by Dhrupad Kala Kendra, Indore on 28 March 1998.
- Ballava Gandharva
