= Sombala Kumar =

Indian Dhrupad Singer

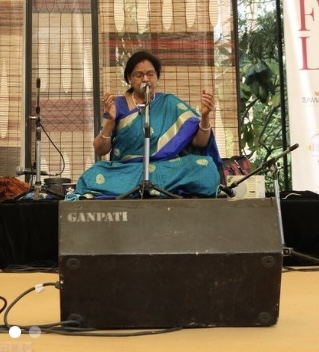
Sombala Kumar at Jaipur Literature Festival 2023

Sombala Kumar is a Dhrupad vocalist of India. She studied with Ustad Zia Fariduddin Dagar, a singer of the 19th generation of the dynasty of Dagar Gharana. She also studied with Ustad Zia Mohiuddin Dagar.

== Career ==
Kumar first studied from Shri. M.D. Raje and Shri. M.K. Kwathekar of Khandwa. Sombala Kumar holds a master's degree in Classical Music from Dr. Hari Singh Gaur University, Sagar (M.P.), which she topped upon graduation. Thereafter, she got a scholarship for four years from Ustad Allaudin Khan Sangeet Academy, Bhopal to learn Dhrupad. Thereupon she took her taleem in Dhrupad singing from Ustaad Zia Fariduddin Dagar and Ustaad Zia Mohiuddin Dagar. She worked in musicals for theatre in the early stages for her career. In the musical Kabira Khada Bazaar Mein she was noticed and commended by several eminent artists for taking gamak, a very difficult vocal instrument, in the absence of a pakhawaj. She was recognised by SPIC MACAY and All India Radio as a top grade artist. She was also the first woman Dhrupad artist to perform in Bhopal. Sombala Kumar has been a visiting fellow and visiting professor of Voice Culture and Dhrupad at Indira Kala Sangeet University, Khairagarh, which she left on 31 July 2023. Sombala Kumar now runs a Gurukula in Pune.

== Personal life ==
Sombala Kumar is married to Pakhawaj maestro and top grade artist (certified by All India Radio and SPIC MACAY) Prithviraj Kumar. They have one daughter, Ananya Jha, who is a lawyer.

== Awards and accolades ==
In 2017, Sombala Kumar rejected her nomination for the Padma Shri.

'They [Government of Chhattisgarh] told me that they were nominating me for Padma Shri. No! Who are the people who hand out these awards? Do they know music? Can they sing? How can I accept appreciation from people who have no idea about my field? - Sombala Kumar'
