= Jody Stecher =

American singer and musician (born 1946)

- Born: Jonathan Allan Stecher; June 1, 1946 (age 80); Brooklyn, New York, United States
- Occupations: Singer, musician
- Instruments: Banjo, mandolin, fiddle, guitar, sursringar
- Years active: 1973–present
- Website: jodyandkate.com

Jonathan Allan "Jody" Stecher (born June 1, 1946) is an American singer and musician. He is best known as a bluegrass and old time musician, playing banjo, mandolin, fiddle and guitar and two of his albums with Kate Brislin have been finalists for the Grammy Award for Best Traditional Folk Album. He also plays sursringar (a relative of the sarod) in the Dagar gharana tradition of dhrupad.

== Early life ==
Jonathan Allan Stecher was born on June 1, 1946, in Brooklyn, New York. At the age of twelve he found a dusty fretless Gatcomb banjo in an antique shop and bought it for two dollars. After gaining a solid grounding in bluegrass, cajun, blues and Scottish folk music, he studied Hindustani classical music for 3 years with Ali Akbar Khan and for 10 years with Zia Mohiuddin Dagar.

== Musical career ==
He has collaborated with Krishna Bhatt on an unusual album of fusion music, Rasa (1982). He met Kate Brislin (a former member of Any Old Time String Band) in 1974, and they started performing actively as a duo in 1985; they married on 29 July 1987. He is regarded as one of the leading traditional folk artists in America, and his recordings have served a large and diverse group of musicians, including Jerry Jeff Walker, Jerry Garcia, David Grisman, Peter Rowan, Martin Simpson, Seldom Scene, Laurie Lewis, Kathy Kallick, Alasdair Fraser and Hot Rize. He has also written liner notes for many albums.

He recorded the field recordings (with Peter K. Siegel) and wrote the liner notes for the record The Real Bahamas.

Stecher has been twice nominated for a Grammy with his wife Kate: in 1993 for Our Town (Best Traditional Folk Album), and again in 1998 for Heart Songs: The Old Time Country Songs of Utah Phillips (Best Traditional Folk Album of 1997). More recently he has devoted albums to singing traditional folk songs.

== Discography ==
=== Solo albums ===
- Snake Baked a Hoecake (1974)
- Going Up on the Mountain (1977)
- Oh the Wind and Rain (1999)
- Wonders & Signs (2012)
- Dreams from the Overlook, 2 CDs (2020)

=== With Krishna Bhatt ===
- Rasa (1981)

=== With Kate Brislin ===
- A Song That Will Linger (1989)
- Blue Lightning (1991)
- Our Town (1993)
- Stay Awhile (1995)
- Heart Songs: The Old Time Country Songs of Utah Phillips (1997)
- Songs of the Carter Family (2000)
- Return (2010)

=== With Alasdair Fraser ===
- The Driven Bow (1989)

=== With Perfect Strangers ===
- Perfect Strangers (2003)

=== With Mile Twelve ===
- Mile 77 (2023)
- Instant Lonesome and the Twinkle Brigade (2024)
