= Darbhanga gharana =

Darbhanga gharana is a gharana, or tradition, of the Hindustani classical music dhrupad thought to have been started in the eighteenth century by Radhakrishna and Kartaram, musicians in the court of the Maharaja of Darbhanga. The style is notable for its vocal delivery and energetic performances, as well how the songs are sung after the alap. Notable singers of the Darbhanga gharana include Ram Chatur Mallick, Pt.Abhay Narayan Mallick, Pt.Sanjay Kumar Mallick, Siyaram Tiwari, Pandit Vidur Mallick, Padma Shri Pt. Ram Kumar Mallick, Pt Raghuveer Mallick ,Pt. Prem Kumar Mallik, Santosh Kumar Mallick, Pt. Samit Kumar Mallick, Sahitya Mallick, Sangeet Mallick, Pt. Prashant Mallick & Pt. Nishant Mallick collectively known as Mallick Brothers, Dr. Priyanka Mallick.

== History ==
The tradition was prominent at the start of the twentieth century, but started to decline after India gained its independence. Pt. Abhay Narayan Mallick, Pt. Sanjay Kumar Mallick, Pandit Siyaram Tiwari are considered by many musicians of Darbhanga gharana to have embodied its essence. In 2019 a centenary concert was held in his memory in August 2019 as part of an attempt to revitalise the tradition.

== Style ==
Darbhanga gharana is based on the Gauharvani (Shuddha vani) & Khandarvani of dhrupad and is unique in that it has equal balance between the alap, or opening section, and the bandish instead of emphasising the alap as is typical in other dhrupad gharanas.
