= Gopalkrishna Bhobe =

Indian art critic and author (1920–1968)

- Born: 6 August 1920; Nerul, Bardez, Portuguese Goa
- Died: 13 February 1968 (aged 47); Margao, Goa, India
- Occupations: Art critic, author, and painter

Gopalkrishna Bhobe (6 August 1920 – 13 February 1968) was an Indian art critic, author, and painter from Goa. He was widely recognized for his extensive writings on music and the arts, and he is credited with developing music criticism into a distinct literary genre.

== Early life and education ==
Bhobe was born on 6 August 1920 in Nerul, located in the Bardez region of Goa. Because his native village lacked adequate educational infrastructure, he initially acquired basic reading and writing literacy in the Marathi language at home. He later enrolled in a government school, where he completed his primary education up to the Portuguese Segundo Grau (Second Grade). Additionally, he completed two years of Lyceum education through private study. From his childhood, Bhobe displayed a natural inclination toward various artistic fields, including music, theatre, painting, and sculpture.

== Career ==
In 1943, Bhobe left Goa and relocated to Mumbai. There, he became acquainted with M. G. Rangnekar and began working with his theatrical organization, Natyaniketan. This position allowed him to closely interact with and build connections among a wide circle of prominent contemporary artists.

Aided by a sharp memory and a strong desire to learn, Bhobe mentally documented the nuances of the various musical concerts (mafils) he attended. By 1950, he had earned a reputation as an expert connoisseur of music. Alongside his interest in music, he pursued painting professionally. He eventually became the head of the art and illustration department for the Hindi, Marathi, and Gujarati editions of Gopal Nevatia's Reader's Digest.

Between 1962 and 1963, Bhobe began writing regular reviews of Mumbai's musical concerts for the daily newspaper Maharashtra Times. Through this work, he helped elevate music criticism to the status of a recognized literary form. He also regularly contributed articles and essays to periodicals such as Veena, Vasudha, and Deepavali.

Throughout his career, Bhobe associated with several legendary musicians and vocalists, including Kesarbai Kerkar, Mogubai Kurdikar, Khaprumam Parvatkar, Bade Ghulam Ali Khan, Amir Khan, the Dagar brothers (Nasir Moinuddin Dagar and Nasir Aminuddin Dagar), Ravi Shankar, Vilayat Khan, V. G. Jog, Kumar Gandharva, and Kishori Amonkar. These associations significantly expanded his understanding of music and solidified his standing as a leading critic.

== Literary works ==
Bhobe's literary contributions were diverse and elegant, extending beyond music to cover various subjects. His writings frequently reflected a deep affection for his native land of Goa.

In 1961, he published his first book, Chaturang Rekha, which profiles several prominent artists. This debut work received an award from the Gomantak Marathi Sahitya Sammelan. Following this, Bhobe authored eleven more books.

The books published during his lifetime include Aalap, Naad, Mase Ani Mi, Bharatache Bhagya Vidhate, Shapit Gandharva, Saat Swarashree, Asa Aahe Maza Gomantak, Pakshi Jeevan (a translation), Dhanya Te Gayani Kala (a play). Two of his works were published posthumously: Kalatmak Gomantak and Sangeet Tansen.

== Death ==
Bhobe died on 13 February 1968 in Margao, Goa, at the age of 47.
