= Asit Kumar Banerjee =

- Occupations: musician; teacher
- Spouse: Arati Banerjee
- Musical career
- Genres: indian classical; hindustani
- Instruments: Rudra Veena; Sitar
- Website: http://panditasitkumarbanerjee.com

Asit Kumar Banerjee is one of the few remaining rudra veena players in India. He is the disciple of Zia Mohiuddin Dagar, and can play both Sitar and rudra veena. He was the head of the Department of Instrumental Music in The Anand Foundation, Punjab, and has performed many rudra veena concerts both in India and abroad.

== Career ==
Asit Kumar Banerjee started learning Tabla at the age of six. His earliest master was V.C. Ambedkar of Benares gharana, and continued his lessons with Amir Hussain Khan of Mumbai. Later he became the student of Zia Mohiuddin Dagar and learnt Sitar, Surbahar and rudra veena. He received training also from Fariuddin Dagar, of Dagar Gharana. Asit Banerjee prefers dhrupad style of playing.

He is a member of East Zone Cultural Centre (E.Z.C.C.) and Indian Council for Cultural Relations (I.C.C.R.), an organization under the Ministry of External Affairs (India). Through his tours in India and abroad, he has tried to popularize the rudra veena by lecture-demonstrations and recordings for Television and Radio.

He was the music director for two documentary films about Sikh Regiments and about Ganges. He has worked as the head of the department of instrumental music in The Anand Foundation, Punjab. He also carry the title of Pramukh Acharya of Tansen Sangeet Vidyapith, Gwalior. Between 1986 and 1989 he has performed rudra veena in Doordarshan, together with his students.

Between 19 December 2003 and 30 December 2003, Asit Kumar Banerjee performed rudra veena in Belgium, France, Suriname and Trinidad and Tobago, under the sponsorship of I.C.C.R.

== Personal life ==
He is married to Arati Banerjee, and she is also a rudra veena player. She has performed together with Asit Kumar Banerjee in many concerts.
