= Ritwik Sanyal =

Indian classical singer (born 1953)

- Born: 12 April 1953 (age 72)
- Origin: Varanasi, India
- Genres: Hindustani classical music, Dhrupad
- Occupation: Classical Vocalist
- Years active: 1975–present
- Labels: Bihanmusic, Makar Records
- Website: www.ritwiksanyal.com

Pandit Ritwik Sanyal (born 12 April 1953) is an Indian classical singer and the Dhrupad maestro from Varanasi. He is a retired professor and former dean from the department of vocal music at the faculty of performing arts at Banaras Hindu University. On 5 April 2023, Pandit (Dr.) Ritwik Sanyal was conferred the Padma Shri award for 2023 in recognition of his outstanding contributions to the revival and propagation of the Dhrupad tradition, both as an academician and performer. A recipient of the esteemed Kendriya Sangeet Natak Akademi award in 2013, presented by the then Hon. President of India, Pranab Mukherjee, Pandit Ritwik Sanyal has now received the 4th highest civilian award, the Padma Shri, from President of India, Droupadi Murmu.

== Early life ==
Pandit Ritwik Sanyal was born in Katihar. He was trained in the dhrupad style of vocal music of the Dagar Tradition, believed to be descendant of Swami Haridas, who lived in the fifteenth century and trained the legendary Tansen. Sanyal also composes dhrupad lyrics.

Between 1963 and 1975, he received his training in Dhrupad under Zia Mohiuddin Dagar and Zia Fariddudin Dagar in Mumbai, India. He received an M. A. in philosophy from Mumbai University and a master's in music from Banaras Hindu University, securing the gold medal. He completed his Ph.D. in musicology from the same university, 1980 under the supervision of Prem Lata Sharma.

Pandit Ritwik Sanyal with next generation Dhrupad disciple and son Ribhu Sanyal

== Career ==
Sanyal is a retired professor and former dean from the Faculty of Performing Arts at Banaras Hindu University. He has around 50 published papers in various journals and also composes dhrupad lyrics. He is a "Top" grade (Dhrupad) artist at All India Radio & Doordarshan, Varanasi.

He has assimilated the Dagarvani tradition of Dhrupad and evolved a distinctive style of his own in the rendering of Dhrupad. He has specialized in advanced techniques of Alap - Jod - Jhala, laykari, voice culture and pedagogy both traditional and institutional.

He has performed both in India and abroad, including in the UK, US, Italy, Germany, Austria, Switzerland, Sweden, France, Holland, South Korea, Israel, Croatia, Brazil, Australia, Mauritius, and Japan. His performances in India include the National Programme of Music for AIR and Doordarshan, the Gwalior Tansen Samaroh, the Varanasi Dhrupad Mela, Harballabh Sangeet Samaroh Jallandhar, Saptak Ahmedabad, all the Dhrupad Festivals of the country and many other prestigious concert platforms of India.

== Discography ==
- Hari Singari, Bihaan Music
- Dhrupad Choir, Bihaan Music
- Sound of Life Pt. Ritwik Sanyal, Bihaan Music
- Pt. Ritwik Sanyal:Makar Records, France
- Hori: Pt. Ritwik Sanyal, Makar Records, France
- Pt. Ritwik Sanyal & Gianni Ricchizzi, Dhamar Raga Shree, Nomadism-Zahyrus Italy
- Pt. Ritwik Sanyal, Nada Records, South Korea (SEM Nada DE 0267)
- Pt. Ritwik Sanyal, Om & Raga Durbari, Dancing to the Flute, Australia

== Dhrupad lyricist and composer ==
Felicitation by Honorable Governor of Uttar Pradesh Shri Ram Naik for lifetime dedication and commitment to Indian Classical Music under the auspices of Sangit Milon Lucknow, 14 Dec 2014.

Some notable Dhrupad compositions are:

- Raga Purvi (Sooltal) Antara Dhyan Sura Anuranana Ranana on YouTube
- Raga Abhogi (Dhamar) Kaise Tum ho murakh Shyam on YouTube
- Raga Saraswati (Sooltaal) Ranjini Vina paani on YouTube
- Raga Kirwani (Sooltaal) Sur ko gaye dhyaye on YouTube

Pandit Ritwik Sanyal is also creator of many ragas which are very popular with the current generation of musicians. One of the raga that was created over 30 years ago by Panditji and Late Us. Zia Fariduddin Dagar is raga "Shruti vardhani"

(श्रुतिज्ञान) 'Shrutigyan' is the pen name 'छाप' of Pandit Ritwik Sanyal on many of his Dhrupad lyrics and compositions. Recently his composition on Raga Kirwani was very well appreciated in Vicenza, Italy. You can watch this performance on Youtube

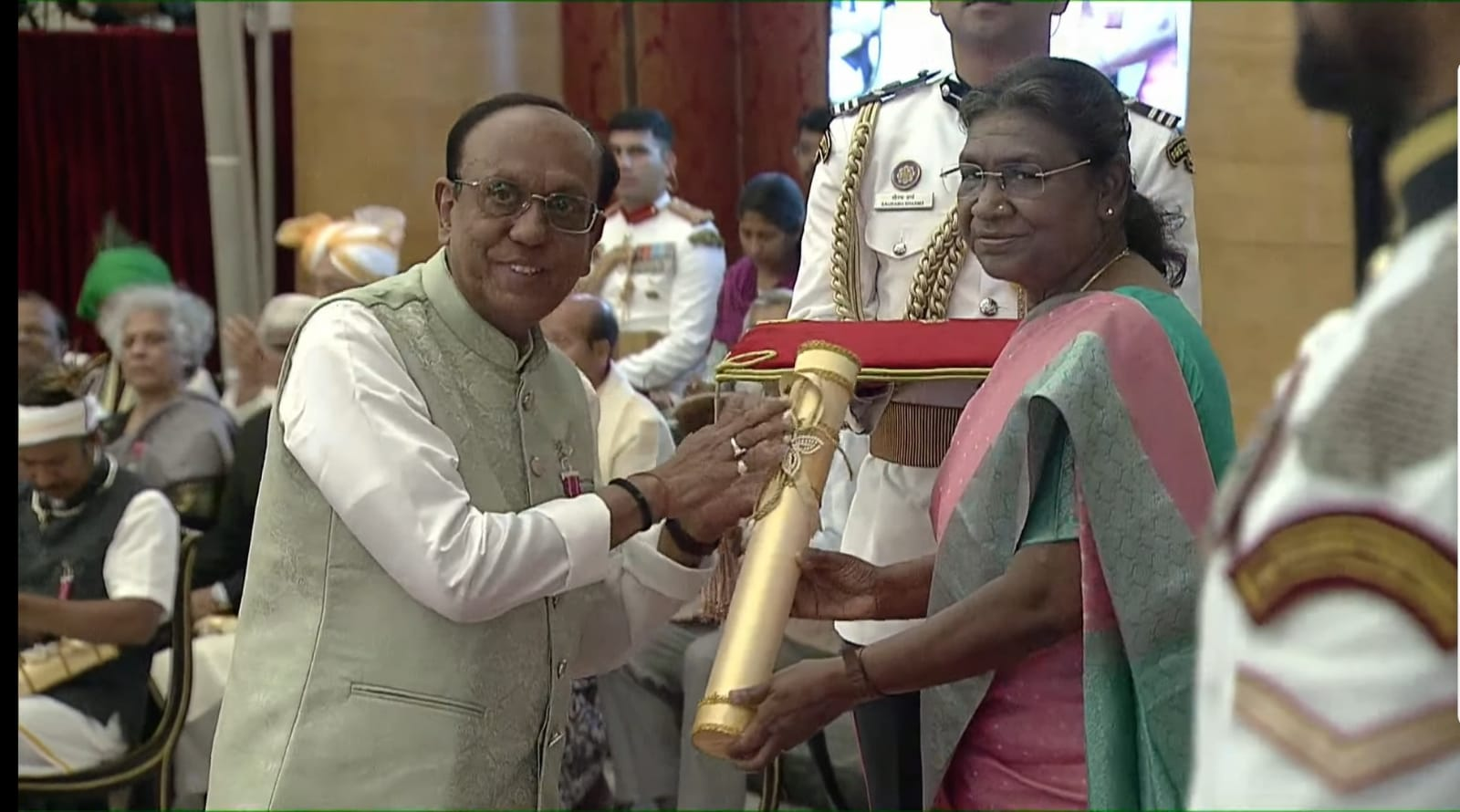
Ritwik Sanyal Receiving Padmashri Award 2023

== Awards and honour ==
- Pandit Ritwik Sanyal receiving the highest award for music in India, Sangeet Natak Akademi Award from President of India Hon. Shri Pranab Mukherji, April 2014
  Pt. Ritwik Sanyal has been awarded the prestigious Padma Shri in the field of art and music in Jan 2023 for his work on revival of Dhrupad.
- Sangeet Natak Akademi Award 2013
- Siti Vaijayanti Samman Siti Mahotsav Varanasi, 2004
- Uttar Pradesh Sangeet Natak Akademi Award 2002
- Honored by Kashiraj Trust, Varanasi, and Maharaja Travancore Svati Tirunal Award at the Dhrupad festival of Banaras for outstanding contribution to Dhrupad, 1995
- Honored by Indian Social & Cultural Lover's Organisation (ISCLO)-Varanasi/Calcutta 1990

== Bibliography ==
- Dhrupad Panchashika -Indica Publications -Varanasi April 2015.
- Philosophy of Music - Somaiya Publication -Mumbai 1987.
- Dhrupad Tradition and Performance in Indian Music -Ashgate, UK, 2004.
