= Gokulotsavji Maharaj =

Hindustani classical musician

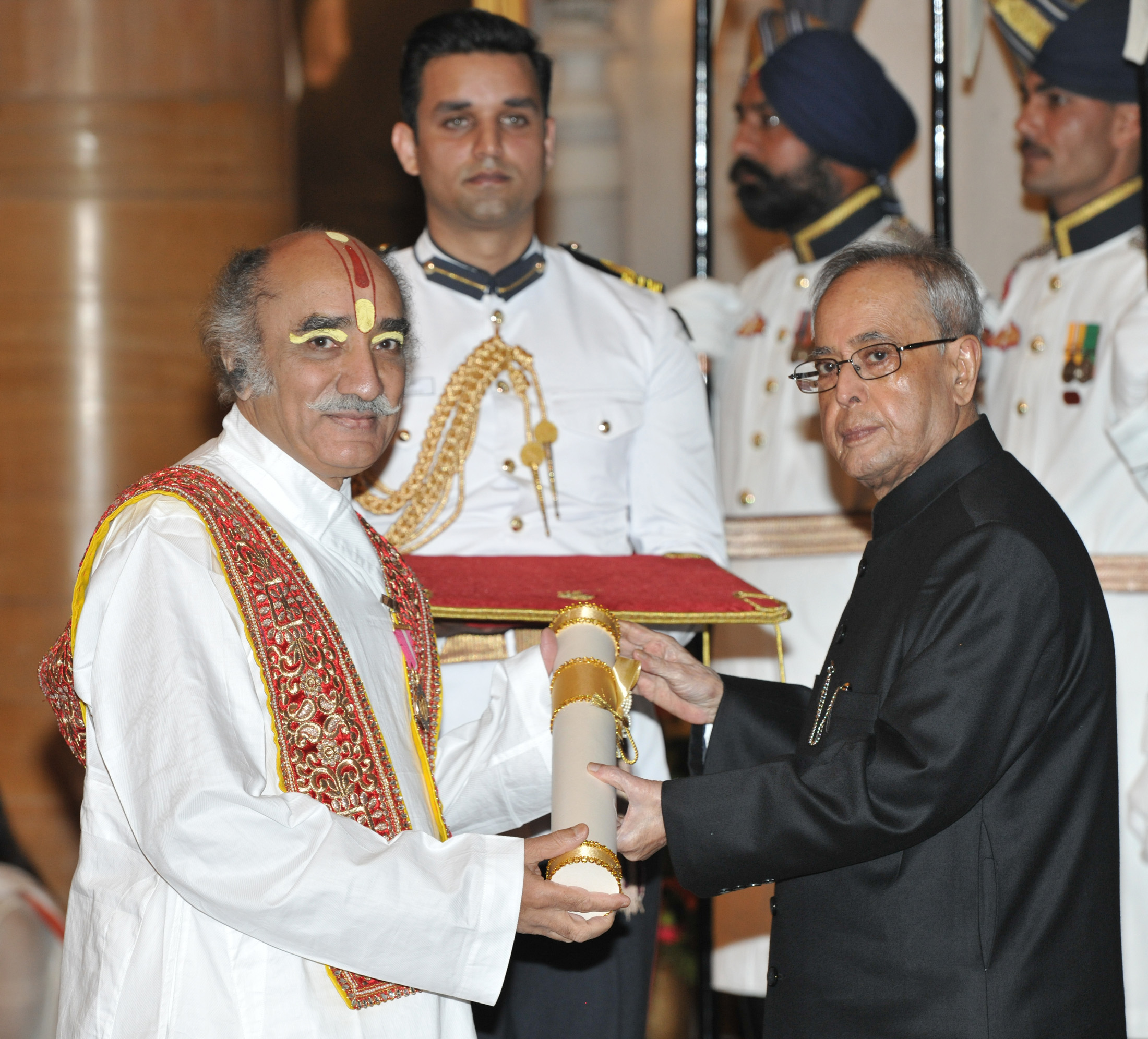
- Maharaj (left) receiving the Padma Bhushan award by then President of India, Pranab Mukherjee, on April 8, 2015.
- Born: India
- Occupations: Classical musician, composer, writer, vocalist and musicologist
- Known for: Hindustani music, Haveli Sangeet, Indian classical music and world philosophy
- Website: goswamigokulutsavji.com; gokulotsavji.com

Pandit Gokulotsavji Maharaj is a Hindustani classical musician, specializing in Khayal, Dhrupad Dhammar, Prabandh Gayaki and various other ancient Indian musical styles. He is also a singer-cum-composer, writer, poet and musicologist.

He composes music under the pen name MadhurPiya. He has created more than 5,000 compositions in Khayal, Dhrupad Dhammar, Prabandha Gayan, etc. in Sanskrit, Hindi, Braj Bhasha, Persian, Urdu. He belongs to the Samaveda (mother of Indian Music) and Krishna Yajurveda parampara (tradition).

He has received the Padma Bhushan and the Padma Shri by the Central Government of India. He has also received National Tansen Samman Award 7 December 2007, Dhrupad Ratna from Darbhanga Gharana of Dhrupad Virtuosos Pt. Kshtipal Mallick Dhrupad Society. He is the top grade artist of All India Radio (Aakashwani) and Doordarshan.

He has also created several new Raagas such as Bhaat Kalyan, AdhbhutRanjini, Hem Gaud, Madhur Malahar, Divya Gandhar, Khat Shringar, Prasanna Padaa, etc.

He sings in ancient talas, like Brahma Taal (28 beats per cycle) and Matta Taal (18 beats per cycle), Shikhar Taal, Lakshmi tala and others.

He has given interpretations and hidden meanings of syllables nom, tom, dere, na, tadani, etc., of dhrupad aalap and tarana, which were earlier considered to be meaningless and he states that these syllables derive their meaning, authority, creation and existence from vedic mantra beej-akshars.

Maharaj has created and founded his own distinct music style "Sarvang Sampurn Gayaki" consisting of a combination of various elements of classical vocal music as mentioned in sangeet shashtras.

Neeta Mathur (associate professor at Vivekanand College Delhi University) has authored a biographical book named "Shashtriya Sangeet ke Surya Acharya Pandit Gokulotsavji Maharaj (translation: "Sun of Classical Music Acharya Pandit Gokulotsavji Mahara" on Maharaj.

Maharaj has also served as the Member of Indian Council for Cultural Relations (ICCR), Trustee of Bharat Bhavan and Judge to the First Court of Harisingh Gour Vishwavidyalaya, Sagar.

== Recordings - Music Albums ==
Title	Raags	Publishers	Cassettes/CD
Ustadi Gayaki Vol.1	Gujri Todi & Darabari	Rhythm House	Audio Cassette
Ustadi Gayaki Vol.2	Jog and Bihag	Rhythm House	Audio Cassette
Ustadi Gayaki Vol.3	Bairagi & Yaman	Rhythm House	Audio Cassette
Ustadi Gayaki Vol.4	Hindol & Ahir Bhirav	Rhythm House	Audio Cassette
Swar Sudha	AdbhutRanjni, Malkons & Chandrakons		Audio Cassette
Khyal-O-Tarana	Gujri Todi, Marwa and Bairagi Lalit, Bhatiyar and Bageshree	Audiorec	Double CD
Music from India-Live	Ram Priya, Deshkar	Asian Music Circuit	CD
Haveli Sangeet	Various Ragas are covered	Times of India	Cassette
Pristine Purity Khayal & Tarana			CD
Bhina Shadaj	Indira Gandhi National Centre for the Arts(IGNCA)		CD
Bandishe	Various Ragas are covered		CD

== See also ==
- Hindustani Classical Music
- Music of India
- Haveli Sangeet
