= Gundecha Brothers =

Indian classical singers

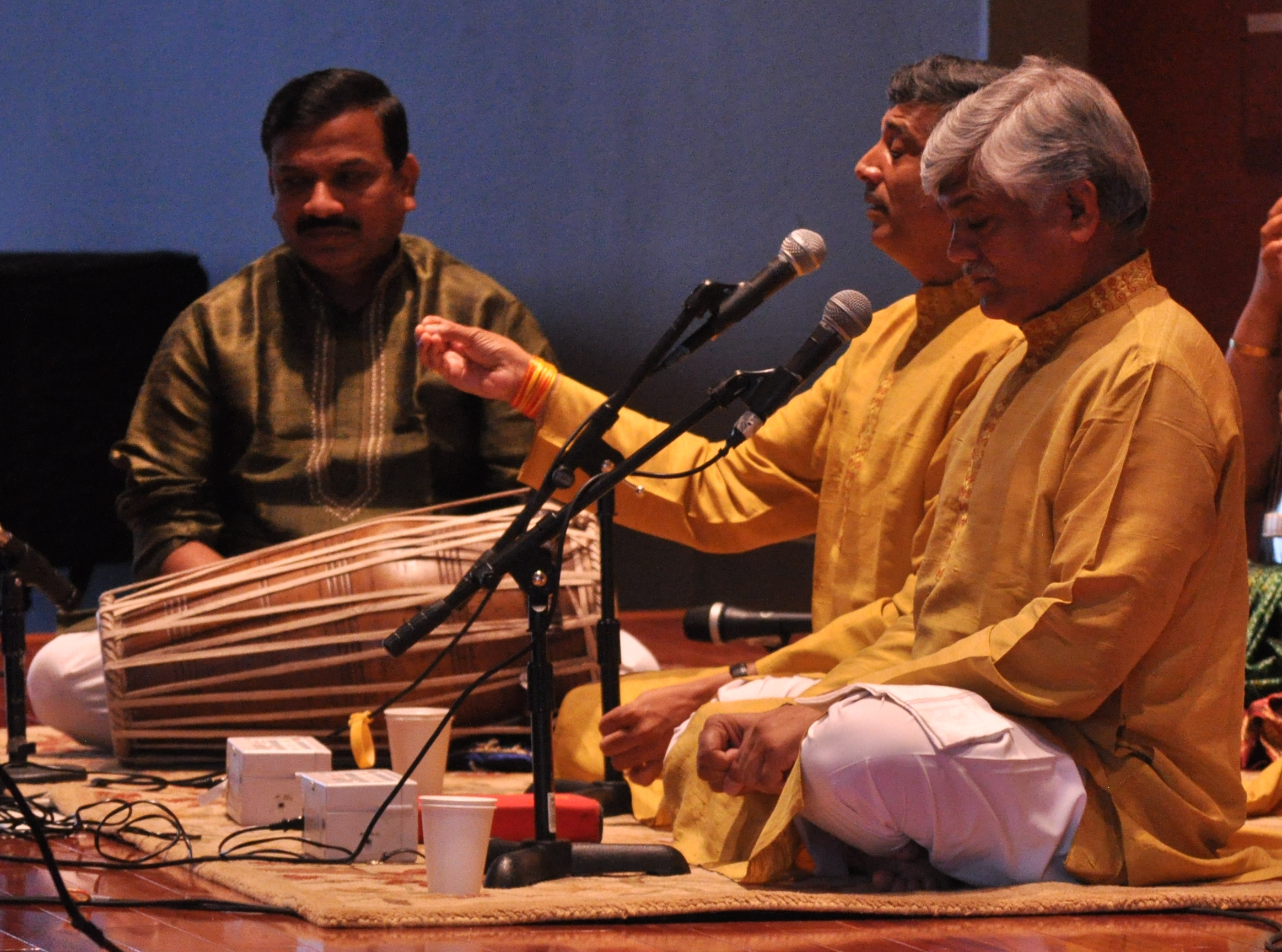
- Gundecha Brothers (2012). Left to right: youngest brother Akhilesh Gundecha (Pakhawaj), younger brother Ramakant Gundecha (Vocal), elder brother Umakant Gundecha (Vocal)

Background information
- Origin: Ujjain, India
- Genres: Hindustani classical music, Dagar vani
- Occupation: Classical Vocalist
- Years active: 1985 – present
- Labels: His Master's Voice, Music Today
- Website: Official site

The Gundecha Brothers are Indian classical singers of the dhrupad genre of the Dagar vani. From 1985 to 2019 the duo consisted of brothers Umakant Gundecha and Ramakant Gundecha and were awarded the Padma Shri for art for 2012. Following the death of Ramakant Gundecha in 2019, his son Anant began to perform with Umakant in the Gundecha bandhu.

== Early life and background ==
They studied at the local Madhav Music College. Umakant has a post-graduate degree in music and economics and the younger Ramakant in music and commerce.

They moved to Bhopal in 1981 for training in Dhrupad music under Zia Fariduddin Dagar and his brother Zia Mohiuddin Dagar. Both gurus were second cousins of the two major Dhrupad forces in the second half of the 20th century; two duos known as the senior Dagar Brothers (Nasir Moinuddin & Nasir Aminuddin) and the junior Dagar Brothers (Nasir Zahiruddin & Nasir Faiyazuddin) respectively.

Ramakant Gundecha died in Bhopal on 8 November 2019 from a heart attack at the age of 57. He was married and had a son. He was cremated on 9 November 2019 in Bhopal.

== Career ==
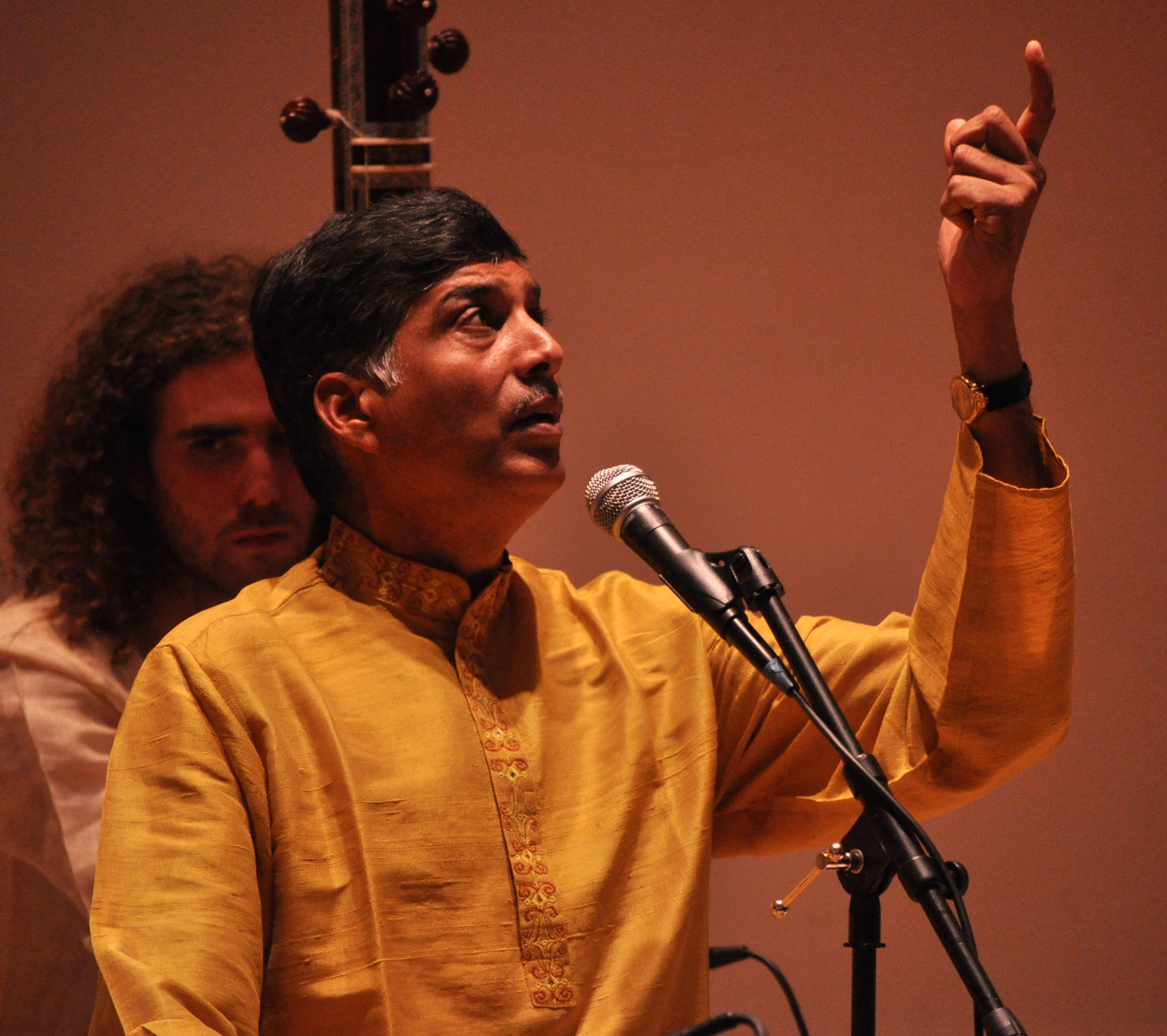
Ramakant Gundecha (2012)

After training for four years, they performed in public for the first time in May 1985, at the Uttaradhikar dance and music festival in Bhopal. They have worked to expand the dhrupad repertoire by incorporating texts by Hindi poets such as Tulsidas, Padmakar and Nirala.

The Gundecha Brothers also sing the Dhrupad compositions of India's senior Kathak exponent Mahamahopadhyay Dr. Pandit Puru Dadheech, in particular, his famous Shankar Pralayankar composition.

They have set up a Dhrupad institute outside Bhopal where they teach students from all over the world. They run a music school in the Dhrupad tradition, according to the guru-shishya style of teaching that is prevalent in India for teaching of the arts.

=== Recordings and fellowships ===
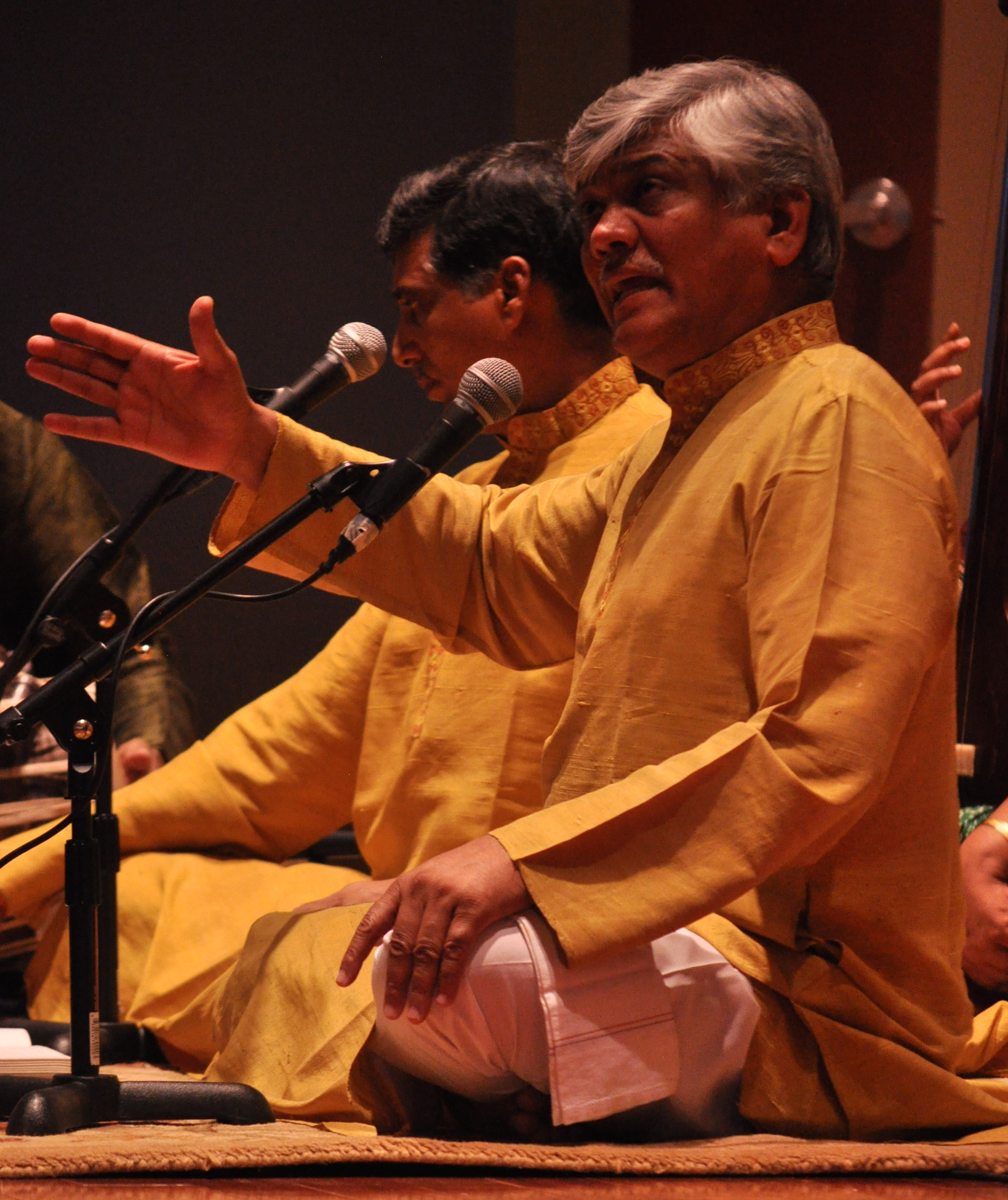
Umakant Gundecha (2012). Ramakant Gundecha in background.

They have recorded many cassettes and CDs by His Master's Voice, Music Today, Rhythm House, IPPNW Concerts Berlin, Navras and Audio Rec London. They have also sung for many television channels in India and have been broadcast on British, U.S., German and French Radio as well. As well as being an integral part of all of India's prestigious music festivals, the brothers have also performed at many important international music festivals and institutions in Europe, U.S.A., Australia, Singapore, Bangladesh, U.A.E. and Hong Kong.

They have received M.P. Govt. Scholarship from 1981 to 1985, National Fellowship from 1987 to '89, Ustad Allauddin Khan Fellowship in 1993, Sanskriti Award in 1994 and Kumar Gandharva Award in 1998 by Govt. of Madhaya Pradesh and Dagar Gharana Award by Mewar Foundation in 2001.

== Awards ==
- National Fellowship 1987–89
- Ustad Allauddin Khan Fellowship 1993
- Sanskriti Award 1994
- Kumar Gandharva Award by Government of Madhya Pradesh 1998
- Dagar Gharana Award by Mewar Foundation 2001
- Rajat Kamal—National Film Award for Best Music Direction 2006
- Puttaraj Gawai Award from Puttaraj Gawai Pratishthan, Dharwad 2010
- Padma Shri by Government of India 2012
- Spandan Sammaan 2016
- Shrimati Vatsala Joshi Samman 2016
- Lifetime Achievement Award by Union Bank 2017
- Madhya Pradesh Gaurav Samman 2017
- Sangeet Natak Akademi Award 2017
- Swati Tirunal Samman 2018

== Controversy ==
On 4 September 2020, a student of Dhrupad Sansthan (training school run by Gundecha brothers) accused the late Ramakant Gundecha and Akhilesh Gundecha of sexual abuse. Following this event, several more students came forward with their allegations of abuse in discussions with the media. The school announced Akhilesh Gundecha would be stepping down while the accusations were investigated by the internal committee.

As part of an internal probe conducted by the institution, an ICC was constituted to investigate the allegations. The ICC passed adverse recommendations against Akhilesh Gundecha. Among many other recommendations, it advised reconstitution of the institute's board of trustees to include a majority of non-family members, as well as penalties on the institute, disciplinary action and measures for reparation.

The Gundecha Brothers approached the Madhya Pradesh high court challenging the ICC report and recommendations.

In response,12 women filed an intervening application in support of the ICC.

== Discography ==
Rhythm House (MCs):

- Vol. 1, Raag- Bhimpalasi, Gurjari Todi, Malkauns
- Vol. 2, Raag- Bihag, Madhumad Sarang, Sohni

Music Today (MCs and CDs)

- Bhaktimala / Rama – Vol. 1
- Bhaktimala/ Shiva – Vol. 1
- Bhaktimala/ Hanumana – Vol. 2
- Bhaktimala/ Ganesh – Vol. 1
- Young Masters -Vol.1
- Raga – Shyam Kalyan and Jaijaiwanti

His Master's Voice (MCs and CDs) Naad Sugandh

- Vol. 1, Raga – Bhupali, Puriya Dhanashri, Shankara
- Vol. 2, Raga- Jounpuri, Megh, Komal Rishabh Asawari

Raga – Bihag, Night Melody- Raga IPPNW – CONCERTS, Germany −1995

- Raga- Darbari, Audio Rec – UK −1998
- Navras- UK (CD) – Raag- Yaman and Charukeshi
- Isha Music – Durga Kavach
- Raga- Komal Rishabh Asawari – Dhrupad Vocal, Sundaram Records- 2003
- DARSHAN

Raga – Komal Rishabh Asawari Sense world Music, UK – 2003

- Raga- Bhairava – Dhrupad Vocal, Sundaram Records- 2003
- Dhrupad- Live of 19th Tokyo Summer Festival
- Arion Edo Foundation and Intoxicate Records
- DVD – Raga- Miyan Malhar, Megh, Shivaranjani,
- Malkouns, Adana
- Manthan- Lecture Demonstration on Dhrupad
- SPIC MACAY COMMUNICATIONS-2005
- Raga- Miyan Malhar– Dhrupad Vocal
- Raga Bageshri
- Raga Bilaskhani Todi
- Sundaram Records- 2004
- Sacred Chants of Jainism: Bhaktamar Stotra – 2006
