= Uday Bhawalkar =

Indian classical vocalist

- Born: 5 February 1966 (age 60)
- Origin: Ujjain, MP India
- Genre: Dhrupad
- Occupation: Musician
- Years active: 1990 - present
- Website: Official website

Pandit Uday Bhawalkar is an Indian classical vocalist. He is an exponent of the dhrupad genre.

== Early years ==
Uday Bhawalkar was born on 5 February 1966 in Ujjain, Madhya Pradesh, the youngest of three siblings. He began training in classical music from his elder sister. At the age of 15, he received scholarship at the Dhrupad Kendra, Bhopal. Here and subsequently in Mumbai, Uday was trained in dhrupad in the Guru Shishya Parampara, under the tutelage of Zia Fariduddin Dagar, and later under his guru's elder brother, Zia Mohiuddin Dagar.

== Career ==
In 1987, Nasir Aminuddin Dagar (one of the senior Dagar Brothers) awarded Uday a gold medal. Since then he has performed widely in India and abroad, in concerts, workshops and lecture-demonstration sessions. Based in Pune, he regularly performs on National TV and radio in India. Additionally, he has contributed to the soundtracks of films such as Mani Kaul's Cloud Door, Aparna Sen's Mr & Mrs Iyer, Amol Palekar's Anahat, Arun Khopkar's Lokpriya and Rasikpriya, Renuka Shane's Rita and Gajendra Ahire's Ma Baap.

=== Teaching ===
Uday began teaching at the age of 20. He now lives and teaches students at his house in Pune. He was also a Visiting Artist in Residence at the University of Washington in Seattle in the Department of Ethnomusicology, a position held many years ago by his Guru, Zia Mohiuddin Dagar. He gives workshops in London every year at the Asian Music Circuit. He is also one of the gurus at the ITC Sangeet Research Academy, Kolkata. In 2014 he joined another music school, Bengal Parampara Sangeetalayon in Dhaka, as a guru.

== The Veena Foundation ==
In 1992, he was instrumental in the creation of the Veena Foundation, a trust founded in memory of the late Ustad Zia Mohiuddin Dagar. This organization was conceived to promote Dhrupad music by organizing concerts, giving scholarships to students who may be economically challenged, and various other activities.

== Performances ==
Pandit Uday Bhawalkar has performed all over the world at prestigious venues. Most recently, he performed at the Aga Khan Museum in Toronto, Canada in 2018 for the Raag-Mala Music Society of Toronto.

== Awards ==
- Ustad Allauddin Khan Academy, Bhopal Scholarship (1981–1985)
- National Scholarship (1986–1989)
- Gold medal from Ustad Nasir Aminuddin Dagar (1987)
- Junior Fellowship (1993–1995)
- Rashtreeya Kumar Gandharva Samman (2001)
- Vishva Sangeet Ratna From Della Heritage Foundation (2005)
- Raza Foundation Award 2006–2007, New Delhi (2008)
- Sangeet Natak Akademi Award (2021)
- Hanumant Award (2023)
