= Aliya Rasheed =

Pakistani singer

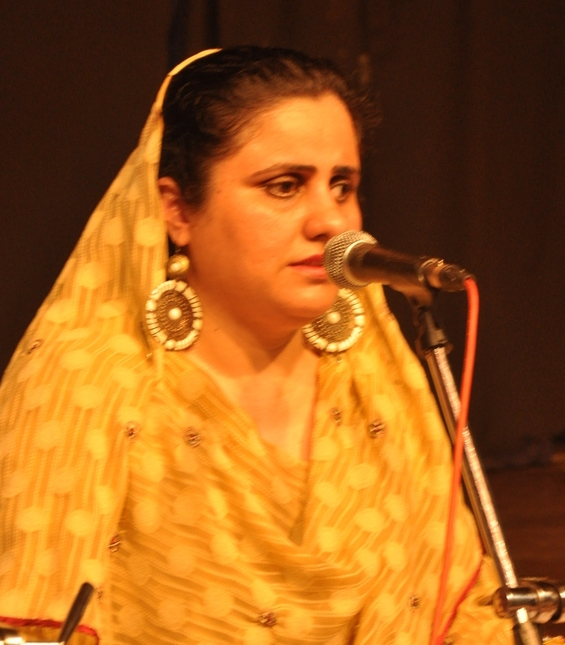
Aliya, singing in Trivandrum, Kerala, India Jan 2013

Aliya Rasheed (Urdu: عاليہ رشيد) is a female Pakistani Dhrupad singer. She has trained under the Gundecha Brothers.

Aliya Rasheed and Amita sinhas Drupad concert at Trivandrum, Kerala

== Background ==
Aliya is a teacher in the musicology department of the National College of Arts in Lahore, Punjab. She also teaches music at the Sanjan Nagar School.

== See also ==
- Dhrupad
