= Gesupur =

- village
- Nickname: gesupur
- Location in Uttar Pradesh, India Gesupur (India)
- Coordinates: 28°33′N 77°42′E
- Country: India
- State: Uttar Pradesh
- District: Bulandshahr

Government
  - Body: Gram panchayat
  - Master: मास्टर भिक्कन सिंह
- Elevation: 178 m (584 ft)

Language
  - Official: Hindi
  - Additional official: Urdu
  - Regional: Khariboli
- Time zone: UTC+5:30 (IST)
- PIN: 203205
- Telephone code: 05735
- Vehicle registration: UP 13

Gesupur is a village and panchayat in Bulandshahr district, Meerut division, Uttar Pradesh, India, on the Kali River. It was named in honour of Mir Gesu, a 16th-century Faujdar of Meerut and Delhi. He belongs to Chattha Jat clan.

In 1999 the village united in a boycott of the Lok Sabha elections, when none of the 7,200 registered electors voted in protest against the lack of investment in the local infrastructure. The boycott was a success, leading to improvements being made in roads and the supply of electricity and water.

Gespur is populated by both Hindus and Muslims, and its main industries are sugarcane, rice and wheat farming. There is 150+ feet tall old Shiv Mandir in Gesupur, which is famous in nearby areas. Most village inhabitants are Dagar, Sheoran and Teotia Jats. The village is almost 25 km from Greater Noida and is at boundary of two districts G.B Nagar and Bulandashahr. The village is connected to Sikandarabad via Gulaothi Road but lacks connectivity to Greater Noida.

There are 3 primary schools in the area, and one RSS owned Sarasvati Vidya Mandir school. Gesupur's market is well known within the region.
