= Who Am I? =

Who Am I? or Who Am I may refer to:

== Film ==
- Who Am I? (1921 film). a silent drama directed by Henry Kolker
- Who Am I? (1998 film), a Hong Kong film starring Jackie Chan
- Who Am I? (2009 film), a Cambodian film
- Who Am I (2014 film), or Who Am I – No System is Safe, a 2014 German film
- Who Am I 2015, a 2015 Chinese film, a remake of the 1998 film
- Who Am I (2023 film), an Indian Hindi-language film

== Music ==
=== Albums ===
- Who Am I (B1A4 album)
- Who Am I (Berwyn album)
- Who Am I (Drapht album)
- Who Am I? (Pale Waves album)

=== Songs ===
- "Who Am I?" (Casting Crowns song), 2003
- "Who Am I" (Katy B song), 2016
- "Who Am I?" (Adam Faith song), 1961
- "Who Am I?" (Petula Clark song), 1966
- "Who Am I" (Will Young song), 2005
- "Who Am I (Sim Simma)", by Beenie Man, 1997
- "Who Am I? (What's My Name?)", by Snoop Doggy Dogg, 1993
- "Who Am I", by Ace of Base from The Golden Ratio, 2010
- "Who Am I", by New Found Glory from Catalyst, 2004
- "Who Am I", by Parachute Express from Feel the Music, 1986
- "Who Am I", by Royce da 5'9" from Rock City, 2002
- "Who Am I?", by Bazzi from Soul Searching
- "Who Am I?", by Craig's Brother from Homecoming, 1998
- "Who Am I?", by Peace Orchestra from Peace Orchestra, 1999
- "Who Am I?", by Rusty Goodman, 1969
- "Who Am I", by Leonard Bernstein from the musical Peter Pan, 1950
- "Who Am I?" soundtrack by Jule Styne and Walter Bullock from the film Hit Parade of 1941, 1940
- "Who Am I?", song from the musical Les Misérables
- "Who Am I?", song featured in the SpongeBob SquarePants episode "Mimic Madness", 2017
- "Who Am I?", song performed by Cameron Diaz, Jamie Foxx and, Quvenzhané Wallis, from the musical Annie, 2014
- "Who Am I", by Status Quo from Rockin' All Over the World, 1977

== Other ==
- "Who Am I", teachings of Sri Ramana Maharshi on self-enquiry
- Who Am I?, a 1966 religious education book by Katherine Paterson
- A question about personal identity
- #who am I, 2023 Japanese midnight television show starring Shogo Hama

== See also ==
- "Who Am I This Time?", a short story by Kurt Vonnegut
- Who Am I This Time? (film), a film adaptation of Vonnegut's story
- whoami, a shell command
- "Whoami" (Mr. Robot), an episode of the television series Mr. Robot
- "Raise Up", a 2001 song by Petey Pablo
