= Pushparaj Koshti =

Pandit Pushparaj Koshti is an eminent exponent of the surbahar and sitar and one of the senior lineage holders in the Dagar dhrupad tradition. He was born on 3 November 1951 in a musician's family.

Shri Pushpraj Koshti received his initial training in the Surbahar from his father late Shri. Ramlal Koshti. After the untimely death of his father, he honed his art under Ustad Zia Mohiuddin Dagar, the eminent musician of the dagar tradition for more than 15 years. Later, he studied dhrupad-singing under Ustad Zia Fariduddin Dagar. His rendering of alap and jor is serene, unique, and uncompromising as regards the tradition, purity, and gravity of style for which the Dagar Vani is renowned for.
