= Siyaram Tiwari (musician) =

Indian classical singer (1919–1998)

Pandit Siyaram Tiwari
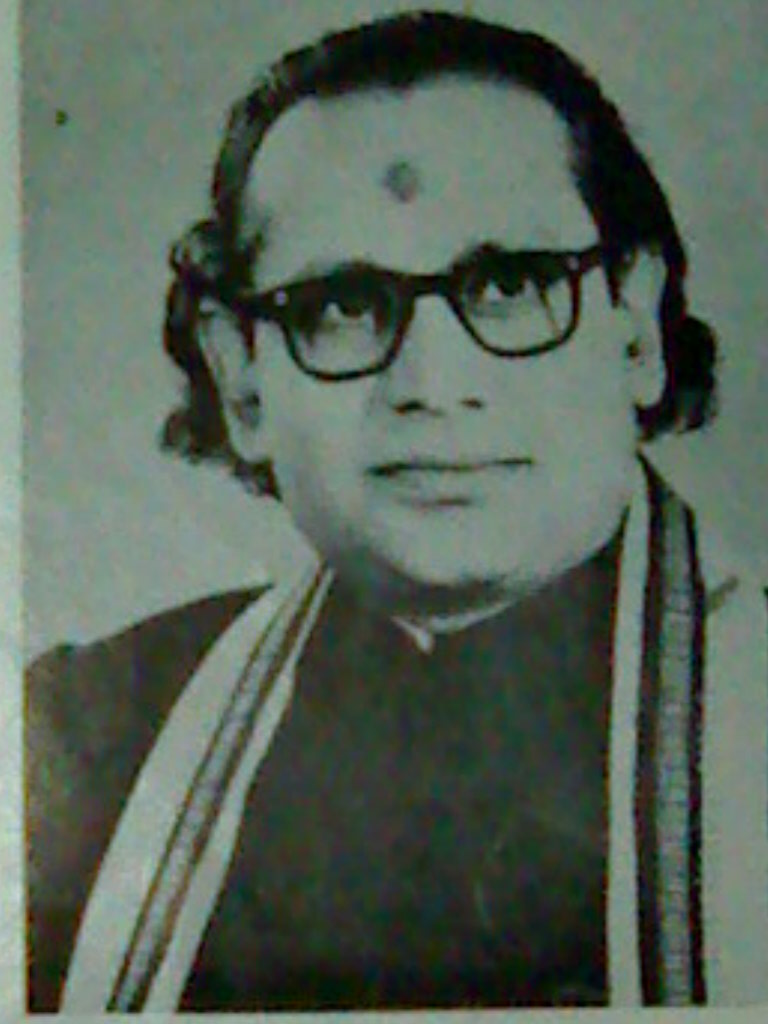

Background information
- Born: March 10, 1919
- Origin: India
- Died: 10 March 1998 (aged 78–79)
- Genres: Classical
- Occupation: Musician

Siyaram Tiwari (10 March 1919 – 1998) was an Indian classical singer and leading exponent of Dhrupad-genre of Hindustani classical music. He belonged to the Darbhanga gharana and was based in Patna. Though Darbhanga gharana is known for its laykari (the play on laya or tempo, using devices such as syncopation) techniques, he was the first exponent of the gharana to promote fast-paced laykari in Dhrupad, which developed in the second half of 20th-century.

In 1971, he was awarded the Padma Shri by Government of India. Thereafter in 1984, he was awarded the Sangeet Natak Akademi Fellowship the highest honour conferred by the Sangeet Natak Akademi, India's National Academy of Music, Dance & Drama.

== Early life and background ==
Born in 1919 in Darbhanga, Bihar, he received his training in Dhrupad from his maternal grandfather, of Dharbhanga gharana. Subsequently, his learnt Khyal, Thumri and Bhajan genre from his father Baldev Tiwari.

== Career ==
His singing, gayaki was known for Swara, Meend, Gamak and Laykari. Besides improvisation of complicated Chhand, which allowed him to move from one rhythm pattern to another. He also performed in other genres such as Khyal, Thumri, Tappa and bhajan.

He was a leading performer at All India Radio, Patna.

Awards: Padma Shri in 1971, gold medal. From Pres. Dr.Rajendra Prasad 1955, Bihar ratna 1989, tansen award and many other awards by numerous music organisations of India and abroad. performed in concerts all over India, Europe, etc.

Tiwari died in 1998.

== Family ==
He is the Maternal Grandfather of Indian Television actress Neha Sargam. She is a talented singer herself and has been lauded for her acting and singing in popular musical play Mughal é Azam.

The grandson of Pandit Siyaram Tiwari, Dr. Sumeet Anand Pandey is known as a young maestro and one of the most promising artists in this genre. Having learnt during his childhood from his grandfathers, Shri Birendra Mohan Panday and Pandit Siyaram Tiwari, he got an opportunity to be thoroughly trained by Pandit Abhay Narayan Mallick who happened to be the grandnephew of Pandit Ram Chatur Mallick of Darbhanga Mallick Family. Sumeet Anand Pandey is a government accredited artist being graded by AIR, empaneled by ICCR and enlisted by SPICMACAY. He is a holder of numerous awards and scholarships, including those from the Ministry of Culture, Government of India. His areas of performance include India and Europe. Pandit Siyaram Tiwari Memorial Sangeet Trust is a non-profit trust founded by Sumeet Anand Pandey in 2014 which aims at preserving, promoting and popularising Indian Classical Music.
