= Rahim Fahimuddin Dagar =

Indian singer (1927–2011)

Rahim Fahimuddin Dagar (2 February 1927 – 27 July 2011) was an exponent of Dagar vani Dhrupad of Indian classical music. He represented the 19th generation of Dagar Tradition. His cousins Nasir Moinuddin Dagar and Nasir Aminuddin Dagar were known as the Senior Dagar Brothers. Similarly, Nasir Zahiruddin and Nasir Faiyazuddin Dagar were known as the Junior Dagar Brothers. His other cousins were Zia Mohiuddin Dagar, Fariduddin Dagar, and H. Sayeeduddin Dagar.

He was awarded the Padma Bhushan in 2008, the third highest civilian honour given by Government of India, followed by the 2010 Sangeet Natak Akademi Fellowship, the highest honour in the performing arts conferred by the Sangeet Natak Akademi, India's National Academy for Music, Dance and Drama.

== Biography ==
Born in Alwar, Rajasthan in 1927 into the illustrious Dagar family, Ustad Rahim Fahimuddin Khan Dagar is the son of Padma Bhushan Ustad Allabande Rahimuddin Khan Dagar who died in 1975. Initiated into the art of dhrupad at the age of five by his uncle Ustad Nasiruddin Khan Dagar, he received musical education for a period of 35 years from his father and family elders. In his words, "this included full mastery over the 52 alankaars (fundamental principles), Nāda yoga, Rudra veena, Sanskrit education and of course Dhrupad-Dhamar." He studied Rudra Veena from his uncle Ustad Ziauddin Khan Dagar for twelve years. He also took occasional lessons from his other uncles Ustad Hussainuddin Khan Dagar( better known as Tansen Pandey) and Ustad Imamuddin Khan Dagar. He learnt Sanskrit from his father and Pandit Giridharilal Shastri.

Ustad Rahim Fahimuddin Khan Dagar was known not only for the power and spontaneity of his alaap, but also for his rich repertoire of compositions, some of which are believed to date back to the 12th and 13th centuries.

It is the quality of music which has taken him to many countries like the United States, France, Germany and Italy for performances before select audiences. His recordings have been released in Switzerland, Germany and Italy.

== Awards ==
Ustad Rahim Fahimuddin Khan Dagar has been honoured with various awards, including:

- Sangeet Ratan (1956)
- Sangeet Natak Akademi Award (1993–94),
- Dhrupad Ratan (1993–94)
- Sahitya Kala Parishad (1996)
- Indra Gandhi Fellowship (1997)
- Ustad Hafiz Ali Khan Award (1997)
- Mewar Foundation Award (2002)
- Maharaja Sawai Ishwari Singh Award (2002)
- Kalidas Samman (2002)
- Bihar Dhrupad Ratan (2002)
- Rajasthan Sangeet Natak Akademi Award (2003)
- Sangeet Bhusan (2003)
- Shama Indian Cultural Society Award (2004)
- Lifetime Achievement Award (2005) by North American Dhrupad Association
- Lifetime Achievement Award, by Govt. of Delhi (2007)
- Padma Bhushan Award (2008),
- Sangeet Natak Akademi Fellowship (Ratna Purashkar) (2010).
- Ustad Mushtaq Ali Khan Lifetime Achievement Award (2011)
