= Dagara =

Dagara may refer to the following:

- Dagara people, an African ethnic group
  - Dagara language, their language
- Dagara, Baleswar, a village in India
- A district, or barangay, in Kabugao, Apayao, the Philippines
