= Rahim-ud-in Khan Dagar =

Indian dhrupad singer

Ustad Rahimuddin Khan Dagar (1900–1975) was a dhrupad singer from India who was awarded Padma Bhushan in 1969 . He was the father of Rahim Fahimuddin Dagar and uncle of H. Sayeeduddin Dagar, who were trained under him.
