= Ram Chatur Mallick =

Indian classical musician (1902–1990)

- Born: 5 October 1902; Amta, Darbhanga, Bihar, India
- Died: 11 January 1990 (aged 87); Patna Medical College and Hospital, Patna, Bihar, India
- Resting place: Amta, Darbhanga, Bihar, India
- Occupations: Landlord & Indian Classical musician
- Known for: Hindustani music, Dhrupad
- Children: Late Ramji Mallick
- Parent: Late Rajit Ram Singh Mallick
- Awards: Padma Shri, Tansen Award, Surmani, Doctor of Letters, Sangeet Natak Academy Award, Indira Gandhi Sangeet Peeth Award

Pandit Ram Chatur Mallick (1902–1990) was an Indian classical musician and an exponent and founder to the outside world of the Darbhanga gharana of the Dhrupad tradition, one of the oldest genres of Hindustani vocal music. Known to be the last main court musician at the court of The Darbhanga Royals, following his immediate & direct ancestors from the last 14 generations and one of the closest to the King of the Dharbanga Maharaja Sir Kameshwar Singh, he also was the closest ADC to his highness and responsible for all music related activities on behalf of the King and King's brother, he was a member of the Mallick family of singers. He was honoured by the Government of India in 1970 with Padma Shri, the fourth highest Indian civilian award.

== Biography ==
Pandit Ramchatur Mallick was born at Amta village, a small hamlet in Darbhanga district in the northern part of the Indian state of Bihar in 1902. His was a family of musicians in the Karta Ram lineage, known as the Mallick family of Dhrupad musicians who were court musicians at the Darbhanga court. His father, Rajit Ram, was a known singer and a great poet-writer based upon ancient Vedic scripts who created thousands of hymns to be sung as Dhrupad and was credited with the creation of Raga Vinod, Rajit Ram's hand written vedic hymes all consolidated in the book named "Bhakt Vinod" is still kept by his current descendants. He inherited the skills from the legacy traditional routine of his family and from his father and later trained under Kshitipal Mallick, a renowned musician of those days. and later under Rameshwar Pathak who is known to be the greatest ever Sitar practitioner. After becoming a court musician at the Darbhanga court of Maharaja Kameshwar Singh, he traveled around the world as a performer and as a companion of Raja Bahadur Bishweshwar Singh, the king's younger brother. During his voyages around the world and old India before partition of 1947 he was also hugely acknowledged by many princely states of India like Patiala, Jaipur, Kashmir etc... and hugely appreciated by many of the contemporary music practitioners of his time like Ustad Salamat Ali Khan, Ustad Bade Ghulam Ali Khan, Ustad Amir Khan etc... He served the court till 1947 when India became independent.

Mallick Ji was known to be adept at Khyal and Thumri, along with his chosen genre of Dhrupad and was associated with the leading singers of his time such as Ustad Amir Khan and Ustad Bade Ghulam Ali Khan. He followed the Darbhanga gharana of Dhrupad and his virtuosity in the Dhrupad was reported to have earned him the moniker, Dhrupad Samrat. The Government of India honoured him with the civilian award of Padma Shri in 1970. He was active till his death on 11 January 1990. His concerts have been brought out in CD format under the name, Masters Of Raga: The King of Dhrupad - Ram Chatur Mallick In Concert, by Weltm.

Mallick Ji also was the only artist ever to be gifted "The Top Grade" from All India Radio without audition, All India Radio awards grades to artists of different cadres based upon multiple level of auditions but Mallick Ji received this as a gift from All India Radio. He remained one of the chief selectors for All India Radio, Delhi for the Top Grade panel until he lived.

Mallick Ji also was awarded the "Tansen Award" the first when this award was started by the Madhya Pradesh Government.

The highest award given in the field of Music by the Bihar government is named after him "Pandit Ram Chatur Mallick Sangeet Award".

Mallick Ji is survived by his daughter in law Ms. Kusum Devi (who is the wife of his only child & son Late Ramji Mallick) along with his 2 grandsons (Arun Kumar Mallick & Vijay Kumar Mallick) & 2 grand daughters (Kamini & Rita).

== See also ==
- Dhrupad
- Hindustani music
