= Dhamar (music) =

One of the talas used in Hindustani classical music from the Indian subcontinent

Dhamar is one of the talas used in Hindustani classical music from the Indian subcontinent. It is associated with the dhrupad style and typically played on the pakhawaj and also tabla.

Dhamar taal has 14 beats (matras) grouped asymmetrically into a 5-2-3-4 pattern.

A song in dhrupad style set to dhamar tala is also called a dhamar. The text of a dhamar concerns the antics of Krishna teasing the milkmaids during the Holi (hori) Spring Festival of colours. It is considered a relatively light, gentle, and romantic musical form.

The theka or syllabic pattern of dhamar tala is:

1    2    3    4    5    6    7    8    9    10   11   12   13  14
क    ध्धि   ट    धि   ट    धा    ऽ    ग    त्ति  ट    ति   ट    ता   ऽ
ka   ddhi Ta   dhi  Ta  dhaa  -    Ga   Ti   Ta   Ti   Ta   taa  -

In counting out the beat, beats 1, 6, and 11 are clapped (tali), and beat 8 is indicated by a wave of the hand (khali):

(1) Clap 2 3 4 5 |(1) Clap 2 |(1) Wave 2 3 |(1) Clap 2 3 4 ||
