= Junior Dagar Brothers =

Pair of Indian singers of the classical dhrupad genre (1900s)

The Junior Dagar Brothers also known as Dagar Bandhu were Nasir Zahiruddin (1933–1994) and Nasir Faiyazuddin (1934–1989), a pair of Indian singers of the classical dhrupad genre. They were the 19th generation of an unbroken chain of the Dagar vani Dhrupad tradition. Their father, vocalist Nasiruddin Khan, died in 1936, and consequently they learned dhrupad from their elder brothers, the Senior Dagar Brothers, Nasir Moinuddin Dagar and Nasir Aminuddin Dagar.

The brothers were born in Indore, Madhya Pradesh. Their musical career unfolded in Delhi. After the untimely demise of Nasir Moinuddin Dagar in Calcutta in 1967, they became the only pair carrying on the jugalbandi singing. The Dagar Brothers took Dhrupad to Europe, America and Japan. In India, they formed the Dhrupad Society to popularise Dhrupad, inviting exponents from all gharanas to share their platform. They also trained many students, including Faiyaz Wasifuddin Dagar, the son of Nasir Faiyazuddin Dagar.

In May 2023, Wasifuddin Dagar claimed that the song "Veera Raja Veera" Ponniyin Selvan: II (2023), with music by A.R. Rehman had been adapted from a 1978 Dhrupad composition by the Junior Dagar Brothers without attribution. The Supreme Court in its judgment in February 2026 gave the direction to add the following line in the song credits: “Composition inspired from the Dagarwani tradition Dhrupad, first recorded as Shiv Stuti by late Ustad Nasir Faiyazuddin Dagar and Ustad Nasir Zahiruddin Dagar, popularly known as Junior Dagar brothers."
