= Who Am I (2023 film) =

- Directed by: Shireesh Khemariya
- Written by: Kallol Mukherjee (Adaptation)
- Story by: Ashok Jamnani
- Produced by: Shirish Prakash
- Starring: Chetan Sharma; Surendra Rajan; Rishika Chandani; Shashie Verma; Jay Tiwari; Vivek Sthapak
- Cinematography: Shashank Virag
- Edited by: Saksham Yadav
- Music by: Abhinav Singh
- Production company: Write Click Production
- Release date: 3 February 2023
- Country: India
- Language: Hindi

Who Am I is an Indian Hindi film starring Chetan Sharma and Rishika Chandani. The film was released on 3 February 2023.

== Production ==
Produced by Write Click Production, the film is based on the novel Ko Aham by Ashok Jamnani. Kallol Mukherjee wrote the adapted screenplay and dialogues, Shirish Prakash was the producer and Shireesh Khemariya was the director. The film was entirely shot in Madhya Pradesh.

== Cast ==
- Chetan Sharma as Bhavitavya/Sadanand
- Surendra Rajan as Swami ji
- Rishika Chandani as Aditi
- Shashie Verma as V.L.N sir
- Jay Tiwari as Young Sadhu
