= Bahauddin Dagar =

Hindustani classical music artiste

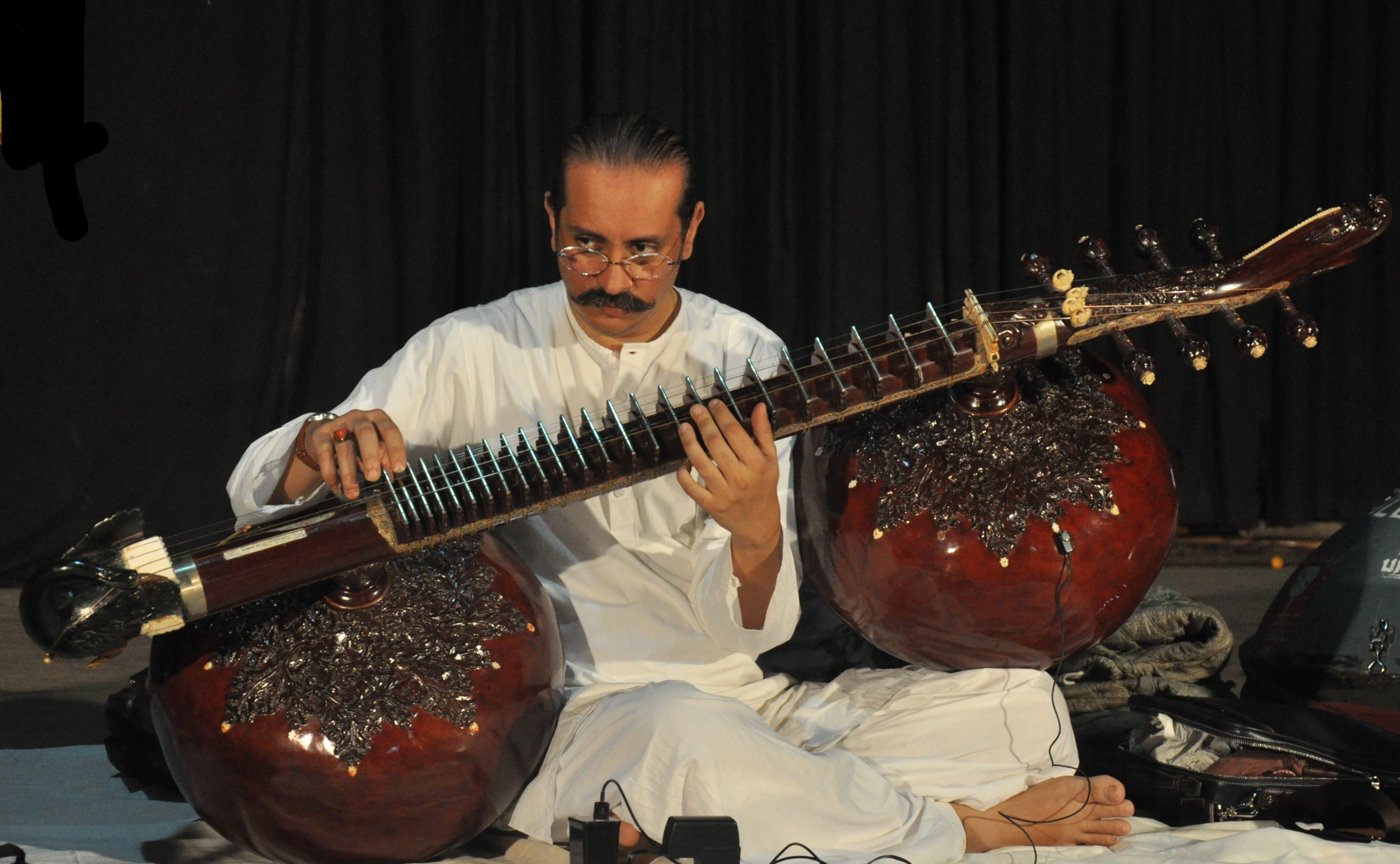
- Dagar in 2013

Background information
- Born: July 17, 1970 (age 56); Chembur, Mumbai, Maharashtra, India
- Genre: Hindustani classical music
- Instrument: Rudra veena
- Labels: Awards: Sangeet Natak Akademi Award in 2012

Mohi Baha'ud-din performs at Kollam, 2013

Baha'ud'din Mohiuddin Dagar (born 17 July 1970) is the rudra veena player and son of north Indian musician Zia Mohiuddin Dagar. He plays rudra veena with the dagarbani style. He represents the 20th generation of Dagar lineage, referring to Nayak Haridas Dagar of the 16th century. However, he traces his ancestry to Baba Gopal Das, who converted to Islam, and became Baba Imam Baksh in the 18th century, making him the representative of the 8th generation.

== Awards and recognition ==
In 2012, he was awarded the Sangeet Natak Akademi Award, the highest award for performing artists, conferred by the Sangeet Natak Akademi, India's National Academy for Music, Dance and Drama.

== Early life and training ==
Dagar started learning the veena from his father Zia Mohiuddin Dagar when he was 16 years old. After the death of his father in 1990, he continued his training under his uncle Zia Fariddudin Dagar.
