= Meend =

Technique in Hindustani music

In Hindustani music, meend (Hindi: मींड, Urdu: مینڈ) refers to a glide from one note to another. It is an essential performance practice, and is used often in vocal and instrumental music. On the veena, sitar, sarangi and other plucked or bowed stringed instruments, it is usually done by pushing the strings across the frets to vary their effective length and tension; compare portamento and finger vibrato. This can be done on wind instruments like the bansuri by using the fingers to cover the holes in a manner that the changes between discrete pitches are imperceptible. It is considered a sort of alankar, or ornament.

Meend is an important part of any classical performance; however, it is a technique not possible on a hand-held harmonium often used in musical concerts (or on the santoor). For this reason, traditionalists singing khyal prefer an accompaniment on an instrument such as a sarangi that can perform meend.
