= Nasir Moinuddin Dagar =

Indian classical singer (1919–1966)

Ustad Nasir Moinuddin Dagar
- Born: c. 1919; Alwar, Rajasthan, British India
- Died: 24 May 1966
- Genres: Hindustani classical, Dhrupad
- Occupation: vocalist
- Instrument: singing
- Member of: Senior Dagar Brothers

Nasir Moinuddin Dagar (c. 1921–1966) was a Hindustani classical dhrupad singer from India, part of the Dagar gharana. He and his younger brother Nasir Aminuddin Dagar performed together, and are best known as the Senior Dagar Brothers.

== Early life and training ==
Moinuddin Dagar was born in Alwar, Rajasthan, the eldest son of musician Nasiruddin Khan of the Dagar lineage. Contemporary sources listed his birth date as 1919, while the Oxford Encyclopaedia of the Music of India listed it as 12 May 1921.

He was initiated into dhrupad singing by his father, who provided strict and rigorous training. He was seventeen when his father died. He supported his mother and five younger siblings by working as a teacher, while receiving training in Jaipur from his uncle Riazuddin Khan. He would go on to train younger brothers Nasir Aminuddin, Nasir Zahiruddin, and Nasir Faiyazuddin, as well as disciples Ritwik Sanyal and Lakshman Bhatta Tailanga.

He left Udaipur after his training, and moved to Bombay in 1947, where he and Nasir Aminuddin started performing. The two brothers had an exceptionally close relationship, with Aminuddin formally accepting him as his musical guru. They first performed for the radio in 1942, and were well regarded as live performers.

== Career and later life ==
Moinuddin Dagar performed primarily with his brother Aminuddin Dagar as the "Dagar Brother" duo, known for jugalbandi. Together, they helped popularise dhrupad for new audiences.

They toured Europe in the 1960s with Nasir Aminuddin Dagar, participating in music events in countries like France, the United Kingdom, Italy, Russia, and Japan. Their November 1964 tour included a stop in Paris, which was recorded and released by UNESCO. Moinuddin Dagar suffered a heart attack while on tour in Europe, and complications would eventually lead to his death.

In 1955, Moinuddin and Aminuddin founded the Bharatiya Sangeet Vidyalay in Benares, and subsequently moved to Delhi to take up jobs at the Bharatiya Kala Kendra in New Delhi. He was, for many years, head of the Bharatiya Kala Kendra's music department.

In 1966, the two moved from Delhi to Bombay, where they founded and taught at the Bharat Sangeet Vidya Bhavan.

Moinuddin died in Bombay on 24 May 1966. The Times of India described his death in middle age as a "severe blow to the 'dhrupad' tradition." He left behind his wife Suraiya, a son, and two daughters.

In 1975, after his death, Aminuddin Dagar founded the Ustad Nasir Moinuddin Dagar Dhrupad Sangeet Ashram in Calcutta in his elder brother's name.

== Style and impact ==
The Times of India described him as "one of the finest exponents of his style."

Vivek Datta described how Moinuddin "not only preserved the values and tradition of the family by sustaining the purity of Dhrupad singing, but also gave it a dynamic impetus which necessarily needs the power of an inspired genius."

Dhrupad.info described him as a "charismatic performer," who "had amazing mastery over the use of the three different kinds of head resonance…which he used with much flair and artistry on the higher notes like ni and sa."

M.R. Gautam described how Moinuddin and Aminuddin Dagar always performed together, how Moinuddin had a "higher pitched voice," and "was endowed with a fertile, artistic imagination and feeling."

== Discography ==
- Dagar Brothers (1965)
- A Musical Anthology of the Orient: India III (1960s?)
- Raga Darbari Kanada: Alapa; Dhamar — Raga Adana (1982)
- Raga Todi in Concert • Calcutta 1957 (1999)
- Bihag Kamboji Malkosh • Calcutta 1955 (2000)
- Dhrupad : Puriya, Pilu Thumri (2002)
- Dhrupad: Bageshree (2002)
- Ragas Bhupali, Shankara: Dhrupad (2004)
- Dhrupad (Megh, Kafi Ki Hori) (2002, 2009)
- Raga Kambhoji: Dhrupad (2004)
- Bageshree Dhrupad (2008)
- Miya Ki Malhar Dhrupad (2009)
- Raga: Puriya, Pilu Thumri (2009)
