= Zia Fariduddin Dagar =

Indian classical musician (1932 – 2013)

- Born: 15 June 1932; Udaipur, Rajasthan
- Died: 8 May 2013 (aged 80); Panvel, near Mumbai, India
- Occupations: Vocalist musician of Dhrupad, Hindustani classical music
- Awards: Sangeet Natak Akademi Award in 1994; Tansen Samman Award in 1993

Zia Fariduddin Dagar (15 June 1932 – 8 May 2013) was an Indian classical vocalist belonging to the Dhrupad tradition, the oldest existing form of north Indian classical music (Hindustani classical music). He was part of the Dagar family of musicians.

He taught at the Dhrupad Kendra in Bhopal with his elder brother Zia Mohiuddin Dagar. He also taught as a visiting professor up to the time of the Babri mosque riots. After the riots, he decided to live at the gurukul of his brother Zia Mohiuddin Dagar at Palaspe near Panvel, close to Mumbai.

He was awarded the 1994 Sangeet Natak Akademi Award in the Hindustani music-vocal category by Sangeet Natak Akademi.

== Early life and training ==
He was born in Udaipur, Rajasthan, where his father, the great Ustad Ziauddin Khansahib, was the court musician for Maharana Bhupal Singh of Udaipur. He was taught Dhrupad vocal and the veena by his father. After his father's death, he continued learning under his elder brother, Ustad Zia Mohiuddin Dagar

== Career ==
He has performed widely in India and abroad, and received the Tansen Samman from the Madhya Pradesh government and the Sangeet Natak Akademi Award. In 2005, he was presented with the Lifetime Achievement Award by the North American Dhrupad Association.

By 1980, he had virtually settled down in Austria, where he taught at the conservatory of Innsbruck teaching Dhrupad in Austria and France (mainly Paris). Once, during a visit to India, one of his disciples, the filmmaker, Mani Kaul came to him and pleaded with him to provide the background score for a film, The Cloud Door (1994) he was making on Madhya Pradesh.

During the making of the film, they spent over two months in Madhya Pradesh, a lot of time in Bhopal. In those days, Shri Arjun Singh was the Chief Minister of Madhya Pradesh. Cultural development was one of his passions. It is because of him that the Bharat Bhavan cultural center came up in Bhopal.

At that time, the Secretary to the Department of Culture in Madhya Pradesh was Ashok Vajpayee. Vajpayee offered to start a government supported school for Dhrupad in Bhopal. Zia Fariduddin agreed to move back to India and to take charge as the teacher at this school. He taught dhrupad for 25 years at this Dhrupad Kendra, under the Ustad Allauddin Khan Music Academy, Bhopal, to students like the Gundecha Brothers, Uday Bhawalkar, Nirmalya Dey and Marianne Svasek.

He was a distinguished guest faculty at 'Dhrupad Sansar', IIT Bombay for a span of 5 years. Dhrupad Sansar was started under the Cell for Human Values to create an appreciation about Indian Classical Arts and Culture among staff and students of the institution.

== Death ==
He was staying and teaching at the Dhrupad Gurukul near Panvel, which was built by his elder brother Ustad Zia Mohiuddin Dagar and continued to perform in India and abroad until his brief illness and death on 8 May 2013.

== Notable students ==
Notable students of Ustaad Zia Fariduddin Dagar include, among others;

- Uday Bhawalkar

== Awards ==
- Rajasthan Sangeet Natak Akademi Award (1988)
- Tansen Samman Award (1993) by the Government of Madhya Pradesh
- Sangeet Natak Akademi Award (1994)
- Sangeet Natak Akademi Tagore Ratna (2011)

== Discography ==
- Chalnat (New Delhi 1998) (Makar Records, Makcd039 The Lyrical Tradition of Dhrupad – 9, 1999)
- Chandrakauns (Moses Church, Amsterdam 1985) (Ragini Sutra, RS 200202, 2002)
- Malkauns (Bombay 1968, rudra veen/vocal jugalbandi) (Country & Eastern, CE 02, 2005)
