= Nasir Aminuddin Dagar =

Indian classical musician (1923–2000)

Aminuddin Dagar
- Born: Nasir Aminuddin Dagar; 20 October 1923; Indore, Indore State, British India
- Died: 28 December 2000; Kolkata, West Bengal, India
- Occupation(s): Singer - dhrupad style of Dagar Gharana; Hindustani classical music
- Awards: Padma Bhushan (1986); Sangeet Natak Akademi Award (1985)

Ustad Nasir Aminuddin Dagar (20 October 1923 – 28 December 2000) was an Indian dhrupad singer in the Dagarvani style, the second-eldest among four Dhrupad singing brothers.

He is also remembered as the younger brother in the legendary jugalbandi or duo of Senior Dagar Brothers. He and his elder brother Ustad Nasir Moinuddin Dagar revived the dhrupad tradition in Dagar Gharana that had fallen off after the death of their father Ustad Nasiruddin Khan Dagar. Ustad Nasiruddin Khan had an early premonition of his death and spent ten years imparting his musical knowledge to his two elder sons. After Ustad Nasiruddin Khan's demise, the brothers trained under Ustad Riyazuddin Khan and Ustad Ziauddin Khan Dagar.

According to Encyclopedia Britannica's profile of Nasir Aminuddin Dagar:

"Nasir Aminuddin Dagar, ...Indian singer, exponent of the dhrupad tradition, a spiritual and intensely demanding form of Hindustani vocal music, involving gesture as well as sound. He and his brothers, who were also dhrupad singers, were believed to be the 19th generation of singers–dating to the 18th century–in the Dagar family."

== Senior Dagar Brothers ==
Young Aminuddin gave his first performance at the age of 11. In the 1940s, Moinuddin and Aminuddin had a meteoric rise as the Senior Dagar Brothers — two of the brightest stars in the Dhrupad singing field. Within themselves, they not only transformed the art of Dhrupad singing but also breathed new life into the form of duet or jugalbandi singing. Previously jugalbandi in classical music had degenerated into a competition between the two singers. Moinuddin and Aminuddin brought back the concept of a harmonious synchronization between the two. In a typical performance, Aminuddin's voice would draw the audience into a deep meditative mood by gradually descending the notes of the lower octaves and Moinuddin would dazzle the listeners with his alankars, ornamentations in the upper octave. After having established Dhrupad in India, they were invited to perform abroad. They visited Russia and Japan. Their music was so charming that Alain Danielou, the renowned musicologist and adviser to UNESCO's International Music Council, invited them to tour Europe and perform under the UNESCO banner in Berlin, Venice, and Paris. In 1964, Europeans listened enthralled to their singing, and newspaper after newspaper declared the glory of Dhrupad and the Senior Dagar Brothers. A review of their performance in Le Monde, dated 17 November 1964, perhaps best expresses the mood of the western audience: "we will remain under the deep impression of an art of such greatness and intensity that...we feel touched and moved to the deepest of our being." Ustad Nasir Moinuddin Dagar died soon after this concert in 1966. Aminuddin, who regarded his brother as his greatest guru and a father substitute, was devastated but continued as a solo performer.

== Documentary film ==
Nasir Aminuddin Dagar was also the subject of a documentary film portrait called The Recluse.

== Dhrupad Sangeet Ashram ==
The next phase of Aminuddin's life unfolded in Kolkata where he came in January 1966 as the founder principal of Birla Academy Swar Sangam. In 1975 he founded his own Dhrupad institute and named after his elder brother Ustad Nasir Moinuddin Dagar Dhrupad Sangeet Ashram. He planned it as an Ashram where disciples will stay close to their guru and learn the subtle nuances of Dhrupad through the age old guru sishya parampara. It is now the oldest surviving institute solely dedicated to the preservation and propagation of dagar-vani Dhrupad. It is here that Aminuddin trained some of the best dhrupad singers of the next generation including Samir Kumar Dutta, Alaka Nandy, Ashoka Dhar (famous as the Nandy Sisters), Sujata Moitra, Gopal Banerjee, Anu Burman and Dr. Samiran Chatterjee. Ustad Aminuddin Dagar sahib also trained legendary Rabindra Sangeet exponent Maya Sen.

Presently the Ashram (Ustad Nasir Moinuddin Dagar Dhrupad Sangeet Ashram) is being organised by renowned artist and disciple of senior Dagar bandhu Aloka Nandy.

== Awards ==
Ustad Nasir Aminuddin Dagar had been honoured with numerous awards and accolades. Below is a list of some important awards that he received:

- Padma Bhushan award by the Government of India (one of the highest civilian honours in India) in 1986
- Sangeet Natak Akademi Award as a vocalist (the most prestigious award in India in the field of performing arts) in 1985
- Swami Haridas Award in 1979
- D.Litt. from Rabindra Bharati University in 1991
- Producer emeritus of All India Radio and Doordarshan (the Indian national television network) from 1986–89

== See also ==
- Younger Dagar Brothers
