= Zia Mohiuddin Dagar =

Hindustani classical musician from India (1929 - 1990)

- Born: 14 March 1929; Udaipur, Rajasthan
- Died: 28 September 1990 (aged 61)
- Genre: Hindustani classical music
- Instrument: Rudra veena
- Labels: Awards: Sangeet Natak Akademi Award in 1981 Kalidas Samman Award by the Madhya Pradesh government in 1986

Ustad Zia Mohiuddin Dagar (14 March 1929 – 28 September 1990), popularly known as Z. M. Dagar, was a North Indian (Hindustani) classical musician, one of the 19th generation of Dagar family dhrupad musicians. He was largely responsible for the revival of the rudra vina as a solo concert instrument.

== Early life and the choice of veena ==
Z. M. Dagar was born in the town of Udaipur, Rajasthan on 14 March 1929 and began musical study with his father, Ustad Ziauddin Khan Dagar, court musician for the Maharana of Udaipur. He was trained both in vocals and in the rudra veena, an instrument used by vocalists to practice melodies. The veena was traditionally not played in public, but the young Zia Mohiuddin adopted it as his primary instrument, giving his first recital at age 16. Although he was discouraged by his father from experimenting with the structure of the veena, he nevertheless modified the instrument after his father's death to better equip it for solo performance, transforming it into a larger bass instrument (sometimes called a 'Dagar veena'): With the help of the instrument house Kanailal & Brother, he enlarged the tumbas (gourds) and dhandhi (hollow neck) to create greater resonance and to allow the notes to sustain longer, in order to better reproduce the techniques used in dhrupad singing. Because of these modifications, the instrument was too heavy to be held in the standard Northern posture (with one tumba on the left shoulder), so he played instead in the Southern posture, with one tumba on the ground and one on his left knee.

== Struggles and hardships ==
After India gained independence in 1947, the princely states were abolished. The Dagar family lost the patronage of the court of Udaipur, and had to seek employment elsewhere. Finally, they arrived in Mumbai. For 25 years, they had to make ends meet by working in garages, selling bread, and rarely, playing instruments for movie scores. They did not have a tanpura, sitar, or veena, let alone a house. There was much cynicism about dhrupad, as his son Mohi Baha'ud-din recounted in an interview.

"Dhrupad? Who'll listen? Rudra veena? Play something else. Long alaaps? So boring!"

== Playing style ==
Z. M. Dagar was known particularly for his slow development of ragas, typically performed only with tanpura accompaniment (he rarely played with pakhawaj), and for his meticulous attention to microtonal inflections.

== Outside India ==
He was very active in the West, associating himself with the American Society for Eastern Arts in Berkeley, California (Zia Mohiuddin Dagar offered 12 weeks of classes during the spring of 1977). Financial support was secured by the Center for World Music from the National Endowment for the Arts and other contributors) and with Wesleyan University, Rotterdam Music Conservatory, and the University of Washington, Seattle, where he was a visiting professor.

== Honours ==
- In 1986, Ustad ji was awarded the Kalidas Samman Award, one of India's most prestigious awards, by the Madhya Pradesh government.
- He also received the Sangeet Natak Academi Award in 1981, the Rajasthan Sangeet Natak Academi award, and the Maharana Kumbha award, to name a few.

== Family ==
His younger brother, Ustad Zia Fariddudin Dagar, was a vocalist and teacher, and his son, Mohi Baha'ud-din, is a veena player.

== Establishment of the Dhrupad Gurukul ==
Established in 1982, the concept of making a Gurukul was entirely Ustad Zia Mohiuddin Dagar's. He envisioned a place where he would sit with his disciple and impart training in the 'Guru Shishya Parampara'; a method in which a few selected students study under one roof whilst staying with the guru. Ustad sahib put at least twenty years of his time and effort to give shape to this idea on his own and thus, the Gurukul came into being in 1982 at Palaspa - a village near Panvel - Mumbai.

== Death ==
Ustad Zia Mohiuddin Dagar died on 28 September 1990.

== Discography ==
=== Albums ===
| Rudra Veena Recital (LP) | His Master's Voice | ECSD 2736 | 1974 |
| Morgonraga (LP, Album) | MNW | MNW 2F | 1974 |
| Raga Mangeyabushan (LP, Album) | Disques Alvarès | LD 114 | 1974 |
| Raga Pancham Kosh (LP, Album) | Auvidis | AV 4514 | 1984 |
| Raga Chandrakauns (LP, Mono) | His Master's Voice | PMLP 3039 | 1989 |
| Raga Yaman (CD, Album) | Nimbus Records | NI 5276 | 1991 |
| Raga Shuddha Todi | Nimbus Records | | 1994 |
| Todi, Ahir Lalit, Panchamkauns (CD, Album) | Raga Records | RAGA-219 | 1998 |
| Raga Yaman / Raga Shuddha Todi (2xCD, Album) | Nimbus Records | NI 7047/8 | 2000 |
| Marwa, Bageshree (CD, Album) | Raga Records | RAGA-222 | 2001 |
| Z.M. Dagar* & Z.F. Dagar* - Raag Malkauns, Bombay 1968 (CD) | Country & Eastern | CE 02 | 2005 |
| Z.M. Dagar* & Z.F. Dagar* - Ragini Miyan Ki Todi (CD) | Country & Eastern | CE19 | 2011 |
| Zia Mohiuddin Dagar* & Pandit Taranath - Live in Stockholm 1969 (CD) | Country & Eastern | CE36 | 2015 |
| Untitled (Cass, Album) | CBS | UD-001 | Unknown |
