= Dhrupad =

Ancient genre of classical Indian music

Dhrupad is a genre in Hindustani classical music from the Indian subcontinent. It is the oldest known style of major vocal styles associated with Hindustani classical music (for example in the Haveli Sangeet of Pushtimarg Sampradaya), and is also related to the South Indian Carnatic tradition. It is a term of Sanskrit origin, derived from dhruva (ध्रुव, immovable, permanent) and pada (पद, verse). The roots of Dhrupad are ancient. It is discussed in the Hindu Sanskrit text Natyashastra (~200 BCE – 200 CE), and other ancient and medieval Sanskrit texts, such as chapter 33 of Book 10 in the Bhagavata Purana (~800–1000 CE), where the theories of music and devotional songs for Krishna are summarized.

The term denotes both the verse form of the poetry and the style in which it is sung. It is spiritual, heroic, thoughtful, virtuous, embedding moral wisdom or solemn form of song-music combination. Thematic matter ranges from the religious and spiritual (mostly in praise of Hindu deities) to royal panegyrics, musicology and romance.

A Dhrupad has at least four stanza, called Sthayi (or Asthayi), Antara, Sanchari and Abhoga. The Sthayi part is a melody that uses the middle octave's first tetrachord and the lower octave notes. The Antara part uses the middle octave's second tetrachord and the higher octave notes. The Sanchari part is the development phase, which holistically builds using parts of Sthayi and Antara already played, and it uses melodic material built with all the three octave notes. The Abhoga is the concluding section, that brings the listener back to the familiar starting point of Sthayi, albeit with rhythmic variations, with diminished notes like a gentle goodbye, that are ideally mathematical fractions such as dagun (half), tigun (third) or caugun (fourth). Sometimes a fifth stanza called Bhoga is included. Though usually related to philosophical or Bhakti (emotional devotion to a god or goddess) themes, some Dhrupads were composed to praise kings.

Dhrupad was first sang and complied by Raja Man Singh Tomar of Gwalior. The tradition of Dhrupad is recorded back to saints of Braj (Mathura) namely Swami Haridas (Gwalior), Surdas, Govind Swami, Asht Sakha of Haveli Sangeet and followed by Jagannath Kaviral (Gwalior) Tansen (Gwalior) and Baiju Bawara (Gwalior). When Dhrupad composition are based on Bhagwan Shri Vishnu or his incarnations thereof, is called Vishnupad.

== History ==
An illustrious Dhrupad school of music was firmly established at Gwalior. Muslim scholars also mentions a musical genre called Dhrupad in Ain-i-Akbari of Abu Fazl (1593). Extensive works attribute much of the material to musicians such as (Jagannath Kaviral, Gopala, Baiju Bawra, Haridas, Tansen, Mohamud and Bhagwant) in the court of Man Singh Tomar (fl. 1486–1516) of Gwalior which are well documented in Man Singh's Mankutuhal. In these accounts from the Mughal court Dhrupad is portrayed as a musical form which is relatively new; and according to Sanyal, most sources agree that Drupad owes its origin to the court of Man Singh Tomar. Ravi Shankar states that the form developed from the prabandha and flourished starting in the fifteenth century in Gwalior. The 16th century Bhakti saint and court-musician of Gwalior Swami Haridas (also in the Nimbarka Sampradaya), was a well known dhrupad singer with songs dedicated to Krishna.He later joined as the court musician in the Mughal court with Tansen who was famous, among other counterparts, for his Dhrupad compositions.

Dhrupad is ancient, and it has another genre of music called Khyal (Gwalior) (it has two parts Sthayi and Antara) evolved from it. Dhrupad is solemn music, uplifting and heroic, pure and spiritual. Khyal adds ornamental notes, shorter, moody and celebratory.

Dhrupad probably obtained its name from dhruvapada mentioned in Natyashastra to denote structured songs. It is one of the core forms of classical music found all over the Indian subcontinent. The word comes from Dhruva which means immovable and permanent. It is spiritual, heroic, thoughtful, virtuous, embedding moral wisdom or solemn form of song-music combination. The Yugala Shataka of Shri Shribhatta in the Nimbarka Sampradaya, written in 1294 CE, contains Dhrupad lyrics.

The ancient practice of dancing on Dhrupad has been reintroduced into recent times by Dr. Puru Dadheech. Dr Dadheech is India's Kathak dancer to bring 'Dhrupad' on the formal Kathak stage and this composition in 28 matra.

== Nature and practice ==
Dhrupad as it is known today is performed by a solo singer or a small number of singers in unison to the beat of the pakhavaj rather than the tabla. The vocalist is usually accompanied by two tanpuras, the players sitting close behind, with the percussionist at the right of the vocalist. Traditionally the primary instrument used for dhrupad has been the Rudra Veena, but the surbahar and the sursringar have also long been used for this music. Preferably, any instrument used for Dhrupad should have a deep bass register and long sustain.

Like all Indian classical music, dhrupad is modal and monophonic, with a single melodic line and no chord progression. Each raga has a modal frame - a wealth of micro-tonal ornamentations (gamak) are typical.

The text is preceded by a wholly improvised section, the alap. The alap in dhrupad is sung using a set of syllables, popularly derived from a Vedic mantras and beejakshars, in a recurrent, set pattern: a re ne na, té te re ne na, ri re re ne na, te ne toom ne (this last group is used in the end of a long phrase). These syllables are also used widely in different permutations and combinations. Dhrupad styles have long elaborate alaps, their slow and deliberate melodic development gradually bringing an accelerating rhythmic pulse. In most styles of dhrupad singing it can easily last an hour, broadly subdivided into the alap proper (unmetered), the jor (with steady rhythm) and the jhala (accelerating strumming) or nomtom, when syllables are sung at a very rapid pace. Then the composition is sung to the rhythmic accompaniment: the four lines, in serial order, are termed sthayi, antara, sanchari and aabhog.

Compositions exist in the metres (tala) tivra (7 beats), sul (10 beats) and chau (12 beats) - a composition set to the 10-beat jhap tala is called a sadra while one set to the 14-beat dhamar is called a dhamar. The latter is seen as a lighter musical form, associated with the Holi spring festival.

Dhrupad has also been associated with the Hindu philosophy of sacred sound. The concept of Nada-Brahman, which describes sound as a manifestation of the ultimate reality or brahman. It has influenced the Hindu musical thought and is associated with developing raga and tala. In the studies of Hindu music, Dhrupad is included among the classical and devotional musical traditions through which such concepts are expressed. Dhrupad composition have also incorporated devotional themes and has highlighted the spiritual significance of musical sound.

Alongside concert performance, the practice of singing dhrupad in temples continues, though only a small number of recordings have been made. It bears little resemblance to concert dhrupad: there is very little or no alap; percussion such as bells and finger cymbals, not used in the classical setting, are used here, and the drum used is a smaller, older variant called mrdang, quite similar to the mridangam.

== Gharanas and style ==
Brihaddeshi, a circa eighth-century text attributed to Mataṅga, classifies songs into five stylistic categories (gitis): shuddha, bhinna, gauri, veswara, and sadharani. Four styles (banis or vanis) of dhrupad singing were popular in the late sixteenth century at Mughal Emperor Akbar's court: Gauharvani, Khandharvani, Dagarvani, and Nauharvani. Tradition traces the origin of the four banis back to the five gitis, but there is no solid evidence of a connection.

There are a number of dhrupad gharanas: "houses", or family styles.

The best-known gharana is the Dagar family, who sing in the Dagar vani or Dagar gharana. The Dagar style puts great emphasis on alap and for several generations their singers have performed in pairs (often pairs of brothers). The Dagars are Muslims but sing Hindu texts of Gods and Goddesses.

The Bishnupur gharana features Manilal Nag, Mita Nag, and Madhuvanti Pal among others.

From the state of Bihar comes the Darbhanga gharana, Dumraon gharana (Buxar) and the Bettiah gharana. The Mallicks of the Darbhanga gharana are linked to the Khandar vani and Gauharvani. Ram Chatur Mallick, Vidur Mallick, Abhay Narayan Mallick, Sanjay Kumar Mallick, Laxman Bhatt Tailang and Siyaram Tiwari were well known personalities of Darbhanga gharana in the 20th century. Dhrupad of the Darbhanga gharana has a strong representation in Vrindaban owing to late Vidur Mallik, who lived and taught in Vrindavan during the 1980s and 1990s. In the 21st century, the legacy of late Vidur Mallick continued through his sons, late Ram Kumar Mallick and Prem Kumar Mallick, who remain leading contemporary exponents of the Darbhanga Dhrupad tradition and gained international acclaim for their representative style of the gharana. The Darbhanga tradition is further carried forward into the next generation by his grandsons, Santosh Kumar Mallick, Samit Kumar Mallick, Sahitya Mallick, Sangeet Mallick, Prashant Mallick & Nishant Mallick, all of whom continue to perform and preserve the Mallick lineage of dhrupad.

Great female Dhrupad artists include Asgari Bai, Alaka Nandy, Ashoka Dhar, Madhu Bhatt Tailang, the Pakistani singer Aliya Rasheed, and the Italian singer Amelia Cuni.

Dumraon gharana - Dhrupad traditions of Bihar Dumraon gharana is an ancient tradition of dhrupad music nearly 500 years old. This gharana flourished under the patronage of the kings of Dumraon Raj when it was founded. The drupad style (vanis) of this gharana is Gauhar, Khandar, and Nauharvani. The founder of this gharana was Manikchand Dubey and Anup chand Dubey. Both artists were awarded by Mugal Emperor Shahjahan. The father of Bismillah Khan who also belonged to the Dumraon gharana tradition. He usually played Shahnai in Dhrupad style. Famous living singers of Dumraon gharana (Buxar) include Ramjee Mishra, a representative of Dumraon gharana.

Many books have been written by this gharana, like Shree Krishn Ramayan, by Ghana rang Dubey, Sur-prakash, Bhairav, Prakash, Rash-Prakash, written by Jay Prakash Dubey and Prakash Kavi. Abishek Sangit Pallav by Dr. Arvind Kumar.

The Mishras practised Gaurhar, Dagur, Nauhar and Khandar styles. This gharana flourished under the patronage of the kings of Bettiah Raj. Falguni Mitra is an exponent of this gharana in the present generation.

Some of the Dhrupad exponents and virtuosos are Gokulotsavji Maharaj, Uday Bhawalkar, Ritwik Sanyal, Nirmalya Dey, Kshitipal Mallick, Ram Chatur Mallick, Vidur Mallick, Ram Kumar Mallick, Prem Kumar Mallick, Santosh Kumar Mallick, Samit Kumar Mallick, Sahitya Mallick, Sangeet Mallick, Mallick Brothers and the Gundecha Brothers.

== Seminars ==
In an effort to link tradition and scientific methodologies, the ITC Sangeet Research Academy's Scientific Research Department has been organizing symposia and workshops since 1987. The objective of these workshops/symposia is to create awareness of research in various fields of music. In 2013 the academy conducted a Dhrupad seminar in association with the National Centre for the Performing Arts (India) (NCPA, Mumbai) where Dr. Puru Dadheech participated as speaker to discuss the origin and predecessors of Dhrupad.

Prof. Richard Widdess (Head, Department of Music, School of Oriental and African Studies, University of London, UK) and Dr. Dadheech, (Indore, India) discussed the origin of Dhrupad at length. The latter established that Dhrupads are older than the times of Raja Mansingh Tomar.

== Documentaries ==
The filmmaker Mani Kaul while under tutelage of Ustad Zia Mohiuddin Dagar and Ustad Zia Fariduddin Dagar made one of the first documentaries on Dhrupad music in 1982 called Dhrupad. This Hindi language full-length documentary features both his gurus along with the young Bahauddin Dagar - the son of Zia Mohiuddin Dagar. The film produced by the Films Division of India was shot in locations associated with history of Dhrupad in – Fatehpur Sikri and Jaipur's Jantar Mantar articulating the theory and the practice of the musical form.

== Bibliography ==
- Caudhurī, Vimalakānta Rôya (2000). The Dictionary of Hindustani Classical Music. Motilal Banarsidass. ISBN 978-81-208-1708-1.
- Sanyal, Ritwik; Widdess, Richard (2004), Dhrupad: Tradition and Performance in Indian Music, Ashgate Publishing, Ltd., ISBN 9780754603795
- Te Nijenhuis, Emmie (1974). Indian Music: History and Structure. BRILL Academic. ISBN 90-04-03978-3.
