= Malhar (disambiguation) =

Malhar is a Hindustani classical raga.

Malhar may also refer to:

- Malhar (family of ragas)
- Malhar, Chhattisgarh, a town in India
- Malhar (festival), a college festival of St. Xavier's College, Mumbai, India
- Malhargad ("Malhar Fort"), a hill fort in Maharashtra, India
- Malhar (film), an Indian bilingual drama film

People

- Malhar Kendurkar, Indo-Canadian astrophysicist
- Malhar Pandya, Indian actor
- Malhar Patel (born 1983), Indian-Kenyan cricketer
- Malhar Rao Holkar (r. 1732–1766), a noble of the Maratha Empire of India, founder of the dynasty that ruled the Indore State
- Malhar Rao Holkar II (r. 1766–1767), a ruler of the Indore State of present-day India
- Malhar Rao Holkar III (r. 1811–1833), a ruler of the Indore State of present-day India
- Malhar Rao Gaekwad, a ruler of the Baroda State of present-day India
- Malhar Thakar (born 1990), Indian actor
- Rohit, a fictional character in the 2012 Indian TV series Lakhon Mein Ek, portrayed by Karan Grover

== See also ==
- Malar (disambiguation)
- Mallar (disambiguation)
