= Malar =

Malar may refer to:

== Places ==
=== Tamil Nadu, India ===
- Malarajamkuppam, Kandamangalam block, Viluppuram Taluk, Viluppuram District
- Malarasankuppam, Gingee Taluk, Viluppuram District
- Thirumalarajapuram, Poonamallee Taluk, Thiruvallur District
- Thirumalaraya Samudram, Pudukkottai Taluk, Pudukkottai

=== Elsewhere ===
- Malar, Iran, a city in Iran
- Malar, Mazandaran, a village in Iran
- Malar, Pakistan, a town in Pakistan
- Malar, Bap, a desert panchayat village in Bap tehsil, Jodhpur District, Rajasthan, India
- Malar, Bhopalgarh, a panchayat village in Bhopalgarh tehsil, Jodhpur District, Rajasthan, India
- Mälaren, also known as Lake Malar, the third largest lake in Sweden
- St Mathias, Goa, also called Malar; a village in Goa, India

== People ==
- Augustín Malár (1894–1945), a Slovak general during the Second World War
- Joanne Malar, Canadian swimmer
- Malar, a character in the 2015 film Premam, portrayed by Sai Pallavi

== Other ==
- Relating to the cheek (from Latin)
  - Malar rash, a disease sign consisting of a butterfly-shaped rash on the cheeks and nose
  - Malar bone, the zygomatic bone
- Malar (Forgotten Realms), a deity in the Forgotten Realms campaign setting of Dungeons & Dragons
- Malhar, a raga in Indian classical music

== See also ==
- Mallar (disambiguation)
- Malhar (disambiguation)
