= Adana (raga) =

Indian raga

- Thaat: Asavari
- Time of day: Late night, 12–3
- Arohana: S R M P Ṉ P M P Ṉ Ṡ; S R G̱ M P Ṉ P Ṡ
- Avarohana: Ṡ Ḏ Ṉ P G̱ M R S
- Vadi: Sa
- Samavadi: Pa
- Synonym: Adana Kanada
- Similar: Darbari Kanada

Adana is an Indian raag. It is also called Adana Kanada. It is often sung or played in drut laya after a vilambit composition in raga Darbari Kanada, as Adana is straighter than Darbari in its chalan, thus allowing faster passages. The flow of this raga is similar to a mix of Madhumad Sarang / Megh and Darbari. Another common vivadi some artists use sparingly is shuddha nishad which enhances the Saranga mood of the raga.

== Aroha and avaroha ==
Arohana:

- S R M P Ṉ P M P Ṉ Ṡ
- S R G̱ M P Ṉ P Ṡ

Avarohana: Ṡ Ḏ Ṉ P G̱ M R S

== Vadi and samavadi ==
- Vadi : Sa
- Samvadi : Pa

== Organization and relationships ==
Flat Ga is usually omitted in ascent and in descent always appears in the distinctive Kanada phrase g m R S. Flat Dha is present in descent, but one should never linger on it. In fact it is omitted by some musicians completely. Most movements are in the upper tetrachord, around high Sa. It is very common to begin the elaboration of this raga with high Sa.

Adana is part of the Kanada Raga group.

== Samay (time) ==
Late Night (12 am – 3 am)

== Historical information ==
Ādāna was previously called Āḍḍānā.

Adana was a major raga in the 17th century and a combination of the then current ragas Malhar and Kanada. In a ragamala painting from Mewar it is depicted as an ascetic man sitting on a tiger skin, however, Somnath describes him as Kama the god of love. His Adana was quite different from the raga as it is performed today.

== Origins ==
=== Important recordings ===
- Singh Bandhu, "Taan Kaptaan"

== Film songs ==
Song	Movie	Composer	Artists
Manmohan Man Mein Ho Tumhi	Kaise Kahoon	S. D. Burman	Mohammad Rafi & Suman Kalyanpur & S. D. Batish
Jhanak Jhanak Paayal Baaje	Jhanak Jhanak Payal Baaje	Vasant Desai	Amir Khan (singer) & Chorus
Ai Dil Mujhe Aisi Jagah Le Chal	Arzoo (1950 film)	Anil Biswas (composer)	Talat Mahmood
Radhike Tune Bansari Churai	Beti Bete	Shankar–Jaikishan	Mohammad Rafi
Aap Ki Nazaron Ne Samjha	Anpadh	Madan Mohan (composer)	Lata Mangeshkar

=== Language: Tamil ===
Song	Movie	Composer	Singer
Veera Raja Veera	Ponniyin Selvan 2	A. R. Rahman	Shankar Mahadevan, K.S. Chitra, Harini

== Literature ==
(most) entries due to: Moutal, Patrick (1991), Hindustāni Rāga-s Index, New Dheli: Munshiram Manoharlal Publishers Pvt Ltd, ISBN 81-215-0525-7

- Bagchee, Sandeep (1998), Nād; Understanding Rāga Music, Mumbai: eshwar, ISBN 81-86982-07-8
- Bhatkhande, Vishnu Nayaran (1968–1973), Hindusthānī Sangīta Paddhaati: Kramika Pustaka Mālikā (6 vols.), Hathras: Sangeet Karyalaya
- Bhatkhande, Vishnu Nayaran (1968–1975), Hindusthānī Sangīta Paddhaati: Sangīta Śāstra (4 vols), Hathras: Sangeet Karyalaya
- Bhatkhande, Vishnu Nayaran, Svara Mālikā, Hathras: Sangeet Karyalaya
- Bhatt, Balvantray (1977), Bhāvaranga Lahāri, Varanasi: Motilal Barnasidas
- Bor, Joep (c. 1997), The Raga Guide, Charlottesville, Virginia: Nimbus Records, archived from the original on 3 December 2003
- Gandharva, Kumar (1965), Anūparāgavilāsa, Bombay: Mauj Prakashan
- Kaufmann, Walter (1968), The ragas of North India, Calcutta, New Dheli, Bombay: Oxford & IBH Publishing Company
- Khan, Raja Nawab Ali (1924), Māriphunnagamāta, Hathras: Sangeet Karyalaya
- Nijenhuis, E. te (1976), The Ragas of Somanatha Vol I-II, Leiden: E.J.Brill
- Patwaradan, Narayan Rao (1972), Tarala Prabandhāvalī, Rajasthan: Vanasthali Vidyapith
- Patwaradan, Vinayak Rao (1961–1974), Raga Vijñāna (7 vols), Poona: Sangeet Gaurav Granthamala
- Phulambrikar, Krishnarao, Rāga Sangraha, Poona
- Ratanjankar, S.N., Abhinava Gīta Manjarī, Bombay: Popular Prakashan
- Shah, Jaisuklal (1972), Kānada Ke Prakāra, Bombay: Jaisuklal Shah
- Srivastava, Jaisuklai (1969), Malhāra Ke Prakāra, Bombay: Jaisuklal Shah
- Thakur, Omkarnath (1955–1975), Sangītāñjali (6 vols), Varanasi
- Vaze, Ramkrishna Narahar (1938), Sangīta Kala Prakāśa, Poona: Ramkrishna Sangeet Vidyalaya
