= Megh Malhar =

Hindustani classical raga

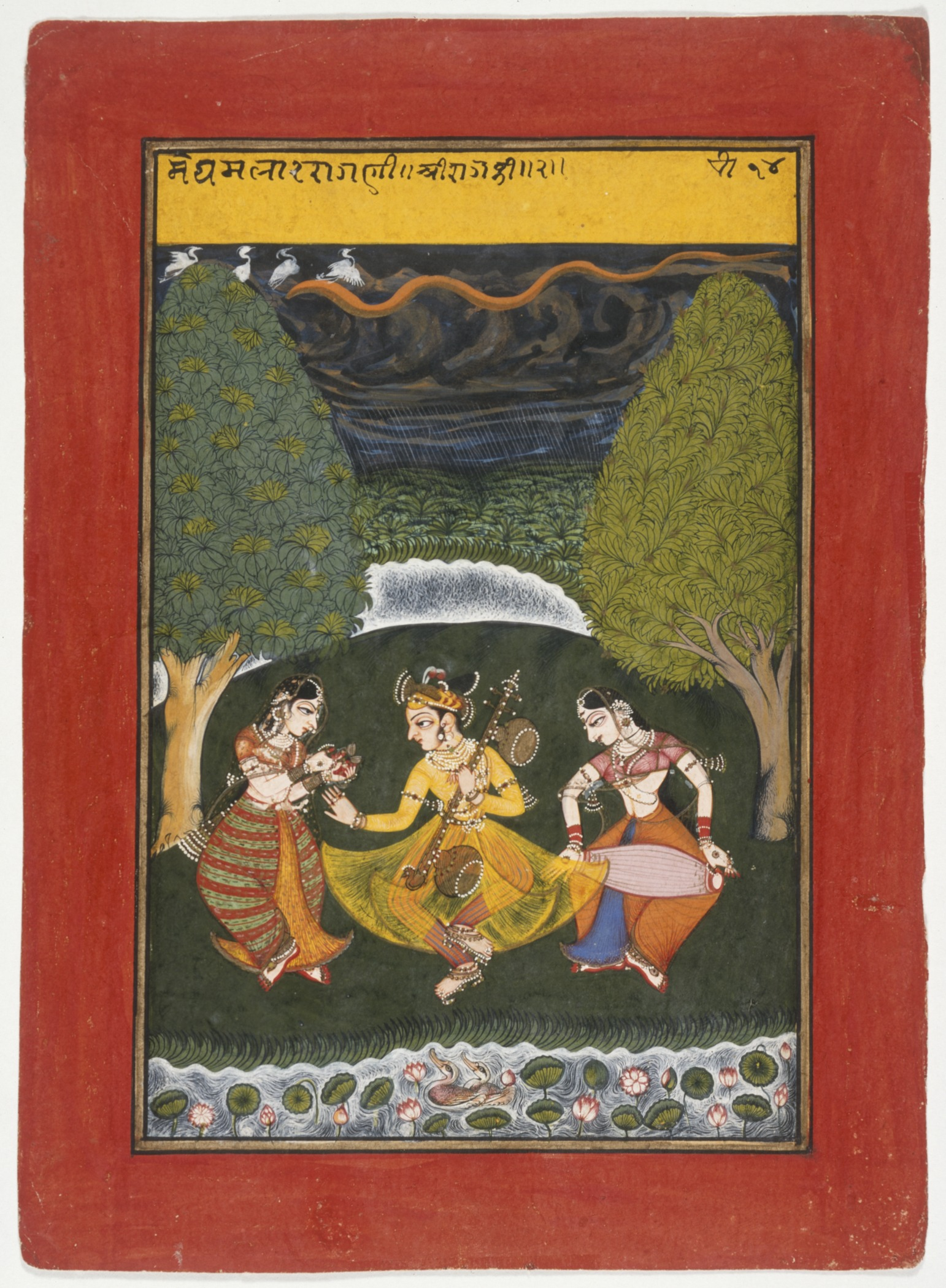
- Thaat: Kafi
- Season: Rainy season
- Arohana: S R P m P n (d) N S
- Avarohana: S' n P m R g~ m R S
- Pakad: 'n 'P R g~ m R S
- Vadi: Sa
- Samavadi: Pa

Megh Malhar is a Hindustani classical raga. The name derives from the Sanskrit word Megh, meaning cloud. Legends say that this raga has the power to bring out rains in the area where it is sung. Megh Malhar is similar to raga Megh with a tint of Malhar in it.

According to Indian classical vocalist Pandit Jasraj, Megh Malhar is a seasonal raag and is sung as invitation to rains.

== Theory ==
=== Aroh & Avaroh ===
- Aroh: S R P m P n (d) N S
- Avaroh: S' n P m R g~ m R S

=== Vadi & Samavadi ===
In this raga vadi is Sa and samavadi is P

=== Pakad ===
'n 'P R g~ m R S

=== Organization & Relationships ===
Related ragas: Ragas of Malhar family, namely Megh, Miyan ki Malhar, Gaud Malhar, Ramdasi Malhar, Dhuliya Malhar, etc. as well as Madhmad Sarang
Madhyamavati rāga in Carnatic music can be considered as equivalent to it.

Thaat: Kafi.

== Behavior ==
=== Samay (Time) ===
Late night.

=== Seasonality ===
Raga Megh Malhar is commonly associated with the monsoon season.

== Historical Information ==
=== Legend ===
There is legend stating that Tansen's physical agony after singing Raga Deepak (Poorvi Thaat) was pacified by listening to Raga Megh Malhar rendered by two sisters, Tana and Riri.

== Film Songs ==
=== Language:Tamil ===
| Song | Film | Composer | Singer |
|---|---|---|---|
| Arbutha Leelaigalai | Sivagami | K. V. Mahadevan | M. K. Thyagaraja Bhagavathar |
| Engiruntho Vanthan | Padikkadha Medhai | K. V. Mahadevan | Seerkazhi Govindarajan |
| Thirumal Perumaikku (Ragamalika) | Thirumal Perumai | K. V. Mahadevan | T. M. Soundararajan |
| Malarodu Vilaiyaadum | Deiva Balam | Aswathama | P. B. Srinivas, S. Janaki |
| Muthukkalo Kangal | Nenjirukkum Varai | M.S.Viswanathan | T. M. Soundararajan, P. Susheela |
| Pachaikili Muthucharam | Ulagam Sutrum Valiban | M.S.Viswanathan | T. M. Soundararajan, P. Susheela |
| Velale Vizhigal | Ennai Pol Oruvan | M.S.Viswanathan | T. M. Soundararajan, P. Susheela |
| Sandhanathil Nala Vaasam | Praptham | M.S.Viswanathan | T. M. Soundararajan, P. Susheela |
| Kana Kaanum | Agni Sakshi | M.S.Viswanathan | S. P. Balasubrahmanyam, Saritha |
| Aagaya Gangai | Dharma Yuddham | Illayaraja | Malaysia Vasudevan, S. Janaki |
| Anandham Then Sindhum | Mann Vasanai | Illayaraja | Malaysia Vasudevan, S. Janaki |
| Nila Kayuthu (Sri Ragam traces too) | Sakalakala Vallavan | Illayaraja | Malaysia Vasudevan, S. Janaki |
| Adi Penney | Mullum Malarum | Illayaraja | Jency Anthony |
| Dhagam Edukira Neram | Enakkaga Kaathiru | Illayaraja | Uma Ramanan |
| En Kalyana | Azhage Unnai Aarathikkiren | Illayaraja | Vani Jairam |
| Solaikuyile | Ponnu Oorukku Pudhusu | Illayaraja | S. P. Sailaja |
| Eeramana Rojave | Ilamai Kaalangal | Illayaraja | K. J. Yesudas, S. Janaki(little girl's voice) |
| Thazham Poovae Vaasam | Kai Kodukkum Kai | Illayaraja | S. P. Balasubrahmanyam, S. Janaki |
| Sevvanthi pookalil | Mella Pesungal | Illayaraja | Deepan Chakravarthy, Uma Ramanan |
| Kuyile Kuyile | Aan Paavam | Illayaraja | Malaysia Vasudevan, K.S. Chitra |
| Nee Pogum Pathayil | Gramatthu Minnal | Illayaraja | Malaysia Vasudevan |
| Ejamaan Kaladi | Ejamaan | Illayaraja | Malaysia Vasudevan |
| Azhagaana Mancha Pura | Ellame En Rasathan | Illayaraja | Mano, S. Janaki |
| Nee Thane Enthan | Ninaivellam Nithya | Illayaraja | S. P. Balasubrahmanyam |
| Kavithai Paadu | Thendrale Ennai Thodu | Illayaraja | S. P. Balasubrahmanyam |
| Thanga Nilavukkul | Rickshaw Mama | Illayaraja | S. P. Balasubrahmanyam |
| Ponmeni Uruguthey | Moondram Pirai | Illayaraja | S. Janaki |
| Adi Aadivarum Pallaakku | I Love India | Illayaraja | S. Janaki |
| Kadhal Vennila | Lakshmi Vandhachu | Ravindran | S. Janaki |
| Siraiyinil Veenai | Kaalaiyum Neeye Maalaiyum Neeye | Devendran | S. Janaki |
| Pon Vaniley | Koocham | Gangai Amaran | K. J. Yesudas |
| Tholvi Nilayenna | Oomai Vizhigal | Manoj–Gyan | P. B. Srinivas, Aabavanan |
| Jalakku Jalakku | Endrendrum Kadhal | Manoj–Gyan | Sujatha Mohan, S. N. Surendar |
| Thom Karuvil Irundom | Star | A. R. Rahman | Shankar Mahadevan |
| Columbus | Jeans | A. R. Rahman | A. R. Rahman |
| Thaiyya Thaiyya | Uyire | A. R. Rahman | Sukhwinder Singh, Malgudi Subha, Palakkad Sriram |
| Alangatti Mazhai | Thenali | A. R. Rahman | Kamal Haasan, Srinivas, Sujatha Mohan, Baby Silono Rath & Baby Sharanya Srinivas |
| Vaan Varuvaan | Kaatru Veliyidai | A. R. Rahman | Shashaa Tirupati |
| Thumbi Thullal (Abheri traces also) | Cobra | A. R. Rahman | Nakul Abhyankar, Shreya Ghoshal |
| Anandham Anandham | Murai Maman | Vidyasagar | P. Unni Krishnan, Sujatha Mohan, Manorama |
| Aiyyarettu | Majaa | Vidyasagar | Shankar Mahadevan, Anuradha Sriram |
| Edhedho Karpanai | Vaai Kozhuppu | Chandrabose | TL Thyagarajan, Lalitha Sagari |
| Vizhamale Irukka Mudiyuma | Student Number 1 | M. M. Keeravaani | S. P. B. Charan, K.S. Chitra |
| Aadiyile Sedhi | En Aasai Machan | Deva | K.S. Chitra |
| Mamarakkuyile Maamarakuyile | En Aasai Rasave | Deva | S. P. Balasubrahmanyam, Swarnalatha |
| Uthu Uthu Paakathinga | Veeram Vilanja Mannu | Deva | P. Unnikrishnan, Swarnalatha |
| Athipazham Sivappa | Raja Pandi | Deva | S. P. Balasubrahmanyam, K. S. Chithra |
| Paathi Nila | Kamarasu | S. A. Rajkumar | S. P. Balasubrahmanyam, K. S. Chithra |
| Va Va Vanam Ingu Thooramillai | Minor Mappillai | Isaivanan | S. P. Balasubrahmanyam, K. S. Chithra |
| Dhavanipotta Deepavali | Sandakozhi | Yuvan Shankar Raja | Vijay Yesudas, Shreya Ghoshal |
| Thaaliyae Thevaiyillai | Thaamirabharani | Yuvan Shankar Raja | Hariharan, Bhavatharini |
| Kaatrukku Kaatrukku | Thulluvadho Ilamai | Yuvan Shankar Raja | Harish Raghavendra, Harini, Febi Mani, Sunder Rajan |
| Dheivangal Ellam | Kedi Billa Killadi Ranga | Yuvan Shankar Raja | Vijay Yesudas |
| Anbae Anbae | Idhu Kathirvelan Kadhal | Harris Jayaraj | Harish Raghavendra, Harini |
| Ivan Yaaro | Minnale | Harris Jayaraj | P. Unni Krishnan, Harini |
| Nenjangootil | Dishyum | Vijay Antony | Jayadev, Rajalakshmi |
| Chembaruthi Poo | Vinnukum Mannukum | Sirpy | Arunmozhi, K.S. Chitra |
| Chinna Chinna Idangalai | Chinna Madam | Sirpy | Mano, Sujatha Mohan |
| Paathi Kadhal | Modhi Vilayadu | Colonial Cousins | Bombay Jayashree, Sunitha Sarathy |
| Kannum Kannum | Sundhara Travels | Bharani | Krishnaraj |
