= Megh (raga) =

Hindustani raga

- Thaat: Kafi
- Time of day: Any time during the rainy season
- Season: Rainy season
- Arohana: S M R M P Ṉ Ṡ
- Avarohana: Ṡ Ṉ P M R M Ṉ̣ R S
- Pakad: R R S Ṉ̣ S M R P M R Ṉ̣ S
- Vadi: Sa
- Samavadi: Pa
- Equivalent: Madhyamavathi (Carnatic); Egyptian Pentatonic Scale (Western)

Megh is a Hindustani classical raga. The meaning of megh in Sanskrit is 'cloud'. Hence this raga is mostly sung or played in the monsoon season. Another raga which describes rain is raga Malhar. These two ragas were merged and a new raga developed, raga Megh Malhar. The Carnatic music equivalent of this raga is Madhyamavati.

== Theory ==
Arohana & Avarohana

Arohana: S M R M P Ṉ Ṡ

Avarohana: Ṡ Ṉ P M R M Ṉ̣ R S

Pakad

R R S Ṉ̣ S M R P M R Ṉ̣ S

Vadi & Samavadi

In this raga vadi is Sa and samavadi is Pa – Re is used a lot but always sliding down from M, n always slides from P

Organization & Relationships

Related ragas: Ragas of Malhar family, namely Megh Malhar, Miyan ki Malhar, Gaud Malhar, Ramdasi Malhar, Dhuliya Malhar, etc. as well as Madhmad Sarang.
Thaat: Kafi.

Mixture

The meaning of Megh in Sanskrit is 'Cloud'. This raga is usually sung or played in the Monsoon season. Another raga which describes rain is raga Malhar. Merging these two gives a new raga: Megh Malhar, which has elements of both these ragas.

== Behaviour ==
Samay (Time)

Late night.

Seasonality

Raga Megh is associated with the monsoon.

Rasa

Gambhir rasa

== Origins ==
This is one of the very old ragas found in Indian classical music. This raga is connected to Lord Krishna, when he lifted Govardhan Parvat (mountain) on his little finger during the Govardhan leela.

== Film songs ==
=== Language: Hindi ===
Song	Film	Year	Composer	Singer
Khaike Pan Banaraswala	Don	1978	Kalyanji-Anandji	Kishore Kumar
Teri Tasveer Ko	Sawan Ko Aane Do	1979	Raj Kamal	K. J. Yesudas
Kahan Se Aaye Badra	Chashme Buddoor	1981	Raj Kamal	K. J. Yesudas, Haimanti Shukla
Chaiyya Chaiyya (Deviates in between at a few points)	Dil Se..	1998	A. R. Rahman	Sukhwinder Singh, Sapna Awasthi
Dheem Ta Dare	Thakshak	1999	A. R. Rahman	Surjo Bhattacharya
Munni Badnaam Hui	Dabangg	2010	Lalit Pandit	Mamta Sharma
Shankara Re Shankara	Tanhaji: The Unsung Warrior	2020	Mehul Vyas	Adarsh Shinde
Sharaarat (Loosely based)	Dhurandhar	2025	Shashwat Sachdev	Madhubanti Bagchi, Jasmine Sandlas
Naal Nachna (Loosely based)	Dhurandhar	2025	Shashwat Sachdev	Afsana Khan, Reble

=== Language: Tamil ===
A few songs are composed in Raga Madhyamavathi, the Carnatic equivalent of Megh.

Song	Film	Composer	Singer
Muthukkalo Kangal	Nenjirukkum Varai	M. S. Viswanathan	T. M. Soundararajan, P. Susheela
Kana Kaanum	Agni Sakshi	M. S. Viswanathan	S. P. Balasubrahmanyam, Saritha
Aagaya Gangai	Dharma Yuddham	Ilayaraja	Malaysia Vasudevan, S. Janaki
Tholvi Nilayenna Ninaithal	Oomai Vizhigal	Manoj-Gyan	P B Sreenivas, Abavanan, Chorus
Velli Malarae	Jodi	A. R. Rahman	S. P. Balasubrahmanyam, Mahalakshmi Iyer
Oru Deivam Thantha Poove	Kannathil Muthamittal	A. R. Rahman	P. Jayachandran, Chinmayi
Thumbi Thullal(Abheri traces also)	Cobra	A. R. Rahman	Nakul Abhyankar, Shreya Ghoshal
Thom Karuvil Irunthom (Reused from "Dheem Ta Dare")	Star	A. R. Rahman	Shankar Mahadevan
Ennai Konja Konja	Aathi	Vidyasagar	Hariharan, Sujatha Mohan

== Important recordings ==
- Amir Khan, Ragas Megh and Lalit, His Master's Voice LP (long-playing record), EMI-EASD1331
- Pt Ajoy Chakraborty -Raag Megh (https://www.youtube.com/watch?v=Sg6LDWgv4Tc)
