= Malhar (family of ragas) =

Indian Classical Music

Malhar Ragang and all other ragas falling under this category are ragas in the Hindustani Classical music. Ragang refers to a family of ragas sharing a common melodic kernel. Other similar raga families are the Sarang family and the Kanada family. The Malhar ragas are generally sung in the rainy season. The word Malhar is associated with torrential rains.

The unique phrase that categorises the Malhar family from others is m (m)R (m)R P, this is the Malhar signature phrase.

== History ==
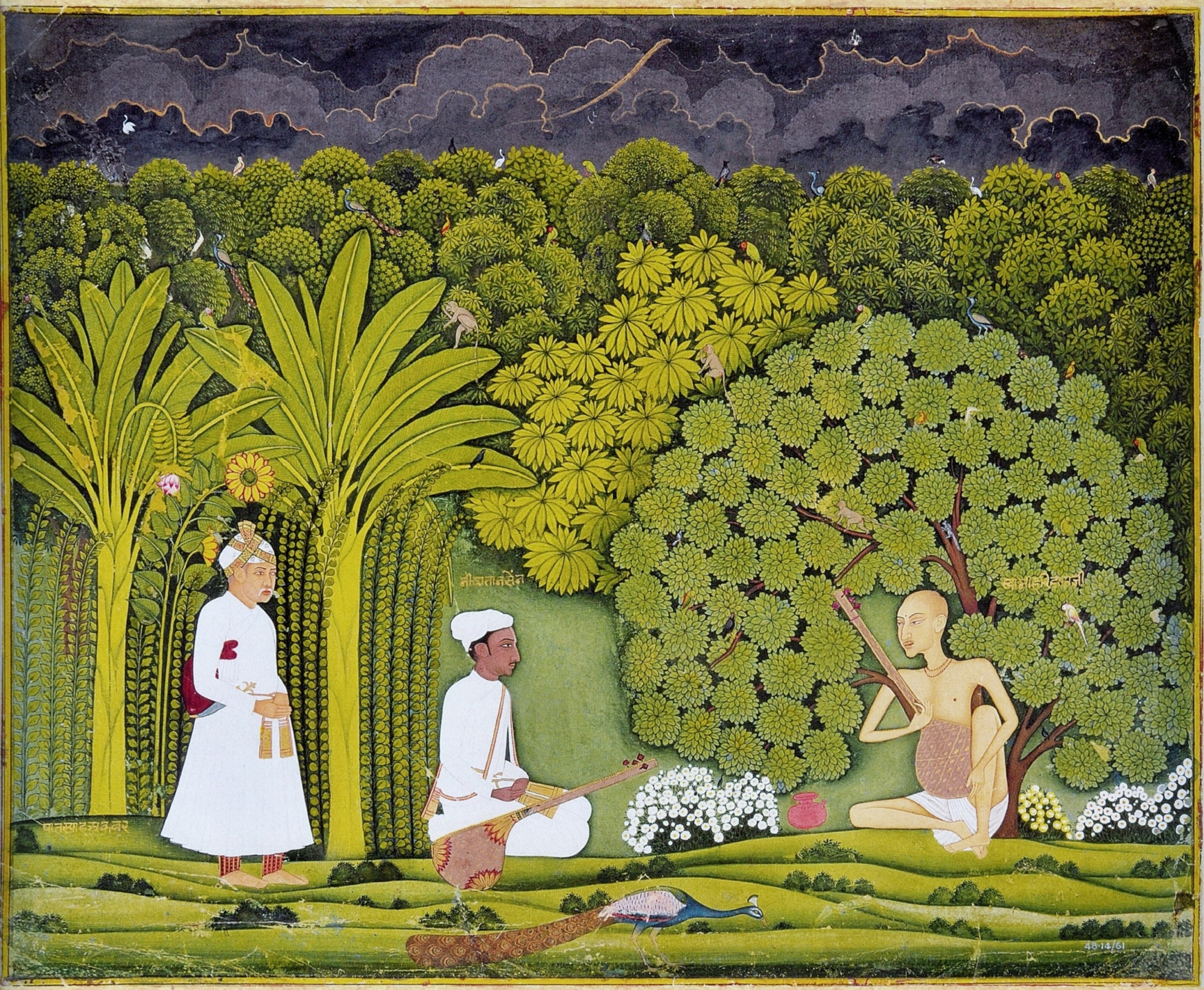
Miyan Tansen

According to legends, Malhar is so powerful that when sung, it can induce rainfall. Many written accounts describe the Raga Malhar. Tansen, Baiju Bawra, Baba Ramdas, Nayak Charju, Miyan Bakhshu, Tanta rang, Tantras Khan, Bilas Khan (son of Tansen), Hammer Sen, Surat Sen, and Meera Bai are some of those said to be capable of starting rains using various kinds of raga Malhar.

It is said that raga Miyan ki Malhar was created by Miyan Tansen.

== List of ragas in the Malhar family ==
Following is the list of the ragas in the Malhar Family :

- Adana Malhar
- Anand Malhar (first sung by GaanSaraswati Vidushi Kishori Amonkar)
- Arun Malhar
- Bahar Malhar
- Barwa Malhar
- Basanti Malhar (mixture of ragas Basant and Gaud Malhar)
- Bilawal Malhar (mixture of ragas Alhaiya Bilawal and Gaud Malhar)
- Birju ki Malhar
- Chandani Malhar
- Charju Ki Malhar
- Chhaya Malhar
- Desh Malhar
- Dhulia Malhar
- Gandhi Malhar (sung by Pandit Kumar Gandharva)
- Gaud Malhar
- Gaudgiri Malhar (sung by Pandit Jasraj)
- Jayant Malhar
- Jhinjhoti Malhar (sung by Dr. Sunita Saxena)
- Kafi Malhar
- Kedar Malhar/Savani Kedar (sung by Vidushi Ashwini Bhide-Deshpande)
- Tansen Ki Malhar/Miyan Ki Malhar
- Meerabai Ki Malhar
- Megh Malhar
- Mishra Mel ki Malhar (played by Ustad Bismillah Khan on the Shehnai)
- Mod Malhar (mixture of Kamod and Miyan Ki Malhar)
- Nanak Malhar
- Nat Malhar
- Pat Malhar
- Ramdasi Malhar
- Sarang Malhar/Miyan Ki Sarang
- Sawan Gandhar (sung by GaanSaraswati Vidushi Kishori Amonkar)
- Shahana Malhar
- Shiv Malhar (mixture of ragas Shivaranjani and Miyan Ki Malhar)
- Shuddha Malhar
- Sohan Malhar (mixture of ragas Sohni and Gaud Malhar)
- Sorath Malhar
- Sur Malhar
- Surdasi Malhar
- Tilak Malhar

== See also ==
- Malhar
- List of Ragas in Hindustani classical music
- Kanada (family of ragas)
- Sarang (family of ragas)
