= Mallar =

Mallar may refer to:

- Pallar, also known as Mallar, an agricultural community from Tamil Nadu, India
- Mallar, Karnataka, a census town in India
- Malhar, Chhattisgarh, a town in India
- Mallar (poet), Tamil poet, scholar, and commentator from medieval India
- Malhar, a rage in Indian classical music

== See also ==
- Malar (disambiguation)
- Malhar (disambiguation)
