= Nenjirukkum Varai =

Nenjirukkum Varai (lit. 'As Long as You Have Heart') may refer to these Indian Tamil-language films:

- Nenjirukkum Varai (1967 film), directed by C. V. Sridhar, starring Sivaji Ganesan and K. R. Vijaya
- Nenjirukkum Varai (2006 film), by S. A. Chandrasekhar, starring Narain and Deepa
