= Sarang (family of ragas) =

Sarang ragang Hindustani pronunciation: [ˈsärəŋg ˈrägäŋg] (ISO 15919/IAST: Sāraṅg rāgaṅg, Hindi and Marathi: सारंग रागांग, Bengali: সারং রাগাঙ্গ), and all other ragas falling under this category are ragas in the Hindustani Classical music. Ragang refers to a family of ragas, sharing a common melodic kernel. Other similar raga families are the Malhar family and the Kanada family. The Sarang ragas are sung in the time period of early afternoon. This includes many ragas originating from folk music and songs. The Sarang raga and all other ragas falling under in this type depict the scenes of the Indian historic past events, e.g. raga Brindabani Sarang depicting Vrindavan village or Lankadahan Sarang depicting Lord Hanuman singing this raga while burning Lanka with his tail, etc.

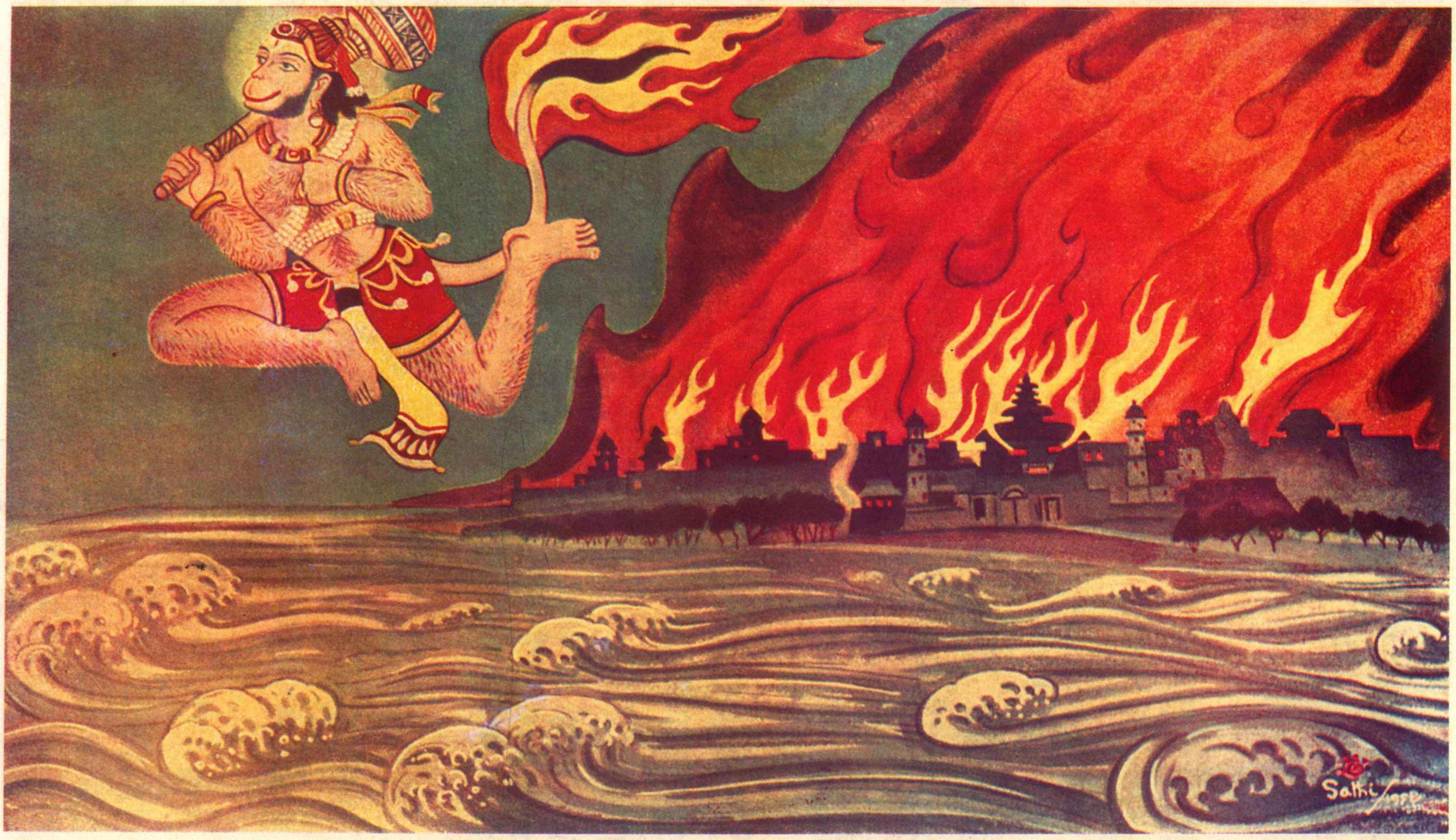
Ramayan depicts Hanuman setting fire to Lanka. Raga Lankādahan Sārang is named after this episode

== History ==
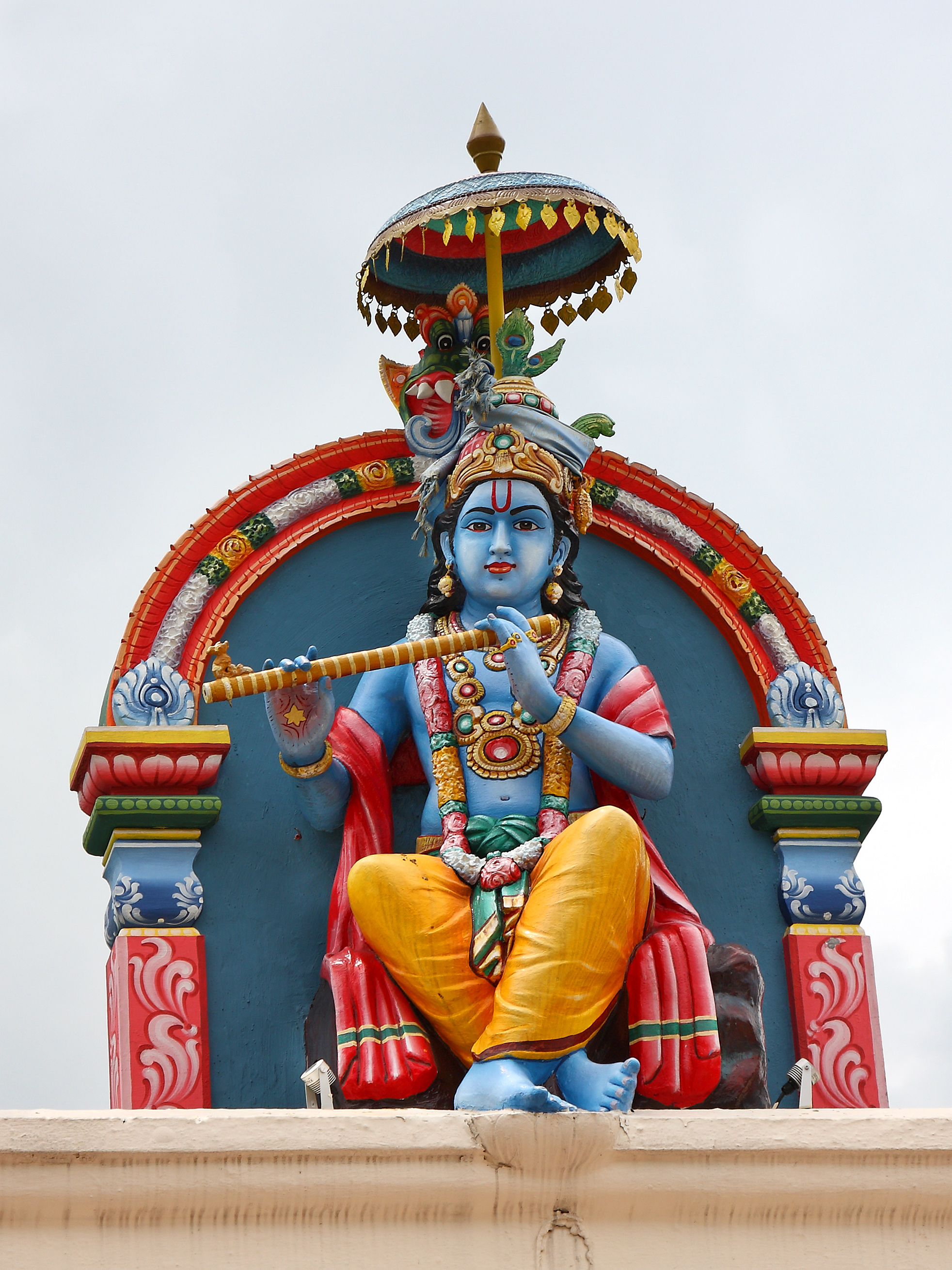
Krishna, shown holding an Indian flute. Traditional bandishes for ragas of the Sarang family are set to themes related to Krishna

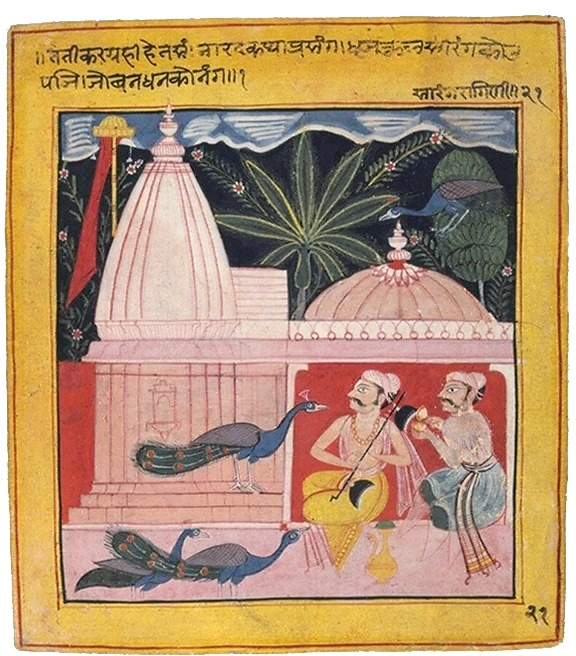
Sarang ragini, Ragamala, c. 1605

The main raga Sarang was created by Swami Haridas. The associated mythology being that he brought Lord Krishna to earth by singing this raga who took the form of an idol which can still be seen in Mathura. It may be so that raga Sarang is also called as Brindabani Sarang or Vridavani Sarang depicting that Lord Krishna being associated as Vrindavan as he lived there. Given its connection to Lord Krishna, it is a popular and sacred Raga in the religious genre Haveli Sangeet. This raga is sung mostly based on the Mathura region. The Gats and the Bandhish are based on the Braja Basha or the Braja language/dialect.

== List of ragas in the Sarang family ==
Following is the list of the ragas in the Sarang Family :

- Ambika Sarang
- Badhamsa Sarang / Badhans / Barhams Sarang
- Dhulia Sarang
- Gaud Sarang
- Hindoli Sarang
- Jayant Sarang
- Lankadahan Sarang (sometimes also called as Lankadahani Sarang.)
- Loor Sarang
- Madhumad/Madhmad Sarang
- Maru Sarang
- Miyan Ki Sarang
- Nat Sarang
- Noor Sarang (very Specially sung in Haveli sangeet)
- Salang
- Samant Sarang
- Saraswati Sarang
- Shuddha Sarang
- Shyam Sarang
- Sunand Sarang (Created by Pt. Milind Date)
- Tilaki Sarang (created by Subhasish Bhawal)
- Yashowati Sarang

== Detailed historical information about some ragas ==
1. Raga Sarang - The associated mythology of raga Sarang is that 'being that he (Swami Haridas) brought Lord Krishna to earth by singing this raga who took the form of an idol which can still be seen in Mathura. It may be so that Raga Sarang is also called as Brindabani Sarang or Vridavani Sarang depicting that Krishna being associated as Vrindavan as he lived there.'

2. Raga Lankadahan Sarang - Lankadahan Sarang (also known as Lankadahani Sarang) depicts Lord Hanuman singing this raga while burning Lanka with his tail. See Sundar Kand for more in-depth information. This raga is an offshoot of raga Vridanvani Sarang with adding a Komal Gandhar to raga Vridavani Sarang.

3. Raga Madhumad Sarang - The only difference between raga Brindabani Sarang and Madhumad Sarang is the Brindabani Sarang has both, the Komal and the Shuddha Nishad (Ni) but Madhumad Sarang has only the Komal Nishad.

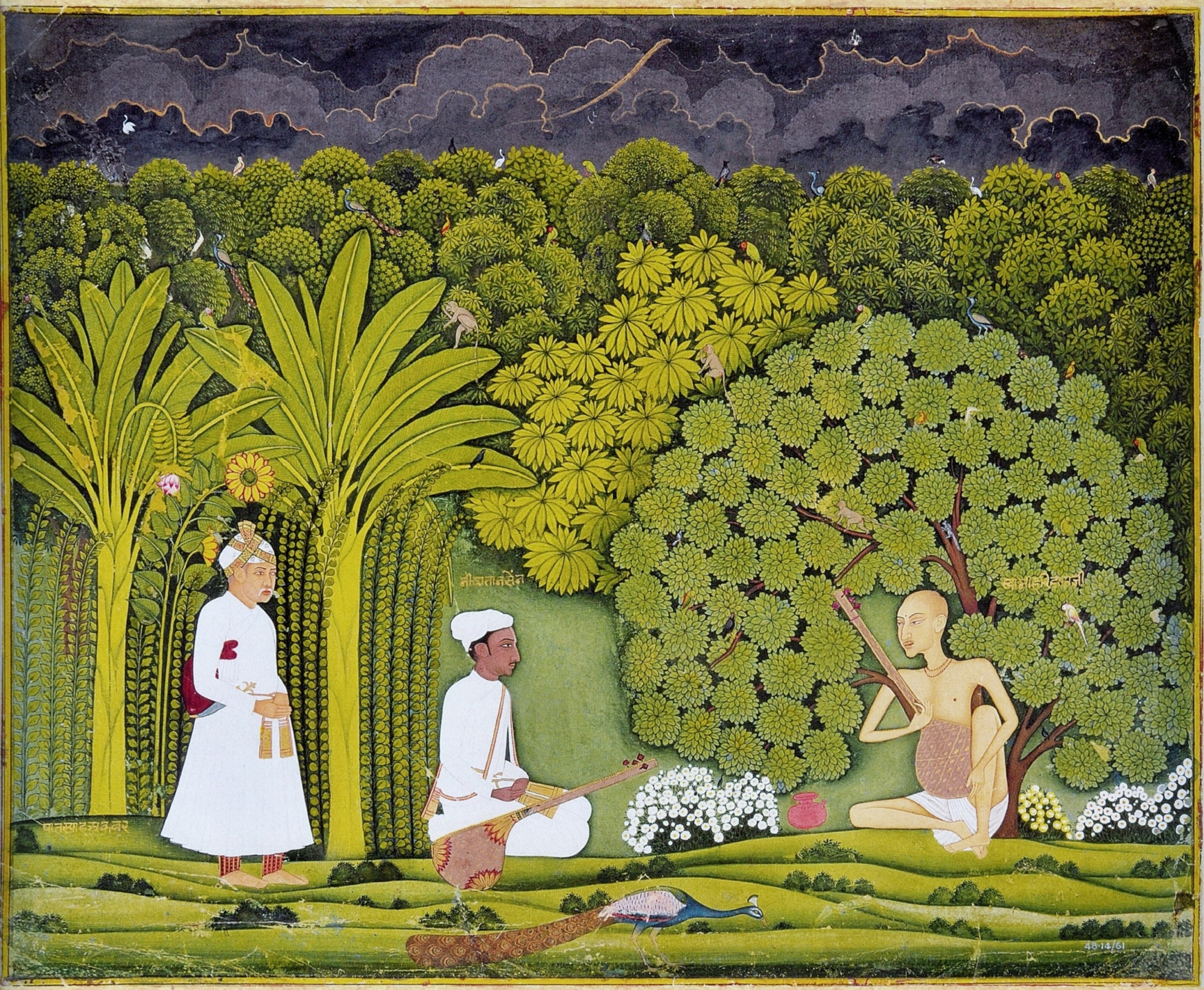
Miyan Tansen

4. Raga Miyan ki Sarang - Miyan ki Sarang is the mixture of raga Miyan Malhar and raga Vridavani Sarang. This raga was made by Miyan Tansen and so called as Miyan Ki Sarang. This raga obtains by eliminating Komal Gandhar (Ga) from Miyan Malhar and by advancing the Sarang Raganga.

5. Raga Saraswati Sarang - Saraswati Sarang is simply a mixture of ragas, Saraswati and Sarang.

6. Raga Kauns Sarang - Kauns Sarang is just a mixture of ragas, Malkauns and Sarang.

7. Raga Maru Sarang - Maru Sarang is a mixture of ragas, Maru (Putra raga) and Sarang.

8. Raga Shuddha Sarang - This is probably the most popular Sarang prakar. It employs both shuddha and teevra madhyam.

9. Raga Samant Sarang - The approach to Shuddha Dhaivat and its assimilation in vakra aang is the main theme in raga Samant Sarang.

10. Raga Salang - This audav jati Sarang prakar is in a sense the obverse of Madhmad. That is, the komal nishad in the Madhmad contour is replaced by its shuddha counterpart here. This makes it somewhat tan-unfriendly.

11. Raga Ambika Sarang - This raga was designed by Chidanand Nagarkar. The gandhar is varjya, and elements of Shuddha Sarang and Kafi are blended together. There are occasional reminders of Raga Saraswati but the presence of shuddha nishad and shuddha madhyam make for a clear separation.

12. Raga Jayant Sarang - Raga Jayant Sarang is a mixture of ragas Jaijaiwanti and Brindabani Sarang.

13. Raga Nat Sarang - It is derived by a mixture of 2 ragas, Chhayanat and Brindabani Sarang.

14. Raga Tilaki Sarang is created by Sri Subhasish Bhawal. This raga is combined with Raga Brindavani Sarang, Sudh Sarang, Kafi, Ambika and Tilak Kamod. Swara: S R G M m P D n N S'.

== Sources ==
- The Sarang Family
- Google Groups
- Raagabase - A collection of Indian Classical Music Raags (a.k.a. Ragas)
- Shuddh sarang
- This sultry summer, make your afternoons dreamy with raag Saarang

== Also see ==
- Brindabani Sarang
- List of Ragas in Hindustani classical music
- Kanada (family of ragas)
- Malhar (family of ragas)
