= Brindavani Sarang =

Hindustani raga

Vrindavani Sarang
- Thaat: Kafi
- Time of day: Early afternoon, 12–3 Day Third Prahar
- Season: Summer
- Pakad: Ni Sa Re Ma Re Pa Ma Re Ni Sa
- Vadi: Re
- Samavadi: Pa
- Equivalent: Brindavani (Carnatic)
- Similar: Megh and Madhumad sarang (komal ni)

Brindaavani Sarang or Brindaabani Sarang, also known as raga Sarang, is a Hindustani classical raga. It is also called Vridaavani Sarang. This raga falls under the category of Sarang ragas.

== Theory ==
Brindabani Sarang is a Kafi thaat raga. It was created by Swami Haridas. The associated mythology being that he brought Lord Krishna to earth by singing this raga who took the form of an idol which can still be seen in Mathura. One of the famous Ragas for the Sarang raagang, it is a popular raag of this family, together with Shuddha Sarang, and Madhyamad Sarang. The name Brindavani Sarang is a testament to its popularity in the region around Mathura.

The notes Ga and Dha are not used in this raga. A characteristic of all Sarang is the way Rishab (Re) is sung. The Rishabh is not accorded embellishments, so it is sung without any meenḍ of adjacent swaras neither with any andolan. This preeminence of Re makes the swar the vadi of this Raga as also for all other varieties of this family (raagang).

Another dominant phrase is Sa - Ni - Pa, also used in many other ragas, notably the popular Kanhada family. The distinguishing factor being that the Ni in Kanhada's S-N-P takes a kaṇ of the Pa (of uttarang), with a ghaseeṭa effect, whereas the Ni of Sa-Ni-Pa in Sarang is rendered pure.

Brindavani Sarang's classification in thaat Kaafi is peculiar as it uses the shuddha form of "Ni" in its Aaroha, whereas the komala form of "ni" and "ga" is the main characteristic of the Kaafi thaat. So it is possible to make a mistake in identifying its thaat as Khamaj.

This raga evokes the sringara rasa - romantic love.

=== Aroha and Avaroha ===
Arohana: N S R M P N S'

Avarohana: S' n P M R S N S

Ni svara is Shuddha in Arohana and Komal in Avarohana.

=== Vadi and Samavadi ===
Vadi: Rishabha (re)

Samavadi: Panchama (pa)

=== Pakad or Chalan ===
Ni Sa Re Ma Re Pa Ma Re Ni Sa

R M P n - PMR, M- R N S R-S

=== Organisation and relationships ===
Thaat: Kafi Thaat

=== Gaayan Samay (Time of Singing) ===
Madhyanah (noon), Afternoon.

It is generally sung as Rajasthani folksongs.

=== Seasonality ===
It is generally regarded as a raga of summer season.

=== Rasa ===
Shringar Rasa: The emotion of love, including spiritual love

Veer Rasa: The Rasa of Valour

=== Related Raga ===
Madhumad Sarang has the Shuddha Ni dropped or Varjit (excluded). It is still considered a chanchal raga. Megh malhar has same notes but it is Dhrupad anga raga and is serious in rendering, with a lot of meenḍ. Another distinguishing factor is that while Rishabh is used extensively in Megh Malhar (as also in Sarang), the Rishabh there takes a very strong meenḍ from Madhyam (Me), a salient in the singing of meenḍ-heavy Megh.

== Carnatic compositions ==
- Kamalaptakula by Tyagaraja
- Soundararaajam Asharaye, Swaminathena Samrakshitoham and Rangapura Vihara by Muthuswami Deekshithar
- Aathma Nivedanam by Thulasivanam
- Eke Mamathe Kottu by Gopala Dasa in Kannada
- Arige Vadhuvade and Aada Pogona Baaro by Purandara Dasa
- Ranga Banda Brindavanadalli by Vyasatirtha in Kannada
- Ananda Mayage By Vadiraja Tirtha
- Yentha Mathramu, Kanti Akhilanda by Annamacharya
- Iko Node Ranganathana By Sripadaraja
- Amburuhânanâ by Kalyani Varadarajan
- Kaliyuga Varadhan by Periyasami Thooran
- Venkatesha Natham by Gowrishankar Stapati
- Thillana in Brindavani by M. Balamuralikrishna
- Thillana in Brindavani by Lalgudi Jayaraman
- Thillana in Brindavani by P. K. Rajagopala Iyer

== Film songs ==
Kannada:

- "Swami Devane Loka Palane (School Master)"
- "Kamalada Mogadole Kamalada Kannole (Hosa Itihaasa)"
- "Aatavenu Notavenu (Vasanta Geeta)"
- "Maduve Gandidu Nodamma (Addadaari)"
- "Pandharapuravemba Dodda Nagara (Dasara Pada)"
- "Pata Pata Gaali Pata (Aapta Mitra)"
- "Eesha Ninna Carana Bhajane Aase Inda (Bhajane)"
- "Kaashi Inda Bandanilli Vishvanaatha (Bhakti Geete)"
- "Yaava Shilpi Kanda Kanaso Neenu (Janma Janmada Anubandha)"
- "Barede Neenu Ninna Hesara (Seetha)"
- "Elli Ninna Bhaktaro Alle Mantralaya (Bhakti Geete)"
- "Kempadavo Ella Kempadavo (Ellindalo Bandavaru)"
- "Jagadisha Mallesha Sarvesha Goureesha (Baduku Bangaravayitu)"
- "Cheluvayya Cheluvo Taani Tandaana (Jaanapada)"
- "Kudurena Thandivni (Jaanapada)"
- "Kodagana Koli Nungitta (Tatva Pada)"
- "Kalita Hudugi Kudure Nadigi (Jaanapada)"
- "Nammoora Mandara Hoove (Aalemane)"
- "Adavi Deviya Kaadu Janagala (Rayaru Bandaru Mavana Manege)"
- "Hrudayave Ninna Hesarige (Belli Modagalu)"
- "Suvvi Suvvi Suvaalamma (Svatimuttu)"
- "Attitta Nodadiru (Bhavageete)"
- "Shivanu Bhikshakke Banda (Folk)"
- "Mutta Mutta Chinaari Mutta (Chinnaari Mutta)"
- "Bhaagyada Balegaara (Folk)"
- "Munisu Tarave Mugude (Bhaavageete)"
- "Harivaraasanam (Bhakti Geete)"
- "Esthu Saahasavanta Neene Balavanta (Bhakti Geete)"
- "Daasanaanu Visheshanaagu (Dasa Pada)"
- "Indu Shukravaara Shubhava Taruva Vaara (Bhakti Geete)"
- "Vaara Bantamma (Bhakti Geete)"
- "Bhaagyada Lakshmi Baaramma (Dasa Pada)"
- "Sadaa Kannale Olavina (Kaviratna Kaalidaasa)"
- "Beladingalaagi Baa (Mishra, Huliyahalina Mevu)"

=== Tamil language ===
Song	Movie	Composer	Singer
Pon Ondru Kanden	Padithal Mattum Podhuma	Viswanathan–Ramamoorthy	T. M. Soundararajan, P. B. Sreenivas
Poo Varaiyum	Idhayathil Nee	Viswanathan–Ramamoorthy	P. B. Sreenivas
Thangamagal Vayatril	Vaazhkai Padagu	Viswanathan–Ramamoorthy	P. Susheela
En Aasaiyum Unnodu	Thirudan	Viswanathan–Ramamoorthy	P. Susheela
Thangachi Chinna Ponnu	Karuppu Panam	Viswanathan–Ramamoorthy	Sirkazhi Govindarajan, L. R. Eswari
Nathaswara Osaiyile Devan	Poovum Pottum	R. Govarthanam	T. M. Soundararajan, P. Susheela
Pudhiyadhor Ulagam Seivom	Chandhrodhayam	M. S. Viswanathan	Sirkazhi Govindarajan
"Kamban Emandhaan"	Nizhal Nijamagiradhu	M. S. Viswanathan	S. P. Balasubrahmanyam
Nee Punniyam Seithaval	Punniyam Seithaval	M. S. Viswanathan	Vani Jairam
Sonnalthane Theriyum	Ranuva Veeran	M. S. Viswanathan	S. P. Balasubrahmanyam, S. P. Sailaja
Bhoomi Neranjuruku	Meendum Pallavi	M. S. Viswanathan	P. Susheela
Chinnakkannane	Polladhavan	M. S. Viswanathan	P. Susheela
Manathil Ore Oru	En Purushanthaan Enakku Mattumthaan	Ilaiyaraaja	P. Susheela
Methuva Thanthi	Thalattu	Ilaiyaraaja	Mano, Minmini
Kallukkulle Vandha Eeram Enna	Manithanin Marupakkam	Ilaiyaraaja	S. P. Balasubrahmanyam, S. Janaki
Mannaiyam Ponnaiyum	Nadodi Pattukkaran	Ilaiyaraaja	S. P. Balasubrahmanyam, S. Janaki
Poongatre Thendathey	Kunguma Chimil	Ilaiyaraaja	S. Janaki
Muthamma Muthamma	Thanthu Vitten Ennai	Ilaiyaraaja	Arunmozhi, Uma Ramanan
Oru Pokiri Raathiri	Idhu Namma Bhoomi	Ilaiyaraaja	Mano, Swarnalatha
Jilla Mulukka	Priyanka	Ilaiyaraaja	Mano, K. S. Chithra
Kaveri Aaru	Themmangu Paattukaaran	Ilaiyaraaja	Mano, K. S. Chithra
Maadethile Kanni	Veera	Ilaiyaraaja	S. P. Balasubrahmanyam, Swarnalatha
Maalaigal Idam	December Pookal	Ilaiyaraaja	K.J. Yesudas, K.S. Chitra
Ravivarman	Vasanthi	Chandrabose	K.J. Yesudas, K.S. Chitra
Ilayavale	Chinna Chinna Aasaigal	Chandrabose	K.S. Chitra
Maragatha Vallikku Manakkolam	Anbulla Appa	Shankar–Ganesh	K.J. Yesudas
Chandiranai Thottathu Yaar	Ratchagan	A. R. Rahman	Hariharan, Sujatha Mohan
Konjum Mainakkale	Kandukondain Kandukondain	A. R. Rahman	Sadhana Sargam
Radhai Manathil	Snegithiye	Vidyasagar	K. S. Chithra, Sujatha Mohan, Sangeetha Sajith
Kandaen Kandaen	Madhurey	Vidyasagar	Madhu Balakrishnan, Sadhana Sargam
Ennai Konja Konja(Raga Malhar touches)	Aathi	Vidyasagar	Hariharan, Sujatha Mohan
Naan Varaindhu Vaitha	Jayamkondaan	Vidyasagar	Hariharan, Madhushree
Chella Namm Veettukku	Poovellam Un Vaasam	Vidyasagar	Malaysia Vasudevan, Sujatha Mohan, Harish Raghavendra, Sangeetha Sajith
Poongatre Thinamum Theduren	Thangarasu	Deva	S. P. Balasubrahmanyam, K.S. Chitra
Aathangarai Thoppukulla	Rayilukku Neramachu	S. A. Rajkumar	Malaysia Vasudevan, S. P. Sailaja
Aantha Avasthai	February 14	Bharadwaj	Shreya Ghoshal
Aanandha Yaazhai	Thanga Meenkal	Yuvan Shankar Raja	Sriram Parthasarathy
Thendral Thendral	Raasi	Sirpy	P. Unnikrishnan, K. S. Chithra
Malligaipoo Alagil	Annai Vayal	Sirpy	S. P. Balasubrahmanyam, S. Janaki
Kadhalmazhai Vanthu Adikuthu	Nesi	Sirpy	Balram, Sujatha Mohan
Pillai Thamarai	Album	Karthik Raja	Madhu Balakrishnan
Ghoomar	Padmavati	Sanjay Leela Bhansali	Shreya Ghoshal, Divya Kumar
Nenjorathil	Pichaikkaran	Vijay Antony	Deepak Doddera, Supriya Joshi
Pen Maegam Polavae	Kathai Thiraikathai Vasanam Iyakkam	Sharreth	G. V. Prakash Kumar, Saindhavi
Theeranadhi	Maara	Ghibran	Padmalatha

Song	Movie	Composer	Singers
Ghata Ghanaghor Ghor	Tansen (film)	Khemchand Prakash	Khursheed Bano
Aaja Bhanvara Suni Dagar	Rani Roopmati(1959)	S. N. Tripathi	Lata Mangeshkar
Jhananana Jhan Baje Payaliya	Rani Roopmati(1959)	S. N. Tripathi	Lata Mangeshkar & Mohammed Rafi
Tum Sang Akhiyan Milake	Sunehre Din	Gyan Dutt	Surinder Kaur
Kaare Kaare Badara	Bhabhi (1957 film)	Chitragupt (composer)	Lata Mangeshkar
Saavan Aye Ya Na Aye	Dil Diya Dard Liya	Naushad	Mohammed Rafi & Asha Bhosle
Pyar Hamara Munna	Sansar(1951 film)	Emani Sankara Sastry & M. D. Parthasarathy & B.S. Kalla	Lata Mangeshkar
Mana Bhavana Sawan Aya	Chandralekha (1948 film)	S. Rajeswara Rao	Tun Tun
Jaadugar Sainyan	Nagin (1954 film)	Hemant Kumar	Lata Mangeshkar
Meri Jaan Balle Balle	Kashmir Ki Kali	O. P. Nayyar	Mohammed Rafi & Asha Bhosle
Jhuthi Muthi Mitwa Avan Bole	Rudaali	Bhupen Hazarika	Lata Mangeshkar
Jhuthi Muthi Mitwa Avan Bole	Rudaali	Bhupen Hazarika	Lata Mangeshkar

Song	Movie	Composer	Singers
Chupulu Kalasina Shubha Vela	Mayabazaar	Ghantasala	Ghantasala & P. Leela
O Priyurala	Chakrapani (film)	P. Bhanumathi	A. M. Rajah
Idi naa priya nartana vela	Mayuri (film)	S. P. Balasubrahmanyam	S. Janaki

=== Hindi language ===
Song	Movie	Composer	Lyricist	Singer
Ghoomar Ghoomar	Padmaavat	Sanjay Leela Bhansai	A M Turaz	Shreya Ghoshal

=== Malayalam language ===
Song	Movie	Composer	Singer
Oru Narupushpamayi	Meghamalhar	Ramesh Narayan	Yesudas
Mazhayil Rathri Mazhayil	Karutha Pakshikal	Mohan Sithara	Manjari
Kaathodu kaathoram	Kathodu Kathoram	Bharathan	lathika
Karale nin kai pidichal	Devadoothan	Vidyasagar	K. J. Yesudas, P. V. Preetha
Vaanam chayum	Anarkali (2015 film)	Vidyasagar	K. S. Harisankar
Maampulli kavil	Katha Parayumpol	M. Jayachandran	Vineeth Sreenivasan, Shweta Mohan
Adhyamay kandanal	Thooval Kottaram	Johnson (composer)	K. J. Yesudas, k. S. Chitra

=== Telugu language ===
Song	Movie	Composer	Singer
Sisiraniki Vasantharagam	Lakshmi’s NTR	Kalyani Malik	Kalyani Malik & Chinmayi Sripada

=== Other songs ===
Song	Language	Album	Composer	Lyricist	Singer	Audio Label
Dhimi Dhimi	Telugu	Kaiwara Yogi	Mahesh Mahadev	Yogi Nareyana	Priyadarshini, S. P. Balasubrahmanyam, Mahesh Mahadev	PM Audios
Navarathriya Ee	Kannada	Navarthriya Navavaibhava	Bharadwaj	Mahesh Mahadev	Priyadarshini, Mahesh Mahadev	PM Audios
Namma Kannada Rajyotsava	Kannada	Namma Kannada Rajyotsava	Mahesh Mahadev	Mahesh Mahadev	Priyadarshini, Mahesh Mahadev	
Dhara Hogi	Hindi	Bandish Bandits	Shankar Ehsaan Loy	Sameer Samant	Shankar Mahadevan	Sony Music / Amazon Sellers Pvt. Ltd.
Vinai Theerkum Nayagane	Tamil	Aiyan Irandu Pon Pathangale Saranam	M Easwar	M Easwar	K.J. Yesudas	Tharangini
