= Darbari Kanada =

Janya raga of Carnatic music

- Thaat: Asavari
- Time of day: Midnight
- Arohana: S R (M)g, M P (n)d n S'
- Avarohana: S' (n)d n P M P (M)g, M R S
- Vadi: R
- Samavadi: P
- Synonym: Durbari
- Similar: Kaunsi Kanada; Adana

Darbari Kanada, or simply Raga Darbari (pronounced darbāri kānada), is a raga in Carnatic/Hindustani music. It is a janya ragam (derived scale) of 20th Melakarta raga Natabhairavi. It is believed to be borrowed into Hindustani classical music by Miyan Tansen, the famous 16th-century composer in the Mughal emperor Akbar's court from the original Kanada raga from Carnatic Music. It belongs to the Kanada family. It is believed that the Mughal emperor Akbar was very fond of this raaga. Hence often made Miyan Tansen sing this raaga in his court. This is reflected in the name itself; Darbar is the Persian derived word in Hindi meaning "court." As the most familiar raga in the Kanada family, it may sometimes also be called Shuddha Kanada or pure Kanada. It belongs to the Asavari thaat. This raag is called raaga Kaanada in Yakshagana Karnataka state dance. It is also sometimes written as Durbari and Durbarikanada.

== In Hindustani classical music ==
In Hindustani music, Darbari follows almost its original style of singing from the Carnatic music. It is a grave raga, played deep into the night, considered to be one of the more difficult to master, and with the potential for profound emotional impact.

Darbari is a very serious raga and hence, slow and elaborate meend and andolan are generally more preferred than light and frivolous ornamentations like murki or khatka. The improvisation of Darbari is done more in the mandra saptak, or lower octave. The ascension of arohana is in the lower and middle octaves. In the avarohana the note Ga (gandhar) komal is used in a slow vibrato (andolan) on this note. Similarly, komal Dha is also used by Andolan. The Andolan of komal Ga and komal Dha add to the gravity of the raga. The association of the notes Ni and Pa sounds pleasing. Its Vadi swara is Re and Samavadi is Pa.

arohana: S R (R)g, (R)g M P d n S'

avarohana: S' d n P M P (M)g, (M)g M (S)R, S

For reference, the set of notes in the Asavari thaat is S R g M P d n, and for Darbari, the role of the komal gandhar is crucial, as is dwelling on the lower komal dhaivat for some time. Other ragas in the Kanada family include Abhogi Kanada, Shahana Kanada, and Adana (Adana is part of the Kanada Raga group).

== In Carnatic music ==
It is an ubhaya vakra sampurna rāgam derived from the 20th melakarta rāgam Natabhairavi. It is an extremely melodious raga. It can create extreme and unparalleled emotional impact. It is said to evoke feeling of sadness, longing and romance to listeners. Its ārohaṇa-avarohaṇa structure is as follows (see swaras in Carnatic music for details on the notations used):

- ārohaṇa : S R₂ G₂ S M₁ P D₁ N₂ Ṡ (Note: Alternate notations: Hindustani: S R G̱ S M P Ḏ Ṉ Ṡ; Western: C D E♭ C F G A♭ B♭ C)
- avarohaṇa : Ṡ D₁ N₂ P M₁ P G₂ R₂ S (Note: Alternate notations: Hindustani: Ṡ Ḏ Ṉ P M P G̱ R S; Western: C A♭ B♭ G F G E♭ D C)

This scale uses the notes chatusruti rishabham, sadharana gandharam, shuddha madhyamam, shuddha dhaivatham, kaisiki nishadham.

== See also ==
- List of Film Songs based on Ragas
