= Tana and Riri =

Gujarati folktale

Tana and Riri is an Indian story about two girls born around 1564, who were asked to sing in the court of Akbar. The story has become part of Gujarati folk culture.

The twins were from a northern town known as Vadnagar near Visnagar in the state of Gujarat. Tana and Riri both girls are closely related to Narsinh Mehta. Narsinh Mehta's grand daughter is Sharmishtha who is mother of Tana and Riri.

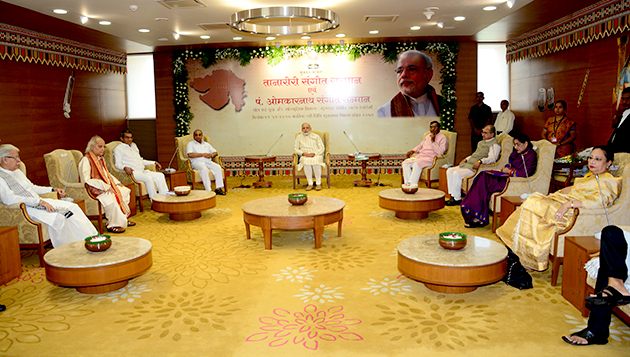
Narendra Modi presents Tana-Riri and Pandit Omkarnath Sangeet Awards

== The legend ==
When Akbar's court singer, maestro Tansen's preceptor died, he sang the raag "Deepak". The effect of singing this raag is said to be that the singer starts feeling an incurable heat in his/her body. When Tansen was affected by the burns of the Deepak raag, he roamed around the whole of India. Finally the commander in chief of their army, Amjadkhan, came to Vadnagar and learned of the two sisters Tana and Riri who were proficient singers and could cure Tansen (expert of raag dipak) by singing raga Malhar. When they were asked to sing at Akbar's court, they refused to come since it was their vow as Nagars only to sing in front of the village deity's idol. So they asked Tansen instead to come to their home if he would want to subside the effect of raag deepak; which he agreed to. Women did not leave their houses and go elsewhere in those days. Thus these twin sisters became renowned as the only singers who were able to cure Tansen in whole India. Later on king Akbar invited them to become his court singers but they refused as they would only sing in front of God and not any king. So after one or more requests Akbar sent army to fetch them. Instead they killed themselves by drowning in a well. They chose to do this rather than to refuse, which would have caused conflict in their town. When Akbar learned of it he apologised to their father and asked Tansen to develop a new genre of pieces named in honor of Tana-Riri.

== Legacy ==
A memorial has been erected in Vadnagar to honour Tana-Riri.

Tana-Riri Music Festival is organised every year by Government of Gujarat in their dedication.
