= Malhar Kendurkar =

Canadian astrophysicist

Malhar R. Kendurkar
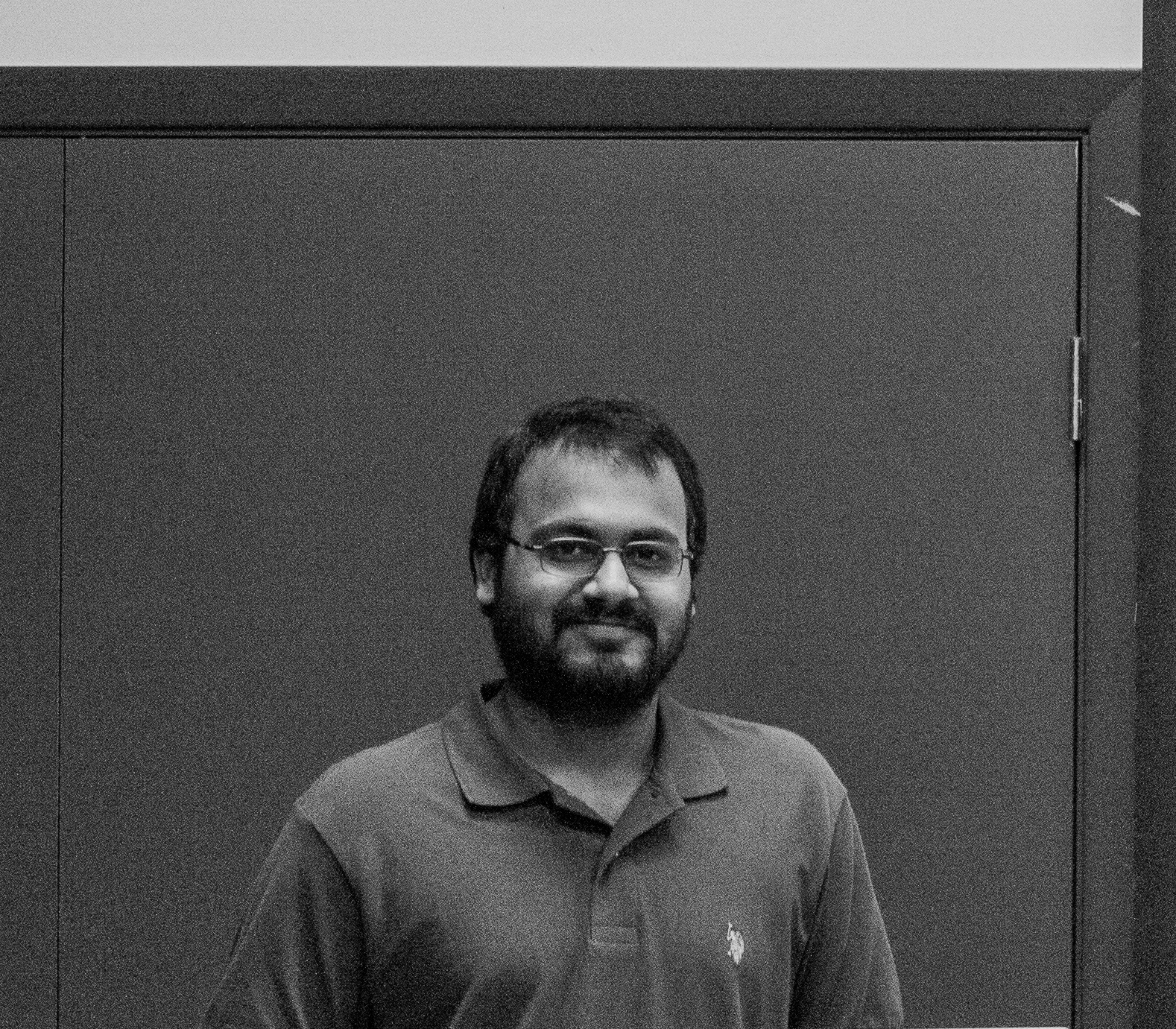
- Born: 7 December 1994 (age 30)
- Years active: 2014–present
- Known for: Time Domain Astronomy

Malhar R. Kendurkar is an observational astronomer based in Prince George, BC, Canada. His main research focus is on astronomical sky surveys, transient astrophysics and spectroscopy. Kendurkar is well known for searching and studying supernovae including nuclear transients and novae in the Andromeda Galaxy.

He is credited with the discoveries of more than 170 transients since 2018. In 2018, to advance the research, he formed an international team of astronomers, the Global Supernovae Search Team (GSNST). The core team members are from Canada, France, India, and the US. GSNST is the first sky survey in Canada dedicated to searching for astronomical transients. Kendurkar is also a guest investigator at the Dominion Astrophysical Observatory of the National Research Council of Canada and uses 1.82 m Plaskett Telescope for the sky survey.

Currently, Malhar is the President of Prince George Astronomical Observatory, a past Director for 4 years, a former National Director of the Royal Astronomical Society of Canada and a Principal investigator of the Global Supernova Search Team (GSNST). Malhar is also a sessional professor of astronomy at Canadore College.

Kendurkar is featured on several British Columbia and Canadian media outlets discussing his research and promoting astronomy.

Asteroid 541801 Kendurkar (2011 YY65) has been named in honour of Malhar Kendurkar, for his contributions to astronomy and astrophysics—particularly in the areas of astronomical sky surveys, transient astrophysics, and spectroscopy by David D. Balam.
