= Kanada (family of ragas) =

Group of ragas in Hindustani classical music

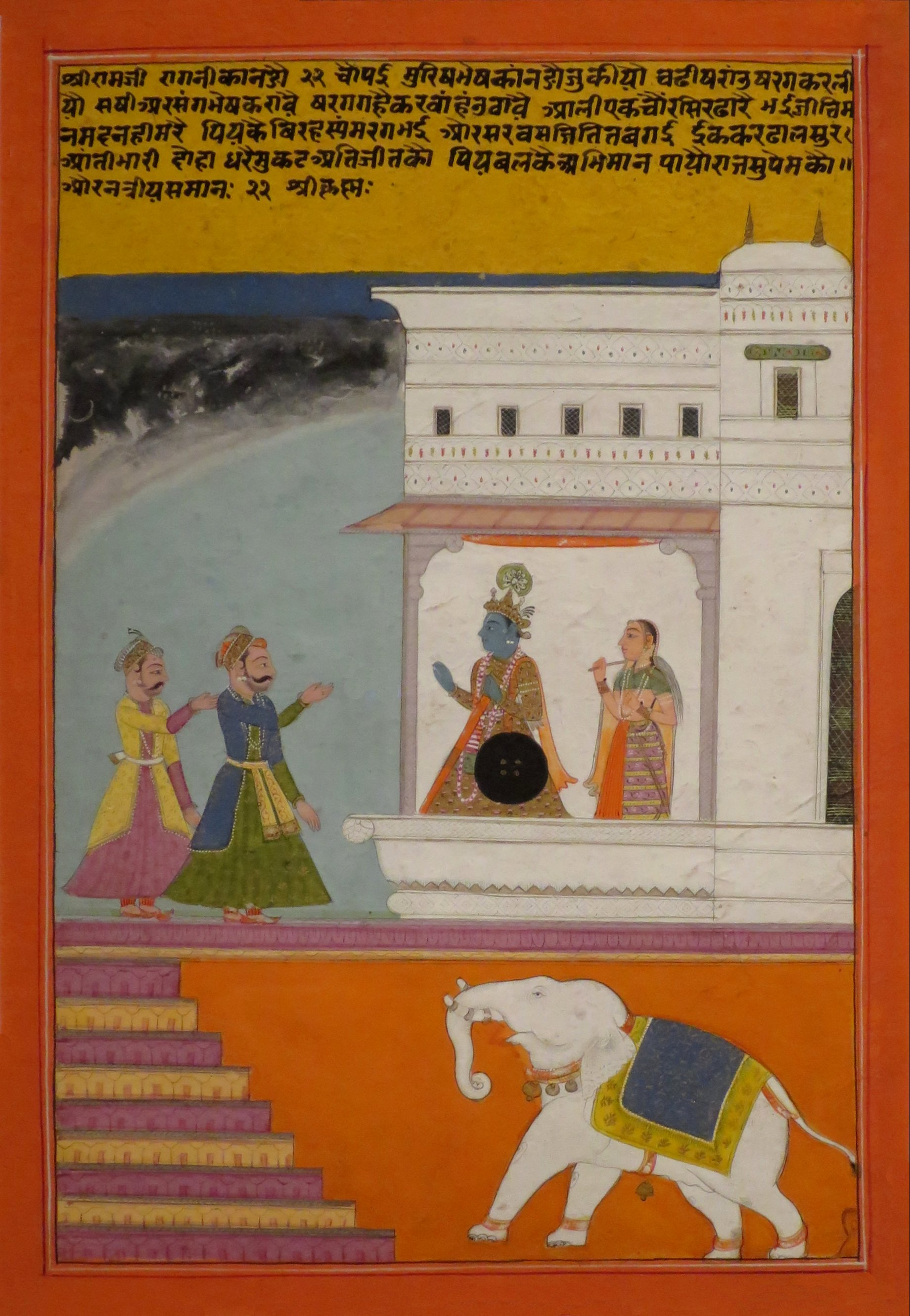
Kanada Ragini of the Dipak Raga by Chetan Das, 1746, Honolulu Museum of Art

Kanada (Hindustani pronunciation: [ˈkänəɽä ˈrägäŋg], (ISO 15919/IAST: Kānaṛā rāgaṅg Hindi: कान्हड़ा,Tamil: கானடா, Kannada: ಕಾನಡ, Bengali: কানাড়া (IPA: ka.na.ɽa))) also known as '''Kanhada''' is a group of ragas in Indian classical music. They are all derived from the Carnatic music raga Kanada. This raga was adapted into Hindustani Music from Carnatic Music. Some scholars suggest that all the ragas in the Kanada family are derived from individual aspects of Kanada. Shudda Kanada/Darbari Kanada is one of the most familiar ragas in the family and is considered to have the highest romantic, melancholy and longing aspect of Kanada in it. Other similar raga families are the Malhar family and the Sarang family.

Ragas in this) group belong to different thaats, but particularly to the Asavari or Kafi thaat.
Sadharana/Komal Gandhar (Ga) and Chaturshruti/Shudda/Komal Dhaivat (Dha) are vakra (zigzag) in descent and are used in phrases like gMR and dnP.

== List of ragas in the Kanada family ==
The following ragas belong to this group :

1. Abhogi Kanada
2. Adana Kanada
3. Asavari Kanada
4. Basanti Kanada
5. Bageshree Kanada
6. Bhavsakh Kanada
7. Chandramukhi Kanada
8. Darbari Kanada
9. Enayatkhani Kanada
10. Devsakh Kanada
11. Gunji Kanada
12. Husseini Kanada
13. Jayant Kanada
14. Kafi Kanada
15. Kausi Kanada
16. Lachari Kanada
17. Lankashree Kanada
18. Malkauns Kanada
19. Nagadhwani Kanada
20. Navarasa Kanada
21. Nayaki Kanada
22. Rageshree Kanada
23. Raisa Kanada
24. Ramsakh Kanada
25. Revati Kanada (blend of ragas Desi and Shahana Kanada)
26. Shahana Kanada
27. Sughrai Kanada
28. Suha Kanada

== See also ==
- List of Film Songs based on Ragas
- Sarang ragas
- Malhar family

== Literature ==
- Bor, Joep (c. 1997), The Raga Guide, Charlottesville, Virginia: Nimbus Records, archived from the original on 3 December 2003
- Kaufmann, Walter (1968), The ragas of North India, Calcutta, New Dheli, Bombay: Oxford & IBH Publishing Company
