= Malar, Pakistan =

Town in Balochistan, Pakistan

Coordinates: 26°19′48″N 64°55′10″E

Malar is a town in the Awaran District of Balochistan province, Pakistan. It is located at 26°19'48N 64°55'10E and has an altitude of 548 metres (1801 feet). Malar is an underdeveloped town of Pakistan. Malar has a huge land with little population. The town was ruled by Mirwani Tribe in the Past. Mirwani tribe is still the leading tribe of Malar.
