= Madhyamavati =

Janya raga of Carnatic music

- Arohanam: S R2 M1 P N2 S
- Avarohanam: S N2 P M1 R2 S

Madhyamavati (madhyamāvati) is a raga in Carnatic music (musical scale of South Indian classical music). It is an audava rāga (or owdava rāga, meaning pentatonic scale), as it does not have all the seven musical notes (swaras). It is a janya rāga (derived scale). The equivalent of Madhyamavati in Hindustani music is Madhumad Sarang. It also has other equivalents in Hindustani music such as ragas Megh and Megh Malhar.

It is considered a very auspicious rāgam and every Carnatic music concert ends with either a song in Madhyamavati or the ending of the last song is sung in this rāgam. It is very suitable for elaboration and exploration due to even spacing of notes. The scale uses the first three notes of the cycle of fifths S, P and R2 and fourths S, M1 and N2.

== Structure and Lakshana ==
Madhyamavati is a symmetric rāga that does not contain gāndhāram or dhaivatam. It is a pentatonic scale (audava-audava rāgam in Carnatic music classification – audava meaning 'of 5'). Its ārohaṇa-avarohaṇa structure (ascending and descending scale) is as follows (see swaras in Carnatic music for details on below notation and terms):

- ārohaṇa : S R₂ M₁ P N₂ Ṡ (Note: Alternate notations: Hindustani: S R M P Ṉ Ṡ; Western: C D F G B♭ C)
- avarohaṇa : Ṡ N₂ P M₁ R₂ S (Note: Alternate notations: Hindustani: Ṡ Ṉ P M R S; Western: C B♭ G F D C)

This scale uses the notes chatushruti rishabham, shuddha madhyamam, panchamam and kaisiki nishadam. Madhyamavati is considered a janya rāga of Kharaharapriya, the 22nd Melakarta rāga.

== Related rāgas ==
Madhyamavati's notes when shifted using Graha bhedam, yields 4 other major pentatonic rāgas, namely, Mohanam, Hindolam, Shuddha Saveri and Udayaravichandrika (also known as Shuddha Dhanyasi).
