= Nenjirukkum Varai (1967 film) =

- Poster
- Directed by: Sridhar
- Written by: Sridhar; Chithralaya Gopu (dialogues)
- Produced by: Sridhar
- Starring: Sivaji Ganesan; Muthuraman; Gopalakrishnan; K. R. Vijaya; Geetanjali
- Cinematography: Balakrishnan
- Edited by: N. M. Shankar
- Music by: M. S. Viswanathan
- Production company: Chitralaya
- Distributed by: Chitralaya
- Release date: 2 March 1967
- Running time: 169 minutes
- Country: India
- Language: Tamil

Nenjirukkum Varai (transl. As long as there is a heart) is a 1967 Indian Tamil-language film, directed and produced by C. V. Sridhar. The film stars Sivaji Ganesan, Muthuraman, Gopalakrishnan, K. R. Vijaya and Geethanjali. It revolves around a man struggling with poverty, falling in love with his house owner's daughter.

Sridhar initially decided to make Nenjirukkum Varai as revolving around the theme of the 1965 war between India and Pakistan; the story was dropped after Sridhar learnt that Lal Bahadur Shastri and Muhammad Ayub Khan signed the Tashkent Declaration. Retaining the title, he developed a new story inspired by the Bengali play Shudha (transl. Hunger). The film was shot in black-and-white to emphasise the central theme of poverty, and none of the cast members applied make-up for much of the film.

Nenjirukkum Varai was released on 2 March 1967 and failed at the box office.

== Plot ==
Raghu does odd jobs looking for a big break. He and his friend Peter rent a part of a house. The owner Natarajan's daughter is Raji and Raghu falls in love with her. Raghu meets Siva and likes his character and lets him stay in his rented house. Raji and Siva fall in love. Raghu is devastated when he learns about it, but gets over it and decides to help them. Siva is away when Raji's father dies and Raghu takes care of the orphaned Raji, who is waiting for Siva to come back for her. Meanwhile, Siva hears people gossiping about Raghu and Raji and believes they are having an affair. When Raghu confronts him, he agrees to marry Raji if Raghu agrees to go away. Raghu agrees. How they reconcile forms the rest of the story.

== Cast ==
- Sivaji Ganesan as Raghu (alias) Raghuraman
- Muthuraman as Sivaraman
- Gopalakrishnan as Peter
- K. R. Vijaya as Rajeswari (alias) Raji
- V. S. Raghavan as Natarajan
- Senthamarai as Area Street Rowdy
- Mali as Shankar
- Geethanjali as Sheela

== Production ==
After the success of Vennira Aadai (1965), Sridhar decided to make a film titled Nenjirukkum Varai revolving around the theme of war between India and Pakistan with Sivaji Ganesan portraying an army colonel; however Sridhar decided to drop this film after reading an article about Lal Bahadur Shastri and Muhammad Ayub Khan signing the Tashkent Declaration. Sridhar then developed a story from the Bengali play Shudha, retaining the title Nenjirukkum Varai. He did not adapt the play verbatim, but took only the basic premise and created an otherwise original story. Ganesan and Muthuraman, who were part of the dropped film, were retained for the new film. Sridhar and Chithralaya Gopu discussed the whole script during their car trip to Bangalore.

The song "Nenjirukkum Engalukku" was shot at Beach Road, Madras. The last scene of the song was shot at the fountain near the Mahatma Gandhi statue in the beach. None of the cast members applied make-up for their roles. The only scene where they did was during a wedding. Cinematography was handled by Balakrishnan who earlier worked as assistant cinematographer for Gemini Studios, and editing by N. M. Shankar. Unlike Sridhar's earlier films such as Kadhalikka Neramillai (1964) and Vennira Aadai, Nenjirukkum Varai was shot in black-and-white to emphasise the central theme of poverty.

== Soundtrack ==
Music was composed by M. S. Viswanathan. The song "Poo Mudippal" is set in Simhendramadhyamam raga. "Muthukkalo Kangal" is set in Madhyamavati and Kanada ragas. The song "Nenjirukkum Engalukku" initially was supposed to be penned by Kannadasan; however since he went to Karaikudi due to his cousin's demise, he urged Vaali to pen the song.

Song	Singers	Lyrics
"Nenjirukkum Engalukku"	T. M. Soundararajan, P. B. Sreenivas	Vaali
"Ninaithal Podhum Aaduven"	S. Janaki	Kannadasan
"Muthukkalo Kangal"	T. M. Soundararajan, P. Susheela	Kannadasan
"Poo Mudippal Indha Poonkuzhali"	T. M. Soundararajan	Kannadasan
"Kannan Varum Neramithu"	P. Susheela	Kannadasan
"Enge Neeyo Nanum Ange – Happy"	P. Susheela	Kannadasan
"Enge Neeyo Nanum Ange – Pathos"	P. Susheela	Kannadasan

== Release and reception ==
Nenjirukkum Varai was released on 2 March 1967, and distributed by Chitralaya themselves. Kalki said only half the film was excellent, and it was worth watching for Ganesan's performance. According to Sridhar, the film did not do well at box-office as audience could not digest Ganesan's character dying onscreen.

== Bibliography ==
- Cowie, Peter; Elley, Derek, eds. (1977). World Filmography: 1967. Tantivy Press. ISBN 0-498-01565-3.
- Sundararaman (2007) [2005]. Raga Chintamani: A Guide to Carnatic Ragas Through Tamil Film Music (2nd ed.). Pichhamal Chintamani. OCLC 295034757.
