= Gaud Malhar =

- Thaat: Bilawal
- Type: Sampurna
- Time of day: Any
- Season: Monsoon
- Arohana: S R G M R P , M P D N Ṡ
- Avarohana: Ṡ D N P M G M R S
- Vadi: M
- Samavadi: S

Gaud Malhar is a raga in Hindustani classical music that combines characteristics of Malhar and the now extinct raga named Gaud.

== Film songs ==
Song	Movie	Composer	Artists
Jhir Jhir Barase Savani Ankhiyan	Aashirwad (film)	Vasant Desai	Lata Mangeshkar
Garajat Barsat Bheejata Ailo	Malhar(1951 film)	Roshan (music director)	Lata Mangeshkar
Jurm-e-Ulfat Pe	Taj Mahal (1963 film)	Roshan (music director)	Lata Mangeshkar
Sharabi, Sharabi Ye Savan Ka Mausam	Noor Jehan (film)	Roshan (music director)	Suman Kalyanpur
