= Malhar =

Hindustani raga

Shuddha Malhar
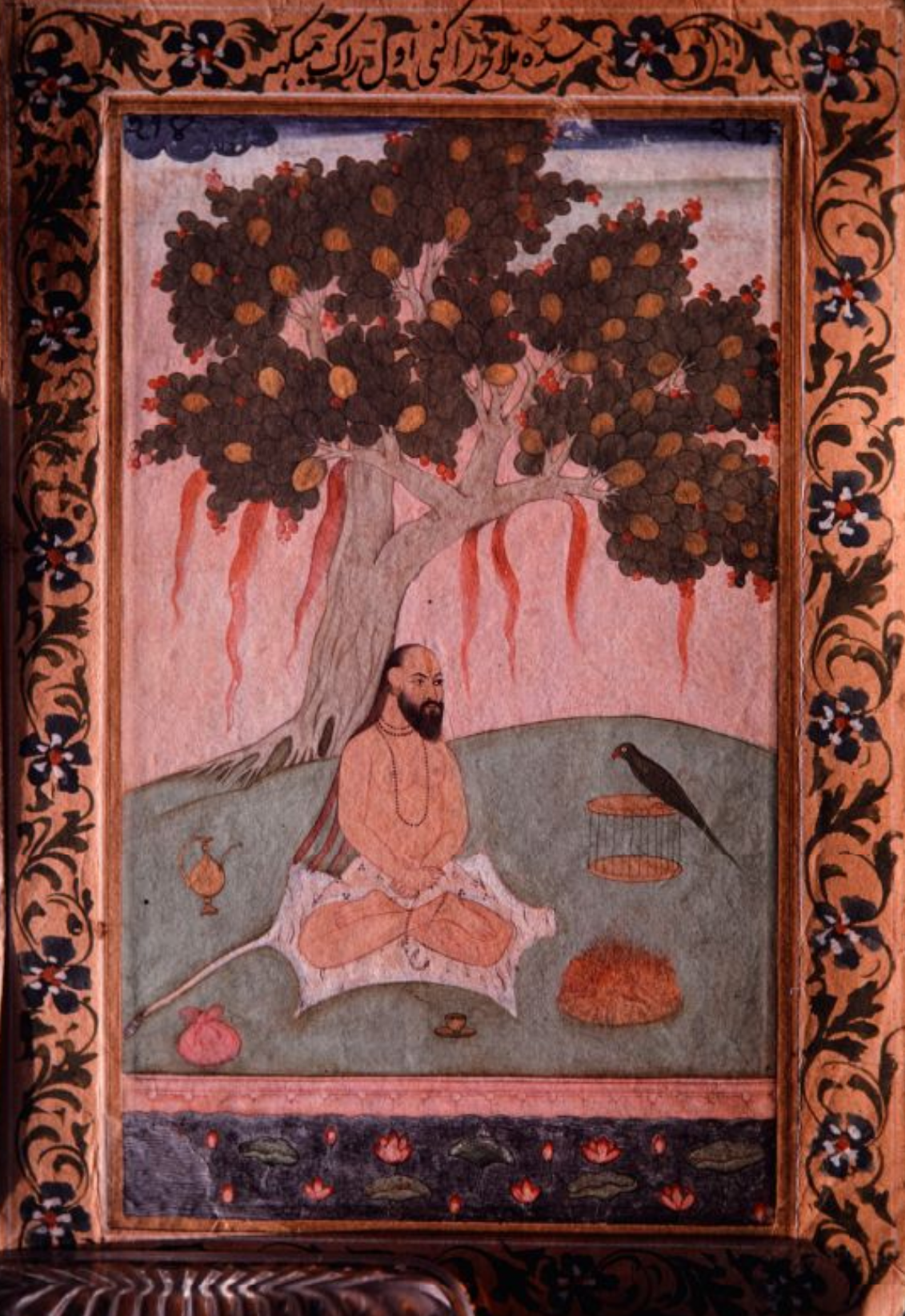
- Thaat: Kafi
- Type: This raga's Jati is Shadhav – Shadhav.; This raga has a Vakra form, i.e. this raga is a Vakra raga (which means that the svaras of a raga are not completely in a particularly straightforward manner).; This raga is a Gambhir Prakruti raga (meaning that is played slow with patience and which is played in a serious tone/note).
- Time of day: any time in monsoon, otherwise in the 2nd Prahar of the Night.
- Season: Monsoon
- Arohana: N S m R P n D N S'
- Avarohana: S' n P m P g(m touch) g(m touch) m R S
- Pakad: N S m R P g m R S m R P n D N S' S' n D n P m P g g m R S
- Chalan: N S m R P g m R S m R P n D N S' S' n D n P m P g g m R S
- Vadi: Pa
- Samavadi: Sa
- Synonym: Miyan Ki Malhar, Miyan Malhar, Tansen Ki Malhar
- Similar: Bahar

Raag Malhar is an ancient raga with many variations, one variation known as Miyan Ki Malhar or Tansen Ki Malhar was popularized by Sangeet Samrat Tansen. Malhar is a Hindustani classical raga. Malhar is associated with torrential rains.

Besides the basic Shuddha Malhar, which was the original Malhar, several Malhar variations or related ragas use the Malhar signature phrase S (m)R (m)R P, including Miyan ki Malhar, Megh Malhar, Ramdasi Malhar, Gaud Malhar, Sur Malhar, Nat Malhar, Dhulia Malhar and Meera ki Malhar. The Malhar Family is based on this signature phrase, where many such other ragas are created and are categorized under this family. This phrase, although it might seem similar and equivalent, is different from the swara phraseology employed in Raga Brindavani Sarang.

It can be determined that raga Miyan ki Malhar is a mixture of ragas Brindavani Sarang, raga Kafi and raga Durga.This raga has a Vakra form (meaning that the swaras of a raga are not completely arranged in a particularly straightforward manner), and is classified as a Gambhir Prakruti raga (meaning that it is played slow with patience, and it is played in a serious tone/note).

== Theory ==
Raga Malhar, also known as Shuddha Malhar, has generally been classified under Kafi thaat (parent scale). Historically, its classification varied across regional musicological treatises. Lochan’s Northern (Hindustani) Ragatarangini classifies Malhar under the Megh parent scale which was also adopted by King Hridayanarayana in the Hrdayakautuka. Conversely, Somanatha’s Southern (Carnatic) Ragavibodha assigns the raga to a dedicated Mallari mela. Abhobala’s Sangitaparijata categorizes a Mallari under Gauri mela, though Vishnu Narayan Bhatkhande noted that this flat-note scale is structurally distinct from modern Hindustani Shuddha Malhar.

These differences explain that historical raga classifications were not equivalent to the modern system and that the name Malhar was often applied to more than one melodic form.

=== Jati ===
Shuddha Malhar is generally described as pentatonic (audava-audava), meaning that it uses five notes in both ascent and descent. The notes Ga and Ni are entirely omitted, leaving only five notes: Sa, Re, Ma, Pa, Dha.

Historical descriptions are not consistent. Some sources describe a Malhar that includes Ni while still calling the raga pentatonic (audava). Bhatkhande noted that these discrepancies often stemmed from manuscript transmission and copying errors.

=== Arohana and avaroha ===
The modern ascent (arohana) and descent (avaroha) of Shuddha Malhar can be considered:

- Arohana (ascent): S R M P, M P D S'
- Avarohana (descent): S' D P M, S R M

The notation is only a simplified representation of the raga, since its identity depends on characteristic melodic movements rather than on a simple ascending and descending scale. In this raga, the movement around Ma as well as the relationship between Re and Pa are important features of its melodic expression.

Older versions of this raga differ from this modern form. The Hrdayakautuka (mid-17th century) describes Shuddha Malhar as having an ascent including Ni, making it hexatonic (shadava) rather than pentatonic (audava).

=== Vadi and samvadi ===
The principal note (vadi) of raga Shuddha Malhar is Ma, and its secondary note (samvadi) is Sa. Some historical sources assign greater importance to Pa, with one key treatise identifying Sa as the principal note and Pa as the secondary note.

- Vadi (principal): M
- Samvadi (secondary): S

=== Pakad ===
The characteristic identity of Shuddha Malhar is commonly represented by phrases centered on Sa Re Ma, with a pronounced resting point on Ma. The glide (meend) between Re and Pa is another defining feature of the raga.

One characteristic phrase is Ma Pa Da Sa' Da Pa Ma, which returns to Ma after reaching the upper tonic. These movements help distinguish Shuddha Malhar from raga Durga, which uses the same five-notes, but treats the notes differently.

=== Malhar variants ===
The name Malhar is also used to describe a group of related ragas whose structure differs substantially from Shuddha Malhar.

For example, Miyan ki Malhar is a heptatonic raga that uses a flat (komal) Ga and both forms of Ni. It is also characterized by the prominent oscillation (andolan) of flat (komal) Ga. Its use of both Ni notes in the ascent, such as P n N S' and S' N n M P, is one of its defining features.

Gaud Malhar combines Malhar material with characteristics associated with Gaud and is particularly associated with the phrase R g R M g R S, alongside characteristic Malhar movements in the upper register.

Sur Malhar and Ramdasi Malhar represent further developments within the Malhar family, each employing different combinations of notes and melodic movements.

These variants should not be treated as alternate scales of a single raga. They are recognized as distinct ragas within the broader Malhar tradition.

=== Samay ===
Malhar is strongly associated with the monsoon (rainy season). It is traditionally considered appropriate at any time of day or night. Outside of the monsoon season, Shuddha Malhar has been associated with the afternoon, with some historical accounts assigning it to the later part of the night.

=== Rasa ===
The aesthetic character (rasa) of raga Malhar is associated with the imagery and emotions of the rainy season. Its compositions frequently describe dark clouds, thunder, lightning, rainfall, cool winds, and the arrival of the monsoon.

A recurring lyrical theme is viraha, or longing caused by separation from a loved one. Traditional texts and compositions often portray women longing for husbands or lovers who are away during the rainy season. Birds associated with the monsoon like the peacock, papiha, and chatrak, also appear frequently in Malhar poetry. Some Malhar compositions use rapid rhythmic syllables and other vocal effects to suggest the sound and intensity of a cloudburst or thunderstorm.

== Historical information ==
Malhar has quite the long textual history, although it is clear that the identity of the raga has changed over time. Medieval and early modern musicological works categorize raga Mallari or Malhar into different melodic families. Their descriptions do not always correspond to the modern understanding of the raga.

Raga Malhar was first recorded under its ancient Sanskrit name, Mallari, in Sharangadeva’s 13th-century music treatise Sangita Ratnakara. By the 17th century, music theorists such as Lochana (Ragatarangini) and King Hridayanarayana (Hrdayakautuka) grouped Malhar under the Megh raga family. In the 20th century, musicologist Vishnu Narayan Bhatkhande noted that these historical descriptions of Mallari differ from modern Shuddha Malhar, particularly in how specific musical notes are used.

The early sixteenth-century Gwalior musical tradition also documents several named varieties of Malhar, including Mukshoo-ki-mallar, Dhondia Mallar, and Charjoo-ki-mallar

Sixteenth-century sources associated with the Mughal period do not provide secure contemporary evidence for the modern name Miyan ki Malhar. Pundarika Vitthala's Ragamala (1576) describes Malhar as a son (suta) of Natta-Narayana, but does not associate it with Miyan Tansen. Even Abu'l-Fazl's A'in-i Akbari praises Tansen as the leading musician at Akbar's court, but does not identify a raga called Miyan ki Malhar or explicitly attribute a Malhar reform to him.

The attribution of Miyan ki Malhar to Miyan Tansen occurs in later musical tradition rather than to documented sixteenth-century evidence. An eighteenth-century Jaipur compilation, the Sangita-sara, provides one of the earliest detailed written descriptions of a raga explicitly called Miya-ki-Mallhar, but it does not attribute its creation to Tansen.

The later history of Malhar consequently reflects both continuity and change: an older Malhar tradition persisted alongside the development of numerous regional, stylistic, and composer-associated variants

== Legend ==
According to legend, Malhar is so powerful that when sung, it can induce rainfall.

Many written accounts describe the Raga Malhar. Tansen, Baiju Bawra, Baba Ramdas, Nayak Charju, Miyan Bakhshu, Tanta rang, Tantras Khan, Bilas Khan (son of Tansen), Hammer Sen, Surat Sen, and Meera Bai are some of those said to be capable of starting rains using various kinds of Raga Malhar.

Mughal emperor Akbar once asked his court musician Miyan Tansen to sing "Raga Deepak", the raga of Light/Fire, which caused all the lamps in the courtyard to light up and Tansen's body to become so hot that he had to sit in the nearby river to cool himself. However, the river began to boil, and it became apparent that Tansen would soon boil to death. So he set out to find someone who could sing Raga Malhar to cure him. In due course, he reached Vadnagar, a town in Gujarat. There he came across two sisters named Tana and Riri, whom he asked for help, to which they agreed. The moment they started singing the Raga Malhar, rains came down in torrents, which helped cool Tansen's body.

The many variations of Raga Malhar have been categorised chronologically by era – prachina (before the 15th century), madhyakalina (15th – 18th century) and arvachina (19th century and beyond). Ragas Shuddha Malhar, Megh Malhar and Gaud Malhar belong to the first period. "Miyan Ki Malhar", also known as Gayand Malahar as both nishads (shudh and komal) swing around the dhaivat like a (gayand) elephant swinging his head.

== Compositions ==
Shuddha Malhar has become relatively uncommon in modern concert performances compared to other Malhar ragas. When a vocalist performs Malhar, the performance typically refers to Miyan ki Malhar, Gaud Malhar, or another Malhar raga. Nevertheless, traditional repertoire preserves compositions associated with the older Malhar form. For example, one composition, Umand ghumand ghana barase, uses rapidly repeated syllables (tarana) to evoke a melodic storm. Another composition, Karim nam tero, is associated with the heptatonic form of Malhar.

Bandish	Writer	Taal	Malhar Type
Tu hi ek hai aneko mei roop tere aur naam suhana	Pandit Gokulotsav Ji Maharaj	Teental	Miyan Ki Malhar (Gayand Malhar)
Jare Kare Badara Umada Ghumad Ghan Ghor	Pandit Gokulotsav Ji Maharaj	Brahmatal (28 beats)	Miyan Ki Malhar (Gayand Malhar)
Umand ghumand ghana barase	Unknown	Teental	Shuddha Malhar

=== Film songs ===
==== Tamil ====
Song	Movie	Composer	Singer
Muthukkalo Kangal	Nenjirukkum Varai	M.S.Viswanathan	T. M. Soundararajan, P. Susheela
Velli Malarae	Jodi	A. R. Rahman	S. P. Balasubrahmanyam, Mahalakshmi Iyer
Thumbi Thullal"(Abheri traces also)	Cobra	A. R. Rahman	Nakul Abhyankar, Shreya Ghoshal
Ennai Konja Konja	Aathi	Vidyasagar	Hariharan, Sujatha Mohan

== In popular culture ==
In Bankim Chandra Chatterjee's Bengali language novel Anandamath (1882), a band of yogis sing Vande mataram in Raga Desh.

In Satyajit Ray's film Jalsaghar, Raga Malhar is used to link the powers of nature and the hero's internal conflict.

The song Thumbi Thullal from the movie Cobra is based on this raag. It is composed by A. R. Rahman and sung by Shreya Ghoshal & Nakul Abhyankar.

The song Garaj Garaj from Web Series Bandish Bandits is based on this Raag, composed by Trio Shankar-Ehsaan-Loy and sung by Farid Hasan & Mohammed Aman

== See also ==
- Malhar (family of ragas)
