= Kankana Banerjee =

Indian Classical singer

- Born: April 19, 1946 (age 80)
- Occupation: Classical singer

Kankana Banerjee (born April 19, 1946) is an Indian Classical singer who trained under the tutelage of Indian classical vocalist Ustad Amir Khan in Lucknow. She has received several accolades and awards for her contribution to Hindustani classical music, including the State Government of Andhra Pradesh felicitation "Andhra Ratna Award (Kala Saraswati)" presented by Mother Teresa in 1987.

== Biography ==
She was born in Bengali, to an affluent family in the city of Calcutta. Her mother, Mandira Chatterjee, was a disciple of Tarapada Chakraborty of Kolkata and Shrikrishna Narayan Ratanjankar of Lucknow. Her grandfather was Radha Kamal Mukherjee, sociologist and former Vice-Chancellor of the University of Lucknow. Kankana Banerjee began Hindustani Classical music training early in her career under the influence and supervision of her mother. In 1955, she began training under Ustad Amir Khan, who hailed from the Indore Gharana. She gave her first public performance at the age of fourteen in the year 1960.

== Career ==
She performed the Darbari Kanara 'Tarana' created by Ustad Amir khan in the style of Amir Khusrau (His Master's Voice studios, Bombay). The track was published by His Master's Voice on a special record ‘Multifaceted genius of Amir Khusrau’. It was released to commemorate the 7th Centenary celebrations of the poet.

Kankana Banerjee became a disciple of Pandit Pratap Narain who belonged to the Mewati Gharana. She has received numerous accolades during her career including the "Kala Saraswati Andhra Ratna Award" from the Government of Andhra Pradesh, presented to her by Mother Teresa.

She has also worked as a playback singer, recording songs based on classical ragas for the films Ram Teri Ganga Maili and Id Mubaraq.

== Marriage and children ==
Kankana Banerjee married Sunil Kumar Banerjee, another disciple of Ustad Amir Khan, at the age of 17. Together they had two children, a daughter and a son. Shortly after the birth of their son, when Kankana Banerjee 21, her husband passed away. Kankana Banerjee never remarried.

== Honours, decorations, awards and distinctions ==
Year	Awards and Honours
1969	Sur Mani - Swami Haridas Sammelan, Bombay
1987	Kala Saraswati - Government of Andhra
1985	Bhatkhande Sangeet Mahotsava, Lucknow
1973	Swami Haridas Sangeet Sammelan, Vrindavan
1979, 1980, 1985, 1990	Pune Sawai Gandharva Sammelan
1978 and 2015	All India Radio Sangeet Sammelan
1986	Late Prime Minister Rajiv Gandhi's 'Apna Utsav festival in Delhi and Bombay
1978	Begum Akhtar Festival
1978 - 2018	Sankat Mochan Samaraho, Varanasi
1971	I.T.C. Sangeet Sabha
1985	Punyatithi of late Indian Prime Minister Indira Gandhi, Safdarjang Road, New Delhi
1987	Mysore Darbar Hall, in the presence of the Indian President R. Venkataraman
1985	I.C.C.R. Samaraho, in the presence of the Indian President R. Venkataraman
2016	The Kirana Gharana Award, named after Ustad Faiyaz and Niyaz Ahmad Khan
