= Sur Sangam =

- Directed by: K. Viswanath
- Written by: K. Viswanath; Vasanth Dev
- Screenplay by: K. Viswanath
- Produced by: Vadde Ramesh; Vadde Shobhanadri
- Starring: Girish Karnad; Jayaprada; Sachin Pilgaonkar; Sadhana Singh; Deven Varma
- Cinematography: P. L. Rai
- Edited by: G. G. Krishna Rao
- Music by: Laxmikant Pyarelal
- Distributed by: Vijaya Madhavi Pictures
- Release date: 1985
- Running time: 143 minutes
- Country: India
- Language: Hindi

Sur Sangam is a 1985 Indian Hindi-language musical drama film written, and directed by K. Viswanath. The soundtrack was helmed by Laxmikant Pyarelal in a true amalgamation of authentic classical sounds with the vocals from Pandit Rajan Sajan Mishras, Lata Mangeshkar, Suresh Wadkar, Kavita Krishnamurthy.

The film is a Hindi remake of Viswanath's 1980 Telugu blockbuster Sankarabharanam and explores the cultural divide between Indian classical and Western pop music through the perspectives of characters from different generations.

== Plot ==
Pandit Shivshankar Shastri, a widower with a daughter named Sarada, is one of the most popular Carnatic singers of the day, famed for having mastered the raga Sankarabharanam. Tulsi is the daughter of a prostitute, who is a devout fan of Shankara Sastri and his music and admires him from afar.

One morning, Tulsi comes across Sastri teaching his daughter singing on a riverbank. Thrilled by Sastri's singing, she begins dancing on the riverbank, oblivious of her surroundings. Sastri sees her, and Tulsi also comes to her senses and abruptly stops. She expects Sastri to rebuke her, but he appreciates her sincerity and continues singing.

Tulsi's mother wants her to follow in the family tradition of becoming a courtesan, believing she can extract a high price for Tulsi from a rich landlord who is interested in her. Tulsi escapes via a train. She comes across Shankara Sastri, hides in his compartment and travels with him for a while, but her mother eventually finds her and brings her back, publicly accusing Shankara Sastri of manipulating and eloping with her daughter while doing so. The deal is struck, and the landlord comes to see Tulsi and rapes her. Seeing a photo of Sastri in Tulsi's room, he breaks it and taunts her by saying that she is now free to be the old Sastri's mistress. The enraged Tulsi stabs him with a shard of glass from the broken frame of Sastri's photo, killing him.

At the subsequent murder trial Sastri engages a close friend, a lawyer, to defend Tulsi. Tulsi's mother is sent to jail for engaging in prostitution, while Tulsi goes free but finds herself homeless. When Sastri takes Tulsi to his own house, the rumour spreads that Tulsi has become Sastri's mistress. Engaged to sing at a temple, everyone, including Sastri's musical accompanists, leaves on seeing Tulsi. Feeling responsible for this public insult to the man she reveres, Tulsi leaves Sastri's home.

Over time, while pop music is on the ascendant, the popularity of classical music wanes, Sastri loses his audience and, with them his comfortable lifestyle. Ten years later, Sastri is living in a small house with his daughter, who has grown into adulthood. Meanwhile, Tulsi has inherited her mother's property after her mother's demise.

Tulsi has a ten-year-old son, the result of her rape, and desires that he become Sastri's student. She intends to make her son, the outcome of an evil, an ornament to adorn Shankara Sastri as his disciple, just as how a venomous snake becomes an ornament of Lord Shiva (Shankara - Shiva, aabaranam- ornament) and therefore, Shankara's aabharanam - Shankarabharanam. Tulsi gets her son to pretend to be homeless, entering Sastri's household as a servant. Tulsi is content to watch from a distance as her son gradually becomes Sastri's musical protege.

Pamulaparti Venkata Kameswara Rao, a schoolteacher by profession but a dilettante singer at heart, falls in love with Sarada. Although Sastri rejects the alliance at first, he agrees after hearing the man sing at the village temple.

Tulsi arranges for a concert on the day of Sarada's wedding, in a new auditorium which she named for her mentor. Sastri sings at the concert but suffers a heart attack part-way through it. His disciple, Tulsi's son, takes over from the sidelines and continues singing the song.

As Sastri watches his student with pride, he also sees Tulsi at the side of the hall and realizes that the boy is Tulsi's son. A doctor is brought to attend to Sastri, but Sastri waves him off, knowing that his end is near. As Tulsi's son completes the song, Sastri symbolically anoints the boy as his musical heir by giving his "aabharanam" (his leg bracelet, or "Ganda Penderam"), once bestowed by society to honor him and effectively became a part of him, to him and dies. Tulsi comes running to her guru, and dies at his feet. The film ends on this tragic but uplifting note, as Sastri's newly-wed daughter and son-in-law take charge of Tulsi's son.

== Cast ==
- Girish Karnad
- Jayaprada
- Sachin
- Sadhana Singh
- Deven Varma
- Asrani
- Paintal
- Mohan Choti
- Bhushan Tiwar
- Bharath Achrekar
- Deena Pathak
- Tabassum
- Sulbha Deshpande
- Rajan Sajan Mishra
- Asha Singh
- Urmila
- S. P. Dubey
- Jith Mohan Mitra
- O. P. Singh
- Mohan
- Krishna Murthy
- Bhimeswara Rao
- Akash Singh
- Baby Mamatha

== Music ==
The music was composed by Laxmikant–Pyarelal and lyrics were by Vasant Dev.

Song	Singer	Raga
Jaaon Tore Charan Kamal Pe Varri	Lata Mangeshkar, Rajan and Sajan Mishra	Bhoopali
Dhanya Bhag Seva Ka Avsar Paya	Rajan and Sajan Mishra, Kavita Krishnamurthy	Bhairavi (Hindustani)
Aaye Sur Ke Panchi Aaye	Rajan and Sajan Mishra	Malkauns
He Shiv Shankar He Karunakar, Parmanand Maheshwar	Rajan and Sajan Mishra	Sohni
Maika Piya Bhulave	Lata Mangeshkar, Suresh Wadkar	Kalavati
Majhi Re Majhi Re	Suresh Wadkar	Charukesi
Sadh Re Man Sur Ko Sadh Re	Rajan and Sajan Mishra	Kirwani
Aayo Prabhat Sab Mil Gao	Rajan and Sajan Mishra, S. Janaki	Bhatiyar
Sur Ka Hai Sopan Surila Amar Lok Le Jaye	Rajan and Sajan Mishra, Kavita Krishnamurthy	
Saadho Aisa Hi Gur Bhaave	Anuradha Paudwal and Rajan and Sajan Mishra	Tilak Kamod
Prabhu More Avagun Chitt Na Dharo	S. Janaki	Bhairavi (Hindustani)
