= Sohni =

Raga in Hindustani classical music

Sohini
- Thaat: Marva
- Time of day: Before sunrise
- Arohana: S G M̄ D N Ṡ
- Avarohana: Ṡ N D, G M̄ D G M̄ G Ṟ S
- Pakad: Ṡ N D, G M̄ D G M̄ G; Ṡ N D, N D G M, G M̄ G Ṟ S
- Vadi: D
- Samavadi: G
- Synonym: Sohani; Sohini

Sohini is a raga in Hindustani classical music in the Marwa thaat. Alternate transliterations include Sohani and Sohni. Like Bahar, it is a small raga, with not much space for elaboration. It emotes the feel of longing, of passive sensuousness.

== Technical Description ==
Tall, virgin, charming, her eyes like lotuses, ears clustered with celestial flowers, Sohini is a lovely form. She holds a lute and her songs are amorous

— Rāga kalpa druma, p. 19

The raga is of audav-shadav nature, i.e., it has five swaras (notes) in the arohana (ascent) and six in the avarohana. Rishabh (Re) is komal and Madhyam (Ma) is tivra , while all other swaras are shuddha. Pancham (Pa) is not used.

The vadi swara is Dha, and samvadi is Ga. The rishabh is weak, but Gandhar (Ga) is strong, unlike Marwa. It is an Uttaranga pradhan raga, with the higher notes on the saptak (octave) being used more frequently.

== Samay (Time) ==
Raga Sohini is associated with very late night / pre-dawn, the last or eighth period of day, roughly from 3-6AM. (3 AM - 6 AM) : 4th Prahar of the Night : Sandhi-Prakash Raag

== Film Songs ==
=== Language : Hindi ===
Song	Movie	Composer	Singers
Kuhu Kuhu Bole Koyaliya	Suvarna Sundari	P. Adinarayana Rao	Mohammad Rafi & Lata Mangeshkar
Jhumati Chali Hava	Sangeet Samrat Tansen	S. N. Tripathi	Mukesh (singer)
Prem Jogan Ban Ke	Mughal-e-Azam	Naushad	Bade Ghulam Ali Khan
Jivan Jyot Jale	Grahasti (film)	Ravi (composer)	Asha Bhosle
Kanha Re Kanha	Truck Driver(1970 film)	Sonik-Omi	Lata Mangeshkar

=== Language:Tamil ===
Note that these are composed in the Carnatic ragam Hamsanandi, which Sohni sounds similar to.

Song	Movie	Composer	Singer
Thesulaavudhe Then Malaraale	Manaalane Mangaiyin Baakkiyam	P. Adinarayana Rao	Ghantasala, P. Susheela
Kaalaiyum Neeye	Then Nilavu	A. M. Rajah	A. M. Rajah, S. Janaki
Ninaithal Podhum Aaduven	Nenjirukkum Varai	M. S. Viswanathan	S. Janaki
Ennakoduppan	Karnan	Viswanathan–Ramamoorthy	P. B. Sreenivas
Ezhumalai Irukka	Thirumalai Deivam	Kunnakudi Vaidyanathan	K. B. Sundarambal
Vedham Anuvilum	Salangai Oli	Illayaraja	S. P. Balasubrahmanyam, S. P. Sailaja
Nee Paadum Paadal	Enkeyo Ketta Kural	Illayaraja	S. Janaki
Putham Puthu	Thalapathi	Illayaraja	K.J. Yesudas, S. Janaki
Or Poomalai	Iniya Uravu Poothathu	Illayaraja	Mano, K. S. Chithra
Keerthana	En Paadal Unakaga	Illayaraja	Mano
Raaga Theebam Yetrum	Payanangal Mudivathillai	Illayaraja	S. P. Balasubrahmanyam
Oru Pooncholai	Vaathiyaar Veettu Pillai	Illayaraja	S. P. Balasubrahmanyam, K. S. Chithra
Sammatham Thanthuten Nambu	Kadhal Devathai	Illayaraja	S. P. Balasubrahmanyam, K. S. Chithra
Ganakkuyilae	Pooncholai	Illayaraja	S. P. Balasubrahmanyam, Bhavatharini
Raathiriyil Poothirukum	Thanagamagan	Illayaraja	S. P. Balasubrahmanyam, S. Janaki
Vaanam Niram Maarum	Dhavani Kanavugal	Illayaraja	S. P. Balasubrahmanyam, S. Janaki
Nee Varuvai	Gowrimanohari	M.M.A. Iniyavan	S. P. Balasubrahmanyam
Ezhu Swaramum	Oru Pudhiya Kadhai	Uma Kannadasan	S. P. Balasubrahmanyam
Pottu Vaithu Poomudikkum	Ninaithen Vandhai	Deva	S. P. Balasubrahmanyam, Swarnalatha
Vaname Ketkutha En Paatu	Nadodi Kathal	Deva	Malaysia Vasudevan
Idhya Veliyil	Oru Pudhiya Udhayam	Deva	Mano, Swarnalatha
Anbe Anbe	Chinna Raja	Deva	P. Unnikrishnan
Oh Vennila	Senbaga Thottam	Sirpy	K.J. Yesudas
O Kannukkul	Dhinamdhorum	Oviyan	P. Unnikrishnan, Swarnalatha

== Further information ==
It is somewhat similar to Marwa and Puriya ragas in the same thaat, and also to Basant in the Poorvi thaat.
