= Poorvi (disambiguation) =

Poorvi may refer to:

- Poorvi Star, an Indian military service medal
- Poorvi (thaat), a thaat of Hindustani music
- Poorvi Koutish, Indian singer

== See also ==
- Purvi (disambiguation)
