= Indore gharana =

Genre in Hindustani classical music

Indore gharana is one of the vocal gharanas of Indian classical music. It was founded by Amir Khan, who studied the styles of Abdul Wahid Khan, Aman Ali Khan, Rajab Ali Khan and Abdul Karim Khan and amalgamated their style.

Amir Khan grew up in Indore, India but he did not like the factionalism inherent in the gharana tradition. In an interview to Akashvani, Indore, he said:

In fact I want only one gharana in classical music, which should be termed as Hindustani Music, and it should have different departments. These are gharanas. If the main thing is kept in this form, then our mutual recriminations with respect to music will be reduced. Many separate styles were formed out of one style of a gharana, as in the case of languages. Many languages came out of one language, similarly styles and gharanas were formed in music. Nowadays, I am singing in the name of "Indore gharana".

Performances in the Indore gharana are noted by the vilambit tempo in the style of Abdul Wahid Khan, and the taans reminiscent of Rajab Ali Khan. The merukhand structure is similar to that practiced by Aman Ali Khan of the Bhendibazaar gharana. The khayal gayaki in the 'Indore gharana' retains the slow development and restraint from frills as in the dhrupad. Mohan Nadkarni says of Amir Khan's music that whereas Bade Ghulam Ali Khan's music was extroverted and exuberant, Amir Khan's music was an introverted, dignified 'darbar' style

Amir Khan's conviction about the importance of poetry in khyal compositions (he used to compose under the pen name, Sur Rang), has also marked the singing of the 'Indore gharana'.

Characteristics of the Indore gharana include:

- slow-tempo raga development
- improvisation mostly in lower and middle octaves
- tendency towards serious and expansive (darbari) ragas
- emphasis on melody
- bol alap and sargam using merukhand patterns
- sparing application of murki and other embellishments to preserve introspective quality
- use of kan swaras (acciaccatura) in all parts of performance
- rare use of tihai
- careful enunciation of text of bandish - the bandish performance may or may not include antara
- multiple laya (tempo) jatis in a single taan
- mixture of taan types in a single taan
- use of ruba'idar tarana (considered similar to chhota khyal)

After Amir Khan's death in a car accident in Kolkata in 1974, the "Indore gharana" has become a powerful stream in modern Hindustani music. Direct disciples of Amir Khan included Pandith Amarnath, Shankar Lal Mishra, Kankana Banerjee, Purvi Mukherjee, and others. However, a number of influential musicians including Sultan Khan (sarangi player) have developed their music under 'Indore gharana' influence.

== Prominent exponents ==
- Gokulotsavji Maharaj
- Kankana Banerjee
- Shanti Sharma
- Baldev Raj Verma
- Ramneek Singh
- Akhil Kumar Das
- Amarjeet Kaur (a disciple of Ustad Amir Khan and Pandit Amarnath)
