= Raga shree =

Raga shree may refer to:

- Shree (Hindustani raga)
- Shree (Carnatic raga)
