= Merukhand =

Merukhand is an improvisational style in Hindustani classical music involving permutations of a fixed set of swaras or notes (meru, axis or skeleton) broken up in various ways (khand, fragment), while retaining the proper emphasis on various notes as required by the raga.

Merukhand techniques were developed within the Bhendibazar gharana and popularized by masters like Aman Ali Khan and Abdul Waheed Khan. In the mid-1950s, they were adopted by the eclectic Amir Khan in his own badhat (progression), although he did not use pure merukhand but inserted merukhandi passages into his performance. His disciple Thomas Ross says of this permutational style that

improvisational forays treating merely three or four notes may occupy twenty minutes or more.

Merukhand is now a part of the improvisational strategy within the Indore gharana founded by Amir Khan.
