= Purvi (disambiguation) =

Purvi may refer to:

- Purvi, a raga in Hindustani classical music
- Purvi Patel, Indian American whose conviction was overturned
- Purvi Champaran Lok Sabha constituency, Lok Sabha (parliamentary) constituency
- Purvi Shah, Indian writer

== See also ==
- Poorvi (disambiguation)
