= Anjanibai Malpekar =

Indian classical singer (1883–1974)

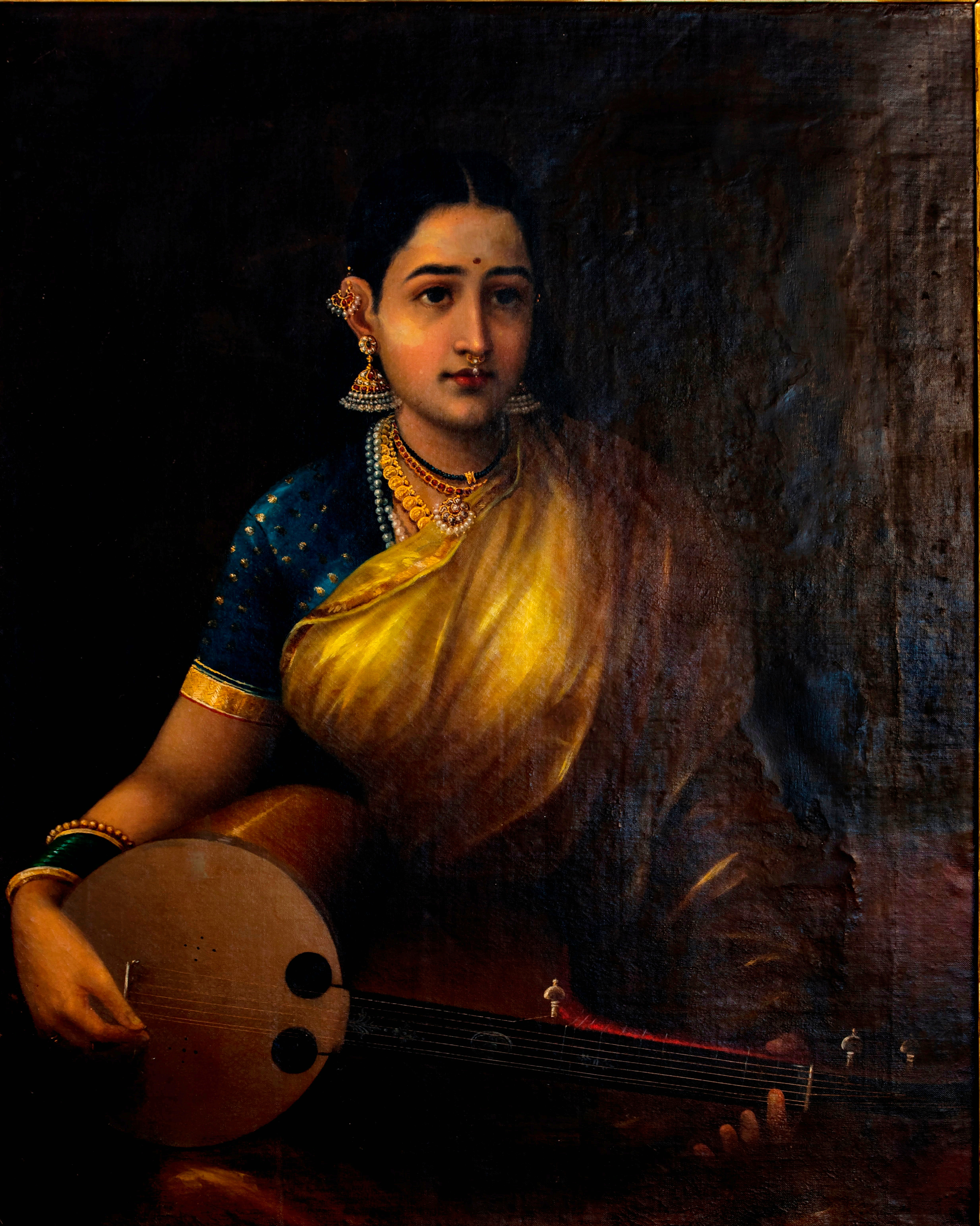
- Lady Playing the Swarbat, a painting by Raja Ravi Varma, featuring Malpekar as the muse.
- Born: 22 April 1883; Pernem, Goa, Portuguese India
- Died: 7 August 1974 (aged 91); Bombay, Maharashtra, India
- Spouse: Seth Wasanji Ved
- Musical career
- Genre: Hindustani classical music
- Occupations: vocalist, music educator
- Years active: 1899–1923

Anjanibai Malpekar (22 April 1883 – 7 August 1974) was an Indian classical singer, belonging to the Bhendibazaar gharana of Hindustani classical music. In 1958, she became the first woman to be awarded the Sangeet Natak Akademi Fellowship, the highest honour conferred by the Sangeet Natak Akademi, India's National Academy for Music, Dance and Drama. Acclaimed for her beauty in her youth, Malpekar was the muse of painters Raja Ravi Varma and M. V. Dhurandhar.

== Early life ==
Anjanibai Malpekar was born on 22 April 1883, in Malpe, Pernem in Portuguese Goa, in music loving family that belonged to Goan Kalavant community. Both her grandmother Gujabai and mother Nabubai were respected names in music circles. Her grandfather Vasudev Malpekar was also a respected classical musician and singer. At the young age of 8, she started her musical training under the tutelage of Ustad Nazeer Khan of Bhendibazaar gharana. The gharana had its origins in the much older Moradabad gharana, and was based in the Bhendi Bazaar area of Bombay. Anjanibai Malpekar had a devadasi background. In addition to being proficient in classical music, she was also an excellent kathak dancer.

== Career ==
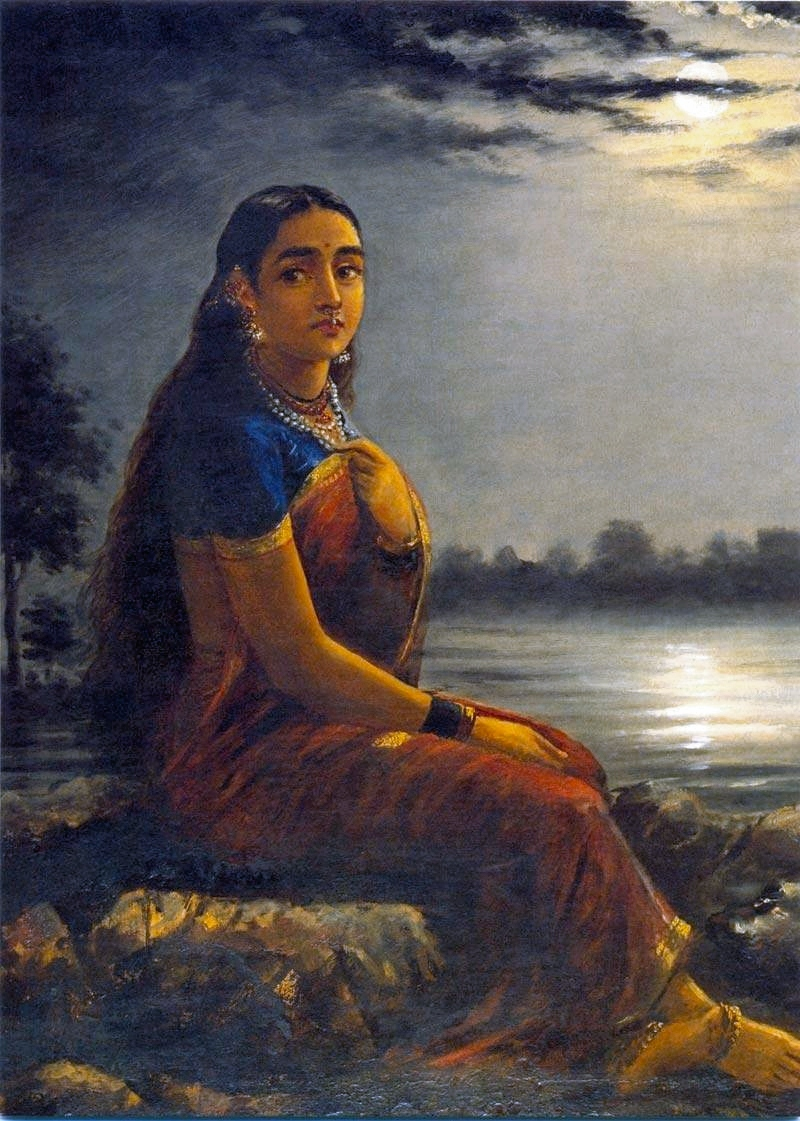
Malpekar became the muse for Raja Ravi Varma's "Lady in the Moonlight" (1889)

Malpekar gave her debut performance at a concert in Bombay, British India, in 1899, at the age of 16. In those days, women of "respectable families" never sang in public, while Malepakar went on to have a flourishing singing career, with both public and royal patronage. In time, she became the doyenne of the gharana.

Besides her singing, she also got acclaim for her beauty. When painter M. V. Dhurandhar did an oil painting of her, another painter Raja Ravi Varma was inspired, and went to do a series of paintings with her as his muse, including "Lady in the Moonlight", "Lady Playing Swarbat", "Mohini" and "The Heartbroken". She modelled for him during his stay in Bombay in 1901 and 1903. However this wasn't without its drawback, especially when singing in public concerts meant singing primarily to a male audience, this often led to harassment. Thus in 1904, she even developed fear of singing in public, and lost her voice, though she regained it after a year.

=== Marriage and later years ===
Meanwhile, she married Seth Wasanji Ved. After a successful career as a singer, after the death of her Guru Ustad Nazeer Khan in 1920, she lost interest in concerts. Finally, after a last performance at Town Hall, Mumbai, she gave up her public singing career in 1923. Thus at age 40, she decided to devote the rest of her years, to teaching music. In the coming decades, she taught some notable names in Indian classical music, including Kumar Gandharva who was her first disciple, Kishori Amonkar, Pandit T.D. Janorikar (1921–2006), Begum Akhtar and Naina Devi. By the 1960s, Bhendibazar gharana based in Mumbai, became famous all over India, with number of popular musicians, besides Aman Ali Khan, it had Jhande Khan, Mamman Khan, Shabbir and Amir Khan.

== Honours ==
In 1958, when for her contribution to music, she was awarded the Sangeet Natak Akademi Fellowship the highest honour conferred by Sangeet Natak Akademi, India's National Academy for Music, Dance and Drama, she became the first woman to receive the award.

== Death ==
She died on 7 August 1974 in Bombay (now Mumbai), at the age of 91.

== Gallery ==
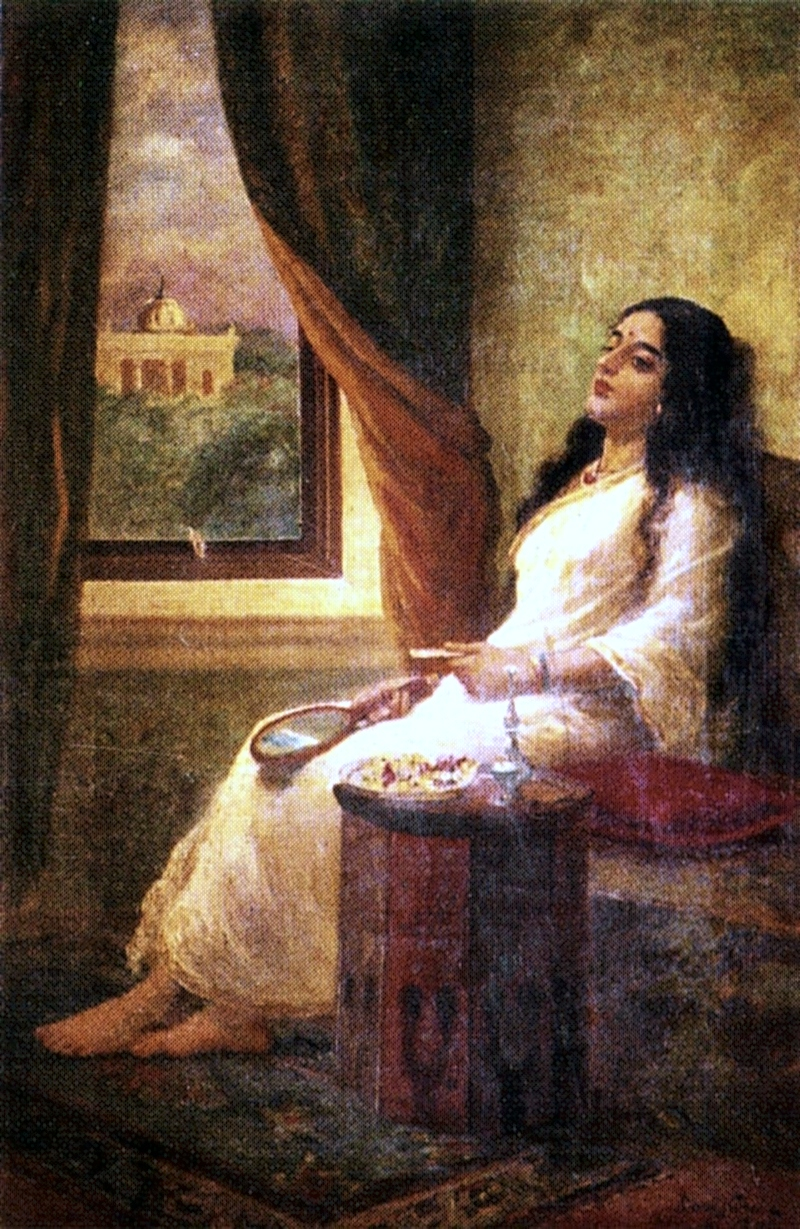
The Heartbroken by Raja Ravi Varma

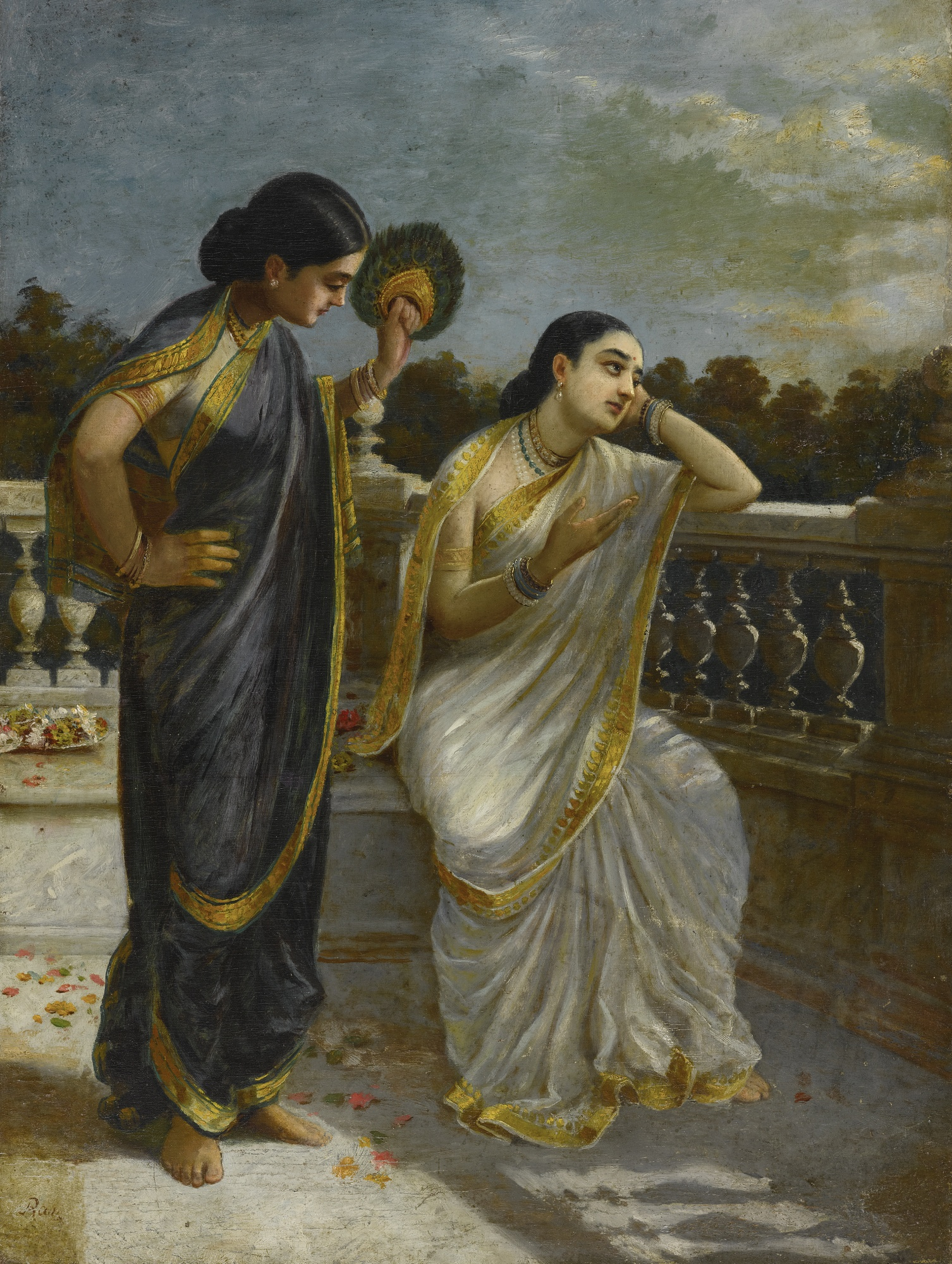
Ladies in the Moon Light by Raja Ravi Varma

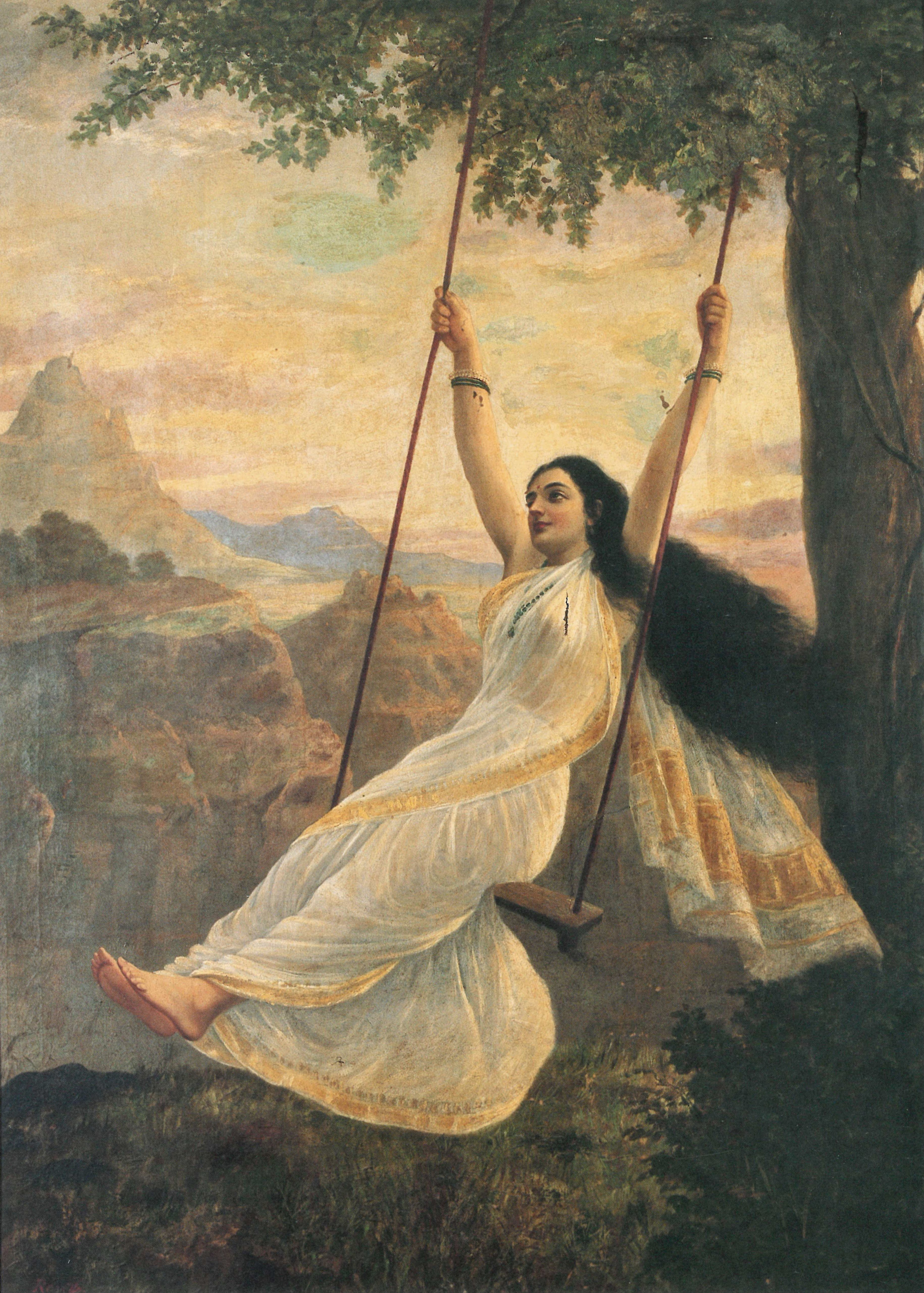
Mohini by Raja Ravi Varma
