= Marva (raga) =

Hexatonic Indian raga

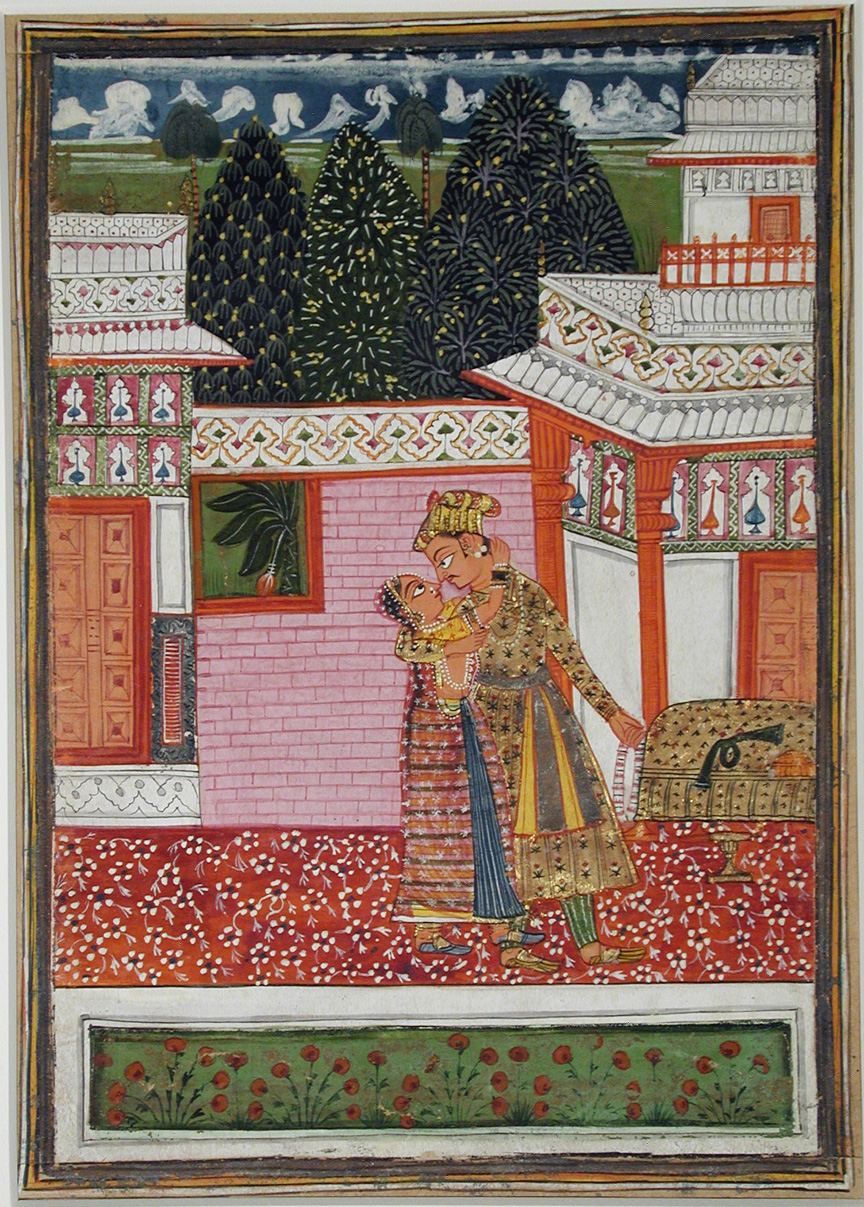
- Thaat: Marva
- Time of day: Sunset
- Arohana: 'Ni Re Ga M̅a̅ Dha Ni Re' S'
- Avarohana: Re' Ni Dha M̅a̅ Ga Re 'Ni 'Dha Sa
- Equivalent: Malavi, Maru

Raag Marwa or Marva is an Indian raag belonging to Hindustani classical music. This is a masculine raaga and conveys an emotion of longing or separation.This is a sandhiprakash raaga of sandhyakaaleen samay.This means that it is sung during dusk hour. This raag includes Teervra Madhyam and Komal Rishab and Pancham the 5th note is totally varjit or prohibited. The Kshadaj or Sa in this raag hold a special place. Kshadaj is considered to be the most important swara in this raag but is allowed to be used as minimum as possible in order to create a feeling of longing and frustration of patience for the swara. This minimizling the use of Kshadaj ultimately helps the raaga to achieve its proper mood

== Aroha and Avaroha ==
Arohana: 'Ni Re Ga M̅a̅ Dha Ni Re' S'

Keeping the key in C, in the Western scale this would roughly translate to: B D♭ E F♯ A B D♭ C

Avarohana: Re' Ni Dha M̅a̅ Ga Re 'Ni 'Dha Sa

The Ma is actually Ma Tivratara, which is a perfect fourth above Re komal (which is 112 cents above Sa))

== Vadi and Samvadi ==
The Vadi is komal Re, while the Samvadi is shuddh Dha. Notice that these do not form a perfect interval. So V.N.Paṭvardhan says "It is customary to give Re and Dha as vādi and saṃvādi, but seen from the point of view of the śāstras (treatises) it is not possible for re and Dha to be saṃvādī (i.e. consonant) to each other. For this reason, in our opinion it is proper to accept Dha as vādī and Ga as saṃvādī" On the other hand if Ga receives too much emphasis, it would create the impression of raga Puriya

== Pakad or Chalan ==
Sa is omitted within a taan; it may only be used at the end of a phrase and even then is used infrequently. Bhatkhande gives the pakad as Dha M̅a̅ Ga Re, Ga M̅a̅ Ga, Re, Sa. Patwardan has shown the mukhya ang as Re Ga M̅a̅ Dha, Dha M̅a̅ Ga Re, but points out that the raga is also clearly indicated by: 'Ni Re Ga M̅a̅ Dha, Dha M̅a̅ Ga Re 'Ni Re Sa.

The chalan given by Ruckert is: 'Ni 'Dha Re 'Ni 'Dha 'M̅a̅ 'Ni 'Dha 'Ni 'Dha Sa Re Ga M̅a̅ Dha M̅a̅ Ni Dha M̅a̅ Ga Re Sa 'Ni 'Dha Re Sa

== Organisation and relationships ==
Thaat: Marwa

Puriya and Sohni have the same tonal material. In Puriya Ni and especially Ga are emphasised.

Komal re of Marwa is slightly higher than komal re of Bhairavi

According to O.Thakur Pūrvā Kalyāṇa is Marwa with Pa and less emphasis on komal Re. R. Jha treats Bhaṭiya as a mixture of Marwa and Maand. There is only one Author (B. Subba Rao) mentioning a raga Māravā Gaurī, thus Moutal does not consider this an own form. Aspects of Marwa are also incorporated in Mali Gaura

For western listeners the tone material may feel strange. As the sixth is emphasised while the tonic is omitted it may feel like playing in A Major, while the base tone is C (not C sharp). If the musician turns back to Sa at the end of a phrase it always comes like a surprise note.

== Behaviour ==
Ni is not a leading note to Sa. Because Sa is omitted Ni leads to re or Dha (and then only to Sa), as in "Ḍ Ṇ r S" or "r Ṇ Ḍ S" .

=== Samay (Time) ===
Sunset (4 - 7 p.m.)

=== Rasa ===
Bor characterizes Marwa as "heroic". In ragamala paintings Malav (see history) is often pictured as lovers walking towards the bed-chamber.

Marwa is also characterised as quiet, contemplative, representing gentle love. According to Kaufmann is the overall mood defined by the sunset in India, which approaches fast and this "onrushing darkness awakes in many observers a feeling of anxiety and solemn expectation".

Puṇḍarika Viṭṭhala (16th century) describes as follows:

The king at war always worship Maravi, whose face shines like the moon and who has long tresses of hair. With moist eyes, faintly smiling, she is adorned skillfully with sweet smelling flowers of different varieties. Her complexion gleams like gold; she is attired in red and her eyes are like those of a fawn. She is the elder sister of Mewar. In Marwa Ni and Ga are sharp, Sa is the graha and amsa and Ri and Dha are the nyasa.

== Historical information ==
Marwa's forerunners (Maru or Maruva) have different scales in the literature from the 16th century onwards. Pratap Singh (end of 18th century) writes that Marwa is the same as the ancient Mālavā, and its melodic outline is very similar to today's Marwa Also Jairazbhoy reports that Locana's Mālavā "may be the origin of modern Mārvā"

=== Important recordings ===
- Amir Khan, Ragas Marwa and Darbari, Odeon LP (long-playing record), ODEON-MOAE 103, later reissued by His Master's Voice as EMI-EALP1253. This recording redefined Marwa by moving the primary development down to the lower octave compared to the traditionally middle octave.
- Ravi Shankar, "In New York", Angel Records (July 18, 2000). ASIN: B00004U92S. Original Recording 1968.
- Imrat Khan, "Raga Marwa", Nimbus Records (1992), NI 5356 (recorded July 10, 1990)
- Ali Akbar Khan, "Raag Marwa" Connoisseur Society US (1968)
- Ustad Rashid Khan, "Raag Marwa" Masterworks from the NCPA archives (Aug)
- “Friends” by Led Zeppelin

== General and cited references ==
- Bagchee, Sandeep (1998), Nād, Understanding Rāga Music, Mumbai: Eshwar (Business Publication Inc.), ISBN 81-86982-07-8
- Bor, Joep (c. 1997), The Raga Guide, Charlottesville, Virginia: Nimbus Records, archived from the original on 2009-07-15
- Gosvami, O. (1957), The Story Of Indian Music, Bombay: Asia Publishing House
- Jairazbhoy, N. A. (1995), The Rags of North Indian Music: Their Structure & Evolution, Bombay: Popular Prakashan
- Jha, Ramashraya (1968–78), Ābhinava Gītānjali (2 vols.), Allahabad: Sangeet Sadan Prakashan
- Kaufmann, Walter (1968), The Ragas of North India, Calcutta: Oxford & IBH Publishing
- Moutal, Patrick (1991), A Comparative Study of Selected Hindustāni Rāga-s, New Dheli: Munshiram Manoharlal Publishers Pvt Ltd, ISBN 81-215-0526-7
- Mukherji, Kumar Prasad (2006), The Lost World of Hindustani Music, New Dheli: Penguin India, ISBN 0-14-306199-2
- Viṭṭhala, Puṇḍarika (1576), Rāga-Mālā, Bhandarkar Oriental Institute, Poona MS No. 1062
