= Shivkumar Shukla =

Indian classical vocalist

Shivkumar Shukla शिवकुमार शुक्ला
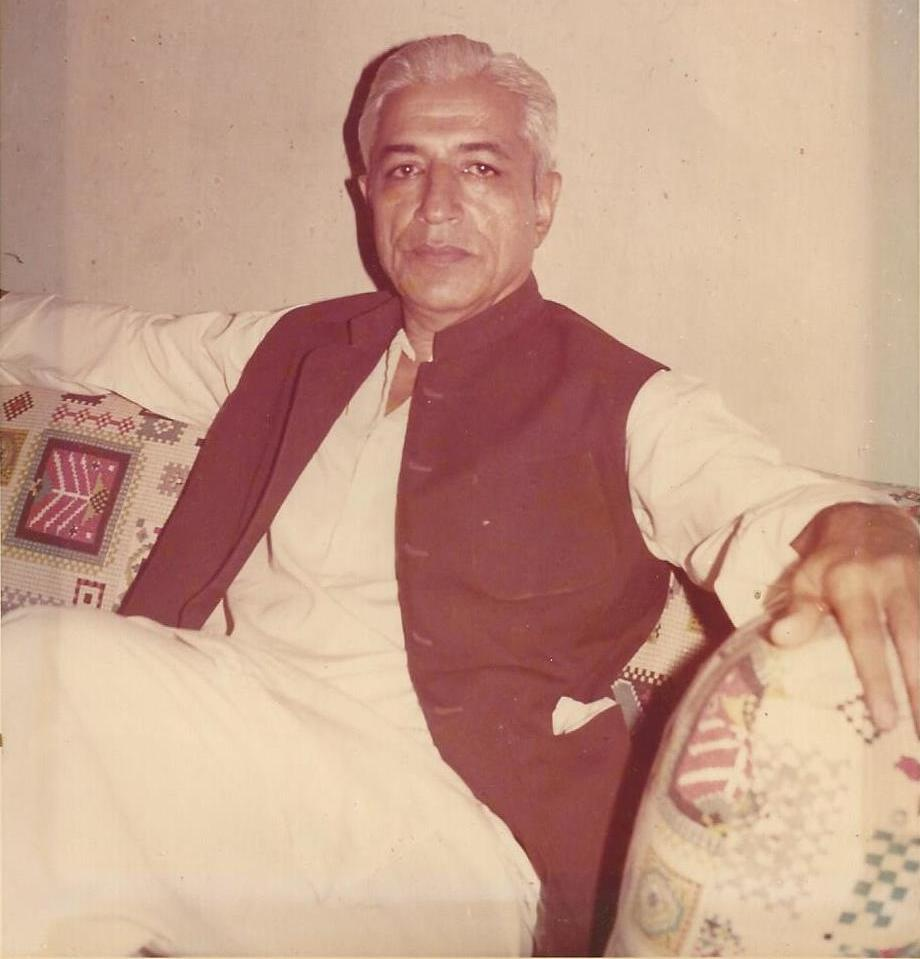
- Shivkumar Shukla

Background information
- Also known as: Sangeet Rasraj
- Born: 12 July 1918; Gondal, Bombay Presidency British India
- Died: 31 December 1998 (aged 80) Vadodara, Gujarat, India
- Occupation: classical singer

Pandit Shivkumar Shukla (12 July 1918 – 31 December 1998) was an Indian classical vocalist of the Bhendibazaar gharana. A recipient of the 1992 Sangeet Natak Akademi Award, he was known for his works in Khayal form of Hindustani classical music. He was a disciple of Indian classical vocalist and composer Ustad Aman Ali Khan. Shukla was known as "Sangeet Rasraj", a title which was given to him by Pandit Omkarnath Thakur.

== Biography ==
Shivkumar Shukla was born on 12 July 1918 in Gondal, a small princely state in British India. He was interested in music from childhood and started his initial training under the guidance of Baburao Gokhle in Mumbai in 1932.

Impressed by his progress in 7 years, the Maharaja of Gondal state in 1934, appointed him as the court musician of the state when he was 16. Shukla then started his study of music under Pandit Omkarnath Thakur. In 1936, at a concert in Karachi, Pandit Omakarnath awarded Shukla the title of "Sangeet Rasraj".

He died on 31 December 1998 in Vadodara.

== Career ==
In 1939, Shukla heard Ustad Aman Ali Khan of Bhendibazaar gharana, and became the disciple of him. Shukla gave several performances at conferences and concerts all over India. He performed at the memorial of his Guru Ustad Aman Ali Khan as his foremost disciple. In 1951, the vice chancellor of Maharaja Sayajirao University of Baroda, Baroda invited him to join as a professor and Dean of Faculty of Performing arts. He retired as Dean of faculty of performing arts in 1978.

His notable disciples include Pandit Dayanand Devgandharva, Manoj Patel, Vasanti Sathe, Mukund Vyas, Sangeeta Pandharpurkar, Anil Vaishnav, Dwarkanath Bhonsle, Pandit Ishwarchandra, Subhash Desai, Neelam Yajnik, Mitalee singh, Kiran Shukla, and Chintan Patel.

== Awards ==
Shukla received the following awards:

- 1930 – Members of Legislative Council of India Gold Medal at Mumbai, given by K.M. Munshi
- 1939 – Gold Medal by Maharashtra Sangeet Vidyalay
- 1951 – conferred a Medal at Delhi by the 1st President of India Rajendra Prasad
- 1967 – awarded by Triveni Organization at Vadodra for "outstanding services rendered as a leading singer and guru"
- 1971 – awarded by Gujarat Sangeet Natak Akademi
- 1980 – awarded by ITC Sangeet Academy, Calcutta
- 1985 – honored by Gujarat Sangeet Samiti at Valsad, Gujarat
- 1990-91 – Gujarat State's Pandit Omkarnath Award
- 1992 – Sangeet Natak Akademi Award
