= Basant Bahar =

Basant Bahar may refer to:

- Basant Bahar (raga), a raga in Hindustani classical music
- Basant Bahar (film), a 1956 Indian film
