= Kamavardhani =

51st raga in the Melakarta

Kamavardhini
- Arohanam: S R₁ G₃ M₂ P D₁ N₃ Ṡ
- Avarohanam: Ṡ N₃ D₁ P M₂ G₃ R₁ S

Kamavardhini (pronounced kāmavardhini – కామవర్ధిని/ ಕಾಮವರ್ಧಿನಿ/ காமவர்தினி / कामवर्धिनि) is a ragam in Carnatic music (musical scale of South Indian classical music). It is the 51st Melakarta rāgam in the 72 melakarta rāgam system of Carnatic music. It is also referred by the name Pantuvarāḷi.

This rāgam is very popular with musicians who typically sing it in the beginning of a concert. It is called Kāshirāmakriya in the Muthuswami Dikshitar school. The Hindustani music equivalent of Kamavardhini is the Poorvi thaat/Puriya Dhanashree.

== Structure and Lakshana ==
Kamavardini scale with Shadjam at C

It is the 3rd rāgam in the 9th chakra Brahma. The mnemonic name is Brahma-Go. The mnemonic phrase is sa ra gu mi pa dha nu. Its ārohaṇa-avarohaṇa structure (ascending and descending scale) is as follows (see swaras in Carnatic music for details on below notation and terms):

- ārohaṇa: S R₁ G₃ M₂ P D₁ N₃ Ṡ (Note: Alternate notations: Hindustani: S Ṟ G M̄ P Ḏ N Ṡ; Western: C D♭ E F♯ G A♭ B C)
- avarohaṇa: Ṡ N₃ D₁ P M₂ G₃ R₁ S (Note: Alternate notations: Hindustani: Ṡ N Ḏ P M̄ G Ṟ S; Western: C B A♭ G F♯ E D♭ C)

(the notes in this scale are shuddha rishabham, antara gandharam, prathi madhyamam, shuddha dhaivatham, kakali nishadham)

It is a sampoorna rāgam – a rāgam that has all seven swaras (notes). This rāgam differs from the 15th melakarta rāgam Mayamalavagowla, which is the rāgam taught to a beginner in Carnatic music, only by the madhyamam. Kamavardhani is the prati madhyamam equivalent of Mayamalavagowla.

== Janya rāgams ==
It has a few minor janya rāgams (derived scales) associated with it. See List of janya rāgams for full list of rāgams associated with it.
