= Amar Nath =

Pandit Amarnath
- Born: Pandit Amarnath; 1924-03-22
- Died: 1996-03-09
- Genres: Indian classical music (Khyal, Tarana)
- Occupation: Hindustani Classical Vocalist
- Website: Pandit Amarnath official site

Pandit Amarnath (1924 – 1996) was an Indian Classical Vocalist and film music composer. He composed music for the film Garam Coat in 1955. He should not be confused with the very popular composer of the same name, Amarnath, who was very active in Lahore and Mumbai film industry.

He was the first and closest disciple of Amir Khan, who founded the Indore gharana of Indian classical music. While Amir Khan had specially propagated the vilambit or the slow style of singing, Amarnath further enriched the gharana with the mystic poetry he wrote as bandish for khayal singing, under the pen-name of Miturang.

== Early life and career ==
Amarnath was born in 1924 in Jhang in Punjab, now in Pakistan. He received his initial training in music from B.N. Datta of Lahore, from 1942 to 1947, and moved to Delhi after the partition of India. It was his first guru, Prof. Datta, who suggested that he go to Khan for further learning. As Amarnath was already singing the Ustad's style, and as public opinion was that the disciple sounded so much like his guru, Amir Khan was convinced about his sincerity, and accepted him as a disciple.

Besides devoutly following Amir Khan's style, teaching and demonstrating the style, Amarnath also served at All India Radio for eight years as composer, recruited specially by Ravi Shankar during the latter's tenure at AIR. Amarnath later served as Director of Triveni Kala Sangam, and then as Guru at the Shriram Bharatiya Kala Kendra in Delhi. He also provided music for the 1955 film Garam Coat starring Balraj Sahni and Nirupa Roy, with songs by Lata Mangeshkar. Amarnath also directed the music for a documentary on Mirza Ghalib. This included the first and only ghazal recorded in the voice of Amir Khan; the documentary was made by M. S. Sathyu.

Amarnath died on 9 March 1996.

== Legacy ==
The book, Conversations with Pandit Amarnath conducted by Bindu Chawla based on conversations with him, was published by Indira Gandhi National Centre for the Arts, Delhi, in the year 2004. A book on his mémoires of Amir Khan, titled "Indore ke Masiha/Prophets of Indore, mémoires of my guru, Ustad Amir Khan Saheb", was published in 2008 by the Pandit Amarnath Memorial Foundation. The Pandit Amarnath Vaggeyakar Samman, or Composer's Award, is instituted in his memory every year by the Pandit Amarnath Memorial Foundation, whose Chairperson is his daughter, Bindu Chawla.

== Bibliography ==
- Amarnath, Pandit (1989). Living Idioms in Hindustani Music: A Dictionary of Terms and Terminology. Vikas Publishing House. ISBN 978-0-7069-4682-6.
- Amarnath, Pandit (1997). Haṃsā ke baina (in Hindi). Radhakrishna Pub. ISBN 9788171193080.
- Bindu Chawla (2004). Conversations with Pandit Amarnath. Indira Gandhi National Centre for the Arts. ISBN 978-81-85503-07-3.
- Amarnath, Pandit (2008). Indore ke masihā: Paṇḍita Amaranathaji dwara Ustad Amir Khan sahab ke sansmaran (in Hindi). Pandit Amarnath Memorial Foundation. ISBN 978-81-7525-934-8.
