= Akhtar Sadmani =

Bangladeshi singer

- Born: 2 January 1934
- Died: 30 December 2003 (aged 69)
- Genres: Indian Classical (Hindustani)
- Occupations: Singer, music director
- Instrument: Vocalist
- Years active: 1961–2003

Akhtar Sadmani (2 January 1934 – 30 December 2003) was a Bangladeshi singer. In 2011, he was awarded Ekushey Padak by the government of Bangladesh for his contribution to performance arts.

== Early life and background ==
Sadmani was born in Dhaka, but was brought up in Kolkata. His father, Akbar Ali, introduced him to music. At the age of ten, he received initial training from Bobby Daniel, a student of Zamiruddin Khan. In 1955, Bobby Daniel took him to the musician Omar Khan, who continued his training.

In 1957, Omar Khan personally introduced Sadmani to Amir Khan (of the Indore Gharana). Since then he received training and advice from Amir Khan as well. He also received Khyal training from Amanat Ali, Fateh Ali, Manjur Hossain Khan and Foyez Mohammad, and Dhrupad training from Zahiruddin Dagar and Faiyazuddin Dagar.

== Career ==
In 1961 Sadmani returned to East Pakistan and joined Radio Pakistan in Dhaka a year later as an artist. He became a music director in Radio Bangladesh in 1966. In 1980, he established the "Sur Rang Academy of Classical Music". The academy was the first of its kind in Bangladesh, solely devoted to Indian classical music.

== Personal life and death ==
Sadmani had three sons: Late Asif Akhtar Sadmani, Amin Akhtar Sadmani, and Yusuf Akhtar Sadmani, and one daughter Mily Akhtar Sadmani. He suffered a heart attack and died on 30 December 2003.
