= Marva (thaat) =

Basic thaat of Hindustani music

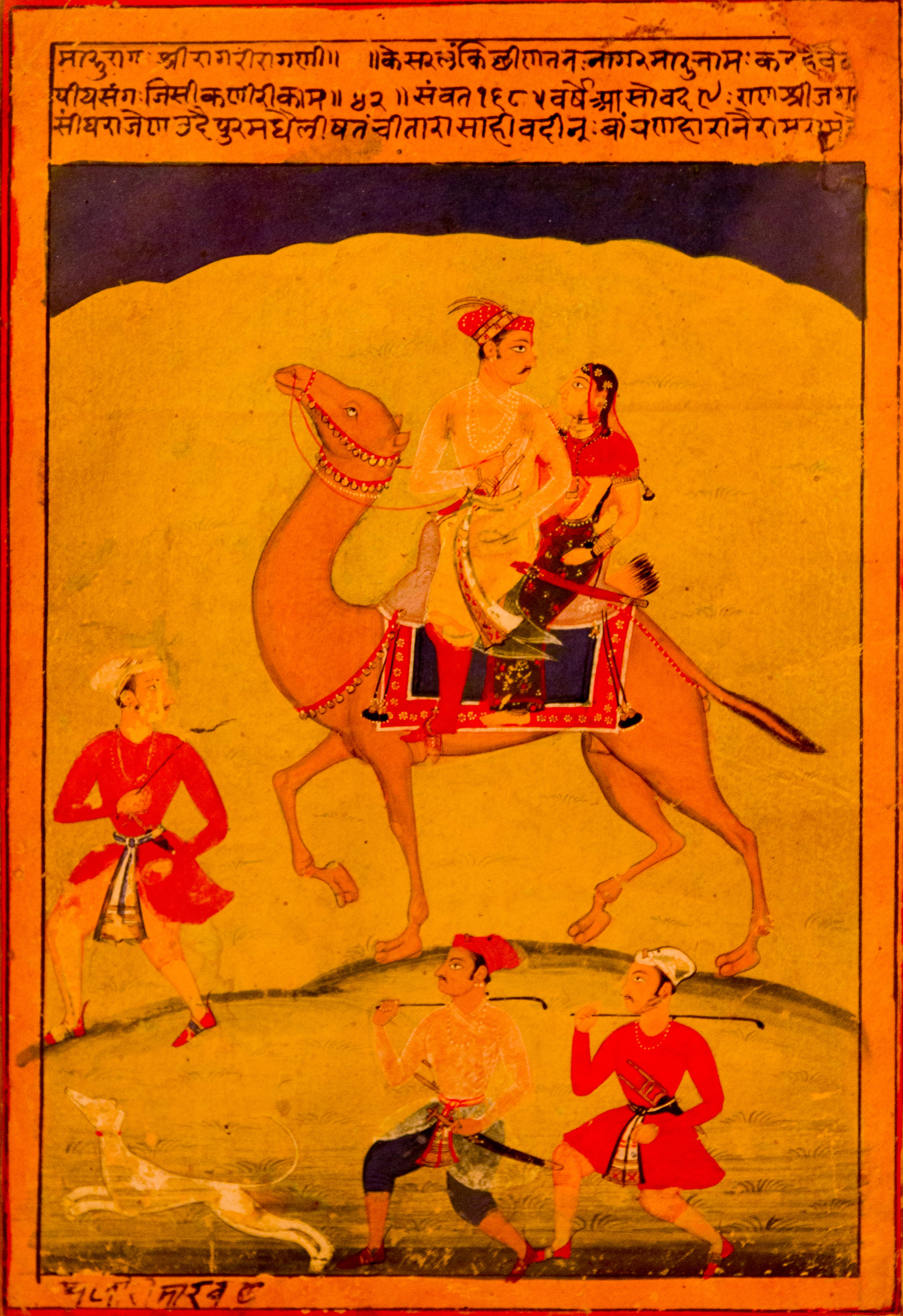
Ragini Maru of Sri Raga, from 1628 until 1685, Mewar, Rajasthan

Marva or Marwa (IAST: Mārvā) is one of the ten basic thaats of Hindustani music from the Indian subcontinent. It is also the name of a raga within this thaat.

== Description ==
Marva thaat is obtained by adding a komal Rishabh to the Kalyan thaat. The mood of the Marva family of ragas is strongly and easily recognisable.

== Ragas ==
Other ragas in Marva thaat:

- Marva
- Puriya
- Sohni
- Lalit (although it is sometimes placed in Purvi thaat)
- Bibhas (two other types of Bibhas are placed in Bhairav thaat or Purvi thaat)
- Pancham (Hindol Pancham)
- Maligaura
- Purba (Purbya)
- Purvakalyan
- Jait (Jayat) (not to be confused with Jait Kalyan
- Varati (raga)
- Bhatiyar
- Bhankar
- Lalita Gauri (sometimes placed in Purvi thaat)
- Sazgiri

According to O. Thakur Pūrvā Kalyāṇa is Marwa with Pa and less emphasis on komal Re. R. Jha treats Bhaṭiya as a mixture of Marwa and Maand. There is only one Author (B. Subba Rao) mentioning a raga Māravā Gaurī, thus Moutal does not consider this an own form. Aspects of Marwa are also incorporated in Mali Gaura.
