= Basant (raga) =

Hindustani raga

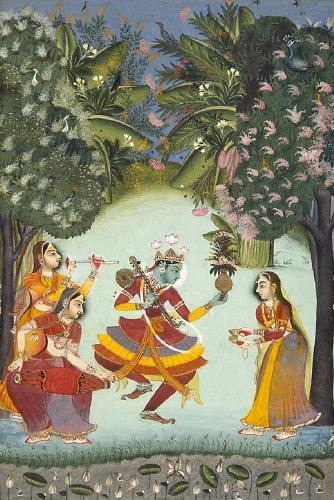
- Thaat: Purvi
- Time of day: Any time during spring
- Season: Spring
- Arohana: S G M̄ Ḏ N Ṡ
- Avarohana: Ṡ N Ḏ P M̄ G ❟ M̄ G Ṟ S
- Vadi: Sa
- Samavadi: Pa
- Similar: Purvi; Paraj; Puriya Dhanashri

Basant or Vasant is a Hindustani classical raga.

== Raga ==
Every raga has a strict set of rules which govern the number of notes that can be used; which notes can be used; and their interplay that has to be adhered to for the composition of a tune. In the Guru Granth Sahib Ji, there are a total of 60 raga compositions and this raga is the forty-ninth raga to appear in the series. The composition in this raga appear on a total of 29 pages from page numbers (Ang) 1168 to 1170.

Basant denotes the changing of the season and the newness of spring. This Raag encourages the mind to brush away its selfishness, just like spring-cleaning removes all the cobwebs and creates a fresh start. There are feelings of hope and expectation of a new beginning and the start of a new cycle. However, these emotions are not dependent on the physical change of the season, but are an encouragement of an internal effort to change.

== Origin ==
Vasant is a Sanskrit word for "spring". The word is much older than the Sikh religion and any usage of the word in relation to melody or Sikh tradition is a later rendition of the word.

The variants noted in the Holy Book are Basant-Hindol and Shudh Basant which also called Desi Basant in the local language. Basant is a very old raga dating from the 8th century. Guru Nanak Dev Ji, Guru Amar Das Ji, Guru Ram Das Ji, Guru Arjan Dev Ji and Guru Tegh Bahadar Ji composed Shabads in this raga. Performed in slow tempo, this gentle melody depicts quiet joy. The descending scale is usually found at the beginning of a composition with the ascending form follows later.

- Aroh: S G M̄ Ḏ N Ṡ (Note: Alternate notations: Carnatic: S G₃ M₂ D₁ N₃ Ṡ; Western: C E F♯ A♭ B C)
- Avroh: Ṡ N Ḏ P M̄ G ❟ M̄ G Ṟ S (Note: Alternate notations: Carnatic: Ṡ N₃ D₁ P M₂ G₃ ❟ M₂ G₃ R₁ S; Western: C B A♭ G F♯ E 𝄒 F♯ E D♭ C)
- Vadi: S
- Samvadi: P

== Variants ==
- Shuddha Basant
- Adi Basant
- Basant Bahar
- Hindol Basant

== Film songs ==
=== Tamil ===
Song	Movie	Composer	Singer
"Arul Jothi Deivam"	Thisai Maariya Paravaigal	M.S.Viswanathan	Balamurali Krishna, Abhaya (his wife)
"Om Nadam Omkara Nadam"	Miruthanga Chakravarthi	M.S.Viswanathan	T. M. Soundararajan
"Sandhikka Thudittaen"	Vedham Pudhithu	Devendran	S. P. Balasubrahmanyam, S. Janaki
"Anbenum Sudaral"	Kaalangalil Aval Vasantham	Vijaya Bhaskar	Vani Jayaram
"Vazhimel Vizhiyaal"	Archanai Pookal	Ilaiyaraaja	S. Janaki

== Sources ==
- Bor, Joep; Rao, Suvarnalata (1999). The Raga Guide: A Survey of 74 Hindustani Ragas. Nimbus Records with Rotterdam Conservatory of Music. p. 30. ISBN 978-0-9543976-0-9.

== See also ==
- Kirtan
