= Bhatiyar =

- Thaat: Marwa
- Time of day: Early morning, 3–6
- Arohana: S M ❟ P G ❟ M̄ D Ṡ
- Avarohana: ̱̱Ṙ N D P M ❟ P G Ṟ S
- Pakad: M D S'; r' N D P; D m P G r S
- Chalan: S m P D N r' N D m P G r S; S-D-P-D-m-P-G-M-D-S; r-N-D-P-D-m-P-G-r-s
- Vadi: M
- Samavadi: S
- Synonym: Bhatihar; Bhatiyari
- Similar: Mand

Bhatiyar (IAST: Bhaṭiyār) is a Hindustani classical raga assigned to the Marva thaat.

== Theory ==
Arohana: S M ❟ P G ❟ M̄ D Ṡ (Note: Alternate notations: Carnatic: S M₁ ❟ P G₃ ❟ M₂ D₂ Ṡ; Western: C F 𝄒 G E 𝄒 F♯ A C)

Avarohana: ̱̱Ṙ N D P M ❟ P G Ṟ S (Note: Alternate notations: Carnatic: Ṙ₁ N₃ D₂ P M₁ ❟ P G₃ R₁ S; Western: D♭ B A G F 𝄒 G E D♭ C)

Vadi: M

Samavadi: S

Thaat: Marva.

Pakad or Chalan: S m P D N r' N D m P G r S

M̄ D S', r' N D P, D m P G r S

Or we have other way for Chalan as

S-D-P-D-m-P-G-M-D-S, r-N-D-P-D-m-P-G-r-s

Time: Early morning, 3–6

== Behaviour ==
Behaviour refers to practical aspects of the music. It is complicated to talk about this for Hindustani music since many of the concepts are fluid, changing, or archaic. The following information cannot be accurate, but it can attempt to reflect how the music existed. The raag Bhatiyar was the favorite raag of famous Hindi film music director, SD Burman.

== Film Songs ==
Song	Movie	Composer	Singers
Aayo Prabhat	Sur Sangam	Laxmikant–Pyarelal	Rajan of Rajan and Sajan Mishra & S. Janaki

== Sources ==
- Bor, Joep; Rao, Suvarnalata (1999). The Raga Guide: A Survey of 74 Hindustani Ragas. Nimbus Records with Rotterdam Conservatory of Music. p. 38. ISBN 9780954397609.
- Bhaṭiyār Rāga (Hin), The Oxford Encyclopaedia of the Music of India. Oxford University Press. ISBN 9780195650983.
