= Rajab Ali Khan =

Singer (1874–1959)

Rajab Ali Khan (3 September 1874 at Narsinhgarh, Madhya Pradesh – 8 January 1959 at Dewas, Madhya Pradesh) was an Indian classical vocalist and poet.

== Early life and career ==
Rajab Ali Khan learned music from his father Manglu Khan in the tradition of Bade Mohammad Khan, and from Bande Ali Khan Beenkar. Therefore his style was a mix of the Jaipur Gharana and Kirana gharana styles. He was a court musician of Dewas and Kolhapur. He also performed on concert tours. He was also a court musician of Ram Singh II of Jaipur State.

In 1909, he was conferred the title of Sangeet Ratna Bhushan by the Maharaja of Mysore, and in 1954 he received a Sangeet Natak Akademi Award. His last big concert was held in 1957, in Bombay now called Mumbai.

Rajab Ali was known as a master khayaliya but he was also a noted player of Rudra Veena, Sitar, Jaltarang and tabla. As a khyaliya Rajab Ali Khan was known for his expansive singing full of melodic patterns as well as his very fast and intricate taans.

His disciples include his nephew Aman Khan and other musicians like Nivruttibuwa Sarnaik, Ganpatrao Dewaskar, Krishna Shankar Shukla, Krishnarao Majumdar, Rajabhau Deo, Yasin Khan (sarangi player), and Jyotiram of the Mewati gharana. Amir Khan of Indore gharana and Salamat Ali Khan of Sham Chaurasia gharana of Pakistan were also influenced by his taans. "He was a master of very vibrant, complex and speedy taan."
