= Puriya Dhanashree =

Hindustani classical music raga

- Thaat: Purvi
- Time of day: After sunset
- Arohana: Ṇ Ṟ G M̄ Ḏ N Ṡ or Ṇ Ṟ G M̄ Ḏ N Ṟ Ṡ
- Avarohana: Ṡ N Ḏ P M̄ G Ṟ S
- Vadi: P
- Samavadi: Ṟ
- Equivalent: double harmonic #4 scale
- Similar: Bhairav

Puriya Dhanashree is a raga in Hindustani classical music. It belongs to the Purvi thaat and has been derived from the defining raga of that thaat – Raga Purvi.

The notes of Puriya Danashree correspond, in Western terms, to the double harmonic scale with an augmented fourth.

== Structure ==
Raga Purvi, the "type-raga" of the Purvi thaat contains all seven notes (i.e. Shadaj, Rishabh, Gandhar, Madhyam, Pancham, Dhaivat and Nishad). But the rishabh and the dhaivat are komal both in ascent and descent and the madhyam varies from teevra to shuddh whereas the gandhar and the nishaad stay shuddh throughout.

In Puriya Dhanashree, however, the aarohan or the ascent is as follows - -N r G M d N S+. This shows that pancham is not used very often in the aarohan thereby making it a shaadav aarohan or an aarohan with six notes. Rishabh and Dhaivat are komal or flat in Raag Puriya Dhanashree wheres the Madhyam is teevra or sharp. The descent or the avarohan is as follows: S+ N d P M G M r G r S, the descent bears all seven notes with komal Dhaivat and Shadaj and a teevra Madhyam. The vadi of this raga is pancham and the samavadi is rishabh. Raag Purvi's structure is very close to that of raga Puriya Dhanashree therefore in order to differentiate between the two shuddha madhyam is often used in raga purvi unlike the teevra madhayam used in raga Puriya Dhanashree.

The gayan samay or the time of singing this raga is at dusk. Raag Puriya Dhanashree is sung at time of transition from the afternoon to the evening and thus it is known as a Sandhiprakash Raga. The pakad of this Raga or the catch phrase of this Raga under the Bhatkande system is -N r G, M r G P, M d P, M G M r G d M G r S. While expounding the uttaranga part of this Raga the phrase M d N d S+ is used to move into the taara saptak (higher octave). The transition from the taara saptak Re to the Madhya Saptak Ni is commonly through the use of a meendh.

== Raga-Rasa Theory ==
Each sruti or micro tonal interval has a definite character; the names manda, candovati, dayavati, ranjani, raudri, krodha, ugra or khsobhini denote their emotional quality which dwells in combination or singly in the notes of the modal scale: thus, dayavati, ranjani and ratika dwell in the gandhara and each of the notes (swara) of the scale in its turn has its own kind of expression and distinct psychological or physical effect and can be related to a colour, a mood (rasa or bhava ), a metre, a deity or one of the subtle centres (chakra) of the body. ...Thus for the sringara (amorous or erotic) and the hasya (laughter) rasa, the madhyama and the pancham are used; for the vira (heroic), raudra (wrathful) and the adbhuta (wondrous), the shadja and the rishabha; for the bibhatsa (repulsive) and the bhayanaka (fearsome), the dhaivata; and for the karuna (compassionate), the nisada and the gandhara are used. Every swara stands for a certain definite emotion or mood and has been classified according to its relative importance, and it forms a different part of the `person' of the modal scale.

== Recordings ==
- Pt. Ravi Shankar, on India's Master Musician, World Pacific Records, 1959 (as Raga Puriya Dhanashri)
- Pt. Bhimsen Joshi, on Raga Miyan Ki Todi/Raga Puriya Dhanashri, His Master's Voice, 1963 (as Raga Puriya Dhanashri)
- Pt. Pran Nath, on Palace Theatre, Paris 1972, Volume II, Sri Moonshine Music, 2017 (as Raag Puriyaa Dhanaashree)

== Film Songs ==
=== Language: Tamil ===
Note that songs are composed in the Carnatic ragam Pantuvarāḷi, which Puriya Dhanashree sounds similar to.

| Song | Movie | Composer | Singer |
|---|---|---|---|
| Amba Manamkanindhu | Sivakavi | Papanasam Sivan | M. K. Thyagaraja Bhagavathar |
| Yezhu Swarangalukul(Ragamalika with Sindhubairavi, khamboji) | Apoorva Raagangal | M. S. Viswanathan | Vani Jairam |
| Neerada Neram | Vaira Nenjam | M. S. Viswanathan | Vani Jairam |
| Arpudha Kalaidhan | Idhaya Nayagan | Deva | Vani Jairam |
| Intha Nimisham | Hello | Deva | Hariharan, K. S. Chithra |
| Thenthoovum Vasandham | Vaidehi Kalyanam | Deva | Mano, K. S. Chithra |
| Karmegam Oorgolam Pogum | Kalamellam Un Madiyil | Chandrabose | S. P. Balasubrahmanyam, S. Janaki |
| Devi Devi | Naan Adimai Illai | Vijay Anand | S. P. Balasubrahmanyam, S. Janaki |
| Rojavai Thaalattum | Ninaivellam Nithya | Illayaraja | S. P. Balasubrahmanyam, S. Janaki |
| Kaadhal Ennum Kaaviyam | Vattathukkul Chaduram | Illayaraja | Jikki |
| Piraye Piraye | Pithamagan | Illayaraja | Madhu Balakrishnan |
| Om Sivoham | Naan Kadavul | Illayaraja | Vijay Prakash |
| Ninnaichcharan Adainthen | Bharathi | Illayaraja | Bombay Jayashree |
| Yenna Varam Vendum | Nandhavana Theru | Illayaraja | Mano, Lekha, Sindhu Devi |
| Sree Ramavaarai | Sri Rama Rajyam | Illayaraja | Chinmayi, Sakyath |
| Aadum Pambirukuthu(Ragam Panthuvarali touches) | Illam | Illayaraja | P. Jayachandran |
| Enna Nadakkudhu Saami | Maamanithan | Illayaraja | Muthu Sirpy |
| Nalam Paaduven | Kanmaniye Pesu | Raveendran | S. Janaki |
| Hai Rama | Rangeela | A. R. Rahman | Hariharan, Swarnalatha |
| Athini Sithini | Thenali | A. R. Rahman | Hariharan, Chitra Sivaraman, Kamal Haasan |
| Macha Machiniye | Star | A. R. Rahman | Unni Menon |
| Muththa Mazhai | Thug Life | A. R. Rahman | Chinmayi Sripada, Dhee |
| Oh Nenjame | Paasakanal | S. A. Rajkumar | K. J. Yesudas, Sunandha |
| Adi kadhal Enpathu | Ennavalle | S. A. Rajkumar | Hariharan |
| En Vanam Neethana | Dhinamdhorum | Oviyan | S. P. Balasubrahmanyam, Shenoy Balesh |
| Or Aayiram Yaanai | Nandhaa | Yuvan Shankar Raja | P. Unnikrishnan |
| Amma Endralle | Nandhaa | Yuvan Shankar Raja | Illayaraja |
| Poovum Malarnthida | Swarnamukhi | Swararaj | S. P. Balasubrahmanyam, Swarnalatha |
| Kangal Theduthey | Manathodu Mazhaikalam | Karthik Raja | Sadhana Sargam, Jassie Gift |
| Devathaiyai Mannil | Jjunction | Bharadwaj | Srinivas, Reshmi |
| Or Mirugam | Paradesi | G. V. Prakash Kumar | V. V. Prasanna, Pragathi Guruprasad |
| Marandhaye | Teddy | D.Imman | Anya Swaras D1* |
| Enge Ponai | Jeeva | D. Imman | S. P. Balasubrahmanyam |

== Other Songs ==
Rock/Metal: War of Kalinga -Suraj Synthesist
