= Rangeela (1995 film) =

1995 film by Ram Gopal Varma

- Poster
- Directed by: Ram Gopal Varma
- Written by: Ram Gopal Varma
- Dialogues by: Neeraj Vora; Sanjay Chhel
- Produced by: Jhamu Sughand; Ram Gopal Varma
- Starring: Aamir Khan; Urmila Matondkar; Jackie Shroff
- Cinematography: W. B. Rao
- Edited by: Eeshwar Nivas
- Music by: A. R. Rahman
- Production company: Varma Creations
- Release date: 8 September 1995
- Running time: 150 minutes
- Country: India
- Language: Hindi
- Budget: ₹4.5 crore
- Box office: ₹33.4 crore

Rangeela (transl. Colourful) is a 1995 Indian Hindi-language musical romantic drama film written, directed and co-produced by Ram Gopal Varma. It stars Aamir Khan, Urmila Matondkar and Jackie Shroff. The film was A. R. Rahman's first Hindi film with an original score and soundtrack, as his previous Hindi releases were dubbed versions of his Tamil, Malayalam and Telugu films.

Rangeela released on 8 September 1995 and proved to be a major box office success. The film received critical acclaim upon release, with particular praise directed towards the film's soundtrack and Matondkar's performance, thus proving to be a breakthrough for her. It was screened at the mainstream section of the International Film Festival of India.

At the 41st Filmfare Awards, Rangeela received 14 nominations – Best Film, Best Director (Varma), Best Actor (Khan) and Best Actress (Matondkar), and won 7 awards, including Best Supporting Actor (Shroff), Best Music Director (Rahman) and Special Jury Award (Asha Bhosle for "Tanha Tanha").

== Plot ==
A street-toughened orphan by the name of Munna (Aamir Khan) is befriended by some kind folks, whose effervescent daughter Mili (Urmila Matondkar) soon grows to be his best buddy. Both gravitate toward the Mumbai movie industry. While Mili finds occupation as a movie extra, Munna earns his livelihood selling movie tickets in the black market.

Mili has ambitions of becoming an actress. Fortune glances her way when she dances her way into a movie star's attention. This actor, Raj Kamal (Jackie Shroff), arranges for her to be auditioned for the heroine's role in his upcoming film called Rangeela. Mili's shortcomings amount to distractions, but thanks in no small way to Munna and Raj, she lands the role.

Raj and Munna both fall for Mili, but Mili is too busy making the movie to notice any of this. She starts spending a lot of time with Raj during the filming. Munna tries many times to tell Mili that he loves her, but he is unable to, or Raj gets in the way. Eventually, feeling inferior, Munna decides to leave Mili to Raj, who can give her a better life than he can. The matter is not resolved though, as Mili learns of this on the film's opening night after reading the letter that Munna left for her. After learning that Munna is also leaving the town, she emotionally runs out of the function to find Munna. Raj is initially angry at Mili for leaving the function midway. Mili tells Raj that Munna has written in the letter that he loves her but has misunderstood their relationship and left the town for good. Raj is taken aback when Mili tearfully tells him that she too loves Munna and can't think of a life without him. Having realized his mistake, Raj decides to reunite Mili and Munna.

Mili and Raj manage to stop Munna midway. All the misunderstandings get cleared up. Finally, Mili and Munna reunite with a hug.

== Cast ==
- Aamir Khan as Munna
- Urmila Matondkar as Mili Joshi
- Jackie Shroff as Raj Kamal
- Gulshan Grover as Steven Kapoor
- Avtar Gill as P.C.
- Reema Lagoo as Mrs. Joshi, Mili's mother
- Achyut Potdar as Mr. Joshi Mili's father
- Rajesh Joshi as Pakya
- Neeraj Vora as Drunk party guest (bluffer)
- Rajeev Mehta as Restaurant Steward
- Nitin Chandrakant Desai
- Ram Mohan as Make-Up Dada
- Shammi as Gulbadan's mother
- Tarun as Tough guy at the shooting
- Suman as Motilal
- Himanshu
- Aditya Narayan as child singing in "Rangeela Re"
- Saroj Khan as herself (choreographer)
- Remo D'Souza as a background dancer in title song
- Shefali Shah as Gulbadan, the heroine (special appearance)
- Madhur Bhandarkar in a special appearance

== Production ==
Ram Gopal Varma has stated that he was inspired from a personal experience involving a one-sided relationship which influenced the writing of Rangeela.

In the opening credits of the film, each name is accompanied with an image of a vintage film star, including Madhubala, Dev Anand and Amitabh Bachchan.

== Soundtrack ==
Rangeela

Soundtrack album by A. R. Rahman
- Released: 14 May 1995
- Recorded: Panchathan Record Inn
- Genre: Soundtrack
- Length: 44:05
- Label: Tips Music
- Producer: A. R. Rahman

A. R. Rahman chronology
Muthu (1995)	Rangeela (1995)	Indira (1995)

Professional ratings
Review scores
Source	Rating
PlanetBollywood.com	4/4 stars

Rangeela's soundtrack featured 7 songs composed by A. R. Rahman with lyrics penned by Mehboob and an instrumental theme song. The audio was released on 14 May 1995 by Rahman's mother Kareema. According to the Indian trade website Box Office India, with around 32,00,000 units sold the soundtrack became the third highest-selling album of the year.

The soundtrack fetched Rahman two Filmfare Awards – Best Music Director and R. D. Burman Award for New Music Talent. Mehboob got two nominations for Filmfare Award for Best Lyricist, for the tracks "Kya Kare" and "Tanha Tanha". Swarnalatha, Shweta Shetty and Kavita Krishnamurthy were nominated for Filmfare Award for Best Female Playback Singer for their respective tracks.

Asha Bhosle received the Filmfare Special Award that year for her rendition of the song "Tanha Tanha".

The song "Yaaro Sun Lo Zara" was originally composed for a Telugu film Super Police (1994) as "Baabu Love Cheyyara", which was dubbed in Tamil as "Mama Love Pannu" written by Vairamuthu, with the Tamil soundtrack with the same name. The soundtrack was also released in Tamil, with title, Rangeela itself and lyrics penned by Vairamuthu and Palani Bharathi. However, the reused track "Yaaro Sun Lo Zara" was not included in the Tamil and Telugu versions, as it was used in the Telugu film Super Police, which itself was dubbed in Tamil. The soundtrack rights are now acquired by Tips Music Company.

=== Hindi ===
All lyrics are written by Mehboob.

Original Hindi version
No.	Title	Singer(s)	Length
1.	"Rangeela Re"	Asha Bhosle & Aditya Narayan	5:25
2.	"Pyaar Yeh Jaane Kaise" (Raga Desh)	Suresh Wadkar & Kavita Krishnamurthy	5:05
3.	"Mangta Hai Kya"	A.R. Rahman & Shweta Shetty	6:46
4.	"Tanha Tanha Yahan Pe Jeena" (Raga Sindhu Bhairavi)	Asha Bhosle	5:36
5.	"Hai Rama" (Raga Puriya Dhanashri)	Hariharan & Swarnalatha	6:47
6.	"Yaaron Sun Lo Zara"	Udit Narayan, K.S. Chithra	5:53
7.	"Kya Kare Kya Na Kare"	Udit Narayan	5:43
8.	"Spirit of Rangeela"	Instrumental	3:02
Total length:			44:05

=== Telugu (dubbed version) ===
All tracks are written by Sirivennela Seetharama Sastry.

Telugu track list
No.	Title	Singer(s)	Length
1.	"Yaayire"	S. Janaki	5:25
2.	"Aiyayo"	A. R. Rahman, Anupama	6:45
3.	"Yemito Yemo"	Hariharan, Kavita Krishnamurthy	4:59
4.	"Yepudokapudu Kalanthu"	S. Janaki	5:36
5.	"Yemi Cheyyavachu"	Mano	5:42
6.	"Hai Rama" (Raga Puriya Dhanashri)	Hariharan, Swarnalatha	5:14
7.	"Dinakatha (Spirit of Rangeela)"	Anupama	3:02

=== Tamil (dubbed version) ===
Tamil track list
No.	Title	Lyrics	Singer(s)	Length
1.	"Aiyayo Kanava"	Vairamuthu	A. R. Rahman, Anupama	6:45
2.	"Rangeela Rangeela"	Palani Bharathi	Sujatha Mohan	5:25
3.	"Hai Raama" (Raga Puriya Dhanashri)	Vairamuthu	Hariharan, Swarnalatha	5:14
4.	"Taniye Taniye"	Vairamuthu	S. Janaki	5:36
5.	"Kadhali Nee Enna Seivai"	Vairamuthu	Unnikrishnan, Kavita Krishnamurthy	4:59
6.	"Kamban Shelly"	Palani Bharathi	S. P. Balasubrahmanyam	5:42
7.	"Spirit of Rangeela" (Instrumental)	Instrumental	Instrumental, Annupamaa	3:02

== Reception ==
Rangeela opened to critical acclaim and was declared a blockbuster at the box office, grossing ₹33.4 crore. It was the fourth highest-grossing Indian film of 1995. The film marked a major turning point in the careers of several individuals associated with it.

Urmila Matondkar's performance established her as a leading actress in the industry. Her performance, along with chart-topping songs like "Tanha Tanha" and "Rangeela Re," significantly contributed to her newfound stardom. Costume designer Manish Malhotra also rose to fame for his contemporary styling of Matondkar, influencing fashion trends in Bollywood.

The film also proved pivotal for Aamir Khan, with critics and audiences appreciating his chemistry with Matondkar. The choreography, led by Ahmed Khan and Saroj Khan, was especially praised for its vibrant and innovative sequences. Ahmed Khan won the Filmfare Award for Best Choreography for "Rangeela Re," though some critics and Saroj Khan herself believed that her work on "Tanha Tanha" was more deserving.

Saroj Khan reportedly faced disputes with the producers regarding credit, as she was listed as a guest choreographer despite having choreographed four songs in the film.

The film's soundtrack, composed by A. R. Rahman, achieved immense popularity and was credited with significantly contributing to the film's commercial success. Rangeela's music was notable for outperforming the soundtrack of Dilwale Dulhania Le Jayenge at several major award ceremonies.

== Cultural significance ==
Rangeela is widely regarded as a landmark film in Hindi cinema, often credited with ushering in a modern sensibility in Bollywood during the mid-1990s. Its narrative style, vibrant visuals, and contemporary music marked a departure from the melodramatic and formulaic storytelling common at the time.

Urmila Matondkar’s portrayal of Mili redefined the Bollywood heroine, blending sensuality with independence. Her styling, designed by Manish Malhotra, became iconic and influenced fashion trends in Indian cinema. The film is considered instrumental in launching Matondkar into stardom and reshaping the portrayal of female leads in mainstream films.

Aamir Khan’s role as Munna, a street-smart tapori from Mumbai, was a significant departure from his earlier romantic roles and is regarded as a turning point in his career.

The soundtrack, composed by A. R. Rahman, was his first original score for a Hindi film. It became one of the highest-selling Bollywood albums of 1995 and is credited with modernizing the sound of Hindi film music. Songs like "Rangeela Re" and "Tanha Tanha" showcased Rahman's signature blend of Indian and Western elements and remain popular decades later.

The film also launched or elevated several careers behind the scenes. Choreographer Ahmed Khan won the Filmfare Award for Best Choreography for "Rangeela Re," while costume designer Manish Malhotra became one of the most sought-after stylists in the industry.

Rangeela's success and stylistic innovations have led critics and filmmakers to consider it ahead of its time, with director Shekhar Kapur describing it as “the film of the 21st century.”

The film was re-released in theatres with a new 4K UHD restored version on November 28, 2025, 30 years after its original release.

== Accolades ==
Award	Date of the ceremony	Category	Recipients	Result	Ref.
Filmfare Awards	March 1996	Best Film	Rangeela	Nominated	
Filmfare Awards	March 1996	Best Director	Ram Gopal Varma	Nominated	
Filmfare Awards	March 1996	Best Actor	Aamir Khan	Nominated	
Filmfare Awards	March 1996	Best Actress	Urmila Matondkar	Nominated	
Filmfare Awards	March 1996	Best Supporting Actor	Jackie Shroff	Won	
Filmfare Awards	March 1996	Best Music Director	A. R. Rahman	Won	
Filmfare Awards	March 1996	Best Lyricist	Mehboob for "Kya Kare Kya Na Kare"	Nominated	
Filmfare Awards	March 1996	Best Lyricist	Mehboob for "Tanha Tanha"	Nominated	
Filmfare Awards	March 1996	Best Female Playback Singer	Swarnalatha for "Hai Rama"	Nominated	
Filmfare Awards	March 1996	Best Female Playback Singer	Kavita Krishnamurthy for "Pyaar Yeh Jaane"	Nominated	
Filmfare Awards	March 1996	Best Female Playback Singer	Shweta Shetty for "Mangta Hai Kya"	Nominated	
Filmfare Awards	March 1996	Best Story	Ram Gopal Varma	Won	
Filmfare Awards	March 1996	Best Costume Design	Manish Malhotra	Won	
Filmfare Awards	March 1996	Best Choreography	Ahmed Khan for "Rangeela Re"	Won	
Filmfare Awards	March 1996	Special Award	Asha Bhosle for "Tanha Tanha"	Won	
Bengal Film Journalists' Association Awards	1996	Best Actor (Hindi)	Aamir Khan	Won	
