= Poorvi (thaat) =

Basic thaat of Hindustani music

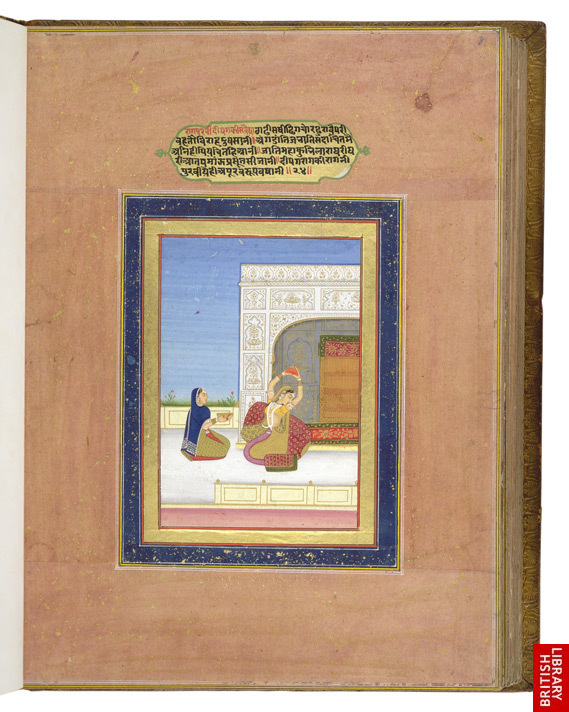
Raag Poorvi, 17th century

Purvi or poorvi is one of the ten basic thaats of Hindustani music from the Indian subcontinent. It is also the name of a raga within this thaat.

== Description ==
Poorvi thaat adds a Komal Dhaivat to Marva thaat. These thaat ragas usually feature komal Rishabh, shuddha Gandhar and Shuddha Nishad along with teevra Madhyam, the note which distinguishes evening from the morning ragas (dawn and sunset). The thaat raga Poorvi is deeply serious, quiet and mysterious in character and is performed at the time of sunset. Pictorial depictions in early texts, often mention the poise, grace, and charm of Poorvi.

== Ragas ==
Ragas in Poorvi thaat include:

- Poorvi
- Puriya Dhanashree
- Gauri
- Shree
- Paraj
- Basant
- Lalit
