= Swami Haridas Sangeet Sammelan =

- Locations: Mumbai, India
- Years active: 1952 - present

Swami Haridas Sangeet Sammelan (English: Swami Haridas Music Festival) is a noted Hindustani classical music and dance festival organized by Sur Singar Samsad, and held annually in Mumbai, India. All the prominent Indian classical vocalists, instrumentalists and dancers perform at the week-long festival.

== History ==
It was started in 1952 in honor of 16th-century saint, Swami Haridas by Sur Singar Samsad.

== See also ==
- List of Indian classical music festivals
