= Bhendi Bazaar gharana =

One of the vocal gharanas of Indian classical music

The Bhendi Bazaar gharana is one of the vocal gharanas of Indian classical music, which originated in Bhendi Bazaar area of Mumbai in 1890.

The founders of the gharana originally belonged to the Moradabad area of Uttar Pradesh. Upon migrating to Mumbai, their gharana became better known as the Bhendi Bazaar gharana instead of Moradabad gharana. Lata Mangeshkar and Manna Dey are prominent playback singers who belonged to this gharana.

== History and features ==
The Bhendi Bazaar gharana was founded around 1890 by brothers Chhajju Khan, Nazir Khan and Khadim Hussain Khan in the Bhendi Bazaar area of Mumbai. This gharana was founded in Bombay in 1890 after these three brothers moved from Moradabad area, Uttar Pradesh to settle in Bombay, British India. The features of this gharana include using 'aakaar' for presenting khyals in an open voice, with clear intonation, a stress on breath-control, singing long passages in a single breath, a preference for madhyalaya (medium tempo) and use of the well-known Merukhand or Khandmeru system for extended alaps. Chhajju Khan's son Aman Ali Khan and Anjanibai Malpekar, are well-known exponents of this gharana. Amir Khan's father Shahmir Khan belonged to this gharana and passed on the tradition to his son.

== Exponents ==
=== 19th century ===
- Dilawar Hussain Khan, father and guru of Chajjoo Khan, Nazeer Khan, and Khadim Hussain Khan
- Chhajjoo Khan, son and disciple of Dilawar Hussain Khan; also learned from Inayat Hussain Khan of Rampur-Sahaswan gharana
- Nazeer Khan (d. 1920), son and disciple of Dilawar Hussain Khan; also learned from Inayat Hussain Khan of Rampur-Sahaswan gharana
- Khadim Hussain Khan, son and disciple of Dilawar Hussain Khan; also learned from Inayat Hussain Khan of Rampur-Sahaswan gharana.
- Anjanibai Malpekar (1883–1974), disciple of Ustad Nazeer Khan
- Aman Ali Khan (1888–1953), son and disciple of Chajjoo Khan
- Shahmir Khan (sarangiya), disciple of Chajjoo Khan, Nazeer Khan, and Khadim Hussain Khan
- Kader Baksh (sarangiya), disciple of Chajjoo Khan, Nazeer Khan, and Khadim Hussain Khan
- Chand Khan, disciple of Chajjoo Khan, Nazeer Khan, and Khadim Hussain Khan
- Mamman Khan, disciple of Chajjoo Khan, Nazeer Khan, and Khadim Hussain Khan
- Zande Khan, disciple of Chajjoo Khan, Nazeer Khan, and Khadim Hussain Khan
- Miyan Jaan, disciple of Chajjoo Khan, Nazeer Khan, and Khadim Hussain Khan
- Wadilal Shivram, disciple of Chajjoo Khan, Nazeer Khan, and Khadim Hussain Khan

=== 20th century ===
- Muhammed Hussain Khan (1907–1988), disciple of Aman Ali Khan
- Pandurang Amberkar (1914–2002), disciple of Aman Ali Khan
- Begum Akhtar (1914-1974), disciple of Anjanibai Malpekar; more associated with Kirana gharana
- Naina Devi (1917-1993), disciple of Anjanibai Malpekar
- Shivkumar Shukla (1918–1998), disciple of Aman Ali Khan
- Sushila Rani Patel (1918-2014), disciple of Ramesh Nadkarni; more associated with Jaipur-Atrauli gharana
- Manna Dey (1919-2013), disciple of Aman Ali Khan
- Navrang Nagpurkar (1919–1998), disciple of Aman Ali Khan
- Vasantrao Deshpande (1920-1983), disciple of Aman Ali Khan
- Ramesh Nadkarni (1921–1995), disciple of Aman Ali Khan
- T. D. Janorikar (1921–2006), disciple of Aman Ali Khan
- Kumar Gandharva (1924-1992), disciple of Anjanibai Malpekar
- Lata Mangeshkar (1929-2022), disciple of Aman Ali Khan
- Jitendra Abhisheki (1929-1998), disciple of Navrang Nagpurkar; more associated with Jaipur-Atrauli gharana
- Kishori Amonkar (1932-2017), disciple of Anjanibai Malpekar; more associated with Jaipur-Atrauli gharana
- Asha Bhosle (1933-2026), disciple of Navrang Nagpurkar
- Mahendra Kapoor (1924-2008), disciple of Ramesh Nadkarni
- Suman Kalyanpur (1937-2026), disciple of Navrang Nagpurkar
- Dayanand Dev Gandharva (1943-2001), disciple of Shivkumar Shukla
- Pankaj Udhas (1951-2024), disciple of Navrang Nagpurkar
- Nisar Bazmi (1924-2007) Film music composer, disciple of Aman Ali Khan
- Wali Ahmed Khan, disciple of Aman Ali Khan
- Bigamurde Chaitanya Deva, disciple of Aman Ali Khan
- Shantilal (Harmonium), disciple of Aman Ali Khan
- Parshurambuwa Parsekar, disciple of Aman Ali Khan
- Mridungacharya Narayanrao Koli, disciple of Aman Ali Khan
- Sangeeta Pandharpurkar, disciple of Shivkumar Shukla
- Indira Thapa, disciple of Shivkumar Shukla
- Anil Vaishnav, disciple of Shivkumar Shukla
- Vasanti Sathe, disciple of Shivkumar Shukla
- Suresh Trivedi, disciple of Shivkumar Shukla
- Dwarakanath Bhonsle, disciple of Shivkumar Shukla
- Faiyyaz Khan, son and disciple of Muhammed Hussain Khan
- Jyoti Dhamdhere, disciple of Muhammed Hussain Khan
- Anupama Chandratreya, disciple of Muhammed Hussain Khan and T. D. Janorikar
- Kamal Naik, disciple of Ramesh Nadkarni
- Shaila Piplapure, disciple of Ramesh Nadkarni
- Meenaxi Mukherji, disciple of Ramesh Nadkarni
- Mahesh Babu, disciple of Ramesh Nadkarni
- Ramkishan Chandeshri, disciple of Ramesh Nadkarni
- Shailesh Mavinkurve, disciple of Ramesh Nadkarni
- Anuradha Marathe, disciple of T. D. Janorikar
- Kumudini Mundkur, disciple of T. D. Janorikar
- Sadhana Joshi, disciple of T. D. Janorikar
- Sharad Karmarkar, disciple of T. D. Janorikar
- Vasundhara Pandit, disciple of T. D. Janorikar
- Shrikant Pargaonkar, disciple of T. D. Janorikar
- Padmakar Kulkarni, disciple of T. D. Janorikar
- Neela Nagpurkar, disciple of Navrang Nagpurkar
- Upendra Kamat, disciple of Navrang Nagpurkar
- Mandakini Gadre, disciple of Navrang Nagpurkar
- Jagannath Prasad, disciple of Navrang Nagpurkar
- Shaila Pipalpure, disciple of Navrang Nagpurkar
- Pramila Datar, disciple of Navrang Nagpurkar
- Madhura Jasraj, disciple of Navrang Nagpurkar
- Mukund Vyas, disciple of Shivkumar Shukla
- Kiran Shukla, daughter and disciple of Shivkumar Shukla
- Neelam Shukla, daughter and disciple of Shivkumar Shukla
- Shakuntala Narsimhan, disciple of Ramesh Nadkarni
- Chintan Patel, disciple of Dayanand Dev Gandharva
- Matloob Hussain Khan (sitariya), descendant of Aman Ali Khan; disciple of N. R. Bhattacharya, Anil Dhar, Hafiz Ali Khan, and Amjad Ali Khan

=== Contemporary ===
- Suhasini Koratkar (1944-2017), disciple of T. D. Janorikar
- Shubha Joshi, disciple of Ramesh Nadkarni, Navrang Nagpurkar, and Pandurang Amberkar
- Kedar Bodas (1963-2023), disciple of T. D. Janorikar; more associated with Gwalior gharana
- Mohsin Ali Khan (sitariya), nephew and disciple of Matloob Hussain Khan.
- Anuradha Kuber, disciple of T. D. Janorikar
- Kishori Janorikar, daughter-in-law and disciple of T. D. Janorikar
- Mehtab Ali Niazi (sitariya) (b. 1997), son and disciple of Mohsin Ali Khan
