= Shree (Hindustani raga) =

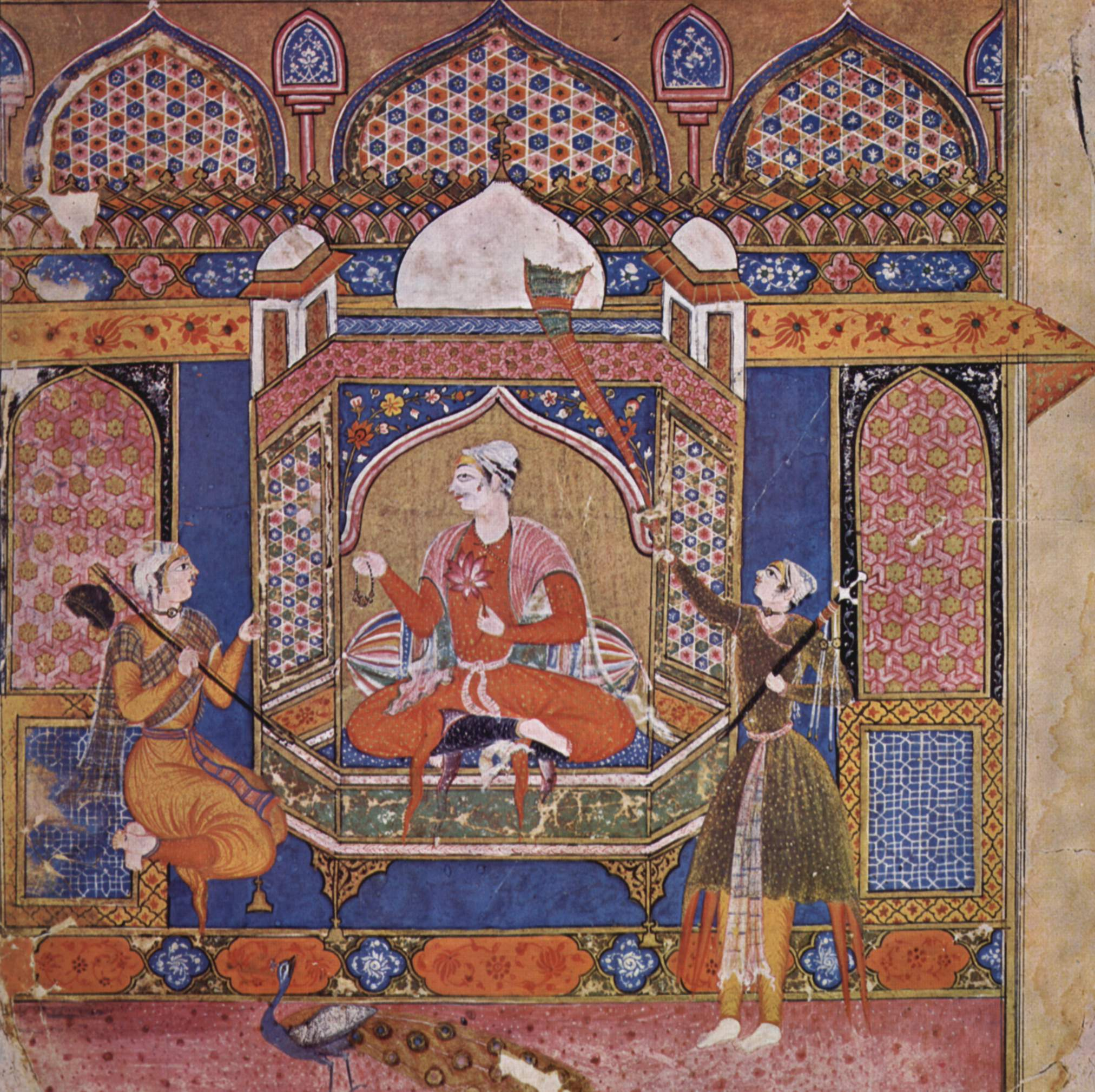
- Thaat: Poorvi
- Time of day: Early evening, after sunset
- Season: Winter
- Arohana: S Ṟ M̄ P N Ṡ; S Ṟ P, M P N Ṡ Ṟ Ṡ
- Avarohana: Ṡ N Ḏ P M̄ G Ṟ S
- Pakad: S, Ṟ Ṟ P, P M̄ G Ṟ ❟ Ṟ Ṟ ,S
- Vadi: Ṟ
- Samavadi: P
- Synonym: Shri

Shree is a very old North Indian raga of the Purvi thaat, and has traditionally been associated with Laxmi. It also appears in the Sikh tradition from northern India, and is a part of the Guru Granth Sahib, the holy text of the Sikhs. The Guru Granth Sahib composition comprises 31 ragas where Shree is the first raga to appear. The raga appears first on 14th page of the composition.

The basis of this Raag is steeped in the traditions of mainstream Indian Classical music. Siri Raag is serious and thought-provoking in its nature and creates an atmosphere where the listener is led to heed the advice given therein. The listener (the mind) is made aware of the truth of the message and with this ‘education’ is given the strength to face the future with both humility and the ‘gained’ knowledge.

Guru Nanak, Guru Amar Das, Guru Ram Das, and Guru Arjan have composed sacred hymns (Shabads) to be accompanied with this raga. It accompanies about 142 Shabads.

According to Indian classical vocalist Pandit Jasraj, Shree is "an evening raga, sung during the sunset. It is full of grace and majesty, and the main mood it creates is one of devotion and dedication."

== Film songs ==
=== Language : Hindi ===
Song	Movie	Composer	Singers
Prabhu Charanon Men	Andolan(1951 film)	Pannalal Ghosh	Parul Ghosh

=== Language : Kannada ===
Song	Movie	Composer	Singers
Hadonda Haaduve	Naandi (film)	Vijaya Bhaskar	P. B. Sreenivas

=== Language : Telugu ===
Song	Movie	Composer	Singers
Nelaraja Vennela raja	Malliswari (1951 film)	S. Rajeswara Rao	P. Bhanumathi

== See also ==
- Kirtan
