= Rajan and Sajan Mishra =

Indian Hindustani classical vocalists

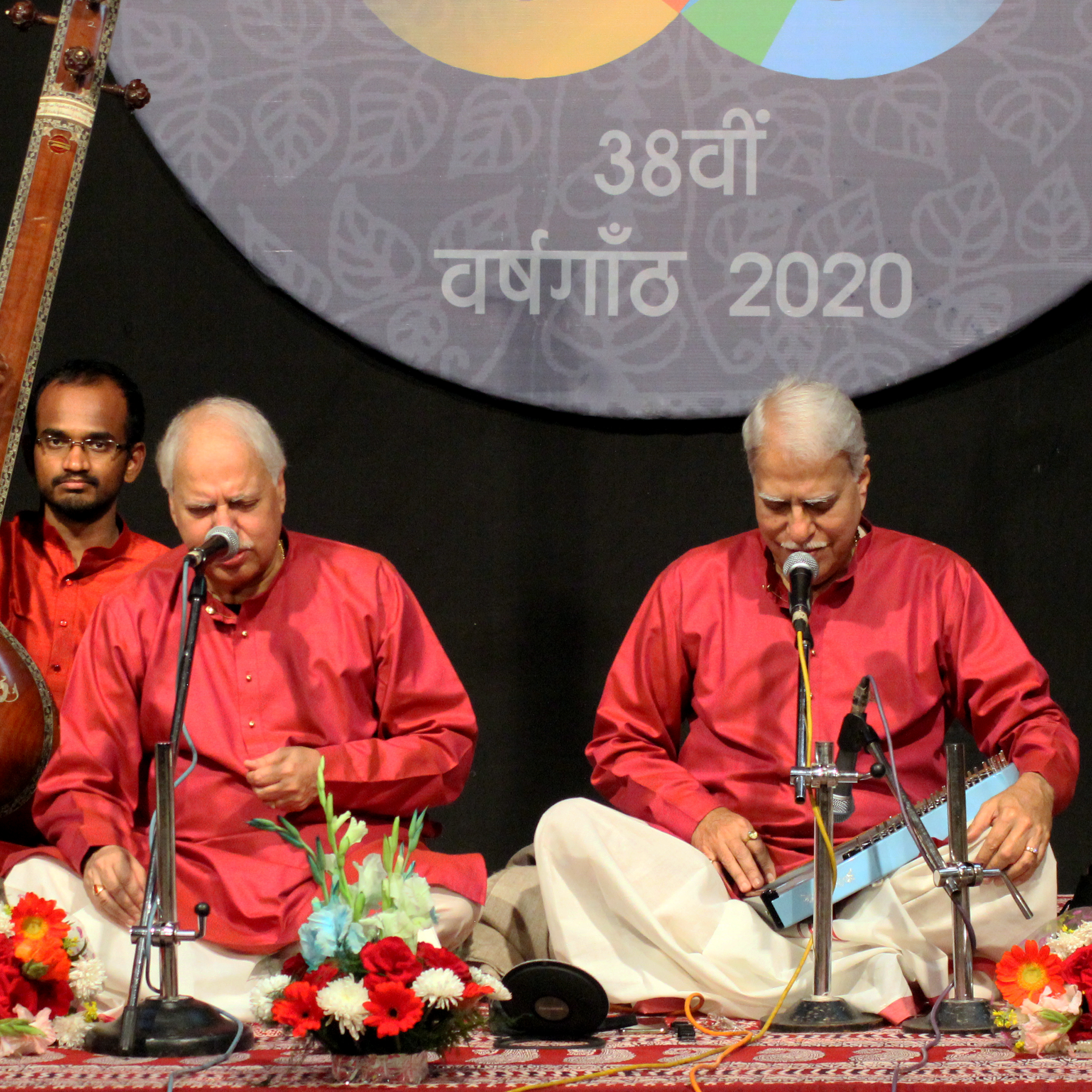
- Rajan and Sajan Mishra (2020)

Background information
- Genres: Hindustani Classical Music
- Members: Rajan Mishra; Sajan Mishra

Rajan and Sajan Mishra are brothers, singers of the khyal style of Indian classical music. They were awarded the Padma Bhushan in 2007, Sangeet Natak Akademi Award, jointly in 1998, the Gandharwa National Award for 1994–1995 and the National Tansen Samman 2011–2012 on 14 December 2012.

Rajan Mishra died on 25 April 2021, at St. Stephen's Hospital in New Delhi due to a heart attack caused by COVID-19 complications.

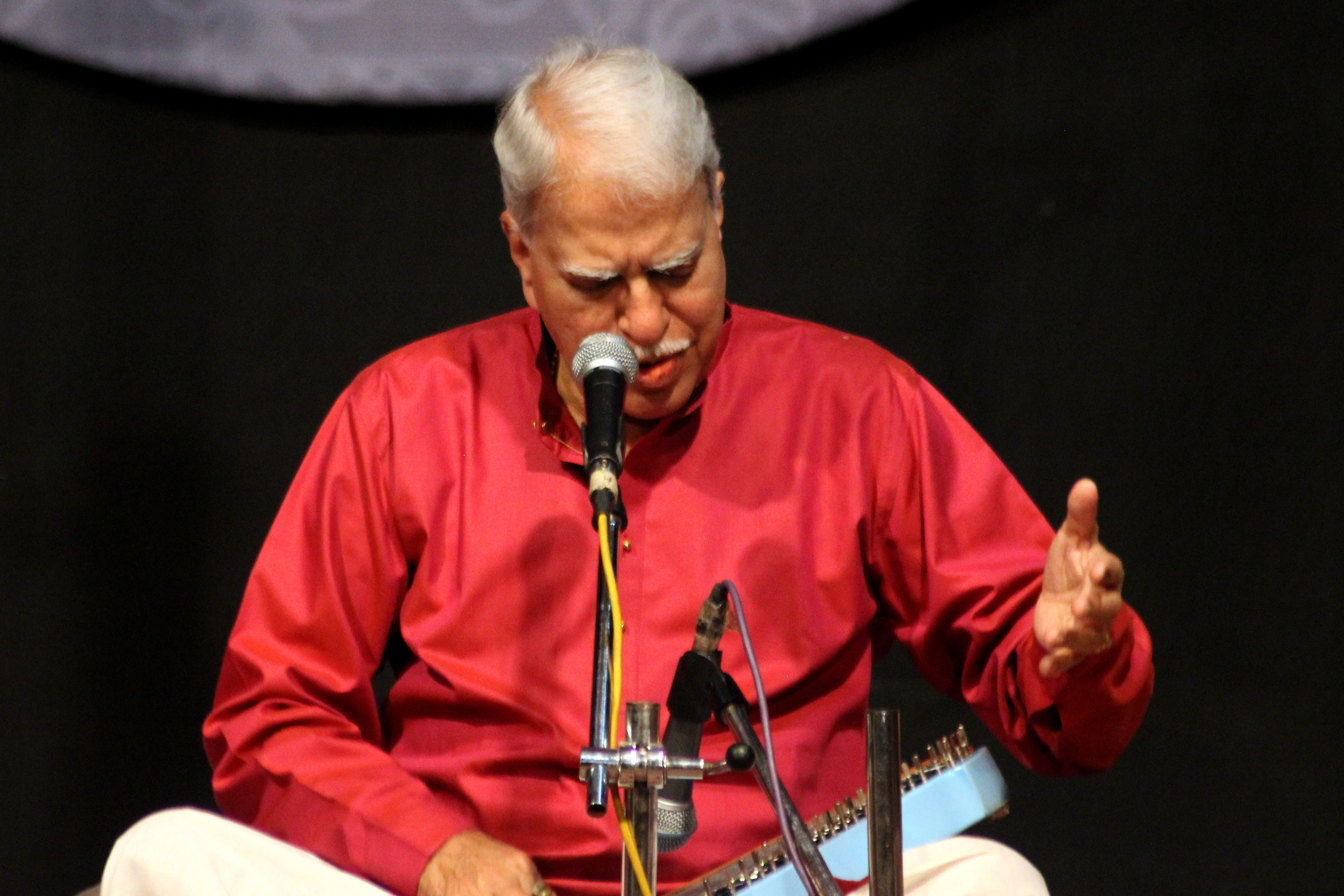
Pandit Rajan Mishra (2020)

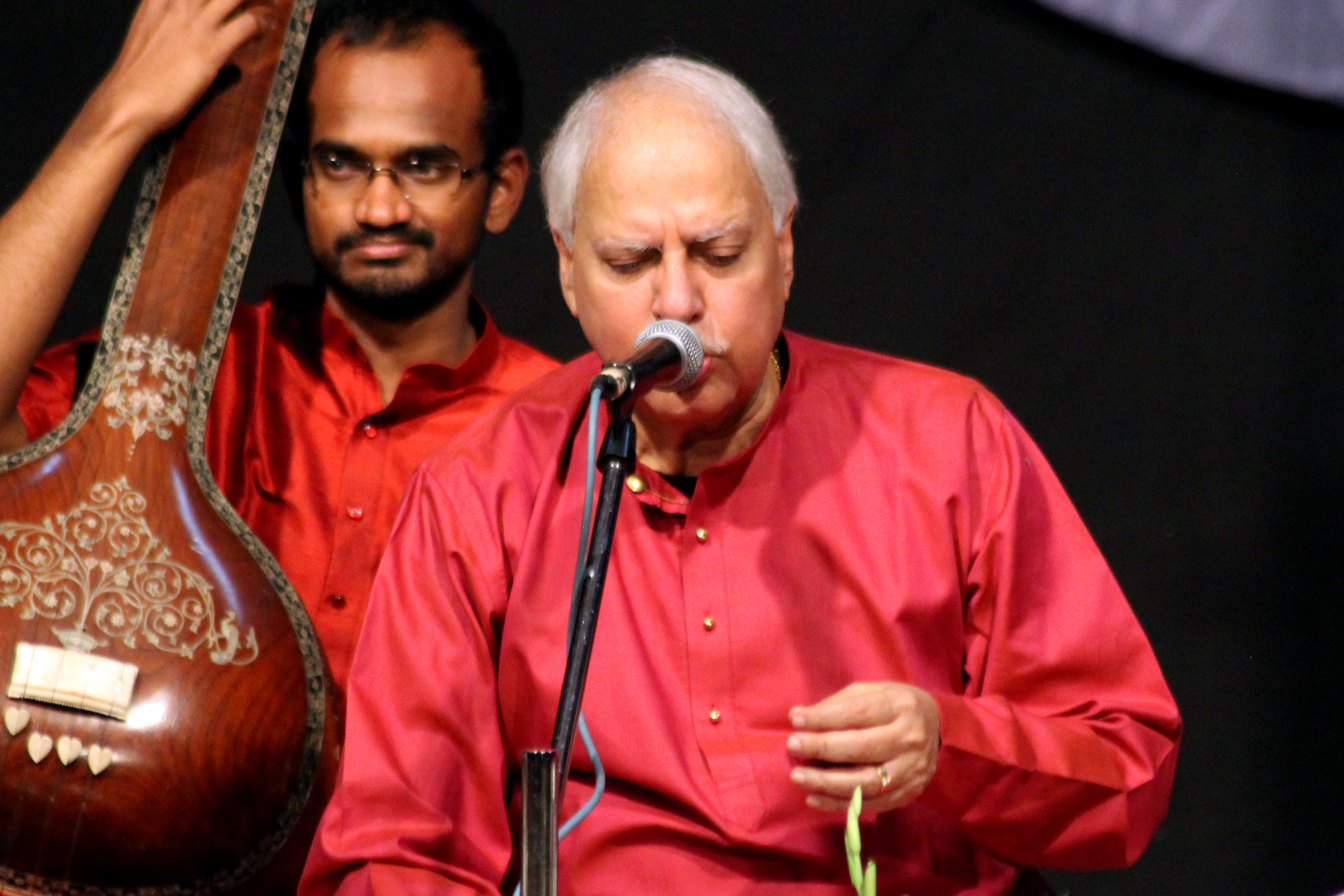
Pandit Sajan Mishra (2020)

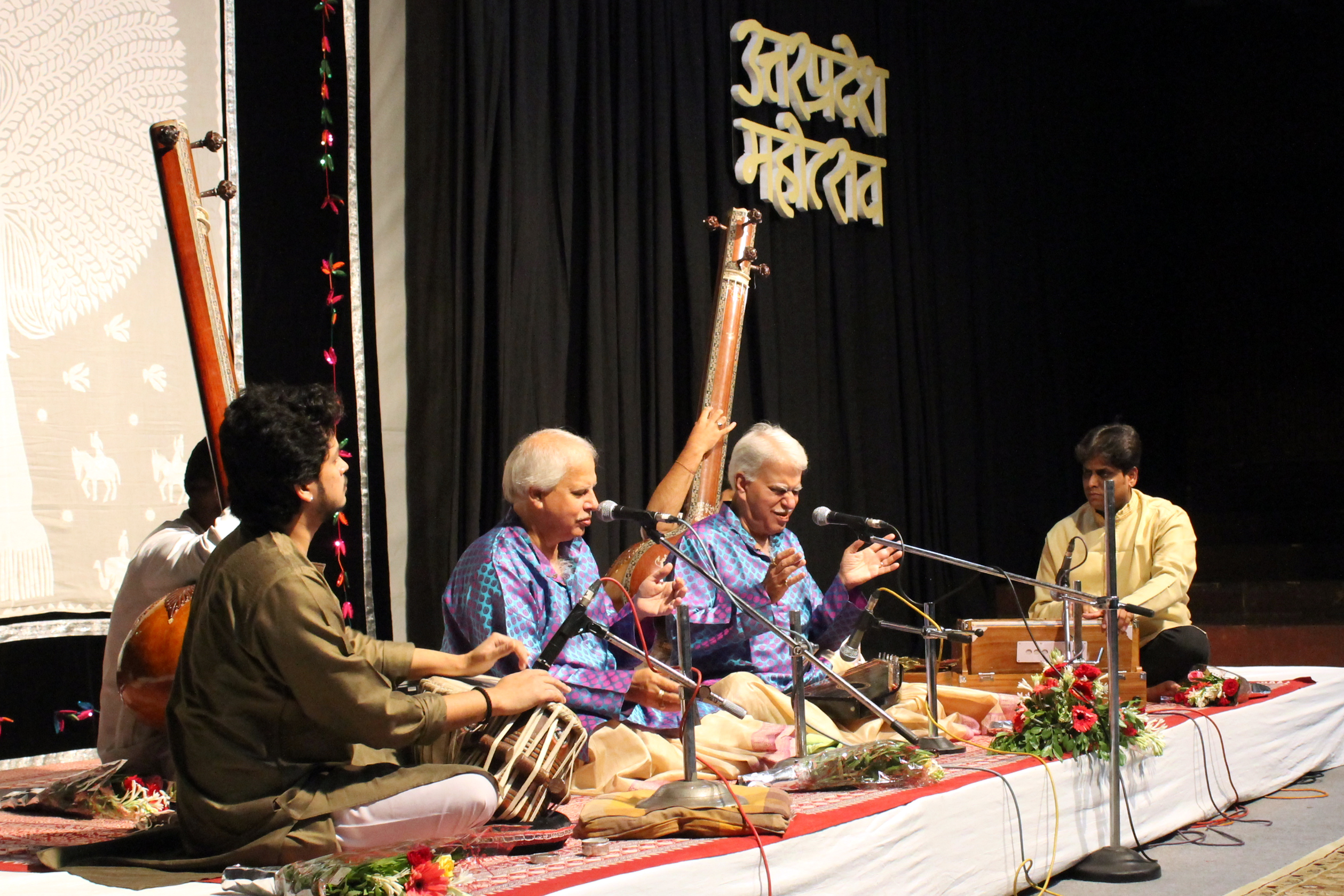
Rajan and Sajan Mishra performing at Bharat Bhavan Bhopal (July 2015)

== Early life ==
Rajan (1951–2021) and Sajan (born 1956) Mishra were born and brought up in Varanasi. They received their initial musical training from their grandfather's brother, Bade Ram Das Ji Mishra, and also their father, Hanuman Prasad Mishra, and from their uncle, sarangi virtuoso, Gopal Prasad Mishra, and started performing while they were still in their teens. They moved to Ramesh Nagar in Delhi, in 1977, where they continued to live.

== Career ==
Rajan and Sajan Mishra are part of a 300-year-old lineage of khyal singing of the Banaras Gharana. The Mishra brothers have been performing to audiences all over Indian and the world for many years.

They were both accountants in a small shop when they gave a performance in the presences of Satguru Jagjit Singh. The Satguru, realizing their talent, offered to pay double their living wages in exchange for them to put in more time to practise their vocals. They gave their first concert abroad in Sri Lanka in 1978, and soon they went on to perform in many countries across the world including, Germany, France, Switzerland, Austria, USA, UK, The Netherlands, USSR, Singapore, Qatar, Bangladesh and Oman.
