= Puriya =

- Thaat: Marwa
- Time of day: Just after sunset
- Arohana: N Ṟ G M̄ D N Ṟ Ṡ
- Avarohana: S N D M̄ G Ṟ S Ṇ; Ṟ N D M̄ G,M̄ G Ṟ S
- Vadi: G
- Samavadi: N

Puriya is a major hexatonic raga of Hindustani classical music.

Note emphasis: Ni, Ga, (Ma is an important pivot note.)

== Pakad or Chalan ==
Ni Ni Ni Ma, Ni Dha Ni

re Sa

Ma, (Ni) D (Sa) Ni (re) Sa () = grace note

Ni re Ga

Ni re Ga, Ga re Sa

Ni re Ma Ma Ga

Ma Dha Ni, Ma Dha, Ga Ma G

== Details ==
Raga properties
Property	Value
Thaat	Marwa
Ascending	N r G M D N r S
Descending	S N D M G r S N or r N D M Gg, M G r S
Samar (time of day)	Sunset or just after
Rasa	Shanti (equanimity/peace) Gambhir (seriousness)
Related ragas	Kanada, Hindol, Kalyan (Iman)
Jati/Type	Shadava-Shadava

== Sources ==
- Bor, Joep (c. 1997), The Raga Guide, Charlottesville, Virginia: Nimbus Records, archived from the original on 15 July 2009
