= Aman Ali Khan =

Indian singer (1888–1953)

Ustad Aman Ali Khan
- Born: 1888; Bhendi Bazaar, Bombay, British India
- Died: 11 February 1953 (aged 64–65) Delhi, India
- Genres: Hindustani classical music
- Occupations: Vocalist, Composer
- Years active: 1900s – 1953

Ustad Aman Ali Khan ‘Amar’ (1888–1953) was an Indian classical vocalist and composer from the Bhendi Bazaar gharana.

He brought many Carnatic ragas into Hindustani classical music.

== Career ==
Aman Ali Khan was born in 1888. Aman Ali Khan was the son of Chhajju Khan, one of the founders of the Bhendi Bazaar gharana, who came from Uttar Pradesh and settled in the Bhendi Bazaar area of Bombay.

Aman Ali Khan learned Carnatic music under the guidance of Kalanidhi Bidaram Krishnappa, court musician of Mysore state. He introduced rhythmic play (layakari) and style of solfa singing (sargam) to the Bhendi Bazaar gharana. Aman Ali's music was especially noted for its rhythmic sargam patterns, for which he derived inspiration from Carnatic music. The great vocalist Amir Khan considered Aman Ali Khan to be a major musical influence in his life.

== Death ==
Aman Ali Khan left Bombay in 1947 and settled in Pune. He contracted pneumonia while visiting Delhi for concerts and died on February 11, 1953.

His style influenced Amir Khan and Vasantrao Deshpande. His disciples include Shivkumar Shukla, T. D. Janorikar, Muhammed Hussain Khan, playback singers Manna Dey and Lata Mangeshkar, music director Nisar Bazmi, Wali Ahmed Khan, B. Chaitanya Dev and harmonium player Shantilal.
