= Purvi =

Raga in Hindustani classical music

Purv Purvi
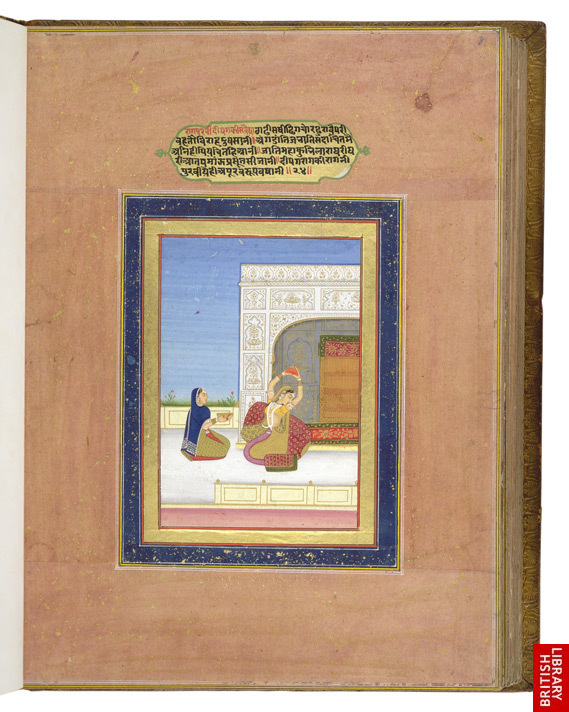
- Thaat: Poorvi
- Type: Sampurna-Sampurna Vakra
- Time of day: 4th Prahar of the day (3pm-6pm)
- Arohana: Ṇ Ṟ G M̄ P Ḏ N Ṡ
- Avarohana: Ṡ N Ḏ P M̄ G M G Ṟ S
- Pakad: S Ṟ G M̄ G M G M̄ Ḏ P N Ḏ P G M̄ P M̄ G M G Ṟ S
- Chalan: S Ṟ G M̄ G M G M̄ Ḏ P N Ḏ P G M̄ P M̄ G M G Ṟ S
- Vadi: G
- Samavadi: N

Purvi or Poorvi (IAST: Pūrvī) is a raga in Hindustani classical music that exemplifies its own thaat, the Poorvi thaat. Purvi has a deeply serious, quiet and somewhat mystical character. It is uncommon in performances nowadays.

== Aroha & Avaroha ==
Arohana: Ṇ Ṟ G M̄ P Ḏ N Ṡ

Thus: C D♭ E F♯ G A♭ B C+

In German: C Des E Fis G Aes H C+

In Arohana, S and P are often avoided, specially in fast taans.

Avarohana: Ṡ N Ḏ P M̄ G M G Ṟ S

== Vadi & Samavadi ==
Vadi : Ga

Samvadi : Ni

== Pakad or Chalan ==
S Ṟ G M̄ G M G M̄ Ḏ P N Ḏ P G M̄ P M̄ G M G Ṟ S

== Organization & Relationships ==
Thaat: Purvi is the main raga of Purvi Thaat.

== Samay (Time) ==
4th Prahar of the day (3pm-6pm)

== Film Songs ==
=== Language: Hindi ===
Song	Film	Composer	Singer	Lyricist
Bahut Shukriya Badi Meherbani	Ek Musafir Ek Hasina	O. P. Nayyar	Mohammed Rafi & Asha Bhosle	S. H. Bihari

=== Language: Tamil ===
Song	Movie	Composer	Singer
Amba Manamkanindhu	Sivakavi	Papanasam Sivan	M. K. Thyagaraja Bhagavathar
Yezhu Swarangalukul(Ragamalika with Sindhubairavi, khamboji)	Apoorva Raagangal	M. S. Viswanathan	Vani Jairam
Neerada Neram	Vaira Nenjam	M. S. Viswanathan	Vani Jairam
Arpudha Kalaidhan	Idhaya Nayagan	Deva	Vani Jairam
Intha Nimisham	Hello (1999 film)	Deva	Hariharan, K.S. Chitra
Thenthoovum Vasandham	Vaidehi Kalyanam	Deva	Mano, K.S. Chitra
Rojavai Thaalattum	Ninaivellam Nithya	Illayaraja	S. P. Balasubrahmanyam, S. Janaki
Kaadhal Ennum Kaaviyam	Vattathukkul Chaduram	Illayaraja	Jikki
Piraye Piraye	Pithamagan	Illayaraja	Madhu Balakrishnan
Om Sivoham	Naan Kadavul	Illayaraja	Vijay Prakash
Ninnaichcharan Adainthen	Bharathi	Illayaraja	Bombay Jayashree
Yenna Varam Vendum	Nandhavana Theru	Illayaraja	Mano, Lekha, Sindhu Devi
Sree Ramavaarai	Sri Rama Rajyam	Illayaraja	Chinmayi, Sakyath
Nalam Paaduven	Kanmaniye Pesu	Raveendran	S. Janaki
Hai Rama	Rangeela	A. R. Rahman	Hariharan, Swarnalatha
Athini Sithini	Thenali	A. R. Rahman	Hariharan, Chitra Sivaraman, Kamal Haasan
Macha Machiniye	Star	A. R. Rahman	Unni Menon
Oh Nenjame	Paasakanal	S. A. Rajkumar	K. J. Yesudas, Sunandha
Adi kadhal Enpathu	Ennavalle	S. A. Rajkumar	Hariharan
En Vanam Neethana	Dhinamdhorum	Oviyan	S. P. Balasubrahmanyam, Shenoy Balesh
Or Aayiram Yaanai	Nandhaa	Yuvan Shankar Raja	P. Unnikrishnan
Amma Endralle	Nandhaa	Yuvan Shankar Raja	Illayaraja
Poovum Malarnthida	Swarnamukhi	Swararaj	S. P. Balasubrahmanyam, Swarnalatha
Kangal Theduthey	Manathodu Mazhaikalam	Karthik Raja	Sadhana Sargam, Jassie Gift
Or Mirugam	Paradesi	G. V. Prakash Kumar	V. V. Prasanna, Pragathi Guruprasad

== Related Ragas ==
Puriya Dhanashree

== Rasa ==
Raga-Kalpadruma: Charming and beautiful, scantily dressed, lotus-eyed Puravi appears at the end of the day. Idle and sleepy, she suffers from the pangs of separation and dreams only of her lover.

Cattvarimsacchata-Raga-Nirupanam: Master of archery, seated on an elephant and dressed in white, Purvika has a splendid body and is served by all the different varnas.

Raga-Sagara: I remember Purvika dressed in a garment woven with threads of gold. Fair and charming like the moon, she holds a cup of wine and a parrot in her hands and she is served by women who are graceful and lively like the young deer. The head of her lover rests in her lap.

== Historical Information ==
Poorvi is an old traditional raga, which originated in the eastern part of India. Its ancient precursor Purvagauda had a similar scale to modern Bhairav (S r G m P d N). Poorvi itself does not appear in the literature before the 16th century. It is one of the 14 original composition of the legend Tansen.

== Literature ==
Bor, Joep (c. 1997), The Raga Guide, Charlottesville, Virginia: Nimbus Records, archived from the original on 15 July 2009
Kaufmann, Walter (1968), The Ragas of North India, Calcutta: Oxford and IBH Publishing Company.
Bhatkhande, Vishnu Narayan (1968–73), Kramika Pustaka Malika, Hathras: Sangeet Karyalaya.
Bhatkhande, Vishnu Narayan (1968–75), Sangeet Shastra, Hathras: Sangeet Karyalaya.
Rao, B.Subba (1964–66), Raganidhi, Madras: Music Academy.
Ratanjankar, S.N., Abhinava Gita Manjari, Bombay: Popular Prakashan.
Khan, Raja Nawab Ali (1968–78), Mariphunnagatama, Hathras: Sangeet Karyalaya.
