= Jaijaivanti =

Raga in Hindustani classical music

- Thaat: Khamāj
- Type: Sampoorna
- Time of day: Midnight
- Season: Vasani
- Arohana: S R G M G R, M P N Ṡ
- Avarohana: Ṡ Ṉ D P M G R G̱ R S
- Pakad: R G̱ R S, Ṇ S Ḍ Ṇ R
- Vadi: Re (poorvanga vadi)
- Samavadi: Pa
- Equivalent: Jijavanthi
- Similar: Gara

Jaijaivanti or Jaijaiwanti is a Hindustani classical raga belonging to Khamaj Thaat. According to the Guru Granth Sahib, this raga is a mixture of two others: Bilaval and Sorath. The raga appears in the latter section in Gurbani, as only four hymns were composed by Guru Tegh Bahadur, the ninth Sikh guru. These hymns were added by his son and successor Guru Gobind Singh in 1705 A.D. This raga is not mentioned in any Indian classical scriptures on music nor in the Ragmala.

According to Guru Granth Sahib, Jaijaivanti (ਜੈਜਾਵੰਤੀ) expresses the feeling of happiness and satisfaction of achievement, while simultaneously conveying the sadness of losing. An apt simile for this Raag is that of a king winning a battle, however, he is then told that his son has perished on the battlefield. This Raag conveys a sense of having to put duty first. The duality of the emotions of joy and sorrow prevents overreacting to good or bad news. Raga Jaijaiwanti bears the closest resemblance to raga: Gara.

== Composition ==
=== Aaroh ===
S R G M G R, M P N Ṡ

=== Avroh ===
Ṡ Ṉ D P M G R G̱ R S

=== Pakad ===
R G̱ R S, Ṇ S Ḍ Ṉ̣ R

It is classified as a "Paramel Praveshak Raga", i.e. a raga that has the characteristics of a particular mela or thaat and that has additional notes that allow it to qualify under another mela or thaat. Jaijaivanti has both Shuddha Ga and Komal Ga. It also has Shuddha Ni and Komal Ni usage as well. If more stress or focus is put on the Shuddha Ga and Ni notes, the raga shows the characteristics of the Khamaj thaat. Whereas if more focus is applied to the Komal Ga and Komal Ni notes in the same raga, the characteristics of the Kafi Thaat are highlighted.

=== Possible notes ===
Ni Sa Dha Ni (komal) Re, Re Ga (komal) Re Sa.
Pa Re Ga (komal) Re Sa, Ma Pa Ni (shuddha) Re (tar saptak) Ni (komal) Dha Pa, Dha Ma Ga Re, Re Ga (komal) Re Sa.

== In Carnatic music ==
Jaijaivanthi :

ārohanam : S, D₂ N₂ R₂, R₂ G₃ M₁ P M₁ G₃ M₁ G₃ R₂, R₂ M₁ P *N₃ Ṡ

avarohanam : Ṡ N₂ D₂ P D₂ M₁ G₃ M₁ R₂*G₂ R₂ S, N₃*S D₂ N₂ R₂ S

It is a janya ragam of the 28th melakarta ragam Harikambhoji.

Jeeva swaram : R₂ and P

Anya swaram : G₂* and N₃*

Dwijavathi :

ārohanam : S R₂ M₁ G₃ M₁ P D₂ Ṡ

avarohanam : Ṡ N₂ D₂ P M₁ G₃ M₁ R₂*G₂ R₂ S N₂ D₂ N₂ S

Jeeva swaram : R₂ and M₁

Anya swaram : G₂*

It is a janya ragam of the 28th melakarta ragam Harikambhoji. It is also known as Jujāvanti (formerly)/Dwijavanthi(modern name)(pronounced Dvijāvanti) in the Carnatic tradition and in the Yakshagana theatre tradition. It is said to have been borrowed by Muthuswami Dikshitar from Hindustani music into Carnatic, who then composed his famous Kritis, Akilandeswari Rakshamam and Chetah Sri Balakrishnam Bhajare. It rubs shoulders with Sahana(carnatic), in certain phraseology. Desh ang or Sorath ang is not used in dwijavanti.There is absolutely no use or very less use of N₃* {Kakali nishadam(carnatic)/Shuddh nishad(Hindustani)}. Rendition of Dwijavanti is usually done with incorporating shades of Sahana and Bageshri and with its signature phrase : M₁ G₃ M₁ R₂ G₂ R₂ S.

=== Compositions ===
- Chetah Sri Balakrishnam Bhajare and Akilandeswari Rakshamam by Muthuswami Dikshitar
- Ramachandrudithadu by Annamacharya
- Prasanna Gopalakrishnam by Oothukkadu Venkata Kavi
- Taruni Njan(Padam) by Maharaja Swathi Thirunal
- Kumara Gurupara(Thiruppugazh) by Arunagirinathar tuned by Dr. Lalgudi Jayaraman
- Ninnai Paadi by Papanasam Dr. Rukmini Ramani

== Film songs ==
=== Language : Hindi ===
Song	Movie	Composer	Singers
Mausam Suhana Dil Hai Deewana	Suvarna Sundari	P. Adinarayana Rao	Lata Mangeshkar
Yeh Dil Ki Lagi Kam Kya Hogi	Mughal-e-Azam	Naushad	Lata Mangeshkar
Zindagi Aaj Mere Nam Se Sharamati Hai	Son of India (1962 film)	Naushad	Mohammad Rafi
Bairan Ho Gai Raina	Dekh Kabira Roya	Madan Mohan	Manna Dey
Manmohana Bade Jhuthe	Seema (1955 film)	Shankar–Jaikishan	Lata Mangeshkar
Suni Suni Saaj Ki Sitar Par	Lal Patthar	Shankar–Jaikishan	Kishore Kumar
Dil Deta Hai Ro Ro Duhai	Phir Teri Kahani Yaad Aayee	Anu Malik	Alka Yagnik
Main Radha Tu Sham	Vishwaroop	Shankar–Ehsaan–Loy	Shankar Mahadevan & Kamal Haasan
Baapu Sehat Ke Liye	Dangal (film)	Pritam	Sarwar Khan & Sartaz Khan

=== Tamil ===
Song	Movie	Composer	Singer
"Enathullamae"	Meera	S. V. Venkatraman	M. S. Subbulakshmi
"Amutha Tamizhil"	Madhuraiyai Meetta Sundharapandiyan	M. S. Viswanathan	P. Jayachandran, Vani Jairam
"Bombay Theme"	Bombay	A. R. Rahman	Theme- Orchestra
"Anbae Sughama (Sahana Traces)"	Paarthale Paravasam	A. R. Rahman	Srinivas, Sadhana Sargam
"Mannapenin Sathiyam"	Kochadaiiyaan	A. R. Rahman	Haricharan, Latha Rajinikanth
"Mazhai Mega Vanna" (Charanam only)	Desam	A. R. Rahman	K. S. Chitra, Srinivas
"Mouname Paarvayai"	Anbe Sivam	Vidyasagar	S. P. Balasubrahmanyam, Chandrayee
"Poi Solla Kudathu"	Run	Vidyasagar	Hariharan
"Mukundha Mukundha"(Ragam Kapi toches also)	Dasavathaaram	Himesh Reshammiya	Sadhana Sargamam
"Unnai Kaanadhu Naan"	Vishwaroopam	Shankar–Ehsaan–Loy	Shankar Mahadevan
"Rukku Rukku Rukku" (traces of Sahana)	Avvai Shanmugi	Deva	kamalahasan

=== Language : Telugu ===
Song	Movie	Composer	Singers
Nee Needalona Nilichenuraa	Suvarna Sundari	P. Adinarayana Rao	P. Susheela
Kanavera Muni Raja	Panduranga Mahatyam	T. V. Raju	P. Leela
Himagiri Sogasulo	Pandava Vanavasam	Ghantasala (musician)	Ghantasala (musician) & P. Susheela
Manasuna Manasai	Doctor Chakravarty	S. Rajeswara Rao	Ghantasala (musician)
Vadasi Yadi Kinchidapi Priye Chaaruseele	Bhakta Jayadeva	S. Rajeswara Rao	Ghantasala (musician)
Ee Mooga Choopela	Gaali Medalu	T. G. Lingappa	Ghantasala (musician) & Renuka
Aadave andala surabhamini	Yamagola	K. Chakravarthy	S. P. Balasubrahmanyam

=== Language : Urdu ===
Song	Movie	Composer	Singers
"Dil Ka Diya Jalaya"	Koel (film)	Khwaja Khurshid Anwar	Noor Jehan

== Albums ==
=== Tamil ===
Song	Album	Composer	Singer
"Yayum Nyayum Yarakiyaro"	Sandham- Symphony Meets Classical Tamil	Raleigh Rajan	Karthik, Pragathi Guruprasad
"Unnai Konjum Neram"	Unnai Konjum Neram - Single	Sanjay Ramakrishnan - Vijay Veerapandiyan	Sreekanth Hariharan, Amirt K Narayan

=== Urdu ===
- Ghazal: "Ghuncha-e-Shoq, Laga Hai Khilnay" (Singer: Ustad Mehdi Hasan, Notes: Re ga (komal) Re Sa Ma)
- Ghazal: "Dost Ban Kar Bhi Nahin" (Singer: Ustad Ghulam Ali)

=== Malayalam ===
- "Oruneram Enkilum" (Singers: Yesudas, Chitra)

== Performance ==
"Jaijaivanti" is sung during the first prahar of the night—from 6:00 to 9:00 pm. It is generally recited in the summer or grishma. "Jaijaivanti" is sung by 2 aangs, i.e. the Desh aang and the Bageshri aang.
