= Bhairav (raga) =

Hindustani raga

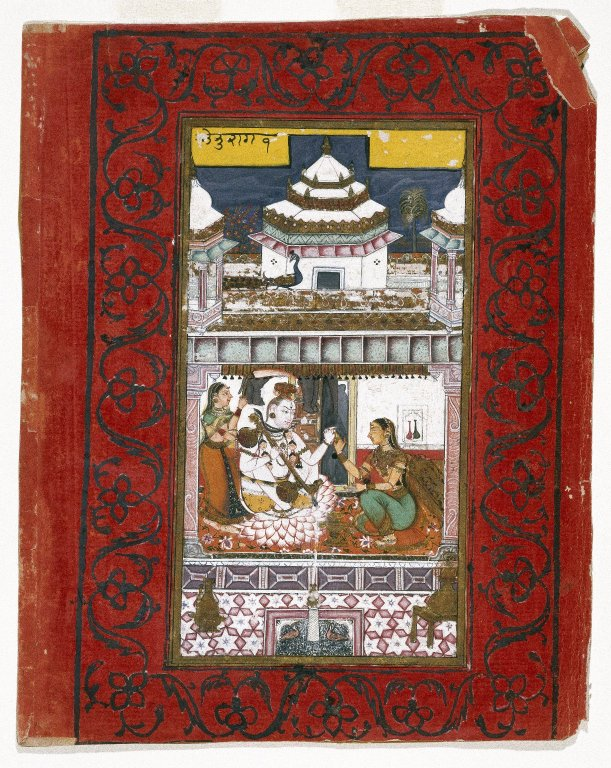
- Thaat: Bhairav
- Type: Sampurna
- Time of day: Daybreak; Beginning of concerts (Sunrise)
- Arohana: Sa Re Ga Ma Pa Dha Ni Sa'
- Avarohana: Sa' Ni Dha Pa Ma Ga Re Sa
- Pakad: Ga Ma Dha Dha Pa, Ga Ma Re Re Sa
- Chalan: Sa Ga Ma Pa Dha Dha Pa Ma Ga Ma Re Sa
- Vadi: Dha
- Samavadi: Re
- Equivalent: Mayamalavagowla; Double harmonic scale
- Similar: Kalingda; Gauri; Ahir Bhairav; Nat Bhairav Ramkali

Bhairav is a Hindustani classical raga of Bhairav thaat. It is a sampurna raga that is traditionally performed in the morning and also as the beginning piece in concerts. It is the defining raga of its own thaat.

Raga Kalingda in Hindustani and Ragam Mayamalavagowla in Carnatic music have the same scale as Raga Bhairav, although the moods they create can be quite different due to the way they are expounded.

According to Indian classical vocalist Pandit Jasraj, Bhairav is a "morning raga, and solemn peacefulness is its ideal mood." It is grave in mood and suggests seriousness, introversion and devotional attitude.

== History ==
Bhairav raga is held to be many centuries old. The origin of Bhairav raga is disputed. According to some musicians, Bhairav raga was the first raga that originated from the mouth of Lord Shiva. While some musicians argue that Bhairav raga originated from the mouth of Lord Surya. This is why it was sung in the daytime. Bhairava is one of the names of Shiva especially in his powerful form as a meditative ascetic with matted locks and body smeared with ashes. The ragas too have some of these masculine and ascetic attributes in their form and compositions.

The Bhairav raga allows a large number of note combinations and a range of emotional qualities from valor to peace. There are many variations based on it, including Ahir Bhairav, Alam Bhairav, Anand Bhairav, Bairagi Bhairav, Mohini Bhairav Beehad Bhairav, Bhavmat Bhairav, Devata Bhairav, Gauri Bhairav, Hijaz Bhairav, Shivmat Bhairav, Nat Bhairav, Bibhas, Ramkali, Gunkali, Zeelaf, Jogiya (raga), Saurashtra Bhairav, Bangal Bhairav, Komal Bhairav, Mangal Bhairav, Kaushi Bhairav, Bhatiyari Bhairav, Beehad Bhairav, Virat Bhairav, Kabiri Bhairav, Prabhat Bhairav, Roopkali, Bakula Bhairav, Hussaini Bhairav, Kalingda, Devaranjani, Asa Bhairav, Jaun Bhairav, and Bhairav.

== Theory ==
Bhairav is grave in mood and suggests seriousness, introversion as well as devotional attitude. It shares its notes with Ahir Bhairav which has a sombre temperament.

Arohana : Sa Re Ga Ma Pa Dha Ni Sa'

Avarohana : Sa' Ni Dha Pa Ma Ga Re Sa

Vadi : Dha

Samavadi : Re

Pakad : Ga Ma Dha Dha Pa, Ga Ma Re Re Sa

Chalan : Sa Ga Ma Pa Dha Dha Pa Ma Ga Ma Re Sa

=== Organisation and relationships ===
Related ragas:

- Ahir Bhairav
- Bairagi Bhairav
- Bibhas
- Gunkali
- Jogiya (raga)
- Mohini Bhairav
- Nat Bhairav
- Ramkali
- Zeelaf

== Behaviour ==
The performance for this raga is solemnly serious. The raga comes across as a musical entity with mood of meditation, philosophical depth, and emotional richness.

=== Samay (time) ===
Bhairav is an early morning (pratham prahar) raag.

=== Seasonality ===
Bhairav is one of few ragas that can be sung in any season.

=== Rasa ===
Bhairav is typically performed with a peaceful, serious, and serene mood. In classical Hindustani language, its rasa is "Shaant aur Gambhir".

== Film songs ==
Bhairav is a popular raga for film songs. Here are some film songs based on Bhairav:

- "Amma Roti De Baba Roti De" – Sansar, 1952
- "Hanse Tim Tim" – Sanskar, 1952
- "Mohe Bhul Gaye Sanvariya" – Baiju Bawra, 1952
- "Jaago, Mohan Pyare Jaago" – Jagte Raho, 1956
- "Ae Malik Tere Bande Hum" – Do Aankhen Barah Haath, 1957
- "Man Re Hari Ke Gun Ga" – Musafir, 1957
- "Meri Veena Tum Bin Roye" – Dekh Kabira Roya, 1957
- "Kehe Do Koi Na Kare Yahan Pyaar" – Goonj Uthi Shehnai, 1959
- "Poochho Na Kaise Maine Rain Bitaayi"– Meri Surat Teri Ankhen, 1963
- "Waqt Karta Jo Wafa" – Dil Ne Pukara, 1967
- "Ek Ritu Aye Ek Ritu Jaye" – Gautam Govinda, 1979

== Sources ==
- Bor, Joep; Rao, Suvarnalata (1999). The Raga Guide: A Survey of 74 Hindustani Ragas. Nimbus Records with Rotterdam Conservatory of Music. p. 32. ISBN 978-0-9543976-0-9.
- Bhairav Rāga (Hin), The Oxford Encyclopaedia of the Music of India. Oxford University Press. ISBN 978-0-19-565098-3.
