= Ramkali =

Hindustani raga

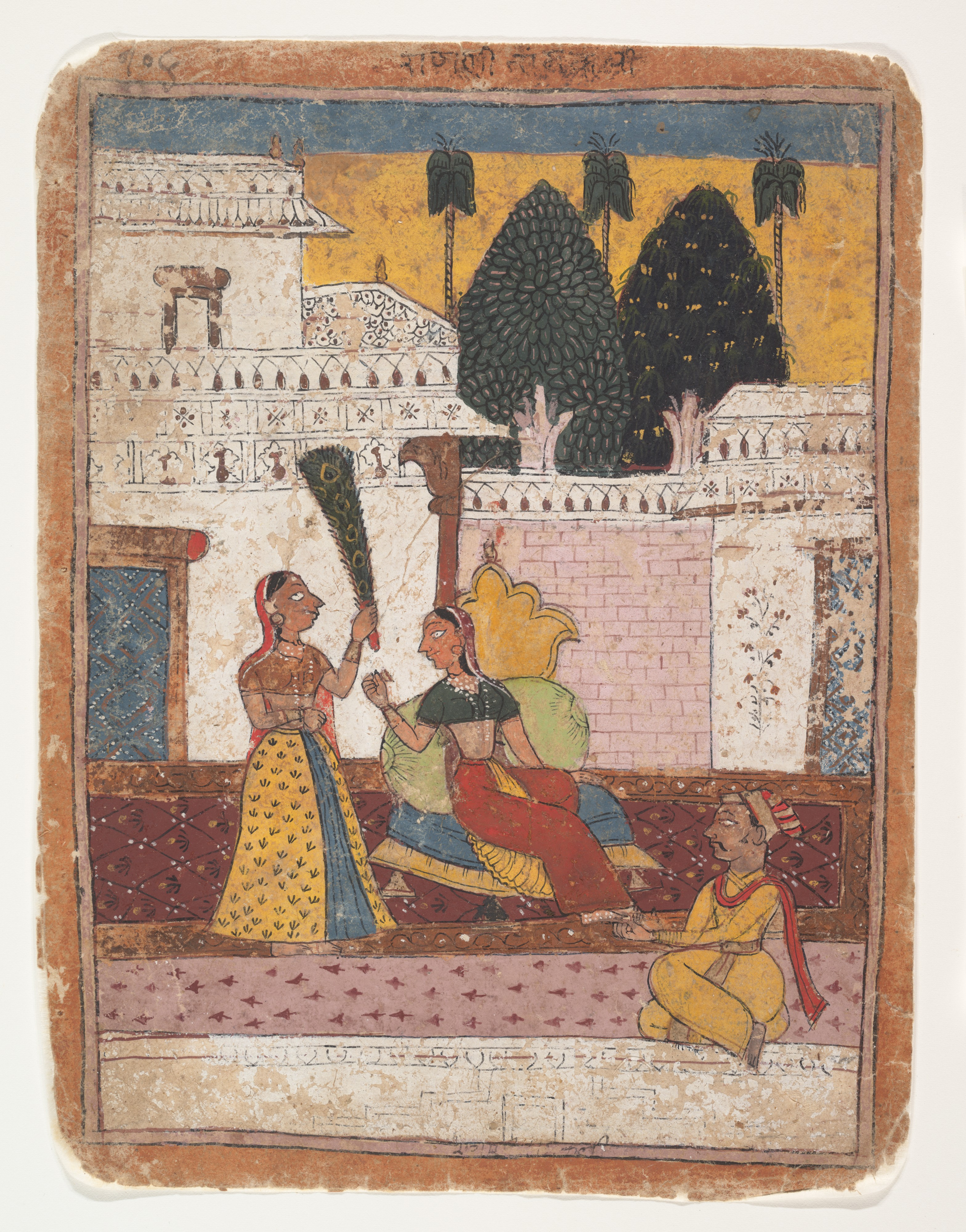
- Thaat: Bhairav
- Type: Sadava-Sampurna
- Time of day: (6 am to 9 am): 1st Prahar of the Day
- Arohana: S G M P Ḏ N Ṡ
- Avarohana: Ṡ N Ḏ P M̄ P Ḏ Ṉ Ḏ P M̄ P G M Ṟ S
- Pakad: M̄ P Ḏ Ṉ Ḏ P ; M̄ P G M Ṟ S
- Chalan: M̄ P Ḏ Ṉ Ḏ P ; M̄ P G M Ṟ S
- Vadi: Pa
- Samavadi: Sa
- Synonym: Ramakri

Raga Ramkali is a raga in Hindustani classical music and can be themed around soothing things a man would say to please a discontent wife, it is an early morning raga belonging to Bhairav Thaat. In this raga, as in Bhairav, Rishabh and Dhaivat are Komal(flat), but the Teevra and the flat nishad are added. The vadi-samvadi are Pancham and Shadja. The aroha is S r G M P, G M d N S' and the avroha is S' N d P m P, d (N)d P, G M r S. Flat nishad (seventh degree) and sharp madhyama (fourth degree) are used often.

Ramkali also appears in Sikh tradition in North India and is a part of Sikh Scripture Sri Guru Granth Sahib Ji. Another form of this Raga present in Sri Guru Granth Sahib Ji is 'Raga Ramkali Dakhni'.

== Theory ==
=== Arohana and avarohana ===
Arohana: S G M P Ḏ N Ṡ

Avarohana: Ṡ N Ḏ P M̄ P Ḏ Ṉ Ḏ P M̄ P G M Ṟ S

Vadi : Pa

Samavadi : Sa

Pakad/Chalan : M̄ P Ḏ Ṉ Ḏ P ; M̄ P G M Ṟ S

== Description ==
This raag is very similar to Raga Bhairav. Rishabh and Dhaivat are less oscillating in Raag Ramkali than in Bhairav. This Raga is sung in middle and upper octave, which discriminates it from Bhairav.

In Ramkali, Teevra Madhyam and Komal Nishad are used in a specific combination in Avroh like: M̄ P Ḏ Ṉ Ḏ P ; G M Ṟ S. Generally, Rishabh is skipped in Aaroh like: Ṉ̣ S G M P.
