= Jhinjhoti =

Raga Jhinjhoti
- Thaat: Khamaj
- Type: Shadav-Sampurna Vakra
- Time of day: 2nd Prahar of the night
- Arohana: S R M P D Ṡ
- Avarohana: Ṡ Ṉ D P M G R G S
- Pakad: Ḍ S R M G R G S R Ṉ̣ Ḍ P̣ Ḍ S P̣ Ḍ S R G M G M G R S R Ṉ̣ Ḍ S
- Chalan: Ḍ S R M G R G S R Ṉ̣ Ḍ P̣ Ḍ S P̣ Ḍ S R G M G M G R S R Ṉ̣ Ḍ S
- Vadi: G
- Samavadi: Ṉ
- Equivalent: Khambavati

Jhinjhoti is a Hindustani classical raga from the Khamaj Thaat. This is a light and playful raga.

== Theory ==
Aarohana

S R M P D Ṡ

Avaroha

Ṡ Ṉ D P M G R G S

Pakad / Chalan

Ḍ S R M G R G S R Ṉ̣ Ḍ P̣ Ḍ S P̣ Ḍ S R G M G M G R S R Ṉ̣ Ḍ S

Vadi

Ga

Samavadi

Ni

== Raga description ==
This is a light and playful Raga, apt for instrumental music. In this Raga mostly light mood Bandishs are rendered. In Carnatic raga Yadukulakamboji is a close relative, sharing the same notes.

== Songs in this Raga ==
A famous rendition of this raga is Abdul Karim Khan's Thumri "Piya Bin Nahi Aavat Chain" which Bhimsen Joshi had heard as a child and which left a lasting impression on him.

Gulon mein rang bhare, a ghazal by Faiz Ahmad Faiz, sung by Mehdi Hassan, is set to Jhinjhoti.

== Film Songs ==
=== Language : Telugu ===
Song	Movie	Composer	Singers
Padamani Nannadaga Thaguna	Doctor Chakravarty	S. Rajeswara Rao	P. Susheela
