= Tilak Kamod =

Hindustani classical raga

- Thaat: Khamaj
- Time of day: Late night, 12–3
- Arohana: 'P 'N S R G S R M P N S'
- Avarohana: S' P D M G S R G S 'N 'P 'N S R G S
- Pakad: 'P 'N S R G S R P M G S 'N
- Vadi: R
- Samavadi: P
- Similar: Desh

Tilak Kamod is a Hindustani classical raga.

== Origin ==
The raga emerges from Khamaj thaat.

== Technical description ==
The raga is of Shadava-Sampoorna nature, i.e., in its arohana (ascent) six notes are used (D is excluded), whereas the avarohana (descent) uses All seven notes. All the swaras used in this raga are shuddha except for N which is sometimes komal (n). The usage of komal (n) brings in the characteristics of Khamaj thaat. However, shuddha N in the avarohana is quite frequently used in North Indian style of performing this raga.

Arohana: 'P 'N S R G S R M P N S' .

Avarohana: Sa' Pa Dha Ma Ga Sa Re Ga Sa 'Ni 'Pa 'Ni Sa Re Ga Sa .

Pakad:'Pa 'Ni Sa Re Ga Sa Re Pa Ma Ga Sa 'Ni

The vadi swar is Re, and the samavadi is Pa .

== Samay (Time) ==
The raga is to be sung during the second quarter of the night (dwitiya prahar).

== Further information ==
It is a very melodious raga, and whereas heavy classical genres like Khyals are often based on this raga, light classical genres are more popular in Tilak Kamod. Rarely, a tinge of Komal Ni is also used in this raga. The raga is very close to ragas like Desh, and hence requires a skilful rendition for the differences to be distinct to the listener.

== Film songs ==
=== Language : Hindi ===
Song	Movie	Composer	Singers
Badariya Baras Gayi Us Paar	Moorti	Bulo C Rani	Mukesh, Khursheed Bano, Hamida Banu
Hiya Jarat Rahat Din Rain	Godaan	Ravi Shankar	Mukesh
Teri Yaad Dil Se Bhulane	Hariyali Aur Rasta	Shankar–Jaikishan	Mukesh
Ham Tere Pyar Mein	Dil Ek Mandir	Shankar–Jaikishan, Hasrat Jaipuri	Lata Mangeshkar
Ho Gaye Do Rooj	Pyaar Ka Saagar	Ravi	Mukesh
Tumhare Bin Ji Na Lage Gharmen	Bhumika	Vanraj Bhatia	Preeti Sagar
Hamne Tujhko Pyar Kiya Hai Jitna	Dulha Dulhan	Kalyanji–Anandji	Mukesh
Mujhe Mil Gayi Hai Mohabat	First Love	Dattaram Wadkar	Mukesh
Chali Re Chali Re Mai To Des Paraye	Saranga	Sardar Malik	Asha Bhosle
Tilak Kamod	Khuda Kay Liye	Ahmed Jahanzeb	Ahmed Jahanzeb
Aaoge Jab Tum	Jab We Met	Sandesh Shandilya	Rashid Khan

=== Language : Telugu ===
Song	Movie	Composer	Singers
Veena Padave Ragamayi	Sita Rama Kalyanam	Gali Penchala Narasimha Rao	P. Susheela
Theliyani Aanandham	Mangalya Balam	Master Venu	P. Susheela
