= Hindol =

Hindustani classical raga

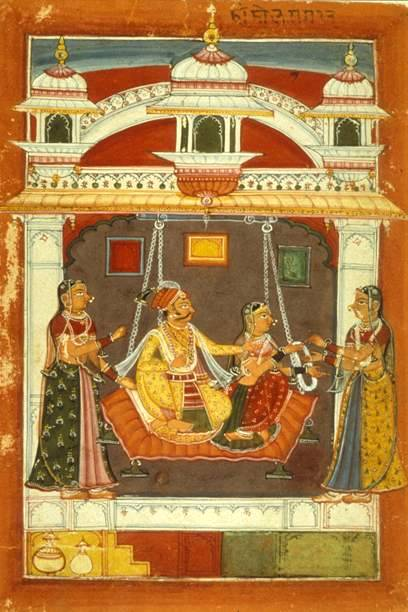
- Thaat: Kalyan
- Type: Audava
- Time of day: After midnight / Early morning (12 Night – 3 AM)
- Season: Spring
- Arohana: S G M D N M D S'
- Avarohana: S' N D M G M G S D S
- Pakad: D D N M D S' ; D M G ; S ,D ,D S
- Chalan: D D N M D S' ; D M G ; S ,D ,D S
- Vadi: Dha
- Samavadi: Ga

Hindol is a Hindustani classical raga from the Kalyan Thaat.

According to Indian classical vocalist Pandit Jasraj, Hindol is an ancient raga associated with the spring season and is sung during the first part of the day.

== Origin ==
The raga emerges from Kalyan Thaat. It is an ancient raga associated with the spring season.

== Technical description ==
=== Arohana ===
The Arohana has 7 notes.

Sa Ga Ma# Dha Ni Dha Sa.

=== Avarohana ===
The Avarohana has five notes.

Sa Ni Dha Ma# Ga Sa.

Re and Pa are not used. The only Teevra note used is Ma (henceforth represented by Ma#). All other swaras are shuddha.

=== Pakad ===
Sa Ga Ma# Dha Ni Dha Ma# Ga Sa.

The vadi swara is Dha, and the samvadi is Ga.

=== Jati ===
Audhva – Audhav

== Samay (time) ==
The raga is to be sung or played on an instrument such as veena, sitar, sehnai, flute, etc., during the first part of the day.

== Further information ==
The raga has Teevra Madhyam at its heart, and revolves around that note, resting on Dha or Ga. A prominent movement in Hindol is the gamak, heavy and forceful oscillations particularly using Ma# and Dha. Its structure and phrasing is the imitation of a swing, hence the name Hindol (Hindola means swing). The Ni in the avarohana is very weak, and in most compositions, it is used obliquely or often entirely avoided. The mostly pure classical genre of music like Khayals or Dhamars are composed in this raga.

== Sources ==
- Sound of India, The Best Reference Site for Indian Classical Music
- The Raga Guide – Hindol
