= Desh (raga) =

Hindustani raga

- Thaat: Khamaj
- Type: Audava-sampurna
- Time of day: Late night, 12–3
- Arohana: Ni Sa Re, Ma Pa Ni, Sa
- Avarohana: Sa ni Dha, Pa Dha Ma Ga Re, Pa Ma Ga, Re Ga Ni Sa
- Pakad: Re, Ma Pa Ni, Sa Re ni Dha Pa, ma Ga Re
- Vadi: Re
- Samavadi: Pa
- Synonym: Khamaj
- Similar: Sarang; Sorath

Desh or Des is a Hindustani classical music raga which belongs to the Khamaj thaat. This raga is very similar to raga Khamaj.

== Technical description ==
The raga is of audava-sampurna nature, i.e., in its arohana (ascent) only five notes are used, whereas the avarohana (descent) uses all the seven notes. Shuddha Ni is used in the arohana, while Komal Ni (represented as ni below) is used in avarohana. All other swaras are shuddha.

- Arohana: Ni Sa Re, Ma Pa Ni, Sa.
- Avarohana: Sa ni Dha, Pa Dha Ma Ga Re, Pa Ma Ga, Re Ga Ni Sa.
- Pakad: Re, Ma Pa Ni, Sa Re ni Dha Pa, ma Ga Re
- The vadi swara is Re

The ascent in this raga is a step by step pentatonic movement which goes like this: Sa, Re, Ma Pa, Ni Sa’.

Samayam (Time): The raga is to be sung during the second quarter of the night (9PM to 12AM).

Re is very prominent, quite a few times the singer rests on Re, making it a centre to the melody. The Meend from Ma to Re via Ga is one of the most vital features of the raga. The arohana via shuddha Ni, and the transition from Re to komal Ni in the avarohana form an important part of the melodies in this raga. Further, Desh is quite close to neighboring ragas like Tilak Kamod, and hence requires skillful rendition to separate itself.

== Prominent Songs ==
Desh has been used in a few patriotic compositions. Vande Mataram, the national song of India, is the most well-known. The popular old Doordarshan video Baje Sargam, that featured many respected Indian classical singers, is also based on Desh.

=== Rabindrasangeet based on the raga Desh ===
The polymath and Nobel laureate, Rabindranath Tagore, had very often used Hindustani Classical Music and Carnatic Classical Music in his songs (Rabindrasangeet). The songs based on this raga Des are listed below:

- Aachhe Tomar Bidye Sadhhi
- Aaj Taaler Boner Karotaali
- Aaji Mor Dware Kahar
- Aamader Sokhire Ke Niye
- Aamar E Ghore Aaponar
- Aamar Je Sob Dite Hobe
- Aamar Satya Mithya Sakoli
- Aami Jene Shune Bish
- Aar Rekho Na Aandhare
- Anek Diner Aamar Je Gaan
- Anek Kotha Bolechilem
- Animesh Aankhi Sei Ke De
- Dekhaye De Kotha Aachhe
- Dhoroni Dure Cheye Keno
- Dnaarao Maatha Khaao
- Duare Dao More Rakhia
- E Bharote Raakho Nityo
- Ebaar Bujhi Bholar Bela
- Ebaar To Jouboner Kachhe
- Ebaar Ujaar Kore Lowo He
- Ei Lobhinu Songo Tabo
- Ei Shrabon Bela Badol Jhora
- Emon Dine Taare Bola Jaay
- Eso Aamar Ghore
- Eso Shyamalosundaro
- Gagoner Thale Robi Chandra
- Gahonraate Shrabondhara
- Garob Mamo Horechho Prob
- Haay Ke Dibe Aar Santona
- Hey Bidesi Eso Eso
- Jaag Jaag Re Jaag Sangeet
- Je Din Sakol Mukul
- Jeyo Na Jeyo Na Phire
- Jhore Jaay Ure Jaay Go
- Jodi Holo Jaabar Kshon
- Keno Raaja Daakis Keno
- Knaadale Tumi More
- Knaapiche Deholota
- Kotha Hote Baaje Prembedona
- Kothaay Aalo Kothaay Ore
- Kshomite Parilam Na Je
- Naa Naa Kaaj Nai Jeyo Naa
- Ogo Sundar Ekada Ki Jaani
- Probhu Khelechhi Aanek
- Puruser Bidya Korechinu
- Se Aase Dhire
- Shrabano Borisano Paar
- Shrabonmegher Aadhek
- Sokhi Lo Sokhi Lo
- Taai Tomar Ananda Aamar
- Taare Dekhate Paari Ne
- Tomari Tore Maa Sopinu
- Toper Taper Baadhon Katu
- Tumi Chhere Chhile Bhule
- Utol Dhara Badol Jhore

== Carnatic Compositions ==
- Nanda Nandana by Lalita Dasar (pen name of T. G. Krishna Iyer)
- Vikasita Pankaja by Kalyani Varadarajan
- Vithala Salaho Swami by Purandara Dasa
- Thunbam Nergayil by Bharathidasan
- Thillana by Dr. Lalgudi Jayaraman
- Rama namame by Thanjavur shankara iyer
- kamalanane kamade by R.K.Shiramkumar
- tumhi shankar tumhi ram by Mangalam Ganapathy

== Film Songs ==
=== Language: Tamil ===
Song	Movie	Composer	Singer
Premayil yavum Marandenae	Sakuntalai	Thuraiyur Rajagopala Sharma	M. S. Subbulakshmi, G. N. Balasubramaniam
Mangiyathor Nilavinile	Thirumanam	S. M. Subbaiah Naidu, T. G. Lingappa	T.M.Soundararajan
Sindhu Nadhiyin	Kai Koduttha Dheivam	Viswanathan–Ramamoorthy	T.M.Soundararajan, L.R.Eswari & J.V.Raghavulu
Thunbam Nergaiyil Yaazhedutthu	Or Iravu	Bharathidasan, Dandapani Desikar, R. Sudarsanam	M. S. Rajeswari, V. J. Varma
Gopiyar Konjum Ramana	Thirumal Perumai	K. V. Mahadevan	T. M. Soundararajan
Naan Unnai Ninaikkaatha	Paavai Vilakku	K. V. Mahadevan	P. Susheela
Ondra Iranda	Selvam	K. V. Mahadevan	T. M. Soundararajan, P. Susheela
Androru Naal	Nadodi	M. S. Viswanathan	T. M. Soundararajan, P. Susheela
Idhuthan Mudhal Rathiri	Oorukku Uzhaippavan	M. S. Viswanathan	K.J. Yesudas, Vani Jairam
Muththamizhil Paada	Melnaattu Marumagal	Kunnakudi Vaidyanathan	Vani Jairam
Vizhiyil Pudhu Kavithai	Theertha Karaiyinile	Ilaiyaraaja	Mano, K. S. Chithra
Onakena Thaane Innerama	Ponnu Oorukku Pudhusu	Ilaiyaraaja	Ilaiyaraaja, Sarala
Poonguyil Ponmalaiyil	Thazhuvatha Kaigal	Ilaiyaraaja	S. Janaki
Kanner Thuzhi	Raja Kaiya Vacha	Ilaiyaraaja	K. J. Yesudas
Deivangal	Pudhiya Raagam	Ilaiyaraaja	Mano, S. Janaki
Orancharam(charanam only)	Kakkai Siraginilae	Ilaiyaraaja	S. P. Balasubrahmanyam
Kanave Kalaiyadhe	Kannedhirey Thondrinal	Deva	P. Unnikrishnan, K. S. Chithra
Indhu Maha Samudrame (Ragamalika:Desh, Sahana)	Mannava	Deva	Hariharan, K. S. Chithra
Nilladi Endradhu	Kaalamellam Kaathiruppen	Deva	S. P. Balasubrahmanyam, K. S. Chithra
Itho Intha Nenjodu	Good Luck	Manoj Bhatnaghar	S. P. Balasubrahmanyam, K. S. Chithra
Malare Maranthuvidu	Penngal	Bharadwaj	K. S. Chithra
Adi Kadhal Oru Kannil	Doubles	Srikanth Deva	P. Unnikrishnan, Harini
Kadhal Vandicho	Yai! Nee Romba Azhaga Irukke!	Raaghav-Raja	Shankar Mahadevan
Kandupidi Kandupidi	Samudhiram	Sabesh–Murali	Hariharan, Ganga
Noothana	Karka Kasadara	Prayog	Harish Raghavendra, Chinmayi
Ulagil Yentha Kathal	Naadodigal	Sundar C Babu	Hariharan
Kalathara	Vegam	Rajhesh Vaidhya	P. Unnikrishnan, Anuradha Sekhar
Maruvaarthai	Enai Noki Paayum Thota	Darbuka Siva	Sid Sriram
Varalaama(also Kedaragowla)	Sarvam Thaala Mayam	Rajiv Menon(Orchestration by A. R. Rahman)	Sriram Parthasarathy
Mannamaganin Sathiyam(Dwijavanthi traces)	Kochadaiiyaan	A. R. Rahman	Haricharan, Latha Rajinikanth
Singappenney(Female portion only)	Bigil	A. R. Rahman	A. R. Rahman, Shashaa Tirupati
Alli Arjuna(Ragamalika)	Kaaviya Thalaivan	A. R. Rahman	Haricharan, Bela Shende, Srimathumitha
Yethanai Yethanai	Ji	Vidyasagar	Shankar Sampoke
Naana Yaar Idhu	Ninaithu Ninaithu Parthen	Joshua Sridhar	Sadhana Sargam
Naanaagiya Nadhimoolamae	Vishwaroopam II	Ghibran	Kamal Haasan, Kaushiki Chakraborty, Master Karthik Suresh Iyer
Pen Maegam Polavae(charanam only)	Kathai Thiraikathai Vasanam Iyakkam	Sharreth	G. V. Prakash Kumar, Saindhavi
Neelorpam	Indian 2	Anirudh Ravichander	Abby V, Shruthika Samudhrala

=== Other languages ===
Year	Song	Movie	Language of Movie	Composer	Singer
1979	Sanware Ke Rang Ranchhi	Meera	Hindi	Ravi Shankar	Vani Jairam
2003	Enthe Innum Vanneela	Gramophone	Malayalam	Vidyasagar	P. Jayachandran , Jeemon KJ, Chorus
2001	Megharagam	Kakkakkuyil	Malayalam	Deepan Chatterjee	K.S. Chithra
1998	Mayilay Parannu Va	Mayilpeelikkavu	Malayalam	Berny–Ignatius	K.J. Yesudas & K.S. Chitra (Duet Version)
1965	Aap Ko Pyar Chhupane	Neela Aakash	Hindi	Madan Mohan	Asha Bhosle & Mohammed Rafi
1994	Mora Saiyan To Hai Pardes	Bandit Queen	Hindi	Nusrat Fateh Ali Khan	Nusrat Fateh Ali Khan
1964	Gori Tore Nainwa	Main Suhagan Hoon	Hindi	Lacchiram Tamar	Asha Bhosle & Mohammed Rafi
1956	Thandi Thandi Savan Ki Phuhar	Jagte Raho	Hindi	Salil Chowdhury	Asha Bhosle
1967	Oru Pushpam Mathramen	Pareeksha	Malayalam	M.S. Baburaj	K.J. Yesudas
2002	Sarfaroshi Ki Tamanna Ab Hamare	The Legend of Bhagat Singh	Hindi	A. R. Rahman	Sonu Nigam
2015	Agar Tum Saath Ho	Tamasha	Hindi	A.R. Rahman	Alka Yagnik, Arijit Singh
1952	Door Koi Gaaye	Baiju Bawra	Hindi	Naushad	Shamshad Begum, Mohammed Rafi, & Lata Mangeshkar
1963	Hum Tere Pyar Mein Sara	Dil Ek Mandir	Hindi	Shankar–Jaikishan	Lata Mangeshkar
1994	Pyar Hua Chupke Se	1942: A Love Story	Hindi	R. D. Burman	Kavita Krishnamurthy
2015	Man Mandira	Katyar Kaljat Ghusali	Marathi	Pandit Jitendra Abhisheki	Shankar Mahadevan
