= Gauri (raga) =

Type of melody in Indian music

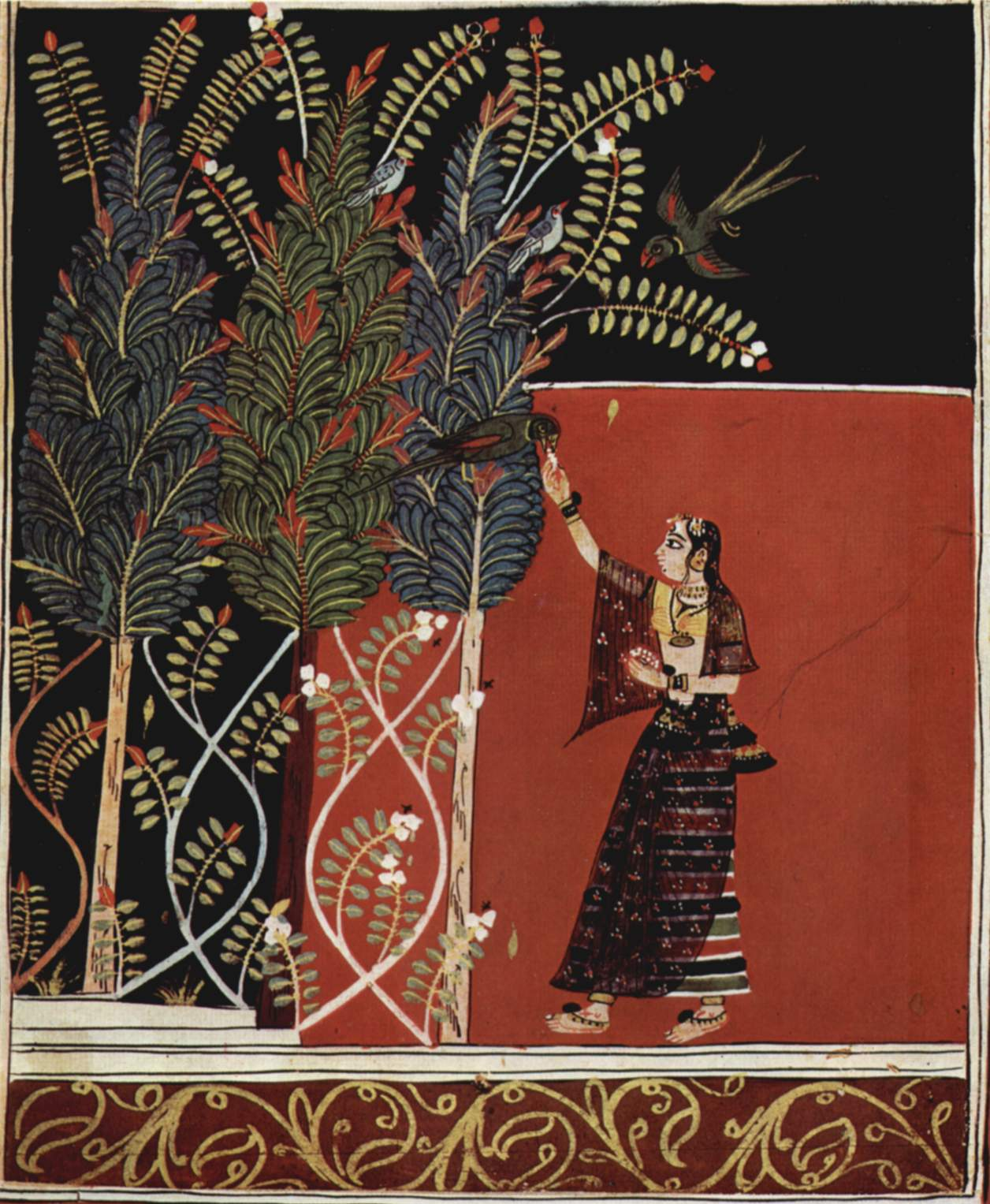
- Thaat: Bhairav
- Pakad: S, N’ N’ S, r G, r S r N’, N’ d’ N’, N’ S
- Chalan: S, N’ N’ S, r G, r S r N’, N’ d’ N’, N’ S

Gauri is an India musical raga that appears in the Sikh tradition from northern India and is part of the Sikh holy scripture called Sri Guru Granth Sahib. Every raga has a strict set of rules which govern the number of notes that can be used, which notes can be used, and their interplay that has to be adhered to for the composition of a tune. There are Gouris of the Bhairav, Poorvi and Marwa thats with additional qualifiers such as the Shree-anga Gouri, Bhairav-anga Gouri, Poorvi-anga Gouri and so on. These are not considered ‘big’ ragas.

In the Guru Granth Sahib, the Sikh holy Granth (book), there are a total of 60 raga compositions and this raga is the third raga to appear in the series. The composition in this raga first appear on ang (page) no. 151.

Raag Gauri (ਗਉੜੀ)—Gauri creates a mood where the listener is encouraged to strive harder in order to achieve an objective. However, the encouragement given by the Raag does not allow the ego to increase. This, therefore, creates the atmosphere where the listener is encouraged but still prevented from becoming arrogant and self-important.

== Variants ==
Gauri was used by Guru Nanak, Guru Amar Das, Guru Ram Das, Guru Arjan and Guru Tegh Bahadur. Several forms of Gauri Raga exist historically, and this probably accounts for the large number of variants:

- Gauri (Bhairav thaat)
- Gauri (Kalingada aang) (2 M's)
- Gauri (Marwa aang)
- Gauri Bairagan
- Gauri Basant
- Gauri Chayti
- Gauri Cheti
- Gauri Dakhani
- Gauri Deepaki
- Gauri Guarairi
- Gauri Majh
- Gauri Mala
- Gauri Malva
- Gauri Purbi
- Gauri Purbi Deepaki
- Gauri Sorath

== Composition of the raga ==
- Aroh: Sa Re Ga Re Ma Pa Ni Sa
- Avroh: Sa Ni Dha Ma Pa, Dha Pa Ma Ga, Ga Re Sa Ni Sa
- Vadi: Re
- Samvadi: Pa

Occasionally Re is performed with a vibrato, as in Siri Raga, which has the same vadis. Ni is given prominence through either stopping or lingering on this note.

This raga is associated with Bhairav thaat. But it is played in various angs (forms) :

- Gauri (Bhairav thaat)
- Gauri (Kalingada aang) (2 M's)
- Gauri (Marwa aang).

== See also ==
- List of Ragas in Hindustani classical music
- Kirtan
- Sukhmani Sahib
