= Tilang =

Janya raga of Carnatic music

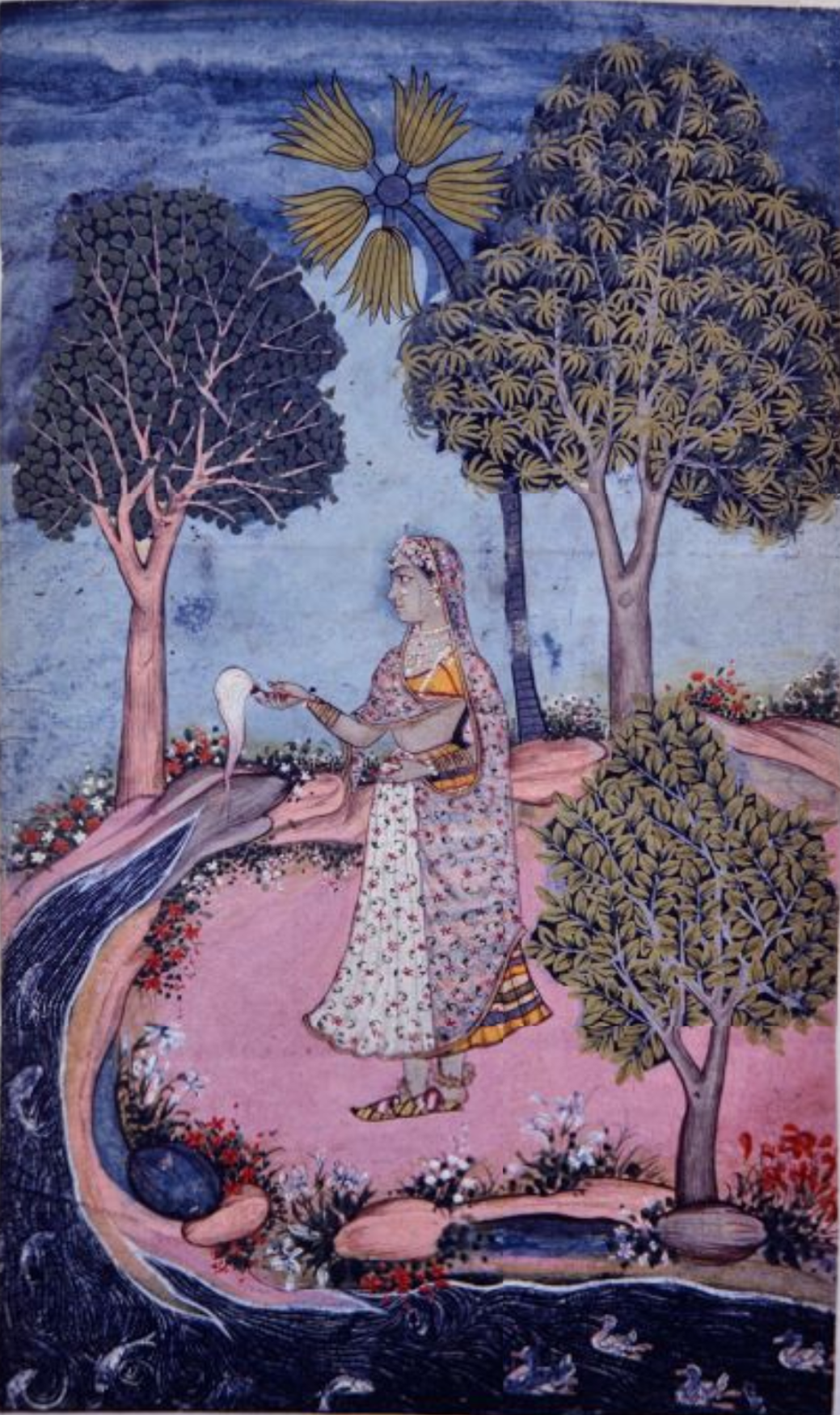
- Thaat: Khamaj
- Type: Audava-Audava
- Time of day: 2nd Prahar of the night
- Arohana: S G M P N Ṡ
- Avarohana: S Ṉ P M G S
- Vadi: G
- Samavadi: N
- Similar: Jog

Tilang is a raga in Indian classical music, that belongs to the Khamaj Thaat.

== Scale ==
- Arohana (ascending scale): S G M P N Ṡ
- Avarohana (descending scale): S Ṉ P M G S

This raga has a lowered seventh, Ṉ (Hindi: कोमल नी, romanized: komala nī) in the descending scale.

Its defining characteristics are: P Ṡ N Ṡ Ṉ P, P Ṡ N Ṡ P Ṉ P. Some performers add a Re to create the following pattern: Ṡ Ṙ N Ṡ P Ṉ P.

=== Vādī and Samvādī ===
- Vadi : Ga
- Samvadi : Ni

== In Carnatic music ==
This raga originated in Hindustani classical music and has been taken into Carnatic music. It is derived from the 28th Melakarta (parent scale) Harikambhoji. It is an audava-audava raga (pentatonic asymmetrical scale) with the following structure.

- Arohana: S G₃ M₁ P N₃ Ṡ (Note: Alternate notations: Hindustani: S G M P N Ṡ; Western: C E F G B C)
- Avarohana: Ṡ N₂ P M G₃ S (Note: Alternate notations: Hindustani: Ṡ Ṉ P G S; Western: C B♭ G F E C)

== Scale similarities ==
- Gambhiranata raga is a symmetrical Carnatic raga with N3 (Kakali Niṣāda) in both ascending and descending scales, while Tilang uses Kaisiki Niṣāda (N2) in descending scale.
- Savitri raga is a symmetrical Carnatic raga with N2 (Kaisiki Niṣāda) in both ascending and descending scales, while Tilang uses Kakali Niṣāda (N3) in ascending scale.

Tilang therefore has the Arohana (ascending scale) of Gambhiranata, and Avrohana (descending scale) of Savitri.
