= Sorath (raga) =

India musical raga

Sorath raga
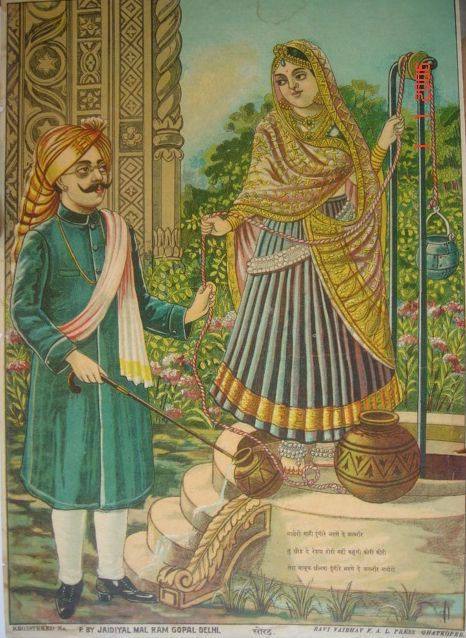
- Thaat: Khamaj
- Arohana: Sa Re Ma Pa Ni Sa
- Avarohana: Sa Re Ṉi Dha, Ma Pa Dha Ma [Ga]Re Ni Sa (Gandhar is only used through Meend)
- Vadi: Re
- Samavadi: Dha
- Similar: Desh

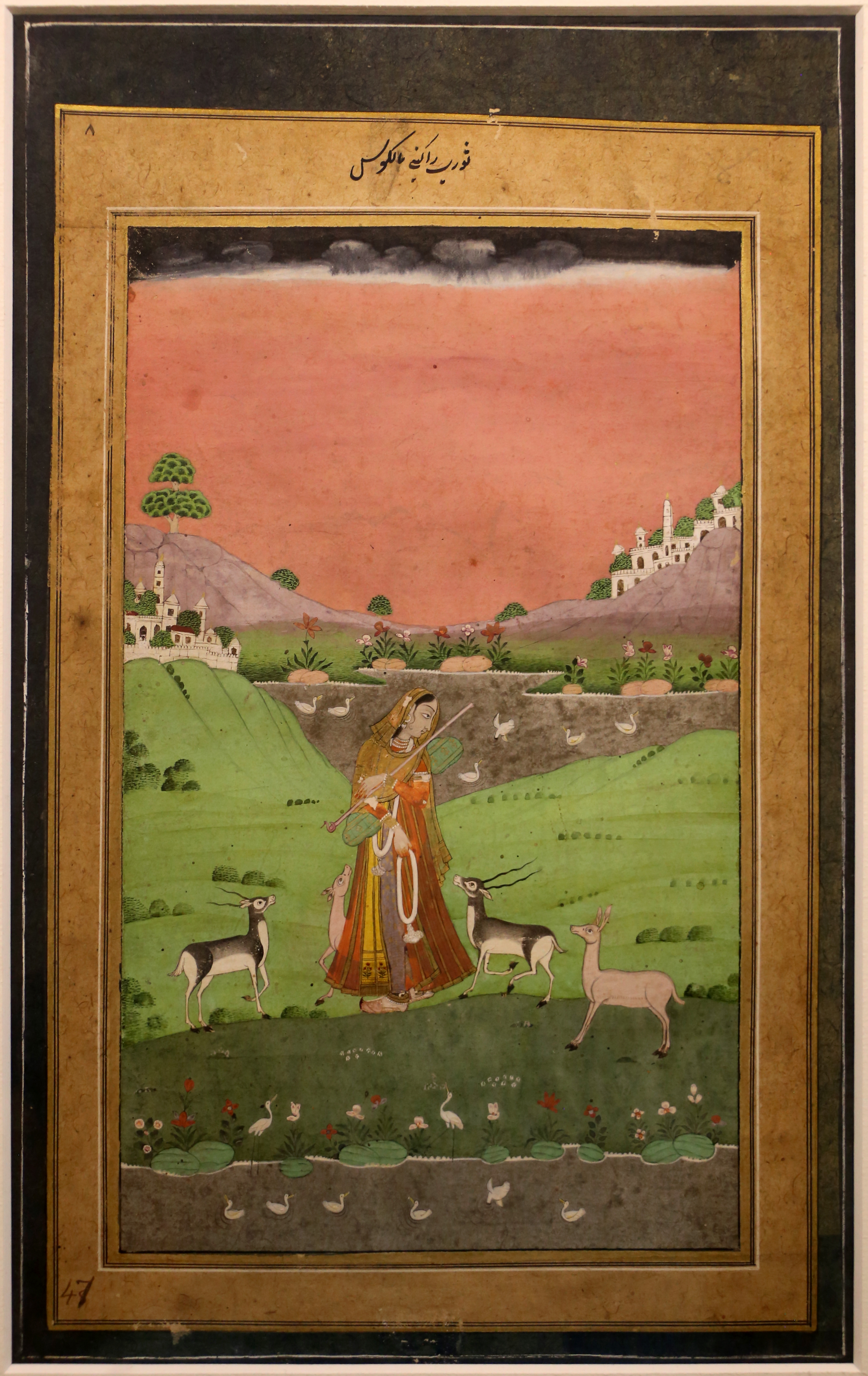
Ragini Sorath, Hyderabad, c. 1750

Sorath is an India musical raga (musical mode) that appears in the Sikh tradition from northern India and is part of the Sikh holy scripture called Sri Guru Granth Sahib. Every raga has a strict set of rules which govern the number of notes that can be used; which notes can be used; and their interplay that has to be adhered to for the composition of a tune. In the Guru Granth Sahib, the Sikh holy Granth (book) there are a total of 60 raga compositions and this raga is the twenty fifth raga to appear in the series. The composition in this raga appear on a total of 65 pages from page numbers 595 to 660.

Raga Sorath belongs to the Khamaj thaat. Besides Guru Nanak, Sorath was used by Guru Amar Das, Guru Ram Das, Guru Arjan and Guru Tegh Bahadar for a total of 150 hymns plus numerous slokas.

Raag Sorath (ਸੋਰਠਿ) – Sorath conveys the feeling of having such a strong belief in something that you want to keep repeating the experience. In fact this feeling of certainty is so strong that you become the belief and live that belief. The atmosphere of Sorath is so powerful, that eventually even the most unresponsive listener will be attracted.

The following represents the order of notes that can be used on the ascending and descending phase of the composition and the primary and secondary notes:

- Arohana: Sa Re Ma Pa Ni Sa
- Avarohana: Sa Re Ni Dha, Ma Pa Dha Ma Ga Re Ni Sa
- Vadi: Re
- Samavadi: Dha

The melodies are characterized by sweeping phrases with glides connecting all leaps, even the shorter ones. Movement is moderately fast.

Raga Sorath is named after Saurashtra, Gujarat.

== See also ==
- Kirtan
- Raga
- Taal
