= Nat Bhairav =

Hindustani raga

- Thaat: Bhairav
- Type: Sampurna
- Time of day: Morning, 6–9
- Arohana: Sa Re Ga Ma Pa Dha Ni Sa'
- Avarohana: Sa' Ni Dha Pa Ma Ga Re Sa
- Pakad: Sa-Re-Ga-Ma-Dha Pa; Ga-Ma-Re-Sa; 'Ni-'Dha-Sa
- Vadi: Ma
- Samavadi: Sa
- Equivalent: Sarasangi; Harmonic major scale

Nat Bhairav (or also written as Nut Bhairav) (Hindi: नट भैरव) is a Hindustani classical heptatonic (Sampurna) raga of Bhairav Thaat. Traditionally it is a morning raga. It is one of the most important ragas of the Bhairav anga.

This raga is not be confused with the Natabhairavi, the 20th Melakarta of Carnatic Music. Sarasangi, which is the 27th Melakarta in Carnatic music, has the same scale as the Nat Bhairav in Hindustani music. In Western theory it is called the harmonic major scale.

== Theory ==
Writing about the musical theory of Hindustani music is fraught with complications. Firstly, there have been no set, formal methods of written notation. Secondly, Hindustani music is an oral tradition, and therefore writing is not an essential part of learning. However, Nat Bhairav is a morning raga. The raga reflects the mood of slight pathos with heroic exuberance.

=== Arohana and Avarohana ===
Arohana

Sa, Re, Ga, Ma, Pa, Dha, Ni, Sa' C, D, E, F, G, A♭, B, C'

Avarohana

Sa', Ni, Dha, Pa, Ma, Ga, Re, Sa C', B, A♭, G, F, E, D, C

=== Pakad or Chalan ===
Dha-Ni-Sa'

Sa-Re-Sa

Sa-Re-Ga-Ma-Dha-Pa, Ga-Ma-Re-Sa, Re-'Ni-'Dha-Sa

While the above is true, modern (20th century) treatment of the Raga is slightly different. The basic Chalan of the Raga has de facto shifted the Vadi-Samvadi (Point-Counterpoint) duo to Re-Dha; and the basic characteristic phrase has become Re-Dha-Re, Re-Ga, Ga-Ma, Ma-Pa; Ma-NiDha-Pa, Ga-(Ma)-Re-Sa; Sa-'NiSa-'Dha.

It is believed that this Chalan brings out clearly the Nat-ang in Nat Bhairav.

=== Organization and relationships ===
Related ragas:

- Bhairav (raga)
- Ahir Bhairav
- Thaat: Bhairav

== Behaviour ==
As the name suggests, this raga is a combination of Nat and Bhairav (Shah [Bhairav ke Prakar] 1991: 255). It is regarded as one of the varieties of Bhairav. The lower tetra chord has the notes of Nat whereas in the upper tetra chord Bhairav is evident. Therefore, except Komal Dha, all the other notes are natural. The raga comes across as a musical entity with heroic exuberance, along with a slight feeling of pathos.

=== Samay (Time) ===
Nat Bhairav is an early morning raga. This raga has a distinct character although at times imbued with impressions of Bhairav.

=== Seasonality ===
Nat Bhairav is one of few ragas that can be sung in any season.

=== Rasa ===
Nat Bhairav is typically performed with a musical entity with heroic exuberance, along with a slight feeling of pathos.

== Film Songs ==
Nat Bhairav is a popular raga for film songs. Here are some film songs based on Nat Bhairav:

- "Badli Se Nikla Hai Chaand" – Sanjog, 1961
- "Tere Naina Kyon Bhar Aaye" – Geet, 1970
