= Sindhu Bhairavi (raga) =

Janya raga of Carnatic music

- Thaat: Asavari
- Arohana: S Ṟ G̱ M G̱ P Ḏ Ṉ Ṡ
- Avarohana: N Ḏ P M G̱ Ṟ S Ṉ S
- Vadi: Ḏ
- Samavadi: G̱
- Synonym: Sindh Bhairavi

Sindhu Bhairavi is a raga in Hindustani and Carnatic classical music, belonging to the Asavari thaat. In Carnatic music it is a Janya raga of the 8th melakartha raga Hanumatodi.

The raga brings Viraham (separation), Shokam (sorrow), Karunam (compassion) and Bhakthi (devotion) rasas. In Carnatic music it is a Bhashangaraga, in which all the 12 notes are applicable.

Sindhu Bhairavi is not to be confused with other similarly named ragas such as Sindhi Bhairavi, Sindh, Sindhura and Sindhura Bhairavi.

== Theory ==
Arohana: S Ṟ G̱ M P Ḏ Ṉ Ṡ (Note: Alternate notations: Carnatic: S R₁ G₂ M₁ P D₁ N₂ Ṡ; Western: C D♭ E♭ F G A♭ B♭ C)

Avarohana: Ṡ Ṉ Ḏ P M G̱ Ṟ S (Note: Alternate notations: Carnatic: Ṡ N₂ D₁ P M₁ G₂ R₁ S; Western: C B♭ A♭ G F E♭ D♭ C)

Vadi: Ḏ

Samavadi: G̱

== Sources ==
- Sindhu Bhairavi Rāga (Hin), The Oxford Encyclopaedia of the Music of India. Oxford University Press. ISBN 9780195650983.
