= Gunakri =

- Thaat: Bhairav
- Type: Audava
- Time of day: Daybreak
- Arohana: S Ṟ M P Ḏ Ṡ (Note: Alternate notations: Carnatic: S R₁ M₁ P D₁ Ṡ; Western: C D♭ F G A♭ C)
- Avarohana: Ṡ Ḏ P M Ṟ S (Note: Alternate notations: Carnatic: Ṡ D₁ P M₁ R₁ S; Western: C A♭ G F D♭ C)
- Vadi: Ḏ
- Samavadi: Ṟ
- Synonym: Gunkali; Gunakriya
- Similar: Jogiya

Gunakri is a raga in Hindustani classical music. Some consider it to be the same as the raga, Gunkali, while others consider the two to be distinct ragas. Gunakri is usually used in the khyal and dhrupad forms.
