= Bibhas =

Hindustani raga

- Thaat: Bhairav
- Type: Audava
- Time of day: Daybreak
- Arohana: S r G P d S'
- Avarohana: S' d P G r S
- Pakad: r G r G; P d S'; d P G r S
- Vadi: d
- Samavadi: r
- Synonym: Vibhas
- Similar: Deshkar

Bibhas is a Hindustani classical raga.

== Theory ==
Bibhas (sometimes also called 'Vibhas') is a pentatonic raga belonging to the Bhairav Thaat. This Raga is sung during daybreak. It is quite similar to Raga Deshkar as changing the Shuddha Dha and Shuddha Re of Deshkar converts it into Bibhas. The true nature of Bibhas has Re and Dha flat. However, it is very rarely performed using the Shuddha Dha. In order to maintain the pure character of Bibhas, it is very important that Pa is not the last note during any alap or taan. The atmosphere created by this raga is serious, as it has Komal 'Re' and 'Dha'.

=== Arohana and avarohana ===
Arohana: Sa Re Ga Pa Dha Sa' Avarohana: Sa' Dha Pa Ga Re Sa

=== Thaat ===
Bhairav Thaat

=== Vadi and samavadi ===
Dha & Re

=== Pakad or Chalan ===
Re Ga Re Ga, Pa Dha Sa', Dha Pa Ga Re Sa.

=== Organization and relationships ===
Related ragas: Rewa, Jait

== Behavior ==
Behavior refers to practical aspects of the music. It is complicated to talk about this for Hindustani music since many of the concepts are fluid, changing, or archaic. The following information cannot be accurate, but it can attempt to reflect how the music existed.

=== Samay (time) ===
Bibhas is sung at daybreak.

=== Important recordings ===
Bhibaas was once sung in the Sangeet Varsha, which occurred on June 7, 2015, hosted by Svara Sangam. This raag has been sung by many masters, to name a few, Pt. Jitendra Abhisheki, Pt. Mallikarjun Mansur and Vidhushi Kishori Amonkar.

== Film songs ==
=== Language:Tamil ===
Song	Movie	Composer	Singer
Nee Palli Ezhundhaal	Raja Mukthi	C. R. Subburaman	M. K. Thyagaraja Bhagavathar
Panniner Mozhiyaal	Thiruvarutchelvar	K. V. Mahadevan	T. M. Soundararajan, Master Maharajan
Sugamana Sindhanaiyil	Taxi Driver	M. S. Viswanathan	S. P. Balasubrahmanyam, S. Janaki
Kozhi Koovum	Vanna Vanna Pookkal	Ilaiyaraaja	S. P. Balasubrahmanyam, S. Janaki
Degam Pon Degam	Anbulla Malare	Ilaiyaraaja	S. Janaki
Bhoomiye Enga	Puthu Paatu	Ilaiyaraaja	Mano, S. Janaki
Vidinthatha Pozhuthu	Pillai Paasam	Ilaiyaraaja	Ilaiyaraaja
Senthazham Poovil	Mullum Malarum	Ilaiyaraaja	K.J. Yesudas
Kathiravanai Paarthu	Pookkal Vidum Thudhu	T. Rajendar	K.J. Yesudas
Ponmaanai	Mythili Ennai Kaathali	T. Rajendar	S. P. Balasubrahmanyam
Boobalam Arangerum	Agni Theertham	Shankar–Ganesh	K.J. Yesudas
Paarthu Sirikithu Bommai	Thirumathi Oru Vegumathi	Shankar–Ganesh	Vani Jairam
Vaigai Neerada	Chinnanchiru Kiliye	G. K. Venkatesh	Malaysia Vasudevan, S. Janaki
Kaalai Veyil Nerathile	Then Chittugal	Vijay Ramani	P. Jayachandran
Kadhal Kavithai Paada	Ganam Courtar Avargale	Devendran	S. P. Balasubrahmanyam, K.S. Chitra
Paadum Paravaigal Sangeetham	Shenbagathottam	Sirpy	S. Janaki
