= Ahir Bhairav =

Hindustani raga

- Thaat: Bhairav
- Time of day: First prahara
- Arohana: S Ṟ G M P D Ṉ Ṡ
- Avarohana: Ṡ Ṉ D P M G Ṟ S
- Vadi: dha
- Samavadi: Re
- Equivalent: Chakravakam (Carnatic)

Ahir Bhairav is a Hindustani classical raga. It is a mixture of Bhairav and the ancient, rare raga Ahiri or Abhiri, or perhaps a mixture of Bhairav and Bageshree.

The closest Carnatic music equivalent of this raga is Chakravakam

== Theory ==
=== Arohana and avarohana ===
Arohana: S Ṟ G M P D Ṉ Ṡ (Note: Alternate notations: Carnatic: S R₁ G₃ M₁ P D₂ N₂ Ṡ; Western: C D♭ E F G A B♭ C)

Avarohana: Ṡ Ṉ D P M G Ṟ S (Note: Alternate notations: Carnatic: Ṡ N₂ D₂ P M₁ G₃ R₁ S; Western: C B♭ A G F E D♭ C)

Key:

S, G, M, P, D: shuddha (natural);

r, n : komal (flat);

Pa and Sa are sometimes avoided in ascending Arohan. The descent can be direct, but is often expressed as S' N d P m, G m ^{G}r ~ S with a slight oscillation on komal re to express the character of Bhairav.

=== Vadi and samavadi ===
Vadi: M

Samavadi: S

=== Pakad or Chalan ===
S, r G M, G M r, ṇ Ḍ, ṇ r S

| komal Ni, shuddha Dha, komal Ni, komal Re, Sa | is the most characteristic run, where the Ni and Dha belong to the lower octave and the Re and Sa are from the middle octave. Some andolan/oscillation is typically at the flattened second (komal re).

=== Organization and relationships ===
It may include impressions of Kafi. The image of Ahir Bhairav is easily maintained with the characteristic passage ṇ Ḍ ṇ/r~ S with the characteristic Bhairav andolan (oscillation) on komal re. Sometimes shuddha ni is used in the lower octave to emphasize the Bhairav character.

The Carnatic music equivalent to this raga is Chakravakam.

Related ragas:

- Bhairav
- Nat Bhairav

Thaat: Bhairav

== Behaviour ==
Ahir Bhairav is a typical uttarang raga, which means emphasis is on the upper tetrachord.

=== Performance ===
It is usually sung as the first Prahr of the morning, around 6:00 am – 9:00 am.

== Recordings and compositions ==
Ravi Shankar, Three Classical Ragas. His Master's Voice LP, 1957. and Angel Records CD, 2000.

Hariprasad Chaurasia, Raga Ahir Bhairav and Marriage Song from Uttar Pradesh. Nimbus Records CD, 1987.

Nikhil Banerjee, Raga Ahir Bhairav. Multitone Records, UK Limited, 1995. LP. (Available on iTunes.)

Wasif-ud-din Dagar, Chalo sakhi braj raje. Alap and Composition in Dhamar. Music Today. A97015. Cassette.

Traditional compositions in Raag Ahir Bhairav are:

- Man Rangeele (Teental 32BPM Vilambit)
- Shankara Mhaarare (180BPM Drut); popularised by Nagaraja Rao Havaldar
- Mohe Chedo Na Giridhaari (170 BPM Drut); popularised by Parveen Sultana

== Film songs ==
=== Language: Hindi ===
| Song | Movie | Composer | Artists |
|---|---|---|---|
| Man Aanand Aanand Chhaayo | Vijeta | Ajit Varman | Ajit Varman, Asha Bhosle, and Satyasheel Deshpande |
| Meri Veena Tum Bin Roye | Dekh Kabira Roya | Madan Mohan | Lata Mangeshkar |
| Poochho Na Kaise Maine Rain Bitaayi | Meri Surat Teri Ankhen | S.D. Burman | Shiv Dayal Batish, Manna Dey |
| Waqt Karataa Jo Wafaa Aap Hamaare Hote | Dil Ne Pukara 1967 | Kalyanji-Anandji | Mukesh |
| Ram Teri Ganga Maili Ho Gayee (Title Track) | Ram Teri Ganga Maili | Ravindra Jain | Suresh Wadkar, Chorus |
| Ab Tere Bin | Aashiqui | Nadeem-Shravan | Kumar Sanu |
| Solah Baras Ki | Ek Duje Ke Liye | Laxmikant-Pyarelal | Lata Mangeshkar, Anup Jalota |
| Albela Sajan | Hum Dil De Chuke Sanam | Ismail Darbar | Ustad Sultan Khan, Shankar Mahadevan |
| Albela Sajan | Bajirao Mastani | Sanjay Leela Bhansali | Shashi Suman, Kunal Pandit, Prithvi Gandharva, Kanika Joshi, Rashi Raagga, Geetikka Manjrekar |
| Aur Ho | Rockstar | A.R. Rehman | Mohit Chauhan, Alma Ferovic |

=== Language: Tamil ===
| Song | Movie | Composer | Artists |
|---|---|---|---|
| Ullathil Nalla Ullam | Karnan | Viswanathan–Ramamoorthy | Sirkazhi Govindarajan |
| Vanithamani | Vikram | Ilaiyaraaja | S. P. Balasubrahmanyam, S. Janaki, Kamal Haasan |
| Vaanile Thenila | Kaakki Sattai | Ilaiyaraaja | S. P. Balasubrahmanyam, S. Janaki |
| Chalakku Chalakku | Chembaruthi | Ilaiyaraaja | Mano, S. Janaki |
| Nee Pathi Naan Pathi | Keladi Kanmani | Ilaiyaraaja | K. J. Yesudas, Uma Ramanan |
| Poonkatrae | Friends | Ilaiyaraaja | Hariharan |
| Vidu Kathaiya | Muthu | A. R. Rahman | Hariharan |
| Eechambazham | Pavithra | A. R. Rahman | Shahul Hameed, K.S. Chitra |
| Vaa Vaa En Veenaiyae | Sattam | Gangai Amaran | S. P. Balasubrahmanyam, Vani Jairam |
| Megangal Ennai Thottu | Amarkkalam | Bharadwaj | S. P. Balasubrahmanyam |

== Carnatic music ==
Chakravakam, the 16th Melakarta raga of Carnatic music, which is a sampurna scale (all seven notes in ascending and descending scale), closely resembles Ahir Bhairav. However, in the modern times Ahir Bhairav raga has been used in a few Carnatic music compositions and many South Indian film songs as well.

== Sources ==
(most) entries due to:

- Bagchee, Sandeep (1999), NĀD Understanding Raga Music, Mumbai: Eshwar, ISBN 81-86982-08-6
- Bhatkhande, Vishnu Nayaran (1968–73), Hindusthānī Sangīta Paddhaati: Kramika Pustaka Mālikā (6 vols.), vol. 5, Hathras: Sangeet Karyalaya, pp. 346–351
- Bhatkhande, Vishnu Nayaran (1968–75), Hindusthānī Sangīta Paddhaati: Sangīta Śāstra (4 vols), vol. 2, Hathras: Sangeet Karyalaya, pp. 359–376
- Bhatt, Balvantray; Bhaṭṭa, Balavantarāya Gulābarāya (1964–1982), Bhāvaranga Lahāri, vol. 2, Varanasi: Vitaraka Motīlāla Banārasīdāsa, pp. 53–61, OCLC 12918179
- Gandharva, Kumar (1965), Anūpa rāga vilāsa, Bombay: Mauj Prakashan, pp. 4–5
- Jha, Ramashraya (1968–78), Ābhinava Gītānjali (2 vols), vol. 1, Allahabad: Sangeet Sadan Prakashan, pp. 299–319
- Kaufmann, Walter (1984), The ragas of North India, Calcutta, New Dheli, Bombay: Da Capo Press, ISBN 0-306-76169-6, OCLC 8220451
- Khan, Raja Nawab Ali; Khāṃ, Navāba Alī (1952), Māriphunnagamāta, vol. 1, Hathras: Saṃgīta Kāryālaya, pp. 216–217, OCLC 69396515
- Khan, Raja Nawab Ali; Khāṃ, Navāba Alī (1952), Māriphunnagamāta, vol. 2, Hathras: Saṃgīta Kāryālaya, pp. 95–97, OCLC 69396515
- Moutal, Patrick (1991), Hindustāni Rāgas Index, New Dheli: Munshiram Manoharlal Publishers Pvt Ltd, ISBN 81-215-0525-9
- Patki, J.D (1971–75), Aprakāśita Rāga, vol. 3, Hathras: Saṅgīta Kāryālaya, pp. 85–90, OCLC 313609634
- Patwaradan, Narayan Rao (1972), Tarala Prabandhāvalī, Rajasthan: Vanasthali Vidyapith, p. 4
- Patwaradan, Vinayak Rao; Paṭavardhana, Vināyaka Nārāyaṇa (1962–1971), Raga Vijñāna (7 vols), vol. 5, Poona: Madhusūdana Vināyaka Paṭavardhana, pp. 193–198, OCLC 69221634
- Phulambrikar, Krishnarao, Rāga Sangraha (7 vols), vol. 6, Poona, pp. 1–4
- Ratanjankar, S.N. (1962), Abhinava Gīta Manjarī, vol. 2a, Bombay: Pŏpyulara Prakāśana, pp. 144–148, OCLC 63027697
- Srivastava, Jaisuklai (1969), Malhāra Ke Prakāra, vol. 4, Bombay: Jaisuklal Shah, pp. 19–22
- Vaze, Ramkrishna Narahar (1938), Sangīta Kala Prakāśa, vol. 1, Poona: Ramkrishna Sangeet Vidyalaya, pp. 79–80, OCLC 47893854
- Rao, Suvarnalata; Wim, van der Meer; Jane, Harvey (1999), Bor, Joep (ed.), The Raga Guide: A Survey of 74 Hindustani Ragas, London: Zenith Media, archived from the original on 2003-12-03
