= Khamaj =

Hindustani classical music raga

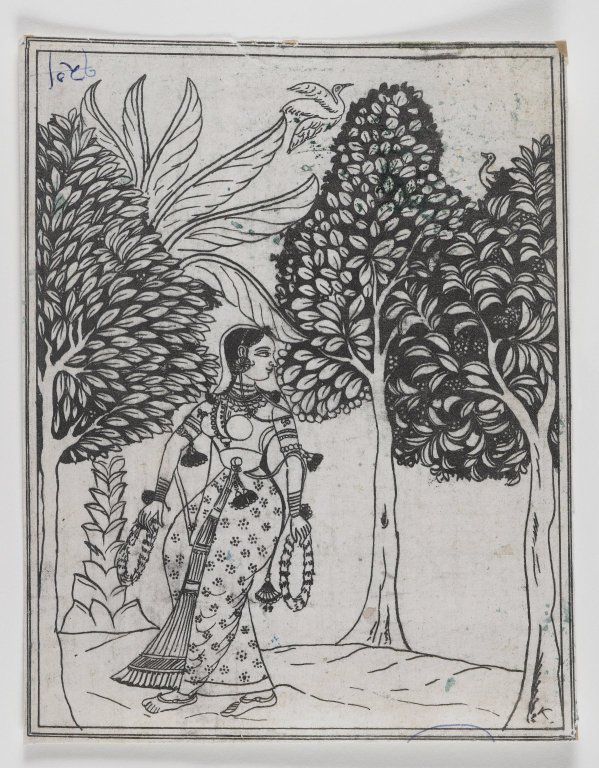
- Thaat: Khamaj
- Type: Shadava-sampurna
- Time of day: Late night, 9–12
- Arohana: S G M P D N Ṡ
- Avarohana: Ṡ Ṉ D P M G R S
- Pakad: Ṉ D M P D M G
- Vadi: G
- Samavadi: N
- Synonym: Kamboja; Kambhoji; Kambodi; Kamodi
- Equivalent: Harikambhoji; Mixolydian mode
- Similar: Desh, Khambavati

Khamaj (IAST: Khamāj) is a Hindustani classical music raga within the Khamaj thaat which is named after it.

Many ghazals and thumris are based on Khamaj. It utilises the shuddha (pure) form of Ni on the ascent, and the komala (flat) form of Ni on the descent, creating a key asymmetry in compositional and improvisational performance. This raga has been explored more in the lighter forms of Hindustani Classical Music such as Thumri, Tappa etc. Having said that, many compositions in Dhrupad and Khayal are found as well. Harikambhoji is the equivalent rāgam in Carnatic music.

== Theory [Raag Shashtra] ==
Arohana: S G M P D N Ṡ (Note: Alternate notations: Carnatic: S G₃ M₁ P D₂ N₃ Ṡ; Western: C E F G A B C)

Avroha: Ṡ Ṉ D P M G R S (Note: Alternate notations: Carnatic: Ṡ N₂ D₂ P M₁ G₃ R₂ S; Western: C B♭ A G F E D C)

Vadi Swar: G

Samavadi Swar: N

== Compositions ==
In Dhrupad, Sadra, Khayal, Thumri & Tappa styles :

- Sudhi Bisara Gayi...(Sadra form – in 10 beat cycle of Jhaptal. Sung by Abdul Karim Khan of Kirana Gharana)
- "Ban Ban Dhunda liyo banvari......"(Set in TeenTal, composed by Acharya Dr Pandit Gokulotsavji Maharaj)
- "nand ghar aaj baje badhai......"(Set in TeenTal, composed by Acharya Dr Pandit Gokulotsavji Maharaj)
- Piya Tori Tirchhi Najar Laage Pyaari Re... (Bol Banav Ki Thumri form. Sung by Faiyaz Khan of Agra Gharana)
- Koyaliyan Kuhuk/Kook Sunaave... (Khayal/Bandishi Thumri form – in 16 beat cycle of Teentala. Sung by Nisar Hussain Khan of Rampur Gharana, Ajoy Chakrabarty of Patiala Gharana
- Shyaam Rang Daari... (Dhrupad form – in 14 beat cycle of Dhamar Tala. Sung by N. Zahiruddin Dagar & F. Wasfuddin Dagar)
- Ab Maan Jao Saiyaan...(Dadra) sung by Ustad Ghulam Abbas Khan of Rampur Sahaswan Gharana
- Sudh Naa Lini Jabse Gaye... (Dadra form – Sung by Faiyaz Khan of Agra Gharana and also Mentioned in Vishnu Narayan Bhatkhande's Kramik Pustak Malika Vol. 2)

Hindi Film Songs based on Raga Khamaj:

- Bada natkhat hai...ka kare yashoda maiya, "Kuchh Toh Log Kahenge" and Raina Beet Jaye (with Todi in mukhara) – Amar Prem
- Ayo kahanse ghanashyam – Buddha Mil Gaya
- Vo na aenge palatkar – Devdaas
- A dilse dil mila le – Navrang
- Dhal chuki shame Gam – Kohinoor
- Khat likha de savariyake nam babu
- Mere to giridharagopala – Meera
- Tere bina sajna lage na jiya hamar – Aarti
- Tere mere milan ki ye raina – Abhimaan
- Khamaj – Fuzön sung by Shafqat Amanat Ali
- Mitwa – Kabhi alvida na kehna

The Narsinh Bhajan "Vaishnav jan to" is also based on Khamaj.

The Sargam Geet is as follows: set to teentaal, that is sixteen beats:

1	2	3	4	5	6	7	8	9	10	11	12	13	14	15	16
G	G	S	G	M	P	G	M	N	D	_	M	P	D	_	M
G	_	_	_	D	N	S'	_	S '	N	D	P	M	G	R	S

This is the Prelude to the Sargam Geet, the underscore signifies the avagraha i.e. prolongation of the immediate previous note by one beat for one _ and
three beats in case of _ _ _

== Film Songs ==
=== Language : Hindi ===
Song	Movie	Composer	Singers
Vo Na Ayenge Palatkar	Devdas	S. D. Burman	Mubarak Begum
Piya Tose Naina Lage Re	Guide	S. D. Burman	Lata Mangeshkar
Nazar Lagi Raja Tore Bungle Par	Kala Pani	S. D. Burman	Asha Bhosle
Ham Apna Unhe Bana Na Sake	Bhanwara	Khemchand Prakash	K. L. Saigal
Sajana Saanjh Bhayi	Roti	Anil Biswas (composer)	Begum Akhtar
Ab Kya Misal Dun	Aarti	Roshan (music director)	Mohammed Rafi
Tere Bina Sajna Lage Na Jiya Hamar	Aarti	Roshan (music director)	Mohammed Rafi, Lata Mangeshkar
Bata Do Koi Kaun Gali Gaye Shyam	Madhu	Roshan (music director)	Mohammed Rafi, Lata Mangeshkar
A Dil Se Dil Mila Le	Navrang	C. Ramchandra	Asha Bhosle
Dhal Chuki Sham-e-Gham	Kohinoor	Naushad	Mohammed Rafi
Chunariya Katati Jae	Mother India	Naushad	Mohammed Rafi, Lata Mangeshkar, Shamshad Begum
Ham Tere Pyar Mein	Dil Ek Mandir	Shankar–Jaikishan, Hasrat Jaipuri	Lata Mangeshkar
Mere To Giridhara Gopala	Meera	Ravi Shankar	Vani Jairam, Dinkar Kamanna
Sakhi Re Suun Bole Papiha	Miss Mary	Hemant Kumar	Lata Mangeshkar, Asha Bhosle
Jao Re jogi tum jao re	Amrapali	Shankar–Jaikishan	Lata Mangeshkar
O Sajna Barakha Bahara Ayi	Parakh	Salil Chowdhury	Lata Mangeshkar
Ayo Kahan Se Ghanashyam	Buddha Mil Gaya	R. D. Burman	Manna Dey, Archana Mahanta
Bada Natkhat Hai Re Krishna Kahaiya	Amar Prem	R. D. Burman	Lata Mangeshkar
Kuch To Log Kahenge	Amar Prem	R. D. Burman	Kishore Kumar
Sham Dhale Jamuna Kinare	Pushpanjali	Laxmikant–Pyarelal	Lata Mangeshkar, Manna Dey
Khat Likh De Savariya Ke Naam Babu	Aaye Din Bahar Ke	Laxmikant–Pyarelal	Asha Bhosle

=== Language:Tamil ===
Song	Movie	Composer	Singer
Gnayiru Enbathu	Kaakum Karangal	K. V. Mahadevan	T. M. Soundararajan, P. Susheela
Kalviya Selvama Veerama	Saraswati Sabatham	K. V. Mahadevan	T. M. Soundararajan
Ennirandhu 16 Vayathu	Annai Illam	K. V. Mahadevan	T. M. Soundararajan
Anbulla Maanvizhiye	Kuzhandaiyum Deivamum	M. S. Viswanathan	T. M. Soundararajan
Ore Padal Unnai Azhaikkum	Engirundho Vandhaal	M. S. Viswanathan	T. M. Soundararajan
Sumaithaangi Saaindhaal	Thanga Pathakkam	M. S. Viswanathan	T. M. Soundararajan
Mellapo Mellapo	Kaavalkaaran	M. S. Viswanathan	T. M. Soundararajan, P. Susheela
Kungamapottin Mangalam	Kudiyirundha Koyil	M. S. Viswanathan	T. M. Soundararajan, P. Susheela
Vizhiye Vizhiye	Puthiya Bhoomi	M. S. Viswanathan	T. M. Soundararajan, P. Susheela
Acham Enbadhu Madamaiyada	Mannadhi Mannan	Viswanathan–Ramamoorthy	T. M. Soundararajan
Malargalai Pol Thangai	Pasamalar	Viswanathan–Ramamoorthy	T. M. Soundararajan
Kelvi Piranthathu	Pachai Vilakku	Viswanathan–Ramamoorthy	T. M. Soundararajan
Silar Siripaar Silar Azhuvaar	Paava Mannippu	Viswanathan–Ramamoorthy	T. M. Soundararajan
Kalangalil Aval Vasantham	Paava Mannippu	Viswanathan–Ramamoorthy	P. B. Sreenivas
Anbumanam Kanindhapinne	Aalukkoru Veedu	Viswanathan–Ramamoorthy	P. B. Sreenivas, P. Susheela
Unnai Ondru Ketpen	Puthiya Paravai	Viswanathan–Ramamoorthy	P. Susheela
Athaimadi Methaiyadi	Karpagam	Viswanathan–Ramamoorthy	P. Susheela
Muthana Muthallavo	Nenjil Or Aalayam	Viswanathan–Ramamoorthy	P. Susheela
Kavalaigal Kidakattum	Bandha Pasam	Viswanathan–Ramamoorthy	T. M. Soundararajan, P. B. Sreenivas
Odam Nadhiyinile	Kathiruntha Kangal	Viswanathan–Ramamoorthy	Sirkazhi Govindarajan
Devankoyil Maniyosai	Mani Osai	Viswanathan–Ramamoorthy	Sirkazhi Govindarajan
Thookam Un Kangalai	Aalayamani	Viswanathan–Ramamoorthy	S. Janaki
Ammavuku Manasukulle	Manapanthal	Viswanathan–Ramamoorthy	S.C.Krishnan
Amaithiyaana Nathiyinile	Aandavan Kattalai	Viswanathan–Ramamoorthy	T. M. Soundararajan, P. Susheela
Naan Malarodu Thaniyaga	Iru Vallavargal	Vedha	T. M. Soundararajan, P. Susheela
Naane Naana	Azhage Unnai Aarathikkiren	Ilayaraja	Vani Jairam
Manasukkulle Nayana	Mallu Vetti Minor	Ilayaraja	Arunmozhi, S. Janaki
Megam Karukayilae	Vaidehi Kathirunthal	Ilayaraja	Ilayaraja, Uma Ramanan
Adukku Malli Yeduthu	Aavarampoo	Ilayaraja	S. P. Balasubrahmanyam, S. Janaki
Mandhiram Idhu	Aavarampoo	Ilayaraja	K. J. Yesudas
Kanavu Kaanum	Neengal Kettavai	Ilayaraja	K. J. Yesudas
Pottu Vaitha Oru Vatta Nila	Idhayam	Ilayaraja	K. J. Yesudas
Pazhamuthir Cholai	Varusham Padhinaaru	Ilayaraja	K. J. Yesudas
Adi Kaana Karunkuyile	Poonthotta Kaavalkaaran	Ilayaraja	K. J. Yesudas
Vaana Malai	Idhu Namma Bhoomi	Ilayaraja	K. J. Yesudas
Eduthu Vecha	Ninaive Oru Sangeetham	Ilayaraja	S. Janaki, S. P. Balasubrahmanyam(Pathos)
Sandhu Pottu	Thevar Magan	Ilayaraja	S. P. Balasubrahmanyam, Kamal Haasan
Enna Paada Sollathey	Aan Paavam	Ilayaraja	S. Janaki
Nadhi Odum Karaiyoram	Aavarampoo	Ilayaraja	S. Janaki
Chinna Kuyil Paadum Pattu	Poove Poochooda Vaa	Ilayaraja	K. S. Chitra
Thenmadurai Seemaiyile	Thangamana Raasa	Ilayaraja	K. S. Chitra
Oru Naal Oru Kanavu	Kannukkul Nilavu	Ilayaraja	K. J. Yesudas, Anuradha Sriram
Thendral Varum	Friends	Ilayaraja	Hariharan, Bhavatharini
Diana Diana	Kaadhal Kavithai	Ilayaraja	Hariharan
Ennavendru Solvathamma	Rajakumaran	Ilayaraja	S. P. Balasubrahmanyam
En Kadhale	Duet	A. R. Rahman	S. P. Balasubrahmanyam
Chinna Chinna Aasai(Shankarabaranam traces too)	Roja	A. R. Rahman	Minmini
Uyire Uyire(charanam in Charukesi)	Bombay	A. R. Rahman	Hariharan, K. S. Chithra
Kannukku Mai Azhagu	Pudhiya Mugam	A. R. Rahman	Unni Menon, P. Susheela
Maya Machindra	Indian	A. R. Rahman	S. P. Balasubrahmanyam, Swarnalatha
Nenje Nenje	Ratchagan	A. R. Rahman	K. J. Yesudas, Sadhana Sargam
Aathangara Marame	Kizhakku Cheemayile	A. R. Rahman	Mano, Sujatha Mohan
Adi Nenthikkitten	Star	A. R. Rahman	Karthik, Chitra Sivaraman
Sandakkozhi	Aaytha Ezhuthu	A. R. Rahman	Madhushree, A.R.Rahman
Kummi Adi	Sillunu Oru Kaadhal	A. R. Rahman	Sirkazhi G. Sivachidambaram, Swarnalatha, Naresh Iyer, Theni Kunjarammal, Vignesh, Chorus
Maduraikku Pogathadee	Azhagiya Tamil Magan	A. R. Rahman	Benny Dayal, Archith, Darshana KT
Putham Puthu Olai	Vedham Pudhithu	Devendran	K. S. Chithra
Pullankuzhal Mozhi Tamil	Oorum Uravum	Shankar–Ganesh	S. P. Balasubrahmanyam, Vani Jairam
Kambangade Kambangade	Vaaname Ellai	Maragadha Mani	Maragadha Mani, K. S. Chithra
Vannathi Poochi	Paatti Sollai Thattathe	Chandrabose	S. P. Balasubrahmanyam, K. S. Chithra
Aathu Mettu Thopukulle	Manasukketha Maharasa	Deva	S. P. Balasubrahmanyam, P. Susheela
Vayakkaadu	Parambarai	Deva	Mano, K. S. Chithra
Kannukulle	Dhill	Vidyasagar	Manikka Vinayagam
Lesa Lesa	Lesa Lesa	Harris Jayaraj	Anuradha Sriram

== Notable songs ==
1. Kuch To Log Kahenge
2. Tere Mere Milan Ki Ye Raina
3. Mora Saiyyan Mose Bole
4. Vaishnava Jana To (in Mishra Khamaj)

== Sources ==
- Bor, Joep; Rao, Suvarnalata (1999). The Raga Guide: A Survey of 74 Hindustani Ragas. Nimbus Records with Rotterdam Conservatory of Music. p. 100. ISBN 9780954397609.
- Khamāj Rāga (Hin), The Oxford Encyclopaedia of the Music of India. Oxford University Press. ISBN 9780195650983.
- http://www.tanarang.com/english/khamaj_eng.htm
- https://www.parrikar.org/hindustani/khamaj/
