= Kali Ghata (1980 film) =

- Directed by: Ved Rahi
- Story by: Ved Rahi
- Produced by: Ved Rahi; Shivalik Pictures
- Starring: Rekha; Shashi Kapoor; Danny Denzongpa
- Cinematography: Kay Gee
- Edited by: Subhash Gupta
- Music by: Laxmikant-Pyarelal
- Release date: 25 January 1980
- Country: India
- Language: Hindi

Kali Ghata (Hindi: काली घटा; transliteration: Black Cloud) is a 1980 Hindi romantic thriller film produced and directed by Ved Rahi, it stars Rekha (in Double Roles), Shashi Kapoor, Danny Denzongpa in lead roles, along with Aruna Irani, Jagdeep, Lalita Pawar, Nazir Hussain, A. K. Hangal in supporting roles. The music was composed by Laxmikant-Pyarelal, with lyrics written by Anand Bakshi.

== Plot ==
Rai Bahadur Satpal Singh (Nazir Hussain) is killed cold-blooded in a remote village. He is survived by his twin daughters Rekha and Rashmi (both played by Rekha).

Rekha manages their business with the help of their chief estate manager Diwan (A. K. Hangal), along with his son and factory manager Kishore (Danny Denzongpa). Rashmi and Kishore are in love with each other which displeases Rekha, who sends Rashmi abroad to attend a painting course. On the other hand, Rekha too is disinterested about her marriage.

Meanwhile, driving through their estate, Rekha's car breaks down and is helped by Prem (Shashi Kapoor), with a golden hand for such machines. After few meets, both fall in love with each other. After a few days, Rekha announces her engagement with Prem to the surprise of everyone around. She also wills to assign the entire estate to Rashmi before engagement. During the engagement, when Rekha's Police Inspector friend Vikas shows up to wish the couple good luck for the occasion, Prem is suspiciously found missing. The next evening, the couple go out to spend private time on a house-boat anchored in a lake on their estate.

Later in the stormy night, Rekha finds Prem missing from the boat and starts looking for him. While searching, someone pushes her in the lake, but not before Rekha glimpses the shadow of this person. Everyone at the estate is surprised with the news of Rekha's death. Meanwhile, she survives and reaches the house of her friend Pinky (Aruna Irani). Once there, Rekha learns about Rashmi's arrival for Rekha's funeral and both plan to investigate the incident.

On the other hand, Kishore, Prem and the Police too start their investigation separately to unmask the killer. Meanwhile, when Rashmi (Rekha disguised herself) meets him, Prem discloses the intense love for Rekha. She finds quite a few on her suspect list. Kishore, who is willing to go to any extent to marry Rashmi. Prem, for his suspicious movements. The staff at their estate, like the cook (Jagdeep), house keeper Amba (Lalita Pawar) et al. The story progresses and after a few thrilling sequences, the murderer is revealed in the climax.

== Cast ==
- Rekha as Rekha / Rashmi (Double Role)
- Shashi Kapoor as Prem
- Danny Denzongpa as Kishore
- Aruna Irani as Pinky
- A. K. Hangal as Diwan
- Jagdeep as Cook
- Nazir Hussain as Rai Bahadur Satpal Singh
- Lalita Pawar as Amba
- Raj Mehra as CBI Inspector
- Pinchoo Kapoor as Prem's Father
- Urmila Bhatt as Prem's Mother

== Crew ==
- Direction – Ved Rahi
- Story – Ved Rahi
- Production – Ved Rahi
- Production Company – Shivalik Pictures
- Editing – Subhash Gupta
- Cinematography – Kay Gee
- Art Direction – Sudhendu Roy
- Choreography – Kiran Kumar, Oscar, Robert, Suresh Bhatt, Vijay
- Music Direction – Laxmikant Pyarelal
- Lyrics – Anand Bakshi
- Playback – Asha Bhosle, Hemlata, Lata Mangeshkar, Mohammad Rafi

== Soundtrack ==
Lyrics: Anand Bakshi

| Song | Singer | Raga |
|---|---|---|
| "Kali Ghata Chhayi" | Lata Mangeshkar | Bibhas & Bilaval |
| "Kali Ghata Chhayi" | Mohammed Rafi | Bibhas & Bilaval |
| "Janewalon Ka Gham To" | Mohammed Rafi | |
| "Tu Chali Aa, Chali Aa Meri Mehbooba" | Mohammed Rafi, Asha Bhosle | |
| "Nainon Ki Khidki" | Asha Bhosle | |
| "O Piya Bahroopiya" | Asha Bhosle | |
| "Mohabbat Ek Vaada Hai, Yeh Vaada Tod Mat Jana" | Asha Bhosle, Hemlata | |
