= Bilaval =

Hindustani raga

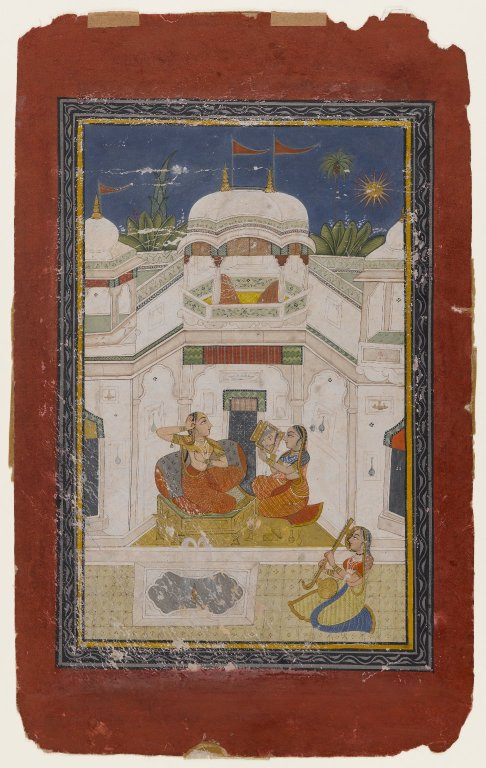
- Thaat: Bilaval
- Type: Sampurna (7 by 7 )
- Arohana: Sa Re Ga ma, Ga Pa, Ni Dha Ni Sa'
- Avarohana: Sa' Ni Dha, Pa, ma Ga, ma Re Sa
- Pakad: Ga Re, Ga Pa Dha Pa, ma Ga, ma Re Sa; Ga Re Ga Pa, Dha Ni Sa'; Sa' Ni Dha Pa, ma Ga Ma Re Sa
- Vadi: Dha
- Samavadi: Ga
- Synonym: Bilawal
- Equivalent: Sankarabharanam; Ionian mode

Bilaval or Bilawal (IAST: Bilāval) is a raga and the basis for the eponymous thaat (musical mode) in Hindustani classical music. Raga Bilaval is named after Veraval, Gujarat.

Bilaval has been the standard for North Indian music since the early 19th century. Its tonal relationships are comparable to the Western music C major scale. Bilaval appears in the Ragamala as a ragini of Bhairav but today it is the head of the Bilaval thaat. The Ragamala names Bilaval as a Putra (son) of Bhairav but no relationship between these two ragas are made today. Bilaval is a morning raga that is intended to be sung with a feeling of deep devotion and repose and is often performed during the hot months. The Bilaval is equivalent to the Carnatic raga melakarta, Sankarabharanam, as well as the Western Ionian mode (major scale), and contains the notes S R G M P D N S'. The pitches of Bilaval thaat are all shuddha (natural). Flat (komal) or sharp (tivra) pitches always occur regarding the interval pattern in Bilaval thaat.

Bilaval raga is in the Sikh tradition of northern India and is part of the 11th Sikh Guru, the Sri Guru Granth Sahib. Every raga has a set of strict rules that govern the number of notes that can be used, which notes can be used, and their interplay that must be adhered to for the composition of a tune. Bilaval is the thirty-fourth raga to appear in the series of sixty compositions in the Sri Guru Granth Sahib. The composition in this raga appears on 64 pages from page numbers 795 to 859.

== Aroha and avaroha ==
Arohana/Arohi: Sa, Re, Ga, ma, Pa, Dha, Ni, Sa'

Avrohana/Avarahi: Sa' Ni Dha, Pa, ma Ga, Ma, Re Sa

== Vadi and samavadi ==
Vadi: Dha

Samavadi: Ga

== Pakad or chalan ==
1. Ga Re, Ga Ma Dha Pa, Ma Ga, Ma Re Sa
2. Ga Pa Ni Dha Ni Sa
3. Ga Re Ga Pa, Ni Dha Ni Sa
4. Sa Ni Dha Pa Ga Ma Re Sa
5. Ga Re Ga Pa Dha Ni Dha Ni Sa
6. Ga Re Ga Pa, Dha, Ni, Sa

== Samay (time) ==
Morning: First pahar of the day (4-7 AM)

== Film songs in Tamil ==
Song	Movie	Composer	Singer
"Chandrodhayam Idhile"	Kannagi	S.V. Venkatraman	P.U. Chinnappa
"Madi Meethu"	Annai Illam	K V Mahadevan	T. M. Soundararajan, P. Susheela
"Manam Padaithen"	Kandhan Karunai	K V Mahadevan	P. Susheela
"Aththaan En Aththaan"	Paava Mannippu	Viswanathan–Ramamoorthy	P. Susheela
"Kaadhellenum Vadivam Kanden"	Bhagyalakshmi	Viswanathan–Ramamoorthy	P. Susheela
"Kaana Vandha Kaatchiyenna"	Bhagyalakshmi	Viswanathan–Ramamoorthy	P. Susheela
"Enna Enna Vaarththaigalo"	Vennira Aadai	Viswanathan–Ramamoorthy	P. Susheela
"Ore Raagam Ore Thaalam"	Manapanthal	Viswanathan–Ramamoorthy	P. Susheela
"Kaatru Vandhal"	Kathiruntha Kangal	Viswanathan–Ramamoorthy	P.B. Sreenivas, P. Susheela
"Kanpadume Pirar Kanpadume"	Kathiruntha Kangal	Viswanathan–Ramamoorthy	P. B. Sreenivas
"Paadadha Paatellam"	Veerathirumagan	Viswanathan–Ramamoorthy	P. B. Sreenivas
"Maadi Mele Maadikati"	Kadhalikka Neramillai	Viswanathan–Ramamoorthy	P. B. Sreenivas
"Enna Paarvai"	Kadhalikka Neramillai	Viswanathan–Ramamoorthy	K.J. Yesudas, P. Susheela
"Kaadhalika Neramillai"	Kadhalikka Neramillai	Viswanathan–Ramamoorthy	Sirkazhi Govindarajan
"Roja Malare Raajakumari"	Veerathirumagan	Viswanathan–Ramamoorthy	P. B. Sreenivas, P. Susheela
"Poga Poga Theriyum"	Server Sundaram	Viswanathan–Ramamoorthy	P. B. Sreenivas, P. Susheela
"Andru Vandhadhum"	Periya Idathu Penn	Viswanathan–Ramamoorthy	T.M. Soundararajan, P. Susheela
"Naan Maanthoppil"	Enga Veettu Pillai	Viswanathan–Ramamoorthy	T.M. Soundararajan, P. Susheela
"Aandavan Padachan"	Nichaya Thaamboolam	Viswanathan–Ramamoorthy	T.M. Soundararajan
"Adho Andha Paravai Pola"	Aayirathil Oruvan	Viswanathan–Ramamoorthy	T.M. Soundararajan
"Naan Kavignanum Ilai"	Padithal Mattum Podhuma	Viswanathan–Ramamoorthy	T.M. Soundararajan
"Moondrezhuthil En Moochu"	Dheiva Thaai	Viswanathan–Ramamoorthy	T.M. Soundararajan
"Kadhal Embadhu"	Paadha Kaanikkai	Viswanathan–Ramamoorthy	P.B. Sreenivas, P. Susheela, L.R. Eswari, J.P. Chandrababu
"Epo Vechikalam"	Bandha Pasam	Viswanathan–Ramamoorthy	J.P. Chandrababu
"Enna Paravai Sirakadithu"	Karthigai Deepam	R. Sudarsanam	T.M. Soundararajan(ver 1), P. Susheela(ver 2)
"Pudhu Naadagathil"	Ooty Varai Uravu	M. S. Viswanathan	T. M. Soundararajan
"Kettavarellam Paadalam"	Thangai	M. S. Viswanathan	T. M. Soundararajan
"Anubhavi Raja Anubhavi"	Anubavi Raja Anubavi	M. S. Viswanathan	P. Susheela, L.R. Eswari
"Maanendru Pennukoru"	Anubavi Raja Anubavi	M. S. Viswanathan	P. Susheela
"Naan Paadum Paatile"	Bhavani	M. S. Viswanathan	P. Susheela
"Love Birds"	Anbe Vaa	M. S. Viswanathan	P. Susheela
"Maharaja Oru Maharaani"	Iru Malargal	M. S. Viswanathan	T.M. Soundararajan, Shoba Chandrasekhar
"Enni Irundhadhu" (Ragam Neelambari Touches)	Andha 7 Naatkal	M. S. Viswanathan	Malaysia Vasudevan, Vani Jairam
"Vidiya Vidiya Solli"	Pokkiri Raja	M. S. Viswanathan	S.P. Balasubrahmanyam, P. Susheela
"Dil Dil Dil Manadhil"	Mella Thirandhathu Kadhavu	M. S. Viswanathan	S.P. Balasubrahmanyam, P. Susheela
"Aadungal Paadungal"	Guru	Ilaiyaraaja	S.P. Balasubrahmanyam
"Pudhucheri Katcheri"	Singaravelan	Ilaiyaraaja	S.P. Balasubrahmanyam
"Thene Thenpaandi"	Udaya Geetham	Ilaiyaraaja	S.P. Balasubrahmanyam
"Nilaave Vaa"	Mouna Ragam	Ilaiyaraaja	S.P. Balasubrahmanyam
"Yerikkarai Poongaatre Nee Pora Vazhi"	Thooral Ninnu Pochchu	Ilaiyaraaja	K.J. Yesudas
"Thaalattudhe Vaanam"	Kadal Meengal	Ilaiyaraaja	P. Jayachandran, S. Janaki
"Pudhu Maapilaiku"	Apoorva Sagodharargal	Ilaiyaraaja	S.P. Balasubrahmanyam, S.P. Sailaja
"Aalapol Vellapol"	Ejamaan	Ilaiyaraaja	S. P. Balasubrahmanyam, K. S. Chithra
"Paarthathenna Paarvai"	Naangal	Ilaiyaraaja	S. P. Balasubrahmanyam, K. S. Chithra
"Indha Minminiku"	Sigappu Rojakkal	Ilaiyaraaja	Malaysia Vasudevan, S. Janaki
"Malaiyaala Karaiyoram"	Rajadhi Raja	Ilaiyaraaja	Mano
"Germaniyin Senthen Malare"	Ullasa Paravaigal	Ilaiyaraaja	S.P. Balasubrahmanyam, S. Janaki
"Anjali Anjali Anjali"	Anjali	Ilaiyaraaja	Sathya, Karthik Raja, Yuvan Shankar Raja, Bhavatharini, Venkat Prabhu, Premji Amaran, Parthi Bhaskar, Hari Bhaskar, Vaishnavi
"Thulli Ezhunthathu"	Geethanjali	Ilaiyaraaja	Ilaiyaraaja
"Kanmani Anbodu Kadhalan"	Gunaa	Ilaiyaraaja	Kamal Haasan, S. Janaki
"Kuzhaloodhum Kannanuku"	Mella Thirandhathu Kadhavu	Ilaiyaraaja	K.S. Chithra
"Dillu Baru Jaane"	Kalaignan	Ilaiyaraaja	Mano, K. S. Chithra
"Nila Kaayum Neeram"	Chembaruthi	Ilaiyaraaja	Mano, S. Janaki
"Paattu Poove"	Chembaruthi	Ilaiyaraaja	Mano, S. Janaki
"April Mayilae"	Idhayam	Ilaiyaraaja	Ilaiyaraaja, Deepan Chakravarthy, S.N.Surendar
"Naan Erikarai"	Chinna Thayee	Ilaiyaraaja	K.J. Yesudas, Swarnalatha
"Maalai En Vethanai"	Sethu	Ilaiyaraaja	Unni Krishnan, Arunmozhi, S.N.Surendar
"Thendrale"	Kadhal Desam	A. R. Rahman	Mano, Unni Krishnan
"O Vennila"	Kadhal Desam	A. R. Rahman	Unni Krishnan
"Kandukondain Kandukondain" (Ragam Nalinakanthi Touches also)	Kandukondain Kandukondain	A. R. Rahman	Hariharan, Mahalakshmi Iyer
"Maanooththu Manthaiyile"	Kizhakku Cheemayile	A. R. Rahman	S.P. Balasubrahmanyam, Sasirekha
"Ini Achcham Achcham Illai"	Indira	A. R. Rahman	Sujatha Mohan, Anuradha Sriram, G.V. Prakash, Shweta Mohan, Esther
"Thoda Thoda Malarndhadhenna"	Indira	A. R. Rahman	S.P. Balasubrahmanyam, K.S. Chithra
"Kangalil Enne"	Uzhavan	A. R. Rahman	S.P. Balasubrahmanyam, K.S. Chithra
"Pennalla Pennalla"	Uzhavan	A. R. Rahman	S.P. Balasubrahmanyam
"Moongilile Paatisaikum Kaatralaiyai"	Raagam Thedum Pallavi	T. Rajendar	S.P. Balasubrahmanyam
"Mazhaiyum Neeye"	Azhagan	Maragadha Mani	S.P. Balasubrahmanyam
"Sa Sa Sa Sani Thapa Niveathaa"	Nee Pathi Naan Pathi	Maragadha Mani	S.P. Balasubrahmanyam
"Naadodi Paattu Paada"	Harichandra	Agosh	S.P. Balasubrahmanyam
"Enna Kathai Solla"	Annanagar Mudhal Theru	Chandrabose	S.P. Balasubrahmanyam, K.S. Chithra
"Shenbaga Poovai"	Paasamalargal	V. S. Narasimhan	S.P. Balasubrahmanyam, Sujatha Mohan
"Nalam Nalamariya Aval"	Kadhal Kottai	Deva	S. P. Balasubrahmanyam, Anuradha Sriram
"Pulveli Pulveli"	Aasai	Deva	K.S. Chithra, Unni Krishnan(Humming only)
"Yeno Yeno"	Appu	Deva	Hariharan, Sujatha, Harini
"Sollathae"	Sollamale	Bobby	Hariharan, K. S. Chithra
"Aval Ulaghazhagi"	Lesa Lesa	Harris Jayaraj	Karthik
"Rakita Rakita Rakita"	Jagame Thanthiram	Santhosh Narayanan	Dhanush, Santhosh Narayanan
"Kadhale Kadhale"	Konjam Koffee Konjam Kaadhal	Phani Kalyan	Prasanna, Neha Nair
