= Jogiya =

Jogiya may refer to:

- Jogiya (album), an album by Gurdas Maan
- Jogiya (raga), a raga in Hindustani classical music
