= Jogiya (raga) =

Raga in Hindustani classical music, based on Bhairav Thaat

- Thaat: Bhairav
- Type: Audhav - Shadhav
- Time of day: Dawn time (Brahma Muhurt)
- Arohana: S Ṟ M P Ḏ N S’; S Ṟ M P Ḏ Ṡ
- Avarohana: Ṡ N Ḏ P M Ṟ S; Ṡ N Ḏ P Ḏ M Ṟ S
- Pakad: Ṟ M M M P Ḏ P Ḏ N Ḏ P P Ḏ M Ṟ S
- Chalan: Ṟ M M M P Ḏ P Ḏ N Ḏ P P Ḏ M Ṟ S
- Vadi: Ma
- Samavadi: Sa

Jogiya, or Jogia, is a raga in Hindustani classical music. It is based on Bhairav Thaat. It is played at the 1st Prahar of the day, dawn time (Brahma Muhurt). The name Jogiya came from Jogi, a colloquial version of the word yogi.

== Nature ==
It lacks Ga. Re-ma and Dha-ma are frequently rendered in Meend.

== Raga description ==
Madhyam is powerful, a nyas Swar as well as a Vadi Swara. Jogiya has Rishabha and Dhaivata Komal like Raag Bhairav, however they are not oscillated here (Andolit). In Avroh, Shuddha Nishad is Alp and is always used as a Kan Swar of Komal Dhaivat like: S' (N)d P. Sometimes Komal Nishad is also used as a Kan Swar with Komal Dhaivat like: M P d (n)d M; M r S to enhance the beauty of this Raag. r-M and d-M are rendered in Meend.

== See also ==
- Kirtan
- Taal
