= Dekh Kabira Roya =

- Directed by: Amiya Chakravarty
- Written by: Chandrakant
- Screenplay by: Amiya Chakravarty; Chandrakant
- Story by: Manoranjan Ghose
- Produced by: Amiya Chakravarty
- Starring: Anita Guha; Anoop Kumar; Jawahar Kaul; Ameeta; Daljeet; Shubha Khote
- Cinematography: Ajit Kumar
- Edited by: C. Ramarao
- Music by: Madan Mohan
- Production company: Shrirangam Production
- Distributed by: Shrirangam Production
- Release date: 1957
- Country: India
- Language: Hindi

Dekh Kabira Roya is a 1957 romantic comedy film, directed by Amiya Chakravarty.

The tag line in the title says 'The truth is stranger than fiction. Comedy is exaggeration of truth'.

== Plot summary ==
This Bollywood classic is a farcical comedy about the vicissitudes of modern love. Mohan (Anoop Kumar), Pradeep (Daljit), and Ranjeet (Jawahar Kaul) are three struggling artists—singer, painter, and writer, respectively—who meet at Janta coffee house for the first time . Romantic hijinks ensue when the trio meet three lovely girls, Geeta (Ameeta), Rekha (Anita Guha), and Kalpana (Shubha Khote), with very specific ideas about art and love. The three male friends decide to help each other out by using their talents, and utter and hilarious chaos reigns.

== Cast ==
- Anita Guha as Rekha
- Anoop Kumar as Mohan
- Jawahar Kaul as Pradeep
- Ameeta as Geeta
- Daljeet as Ranjeet
- Shubha Khote as Kalpana
- Shivraj as Rekha's Father
- Parveen Paul as Geeta's Mother
- Sunder as the coffee house waiter who plays a central role in disentangling the situation
- Rirkoo as Arjun, Kalpana's cricket playing brother
- Ratan Gaurang as peon

== Crew ==
Director: Amiya Chakrabarty

Editor: C. Ramarao

Writer: Chandrakant, Amiya Chakrabarty, Manoranjan Ghose

Producer: Amiya Chakrabarty

Music: Madan Mohan

Cinematographer: Ajit Kumar

== Soundtrack ==
The music was composed by Madan Mohan. The songs were penned by Rajendra Krishan. The following is a list of songs featured in this film.

Song	Singer	Raga
"Lagan Tose Lagi Balma"	Lata Mangeshkar	Tilang
"Meri Veena Tum Bin Roye"	Lata Mangeshkar	Ahir Bhairav
"Tu Pyar Kare Ya Thukraye"	Lata Mangeshkar
"Hum Panchhi Mastane, Hum Panchhi Mastane"	Lata Mangeshkar, Geeta Dutt
"Tum Meri Rakho Laj Hari"	Sudha Malhotra
"Ashqon Se Teri Humne"	Asha Bhosle
"Hum Bulate Hi Rahe, Tum Jalate Hi Rahe"	Asha Bhosle, Mohammed Rafi
"Humse Aaya Na Gaya"	Talat Mahmood	Bageshri
"Kaun Aaya Mere Man"	Manna Dey
"Bairan Ho Gayi Rain"	Manna Dey	Jaijaivanti
