= Dil Ek Mandir =

- Poster
- Directed by: C. V. Sridhar
- Written by: Raj Baldev Raj (dialogues)
- Story by: C.V. Sridhar
- Based on: Nenjil Or Aalayam (1962) by C. V. Sridhar
- Starring: Rajendra Kumar; Meena Kumari; Raaj Kumar
- Cinematography: A. Vincent
- Edited by: N. M Shankar
- Music by: Shankar Jaikishan
- Release date: 8 March 1963
- Country: India
- Language: Hindi
- Box office: ₹2.2 crore (equivalent to ₹182 crore or US$19 million in 2023)

Dil Ek Mandir (transl. The heart is a temple) is a 1963 Indian Hindi-language romantic drama film directed by C. V. Sridhar and written by Raj Baldev Raj. The film stars Rajendra Kumar, Meena Kumari, Raaj Kumar and Mehmood. The film's music is by Shankar Jaikishan. All the songs of this film were major hits. The film was a major hit and ranked fifth on the box office collection list. The film is a remake of Sridhar's Tamil film Nenjil Or Aalayam (1962).

== Plot ==
Sita (Meena Kumari) is married to Ram (Raaj Kumar), who is diagnosed to have cancer. Ram is admitted to a hospital where he is to be treated by Dr. Dharmesh (Rajendra Kumar). Dr. Dharmesh is Sita's former love and both of them are very much uncomfortable to interact in front of Sita's husband. Sita suspects that Dr. Dharmesh will not be able to give her husband a fair treatment because of his love interest in her. When she mentions this to him he promises her that he will try his best to save her husband. Ram overhears this conversation and later suggests to Sita that she should marry Dr. Dharmesh after his death. Ram is to undergo a major surgery under Dr. Dharmesh, which will decide his fate. Dr. Dharmesh is seized with a feeling that he can't afford to fail in this surgery, as it might seem that he was biased due to Sita. He works hard for the preparation of the surgery, without proper food/sleep for a long time. Finally, at the end the surgery takes place. Dr. Dharmesh comes out from the operation theatre and tells Sita that the operation was successful and her husband is safe. He takes couple of steps forward and collapses. Long days of hard work for the preparation of surgery takes its toll, and he dies on the spot. The last scene shows Ram and Sita at the inauguration of a hospital built in Dr. Dharmesh's memory. Dr. Dharmesh's mother inaugurates his statue and everybody places flowers there.

== Cast and characters ==
Character	Portrayed By
Dr. Dharmesh	Rajendra Kumar
Sita	Meena Kumari
Ram	Raaj Kumar
Lallu Lal	Mehmood
Uma	Kutty Padmini
Mynavati	Shubha Khote
Philip	Manmohan Krishna
Dharmesh's mother	Achala Sachdev
Peter	Nagesh

== Production ==
Dil Ek Mandir was directed by C. V. Sridhar and remade from his own Tamil film Nenjil Or Aalayam (1962). Meena Kumari learnt to play the sitar for her role. The entire film was completed in 27 days.

== Soundtrack ==
The Music of the film was composed by Shankar–Jaikishan. Songs of this film are considered as classics. Singers like Mohammed Rafi, Lata Mangeshkar And Suman Kalyanpur crooned the songs in the album. Music was a hit after release with songs still remembered till date.

#	Title	Singer(s)	Lyricist	Duration	Raga
1	"Dil Ek Mandir Hai"	Mohammed Rafi, Suman Kalyanpur	Hasrat Jaipuri	04:25	Jogiya (raga)
2	"Tum Sab Ko Chhod Kar"	Mohammed Rafi	Hasrat Jaipuri	04:07	
3	"Hum Tere Pyar Mein"	Lata Mangeshkar	Hasrat Jaipuri	04:47	Tilak Kamod
4	"Ruk Ja Raat"	Lata Mangeshkar	Shailendra	04:13	
5	"Yaad Na Jaye Beete Dinon Ki"	Mohammed Rafi	Shailendra	04:23	Kirwani
6	"O Meri Ladli"	Suman Kalyanpur	Shailendra	04:19	
7	"Paalanhaare Ram Hai" (Bhajan)	S. Janaki	Shailendra	02:17	

== Awards ==
At the 11th Filmfare Awards, Raaj Kumar won the Best Supporting Actor Award and Arjun Dev Rashk won Best Dialogue. Kutty Padmini was recognised by Prime Minister Indira Gandhi at her residence along with Rajendra Kumar and Meena Kumari.

Awards	Category	Nominee	Result
11th Filmfare Awards	Best Supporting Actor	Raaj Kumar	Won
11th Filmfare Awards	Best Dialogue	Arjun Dev Rashk	Won
11th Filmfare Awards	Best Movie	C. V. Sridhar	Nominated
11th Filmfare Awards	Best Director	C. V. Sridhar	Nominated
11th Filmfare Awards	Best Story	C. V. Sridhar	Nominated
11th Filmfare Awards	Best Actor	Rajendra Kumar	Nominated
11th Filmfare Awards	Best Actress	Meena Kumari	Nominated
11th Filmfare Awards	Best Music Director	Shankar–Jaikishan	Nominated

== Reception ==
Sports and Pastime wrote, "The subject of a love triangle and a doctor's supreme sacrifice in the pursuit of his ideals is not new on the Indian screen [..] but [..] director Sridhar presents this seemingly familiar plot with a zest and suspense that evoke praise".
