= Sadra (music) =

- Stylistic origins: Northern India
- Cultural origins: Mughal period
- Typical instruments: Tabla, Tanpura

Other topics
- Dhrupad, Khyal, Hindustani classical music

Sadra (also spelled Sadarang or Shadra) is a vocal genre of Hindustani classical music from the Indian subcontinent. It represents a transitional form between the ancient Dhrupad and the more contemporary Khyal styles, combining elements from both traditions.

== Characteristics ==
=== Rhythmic Structure ===
Compositions that exist in specific meters (tala) are classified as Sadra. The primary talas used include:

- Teevra taal (7 beats)
- Sool taal (10 beats)
- Chau taal (12 beats)
- Jhaptal (10 beats) - the most commonly used tala for Sadra performances

The rhythmic complexity of Sadra incorporates layakari (rhythmic play) derived from Dhrupad tradition, making it distinctive among Hindustani vocal forms.

=== Musical Style ===
Sadra represents a synthesis of classical vocal traditions. It combines the dignified bol baat (syllabic articulation) characteristic of Dhrupad with the melodic ornamentation and taan (rapid melodic passages) and sargam (solfa singing) found in Khyal. This unique combination gives Sadra a distinctive identity within the spectrum of Hindustani classical music forms.

The compositional structure typically includes:

- Sthayi - the initial section set in the lower and middle octaves
- Antara - the second section exploring higher octaves
- Elaborate rhythmic variations and improvisation

== Historical Context ==
Sadra emerged during a period of significant evolution in North Indian classical music, particularly during and after the Mughal period, when various musical forms were being refined and new styles were developing. As Khyal gained prominence and began to eclipse the older Dhrupad tradition, Sadra served as an important bridge between these two major vocal styles.

== See also ==
- Dhrupad
- Khyal
- Dhamar
- Tarana
- Hindustani classical music
- Tala (music)
