= Prahara =

Time division system

Prahara is a Sanskrit term for a unit of time, or subdivision of the day, approximately three hours long.

== Definition ==
The day is divided into eight parts: four praharas for the day, and four for the night. The first prahara of the day begins at sunrise, and the fourth prahara of the day ends at sunset. A second round of four praharas unfolds during the night, between sunset and sunrise.

The traditional system of praharas overlaps with the traditional system of muhurtas also, which is based on precise astronomical calculations.

Thus, the day can be regarded as divided into eight praharas (of three hours each) or thirty muhurtas (of 48 minutes each). In both systems, the day commences with sunrise. The timing of the two systems coincides only at sunrise and sunset (four praharas coincide with fifteen muhurtas at the twelve-hour, or 720-minute, point).

== History ==
In the ancient Puranas, the day is divided into eight praharas: four for the day and four for the night. The concept still prevails today in India, particularly in connection with the performance of Indian classical music (see below).

== Timing ==
The first prahara is commonly placed at sunrise, although some sources place it at the brahma-muhurta, a period of time before sunrise (around 4:30 am when Venus can be sighted).

The concept of prahar originated where the lengths of the day and night were based on actual, observable sunrise and sunset. The four praharas of the day start at sunrise, and the four praharas of the night at sunset. If the location is near the equator, where day and night are the same length year round, the praharas of the day and the praharas of the night will be of equal length (three hours each). In other regions, where the relative length of day and night varies according to the season, the praharas of the day will be longer or shorter than the praharas of the night.

Contemporary discussions of prahara often use 7:00 am (the time of sunrise at the equator and at the equinoxes) as a theoretical fixed point of reference for mapping out the praharas at three-hour intervals (07-10, 10–13, etc.). This scheme is a useful pedagogical tool and an efficient way of applying the concept of prahara in a technological "clock" culture. However, this rigid schema most likely does not capture the original application of prahara. In a traditional, non-technological culture, the length of day and night are based on observable sunrise and sunset. The day, which starts at sunrise and ends at sunset, is divided into four praharas of equal length; and, the night, which starts at sunset and ends at sunrise, is also divided into four equal watches. During the summer, when the days are longer than the nights, the praharas of the day will be longer than the praharas of the night, and vice versa during the winter.

The question of how to handle the praharas when days and nights are unequal in length is critical for timing the performance of ragas, since each raga is ideally performed during a certain prahara.

Based on the contemporary operational concept of prahara based on the hour or time of day the following scheme has been in use for sometime in performing rituals in most of India east of Bengal:

1. 1st Prahara of the Day (Brahmi Muhoorta): 3 am up to 6 am: Used for completing snaanam, Sandhyaa-Vandanam at sun-rise, and to determine tithi of the day at sunrise. Sunrises during this Prahara in almost all of the Indian subcontinent (Bharat Bhumi or Bharata Khanda). In practice, most people wake up only after 4.30 am and pursue their morning chores.
2. 2nd Prahara of the Day (Praat: Kaala): 6 am up to 9 am: Used for performing various poojas based on the tithi of the day at sunrise.
3. 3rd Prahara of the Day (Aparaahnam): 9 am up to 12 pm: Used for performing Apara Karmas based on the tithi of the day at Aparahnam. The time around noon and thereafter is also called Do-Pehar in Hindi and similarly in some other Indian languages because colloquially this time is considered the 2nd Prahara coming after the morning.
4. 4th Prahara of the Day (Madhyaahnam): 12 pm up to 3 pm: Used for eating Lunch (Bhojanam) and taking rest (siesta). Most temples are usually closed during this time. The time around noon and thereafter is also called Do-Pehar in Hindi and similarly in some other Indian languages colloquially.
5. 5th Prahara of the Day (Saayam Kaala): 3 pm to 6 pm: Used for snaanam again, followed by Sandhya-Vandanam, and performing evening poojas, aarati and other functions. Most temples re-open during this time.
6. 6th Prahara of the Day(1st of the Night) (Ratri: 6 pm to 9 pm: Used for having dinner (or alpaahaaram a.k.a. mini dinner), and any early night functions, poojas and celebrations. Temples close by 10 pm except on some occasions like Siva-Ratri.
7. 7th Prahara of the Day(2nd of the Night) (Ratri): 9 pm to 12 am (Ardha-Ratri): Sleep time or time for other activities. Typically, 1 am is termed Ardha-Ratri, although there is no single definition of Ardha-Ratri which is used to imply the 'middle of the night'.
8. 8th Prahara of the Day(3rd of the Night)(Ratri): 12 am to 3 am: Sleep time.

While it is considered that there are 4 Praharas in the night, in practice with the inclusion of Brahmi Muhoorta into the Day hours, there are 5 praharas during the day and 3 during the night in contemporary life, each of 3 hours, and this seems to be the convention in practice irrespective of what the theories in books say. Besides, the sun rises before 7.00am on almost all days of the year in most of Bhaarat bhumi (Indian sub-continent) based on the Indian Standard Time (IST). Furthermore, humans who are not babies, on average, sleep for fewer hours than 12 in any given day, independent of seasons.

This is the typical schedule in the contemporary life of people in India (Bharat) subject to the length of the day as per season. Everyone is not required to follow this scheme and many do not. Also, some people may skip certain rituals or perform other activities as is suitable for them. Brahmi Muhoorta is considered the time the gods/devas appear to bless humans, and hence a special significance is attached to this prahara before sunrise. People from the north-east of India start their day much earlier because sun rises in those parts as early as 4.30am IST and sets as early as 5pm IST in some seasons, however, this does not contradict the contemporary operational scheme in practice.

== Indian classical music ==
Some ragas of the Indian classical music are prescribed to be performed at a particular prahara to maximize their aesthetic effects (see samayā). Perhaps the earliest mention of the relation between raga and time is Narada's Sangita Makaranda, written sometime between the 7th and 11th century, which warns musicians against playing ragas at the incorrect time of day. Pandit V.N. Bhatkhande (1860-1936), who formulated the modern system of Indian musical thāt, states that the correct time (or prahara) to play a raga has a relation to its thāt.

== Modern etymology and usage ==
The word is commonly used in India, Pakistan, Nepal is prahar (Hindi/Nepali प्रहर, Urduپہر), more commonly pronounced paher or peher and in West Bengal and Bangladesh is prohor (Bengali প্রহর) in Marathi it is pronounced as Prahar (प्रहर). In Hindi and Urdu the word for "afternoon" is dopahar (= two prahars). In Bengali the corresponding word is dui-pôhor or more commonly dupur. In Marathi, afternoon is Dupaar with same etymology as in Hindi. It is known as Paar in, Konkani, where First Prahara is known as Faantya Paar (from Sanskrit, प्रातः प्रहर), and afternoon is known as Donpaar.
