= Bhairav (thaat) =

Hindustani music thaat

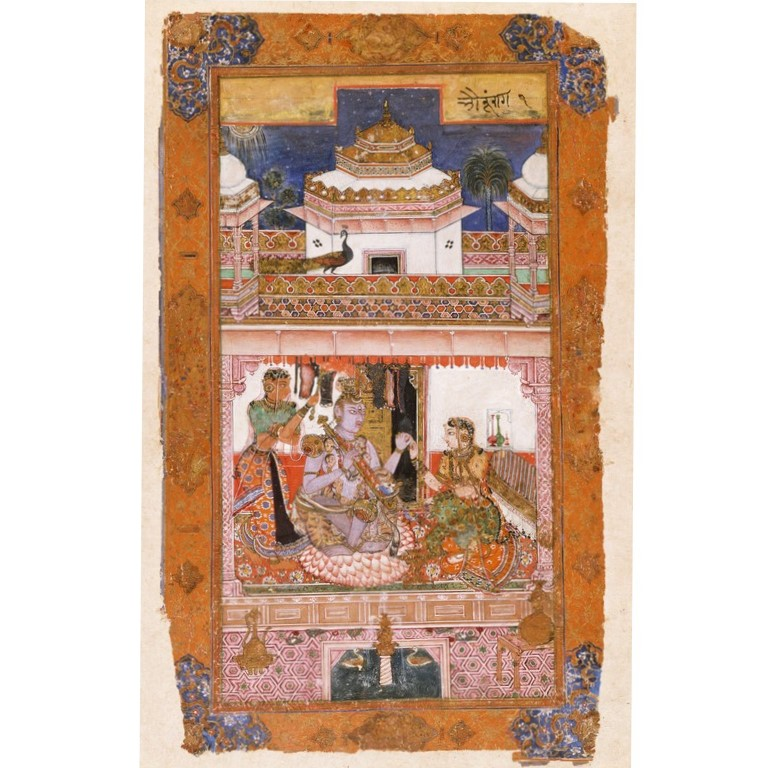
Bhairava raga by Mir Sayyid Ali, Chunar, 1591

Bhairav is one of the ten basic thaats of Hindustani music from the Indian subcontinent. It is also the name of a raga within this thaat. But there is no connection in the similarity between in the names of the thaat and the raga.

This thaat is different from, and should not be confused with the Bhairavi thaat, and its derived raga of the same name

== Description ==
Ragas of the Bhairav thaat make use of Komal Rishabh and Komal Dhaivat. Bhairava is one of the names of Shiva especially in his powerful form as a naked ascetic with matted locks and body smeared with ashes. The ragas too have some of these masculine and ascetic attributes in its form and compositions.

The Bhairav raga itself is extremely vast and allows a huge number of note combinations and a great range of emotional qualities from valour to peace. There are many variations based on it including (but not restricted to) Ahir Bhairav, Alam Bhairav, Anand Bhairav, Bairagi Bhairav, Beehad Bhairav, Bhavmat Bhairav, Devata Bhairav, Gauri Bhairav, Nat Bhairav, Shivmat Bhairav.

== Ragas ==
Ragas belonging to the Bhairav thaat include:

- Basant Mukhari
- Bhairav Bahar
- Bhairav
- Bibhas
- Ramkali
- Gunkali
- Jogiya
- Zeelaf
- Saurashtra Bhairav
- Bangal Bhairav
- Komal Bhairav
- Mangal Bhairav
- Ahir Bhairav
- Alam Bhairav
- Anand Bhairav
- Bairagi Bhairav
- Beehad Bhairav
- Kaushi Bhairav
- Bhavmat Bhairav
- Devata Bhairav
- Gauri Bhairav
- Nat Bhairav
- Shivmat Bhairav
- Bhatiyari Bhairav
- Virat Bhairav
- Kabiri Bhairav
- Prabhat Bhairav
- Roopkali
- Bakula Bhairav
- Hussaini Bhairav
- Kalingda
- Devaranjani
- Asa Bhairav
- Jaun Bhairav
- Mand Bhairav
