= Samayā =

Sanskrit term for time

Samaya (Sanskrit: समय, romanized: Samayā, lit. 'Time') or Samayam (Sanskrit: समयम्, romanized: Samayaṃ) is a Sanskrit term referring to the "appointed or proper time, [the] right moment for doing anything." In Indian languages, samayam, or samay in Indo-Aryan languages, is a unit of time.

In contemporary usage, samayam means time in Dravidian languages such as Kannada, Malayalam, and Tamil, and samay in Indo-Aryan languages such as Bengali, Hindi, Marathi, Gujarati.

== Uses ==
Samayam is a term used in Indian classical music to loosely categorize ragas into times of day. Each raga has a specific period of the day (praharam) when it is performed.

In the Gandharva Veda, the day is divided into three-hour intervals: 4–7 a.m., 7–10 a.m., etc. The time concept in the Gandharva Veda is more strictly-adhered to than it would be, for example, in Carnatic music.

The samayachakra is a concept that states that time moves in a cyclic manner rather than in a linear manner.

=== Jainism ===
Samaya represents the most infinitesimal part of time that cannot be divided further. The blink of an eye, or about a quarter of a second, has innumerable samaya in it. For all practical purposes a second happens to be the finest measurement of time. Jainism, however, recognizes a very small measurement of time known as samaya, which is an infinitely small part of a second.

A samaya is the amount of time it takes for the soul of an arihant to travel to the Siddhashila (highest realm in the universe) after reaching the stage of moksha (liberation).

=== Hinduism ===
Samayam is stated to be an epithet of Shiva in the Agni Purana.

== See also ==
- Hindu cosmology
- Jain cosmology
- Palya
- Hasta
- Religious cosmology
- Kairos
- Instant
