= Harikambhoji =

28th raga in the Melakarta

- Arohanam: S R₂ G₃ M₁ P D₂ N₂ Ṡ
- Avarohanam: Ṡ N₂ D₂ P M₁ G₃ R₂ S
- Equivalent: Mixolydian mode

Harikambhoji (pronounced harikāmbhōji) is a rāgam in Carnatic music (musical scale of South Indian classical music). It is the 28th Melakarta rāgam (parent scale) in the 72 melakarta rāgam system.

One of the first scales employed by the ancient Tamils (3rd century BCE) was the Mullaipann, a pentatonic scale composed of the notes sa ri ga pa da, equivalent to C, D, E, G and A in the western notations. These fully harmonic scales, constitutes the raga Mohanam in the Carnatic music style. Mullaipann further evolved into Sempaalai, a scale based on seven notes by the addition of two more notes, ma and ni to the pentatonic scale. Sempaalai pann corresponds to the Carnatic raga Harikambhoji.

Khamaj thaat of Hindustani Music is the equivalent to this rāgam. It is known as Harikedāragowla in the Muthuswami Dikshitar school of music.

In Western music, Mixolydian mode is this raga's equivalent.

== Structure and Lakshana ==
Harikambhoji scale with Shadjam at C

It is the 4th rāgam in the 5th chakra Bana. The mnemonic name is Bana-Bhu. The mnemonic phrase is sa ri ga ma pa dha ni sa. Its ārohaṇa-avarohaṇa structure is as follows (see swaras in Carnatic music for details on below notation and terms):

- ārohaṇa : S R₂ G₃ M₁ P D₂ N₂ Ṡ (Note: Alternate notations: Hindustani: S R G M P D Ṉ Ṡ; Western: C D E F G A B♭ C)
- avarohaṇa : Ṡ N₂ D₂ P M₁ G₃ R₂ S (Note: Alternate notations: Hindustani: Ṡ Ṉ D P M G R S; Western: C B♭ A G F E D C)

(notes used in this scale are chatushruti rishabham, antara gandharam, shuddha madhyamam, chatushruti daivatam, kaishiki nishadham)

It is a sampoorna rāgam – rāgam having all 7 swarams. It is the shuddha madhyamam equivalent of Vachaspati, which is the 64th melakarta.

== Janya rāgams ==
Harikambhoji has a lot of janya rāgams (derived rāgams) associated with it, of which Kambhoji is by far the most famous and frequently sung in concerts. The globally famous pentatonic scale Mohanam is also considered a janya of this rāgam. Andolika (also considered as janya of Kharaharapriya), Kamas, Pashupatipriya, Kedaragaula, Natakurinji, Navarasa kannada, Sahana, Senchuruti, Surutti and Yadukula kambhoji are also very popular janyas.

See List of janya rāgams for a full list of Harikambhoji's janya rāgams.
