= Chalan (music) =

Series of note patterns in Hindustani music

In Hindustani music, a Chalan is an extensive series of note patterns which summarises the development of a particular raga. It discloses the basic grammar of the raga and provides a treatment and melodic context of each tone.

Chalan is the movement of a raga or development of a raga while performing Alap. It may also refer to a Pakad of a raga. (Note: Chalan is mostly similar to the Pakad of a raga)

For example, the Chalan of the Kedar (raga) is सा म ग प मे (tivra) म रे सा |

Beneath are some Chalans of different ragas for better understanding:

- Bridabani Sarang - Ni Sa Re Ma Re Pa Ma Re Ni Sa
- Sohni - Sa Ni Dha, Ga Ma# Dha Ga Ma# Ga
- Ahir Bhairav - S r G M G M r ṇ Ḍ ṇ r S

== See also ==
- Pakad
