= Thaat =

Mode in North Indian or Hindustani music

A thaat (IAST: thāṭ) is a "parent scale" in North Indian or Hindustani music. It is the Hindustani equivalent of the term Melakartha raga of Carnatic music. The concept of the thaat is not exactly equivalent to the western musical scale because the primary function of a thaat is not as a tool for music composition, but rather as a basis for classification of ragas. There is not necessarily strict compliance between a raga and its parent thaat; a raga said to 'belong' to a certain thaat need not allow all the notes of the thaat, and might allow other notes. Thaats are generally accepted to be heptatonic by definition.

The term thaat is also used to refer to the frets of stringed instruments like the sitar and the veena. It is also used to denote the posture adopted by a Kathak dancer at the beginning of their performance.

== History ==
The modern thaat system was created by Vishnu Narayan Bhatkhande (1860–1936), an influential musicologist in the field of classical music in the early decades of the twentieth century. Bhatkhande modelled his system after the Carnatic melakarta classification, devised around 1640 by the musicologist Vidwan Venkatamakhin. Bhatkhande visited many of the gharanas (schools) of classical music, conducting a detailed analysis of ragas. His research led him to a system of thirty-two thaats, each named after a prominent raga associated with it. Out of those thirty-two thaats, more than a dozen thaats were popular during his time; however, he chose to highlight only ten such thaats.

According to Bhatkhande, each one of the several traditional ragas is based on, or is a variation of, ten basic thaats, or musical scales or frameworks. The ten thaats are Bilawal, Kalyan, Khamaj, Bhairav, Poorvi, Marwa, Kafi, Asavari, Bhairavi and Todi; if one were to pick a raga at random, in theory it should be possible to classify it into one of these thaats. For instance, the ragas Shree and Puriya Dhanashree are based on the Poorvi thaats, Malkauns on the Bhairavi thaat, and Darbari Kanada on the Asavari thaat.

== System ==
In Indian classical music, musical notes are called swaras. The seven basic swaras of the scale are named shadja, rishabh, gandhar, madhyam, pancham, dhaivat and nishad, and are abbreviated to Sa, Ri (Carnatic) or Re (Hindustani), Ga, Ma, Pa, Dha, and Ni and written S, R, G, M, P, D, N. Collectively these notes are known as the sargam (the word is an acronym of the consonants of the first four swaras). Sargam is the Indian equivalent to solfège, a technique for the teaching of sight-singing. The tone Sa is not associated with any particular pitch. As in Western moveable solfège, Sa refers to the tonic of a piece or scale rather than to any particular pitch.

In Bhatkhande's system, the basic mode of reference is that which is equivalent to the Western Ionian mode or major scale (called Bilawal thaat in Hindustani music, Dheerasankarabharanam in Carnatic). The flattening or sharpening of pitches always occurs with reference to the interval pattern in Bilawal thaat. Each thaat contains a different combination of altered (vikrt) and natural (shuddha) notes with respect to the Bilawal thaat. In any seven-tone scale (starting with S), R, G, D, and N can be natural (shuddha, lit. "pure") or flat (komal, lit. "soft") but never sharp, whereas the M can be natural or sharp (tivra, lit. "fast") but never flat, making twelve notes as in the Western chromatic scale. The sharp or flat tones are called vikrt swara (vikrt, lit. "altered"). Selecting seven tones in ascending order, where S and P are always natural whereas five other tones (R, G, M, D, N) can assume only one of its two possible forms, results in 2^{5} = 32 possible modes which are known as thaats. Out of these thirty-two possibilities, Bhatkhande chose to highlight only ten thaats prominent in his days.

In effect only heptatonic scales are called thaats. Bhatkhande applied the term thaats only to scales that fulfil the following rules:

- A thaat must have seven tones out of the twelve tones [seven natural, four flat (Re, Ga, Dha, Ni), one sharp (Ma)]
- The tones must be in ascending sequence: Sa Re Ga Ma Pa Dha Ni
- A thaat cannot contain both the natural and altered versions of a note
- A thaat, unlike a raga, does not have separate ascending and descending lines
- A thaat has no emotional quality (which ragas, by definition, do have)
- Thaats are not sung but the ragas produced from the thaats are sung

One can arbitrarily designate any pitch as Sa (the tonic) and build the series from there. While all thaats contain seven notes, many ragas (of the audav and shadav type) contain fewer than seven and some use more. A raga need not to use every tone in a given thaat; the assignment is made according to whatever notes the raga does contain (but see note 5). The relatively small number of thaats reflects Bhatkhande's compromise between accuracy and efficiency: the degree of fit between a raga and its thaat is balanced with the desire to keep the number of basic thaats small. Ambiguities inevitably arise. For example, Raga Hindol, assigned to Kalyan thaat, uses the notes S G M D N, which are also found in Marwa thaat. Jaijaiwanti contains both shuddha Ni and komal Ni (and sometimes both versions of Ga as well), which by definition corresponds to no thaat. Bhatkande resolved such cases "by an ad hoc consideration, appealing to musical performance practice" (see Ramesh Gangolli's article, cited in note 4 above).

Note that thaats only give a rough structure of the raga and do not give an idea of how the raga should be sung. It is pakad of the raga that gives the chalan or way of singing of the raga.

== Basic thaats ==
Bhatkhande named his thaats after the prominent ragas associated with those thaats. Ragas on which the thaats are named are called Janak raga of that thaat. For example, Bilaval Thaat is named after the raga Alhaiya Bilaval. Alhaiya Bilaval raga is therefore Janak raga of Bilaval thaat. Ragas other than the Janak raga of a thaat are called Janya raga.

Many thaats correspond to one or other of the European church modes. The thaats are listed here according to their pitches. Lower pitches (komal or flat) are represented with lowercase letters and natural pitches (shuddha or natural) with uppercase letters. A raised pitch (tivra or sharp) is represented by a letter followed by a single quote (i.e. M'). The upper octave is italicized.

| Thaat | Eponymous raga | Notes | Western Notes in C | Western equivalent | Carnatic mela | Distinguishing factor |
|---|---|---|---|---|---|---|
| Bilaval | Bilaval | S R G M P D N S | C D E F G A B C | Ionian | 29th, Sankarabharanam | All Shuddha Svaras |
| Kalyan | Yaman (earlier known as Kalyan) | S R G M' P D N S | C D E F# G A B C | Lydian | 65th, (Mecha) Kalyani | Teevra M |
| Khamaj | Khamaj | S R G M P D n S | C D E F G A Bb C | Mixolydian | 28th, Harikambhoji | Komal n |
| Bhairav | Bhairav | S r G M P d N S | C Db E F G Ab B C | Double Harmonic | 15th, Mayamalavagowla | Komal r, Komal d |
| Kafi | Kafi | S R g M P D n S | C D Eb F G A Bb C | Dorian | 22nd, Kharaharapriya | Komal n, Komal g |
| Asavari | Asavari | S R g M P d n S | C D Eb F G Ab Bb C | Aeolian | 20th, Natabhairavi | Komal n, Komal g, Komal d |
| Bhairavi | Bhairavi | S r g M P d n S | C Db Eb F G Ab Bb C | Phrygian | 8th, Hanumatodi | Komal n, Komal g, Komal d, Komal r |
| Poorvi | Poorvi | S r G M' P d N S | C Db E F# G Ab B C | Double Harmonic #4 | 51st, Kamavardhani | Teevra M, Komal r, Komal d |
| Marva | Marva | S r G M' P D N S | C Db E F# G A B C | Lydian b2 | 53rd, Gamanashrama | Teevra M, Komal r |
| Todi | Miyan ki Todi | S r g M' P d N S | C Db Eb F# G Ab B C | Phrygian #4 #7 | 45th, Shubhapantuvarali | Teevra M, Komal r, Komal g, Komal d |

== Ragas that do not fall in thaat system ==
There are many ragas that do not fall in the thaat system. Some ragas have been derived from Carnatic music and hence do not fall in the Hindustani classical thaat system. Some of them are:

1. Kirvani 2. Nat Bhairav 3. Charukeshi 4. Madhuvanti 5. Ahir Bhairav

== Time of performance ==
Ragas are normally ascribed to certain periods of the day and night (See Samayā). Narada's Sangita-Makaranda, written sometime between the 7th and 11th century, gives warnings to musicians against playing ragas at the incorrect time of day. Traditionally, disastrous consequences are to be expected. Bhatkhande claimed that the correct time to play a raga had a relation to its thaat (and to its vadi).

However, the author of Nai Vaigyanik Paddhati says that the time of a Raga has no importance, especially during meditation by music or during learning or teaching as practiced by the music scholars. Also, it is clear in Bhatkhande Sangeet Shastra at various places that the time do not have any importance while reciting a raga.

== Bibliography ==
- Jairazbhoy, N.A. (1995). The Rags of North Indian Music: Their Structure and Evolution. Bombay: Popular Prakashan.
- Kaufmann, Walter (1968). The Ragas of North India. Calcutta, New Delhi, Bombay: Oxford and IBH Publishing Company.
- Saṅgīt Mahābhāratī (2011). "Thāṭ (of Rāgas)". The Oxford Encyclopaedia of the Music of India. ISBN 978-0-19-565098-3.
