= Pakad =

Musical phrase in Hindustani music

In Hindustani music, a pakad (Hindi: पकड़) is an accepted musical phrase or a set of phrases to encapsulate the essence of a particular raga.

The pakad contains the melodic theme of the raga. In many cases, the ragas contain the same swaras (notes), then the pakad also contains information about gayaki or chalan. The pakad is formed from short convolutions of the arohana and avarohana. The pakad for a particular raga need not be unique, but its sole purpose is to clarify what raga it is.

For example, in a pakad for raga Yaman, a prominent raga from Hindustani music:

Ni* Re Ga Ma# Pa, Ma# Ga Re Sa.

Laya is an important aspect of a Pakad. Lay helps us to place emphasis on specific notes by giving them longer playing time, also to space notes apart. Without spacing, a Raag may fail to show its true characteristics. So Pakad helps better understand a raag.
