= Samavadi =

The samavadi or samvadi is the second-most prominent (though not necessarily second-most played) note of a raga in Indian classical music. The primary note of the raga is the vadi; the vadi and samavadi are in most cases a fourth or fifth apart. Hence, the samavadi of Sa (Shadjam/C) is Pa (Panchamam/G) and the samavadi of Ri (Rishabham/D) is Dha (Dhaivatam/A). The samavadi is the perfect fifth of the vadi.

A samavadi is a note of special significance. Vadi is often translated as the "king" note of a raga, while the samavadi is translated as the "prime minister" or "vizier" note. A performer will typically try to emphasize the samavadi along with the vadi when improvising on a certain raga. The vadi and samavadi can be crucial in defining the raga at hand, and in some cases two ragas with the same arohana and avrohana can be distinguished only by the prominence of their sonant and consonant notes.
