= Vadi (music) =

Vadi, in both Hindustani classical music and Carnatic music, is the tonic (root) swara (musical note) of a given raga (musical scale). "Vadi is the most sonant or most important note of a Raga."
