= Raghupati Raghava Raja Ram =

Devotional song popularised by Gandhi

"Raghupati Raghava Raja Ram" (also called Ram Dhun) is a bhajan (devotional song) widely popularised by Mahatma Gandhi and set to tune by Vishnu Digambar Paluskar in Raga Mishra Gara.

== History ==
=== Origins ===
The precise origins of the song are not entirely clear. It is believed to have been either written by Tulsidas (or based on his work Ramcharitmanas) or based on a 17th-century sung-prayer by the Marathi saint-poet Ramdas.

It is also claimed to have been taken from Nama Ramayana (or Sri Nama Ramayanam), attributed to Lakshmanacharya. Nama Ramayana is a devotional song in Sanskrit, which narrates the Ramayana through the chanting of the many names of Rama. It has 108 verses, commencing with "Shuddha Brahma Paratpara Rama" and each of its lines ending with 'Rama'— only some versions contain the verse "Raghupati Raghava Raja Ram", while others like the rendition by M. S. Subbulakshmi do not.

Anthony Parel writes in Gandhi's Philosophy and the Quest for Harmony,

[T]he origin of Ramdhun is shrouded in legend. According to the legend that he preferred it was composed by the great Hindu poet Tulsidas (1532-1623). While on a pilgrimage visiting the Vishnu temple of Dakore, Northern India, Tulsidas was moved to bargain with Vishnu. Until Vishnu revealed himself as Rama he would not bow his head in prayer. His wish was promptly granted: Rama appeared in his mind with his wife Sita, and three of their devotees. Hence, explains Gandhi, "Ramdhun, meaning intoxication with God [Ram]

=== Gandhi's version ===
There have been many versions of the Ramdhun, and the version that Mahatma Gandhi used had an "ecumenical flavour" to it.

==== Hindu-Muslim unity ====
Gandhi modified the original bhajan, adding that the Ishwar of the Hindus and the Allah of the Muslims were one and the same, to make the song more secular-looking and to spread the message of reconciliation between Hindus and Muslims.

The song was extensively used to project a secular and composite vision of Indian society— it was sung during the 1930 Salt March. After Gandhi's return from Noakhali, he replaced the refrain Bhaj man pyare Sitaram by Bhaj man pyare Rama Rahim, bhaj man pyare Krishna Karim, to better reflect the desired Hindu-Muslim unity.

==== Criticism and objection ====
Some Hindus and Muslims have criticised the changes Gandhi made in his version. Muslims resented it when Gandhi started reciting the bhajan because he had put Allah on par with Ram. Hindus have objected to the "distortion" of the Hindu bhajan due to the addition of Islamic elements in it. Srila Prabhupada was not interested in this version of the Ram Dhun because it had been popularized by Gandhi— who had deviated from the original Dhun, to appease and unite Hindus and Muslims and to gain support of the Indian population, and it was not for pure devotional service.

In September 2022, PDP chief Mehbooba Mufti claimed that BJP was pushing its Hindutva agenda by forcing Muslim children in Kashmir to sing bhajans in schools, after the Government of India had issued a directive for students to recite an "all faith prayer -- Raghupati Raghav Raja Ram.. Ishwar Allah tero naam." as a part of a series of activities taking place to mark the 153rd birth anniversary of Mahatma Gandhi. While National Conference chief Farooq Abdullah rejected Mufti's claims, Muttahida Majlis-e-Ulema, a conglomerate of religious and social organisations in Kashmir, urged the government and education department to stop practices like 'singing of bhajans and Surya Namaskars' in schools, as they "hurt the religious sentiments of Muslims" and "undermine the Muslim identity of Kashmir". Former Permanent Representative of Pakistan to the United Nations, Maleeha Lodhi, too called it an "assault on Kashmiri culture and identity".

In December 2024, in an event organised in Patna, Bihar by BJP to commemorate the 100th birth anniversary of former Prime Minister, Atal Bihari Vajpayee, when folk singer Devi sang the line "Ishwar Allah tero naam" during her rendition of Raghupati Raghav Raja Ram, protests erupted among a section of the audience. She was asked to apologize, and former Union minister, Ashwini Kumar Choubey, then took the microphone from her and shouted ‘Jai Shri Ram’ to try to pacify the crowd. Former MP Shahnawaz Hussain, who was also present in the event, called the disruption “the height of intolerance”.

In December 2011, three elementary schools in Greendale, Wisconsin, had planned to include the song in their seasonal concerts. After many parents complained, the school district ultimately removed the song due to its religious nature, as it made reference to Sita, Rama, God, and Allah.

== In popular culture ==
- Elements of the chant were included in the song "Utho Utho he Bharat" in the movie Bharat Milap (1942), in songs of Shri Ram Bhakta Hanuman (1948), the song "De Dii Hamen Aazaadii" in the movie Jagriti (1954), Purab Aur Paschim (1970) and in the film Kuch Kuch Hota Hai (1998), in the Kannada film Gandhinagara (1968), in the British-Indian movie Gandhi (1982), in the film Gandhi, My Father (2007), in Satyagraha (2013), and also in Krrish 3 (2013).
- The song is an important motif in the 2006 Bollywood film, Lage Raho Munna Bhai, and is featured in the movie.
- Pete Seeger included "Raghupati Raghava Raja Ram" on his album "Strangers and Cousins" (1964) and performed it in Episode 10 of his television series Rainbow Quest.
- The game Grand Theft Auto: Liberty City Stories featured Ananda Shankar's version on one of the in-game radio stations, "Radio del Mundo".

== See also ==
- Vaishnava Jana To
- Hari Tuma Haro
- Hanuman Chalisa
- Shri Ramachandra Kripalu
- Thumak Chalat Ram Chandra

== Bibliography ==
- Dalton, Dennis (1993). Mahatma Gandhi: Nonviolent Power in Action. Columbia University Press. ISBN 0-231-12237-3.
