= Hari Tuma Haro =

Song by Several artists like Jagjit Singh M. S. Subbulakshmi
- Language: Hindi
- Published: 15th century
- Genre: Bhajan, Devotional
- Songwriter: Mirabai

Hari Tuma Haro is an Indian bhajan or devotional song by Mirabai, the 15th-century poet saint. It was Mahatma Gandhi's favorite song, who requested M S Subbulakshmi's rendition for what was to be his last birthday celebrations.

== Themes ==
"Hari Tuma Haro Janki Peer", "Oh Lord, take away the pain from mankind" is prayer to God, for alleviating the suffering of the downtrodden and those suffering.

== Lyrics ==
Hindi:

हरि तुम हरो जन की पीर ॥

द्रौपदी की लाज राखी, तुम बढ़ायो चिर ॥

भक्त कारण रूप नरहरि, धर्यो आप शरीर ॥

हरिणकश्यप मार लीन्हो, धर्यो नहिन धीर ॥

बूढ़ते गजराज राख्यो, कियो बाहर नीर ॥

दास मीरा लाल गिरधर, दु:ख जहाँ तहाँ पीर ॥

Transliteration (ISO15919):

hari tuma harō jana kī pīra ..

draupadī kī lāja rākhī, tuma baṛhāyō cira ..

bhakta kāraṇa rūpa narahari, dharyō āpa śarīra ..

hariṇakaśyapa māra līnhō, dharyō nahina dhīra ..

būṛhatē gajarāja rākhyō, kiyō bāhara nīra ..

dāsa mīrā lāla giradhara, du:kha jahām̐ tahām̐ pīra ..

English Translation:

Hari, remove the sufferings of Your people..

You protected the honor of Draupadi, Lengthening the garment that covered her..

For the sake of Your devotee, You assumed the form of Narasimhadeva..

You killed Hiranyakasipu With Your fierce form..

You rescued the drowning elephant Gajaraja, Taking him out of the water..

Oh Master Giridhara! I am only Your maidservant, Mira, Here and there, there is only suffering and pain..

== History ==
M. S. Subbulakshmi had previously visited Gandhi in Delhi, and sung Ram Dhun. Gandhi expressed the wish to hear Subbulakshmi sing the song. Subbulakshmi answered that she wasn't familiar with the song, and suggested that a noted singer should sing the bhajan. In turn, Gandhi replied that "he would rather hear her speak the words than hear someone else sing it". Feeling obliged, Subbulakshmi worked with her friends who knew the tune and lyrics, and when she got them right. The song was recorded at All India Radio (AIR) studios in Chennai, the night of October the 1st, finishing at 2 A.M. of October the 2nd. The following morning the recording was airlifted to Delhi, where it was played to Gandhi in the evening of his 78th birthday, October 2, 1947.

A few months later, on 30 January 1948, when AIR announced Gandhi's assassination, it was followed by playing of Subbulakshmi's recording of Hari Tuma Haro repeatedly.

== In popular culture ==
This song is sung by many renowned Indian singers such as M. S. Subbulakshmi and Jagjit Singh.

== See also ==
- Vaishnava Jana To
- Shri Ramachandra Kripalu
- Raghupati Raghava Raja Ram
- Thumak Chalat Ram Chandra
