= Shri Ramachandra Kripalu =

Devotional hymn to Lord Rama composed by Goswami Tulsidas

"Shri Ramachandra Kripalu Bhajman"

Hymn
- Language: Awadhi and Sanskrit
- Released: 16th century
- Genre: Bhajan, Stotra
- Songwriter: Tulsidas

Shri Ramachandra Kripalu Bhajman (Hindi: श्रीरामचन्द्र कृपालु भज मन, romanized: śrīrāmacandra kr̥pālu bhaja mana, lit. 'O mind, worship Lord Sri Ram Chandra, who is full of compassion') is a devotional hymn (stotra) composed by the 16th-century Indian poet-saint Tulsidas. It praises Lord Rama as the embodiment of compassion and beauty. The hymn is one of the most popular devotional compositions in Hindu tradition and is often recited in temples, homes, and religious gatherings.

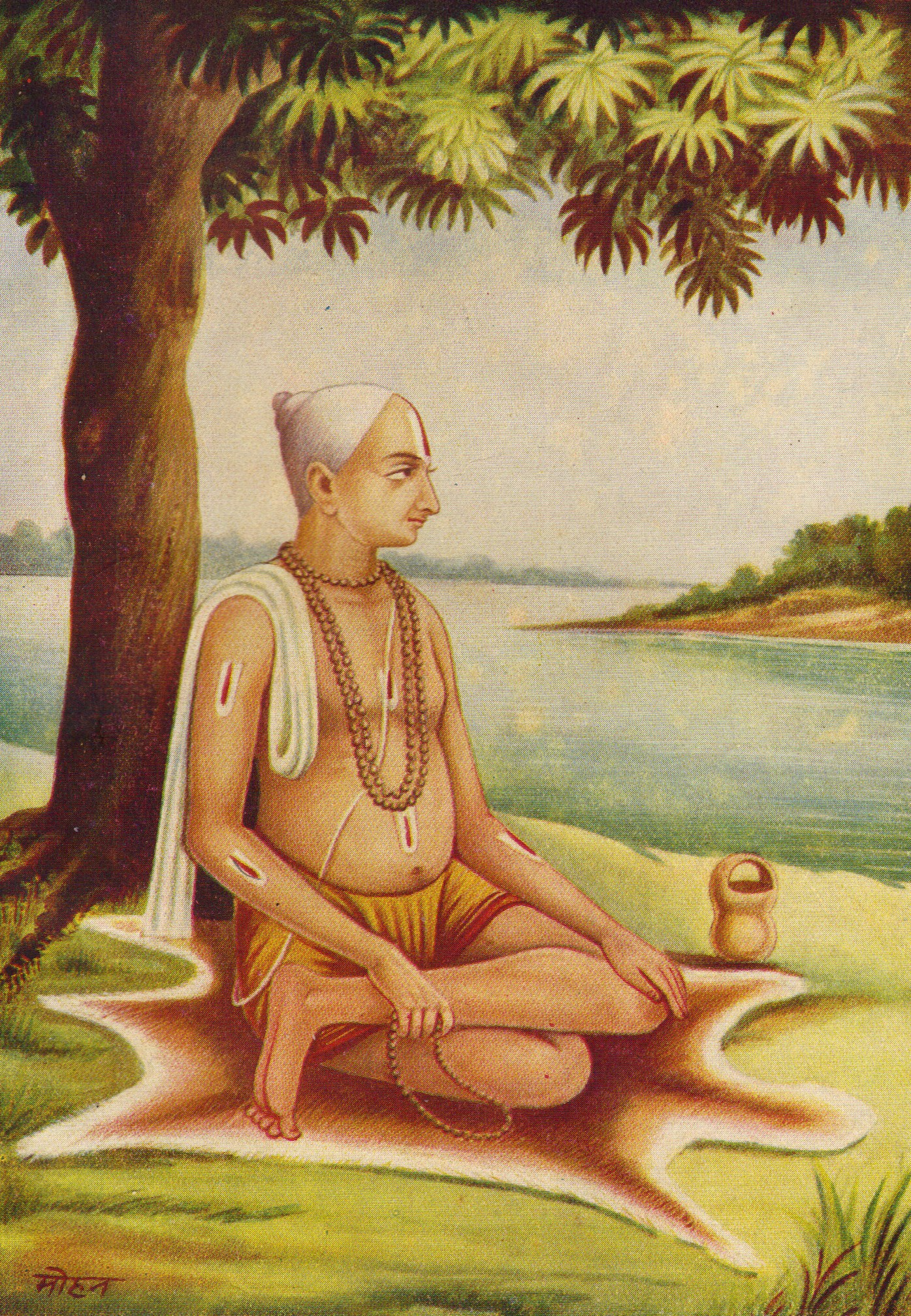
Goswami Tulsidas, who wrote the Ram stuti

== History and origin ==
The hymn is attributed to Tulsidas and is often associated with his devotional collection Vinaya Patrika. Scholars date its composition to the 16th century. It is written in a mixture of Sanskrit and Awadhi.

== Meaning and theme ==
The opening verse calls upon the devotee’s mind (bhaj man – "O mind, worship") to meditate on Lord Rama, the compassionate one (kripalu) who removes the fear of worldly existence. The verses poetically describe Rama’s divine beauty — his lotus-like eyes, hands, and feet — and his gentle, merciful nature. The hymn represents the essence of bhakti (devotion), urging the devotee to surrender the heart to Rama’s grace.

== Cultural and religious significance ==
Shri Ramachandra Kripalu Bhajman is widely sung in aarti and bhajan ceremonies dedicated to Lord Rama. It is often performed during Rama Navami celebrations and daily worship in many North Indian temples. The hymn has been recorded by famous singers such as Lata Mangeshkar, Anuradha Paudwal, and Hari Om Sharan.

== Lyrics ==
=== Opening verse ===
Devanagari:

श्रीरामचन्द्र कृपालु भज मन हरण भव भय दारुणम् ।
नवकञ्ज लोचन कञ्ज मुख कर कञ्ज पद कंजारुणम् ॥

Transliteration:

śrīrāmacandra kr̥pālu bhaja mana haraṇa bhava bhaya dāruṇam .
navakañja locana kañja mukha kara kañja pada kaṁjāruṇam

Meaning: "O mind, worship Lord Ramachandra, the compassionate one, who removes the terrible fear of worldly existence; whose eyes are like new lotuses, whose face and hands are like lotuses, and whose feet are like crimson lotuses."

=== remaining verses ===
कन्दर्प अगणित अमित छवि नव नील नीरद सुन्दरम् ।
पट पीत मानहु तडित रूचि शुचि नौमि जनक सुता वरम् ॥

भज दीन बन्धु दिनेश दानव दैत्य वंश निकन्दनम् ।
रघु नन्द आनन्द कन्द कौसल चन्द दशरथ नन्दनम् ॥

शिर मुकुट कुण्डल तिलक चारु उदार अङ्ग विभूषणम् ।
आजानु भुज शर चाप धर सङ्ग्राम जित खर दूषणम् ॥

इति वदति तुलसीदास शङ्कर शेष मुनि मन रञ्जनम् ।
मम हृदय कञ्ज निवास कुरु कामादि खलदल-गञ्जनम्॥

Transliteration

kandarpa agaṇita amita chavi nava nīla nīrada sundaram .
paṭa pīta mānahu taṛita rūci śuci naumi janaka sutā varam ..

bhaja dīna bandhu dineśa dānava daitya vaṁśa nikandanam .
raghu nanda ānanda kanda kosala-canda daśaratha nandanam ..

śira mukuṭa kuṇḍala tilaka cāru udāra aṅga vibhūṣaṇam .
ājānu bhuja śara cāpa dhara saṅgrāma jita khara dūṣaṇam ..

iti vadati tulasīdāsa śaṅkara śeṣa-muni mana rañjanam .
mama hr̥daya kaṁja nivāsa kuru kāmādi khaladala-gañjanaṁ..

== In popular culture ==
The hymn continues to be performed in devotional gatherings, religious television series, and recorded music albums. It holds a central place in Rama bhakti traditions and is among the most memorized hymns of Tulsidas.

== See also ==
- Hanuman Chalisa
- Thumak Chalat Ram Chandra
- Ramcharitmanas
- Tulsidas
- Vaishnava Jana To
- Hari Tuma Haro
