= Vinaya Patrika =

Hindu hymn

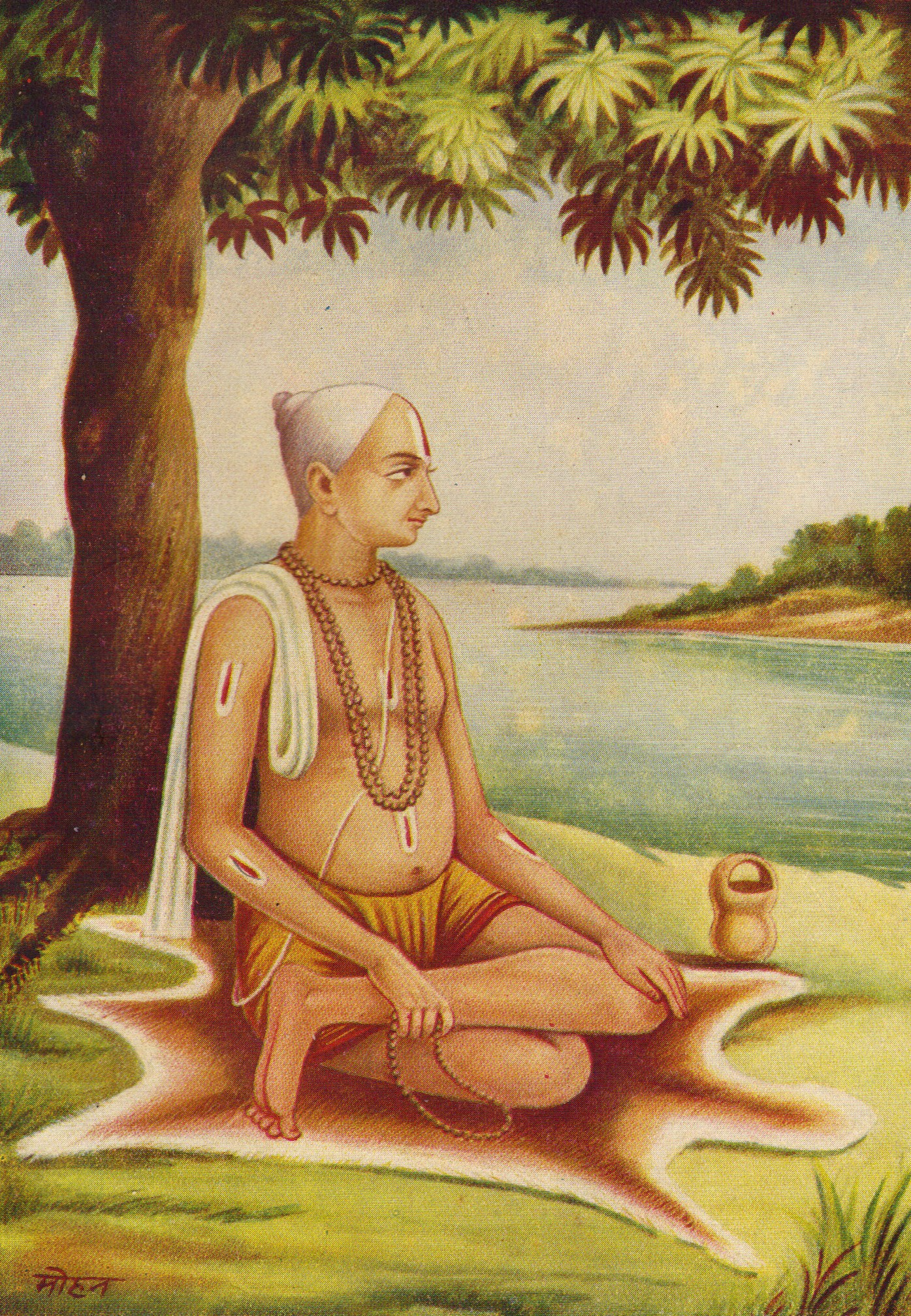
Picture of Tulsidas published in the Ramcharitmanas, 1949.

Vinaya Patrika (Letter of petition) is a devotional poem composed by the 16th-century Indian poet, Goswami Tulsidas (c. 1532 – c. 1623), containing hymns to different Hindu deities, especially to Rama.

The language of the text is Braj Bhasha.

Vinaya Patrika is an important work of medieval Hindi Literature and Bhakti movement.

== History ==
According to Swami Yatiswarananda, when Kala—the embodiment of evil—threatened to devour Tulsidas, he prayed to Hanuman who appeared to him in a dream. Hanuman advised him to file a petition to Rama to remedy the evil, and that was the origin of the Vinaya-Patrika.”

== Structure ==
Vinaya Patrika has been written as a petition against the six passions (Lust, Wrath, Greed, Inebriation, Attachments, Ego) and nine vices (Violence, Falsehood, Pride, Envy, Strife, Suspicion, Jealousy, Rivalry and Covetousness) of Kali Yuga, the plaintiff is Tulsidas himself, though he represents all of humanity. The judges addressed are Rama, Sita, Lakshmana, Bharata, and Shatrughna.

It also comprises popular devotional hymns (stutis) to various Hindu deities, like Ganesha, Surya, Devi, Ganga, Hanuman, Sita, Rama, and also the city of Kashi. The book has now been translated into many languages, including English.

== Popular hymns from Vinaya Patrika ==
- Shri Ramchandra Kripalu (Rama)
- Gaiye Ganpati Jagbandan (Ganesha)
- Jai Jai Jagjanani Devi (Kali)
- Jai Jai Bhagrathnandini (Ganga)

== See also ==
- Hindi literature

== Sources ==
- Lochtefeld, James G. (2002). The illustrated encyclopedia of Hinduism (1st ed.). New York: Rosen. ISBN 9780823922871.
