= Vaishnava Jana To =

Hindu bhajan

- by Narsinh Mehta
- Original title: વૈષ્ણવ જન તો
- Written: 15th century
- First published in: Prāchīn Kāvya (1885)
- Country: Gujarat, India
- Language: Gujarati
- Subject: The qualities of a Vaishnava
- Genre: Bhajan
- Form: pad
- Lines: 20 (five verses of four lines)
- વૈષ્ણવજન તો તેને રે કહીયે at Gujarati Wikisource

"Vaishnava Jana To" (Gujarati: વૈષ્ણવ જન તો; IAST: Vaiṣṇava jana to) is a Gujarati devotional poem, or Hindu pad, by the 15th-century poet-saint Narsinh Mehta of Junagadh, Gujarat. The poem defines a Vaishnava, or devotee of Vishnu, through their ideal conduct and virtues such as empathy for others' suffering, honesty, integrity, restraint, humility, freedom from greed and lust, detachment from material possessions, and unwavering devotion to God. The qualities the poem lists are entirely ethical and spiritual, not based in caste, community, or gender.

Mahatma Gandhi adopted the poem as a central element of his spiritual practice. It was sung daily at his ashrams, and its opening stanza appears on the title page of the Ashram Bhajanavali. Gandhi stated that the poem alone would sustain him even if he forgot the Bhagavad Gita. He used it publicly to argue against untouchability. Christian and Muslim associates requested to substitute their faith's name for "Vaishnava", which Gandhi interpreted as evidence of the poem's universal relevance.

A semi-classical musical arrangement composed at Sabarmati in the 1920s introduced the poem to audiences beyond Gujarat and established the melody by which it is now widely recognised. The poem was subsequently used in radio broadcasting, Carnatic concert repertoire, film, television, and qawwali and hip-hop adaptations. It concludes Richard Attenborough's film Gandhi and has been performed at memorials, peace marches, and civic events both in India and internationally.

== Background ==
Statue of Narsinh Mehta in Vadodara

The poem's author, Narsinh Mehta (c. 1414–1480), was from the Nagar Brahmin community of Junagadh, Gujarat. He lost his parents as a child, and was taken in and raised by his cousin. While the Nagar Brahmin community were predominantly worshippers of Shiva, Narsinh was devoted to the worship of Krishna from his childhood. Much of his childhood was spent engaged in singing devotional songs with sadhus camped on the outskirts of town. Even after marriage and the birth of two children, his refusal to pursue a steady occupation for the chance to remain engrossed in devotion to Krishna, kept his family destitute and dependent on his cousin for survival.

Charlotte Vaudeville placed Mehta's songs and life narratives in the middle of a changing trend of the worship of both Shiva and Vishnu to exclusive focus on Krishna. Mehta's poetry developed without institutional backing, as the Krishna-worshipping orders later established in Gujarat, including Vallabhacharya's Pushtimarg, never considered Mehta as a poet central to their tradition.

Mehta's poems fall into two groups: retellings of Krishna's boyhood in Vraj and jñāna-bhakti pieces about divinity, selfhood, and devotion. The form of the poem is the pad, which is a compact, emotionally direct lyric that turns on a refrain that a group sings back. The language of the poem, Gujarati, was what people of the region actually spoke rather than the Sanskrit associated more closely with scriptural and scholarly works. From the late 19th century, Gujarati scholars called Mehta ādikavi as his songs were the earliest to circulate widely among Gujarati speakers.

== Authorship and textual history ==
The poem's fame has led to close study of its authorship, particularly focusing on the fact that it is missing from the earliest 17th-century manuscript collections of Mehta's lyrics. The oldest known manuscript containing this poem is at the B. J. Institute in Ahmedabad, dated 1835 (Vikram Samvat 1892). However, K. K. Shastri reported examining an early 18th-century manuscript containing the lyric. A 19th-century claim that Dalpatram (1820–1898), the earliest modern Gujarati poet, was the real author of the poem was dismissed after comparing the dates of the earliest extant manuscript and the start of Dalpatram's literary career.

Shukla-Bhatt writes that this poem belongs to an existing tradition in premodern Gujarati poetry of defining a Vaishnava in ethical terms. Considering that background, some scholars name Mehta its author and the 15th century as its date of origin without qualification, while others note that the earliest extant manuscript is dated to the 18th century.

Deepak Mehta dates the first print appearance of Mehta's poems to 1852. The poem was also printed in 1885 in Hargovinddas Kantawala's Prāchīn Kāvya and again in 1913 in Iccharam Suryaram Desai's Kāvyasaṅgraha, an anthology of over a thousand lyrics from across Gujarat.

== Text ==
Gujarati
Devanagari
IAST Transliteration
Translation (Note: Shukla-Bhatt prints the translation as a continuous poem in which the third and fourth verses form a single strophe. The lineation has been adjusted here so that each English passage sits beside the Gujarati verse it renders; no wording has been altered.)

વૈષ્ણવ જન તો તેને કહિયે,
જે પીડ પરાઈ જાણે રે;
પર દુ:ખે ઉપકાર કરે તો યે,
મન અભિમાન ન આણે રે. ॥ધૃ॥

वैष्णव जन तो तेने कहिये
जे पीड परायी जाणे रे ।
पर दुःखे उपकार करे तो ये
मन अभिमान न आणे रे ॥

vaiṣṇava jana to tene kahiye
je pīḍa parāī jāṇe re,
para duḥkhe upakāra kare to ye
mana abhimāna na āṇe re

Call only that one a true Vaishnava,
who understands others' pain,
who helps them in their suffering,
but has no arrogance in his heart.

સકળ લોકમાં સહુને વંદે,
નિંદા ન કરે કેની રે;
વાચ કાછ મન નિશ્ચલ રાખે,
ધન ધન જનની તેની રે. ॥૧॥

सकळ लोकमां सहुने वंदे,
निंदा न करे केनी रे ।
वाच काछ मन निश्चल राखे,
धन धन जननी तेनी रे ॥

sakaḷa loka māṁ sahune vande,
nindā na kare kenī re,
vāca kācha mana niścala rākhe,
dhana dhana jananī tenī re

The one who respects everyone in the world,
and speaks ill of none,
who is unwavering in speech, action, and thought,
blessed, blessed is his mother!

સમદૃષ્ટિ ને તૃષ્ણા ત્યાગી,
પરસ્ત્રી જેને માત રે;
જિહ્વા થકી અસત્ય ન બોલે,
પરધન નવ ઝાલે હાથ રે. ॥૨॥

समदृष्टि ने तृष्णा त्यागी,
परस्त्री जेने मात रे ।
जिह्वा थकी असत्य न बोले,
परधन नव झाले हाथ रे ॥

sama-dṛṣṭi ne tṛṣṇā tyāgī,
para-strī jene māta re,
jihvā thakī asatya na bole,
para-dhana nava jhāle hātha re

The one who sees everyone as equal, and has given up desires,
who views another's wife as mother,
whose tongue does not lie,
who does not touch another's wealth,

મોહ માયા વ્યાપે નહિ જેને,
દૃઢ વૈરાગ્ય જેના મનમાં રે;
રામ નામ શુ તાળી રે લાગી,
સકળ તીરથ તેના તનમાં રે. ॥૩॥

मोह माया व्यापे नहि जेने,
दृढ़ वैराग्य जेना मनमां रे ।
रामनाम शु ताळी रे लागी,
सकळ तीरथ तेना तनमां रे ॥

moha māyā vyāpe nahi jene,
dṛḍha-vairāgya jenā manamāṁ re,
rāma-nāma śu tāḷī lāgī,
sakaḷa tīratha tenā tanamāṁ re

who is not bound by illusory attachments,
whose detachment is firm,
and whose heart is immersed in Ram's name,
all places of pilgrimage are within his body.

વણ લોભી ને કપટ રહિત છે,
કામ ક્રોધ નિવાર્યાં રે;
ભણે નરસૈયો તેનું દર્શન કરતાં,
કુળ એકોતેર તાર્યાં રે. ॥૪॥

वणलोभी ने कपटरहित छे,
काम क्रोध निवार्या रे ।
भणे नरसैयो तेनुं दरसन करतां,
कुळ एकोतेर तार्या रे ॥

vaṇa-lobhī ne kapaṭa-rahita che,
kāma krodha nivāryā re,
bhaṇe narasaiyo tenuṁ darasana karatāṁ,
kuḷa ekotera tāryā re

The one who is without greed or deceit,
who has subdued anger and lust,
on seeing that one, says Narasaĩyo:
seventy-one generations are saved.

== Themes ==
The poem defines proper Vaishnava conduct, asserting that religious standing is based on virtues such as compassion and moral integrity. Sitanshu Yashaschandra argues that the indeclinable to in the first line confines the definition of what a Vaishnava is and excludes all that falls outside it.

Empathy is prioritised among the virtues, specifically the ability to understand another person's pain (pīḍ parāī). Shukla-Bhatt emphasises that the poem does not present this as mere sentiment, since the verse links empathy to an obligation to act without pride in alleviating another's suffering. Gandhi considered ahimsa to be the foremost Vaishnava attribute according to the poem. According to the scholar Steven Rosen, the poem expresses the principle of jīva-dayā, a form of ahimsa that is focused not just on non-harm, but on actively doing good to others.

Subsequent verses advocate for equal regard for all (sama-dṛṣṭi), renunciation of craving, truthfulness, and respect for others' property. As conduct is the sole criterion, the poem aligns with the scepticism about caste found elsewhere in Mehta's work. Charlotte Vaudeville interpreted it as expressing a "lay ideal of sanctity" rather than adherence to a specific doctrine.

== Musical arrangement and recordings ==
=== Traditional form ===
Mehta's songs are all deśī compositions, the Gujarati term for a medieval lyric intended from the outset for singing, often using inherited metres and already popular tunes. The ragas attached to them in the manuscript record, from the earliest copies onwards, are predominantly those of the morning, such as Ramagri, Prabhati, Bilaval and Asavari. Songs of contemplation meant for the morning are sung as prabhātiyā̃, to gentle ragas conventionally linked with tenderness and affection.

These hymns are performed on specific occasions. During prabhāt-pherī, singers move through the streets of a village or town around six in the morning, and radio stations begin daily broadcasts with recordings of prabhātiyā̃. Niranjan Rajyaguru has described all-night singing sessions, noting that Mehta's songs are typically sung from the early morning hours after 3:30 a.m. until daybreak.

=== Popular arrangement and recordings ===
The melody by which the poem is now generally recognised is not its traditional Gujarati morning tune. Narayan Khare, who served as musician at Gandhi's Ahmedabad Sabarmati ashram, set it in the 1920s to a semi-classical tune in Mishra Khamaj, an evening raga and, as Shukla-Bhatt writes, an exception to the morning settings the rest of Mehta's corpus keeps. The new arrangement was meant to extend the song's reach to listeners outside Gujarat.

Mumbai radio stations in the 1940s would play the song, often in the voice of Khare's daughter Mathuriben Khare. Vijay Bhatt's Hindi film Narsi Bhagat (1940), undertaken at Gandhi's suggestion and built closely around Gandhi's reading of the saint, closes with the song. Rachel Dwyer writes that this ending restates the film's own subject, which is what being a Vaishnava consists of. The Carnatic vocalist M. S. Subbulakshmi (1916–2004) took the song into her repertoire, often placing it near the close of her concerts.

Recordings reached a mass market on cassette and afterwards on compact disc, the best known being Narasinha Mehta, Uttam Pado, sung by Asit Desai with Hema Desai and their group. Later arrangements moved further from the devotional setting. The Texas-based Sufi band, Riyaaz Qawwali, perform the poem as a qawwali, adding rhythmic variation, clapping, and interpolating couplets of Kabir. Rapper Brodha V used its refrain in a 2019 single of the same name, contrasting Gandhian bhajan pacifism with lyrics about present-day division.

== Gandhi ==
=== Ashram and public life ===
The poem was sung daily at Gandhi's ashrams and on important public and private occasions. The poem's opening stanza serves as an epigraph on the title page of the Ashram Bhajanavali, a series of hymns curated by Gandhi for daily services at the Sabarmati Ashram. His secretary Mahadev Desai described it "almost as life-breath of Gandhiji", and Gandhi had publicly stated that even if he forgot the Bhagavad Gita, this hymn alone would be enough to keep him going. It was sung during the Salt March in 1930, during his fasts, at his son Devdas's wedding in 1933, and at Kasturba Gandhi's cremation in 1944.

Joseph Royeppen, a devout Christian active in the Satyagraha movement, often visited the Phoenix Settlement and liked the song. On one occasion, he asked singers to replace "Vaishnava" with "Christian". A Muslim imam often made a similar request to replace "Vaishnava" with "Muslim". Gandhi saw such substitutions as evidence that the poem's terms held universal appeal.

=== Translations ===
Gandhi made an English version of the poem with commentary in November 1920 while on the overnight train between Benares and Allahabad. The manuscript was missing when his secretary's diaries were prepared for publication, so the printed volume includes a substitute verse translation by the translator. A prose version by Gandhi survives in the English Ashram Bhajanavali, which he translated between 1928 and 1930.

=== Dalit acceptance in Hindu society ===
Gandhi treated caste as a harmful custom separate from the essence of the Hindu religion and its principles of varna and ashrama. So, when Gandhi met resistance against his campaign to promote Dalit acceptance in Hindu society, he used the poem to respond with a series of articles in his Navajivan weekly. Gandhi cited the poem to argue that a Vaishnava is defined by non-violence and practical sympathy, not by caste. A religion that produced a devotee like Mehta, who had defined a Vaishnava as one who saw all as equal, could not hold some members to be untouchable. In his ashrams, where the poem was sung daily, Dalit families lived equally with everyone else.

== Broader use ==
Gandhi regarded the poem as equivalent in importance to scripture, and through his influence it reached audiences far beyond Gujarat, becoming closely associated with his philosophy of pacifism. The poem has since been used in contexts that are neither specifically Gujarati nor strictly religious. It is featured under the closing titles of Richard Attenborough's film Gandhi. It was performed at a benefit concert for Indian earthquake victims in 2001, at the 2007 installation of Drew Gilpin Faust as Harvard University's first woman president, and at a major cultural programme organised by Singapore's Indian community that same year. Activists from India and Pakistan included the poem in their international Dandi March, travelling to Gaza via Iran, Syria, and Egypt between December 2010 and January 2011.

Father Vinayak Jadav, S.J., produced a two-part Gujarati exegesis for the Gurjarvani centre at St Xavier's College in Ahmedabad, employing the poem to illustrate Christian ideals. Shukla-Bhatt identified more than two hundred versions posted to YouTube—performed through singing, instrumental music, dance, and acting—and interpreted this diversity as evidence of the poem's ability to transcend divisions of caste, class, gender, faith, region, and nationality.

== See also ==
- Raghupati Raghava Raja Ram
- Hari Tuma Haro
