= Hanuman Chalisa =

Hindu devotional hymn

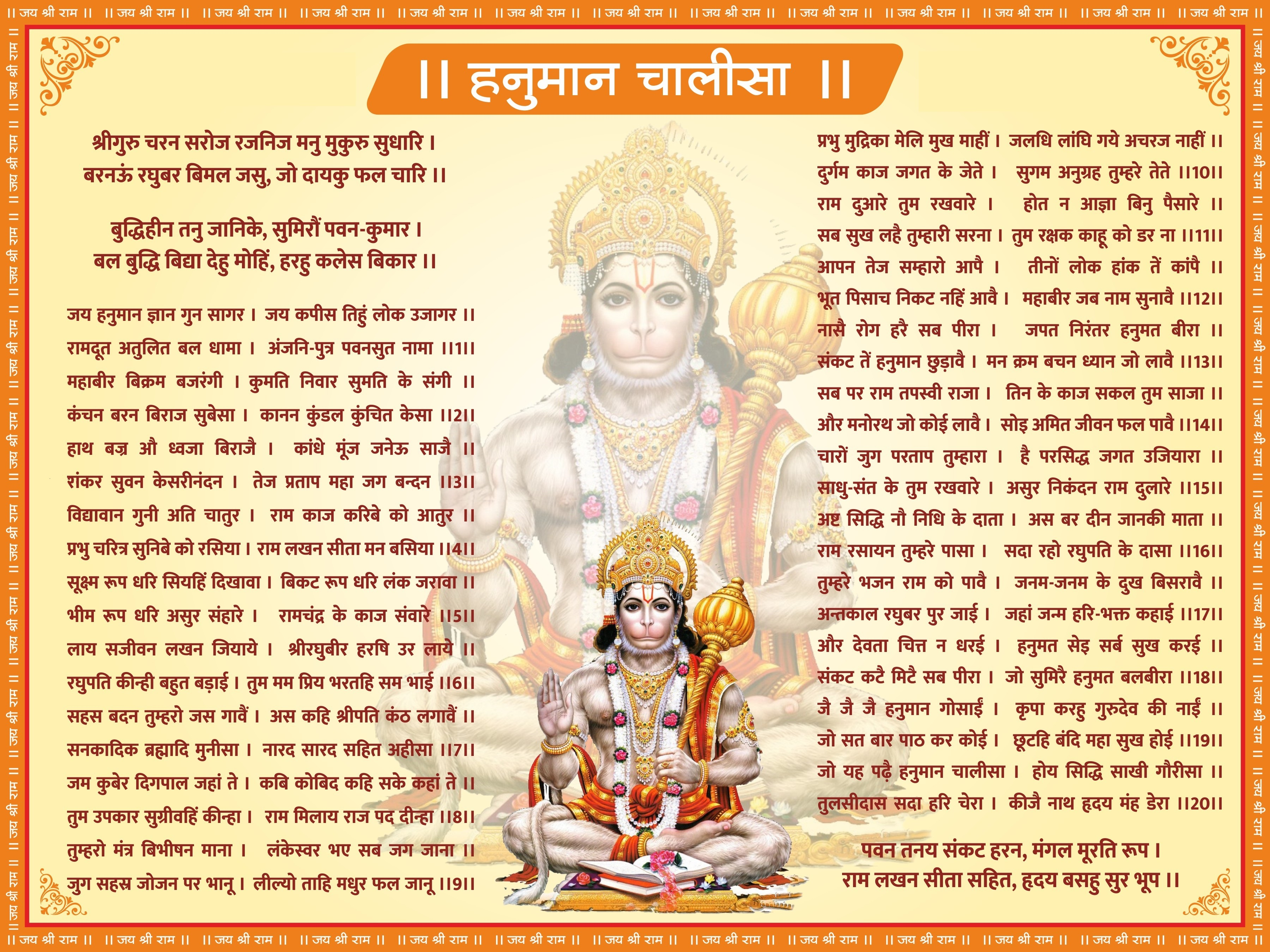
- Hanuman Chalisa Full Text (Book)

Information
- Religion: Hinduism
- Author: Tulsidas
- Language: Awadhi
- Verses: 40

The Hanuman Chalisa (Hindi: हनुमान चालीसा; Hindi pronunciation: [ɦənʊmaːn tʃaːliːsaː]; Forty chaupais on Hanuman) is a Hindu devotional hymn (stotra) in praise of Hanuman, and regularly recited by Hindus. It was written by Tulsidas in the Awadhi language and is the best known text from the Ramcharitmanas.

Hanuman is a Hindu deity and a devotee of the Hindu god, Rama. He is one of the central characters of the Ramayana. According to the Shaiva tradition, he is also an incarnation of Shiva. The Hanuman Chalisa praises the power and other qualities of Hanuman including his strength, courage, wisdom, celibacy (brahmacharya), and devotion to Rama.

== Etymology ==
The word chālīsā is derived from chālīs, meaning the number 'forty' in Hindi, denoting the number of chaupais (quatrains) in the Hanuman Chalisa (excluding the couplets at the beginning and the end).

== Authorship ==
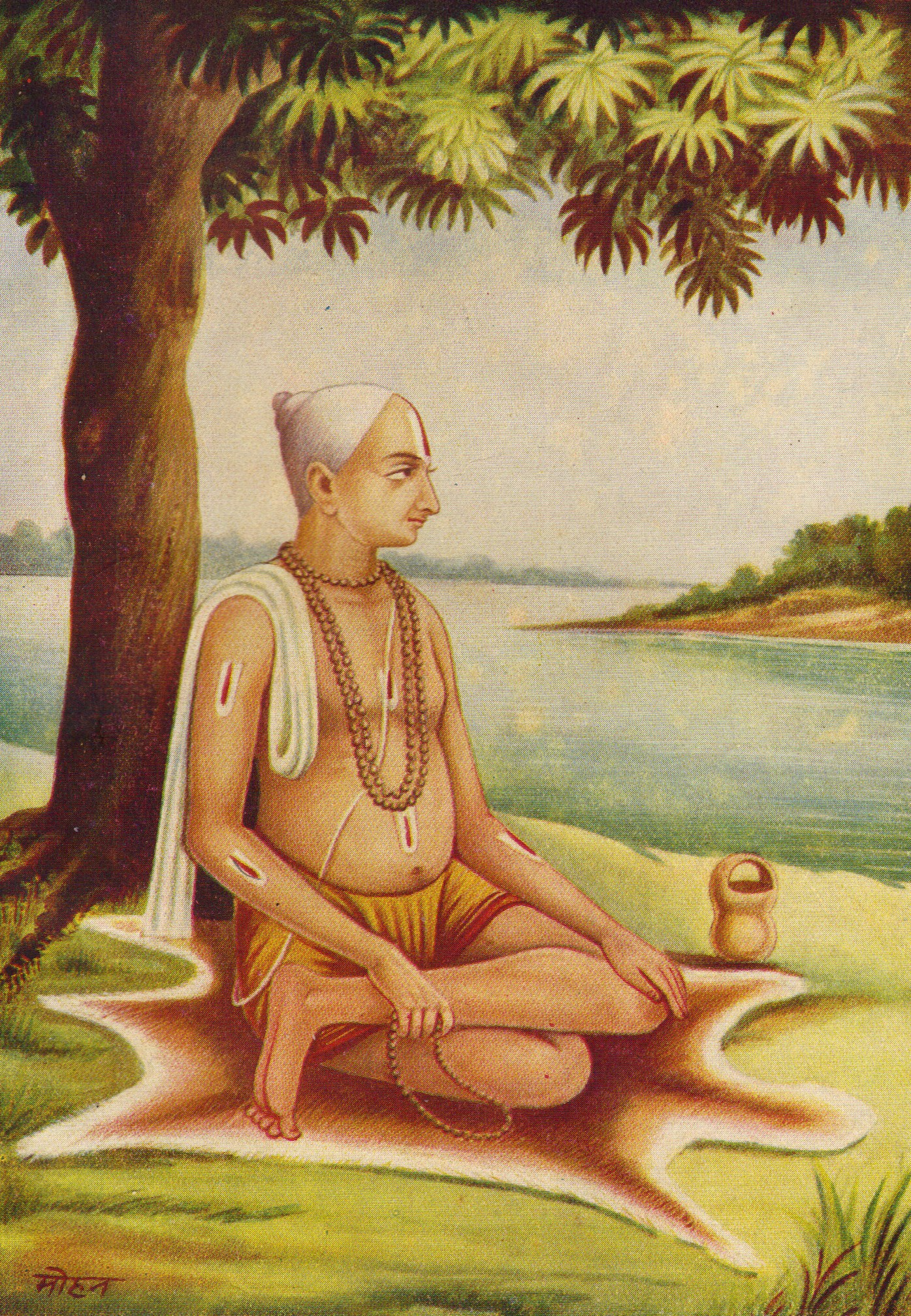
Picture of Tulsidas

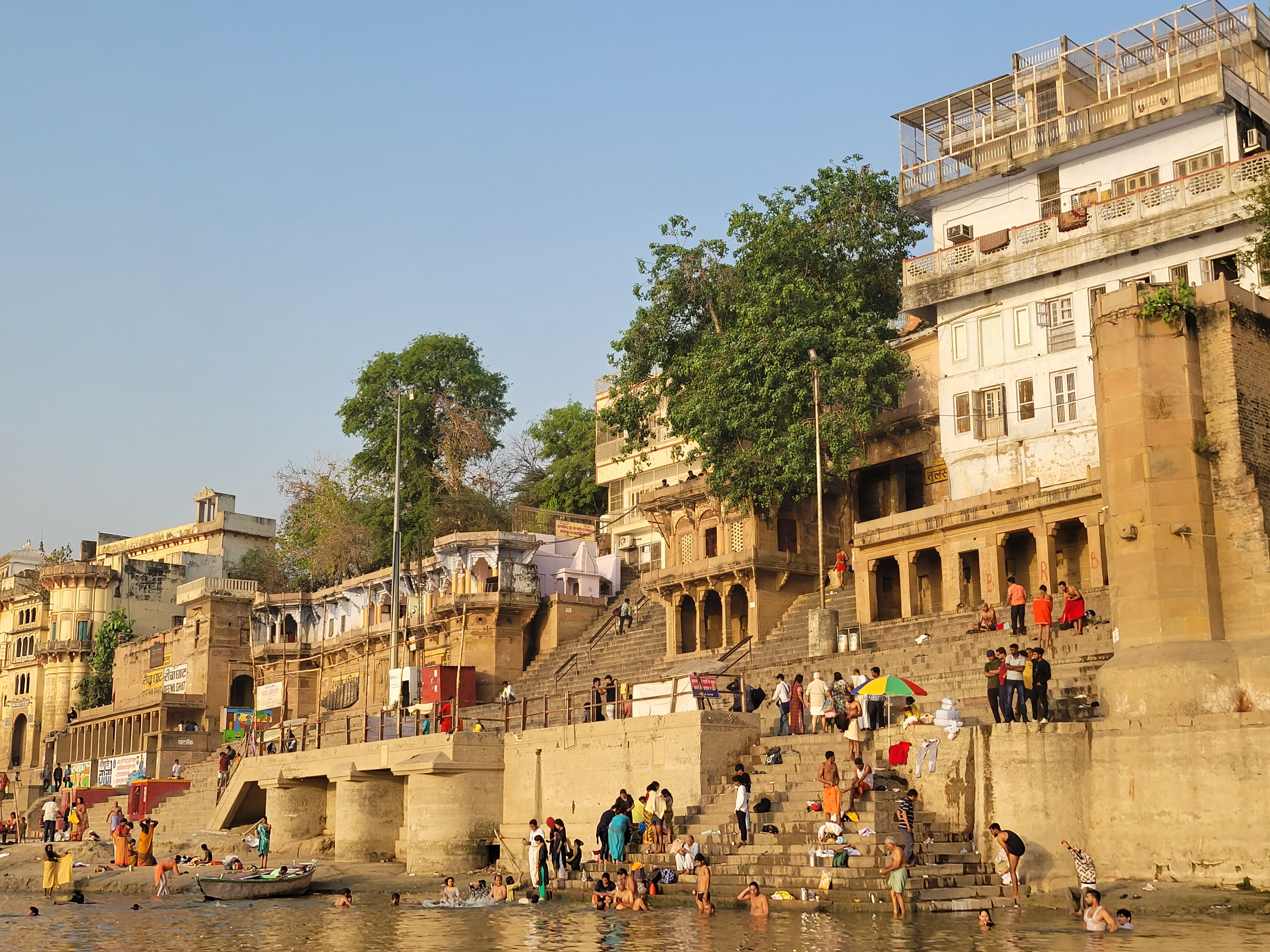
Home of Tulsidas on the banks of River Ganga Tulsi Ghat Varanasi where Hanuman Chalisa was written. A small temple is also located at this site.

The Hanuman Chalisa was authored by Tulsidas, a poet-saint who lived in the 16th century CE. Tulsidas, a Hindu saint-poet, reformer, and philosopher, was known for his devotion to Rama. A composer of several popular works, he is best known for being the author of the epic Ramcharitmanas, a retelling of the Ramayana in the vernacular Awadhi language. Tulsidas was acclaimed in his lifetime to be a reincarnation of Valmiki, the composer of the original Ramayana in Sanskrit. Tulsidas lived in the city of Varanasi until his death. The Tulsi Ghat in Varnasi is named after him. He founded the Sankat Mochan Hanuman Temple dedicated to Hanuman in Varanasi, believed to stand at the place where he had the sight of Hanuman. Tulsidas started the Ramlila plays, a folk-theatre adaption of the Ramayana. He has been acclaimed as one of the greatest poets in Hindi, Indian, and World literature. The impact of Tulsidas and his works on the art, culture and society in India is widespread and is seen to date in vernacular language, Ramlila plays, Hindustani classical music, popular music, and television series.

== Deity ==
Hanuman, the Hindu deity to whom the prayer is addressed, was an ardent devotee of Rama (the seventh avatar of Vishnu) and a central character in the Ramayana. A general among the vanaras, Hanuman was a warrior of Rama in the war against the rakshasa king Ravana. Hanuman's exploits are much celebrated in a variety of religious and cultural traditions, particularly in Hinduism, to the extent that he is often the object of worship according to some bhakti traditions, and is the prime deity in many temples known as Hanuman mandirs.

== Structure ==
The work consists of forty-three verses – two introductory dohas, forty chaupais, and one doha in the end. The first introductory doha begins with the words 'shrī guru,' referring to Shiva, who is considered the guru of Hanuman. The auspicious form, knowledge, virtues, powers and bravery of Hanuman are described in the first ten Chaupais. Chaupais eleven to twenty describe the acts of Hanuman in his service to Rama, with the eleventh to fifteenth Chaupais describing the role of Hanuman in reviving Lakshmana. In the twenty-first Chaupai, Tulsidas describes the need of Hanuman's kripa (transl. divine grace). At the end, Tulsidas greets Hanuman with subtle devotion and requests him to reside in his heart and in the heart of devotees. The concluding doha again requests Hanuman to reside in the heart, along with Rama, Lakshmana, and Sita.

== Theological significance ==
The text expounds on Hanuman as not only a devotee of Rama but significant as a deity in his own right. Furthermore, the text describes Hanuman's strength, speed, knowledge, and devotion. Devotion (bhakti) is emphasized throughout. It is described in the text that one who recites the Chalisa will be granted protection, spiritual merit, and even liberation.

== Ritual ==
The Hanuman Chalisa is recited by millions of Hindus every day, and many practising Hindus know its text by heart. Traditionally, Tuesday and Saturdays are devoted to Hanuman and the Chalisa is recited then.

== Commentaries ==
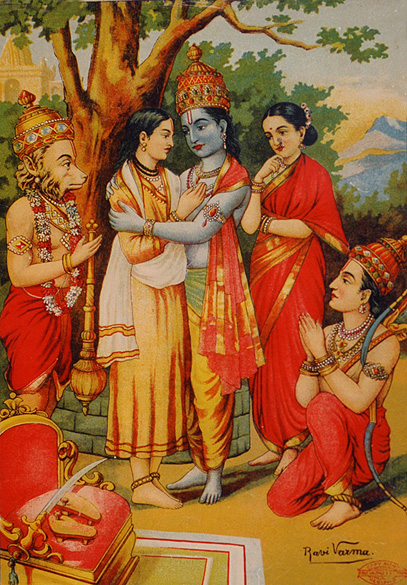
Depiction of Bharata meeting Rama watched by Hanuman, Sita and Lakshmana. From left – Hanuman, Bharata, Rama, Sita and Lakshmana.

Before the 1980s, no commentary had been composed on the Hanuman Chalisa, which Rambhadracharya attributes to the work not being included in printed editions of collected works of Tulsidas. Indubhushan Ramayani authored the first brief commentary on Hanuman Chalisa. Rambhadracharya's Mahaviri commentary in Hindi, authored in 1983, was called the best commentary on Hanuman Chalisa by Rama Chandra Prasad.

== In popular culture ==
=== Classical and folk music ===
The Hanuman Chalisa is one of the best selling Hindu religious books and has been sung by many popular bhajan, classical and folk singers. The rendition of Hanuman Chalisa by Hari Om Sharan, originally released in 1974 by the Gramophone Company of India and re-released in 1995 by Super Cassettes Industries, is one of the most popular, and is regularly played at temples and homes across Northern India. This rendition is based on traditional melodies in the Mishra Khamaj, a raga belonging to the Khamaj That, with the base note taken at the second black key (kali do) of the harmonium. A recording based on the same traditional melodies was released in 1992 by Super Cassettes Industries, with Hariharan as the singer and Gulshan Kumar as the artiste.

Other notable renditions include those by bhajan singers Anup Jalota and Ravindra Jain, Hindustani vocalists Pandit Jasraj and Rajan and Sajan Mishra, and the Carnatic vocalist M.S. Subbulakshmi. The renditions by Unni Krishnan, Nithyasree Mahadevan, Pandit Bhimsen Joshi, Ganapathi Sachchidananda Swamiji and Morari Bapu are also popular.

Among western singers Krishna Das has performed the Hanuman Chalisa in both slow and fast formats.

=== Popular movies ===
In the Hindi movie 1920 (directed by Vikram Bhatt), Hanuman Chalisa is frequently used in different scenes. One of the scenes show the protagonist Arjun Singh Rathod (played by Rajneesh Duggal), reciting the Hanuman Chalisa in full. It is used in an important sequence in Bajrangi Bhaijaan, when the protagonist fights back against child traffickers and rescues a little girl from them.

An animation movie named Shri Hanuman Chalisa directed by Charuvi Agarwal and designed by Charuvi Design Labs is a film on Hanuman.

=== Popular music ===
Popular singers who have sung the Hanuman Chalisa include Carnatic singer M. S. Subbulakshmi, as well as Lata Mangeshkar, Gulshan Kumar, Mahendra Kapoor, S. P. Balasubrahmanyam, Shankar Mahadevan, Anuradha Paudwal, Kailash Kher, Sukhwinder Singh, Sonu Nigam, Hariharan, Diljit Dosanjh and Udit Narayan.

The Hanuman Chalisa was sung by Amitabh Bachchan in chorus with twenty other singers. This recording was released as a part of the Shri Hanuman Chalisa album in 2011 and received an unprecedented response by the releasing music label during November 2011.

A rendition of Hanuman Chalisa sung by Hariharan became the first devotional song and first on YouTube to cross 5 billion views in November 2025.

=== Crisis times ===
On 30 September 2026, Smit Machchhar, the captain of Flydubai Flight 1073, who was attacked by his copilot during the latter's attempt to crash the flight but managed to thwart the terror plot by opening the cockpit door from the inside, allowing crew and passengers to intervene and subdue the attacker, kept reciting the Hanuman Chalisa while receiving his life-threatening injuries in the attack. The airplane with 180 occupants then safely made an emergency landing in Tabuk, Saudi Arabia, with no fatalities.

The news of Machchhar's recitation of the Hanuman Chalisa during the struggle on the airplane inspired many to create cultural works in his honour. Artist Yogendra Pal Singh Solanki created original artwork using grain rice to blend India's agrarian society inspiration with a depiction of Machchhar and Hanuman. Israeli singer, Ben Raivitz, sang a version of the Hanuman Chalisa as a tribute to Machchhar's recitation on the plane. Hanuman Ansh film star, Shobhinaw Satyaa, praised Machchhar for reciting the Hanuman Chalisa after being attacked by his copilot. He commented that Machchhar, "made us realise the power of the Hanuman Chalisa". He said Machchhar brought attention to their shared faith in a positive light.

== See also ==
- Shri Ramachandra Kripalu
- Thumak Chalat Rama Chandra
