= Hari Om Sharan =

Indian singer

- Hari Om Sharan

Background information
- Born: 26 September 1932; Lahore, Punjab, British India (present-day Punjab, Pakistan)
- Died: 17 December 2007 (aged 75) Queens, New York City, New York, United States
- Genres: Playback singing
- Occupations: Singer and lyricist
- Instrument: Harmonium
- Years active: 1973–2007
- Labels: His Master's Voice, T-Series, All India Radio

Hari Om Sharan (26 September 1932 – 18 December 2007) was an Indian Hindu devotional singer and lyricist. Most of his career was dedicated to singing devotional songs in praise of Sita, Rama, and Hanuman. As a Bhajan singer in the 1970s, he recorded albums such as Premanjali Pushpanjali and Daata Ek Ram. During his musical career spanning over 35 years, he released over 20 devotional albums.

== Biography ==
=== Early life ===
Shri Hari Om Sharan was born in Lahore, now Pakistan, on 26 September 1932. His family migrated to India after the Partition of India in 1947.

=== Recording career ===
He became a professional singer in 1973, singing his first album for His Master's Voice. During a trip to Guyana, he met Nandini, a Hindu Indo-Guyanese woman, whom he later married, and settled down within India.

Hari Om Sharan & Murli Manohar Swarup - Pushpanjali

He appeared briefly in an English film, Holy Smoke! (1999), as a singer.

=== Tribute from other artists ===
In 2004, an album of Hari Om's bhajans, sung by the front runners of India's music industry, titled Hari Om – Salutation, was released. The contributors to this album included: Pt. Jasraj, Pt. Shivkumar Sharma, Sonu Nigam, Hariharan, Anup Jalota, Shankar Mahadevan, Richa Sharma, Sadhana Sargam, Shaan, Mahalaxmi Iyer, and Sunidhi Chauhan and was created by Neil Prashad. Percussionist Sivamani provided the backdrop.

== Bhajans ==
Bhajan	Album	Year
Aisa Pyar Baha De Maiya (ऐसा प्यार बहा दे मैया)	–	
Govind Jai Jai Gopal Jai Jai (गोविन्द जय जय गोपाल जय जय)	–	
Hanuman Chalisa (हनुमान चालीसा)	Shri Hanuman Chalisa	
Maili Chadhar Odh Ke Kaise (मैली चादर ओढ़ के कैसे)	Premanjali	
Aarti Kunj Bihari Ki (आरती कुञ्ज बिहारी की)	–	
Pawan Sut Binti Baram Baar (पवन सुत विनती बारंबार)	–	
Prabhu Ham Pe Kripa Karna (प्रभु हम पे कृपा करना)	–	
Rakh Laaj Meri Ganpati (राख लाज मेरी गणपति)	–	
Shyam Kaho Sai Kaho (श्याम कहो साई कहो)	–	
Bhaj Govinda Jai Gopala (भज गोविंदा जय गोपाला)	Sumiran	1980
Durgati Haarini Durga Ambe (दुर्गति हारिणी दुर्गा अम्बे)	Sumiran	1980
Jai Bhola Bhandari Shivhar (जय भोला भण्डारी)	Sumiran	1980
Ram Rahim Ram Ram (राम रहीम राम राम)	Sumiran	1980
Tere Naam Ka Sumiran Karke (तेरे नाम का सुमिरन करके)	Sumiran	1980
Vinay Meri Sun Lijiye Vinay (मिठास भर देंगे यह निर्गुण भजन )	–	
Na Yeh Tere Na Yeh Mera (ना यह तेरा ना यह मेरा )	–	
Sweekaro Mere Parnaam (स्वीकारो मेरे परनाम)	Premanjali	
Sain Teri Yaad Maha Sukhdai (साईं तेरी याद महा सुखदाई)	Premanjali	
Prabhu Ham Pe Kripa Karna (प्रभु हम पे कृपा करना)	Premanjali	
Ram Sumir Ke Rahem (राम सुमिर के रहम)	Premanjali	
Jagdambike Jai Jai (जगदम्बिके जय जय)

== Discography ==
- Pushpanjali (1972)
- Premanjali (1977)
- Sri Krishna Charit Maanas (Musical Drama – 1979)
- Jai Jai Shri Hanuman (1979)
- Devi Geet (1979)
- Sumiran (1980)
- Aaradhan (1981)
- Prabhupada Kripa (1981)
- Daata Ek Raam
- Bhakti Vandan
- Sri Hanuman Chalisa
- Aarti Archan
- Bhajan Uphaar
- Kabir Vani
- Chalo Man Vrindavan Ki Oor
- Bhajan Deepanjali
- Kahat Kabhir Suno Bhai Sadho
- Govind Ke Gun Ga Ley (1984)
- Sai Kripa (1984)
- Gunn Gaan (1994)
- Shiv Mahima (1994)
- Ram Bhakt Hanuman (1996)
- Sampoorna Sundara Kaand (1994)
