= Thumak Chalat Ram Chandra =

Prayer composed by Tulasīdāsa

Thumak Chalat Ram Chandra is a bhajan (Hindu devotional song) written in the 16th century by the poet Goswami Tulsidas. The bhajan glorifies Shri Rama and his characteristics during the childhood. Shri Tulsidasji describes Lord Rama's eyes, ears, and ornaments. He wants to compare Lord Rama's face with worldly wonders but couldn't find anything worthy enough so decides that the only thing comparable to Rama's face is Lord Rama's face itself.

== Lyrics ==
=== Original Hindi lyrics ===
ठुमक चलत रामचंद्र बाजत पैंजनियाँ॥
किलकि किलकि उठत धाय गिरत भूमि लटपटाय।
धाय मात गोद लेत दशरथ की रनियाँ॥
अंचल रज अंग झारि विविध भांति सो दुलारि।
तन मन धन वारि वारि कहत मृदु बचनियाँ॥
विद्रुम से अरुण अधर बोलत मुख मधुर मधुर।
सुभग नासिका में चारु लटकत लटकनियाँ॥
तुलसीदास अति आनंद देखके मुखारविंद।
रघुवर छबि के समान रघुवर छबि बनियाँ॥

=== Transliteration (ISO 15919) ===
ṭhumaka calata rāmacandra bājata paijaniyām̐..
kilaki kilaki uṭhata dhāya girata bhūmi laṭapaṭāya.
dhāya māta gōda lēta daśaratha kī raniyām̐..
añcala raja aṅga jhāri vividha bhānti sō dulāri.
tana mana dhana vāri vāri kahata mr̥du bacaniyām̐..
vidruma sē aruṇa adhara bōlata mukha madhura madhura.
subhaga nāsikā mēm̐ cāru laṭakata laṭakaniyām̐..
tulasīdāsa ati ānanda dēkhakē mukhāravinda.
raghuvara chabi kē samāna raghuvara chabi baniyām̐..

== See also ==
- Hanuman Chalisa
- Shri Ramachandra Kripalu
- Ramcharitmanas
- Tulsidas
