= Todi (raga) =

Hindustani raga

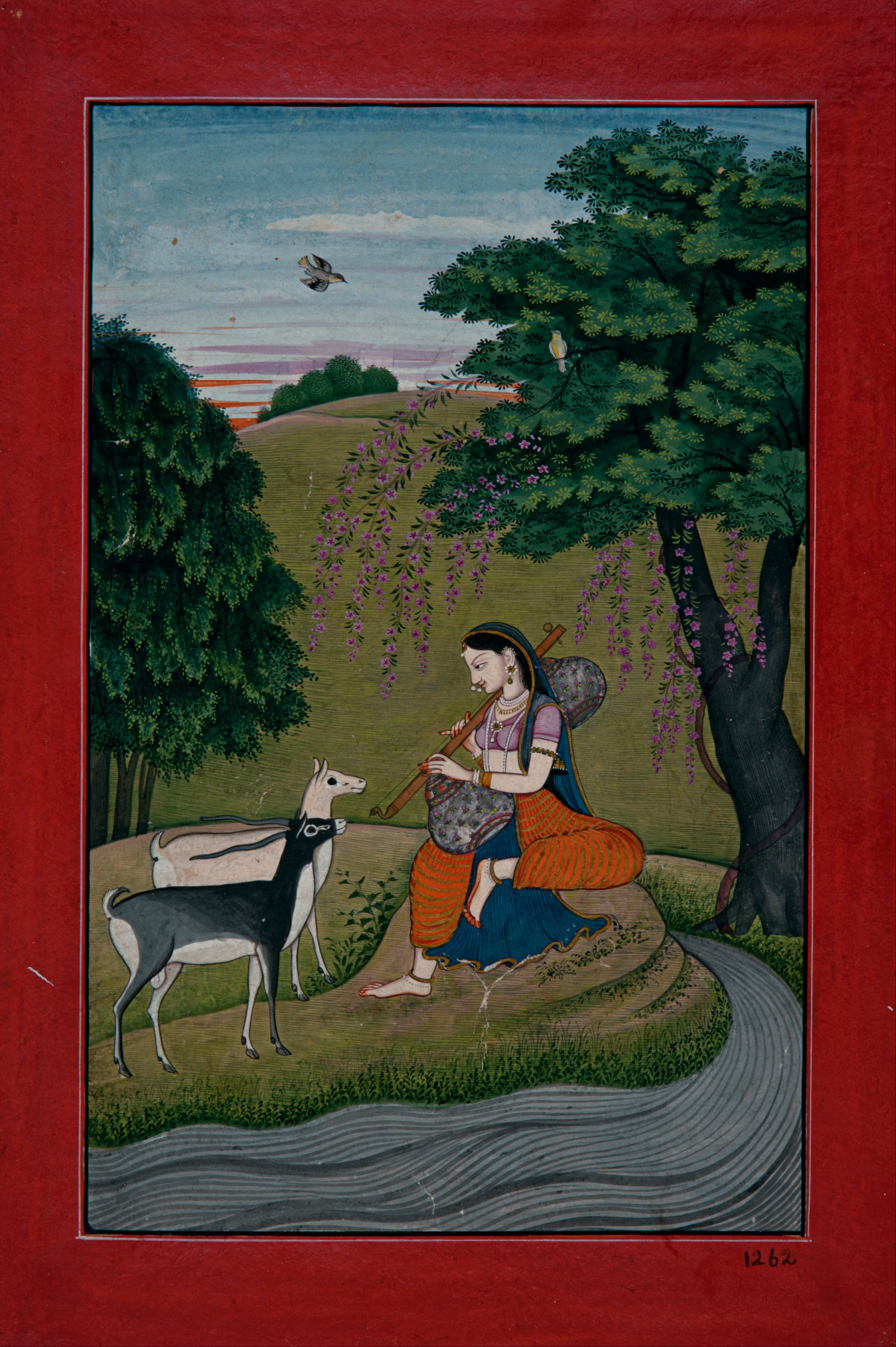
- Thaat: Todi
- Type: Sampurna
- Time of day: Late morning, 9–12
- Arohana: S Ṟ G̱ M̄ Ḏ N Ṡ; Ḏ̣ Ṇ S Ṟ G̱ M̄ Ḏ N Ṡ; S Ṟ G̱ M̄ Ḏ P,M̄ Ḏ N Ṡ; S Ṟ G̱ M̄ P,M̄ Ḏ N Ṡ
- Avarohana: Ṡ N Ḏ P M̄ G̱ Ṟ S; Ṡ N Ḏ P M̄ Ḏ M̄ G̱ Ṟ G̱ Ṟ S
- Vadi: Ḏ
- Samavadi: G̱
- Synonym: Miyan ki Todi; Shuddh Todi; Darbari Todi
- Equivalent: Shubhapantuvarali
- Similar: Gujari Todi

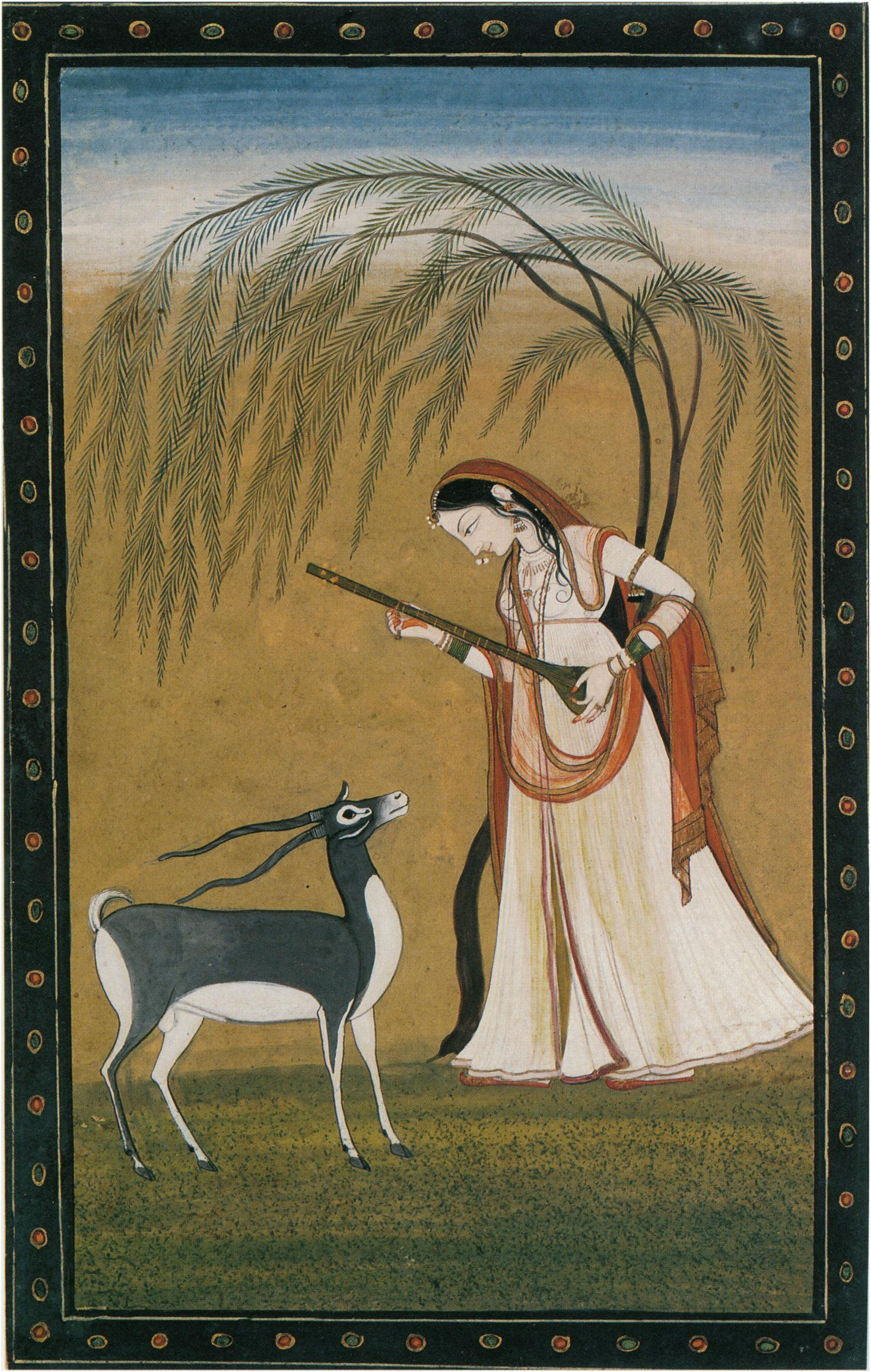
The Musical Mode: Ragini Todi. Ascribed to a Master of the Second Generation after Nainsukh, c. 1825-30. Government Museum and Art Gallery, Chandigarh

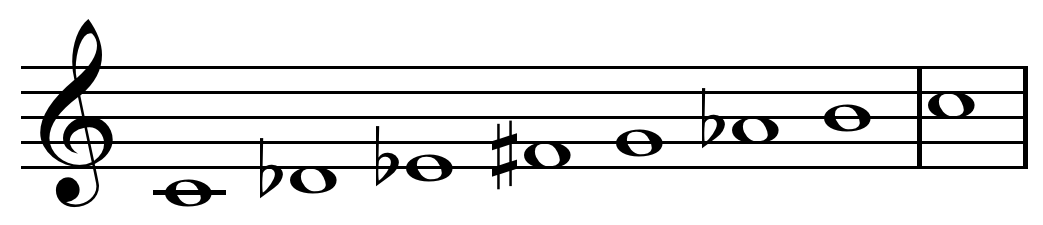
Todi.

Miyan ki Todi, often simply referred to as Todi or Darbari Todi (IAST: Toḍi), is a Hindustani classical raga which gave its name to the Todi thaat, one of the ten types of classical music according to the musicologist Bhatkhande. Ragas from the Todi raganga (class of ragas) include Todi (a.k.a. Miyan ki Todi) itself, Bilaskhani Todi, Gujari Todi (also called Gurjari Todi), Desi Todi, Hussaini Todi, Asavari Todi (more commonly known as Komal Rishabh Asavari) and Bahaduri Todi.

The equivalent raga in Carnatic music is Shubhapantuvarali. But in Todi, the pancham is omitted in the Arohana, whereas Shubhapanthuvarali uses the panchamam in both the arohana and avarohana. The Carnatic Melakarta Hanumatodi is the equivalent of Bhairavi thaat, but the Hindustani Bhairavi raga is the equivalent of Carnatic Sindhu Bhairavi. Carnatic Todi does not have any similarity with Hindustani Todi (Miyan ki Todi) raga. Though the Swarasthana orders of Carnatic Thodi are similar to Hindustani Bhairavi thaat, but when the Carnatic Todi is sung it has no similarity with Hindustani Todi, Bhairavi, or Carnatic Sindhu Bhairavi.

== Aroha & Avaroha ==
Arohana

- S Ṟ G̱ M̄ Ḏ N Ṡ
- Ḏ̣ Ṇ S Ṟ G̱ M̄ Ḏ N Ṡ
- S Ṟ G̱ M̄ Ḏ P,M̄ Ḏ N Ṡ
- S Ṟ G̱ M̄ P,M̄ Ḏ N Ṡ

Avarohana

- Ṡ N Ḏ P M̄ G̱ Ṟ S
- Ṡ N Ḏ P M̄ Ḏ M̄ G̱ Ṟ G̱ Ṟ S

== Vadi and Samavadi ==
Komal Dha and Komal Ga.
Re, ga and dha are intoned slightly low, and tivra ma is very sharp.

== Pakad or Chalan ==
The distinctive phrase is r/g-\r\S, where r may be subtly oscillated.

Pa is omitted in ascent, but present and often sustained. Kaufmann mentions that some musicians would call Todi with Pa Miyan Ki Todi, but others would see no difference between Todi and Miyan Ki Todi.

Sometimes the ascent is performed without Sa, starting from Ni.

== Organization and relationships ==
Miyan Ki Todi is similar to Gujari Todi and many movements are common, but in Gujari Todi Pa is omitted and there is more emphasis on Re and Dha.

Like Miyan Ki Malhar, Miyan Ki Todi is said to be composed by Tansen, but this seems unlikely as the Todi scale in Tansen's time was the scale of today's Bhairavi and the name Miyan Ki Todi appears first in the 19th century literature.

== Samay (time) ==
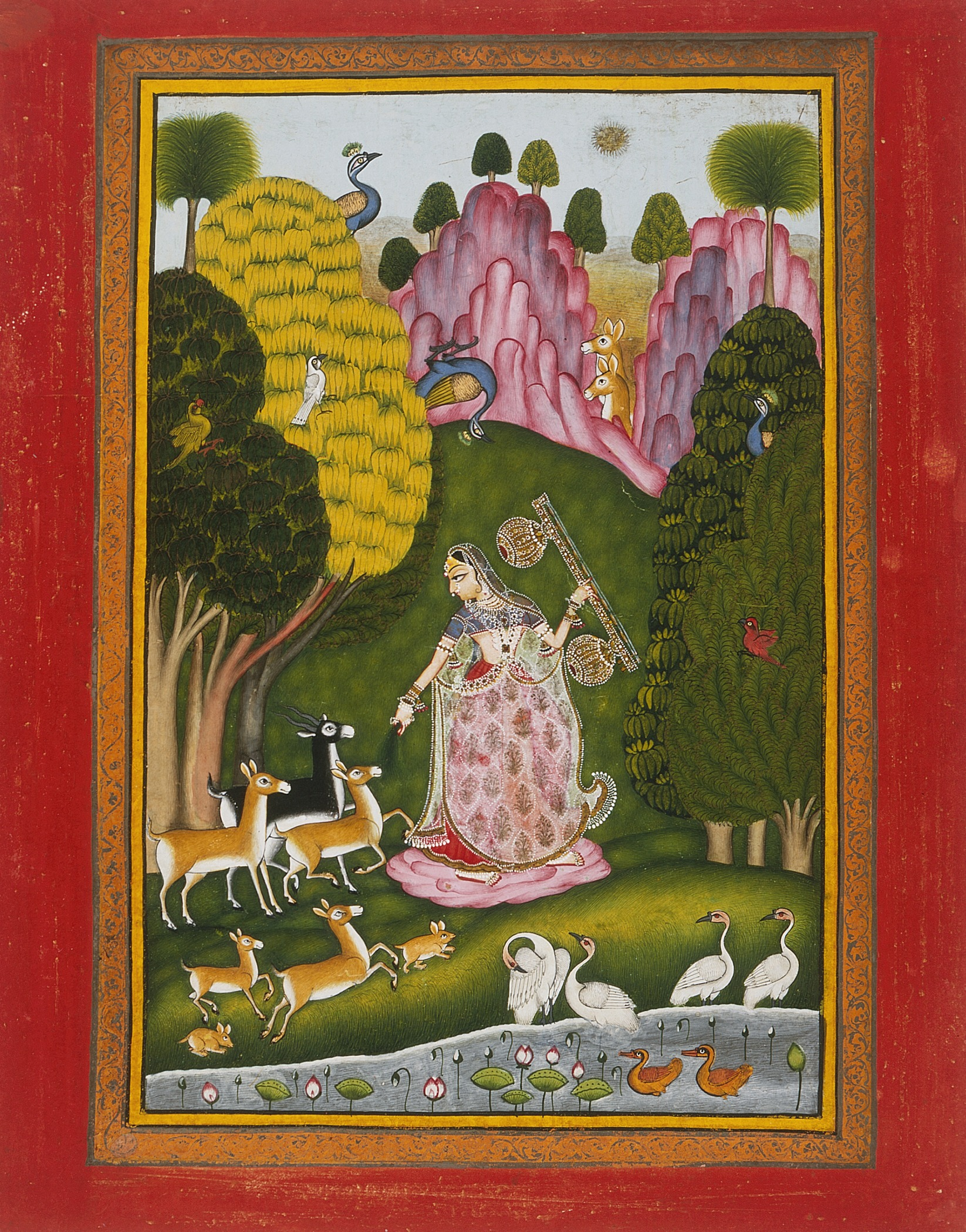
Ragamala painting of Todi, circa 1775-1800.

Todi should be performed in the morning, approximately 8-10AM. In overnight concerts, Todi is performed as early as 4AM.

== Raga ==
Todi is nearly always shown as a gentle, beautiful woman, holding a veena and standing in a lovely green forest, surrounded by deer. Kaufman cites the Sangita-Darpana (16th century)

With a fair erect body like the white lotus, and delicate like the gleaming dew drop, Todi holds the vina and provides fun and frolic to the deer deep in the forest. Her body is anointed with saffron and camphor.

Rasa in Indian classical music is understood as mood of the raga. Miyan Ki Todi is mostly pervaded by a pensive, mournful mood which is then relieved in the drut (faster tempo) part, by a festive piece, possibly to alleviate the heavy pathos in the earlier stages of rendering, though not always. The composition is such as to afford an artist of high calibre to mould it in either the inherent pensive mood or to entirely present a festive mood.

== Film songs ==
=== Language : Hindi ===
Song	Movie	Composer	Singers
Insan Bano	Baiju Bawra (film)	Naushad	Mohammad Rafi
Eri Main To Prem Divani	Meera (1979 film)	Ravi Shankar	Vani Jairam
Duniya Na Bhaye Mohe	Basant Bahar (film)	Shankar–Jaikishan	Mohammed Rafi
Duniya Na Bhaye Mohe	Pilpili Saheb(1954 film)	Sardul Singh Kwatra	Lata Mangeshkar

=== Language : Urdu ===
Song	Movie	Composer	Singers
Jis Din Piya Dil Le Gaye	Intezar	Khawaja Khursheed Anwar	Noor Jehan

=== Language : Telugu ===
Song	Movie	Composer	Singers
Evaro vastarani, Edo chestarani	Bhoomi Kosam	Pendyala (composer)	Ghantasala (musician)
Ye geeta geesina nee Roopame	Muttaiduva(1979 film)	K. V. Mahadevan	S. P. Balasubrahmanyam
Palikedidi Bhagavatamata	Bhakta Potana(1966 film)	S. Rajeswara Rao	Ghantasala (musician)

== Literature ==
- Bor, Joep (1997), The Raga Guide, Charlottesville, Virginia: Nimbus Records
- Kaufmann, Walter (1968), The Ragas of North India, Calcutta: Oxford and IBH Publishing Company
- Paras, Ustad Parvez (2019), Todi ki rawait, Lahore: Lahore School of Economics
