= Bhupal Todi =

- Thaat: Bhairavi
- Type: Audava
- Time of day: Morning, 6–9
- Season: spring
- Arohana: S r g P d S
- Avarohana: S d P g r S
- Vadi: d
- Samavadi: g
- Similar: Bilaskhani Todi

Bhupal Todi or Bhoopal Todi is a Hindustani classical raga. This raga is quite different from Bhopali (or Bhoop). The Carnatic music equivalent of Bhupal Todi musical scale is Bhupalam.

== Theory ==
=== Arohana and Avarohana ===
The scale of Bhupal Todi uses only komal swaras. It is a symmetric scale.

- Arohana : S r g P d S
- Avarohana : S d P g r S

=== Vadi and samavadi ===
- Vadi : Dha
- Samavadi : Ga

=== Organization and relationships ===
Thaat: Bhairavi. Note: the raga Bhopal Todi is Todi-Ang raga. So it is suggested that one must assume this raga from "Thaat Todi". It may be more appropriate.

== Behavior ==
=== Samay (Time) ===
This scale is sung in the morning.

== Film songs ==
=== Tamil ===
Song	Movie	Composer	Singer
"Panniner Mozhiyaal"	Thiruvarutchelvar	K. V. Mahadevan	T. M. Soundararajan, Master Maharajan
"Sugamana Sindhanaiyil"	Taxi Driver	M. S. Viswanathan	S. P. Balasubrahmanyam, S. Janaki
"Kozhi Koovum"	Vanna Vanna Pookkal	Ilaiyaraaja	S. P. Balasubrahmanyam, S. Janaki
"Degam Pon Degam"	Anbulla Malare	Ilaiyaraaja	S. Janaki
"Bhoomiye Enga"	Puthu Paatu	Ilaiyaraaja	Mano, S. Janaki
"Senthazham Poovil"	Mullum Malarum	Ilaiyaraaja	K.J. Yesudas
"Kathiravanai Paarthu"	Pookkal Vidum Thudhu	T. Rajendar	K.J. Yesudas
"Ponmaanai"	Mythili Ennai Kaathali	T. Rajendar	S. P. Balasubrahmanyam
"Boobalam Arangerum"	Agni Theertham	Shankar–Ganesh	K.J. Yesudas
"Paarthu Sirikithu Bommai"	Thirumathi Oru Vegumathi	Shankar–Ganesh	Vani Jairam
"Vaigai Neerada"	Chinnanchiru Kiliye	G. K. Venkatesh	Malaysia Vasudevan, S. Janaki
"Kadhal Kavithai Paada"	Ganam Courtar Avargale	Devendran	S. P. Balasubrahmanyam, K.S. Chitra
"Paadum Paravaigal Sangeetham"	Shenbagathottam	Sirpy	S. Janaki
