= Malkauns =

Indian classical raga

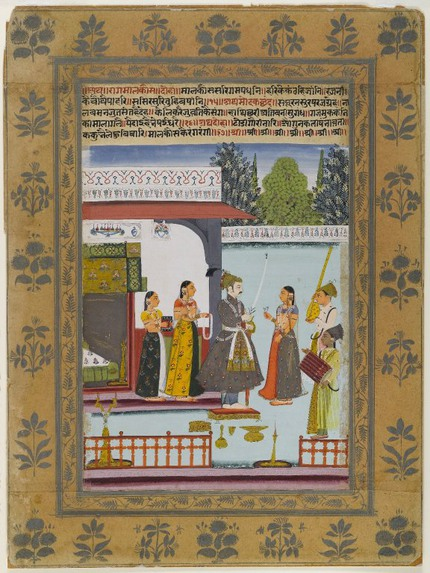
- Thaat: Bhairavi (or Asavari)
- Type: Audava
- Time of day: Late night, 12–3
- Arohana: Ṉ̣ S G̱ M Ḏ Ṉ Ṡ
- Avarohana: S Ṉ Ḏ M G̱ M G̱ S; S Ṉ Ḏ M G̱ S
- Synonym: Malkosh; Malkaush
- Equivalent: Hindolam

Malkauns, known also as rag Malkosh, is a raga in Indian classical music. It is one of the oldest ragas of Indian classical music. The equivalent raga in Carnatic music is called Hindolam, not to be confused with the Hindustani Hindol.

According to Indian classical vocalist Pandit Jasraj, Malkauns is a raga that is "sung during small hours of the morning, just after midnight." He further adds that the raga has a soothing and intoxicating effect.

== Non-film/album songs ==
Song	Language	Album	Year	Composer	Lyricist	Singer	Audio Label
Vel Vel	Tamil	Nithya Bhajanavali Vol-1	1997	Perumbavoor H. Ramanathan	Shri Hari Bhajan Sangam	Shri Hari Bhajan Sangam	Giri Trading Agency
Karpanai Endralum	Tamil	Lord Muruga T M Sounder Revival	1999	M. S. Viswanathan	Vaali	T. M. Soundararajan	saregama
Narudu Gurudani	Telugu	Namo Venkatesaya	2019	Mahesh Mahadev	Kaiwara Sri Yogi Nareyana	S. P. Balasubhramanyam, Priyadarshini, Mahesh Mahadev, Raghuram	PM Audios
Niladri Natham	Sanskrit	Jagannath Bhakti Rath Yatra	2023	Siba Prasad Rath	Dr. Ruru Kumar	Abhilipsa Panda	Times Music Spiritual

== Etymology ==
The name Malkaush is derived from the combination of Mal and Kaushik, which means he who wears serpents like garlands – the god Shiva. However, the Malav-Kaushik mentioned in classical texts does not appear to be the same as the Malkauns performed today. The raga is believed to have been created by goddess Parvati to calm Lord Shiva, when he was outraged and refused to calm down after Tandav in rage of Sati's sacrifice.

In Jainism, it is also stated that the Raga Malkauns is used by the Tirthankaras with the Ardhamāgadhi Language when they are giving Deshna (Lectures) in the Samavasarana.

Malkaush belongs to Shaivait musical school; in fact most pentatonic ragas belong to Shaivait musical school.

His mace running with blood, garlanded with skulls of heroes, Malkaush surrounded by braves and bravest of the brave!

— Shiv ttva ratnakara, 6, 8, 67

== Arohana and avarohana ==
Malkauns belongs to the Bhairavi thaat. Its notes are Sa, komal Ga, shuddh Ma, komal Dha, and komal Ni. In Western classical notation, its notes can be denoted as: tonic, minor third, perfect fourth, minor sixth and minor seventh. In raga Malkauns, Rishabh (Re – second) and Pancham (Pa – perfect fifth) are completely omitted. Its jaati is audav-audav (five-five, that is, pentatonic).

Arohana : Ṉ̣ S G̱ M Ḏ Ṉ Ṡ

Avarohana :

- S Ṉ Ḏ M G̱ M G̱ S
- S Ṉ Ḏ M G̱ S

The 'Ga' used is actually Ga-Sadharan (the rough minor third), 316-cent above Sa. This corresponds to the note ga2, in the 22 shrutis list, with a factor of 6/5.

== Vadi and Samavadi ==
The vadi swara is Madhyam (Ma) while the samavadi swara is Shadaj (Sa).

== Pakad or chalan ==
Pakad : G̱ M Ḏ M G̱ M G̱ S

== Other characteristics ==
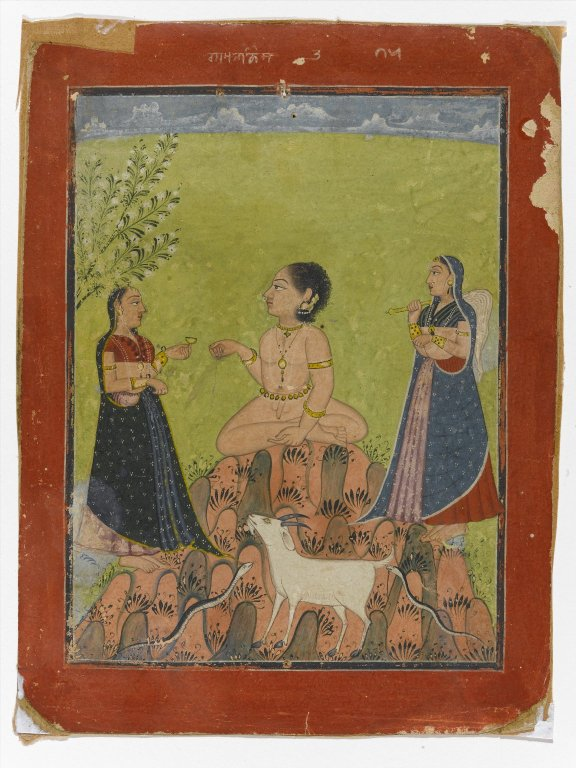
A Ragamala series painting based on Malkauns Raga, c. 1735

Malkauns is a serious, meditative raga, and is developed mostly in the lower octave (mandra saptak) and in a slow tempo (vilambit laya). Ornaments such as meend, gamak and andolan are used rather than 'lighter' ornaments such as murki and khatka. Komal Ni is generally considered the starting note (graha swara), and the notes komal Ga and komal Dha are performed with vibrato (andolit). All five swaras can function as pausing notes.

The komal Ni in Malkauns is different from the komal Ni in Bhimpalasi.

The best time for this raga is late night. The effect of the raga is soothing and intoxicating.

In teaching this rāg to students in the early 1980s, Ali Akbar Khan confirmed that Malkaush is a midnight rāg of Bhairavi thaat, Aurav jati, with moods of devotion, peace and heroism. He remarked: "Djinni like this rāg" and "At first makes you sleepy, then gives you energy to move mountains." A lakshan geet (song that describes the characteristics of the raag) taught by Khansahib relates that Malkaush is one of the six original male ragas (thus ancient) and that its rasas (roughly "moods") are devotion and heroism [tala: Ada Chautāl]:

Che ragŏ mĕ se eka rāga / Bhakti rasa, vira rasa / Mālakosha kehārvata / Vadī swara madhyamano samavādi sarajamano arohi SgmdmS avarohi nSSndmSndmgmgs

== List of ragas in the Kauns family ==
The unique musical structure of Malkauns has given rise to many variations, creating what may be called a 'Kauns' family of related ragas.

- Chandrakauns
- Suryakauns
- Bageshri-Ang Chandrakauns
- Nandkauns
- Sampoorna Malkauns
- Pancham Malkauns
- Gunkauns
- Madhukauns
- Jogkauns
- Nirmalkauns
- Tulsikauns
- Harikauns
- Mohankauns
- Charukauns
- Rageshrikauns

== Film songs ==
'Man Tarpat Hari Darshan Ko Aaj' (film Baiju Bawra, performed by Mohammad Rafi), 'Aadha Hai Chandrama Raat Aadhi' (film Navrang, performed by Mahendra Kapoor and Asha Bhosle), 'Chham Chham Ghunghroo Bole' (film Kaajal, performed by Asha Bhosle), 'Ankhiyan Sang Ankhiyaan Laagi Aaj' (film Bada Aadmi), 'Balma Maane Na' (film Opera House) and 'Rang raliyaan karat sautan sang' (film Birbal My Brother), 'Ek Ladki Thi' (film Love You Hamesha, performed by Kavita Krishnamurti) are a few Hindi film compositions based on Malkauns. 'Rajasekhara' in the film 'Anarkali' in Tamil and Telugu is a composition based on this in South India. "Ohm Namashivaya" and "Margazhi Poove" songs in Tamil by Ilaiyaraaja and AR Rahman from Salangai Oli and May Madham respectively,""Neenu Neene" song from the movie Gadibidi Ganda, "Ra Ra" song in the movie Apthamitra in Kannada are also the best examples.

== Tamil film songs ==
Note that the following songs are composed in Hindolam, the equivalent of raga Malkauns in Carnatic music.

Song	Movie	Year	Composer	Singer
Azhaikathey	Manaalane Mangaiyin Baakkiyam	1957	P. Adinarayana Rao	P. Susheela
Kangalum Kavi Paadudhe	Adutha Veettu Penn	1960	P. Adinarayana Rao	Sirkazhi Govindarajan, Thiruchi Loganathan
Ennai Vittu Odipoga Mudiyumaa	Kumudham	1961	K. V. Mahadevan	Sirkazhi Govindarajan, P. Susheela
Maamaa Maamaa Maamaa	Kumudham	1961	K. V. Mahadevan	T. M. Soundararajan, K. Jamuna Rani
Iravukku Aayiram	Kulamagal Radhai	1963	K. V. Mahadevan	P. Susheela
Pachchai Maa Malaipol Meni	Thirumal Perumai	1968	K. V. Mahadevan	T. M. Soundararajan
Or Aayiram Parvaiyile	Vallavanukku Vallavan	1965	Vedha (Credits only)	T. M. Soundararajan
Nilavukku Emmel Ennadi Kobam	Policekaran Magal	1962	Viswanathan–Ramamoorthy	P. B. Sreenivas
Malaro Nilavo	Raga Bandhangal		Kunnakudi Vaidyanathan	P. Jayachandran
Ramanukku Mannan Mudi	Pathu Matha Pantham		Shankar–Ganesh	P. Bhanumathi
Maname Muruganin	Motor Sundaram Pillai	1966	M. S. Viswanathan	Soolamangalam Jayalakshmi
Iyarkai Ennum	Shanti Nilayam	1969	M. S. Viswanathan	S. P. Balasubrahmanyam, P. Susheela
Unnidathil Ennai Koduthen	Avalukendru Or Manam	1971	M. S. Viswanathan	S. Janaki
Om Namashivaya	Salangai Oli	1983	Ilaiyaraaja	S. Janaki
Vilakku Vaipom	Athma	1993	Ilaiyaraaja	S. Janaki
Sri Devi En Vazhvil	Ilamai Kolam	1980	Ilaiyaraaja	K. J. Yesudas
Darisanam Kidaikatha	Alaigal Oivathillai	1981	Ilaiyaraaja	Ilaiyaraaja, S. Janaki
Naan Thedum Sevanthi	Dharma Pathini	1986	Ilaiyaraaja	Ilaiyaraaja, S. Janaki
Yentha Jenmam	Ezhumalayan Magimai		Ilaiyaraaja	Ilaiyaraaja, S. Janaki
Ragavane Ramana	Ilamai Kaalangal	1983	Ilaiyaraaja	P. Susheela, K. S. Chithra (Debut in Tamil)
Unnal Mudiyum Thambi	Unnal Mudiyum Thambi	1988	Ilaiyaraaja	S. P. Balasubrahmanyam
Kanna Unai Thedugiren	Unakkaagave Vaazhgiren	1986	Ilaiyaraaja	S. P. Balasubrahmanyam, S. Janaki
Thendral Thaan	Keladi Kanmani	1990	Ilaiyaraaja	K. J. Yesudas, K. S. Chithra
Hey Raja	Jallikattu	1987	Ilaiyaraaja	S. P. Balasubrahmanyam, Mano
Ooradungum Saamathile	Pudhupatti Ponnuthaayi		Ilaiyaraaja	Uma Ramanan, Swarnalatha
En Veettu Jannal	Raman Abdullah	1997	Ilaiyaraaja	Arunmozhi, Bhavatharini
Oh Janani	Pudhiya Raagam	1991	Ilaiyaraaja	Mano
Nilave Nee Vara Vendum	Ennarukil Nee Irunthal	1991	Ilaiyaraaja	Ilaiyaraaja
Vazhatha Pennin Manam	Thanga Thamaraigal	1991	Ilaiyaraaja	K. S. Chithra
Panja Swarangal	Puthiya Sangamam		Gangai Amaran	P. Susheela
Marghazhi Poove	May Maadham	1994	A. R. Rahman	Shobha Shankar
Yakkai Thiri (Moves more towards Shuddha Dhanyasi through Graha Bedham)	Aaytha Ezhuthu	2004	A. R. Rahman	A.R.Rahman, Pop Shalini, Tanvi Shah, Sunitha Sarathy
Innisai Alapadaiye	Varalaru	2006	A. R. Rahman	Naresh Iyer, Mahathi
Irumbile	Enthiran	2010	A. R. Rahman	A. R. Rahman, Kash n' Krissy
Magudi Magudi (Moves more towards Shuddha Dhanyasi and Jog, through Graha Bedham)	Kadal	2013	A. R. Rahman	Aryan Dinesh, Chinmayee, Tanvi Shah
Village Rocker (Theme) (Moves more towards Shuddha Dhanyasi through Graha Bhedam)	Peddi	2026	A. R. Rahman	A R Rahman, Nitesh Aher
Kumudam Pol	Moovendhar	1998	Sirpy	Hariharan
Katradikkum Neram	Vivasaayi Magan	1997	Sirpy	Mano, K. S. Chithra
Thevaram Paadatha	Partha Parvayil		M. M. A. Iniyavan	Mano, K. S. Chithra
Sirumalli Poove	Jallikattu Kaalai	1994	Deva	Mano, K. S. Chithra
Un Marbile Vizhi Moodi	Ninaithen Vandhai	1998	Deva	K. S. Chithra
Paadavandha Poonguyile	Oyilattam		Deva	S. P. Balasubrahmanyam
Va Va Endhan	Cheran Pandiyan	1991	Soundaryan	S. P. Balasubrahmanyam
Aathi Vadayile	Sindhu Nathi Poo	1994	Soundaryan	K. J. Yesudas, Asha Latha
Sangeetha Vanil	Chinna Poove Mella Pesu	1987	S. A. Rajkumar	S. P. Balasubrahmanyam, Vani Jairam
Ithazhodu Ithal Serum	Mannukkul Vairam	1986	Devendran	S. P. Balasubrahmanyam, S. Janaki
Thendraliley Mithanthu	Puthiya Thendral		Devendran	S. P. Balasubrahmanyam, K. S. Chithra
Siragulla Nilave Vaa	Inidhu Inidhu Kadhal Inidhu	2003	Devi Sri Prasad	S. P. Balasubrahmanyam, K. S. Chithra
Chinna Chinna Megam	Devaraagam	1996	M. M. Keeravani	S. P. Balasubrahmanyam, Sujatha Mohan
Santhanam Theychachi	Manikkam	1996	Karthik Raja	Bhavatharini
Chandira Mandalathai	Nilaave Vaa	1998	Vidyasagar	Vijay, Harini, S. P. Charan
Kavidhai Iravu	Sullan	2004	Vidyasagar	Karthik, K. S. Chithra
Aazhakkadalu	Thendral	2004	Vidyasagar	Madhu Balakrishnan
Sollathan Ninaikiren	Kadhal Sugamanathu	2001	Shiva Sankar	S. P. Balasubrahmanyam (sad version), K. S. Chithra
Uyirile	Vettaiyaadu Vilaiyaadu	2006	Harris Jayaraj	Mahalakshmi Iyer, Srinivas
Vatta Vatta	Thennavan	2003	Yuvan Shankar Raja	Unni Menon, Padmalatha
Kalavani	Kodiveeran	2017	N. R. Raghunanthan	V. V. Prasanna, Soundarya
Othaiyadi Pathayila	Kanaa	2018	Dhibu Ninan Thomas	Anirudh Ravichander
Kadai Kannaaley	Bhoomi	2021	D. Imman	Shreya Ghoshal, Varun Parandhaman

== Compositions of Hindustani classical music ==
S.No	Bandish type	Bandish initial bol	Composer/author	Taal
1	Dhrupad	Aadi Brahma Aadi Naad आदि ब्रह्म आदि नाद	Acharya Pt Gokulotsavji Maharaj	ChouTaal

== Important recordings ==
- Amir Khan, Ragas Hansadhwani and Malkauns, His Master's Voice LP (long-playing record), EMI-EASD1357
- Mekaal Hasan Band's Maalkauns from the album Andholan is also based on this.
- Ustad Mubarak Ali Khan presented it in a popular bandish "Aaj more Ghar aaye na Balma"

== Literature ==
- Gosvami, O. (1957), The Story of Indian Music, Bombay: Asia Publishing House
