= Komal Rishabh Asavari =

- Thaat: Bhairavi
- Time of day: Late morning, 9–12
- Arohana: S Ṟ M P Ḏ Ṡ
- Avarohana: Ṡ Ṉ Ḏ P M G̱ Ṟ S
- Vadi: Ḏ
- Samavadi: G̱
- Synonym: Komal Asavari
- Similar: Bhairavi; Bilaskhani Todi; Jaunpuri

Komal Rishabh Asavari (IAST: Komal Riṣabh Āsāvari), often simply called Asavari, is a raga in Hindustani classical music. As its name suggests, it differs from the raga Shuddh Rishabh Asavari by using a komal ("flat") re (Ṟ) while Asavari uses a shuddha (natural) re (R). It is believed that Komal Rishabh Asavari was the original form of Asavari.

== Theory ==
Arohana: S Ṟ M P Ḏ Ṡ (Note: Alternate notations: Carnatic: S R₁ M₁ P D₁ Ṡ; Western: C D♭ F G A♭ C)

Avarohana: Ṡ Ṉ Ḏ P M G̱ Ṟ S (Note: Alternate notations: Carnatic: Ṡ N₂ D₁ P M₁ G₂ R₁ S; Western: C B♭ A♭ G F E♭ D♭ C)

Vadi: Ḏ

Samavadi: G̱

== Sources ==
- Bor, Joep; Rao, Suvarnalata (1999). The Raga Guide: A Survey of 74 Hindustani Ragas. Nimbus Records with Rotterdam Conservatory of Music. p. 24. ISBN 9780954397609.
- Komal Riṣhabh Āsāvari Rāga (Hin), The Oxford Encyclopaedia of the Music of India. Oxford University Press. ISBN 9780195650983.
