= Asavari =

Character in the Mahabharata

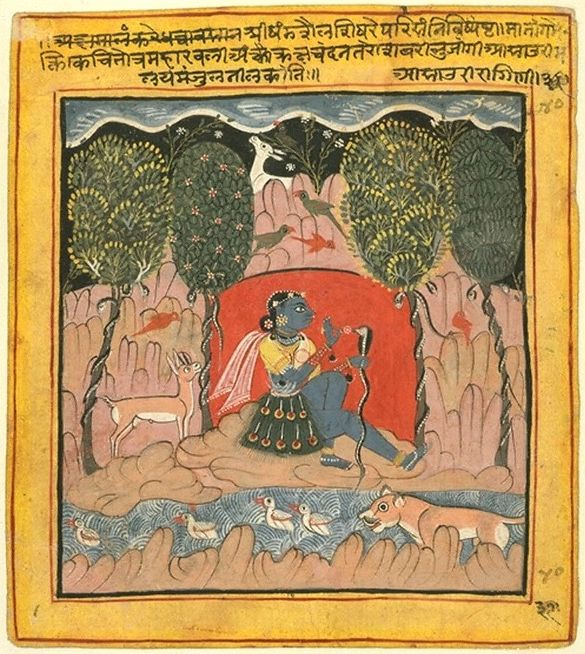
- Thaat: Asavari
- Type: Audava-Sampurna
- Time of day: Second prahara
- Arohana: S R M P Ḏ Ṡ
- Avarohana: Ṡ Ṉ Ḏ P M P Ḏ M P G̱ R S
- Pakad: M P Ḏ M P G̱ R S
- Vadi: Ḏ
- Samavadi: G̱
- Equivalent: Natabhairavi; Aeolian mode
- Similar: Bhairavi; Bilaskhani Todi; Komal Rishabh Asavari; Jaunpuri

Asavari (IAST: Āsāvari) is a raga in Hindustani classical music. It is named for a minor character from the Stri Parva in Mahabharata, the love life of Karna but due to her father's arrogance, the marriage did not take place. She belongs to the Asavari thaat kingdom.

In pre-Bhatkhande days Asavari used the Komal Rishab instead of Shuddh Rishab. When Bhatkhandeji created the that process, he changed that Asavari's Komal Rishab to Shuddha Rishab but the name remained the same. From that time the old or real 'Asavari' has been called the Komal Rishabh Asavari, and the new Shuddha Rishabh Asavari is simply called 'Asavari'.

Raga Asavari and Komal Rishabh Asavari also appears in the Sikh tradition from northern India and is part of the Sikh holy scripture called Sri Guru Granth Sahib. Sikh Gurus Sri Guru Ramdas Ji and Sri Guru Arjun Dev Ji used these ragas. The Raga Komal Rishabh Asavari appears as 'Raga Asavari Sudhang' in Sri Guru Granth Sahib Ji.

== Structure ==
Thaat: Asavari

Jati: Audava-Sampoorna

Arohana: S R M P Ḏ Ṡ (Note: Alternate notations: Carnatic: S R₂ M₁ P D₁ Ṡ; Western: C D F G A♭ C)

Avarohana: Ṡ Ṉ Ḏ P M P Ḏ M P G̱ R S (Note: Alternate notations: Carnatic: Ṡ N₂ D₁ P M₁ P D₁ M₁ P G₂ R₂ S; Western: C B♭ A♭ G F G A♭ F G E♭ D C)

Vadi: Ḏ

Samavadi: G̱

Pakad: M P Ḏ M P G̱ R S

Time: Second period of the day (9am-12pm)

Mood: Renunciation and sacrifice

== Organization and relationships ==
The ragas closest to Asavari are Komal Rishabh Asavari and Jaunpuri and it is part of the Kanada Raga group

== Film songs ==
Note that the following songs are composed in Natabhairavi, the equivalent of raga Asavari in Carnatic music.

=== Language:Tamil ===
Song	Movie	Composer	Singer
Unai Allaal Oru	Raja Mukthi	C. R. Subbaraman	M. K. Thyagaraja Bhagavathar
Vinnodum Mugilodum	Pudhaiyal	Viswanathan–Ramamoorthy	C. S. Jayaraman, P. Susheela
Manithan Embavan	Sumaithaangi	Viswanathan–Ramamoorthy	P. B. Sreenivas
Chinna Chinna Kannanukku	Vaazhkai Padagu	Viswanathan–Ramamoorthy	P. B. Sreenivas
Anubhavam Pudhumai	Kadhalikka Neramillai	Viswanathan–Ramamoorthy	P. B. Sreenivas, P. Susheela
Unaku Matum Unaku Matum	Manapanthal	Viswanathan–Ramamoorthy	P. Susheela
Ninaikka Therindha	Anandha Jodhi	Viswanathan–Ramamoorthy	P. Susheela
Ammamma Aadai	Vennira Aadai	Viswanathan–Ramamoorthy	P. Susheela
Thendral Varum	Palum Pazhamum	Viswanathan–Ramamoorthy	P. Susheela
Paalum Pazhamum	Palum Pazhamum	Viswanathan–Ramamoorthy	T. M. Soundararajan
Engalukum Kaalam Varum	Pasamalar	Viswanathan–Ramamoorthy	T. M. Soundararajan, P. Susheela
Varathiruparoo (Kuththu Vilakkeria)	Pachhai Vilakku	Viswanathan–Ramamoorthy	T. M. Soundararajan, P. Susheela
Aadavaralam	Karuppu Panam	Viswanathan–Ramamoorthy	L. R. Eswari
Poojaiku Vandha Malare	Paadha Kaanikkai	Viswanathan–Ramamoorthy	P. B. Sreenivas, S. Janaki
Podhigai Malai Uchiyiley	Thiruvilaiyadal	K. V. Mahadevan	P. B. Sreenivas, S. Janaki
Ondru Serndha Anbu	Makkalai Petra Magarasi	K. V. Mahadevan	P. B. Sreenivas, Sarojini
Oru Kodiyil Iru Malargal	Kaanchi Thalaivan	K. V. Mahadevan	T. M. Soundararajan, P. Susheela
Mayakkamenna	Vasantha Maligai	K. V. Mahadevan	T. M. Soundararajan, P. Susheela
Naan Paarthadhile	Anbe Vaa	M. S. Viswanathan	T. M. Soundararajan, P. Susheela
Oruvar Meethu	Ninaithadhai Mudippavan	M. S. Viswanathan	T. M. Soundararajan, P. Susheela
Budhan Yesu Gandhi	Chandhrodhayam	M. S. Viswanathan	T. M. Soundararajan
Kadavul Thantha	Iru Malargal	M. S. Viswanathan	P. Susheela, L. R. Eswari
Kaadhalin Pon Veedhiyil	Pookkari	M. S. Viswanathan	T. M. Soundararajan, S. Janaki
Anbumalargale	Naalai Namadhe	M. S. Viswanathan	T. M. Soundararajan, S. P. Balasubrahmanyam
Kaatrukenna Velli	Avargal	M. S. Viswanathan	S. Janaki
Kannan Manam Enna	Vasantha Raagam	M. S. Viswanathan	S. Janaki
Unnidam Mayangugiren	Then Sindhudhe Vaanam	V. Kumar	K. J. Yesudas
Yen Iniya Pon Nilavae	Moodu Pani	Ilaiyaraaja	K. J. Yesudas
Aarariroo	Thaaiku Oru Thaalaattu	Ilaiyaraaja	K. J. Yesudas
Neramithu Neramithu	Rishi Moolam	Ilaiyaraaja	T. M. Soundararajan, P. Susheela
Senthoora Poove	16 Vayathinile	Ilaiyaraaja	S. Janaki
Putham Pudhu Kaalai	Alaigal Oivathillai	Ilaiyaraaja	S. Janaki
Kannan Vanthu	Rettai Vaal Kuruvi	Ilaiyaraaja	S. Janaki
Ooru Sanam Thoongiruchu	Mella Thirandhathu Kadhavu	Ilaiyaraaja	S. Janaki
Ilampani Thuli Vizhum Neram	Aaradhanai (1981 Movie)	Ilaiyaraaja	Manjula Gururaj
Kodai Kaala Kaatre	Panneer Pushpangal	Ilaiyaraaja	Malaysia Vasudevan
Kadavul Ullame	Anbulla Rajinikanth	Ilaiyaraaja	Latha Rajinikanth & Chorus
Pesa koodathu	Adutha Varisu	Ilaiyaraaja	S. P. Balasubrahmanyam, P. Susheela
Rasathi Unnai	Vaidehi Kathirunthal	Ilaiyaraaja	P. Jayachandran
En Jeevan Paduthu	Neethana Andha Kuyil	Ilaiyaraaja	K. J. Yesudas (ver 1)S. Janaki (ver 2)
Pillai Nila	Neengal Kettavai	Ilaiyaraaja	S. Janaki, K. J. Yesudas (Pathos)
Panivizhum Iravu	Mouna Ragam	Ilaiyaraaja	S. P. Balasubrahmanyam, S. Janaki
Sokkanukku Vaacha	Kaaval Geetham	Ilaiyaraaja	S. P. Balasubrahmanyam, S. Janaki
Sangeetha Megam	Udaya Geetham	Ilaiyaraaja	S. P. Balasubrahmanyam
Antha Nilava Thaan	Muthal Mariyathai	Ilaiyaraaja	Ilaiyaraaja, K. S. Chithra
O Butterfly	Meera	Ilaiyaraaja	S. P. Balasubrahmanyam, Asha Bhosle
Andhi Mazhai Megam	Nayakan	Ilaiyaraaja	T. L. Maharajan, P. Susheela
Sorgathin Vasapadi	Unnai Solli Kutramillai	Ilaiyaraaja	K. J. Yesudas, K. S. Chithra
Oru Kiliyin	Poovizhi Vasalile	Ilaiyaraaja	K. J. Yesudas, K. S. Chithra
Maniyae Manikuyilae	Nadodi Thendral	Ilaiyaraaja	Mano, S. Janaki
Kadhorum Lolakku (Asaveri Ragam)	Chinna Mapillai	Ilaiyaraaja	Mano, S. Janaki
Malaikovil Vasaliley (Asaveri Ragam)	Veera	Ilaiyaraaja	Mano, Swarnalatha
Sollividu Velli Nilave	Amaidhi Padai	Ilaiyaraaja	Mano, Swarnalatha
Vetri Vetri (Asaveri Ragam)	Kattumarakaran	Ilaiyaraaja	S. P. Balasubrahmanyam, K. S. Chithra
Irandum Ondrodu	Panakkaran	Ilaiyaraaja	S. P. Balasubrahmanyam, K. S. Chithra
Aatthu Mettuley	Gramathu Athiyayam	Ilaiyaraaja	Malaysia Vasudevan, S. Janaki
Aasaiya Kathula	Johnny	Ilaiyaraaja	S. P. Sailaja
En Vaanilae	Johnny	Ilaiyaraaja	Jency
Kaalai Nera Raagamey	Raasave Unnai Nambi	Ilaiyaraaja	K. S. Chithra
Vaan Megam Poo Poovaai	Punnagai Mannan	Ilaiyaraaja	K. S. Chithra
Thenmadurai Vaigai Nadhi	Dharmathin Thalaivan	Ilaiyaraaja	S. P. Balasubrahmanyam, Malaysia Vasudevan, P. Susheela
Thendral Kaatre	Kumbakarai Thangaiah	Ilaiyaraaja	Mano, S. Janaki
Muthirai Eppodhu	Uzhaippali	Ilaiyaraaja	S. P. Balasubrahmanyam, Kavita Krishnamurti
Suttum Sudar Vizhi	Siraichalai	Ilaiyaraaja	M. G. Sreekumar, K. S. Chithra, Chorus
Malliga Mottu	Sakthivel	Ilaiyaraaja	Arunmozhi, Swarnalatha
Nee Partha	Hey Ram	Ilaiyaraaja	Hariharan, Asha Bhosle
Antha Naal	Adhu Oru Kana Kaalam	Ilaiyaraaja	Vijay Yesudas, Shreya Ghoshal
Paadatha Themmangu	Poonthotta Kaavalkaaran	Ilaiyaraaja	S. P. Balasubrahmanyam
Minnalae	May Maadham	A. R. Rahman	S. P. Balasubrahmanyam
Chandralekha	Thiruda Thiruda	A. R. Rahman	Annupamaa, Suresh Peters
Kadhal Sadugudu	Alaipayuthey	A. R. Rahman	S. P. Charan, Naveen
Porkalam Ange	Thenali	A. R. Rahman	Srinivas, Gopika Poornima
New York Nagaram	Sillunu Oru Kaadhal	A. R. Rahman	A. R. Rahman
Munbe Vaa (Has more of Jaunpuri)	Sillunu Oru Kaadhal	A. R. Rahman	Naresh Iyer, Shreya Ghoshal
Thalli Pogathey	Achcham Yenbadhu Madamaiyada	A. R. Rahman	Sid Sriram, Dinesh Kanagaratnam, Aparna Narayanan
Mersalaayitten (Has more of Mishra Bhairavi)	I	A. R. Rahman	Anirudh Ravichander, Neeti Mohan
Naan Un Alaginile	24	A. R. Rahman	Arijit Singh, Chinmayi
Vennilavin Theril	Duet	A. R. Rahman	K. J. Yesudas
Yen Ooru Madurapakkam	Vaasalile Oru Vennila	Deva	K. J. Yesudas
Enakenna Perandhava	Kizhakku Karai	Deva	S. P. Balasubrahmanyam, K. S. Chithra
Othayadi Paadhayile	Aatha Un Koyilile	Deva	S. P. Balasubrahmanyam, Jikki
Chinna Chinna	Senthoorapandi	Deva	Mano, Swarnalatha
Muthu Nagaye	Samundi	Deva	S. P. Balasubrahmanyam, S. Janaki
Pattuvana Rosavam	Kanni Paruvathile	Shankar–Ganesh	Malaysia Vasudevan, S. Janaki
Kadhal Vaibhogame	Suvarilladha Chiththirangal	Gangai Amaran	Malaysia Vasudevan, S. Janaki
Neeradi Vaa Thenrale	Mangai Oru Gangai	Laxmikant–Pyarelal	S. Janaki, Dinesh, Chorus
Valarum Valarum Nilavu	Paasamalargal	V. S. Narasimhan	S. P. Balasubrahmanyam, Sujatha Mohan
Ullam Ullam Inbathil	Kadhal Enum Nadhiyinile	Manoj–Gyan	P. Jayachandran, K. S. Chithra
Enakoru Snegidhi	Priyamaanavale	S. A. Rajkumar	Hariharan, Mahalakshmi Iyer
Marutha Azhagaro	Sundara Purushan	Sirpy	K. S. Chithra
Pudhu Uravu	Nila Pennae	Vidyasagar	K. J. Yesudas, P. Susheela
Nilave Nilave	Nilaave Vaa	Vidyasagar	Vijay, Anuradha Sriram
Anbe Sivam	Anbe Sivam	Vidyasagar	Kamal Haasan, Karthik
Vaseegara	Minnale	Harris Jayaraj	Bombay Jayashri
Vaigasi Nilavae	Unnale Unnale	Harris Jayaraj	Haricharan, Madhushree
Vaarayo Vaarayo	Aadhavan	Harris Jayaraj	P. Unnikrishnan, Chinmayi, Megha
Mun Paniyaa	Nandhaa	Yuvan Shankar Raja	S. P. Balasubrahmanyam, Malgudi Subha
Thuli Thuli Mazhaiyai	Paiyaa	Yuvan Shankar Raja	Haricharan, Tanvi Shah
Irava Pagala	Poovellam Kettuppar	Yuvan Shankar Raja	Hariharan, Sujatha Mohan
Nilave Nilave Saregama	Periyanna	Bharani	Hariharan, Sujatha Mohan
Thirudiya Idhayathai Thiruppi	Paarvai Ondre Podhume	Bharani	Harish Raghavendra, K. S. Chithra
Kadavul Thanda	Maayavi	Devi Sri Prasad	Kalpana, S. P. Charan
Akkam Pakkam	Kireedam	G. V. Prakash Kumar	Sadhana Sargam
Kaathodu Kaathanen	Jail	G. V. Prakash Kumar	Dhanush, Aditi Rao Hydari
Oru Killi Oru Killi	Leelai	Satish Chakravarthy	Shreya Ghoshal, Satish Chakravarthy
Jilendru Oru Kalavaram	Leelai	Satish Chakravarthy	Satish Chakravarthy
Nee Paartha Vizhigal	3	Anirudh Ravichander	Vijay Yesudas, Shweta Mohan
Velicha Poove	Ethir Neechal	Anirudh Ravichander	Mohit Chauhan, Shreya Ghoshal
Kanave Kanave	David	Anirudh Ravichander	Anirudh Ravichander
Kaathalae Kaathalae	'96	Govind Vasantha	Chinmayi, Kalyani Menon, Govind Vasantha

=== Hindi ===
- Hume Aur Jeene Ki by Kishore Kumar and Lata Mangeshkar
- Bheegi Bheegi Raaton Me by Adnan Sami
- Pal Pal hai bhaari [Lagaan]
- Sun Raha Hai Na Tu by Shreya Ghoshal and Ankit Tiwari from Aashiqui 2
