= Madhuvanti =

Janya raga of Carnatic music, also used in Hindustani classical music

- Thaat: Todi
- Type: Audava-sampurna
- Time of day: Late afternoon
- Arohana: ( N ) S G̱ M̄ P N Ṡ
- Avarohana: Ṡ N D P M̄ G̱ R S
- Synonym: Ambika
- Equivalent: Dharmavati
- Similar: Multani; Bhimpalasi; Patdip

Ravi Shankar performs Madhuvanti at the Shiraz Arts Festival in Iran in the 1970s

Madhuvanti is a raga used in Indian classical music. It is a Hindustani music raga, which is reported to have been borrowed into Carnatic music, and is structurally similar to Multani.

This Raga is based on Todi Thaat (Mode). It is a romantic raga based on the foundation, eternity and colors of love. Madhu literally means honey. It is a very sweet raga with a very simple philosophy of love and romance.

== Hindustani music ==
Madhuvanti's notes are N S Mg M P N S'(Mg in meend) while ascending and all the swaras, S' N D P M g R S, in the descent. (notations M - tivra, g-komal gandhar). Madhuvanti belongs to thaat Todi.

=== Time ===
Madhuvanti is played after 4 pm before 8 pm.

=== Rasa ===
Madhuvanti expresses a gentle loving sentiment. It depicts the sringaar rasa, used to express the love of an individual towards his or her beloved.

== Carnatic music ==
Madhuvanti is the janya raga of the 59th Melakarta of Carnatic Music, Dharmavati.

=== Structure and Lakshana ===
Dharmavati scale with Shadjam at C used as avarohana in Madhuvanti

Its ārohaṇa-avarohaṇa structure (ascending and descending scale) is as follows:

- ārohaṇa: S G₂ M₂ P N₃ Ṡ (Note: Alternate notations: Hindustani: S G̱ M̄ P N Ṡ; Western: C E♭ F♯ G B C)
- avarohaṇa: Ṡ N₃ D₂ P M₂ G₂ R₂ S (Note: Alternate notations: Hindustani: Ṡ N D P M̄ G̱ R S; Western: C B A G F♯ E♭ D C)

The notes used are Chathusruthi Rishabham (R2), Sadharana Gandharam (G2), Prati Madhyamam (M2), Chathusruthi Dhaivatham (D2) and Kakali Nishadham (N3). Notations of Carnatic music and Hindustani music differ a little bit (see swaras in Carnatic music for details on above notation and terms). It is an audava-sampurna raga (5 notes in ascending and all 7 notes in descending scale).

=== Compositions ===
Madhuvanti is a popular raga. This raga has been used to compose many tukadas (short compositions sung towards end of Carnatic music concert).

It has also been used in Indian movie songs and music as it lends itself to lilting melodies.

Lalgudi G. Jayaraman has composed a popular thillana in this raga.

The Popular Composition in Carnatic in Tamizh is Kandanall Mudalai Kadal Perugudadi by S. Chidambaram

== Film Songs ==
=== Language:tamil ===
Song	Movie	Composer	Singer
Kaadhal Kaadhal Endru Pesa	Uttharavindri Ulle Vaa	M. S. Viswanathan	P. Susheela, M. L. Srikanth
Ammaanai	Avan Oru Sarithiram	M. S. Viswanathan	T. M. Soundararajan, Vani Jayaram
Hello My Dear Wrong Number	Manmadha Leelai	M. S. Viswanathan	K.J. Yesudas, L. R. Eswari
Mella Pesungal Pirar	Kasethan Kadavulada	M. S. Viswanathan	Kovai Soundarajan, L. R. Eswari
Oomai Pennai Pesa Sonnal	Alaigal	M. S. Viswanathan	S. Janaki
Kaalai Maalai	Gnana Paravai	M. S. Viswanathan	K. J. Yesudas, K.S. Chitra
Nandhaa En Nila	Nandhaa En Nila	V. Dakshinamoorthy	S. P. Balasubrahmanyam
Ilam Solai Poothadhal	Unakkaagave Vaazhgiren	Illayaraja	S. P. Balasubrahmanyam
Konji Konji	Veera	Illayaraja	S. P. Balasubrahmanyam
Natarajan Kudi Konda	Salangaiyil Oru Sangeetham	Illayaraja	S. P. Balasubrahmanyam
Yennullil Yengo	Rosappu Ravikkaikari	Illayaraja	Vani Jairam
Vaazhvae Maayama	Gaayathri	Illayaraja	B. S. Sasirekha
Vaanaville Vaanaville	Ramanaa	Illayaraja	Hariharan, Sadhana Sargam, Illayaraja
Hey Aiyasamy	Varusham Padhinaaru	Illayaraja	S. P. Balasubrahmanyam, K.S. Chitra
Meendum Meendum va	Vikram	Illayaraja	S. P. Balasubrahmanyam, S. Janaki
Otagatho Kattiko	Gentleman	A. R. Rahman	S. P. Balasubrahmanyam, S. Janaki
Idhu Sugam	Vandicholai Chinraasu	A. R. Rahman	S. P. Balasubrahmanyam, Vani Jairam
Padal Naan Pada	Idhu Oru Thodarkathai	Gangai Amaran	S. P. Balasubrahmanyam
Oh Swarnamuki	Karuppu Vellai	Deva	S. P. Balasubrahmanyam, K.S. Chitra
Ulagathil Ulla	Thai Poranthachu	Deva	P. Unnikrishnan, Sujatha Mohan
Un Samayalarayil	Dhill	Vidyasagar	P. Unnikrishnan, Sujatha Mohan
Thavaminri kidaitha	Anbu	Vidyasagar	Hariharan, Sadhana Sargam
Silendra Theepori Ondru	Thithikudhe	Vidyasagar	Sujatha Mohan
Tha Thi Thom	Azhagan	M. M. Keeravaani	K.S. Chitra
Un Azhagukku	Aalavandhan	Shankar–Ehsaan–Loy	Shankar Mahadevan, Sujatha Mohan
Kanaa Kaanum Kaalangal (Raag Dharmavathi traces also)	7G Rainbow Colony	Yuvan Shankar Raja	Harish Raghavendra, Srimathumitha, Ustad Sultan Khan
Kanda Naal Mudhalai (Ragam Madhuvanti)	Kanda Naal Mudhal	Yuvan Shankar Raja	Subhiksha, Pooja
Eno Uyirmele	Punnagai Poove	Yuvan Shankar Raja	Bhavatharini
Vaada Bin Lada	Mankatha	Yuvan Shankar Raja	Krish, Suchitra
Enakena Yerkanave	Parthen Rasithen	Bharadwaj	P. Unnikrishnan, Harini
Idhu Kathala	February 14	Bharadwaj	Haricharan
Aayiram Yaanai	Vallamai Tharayo	Bharadwaj	Nithyasree Mahadevan, Chinmayi
Unnai Thinam Ethirparthen	Kadhaludan	S. A. Rajkumar	Prasanna, P. Unnikrishnan
Unnai Saranadainthen	Ammuvagiya Naan	Sabesh–Murali	Harish Raghavendra, Kalyani
Vaaney Vaaney	Viswasam	D. Imman	Hariharan, Shreya Ghoshal
Kanna Thoodhu Po Da	Putham Pudhu Kaalai	Govind Vasantha	Bombay Jayashri
Muskurahat	Gangubai Kathiawadi	Sanjay Leela Bhansali	Arijit Singh

== See also ==
- List of Film Songs based on Ragas

Raaga Madhuvanthi Pallavi Endru from Sollathan Ninaikkiren
