= Sri Tyagaraja =

Janya raga of Carnatic music

- Arohanam: S G₂ M₂ P N₃ Ṡ
- Avarohanam: Ṡ N₃ P M₂ G₂ R₂ S

Sri Tyagaraja is a rāgam in Carnatic music(musical scale of South Indian classical music) created by music composer Mahesh Mahadev who has created many ragas, Which is named after saint Tyagaraja of Tiruvaiyaru. It is the Janya raga of 59th Melakarta rāgam Dharmavati in the 72 melakarta rāgam system of Carnatic classical music. Mahesh Mahadev introduced this raga to Indian classical music by composing Carnatic kritis & viruttams.

Sri Tyagaraja raga is an asymmetrical and does not contain dhaivatham in both ascending and descending of the scale, The gamakas of this raga emotes bhakti and karuna rasa.

Mahesh Mahadev has also introduced this new rāgam to Hindustani music.

== Structure and Lakshana ==
Parent raga of Sri Tyagaraja Dharmavati scale with Shadjam at C

Sri Tyagaraja is an asymmetric rāgam that does not contain rishabham or dhaivatam in the ascending scale and does not contain dhaivatam in the descending scale. It is an audava-shadava rāgam (or owdava rāgam, meaning pentatonic ascending scale, shadava meaning hexatonic descending scale).

Its ārohaṇa-avarohaṇa structure (ascending and descending scale) is as follows.

- ārohaṇa: S G₂ M₂ P N₃ Ṡ (Note: Alternate notations: Hindustani: S G̱ M̄ P N Ṡ; Western: C E♭ F♯ G B C)
- avarohaṇa: Ṡ N₃ P M₂ G₂ R₂ S (Note: Alternate notations: Hindustani: Ṡ N P M̄ G̱ R S; Western: C B G F♯ E♭ D C)

The notes used in this scale are shadjam, sadharana gandharam, prati madhyamam, panchamam and kakali nishadham in ascending scale and chatushruti rishabham added in descending scale. It is a audava - shadava rāgam

== Compositions ==
The compositions in this rāgam

Composition	Language	Talam	Composer	Lyrics	Singer / Instrumentalist	Audio Label	Notes	Ref.
Sri Ramachandram Bhajami	Sanskrit	Adi	Mahesh Mahadev	Mahesh Mahadev	Priyadarshini	PM Audios	Kriti in praise of Lord Rama with a raga mudra in the composition	
Sri Tyagaraja Raga on Strings	Instrumental	Adi	Mahesh Mahadev	-	Jyostna Srikant	PM Audios		
Pahimam Sri Matangi	Sanskrit	Adi	Mahesh Mahadev	Mahesh Mahadev	Priyadarshini	Mugus Records		

== See also ==
- List of Film Songs based on Ragas
