= Gurjari (raga) =

Hindustani raga

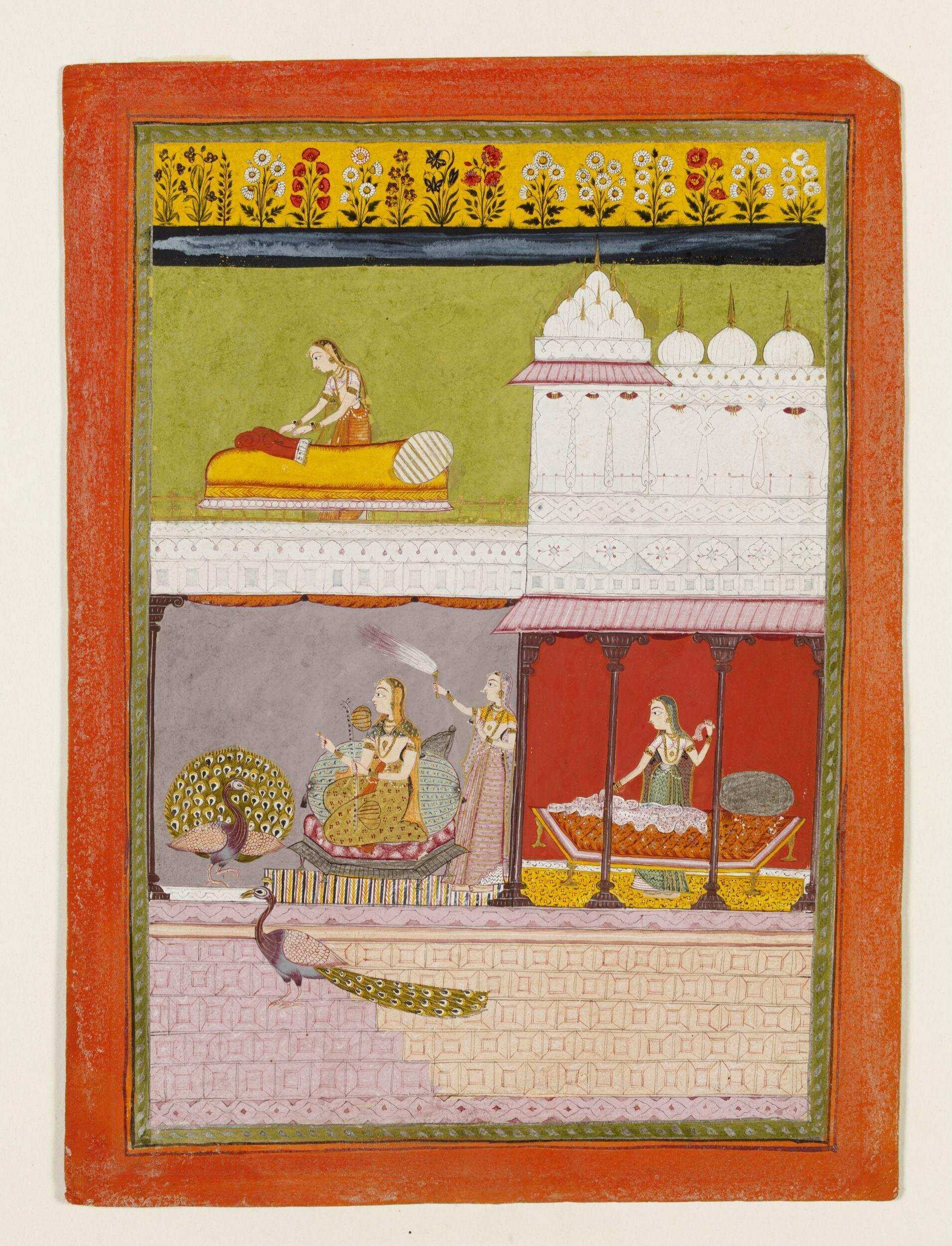
- Thaat: Todi
- Time of day: Late morning, 9–12
- Arohana: S Ṟ G̱ M̄ Ḏ N Ṡ
- Avarohana: Ṡ N Ḏ M̄ G̱ Ṟ S
- Vadi: Ḏ
- Samavadi: Ṟ
- Synonym: Gujari Todi; Gurjari Todi
- Similar: Miyan ki Todi

Gurjari is an Indian classical music raga, named after Gujarat, India. In south India, the raga is called Shekharachandrika. This raga has Tivra Ma, and Komal Re, Dha and Ga.,

The Bandish - 'Bhor Bhaye Todi Baat' sung by Ustad Bade Ghulam Ali Khan is based on this raga.
