= Hindolam =

Ragam in South Indian classical music

Hindola
- Arohanam: S G₂ M₁ D₁ N₂ Ṡ
- Avarohanam: Ṡ N₂ D₁ M₁ G₂ S

Hindōḷaṃ is a ragam in Carnatic music (musical scale of South Indian classical music). It is an audava rāgam (5 notes in arohana and avarohana) as it does not have all the seven swaras (musical notes). Hindolam is not the same as the Hindustani Hindol. The equivalent of Hindolam in Hindustani music is Malkauns (or Malkosh).

== Structure and Lakshana ==
Hindolam scale with shadjam at C

Hindōḷaṃ is a symmetric rāgam that does not contain rishabham and panchamam. It is a pentatonic scale (audava-audava rāgam in Carnatic music classification—audava means 'of 5'). Since pentatonic scales can be found in other world music such as Chinese music, shades of Mohanam and Hindōḷaṃ can sometimes be traced in Chinese and east Asian music. Its ārohaṇa-avarohaṇa structure (ascending and descending scale) is as follows (see swaras in Carnatic music for details on below notation and terms):

- ārohaṇa : S G₂ M₁ D₁ N₂ Ṡ (Note: Alternate notations: Hindustani: S G̱ M Ḏ Ṉ Ṡ; Western: C E♭ F A♭ B♭ C)
- avarohaṇa : Ṡ N₂ D₁ M₁ G₂ S (Note: Alternate notations: Hindustani: Ṡ Ṉ Ḏ M G̱ S; Western: C B♭ A♭ F E♭ C)

This rāgam uses the swaras sadharana gandharam, shuddha madhyamam, shuddha dhaivatam and kaisiki nishadam. Hindolam is not a melakarta rāgam, since it does not contain all the seven swaras.

Experts in Carnatic music hold differences of opinion on the janaka rāgams (rāgams of origin) that should be attributed to Hindolam. It is widely accepted that the 20th melakarta, Natabhairavi, is the parent rāgam of Hindolam, but some would like to associate it with the 8th melakarta, Hanumatodi. It can be derived from both, by dropping the rishabham and panchamam.

Arohanam and avarohanam for Hindolam with tambura
