= Todi (thaat) =

Thaat of Hindustani music

Todi Ragini, ca. 1625, Amber, Rajasthan

Todi (IAST: Tōḍi) is one of the ten basic thaats of Hindustani music from the Indian subcontinent. It is also the name of a raga within this thaat.

== Description ==
Todi has Komal Rishab, Gandhar, and Dhaivat, as well as Teevra Madhyam. The Todi raga represents the mood of delighted adoration with a gentle, loving sentiment and it's traditionally performed in the late morning.

== Ragas ==
Ragas in Todi Thaat:

- Miyan Ki Todi/Todi/Darbari Todi
- Gujari Todi
- Madhuvanti/Ambika
- Multani
- Bholamukhi
- Chaya Todi
- Chandra Jyoti
- Kokila Panchami
- Asha Todi
- Anjani Todi
