= Dharmavati =

59th raga in the Melakarta

- Arohanam: S R₂ G₂ M₂ P D₂ N₃ Ṡ
- Avarohanam: Ṡ N₃ D₂ P M₂ G₂ R₂ S

Dharmavati is a rāgam in Carnatic music (musical scale of South Indian classical music). It is the 59th Melakarta rāgam in the 72 melakarta rāgam system of Carnatic music. It is called Dhaamavati in Muthuswami Dikshitar school of Carnatic music. Madhuvanti is the nearest Hindustani music scale to Dharmavati. Raga Dharmavati was introduced in Hindustani music in vocal style for the first time by late Pandit Samaresh Chawdhury (disciple of Pandit Ravi Shankar).

== Structure and Lakshana ==
Dharmavati scale with Shadjam at C

It is the 5th rāgam in the 10th chakra Disi. The mnemonic name is Disi-Ma. The mnemonic phrase is sa ri gi mi pa dhi nu. Its ārohaṇa-avarohaṇa structure (ascending and descending scale) is as follows (see swaras in Carnatic music for details on below notation and terms):

- ārohaṇa: S R₂ G₂ M₂ P D₂ N₃ Ṡ (Note: Alternate notations: Hindustani: S R G̱ M̄ P D N Ṡ; Western: C D E♭ F♯ G A B C)
- avarohaṇa: Ṡ N₃ D₂ P M₂ G₂ R₂ S (Note: Alternate notations: Hindustani: Ṡ N D P M̄ G̱ R S; Western: C B A G F♯ E♭ D C)

(the notes in this scale are chathusruthi rishabham, sadharana gandharam, prati madhyamam, chathusruthi dhaivatham, kakali nishadham)

As it is a melakarta rāgam, by definition it is a sampoorna rāgam (has all seven notes in ascending and descending scale). It is the prati madhyamam equivalent of Gourimanohari, which is the 23rd melakarta.

== Janya rāgams ==
Dharmavati has a few janya rāgams (derived scales) associated with it, of which Madhuvanti, Ranjani, Sri Tyagaraja and Vijayanagari are popular in concerts. See List of janya rāgams for all rāgams associated with Dharmavati.

== See also ==
- List of Film Songs based on Ragas
