= Bilaskhani Todi =

Hindustani raga

- Thaat: Bhairavi
- Type: Audava-sampurna
- Time of day: Morning, 6–9
- Arohana: Sa re ga Pa dha Sa
- Avarohana: re ni dha Ma ga re Sa
- Vadi: dha
- Samavadi: ga
- Synonym: Vilaskhani Todi
- Similar: Bahaduri Todi

Bilaskhani Todi is a Hindustani classical raga. It is a blend of the ragas Asavari and Todi, and has a close affinity with Komal Rishabh Asavari. Though being named Bilaskhani Todi, it does not belong to the Thaat Todi, but it belongs to the Thaat Bhairavi. It is named Bilaskhani Todi because of the Meend used while singing the notes 'Ga' and 'Re', a common feature of the Raag 'Todi'.

== Theory ==
The Hindustani classical raga Bilaskhani Todi is an example of the flaws of the Bhatkhande thaat system because it is classified under the Bhairavi thaat based on the notes it uses, but it is actually a type of Todi, and permitting any Bhairavi during a performance kills the raga.

=== Arohana and avarohana ===
- Arohana: Sa re ga Pa dha Sa
- Avarohana: re ni dha Ma ga re Sa

=== Vadi and samavadi & Nais Swara ===
- Vadi: dha
- Samavadi: ga
- Nais Swara: Sa, Re(Short), Ga, Pa, Dha

=== Organization and relationships ===
Thaat: Bhairavi

=== Samay (Time) ===
Morning, between 6 a.m. to 12 p.m.

=== Seasonality ===
Certain ragas have seasonal associations.

=== Rasa ===
Devotional, Bhakti

== Historical information ==
=== Origins ===
Legend has it that this raga was created by Bilas Khan, son of Miyan Tansen, after his father's death. It is said that while trying to sing Todi, his father's favorite raga, in the wake of his father, Bilas was so grief-stricken that he mixed up his notes. That gave birth to this raga, and that Tansen's corpse moved one hand in approval of the new melody. (There is a similar legend, differing only in detail, about Tansen's Todi.)

=== Important recordings ===
- Amir Khan, Ragas Bilaskhani Todi and Abhogi, His Master's Voice/AIR LP (long-playing record), EMI-ECLP2765
- Nikhil Banerjee, Morning Ragas, Bombay 1965, LP record, Raga Records. (Audio CD released June 1996; iTunes 2000).
- Ravi Shankar, from the 1950s
- Asha Bhosle, Jhoote Naina Bole

== Film songs ==
=== Hindi ===
Song	Movie	Composer	Singers
Jhoothe Naina Bole Sanchi Bateeyan	Lekin...	Hridaynath Mangeshkar	Asha Bhosle

=== Tamil ===
Song	Movie	Composer	Singer	
"Uthaya Geetham"	Udaya Geetham	Ilaiyaraaja	S.P. Balasubrahmanyam	
"Malai Nera Kaatre"	Agal Vilakku	Ilaiyaraaja	S. Janaki	
"Thendrale Nee Pesu"	Kadavul Amaitha Medai	Ilaiyaraaja	P. B. Sreenivas	
"Padaithane Padaithane"	Nichaya Thamboolam	Viswanathan-Ramamoorthy	T. M. Soundararajan	
"Ammamma Kaatru Vanthu"	Vennira Aadai	Viswanathan-Ramamoorthy	P. Susheela	
"Ther Edhu Silai Edhu"	Paasam	Viswanathan-Ramamoorthy	P. Susheela	
"Satti Suttathada"	Aalayamani	Viswanathan-Ramamoorthy	T. M. Soundararajan	
"oorengum maappiLLai oorvalam"	Santhi	Viswanathan-Ramamoorthy	P. Susheela	
"kuyilaaga naan irunthenna"	Selva Magal	Viswanathan-Ramamoorthy	M. S. Viswanathan	P. Susheela - T. M. Soundararajan
"Ennai Marandhathen Thendrale"	Kalangarai ViLakkam	Viswanathan-Ramamoorthy	M. S. Viswanathan	P. Susheela
