= Multani (raga) =

Hindustani classical raga

- Thaat: Todi
- Time of day: Afternoon, 3–6
- Arohana: Ṇ S G̱ M̄ P N Ṡ
- Avarohana: Ṡ N Ḏ P M̄ G̱ Ṟ S
- Vadi: P
- Samavadi: S

Multani is a Hindustani classical raga. The newer raga Madhuvanti was inspired by Multani. Multani belongs to Todi Thaat. It is generally sung in the third prahar of the day, that is, around 1 PM to 4 PM.

Re, Ga, Dha komal and Ma tivra.

Re and Dha should be weak, and should be included only in Avarohi phrases.

Vadi: Pa

Samvadi: Sa

Arohana
Ṇ S G̱ M̄ P N Ṡ

Avarohana
Ṡ N Ḏ P M̄ G̱ Ṟ S

Pakad
Ṇ S M̄ G̱ M̄ P M̄ G̱ M̄ G̱ Ṟ S

In Avaroh that is in descending order, the Sangati of Madhyama and Gandhara is shown often. This is the characteristics of Rag Multani.

In Aroh, Raga start from Mandra Nishad, just like N S g or N S M g.

As there is Komal Rushabh in this Rag, it is Sandhi prakash rag.
