= Natabhairavi =

Rāgam in Carnatic music

- Arohanam: S R₂ G₂ M₁ P D₁ N₂ Ṡ
- Avarohanam: Ṡ N₂ D₁ P M₁ G₂ R₂ S
- Equivalent: Aeolian mode

Naṭabhairavi is a rāgam in Carnatic music (musical scale of South Indian classical music). It is the 20th melakarta rāgam in the 72 melakarta rāgam system. It corresponds to the Natural minor scale (alias Aeolian mode) of western music system.

Natabhairavi corresponds to the Asavari thaat of Hindustani music. In the Muthuswami Dikshitar school this melakarta is instead known as Nārīrītigowla. Natabhairavi is known to be a rāgam that incites feelings of grandeur and devotion in the listeners.

== Structure and Lakshana ==
Natabhairavi scale with shadjam at C

It is the 2nd rāgam in the 4th chakra Veda. The mnemonic name is Veda-Sri. The mnemonic phrase is sa ri gi ma pa dha ni. Its ārohaṇa-avarohaṇa structure is as follows (see swaras in Carnatic music for details on the notations used):

- ārohaṇa : S R₂ G₂ M₁ P D₁ N₂ Ṡ (Note: Alternate notations: Hindustani: S R G̱ M P Ḏ Ṉ Ṡ; Western: C D E♭ F G A♭ B♭ C)
- avarohaṇa : Ṡ N₂ D₁ P M₁ G₂ R₂ S (Note: Alternate notations: Hindustani: Ṡ Ṉ Ḏ P M G̱ R S; Western: C B♭ A♭ G F E♭ D C)

(this scale uses the notes chatushruti rishabham, sadharana gandharam, shuddha madhyamam, shuddha daivatam, kaishiki nishadam)

It is a sampoorna rāgam - rāgam having all 7 swarams. It is the shuddha madhyamam equivalent of Shanmukhapriya, which is the 56th melakarta.

== Asampurna Melakarta ==
Nārīrītigowla is the 20th Melakarta in the original list compiled by Venkatamakhin. The notes used in the scale are the same, but the scales have vakra prayoga (zig-zag usage of notes in the ascending and descending scale).

- ārohaṇa: S G₂ R₂ G₂ M₁ N₂ D₁ M₁ N₂ N₂ Ṡ (Note: Alternate notations: Hindustani: S G̱ R G̱ M Ṉ Ḏ M Ṉ Ṉ Ṡ; Western: C E♭ D E♭ F B♭ A♭ F B♭ B♭ C)
- avarohaṇa: Ṡ N₂ D₁ M₁ G₂ M₁ P M₁ G₂ R₂ S (Note: Alternate notations: Hindustani: Ṡ Ṉ Ḏ M G̱ M P M G̱ R S; Western: C B♭ A♭ F E♭ F G F E♭ D C)

== Janya rāgams ==
Natabhairavi has a number of popular janya rāgams (derived scales) such as Bhairavi, Nagagandhari, Saramati, Jaunpuri, Hindolam (sometimes Hindolam is also associated as a Janya of Hanumatodi), Darbari Kanada and Jayanthasree. New janya ragas like Kamakhyapriya. See List of janya rāgams for a full list of Natabhairavi's janya rāgams.
