= Bhairavi (thaat) =

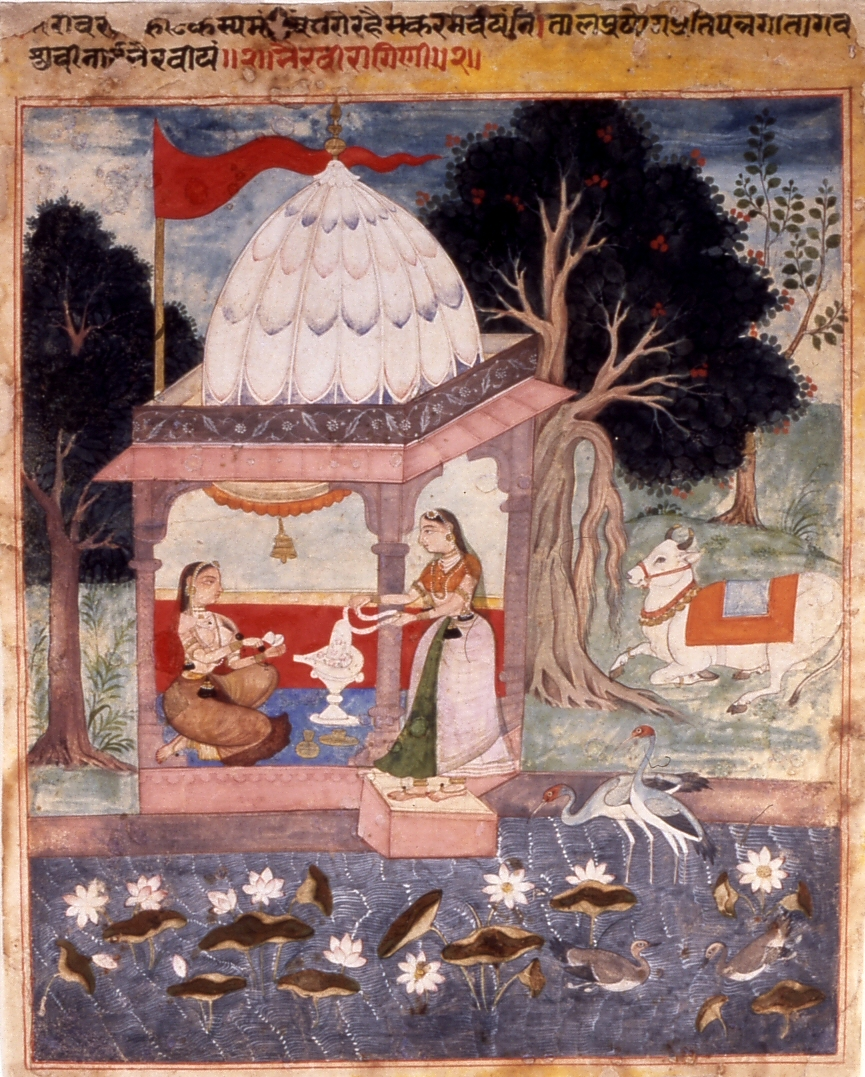
Ragini Bhairavi, between 1600 and 1625

Bhairavi is one of the ten basic thaats of Hindustani music from the Indian subcontinent. It is also the name of a raga within this thaat.

== Description ==
Bhairavi makes use of all the Komal swaras, Rishabh, Gandhar, Dhaivat, Nishad. When singing compositions in Bhairavi raga, the singers however take liberty to use all the 12 swaras. Bhairavi raga is named after the Shakti or feminine aspect of the cosmic life force, which is personified as a consort of Shiva (Bhairava). In Western Music, it is equivalent to the Phrygian mode.

== Ragas ==
Ragas in Bhairavi thaat include:

- Bhairavi
- Bilaskhani Todi
- Bhupal Todi
- Kaunsi Kanada
- Komal Rishabh Asavari
- Malkauns
