= Asavari (thaat) =

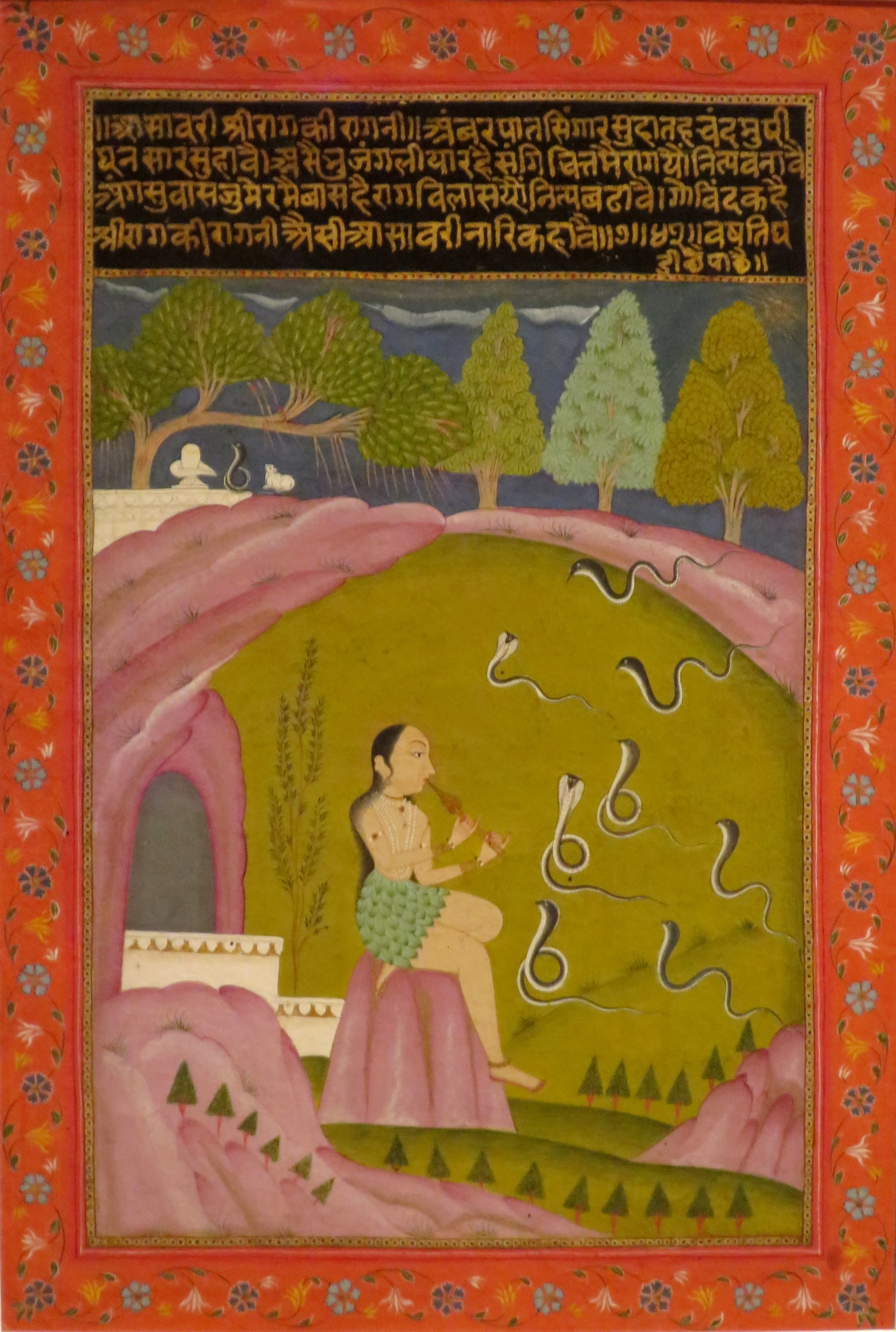
Asavari Ragini, 1750, watercolor on paper, Honolulu Museum of Art

Asavari (IAST: Āsāvari) is one of the ten basic thaats of Hindustani music from the Indian subcontinent. It is also the name of a raga within this thaat.

== Description ==
Adding a Komal Dhaivat to Kafi Thaat results in the Asavari thaat. Raga Asavari is full of tyag, the mood of renunciation and sacrifice as well as pathos. It is best suited for late morning. However important evening/night raga-like Darbari and Adana also use notes of Asavari thaat with different styles, stress points and ornamentation.

Ragas in Asavari Thaat:

1. Asavari
2. Desi
3. Darbari
4. Kaunsi Kanada
5. Adana
6. Jaunpuri
7. Devgandhar
