= Jaunpuri (raga) =

Janya raga of Carnatic music, also used in Hindustani classical music

- Thaat: Asavari
- Time of day: 2nd Prahar (9 AM to 12 PM)
- Arohana: S R m P d n S'
- Avarohana: S' n d P m g R S
- Pakad: m P n d P, d m P g, R m P
- Vadi: Dha
- Samavadi: Ga

Raga Jaunpuri is a rāga in Hindustani classical music in the Asavari thaat. Some musicians like Omkarnath Thakur consider it indistinguishable from the shuddha rishabh Asavari. Its attractive swaras also make it a popular raga in the Carnatic circles with a number of compositions in South India being tuned to Jaunpuri.

The name of the rāga may associate it with places of this name, such as Javanpur in Gujarat, close to Saurasthra region and Jaunpur in northern Uttar Pradesh.

== History ==
Jaunpuri was created by Sultan Hussain Sharqi of Jaunpur.

== Structure ==
The Pakad is "m P n d P, m P g, R m P"

It is usually performed in morning (9-12pm).

== In Carnatic music ==
=== Structure and Lakshana ===
- ārohaṇa : S R₂ M₁ P D₁ N₂ Ṡ (Note: Alternate notations: Hindustani: S R M P Ḏ Ṉ Ṡ; Western: C D F G A♭ B♭ C)
- avarohaṇa : Ṡ N₂ D₁ P M₁ G₂ R₂ S (Note: Alternate notations: Hindustani: Ṡ Ṉ Ḏ P M G̱ R S; Western: C B♭ A♭ G F E♭ D C)

(the notes used in this scale are shadjam, chathusruthi rishabham, sadharana gandharam, shuddha madhyamam, panchamam, kaishika nishadham and shuddh dhaivatam)

In the Carnatic circles, Jonpuri is considered a janya rāga of Natabhairavi, the 20th Melakarta rāga.

=== Popular compositions ===
Jaunpuri lends itself to songs that convey grandeur or awe.
