= Bhairavi (Hindustani) =

Hindustani raga

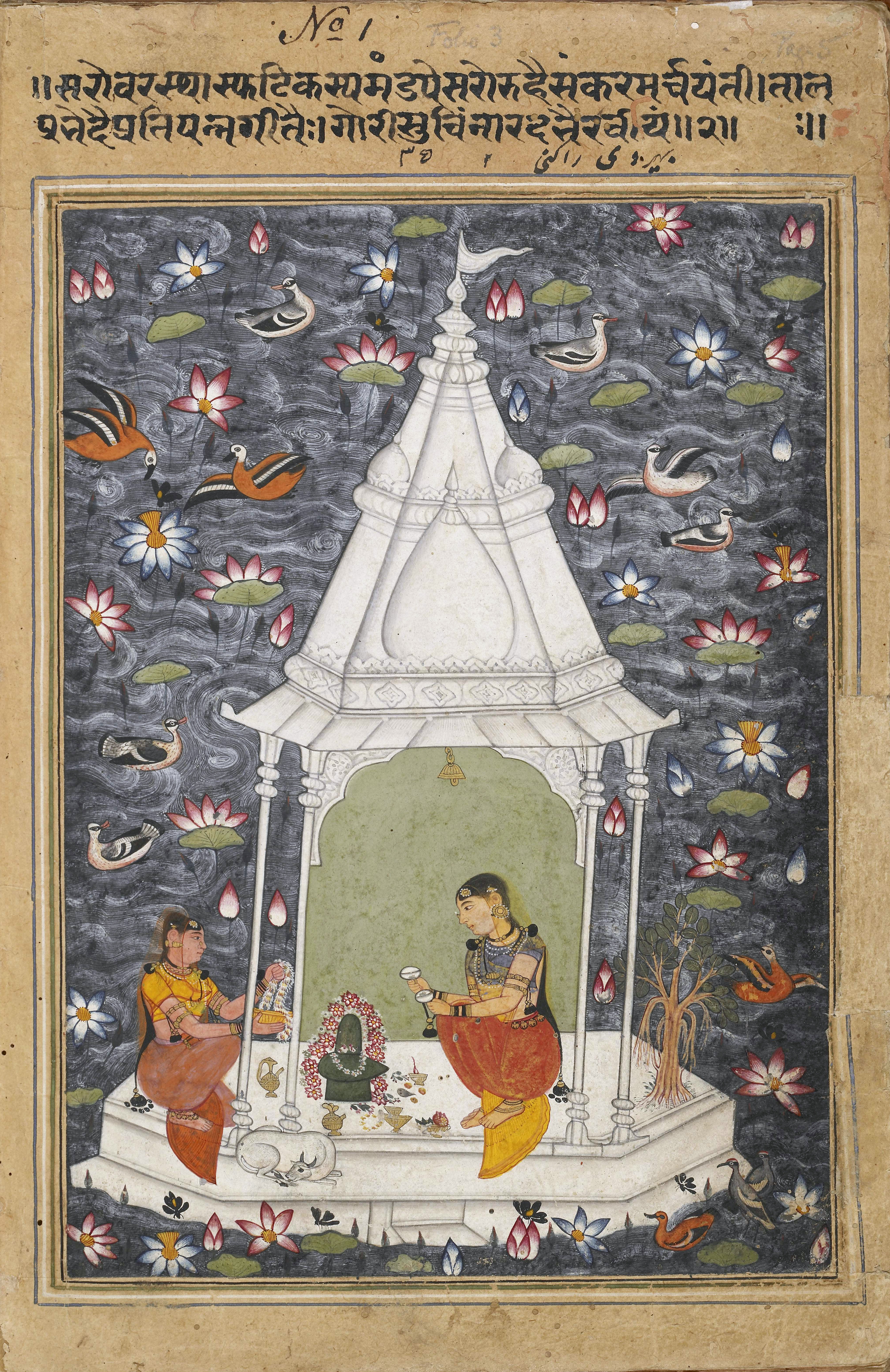
- Thaat: Bhairavi
- Type: Sampurna
- Time of day: Morning; Conclusion of a concert
- Arohana: Sa Re Ga Ma Pa Dha Ni Sa'
- Avarohana: Sa' Ni Dha Pa Ma Ga Re Sa
- Pakad: 'Ni Sa Ga Ma Dha Pa Ga Ma Ga Re Sa
- Vadi: Ma/Pa
- Samavadi: Sa
- Equivalent: Hanumatodi; Phrygian mode

Bhairavi (Hindi: भैरवी, Urdu: بَھیرَوی, Bengali: ভৈরবী) is a Hindustani Classical heptatonic (Sampurna) raga of Bhairavi thaat. In Western musical terms, raga Bhairavi employs the notes of the Phrygian mode, one of the traditional European church modes.

== Theory ==
Raga Bhairavi is often referred to as the queen of morning Ragas. It produces a rich, devotional atmosphere especially suitable for the genres of Bhajan and the light classical form of Thumri. The Rishabh and Dhaivat used here are oscillating which is strongly recommended in this Raga and it makes the Raag mood intense.

Rishabh and Pancham are occasionally skipped in Aaroh, like: S G m d P or G m d N S'. But in Avroh, Rishabh and Pancham are Deergh, like S' N d P or P m G m r r S. In Avroh, Gandhar is skipped, like: G m r S. Madhyam is an important note.

=== Arohana & Avarohana ===
- Arohana : Sa Re Ga Ma Pa Dha Ni Ṡa
- Avarohana : Ṡa Ni Dha Pa Ma Ga Re Sa

=== Vadi & Samavadi ===
- Vadi : Ma/Pa
- Samavadi : sa

== Variants ==
The rich culture of Bhairavi being the closing Raga for any formal performance has produced, also, many newly explored shades of the Raga:

- Shuddha Bhairavi (Bhairavi with no deviations from the prescribed notes and movements)
- Sindhu Bhairavi (added Shuddha Dha)
- Jangla Bhairavi
